= Luis Perlotti =

Argentine artist (1890–1969)

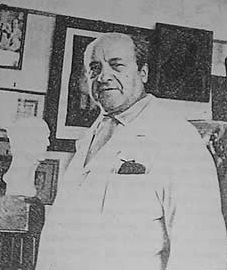
- Born: June 23, 1890; Buenos Aires
- Died: January 25, 1969 (aged 78); Punta del Este, Uruguay
- Style: Mannerism, Realism

Luis Perlotti (June 23, 1890 – January 25, 1969) was an Argentine sculptor.

== Early life and influences ==
Perlotti was born into a family of Italian immigrant workers. His father, a shoe cobbler, died in 1899, and young Luis Perlotti was compelled to find work. He was employed at the Rigolleau glass factory, and later at a cabinet maker, where he developed skills in polishing and shaping. He began his studies as a craftsman and sculptor at the Unione e Benevolenza mutual aid society, and was later accepted into the National Academy of Fine Arts, where he was trained by painters Pío Collivadino, Pablo Ripamonti, and by sculptor Lucio Correa Morales. He soon received commissions to create busts and memorials for the National Military College, and in 1914, exhibited for the first time at the National Salon.

He became acquainted with other Argentine artists, including painter Benito Quinquela Martín, poet Alfonsina Storni, and others, who would gather at the Café Tortoni. The archaeological findings of Eduardo Holmberg and Juan Bautista Ambrosetti, as well as the regionalist fiction of Ricardo Rojas, would influence Perlotti to incorporate indigenous motifs in which developing style, and a tour of the Andes in 1925 would further influence his work in subsequent years.

== Works ==
He would be commissioned to create large-scale works for both public display and for private clients, notably the Mar del Plata monument to his friend, the poet Alfonsina Storni, which would be placed in 1942 opposite the place where she had committed suicide; Perlotti engraved her 1925 poem, Pain, upon the memorial. Other notable works would include the Monument to Bartolomé Mitre, in the city of Corrientes; the monument to Los Libres del Sur, in the city of Chascomús; Return to the Fatherland, in Tunuyán, Mendoza; The Dance of the Arrow, in Paraná, Entre Ríos (which had earned a gold medal in the Ibero-American Exposition of 1929, in Seville); the monument to the Andes, Los Andes Park, in the Chacarita ward of Buenos Aires; La Piedad, in Chacarita Cemetery; memorials to Generals Juan Lavalle and Pablo Riccheri, and boxer Luis Firpo, in La Recoleta Cemetery; a monument to motherhood, in Rivadavia Square; relief in homage to Lady Liberty on the base of the Plaza Arenales flag pole; a monument to José de San Martín, located in the Supreme Court; and the Martín Fierro Award, among numerous other works.

== Museum ==
Perlotti donated his house and workshop in the Caballito ward of Buenos Aires in 1969 for its use as a museum. Vacationing in Punta del Este, Uruguay, in January 1969, the noted sculptor died in an automobile accident. The Luis Perlotti Museum became the municipal museum of sculpture of Buenos Aires, and was reopened in 2008 following a four-year refurbishment and expansion.

== Selected works ==
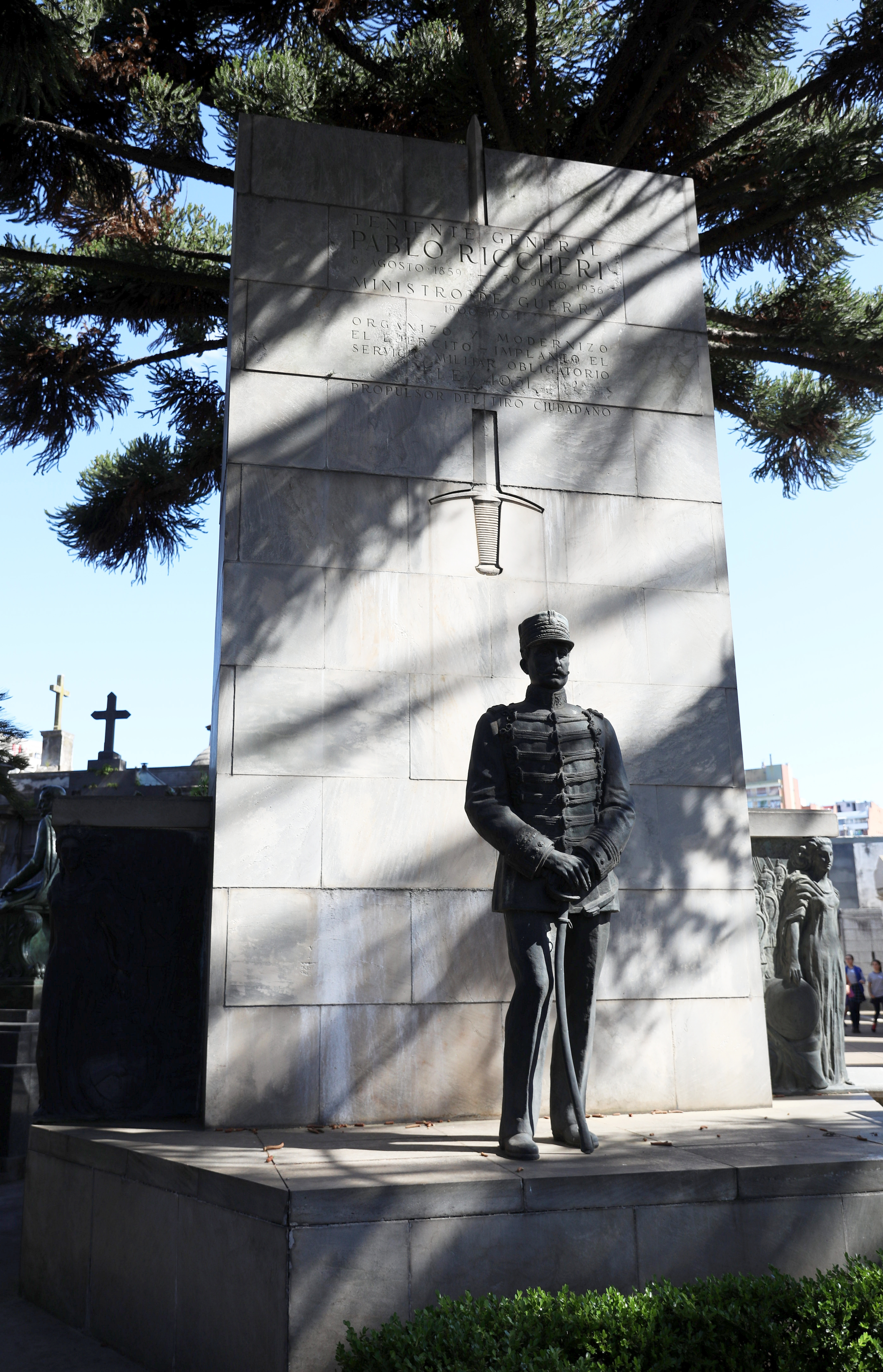
Tomb of Pablo Riccheri (Recoleta Cemetery, 1936)

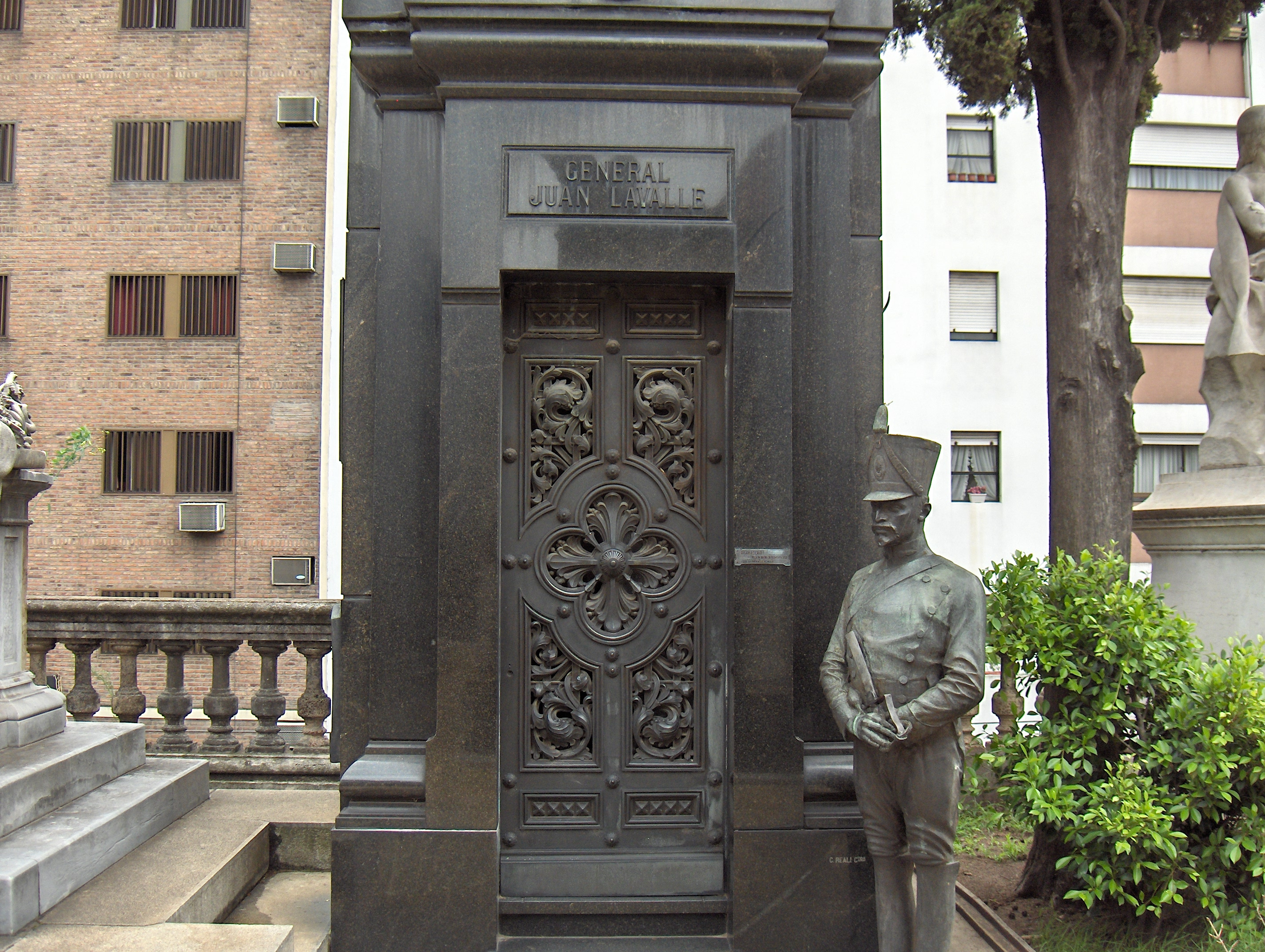
Tomb of Juan Lavalle (Recoleta Cemetery)

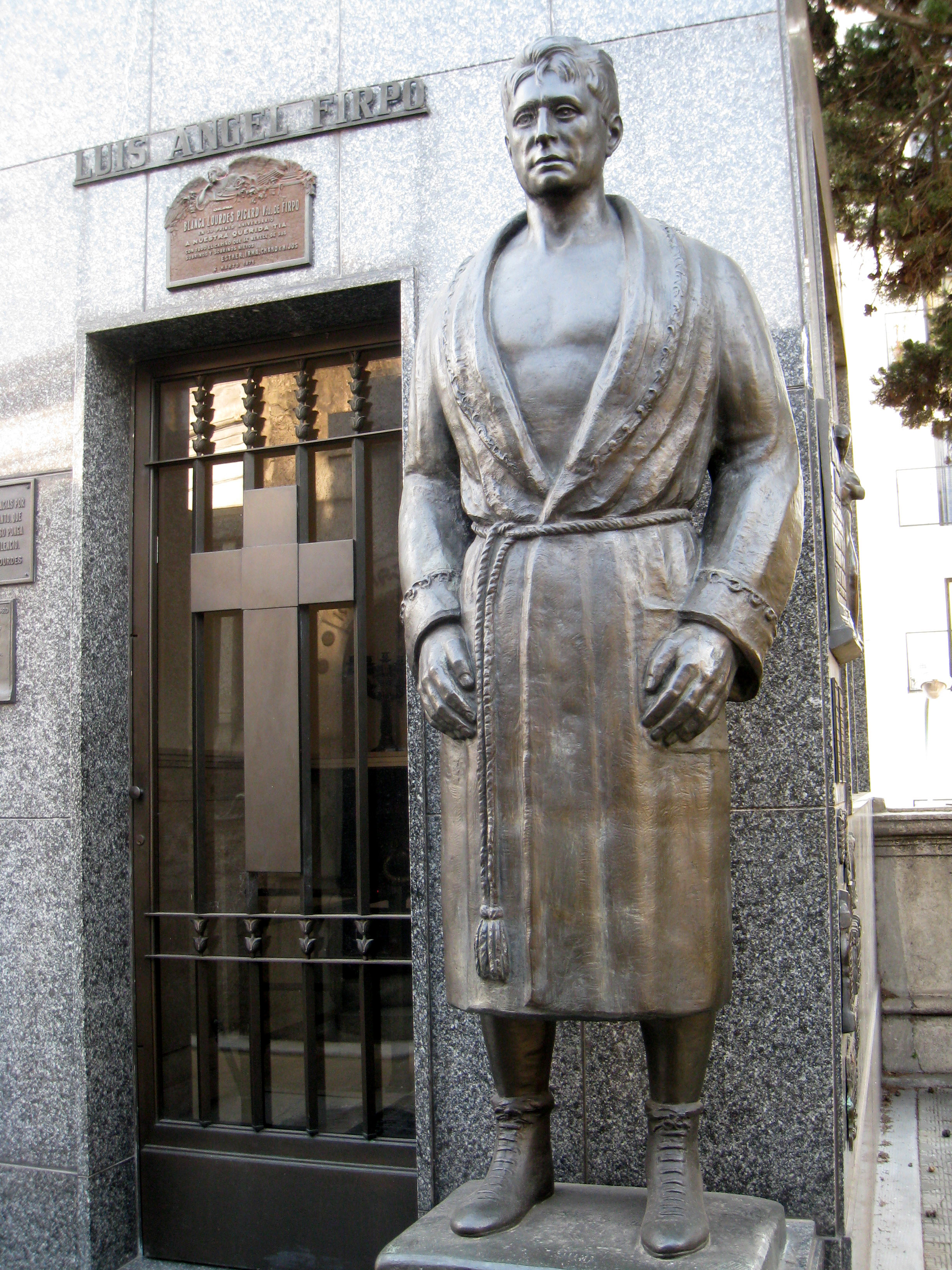
Tomb of Luis Ángel Firpo (Recoleta Cemetery, 1960)
