= La Recoleta Cemetery =

Cemetery located in Buenos Aires, Argentina

- Cementerio de la Recoleta
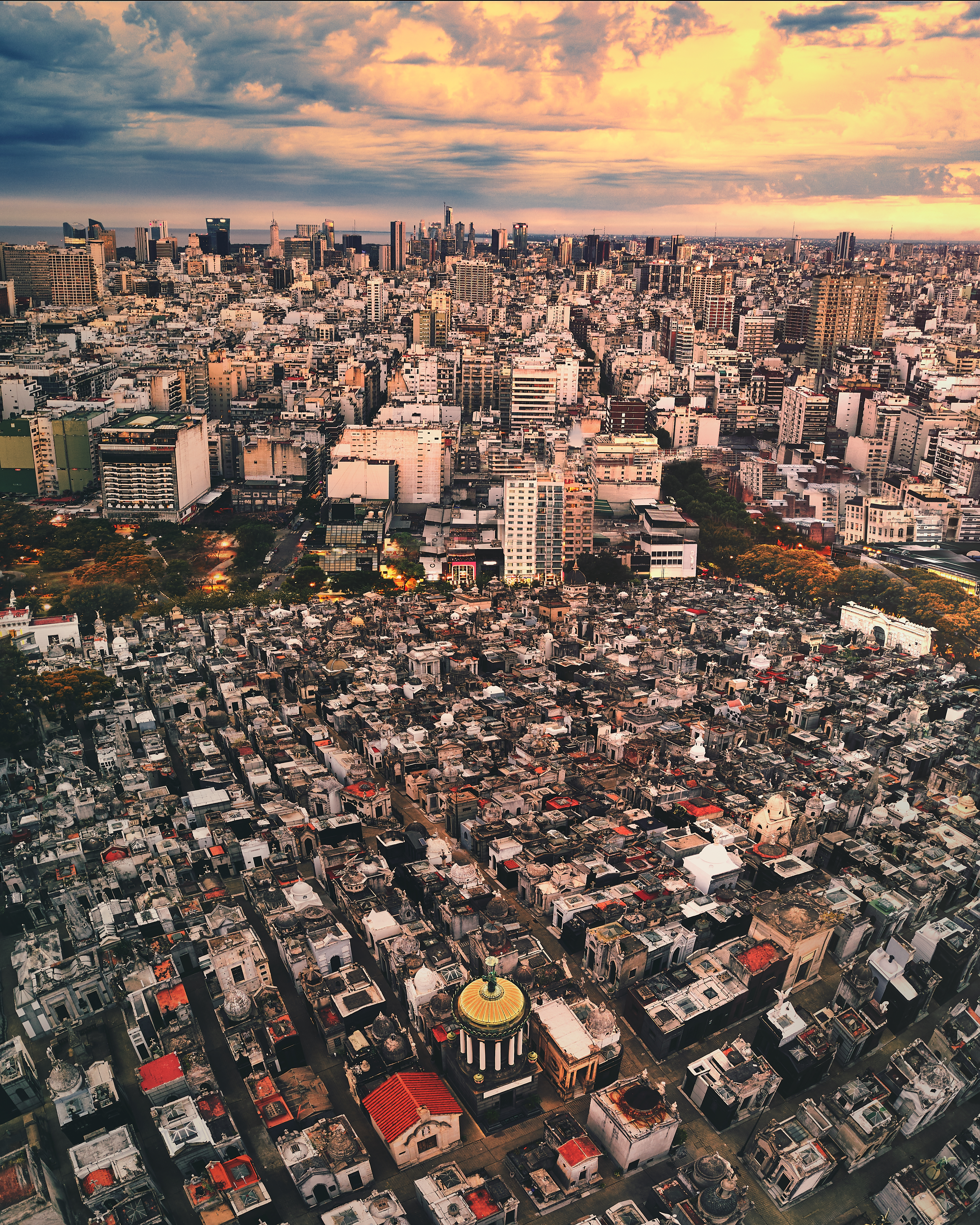
- Aerial view of the cemetery
- Interactive map of La Recoleta Cemetery

Details
- Established: 1822
- Location: Junín 1760, Buenos Aires
- Country: Argentina
- Coordinates: 34°35′17″S 58°23′35″W
- Type: Public
- Size: 5.5 hectares (14 acres)
- No. of graves: 4691 vaults
- Find a Grave: La Recoleta Cemetery

La Recoleta Cemetery (Spanish: Cementerio de la Recoleta) is a cemetery located in the Recoleta neighbourhood of Buenos Aires, Argentina. It contains the graves of notable people, including Eva Perón, presidents of Argentina, Nobel Prize winners, the founder of the Argentine Navy, and military commanders such as Julio Argentino Roca. In 2011, the BBC hailed it as one of the world's best cemeteries, and in 2013, CNN listed it among the 10 most beautiful cemeteries in the world.

== History ==
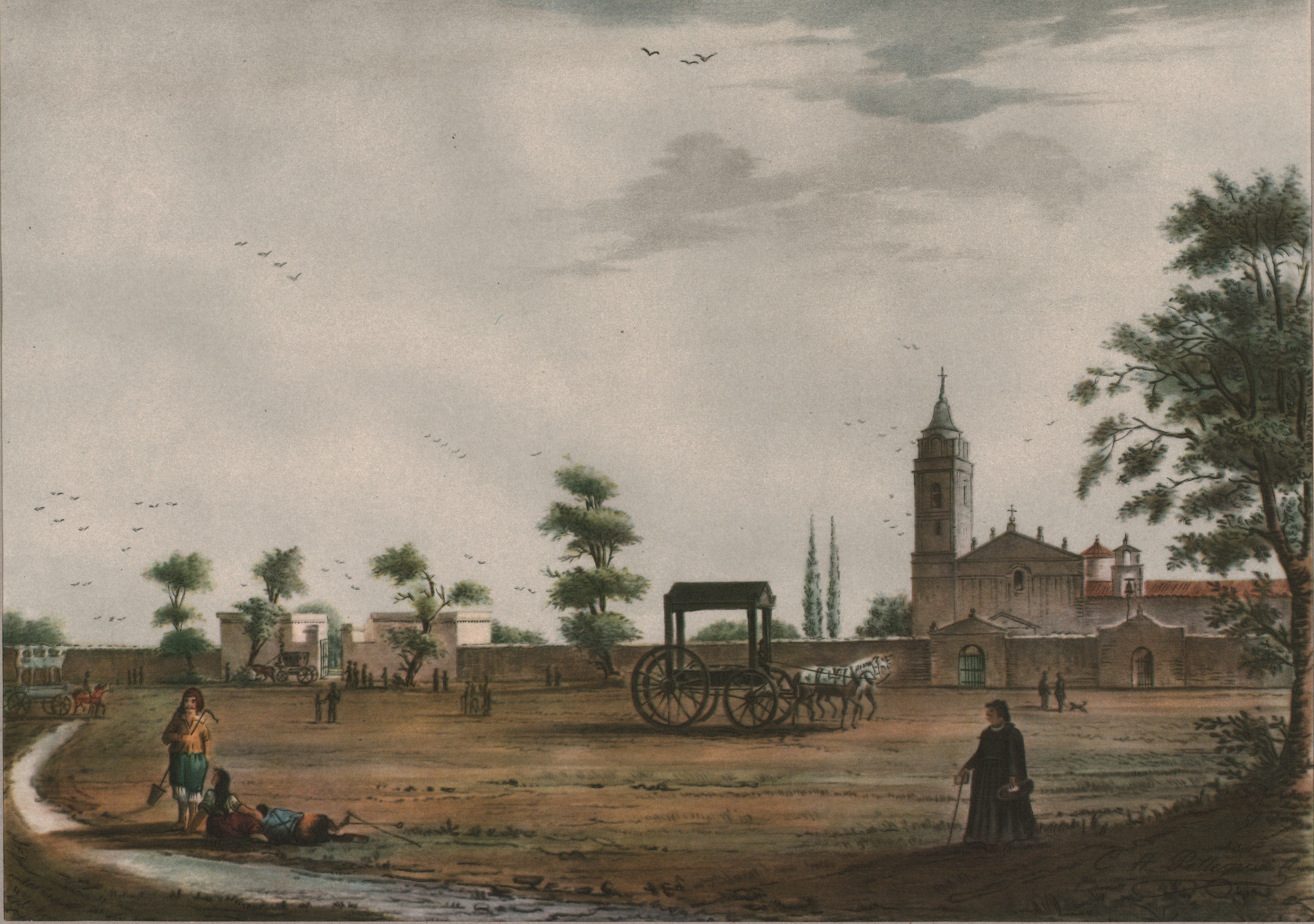
View of the cemetery in 1841.

Franciscan Recollect monks (los recoletos) arrived in this area, then the outskirts of Buenos Aires, in the early eighteenth century. The cemetery is built around the Recollect Convent (Convento de la Recoleta) and a church, Our Lady of the Pillar (Iglesia de Nuestra Señora del Pilar), built in 1732.

The order was disbanded in 1822, and the garden of the convent converted into the first public cemetery in Buenos Aires. Inaugurated on 17 November of the same year under the name of Cementerio del Norte (Northern Cemetery), those responsible for its creation were the then-Governor Martin Rodríguez, who would be eventually buried in the cemetery, and government minister Bernardino Rivadavia.

The 1822 layout was undertaken by French civil engineer Próspero Catelin, who also designed the current facade of the Buenos Aires Metropolitan Cathedral. The cemetery was last remodeled in 1881, while Torcuato de Alvear was mayor of the city, by the Italian architect Juan Antonio Buschiazzo.

== Description ==
Set in 5.5 hectares (14 acres), the site contains 4691 vaults, all above ground, of which 94 have been declared National Historical Monuments by the Argentine government and are protected by the state. The entrance to the cemetery is through neo-classical gates with tall Doric columns. The cemetery contains many elaborate marble mausoleums, decorated with statues, in a wide variety of architectural styles such as Art Deco, Art Nouveau, Baroque, and Neo-Gothic, and most materials used between 1880 and 1930 in the construction of tombs were imported from Paris and Milan. The entire cemetery is laid out in sections like city blocks, with wide tree-lined main walkways branching into sidewalks filled with mausoleums. These mausoleums are still being used by rich families in Argentina that have their own vault and keep their deceased there. While many of the mausoleums are in fine shape and well-maintained, others have fallen into disrepair. Several can be found with broken glass and littered with rubbish. Among many memorials are works by notable Argentine sculptors, Lola Mora and Luis Perlotti for instance. The tomb of Liliana Crociati de Szaszak, due to its unusual design, is of special interest.

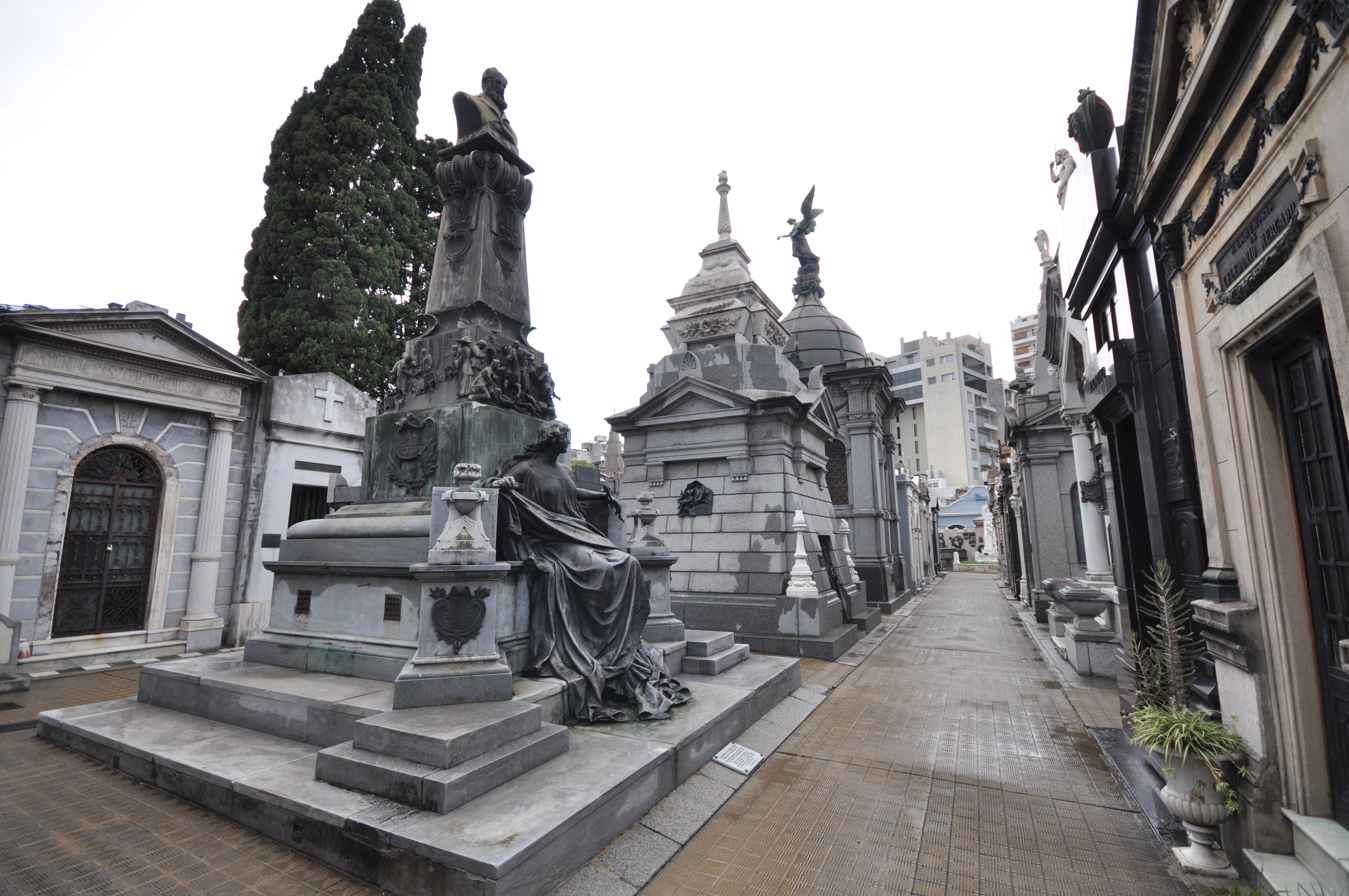
View of one of the alleys

The cemetery also hosts a colony of stray cats which has also become an attraction. As of 2024, the resident feline population has decreased from a peak of 60 in the 1960s to about 12 due to adoption drives.

== Notable interments ==
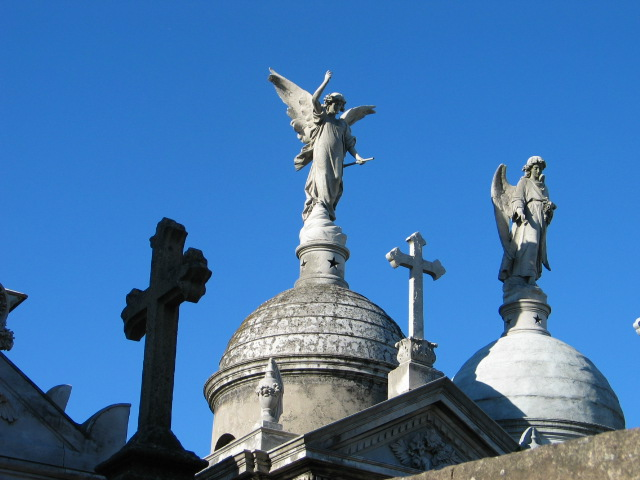
View of the domes.

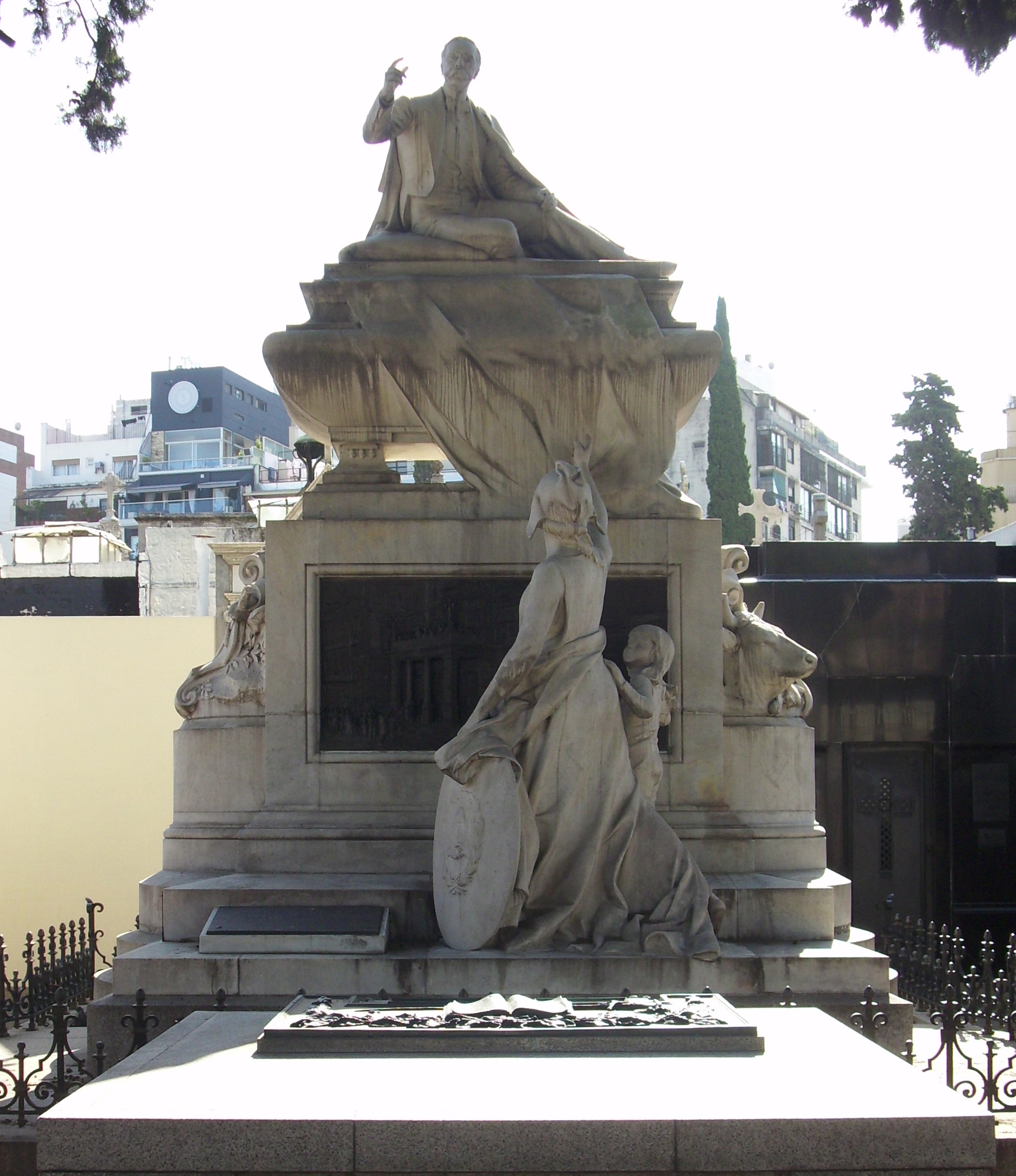
Mausoleum of President Carlos Pellegrini.

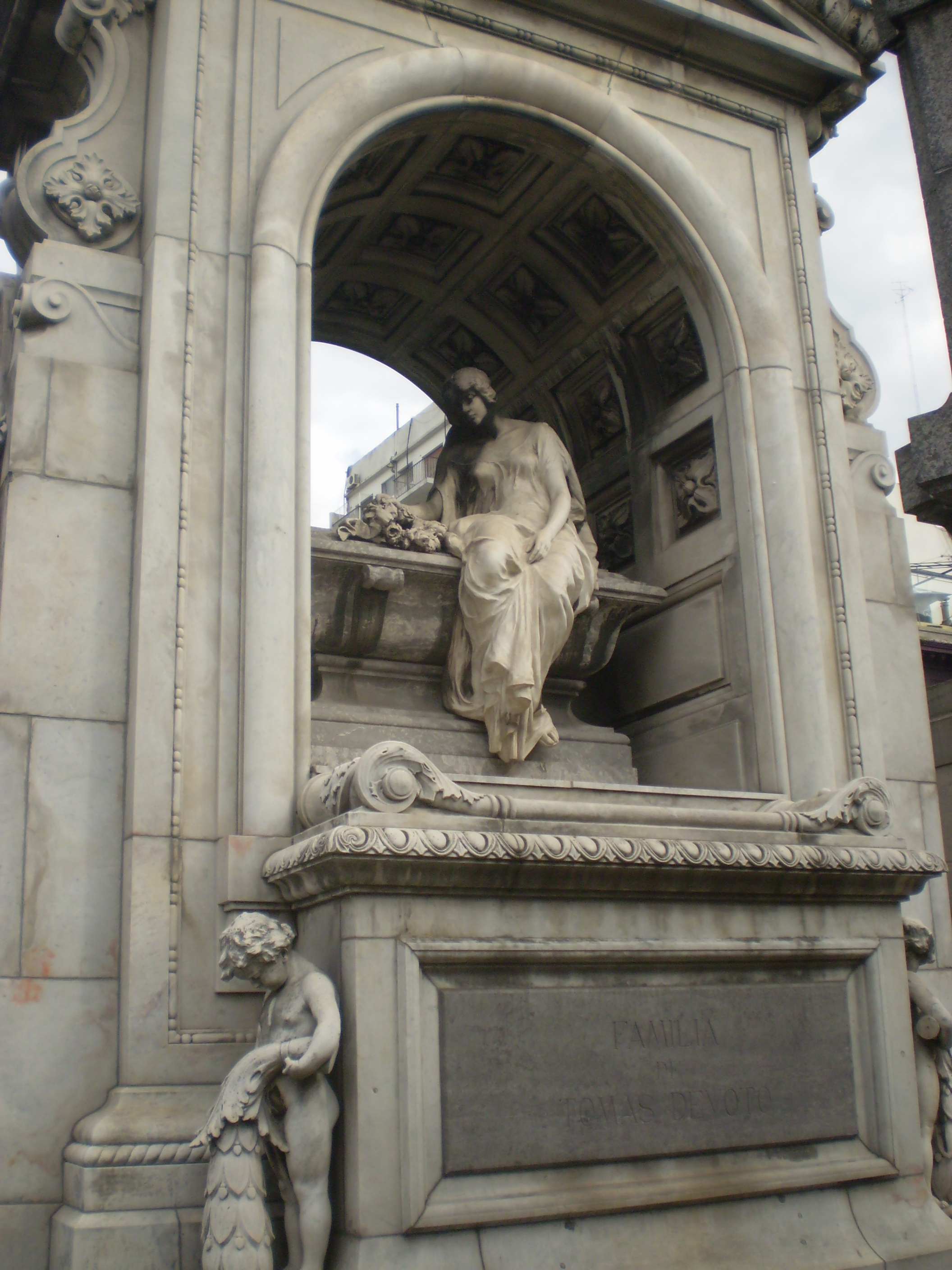
Mausoleum of Tomas Devoto

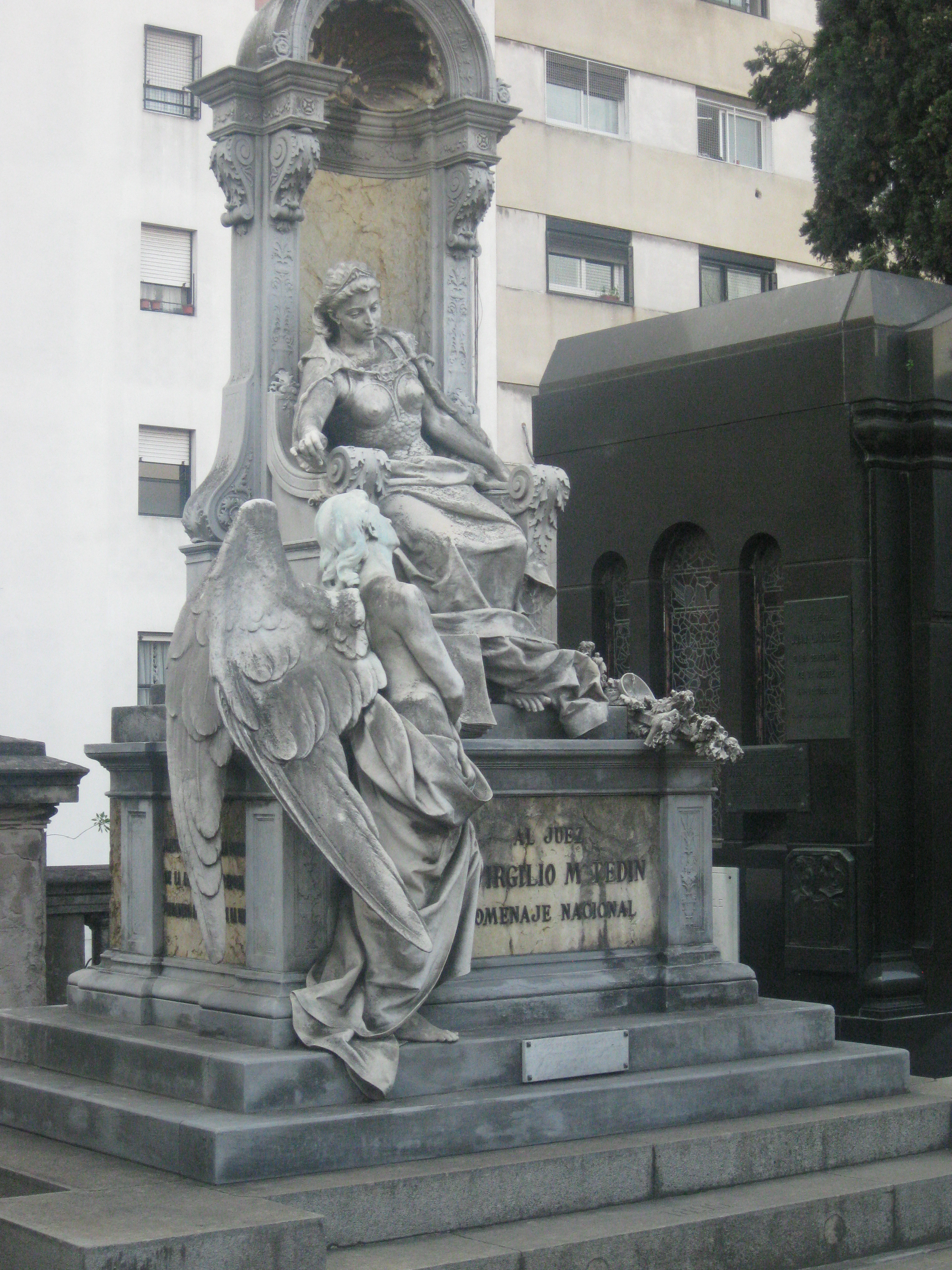
Mausoleum of Dr. Virgilio Tedín

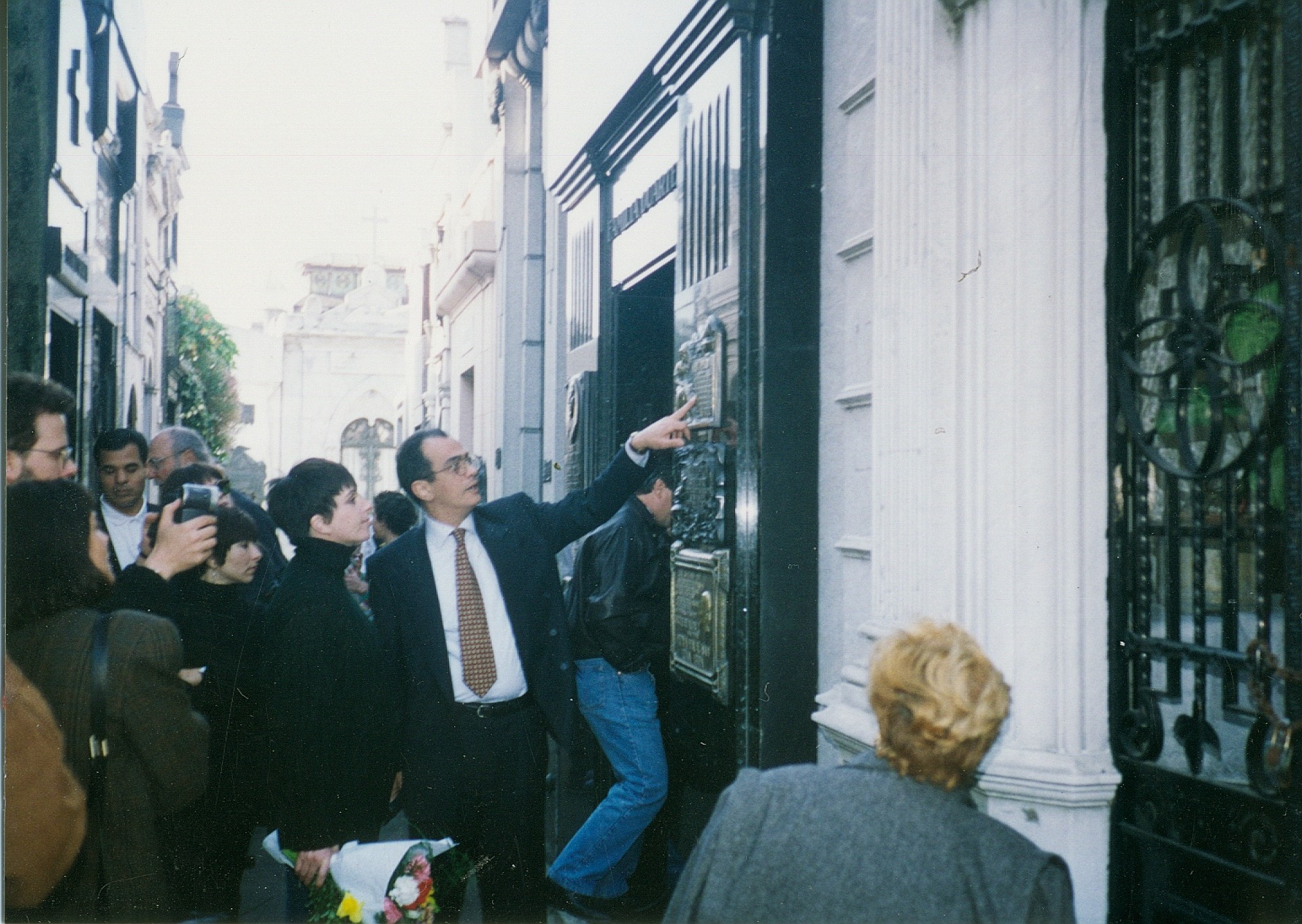
Liza Minnelli visiting tomb of First Lady Eva Perón in 1993

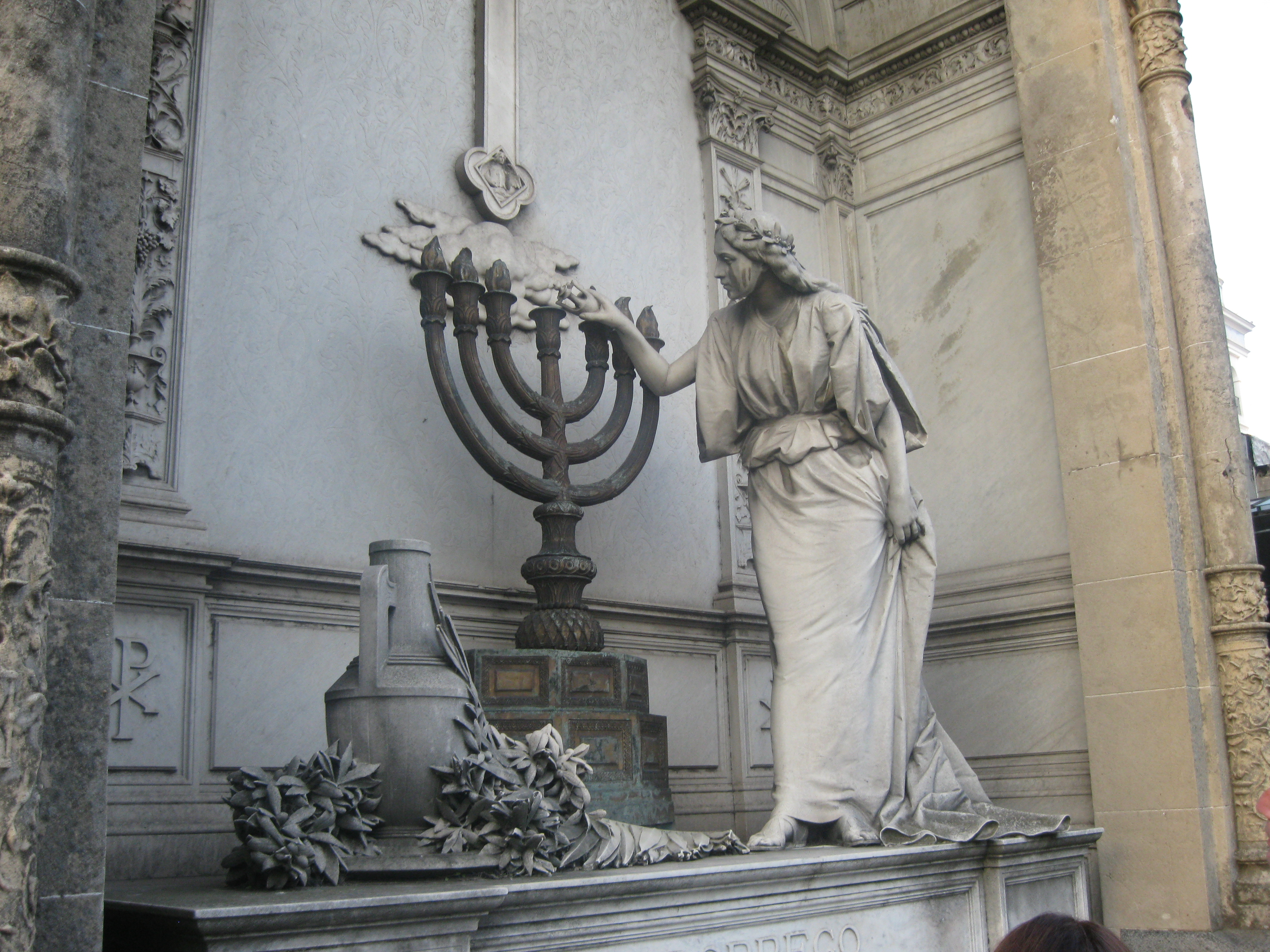
Mausoleum of Dorrego-Ortiz Basualdo family

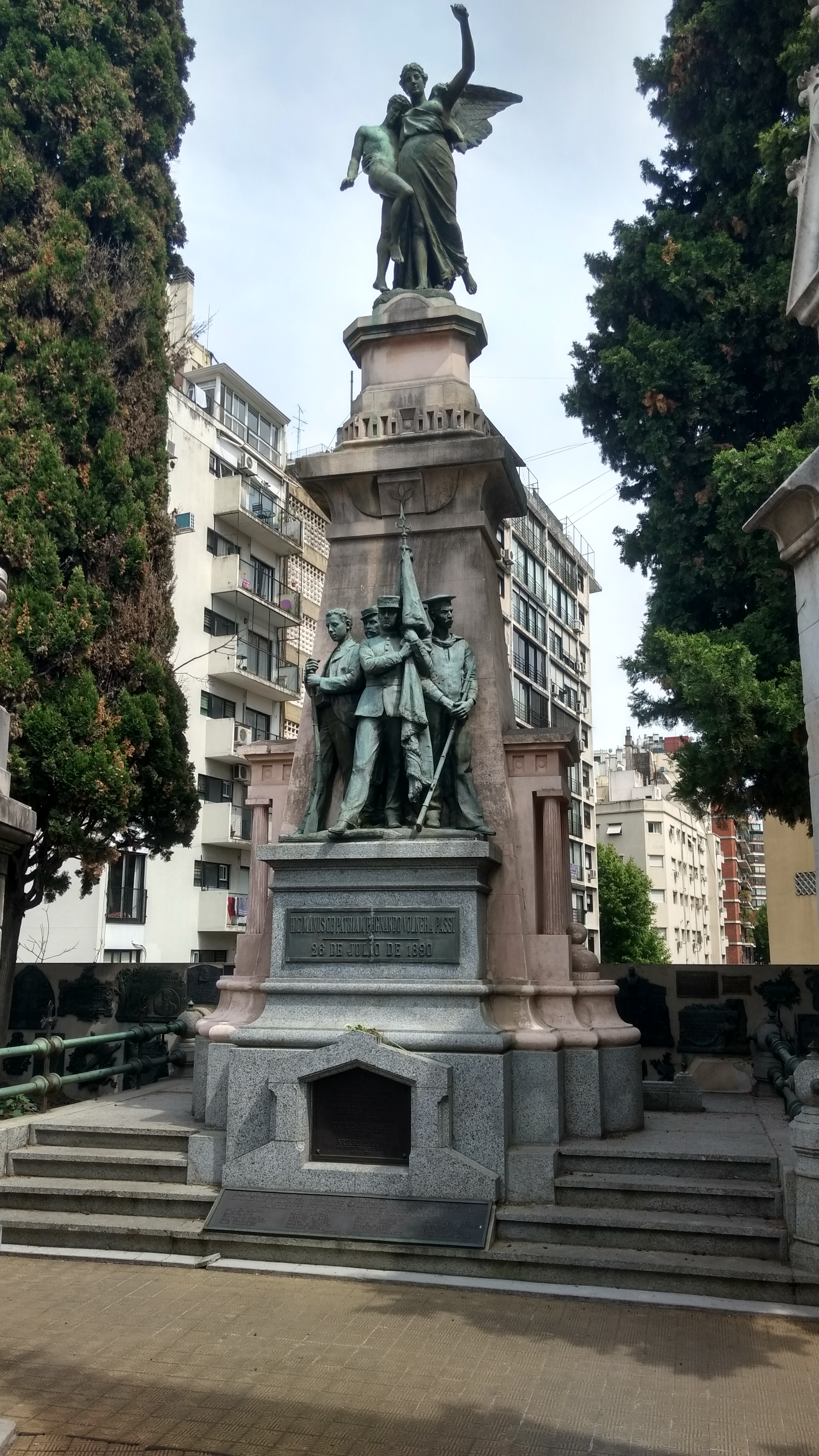
Mausoleum of Leandro N. Alem

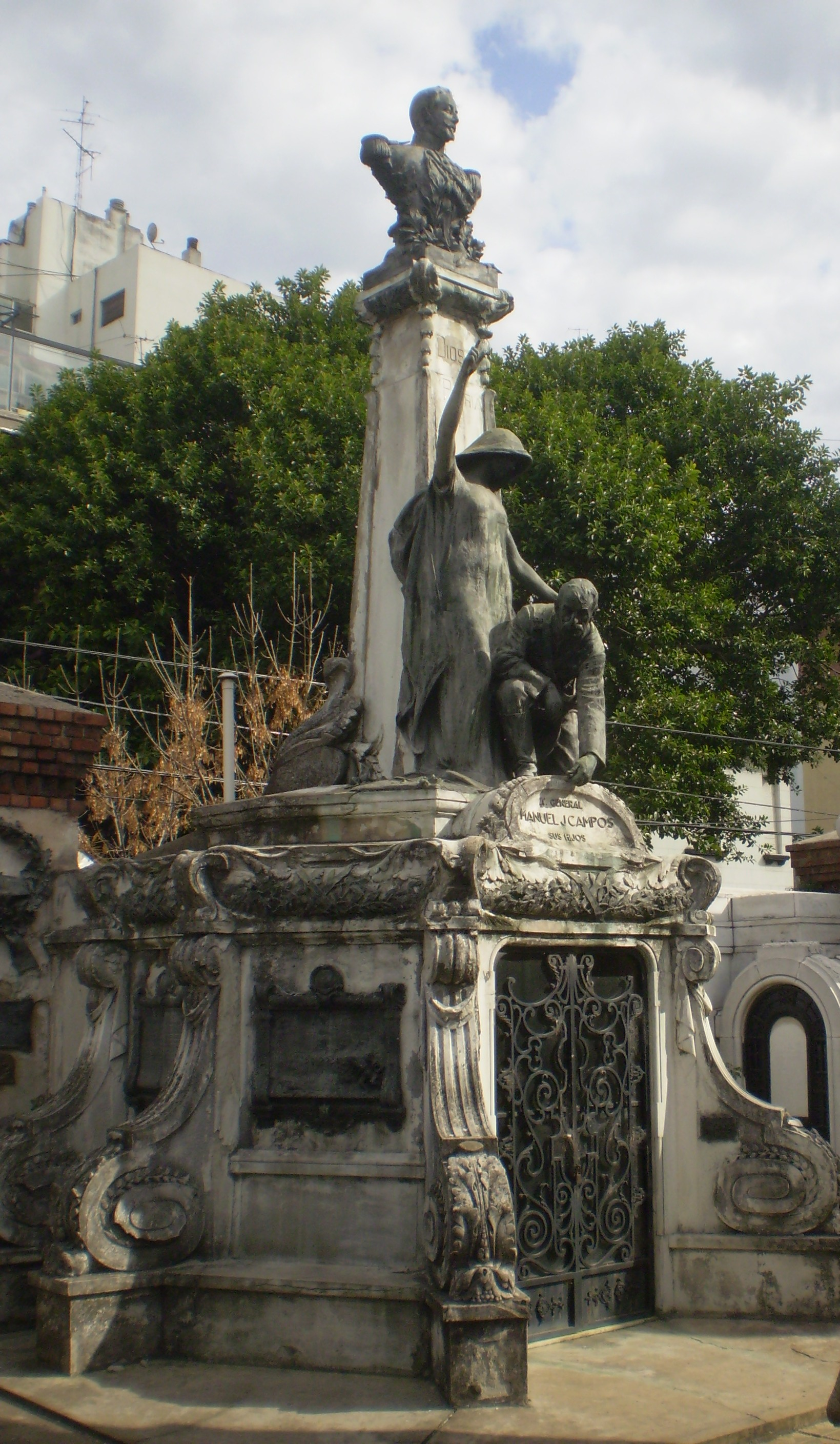
Mausoleum of Manuel J. Campos.

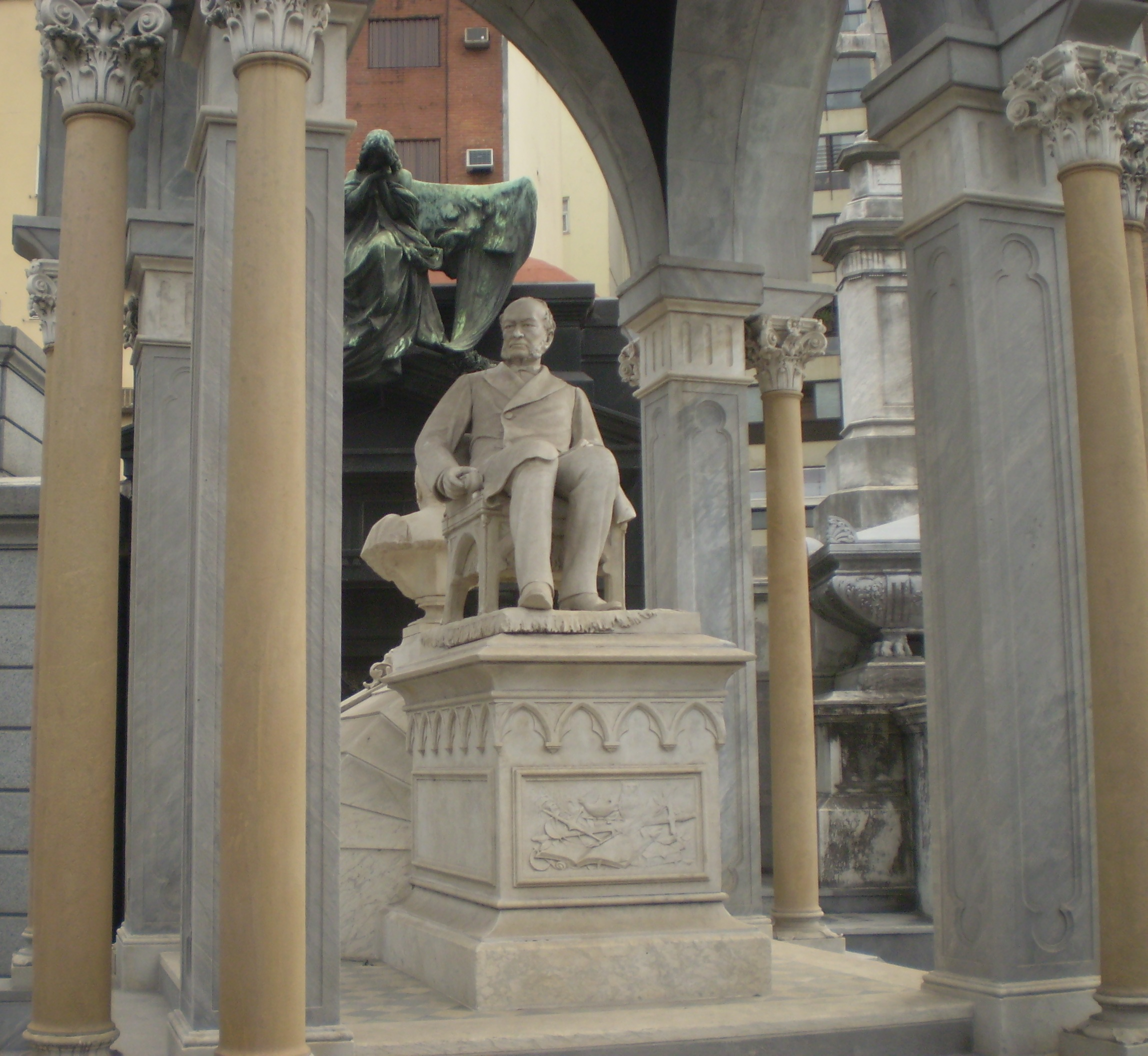
Mausoleum of Salvador Maria del Carril

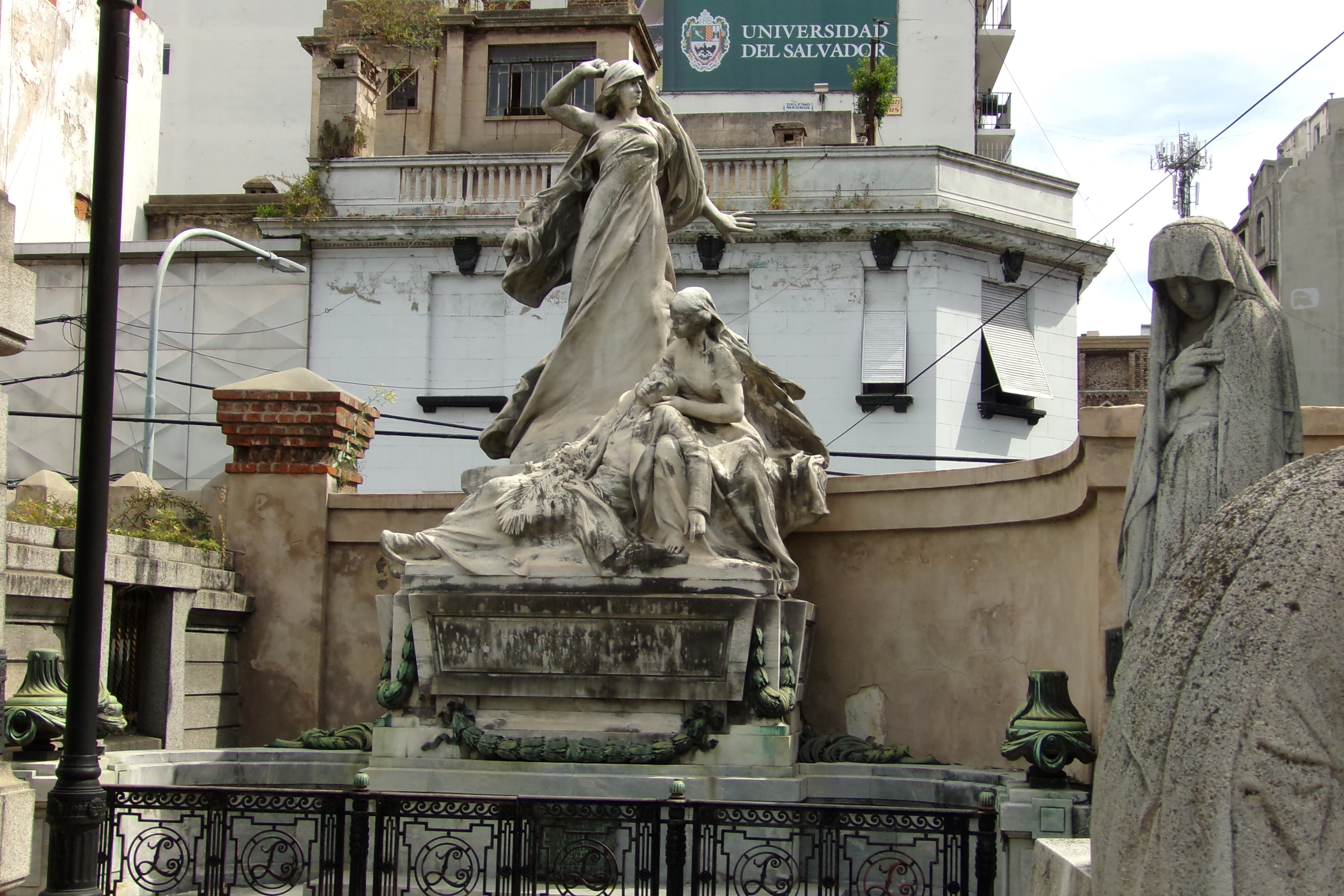
Mausoleum of Lartigau family

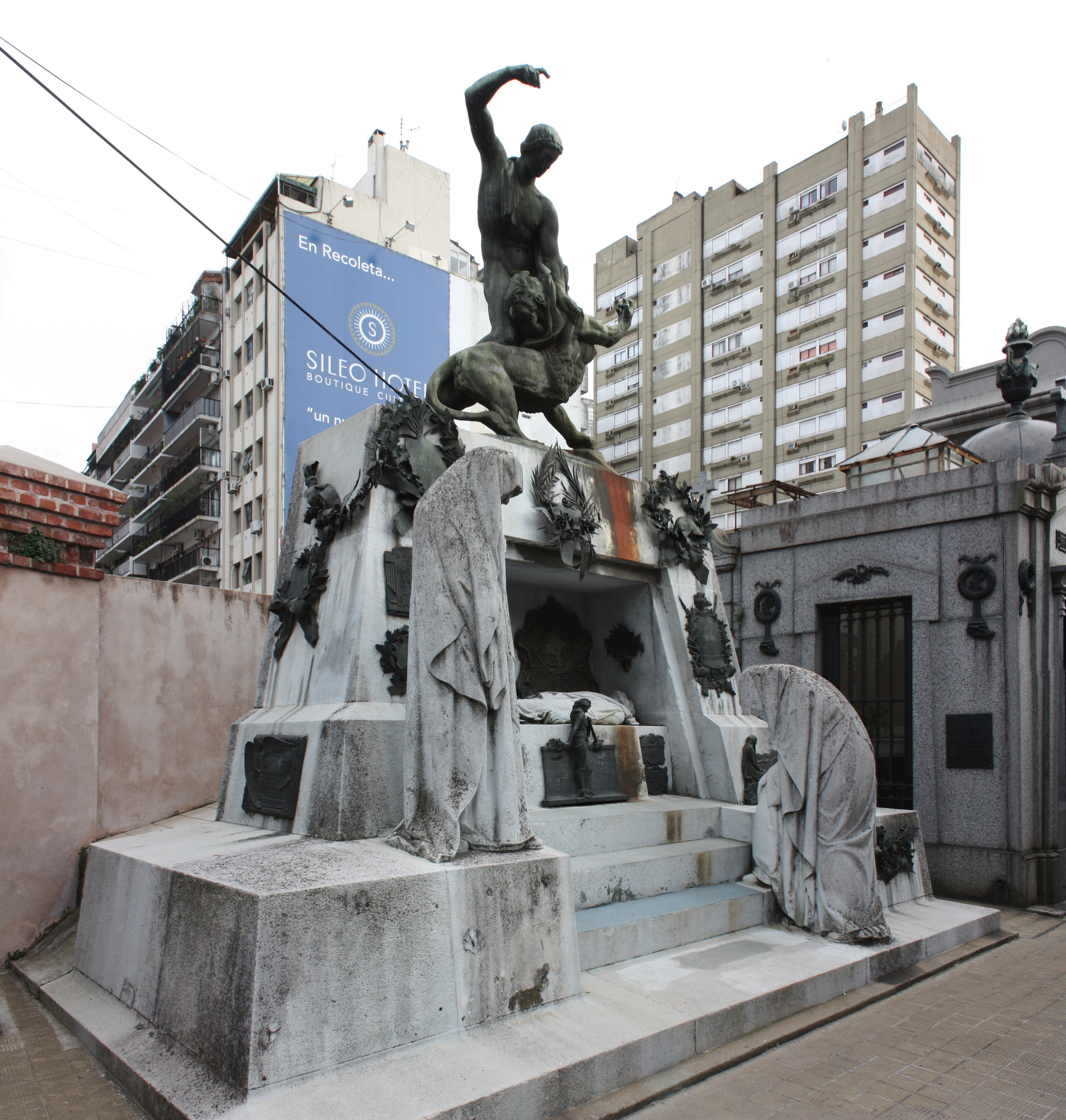
Mausoleum of Ramón L Falcón

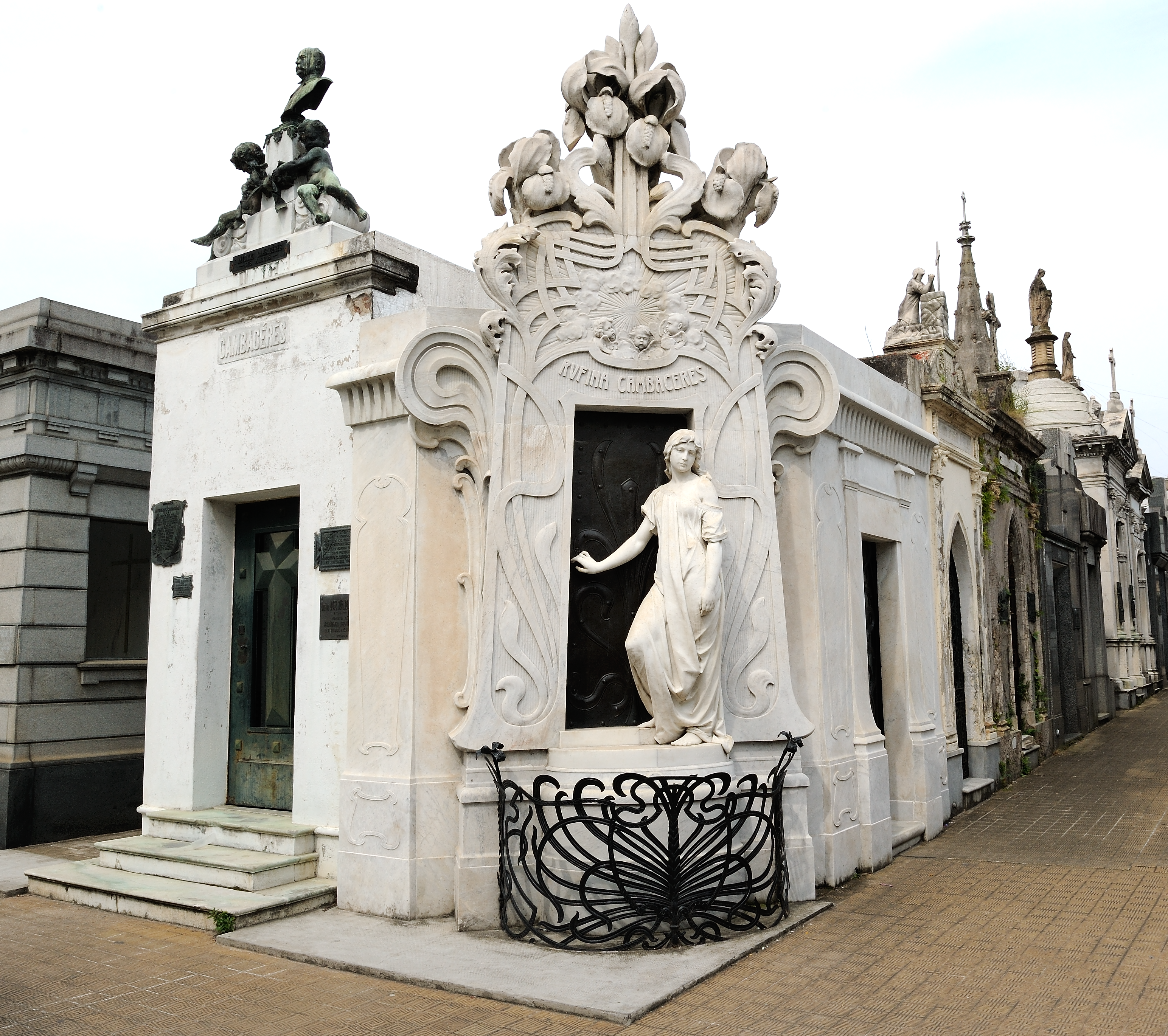
Tomb of Rufina Cambaceres

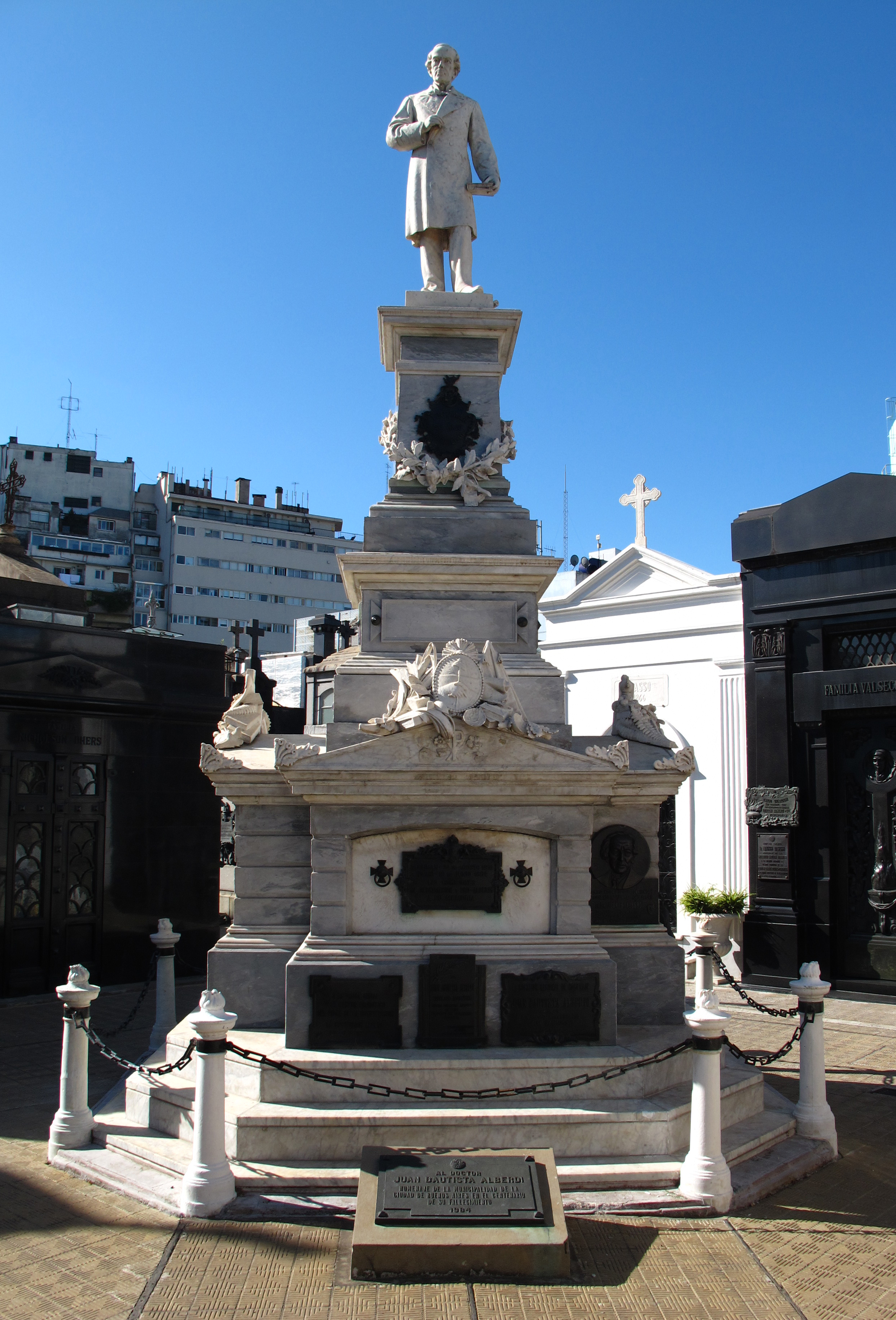
Tomb of Juan Bautista Alberdi

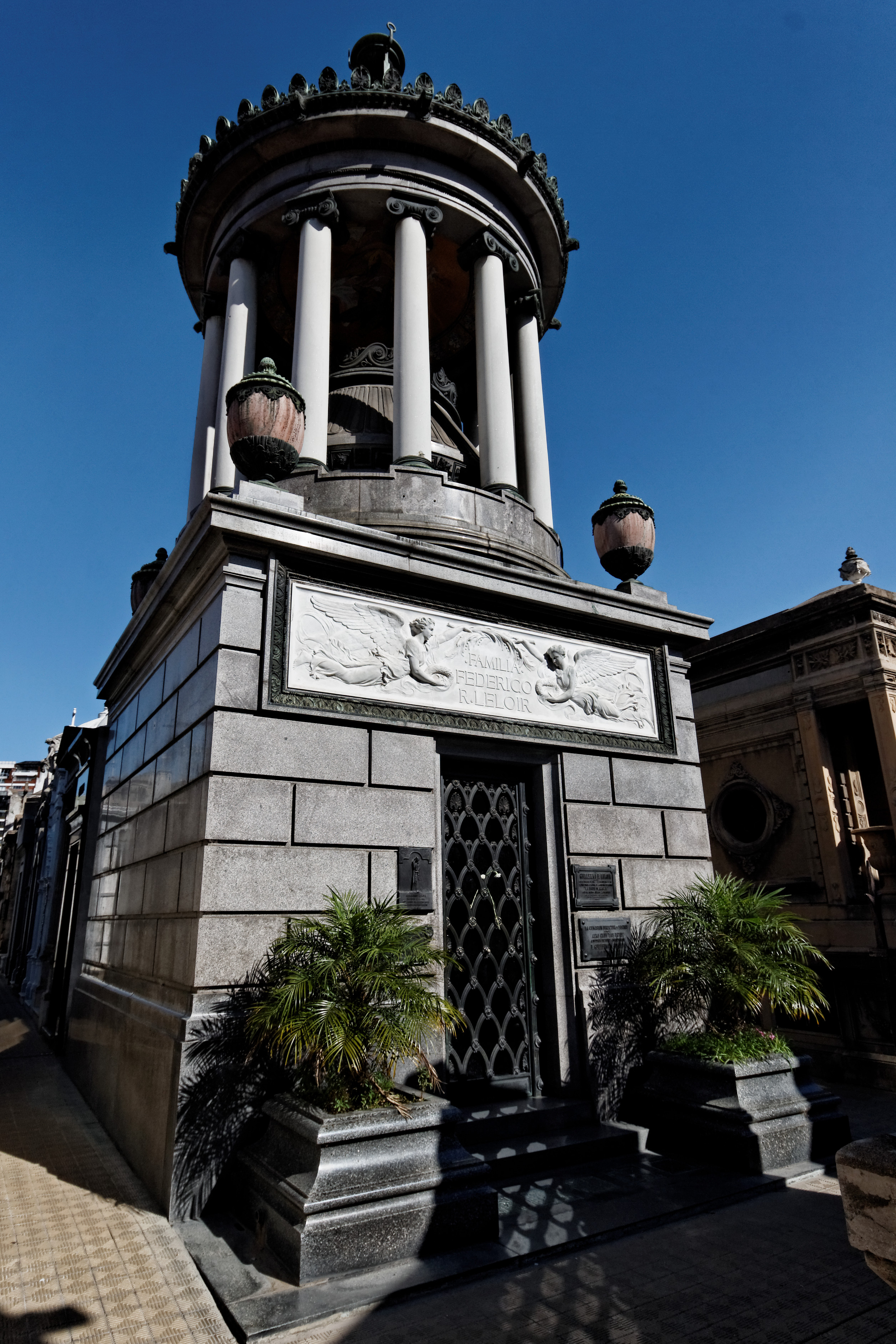
Mausoleum of Nobel Prize laureate Luis Federico Leloir.

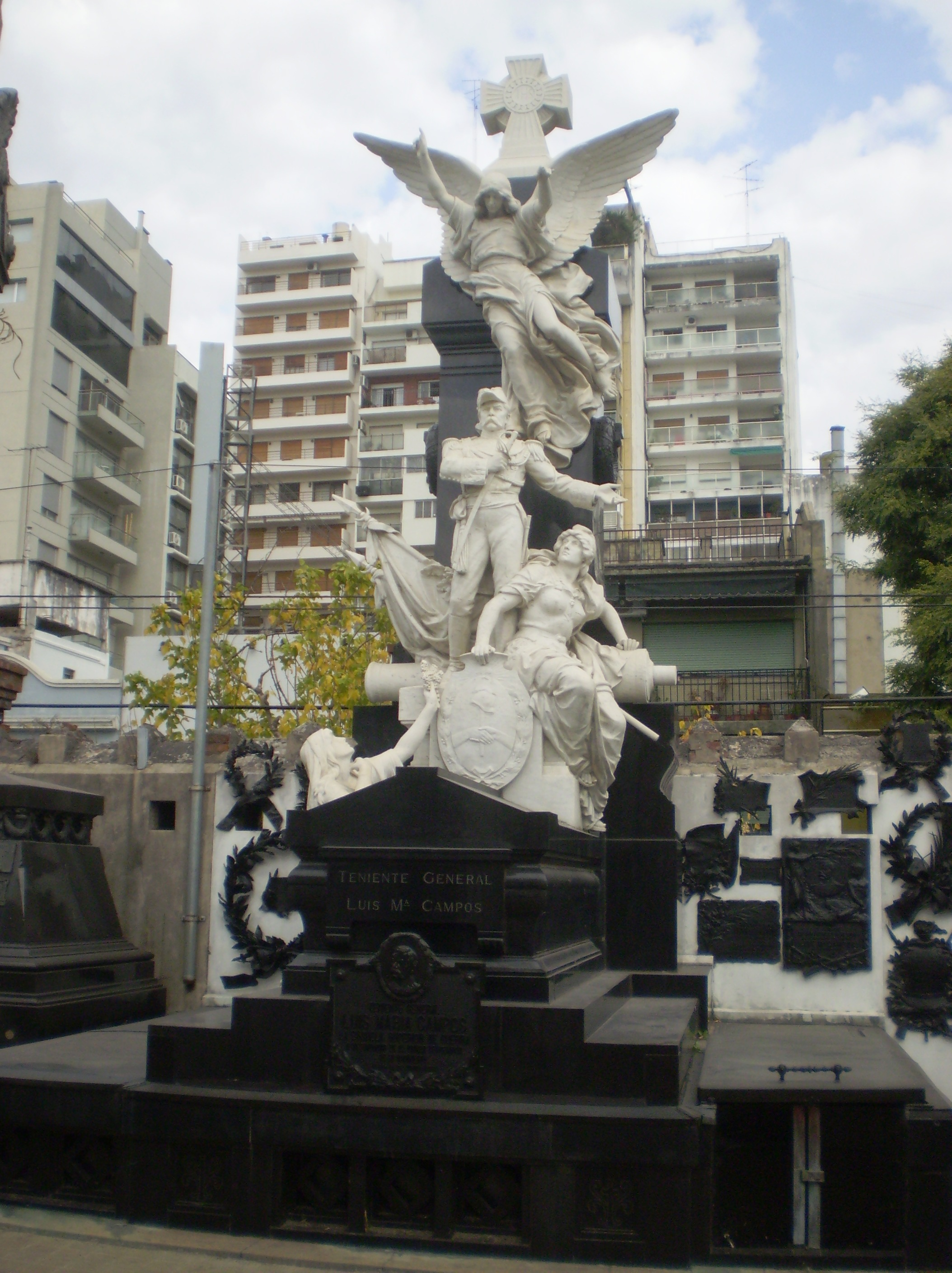
Mausoleum of General Luis María Campos, designed by French sculptor Jules Coutan.

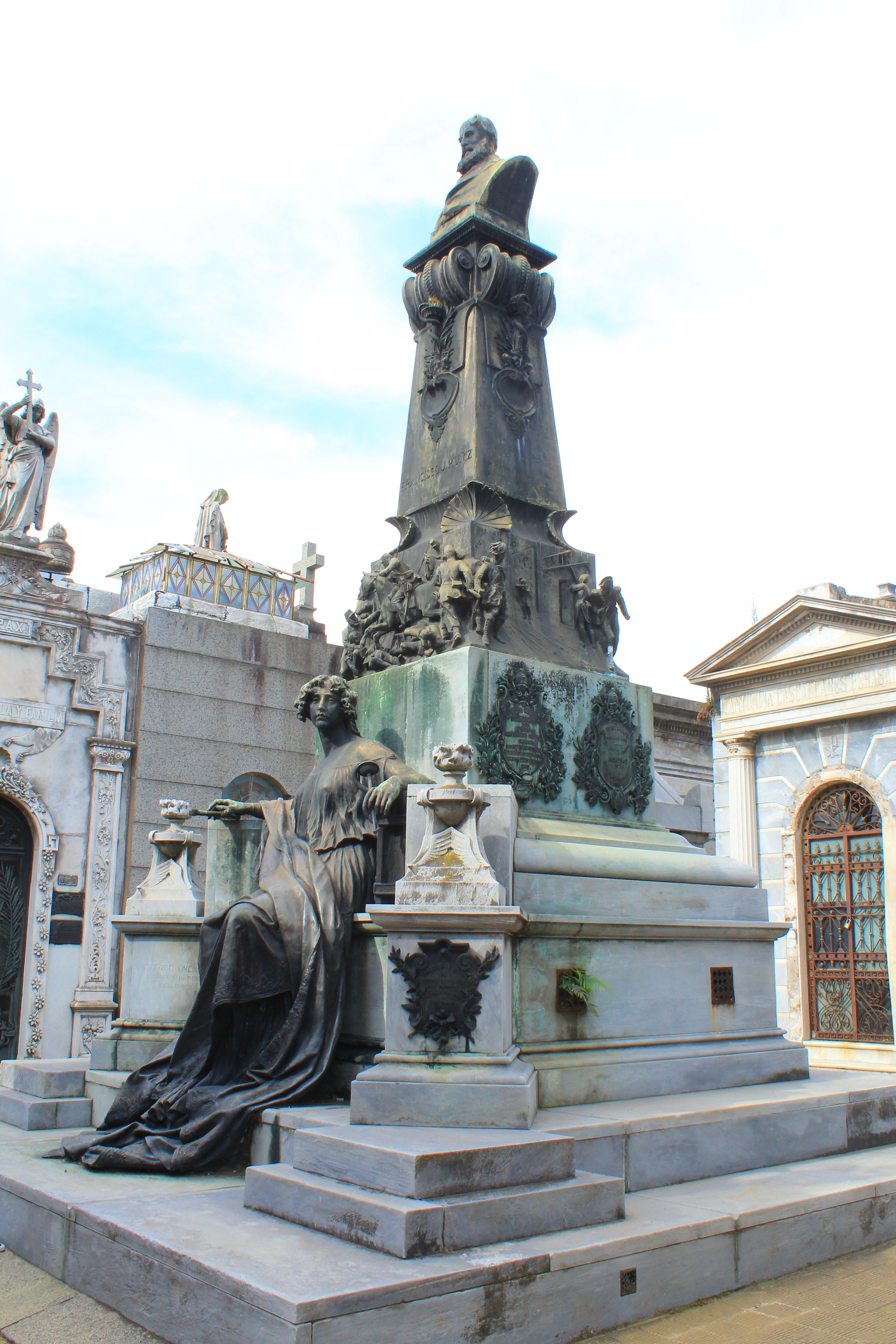
Mausoleum of Dr Francisco Javier Muñiz (1807–1871) hero of the Yellow Fever epidemic in Buenos Aires.

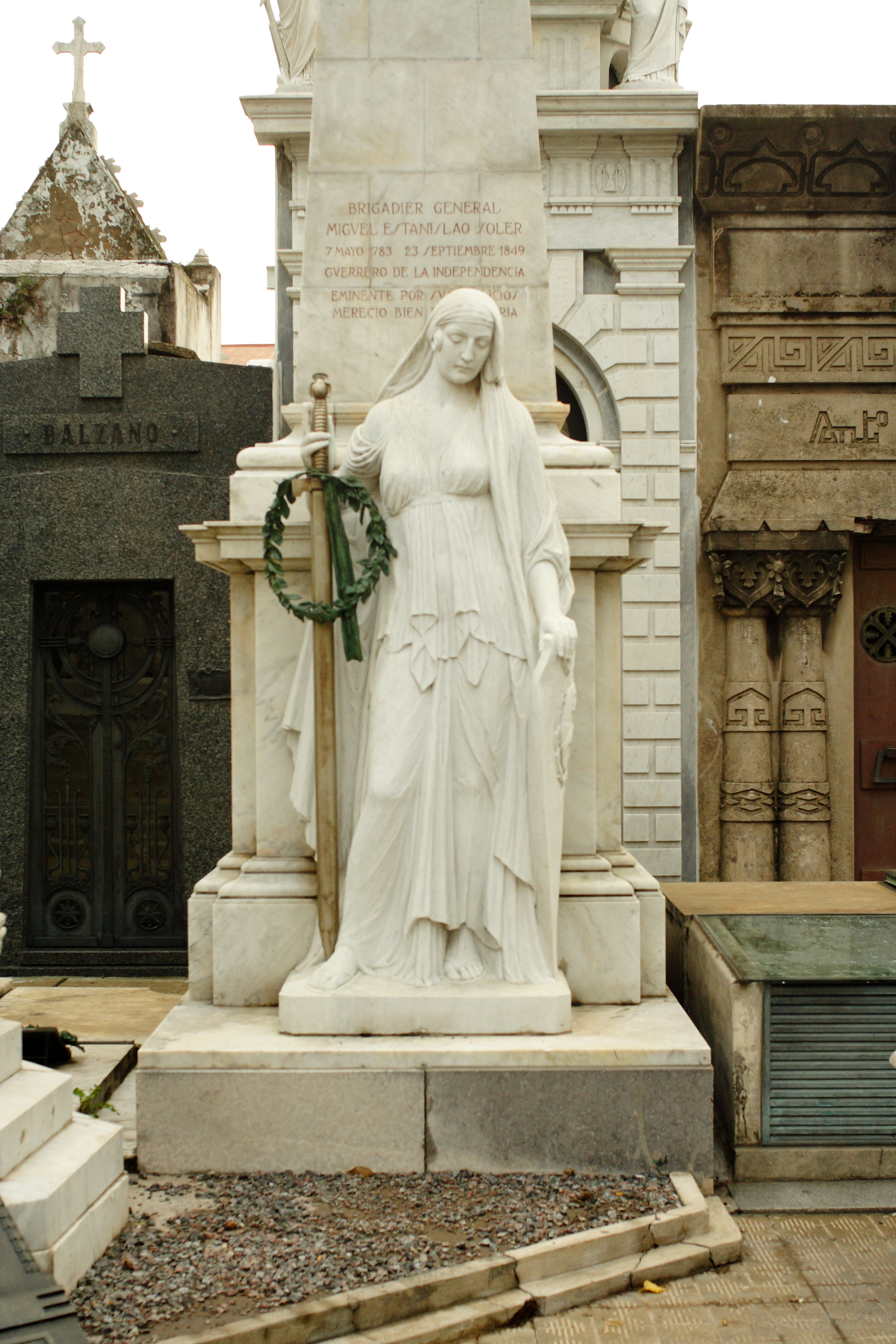
Tomb of General Miguel Estanislao Soler.

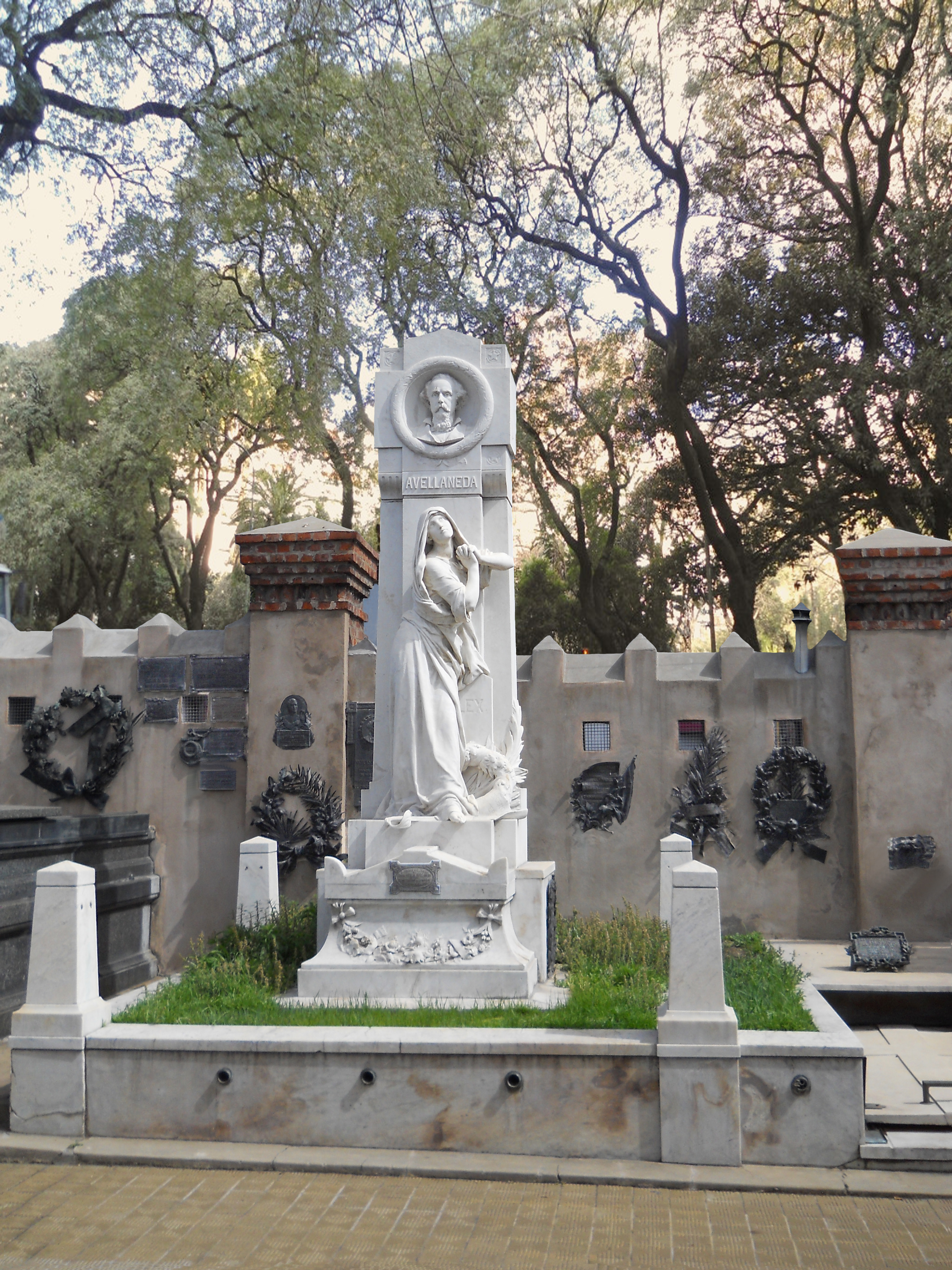
Mausoleum of President Nicolás Avellaneda, devised by the aforementioned French sculptor Jules Coutan.

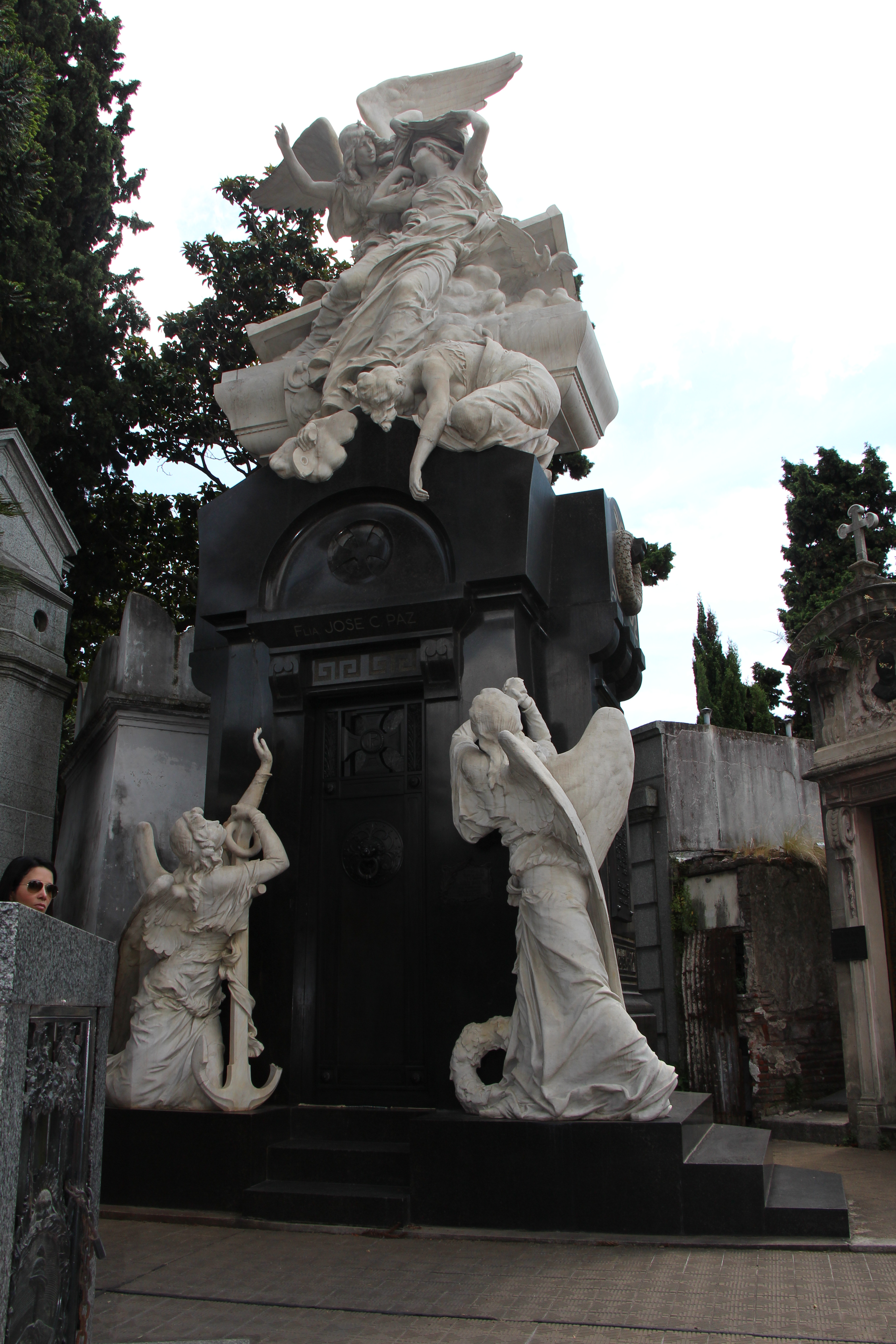
Mausoleum of statesman, diplomat, and journalist José Clemente Paz, created by French sculptor Jules Coutan.

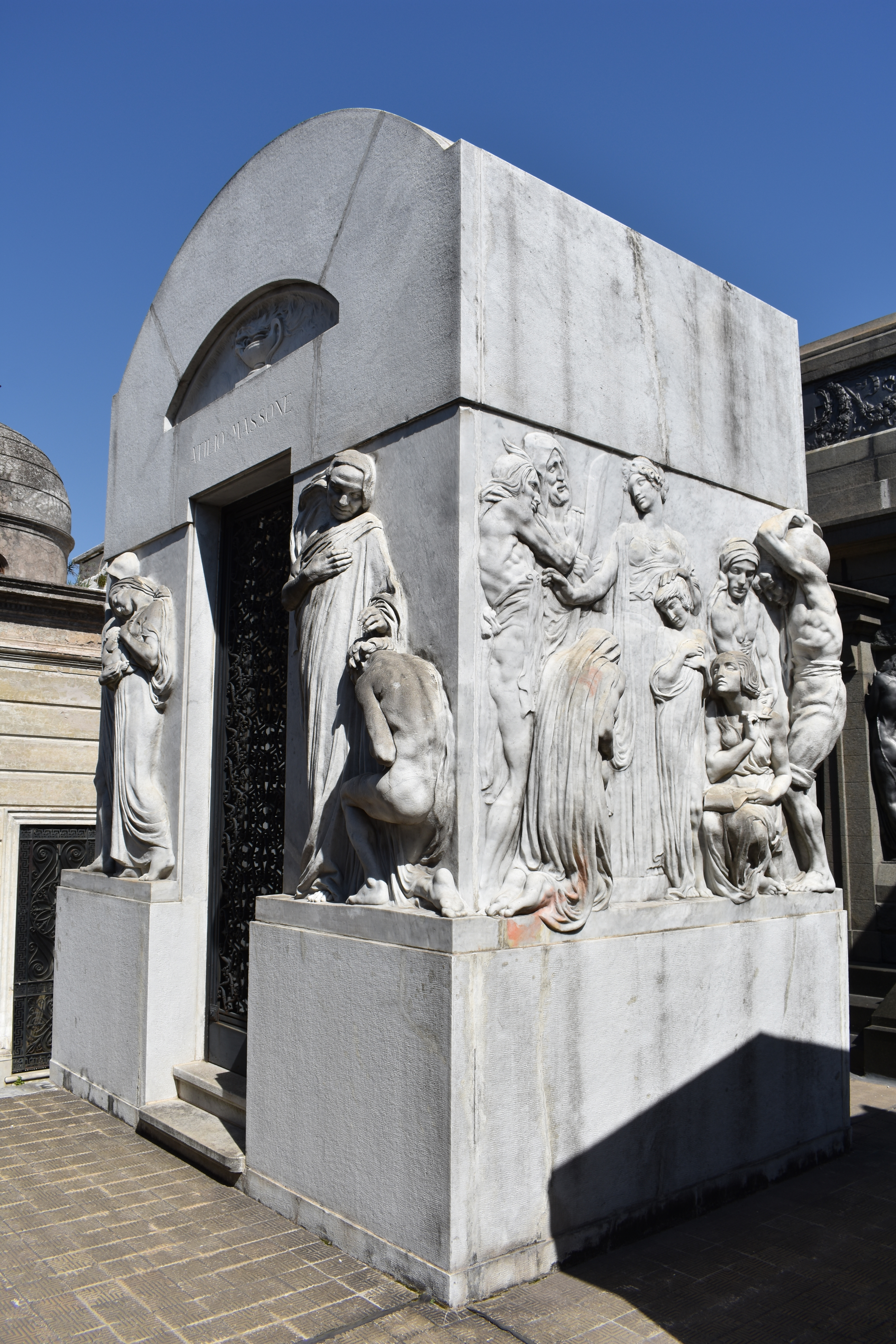
Mausoleum of Atilio Massone

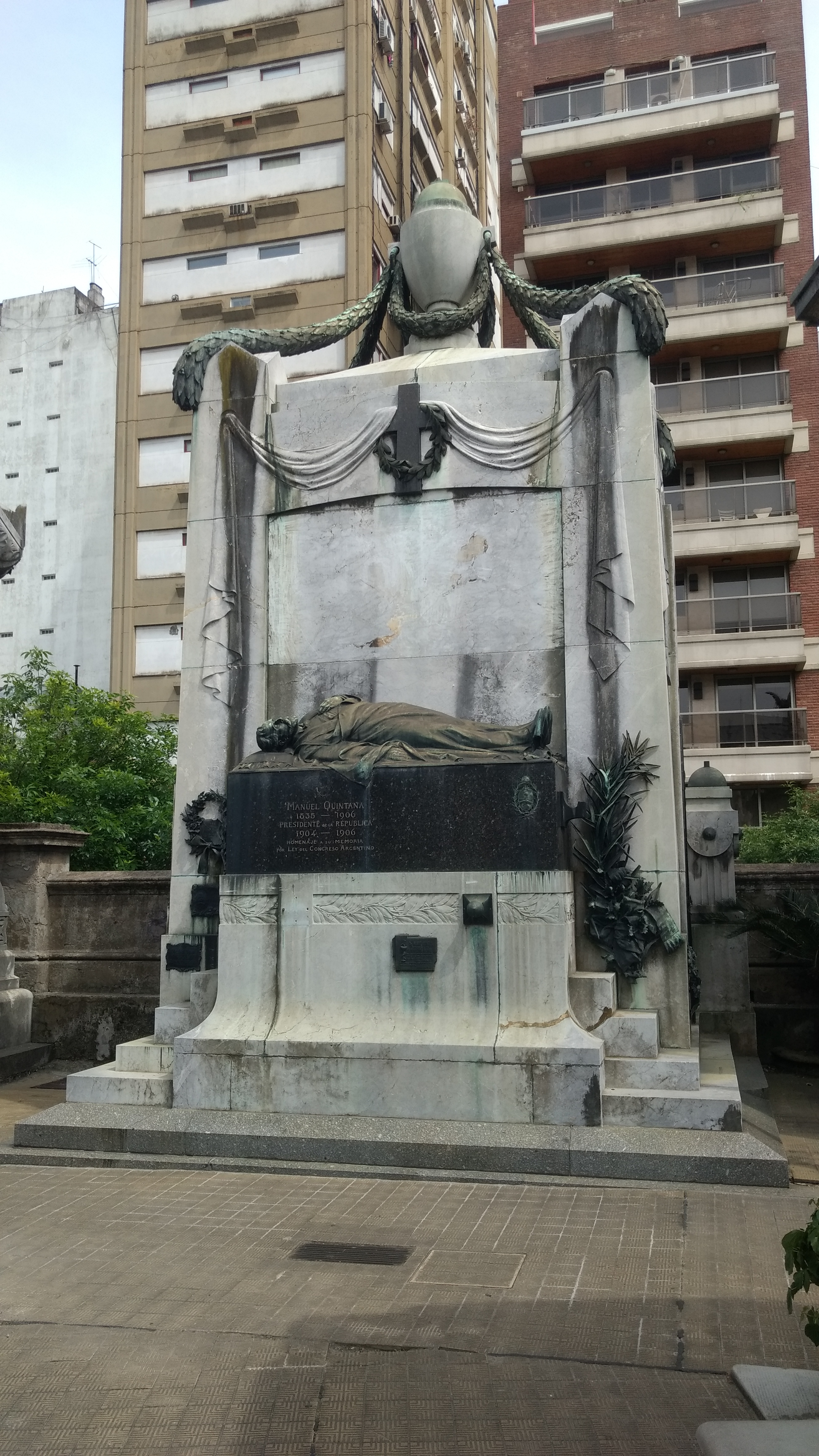
Mausoleum of President Manuel Quintana

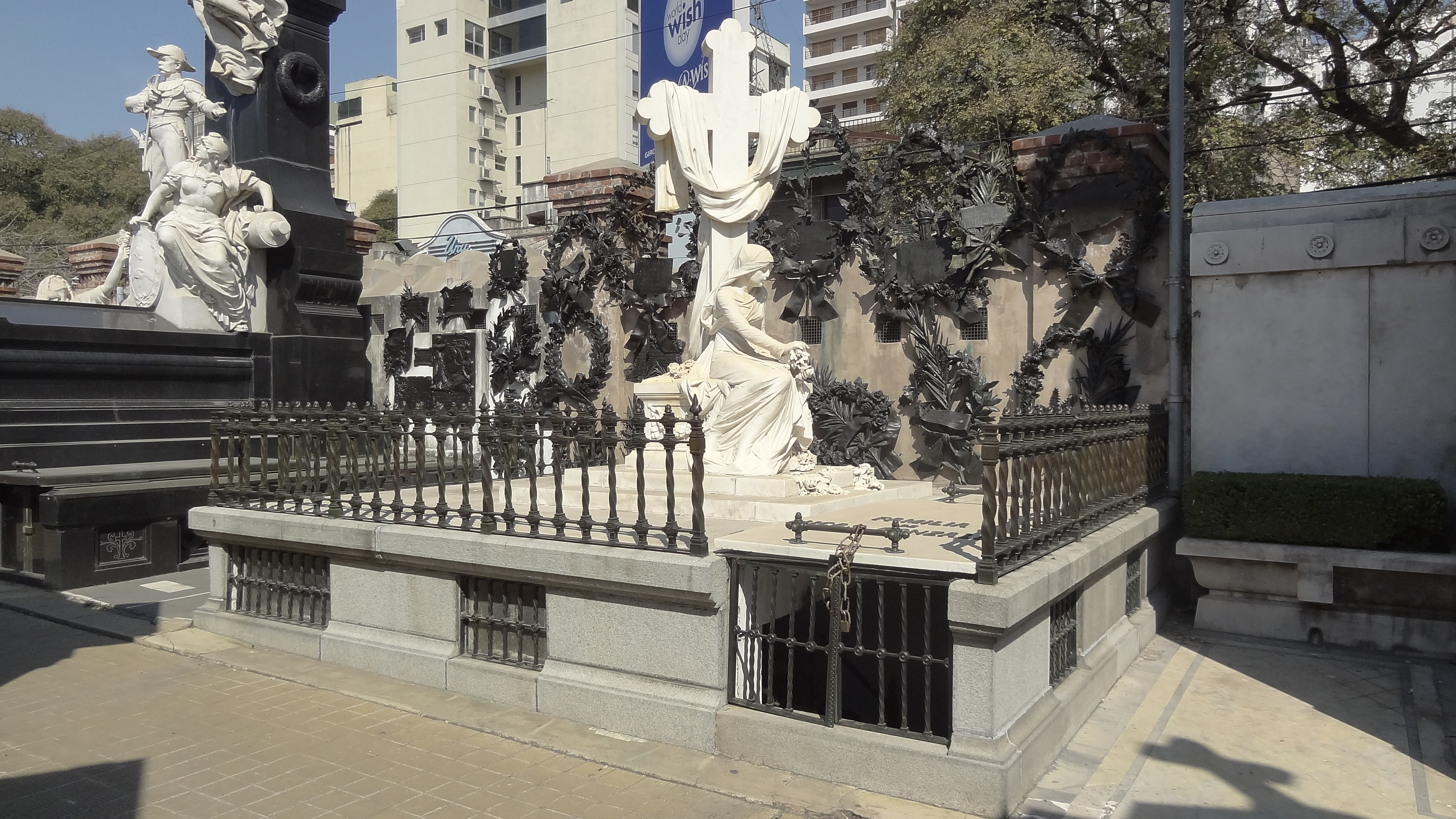
Tomb of President Roque Sáenz Peña.

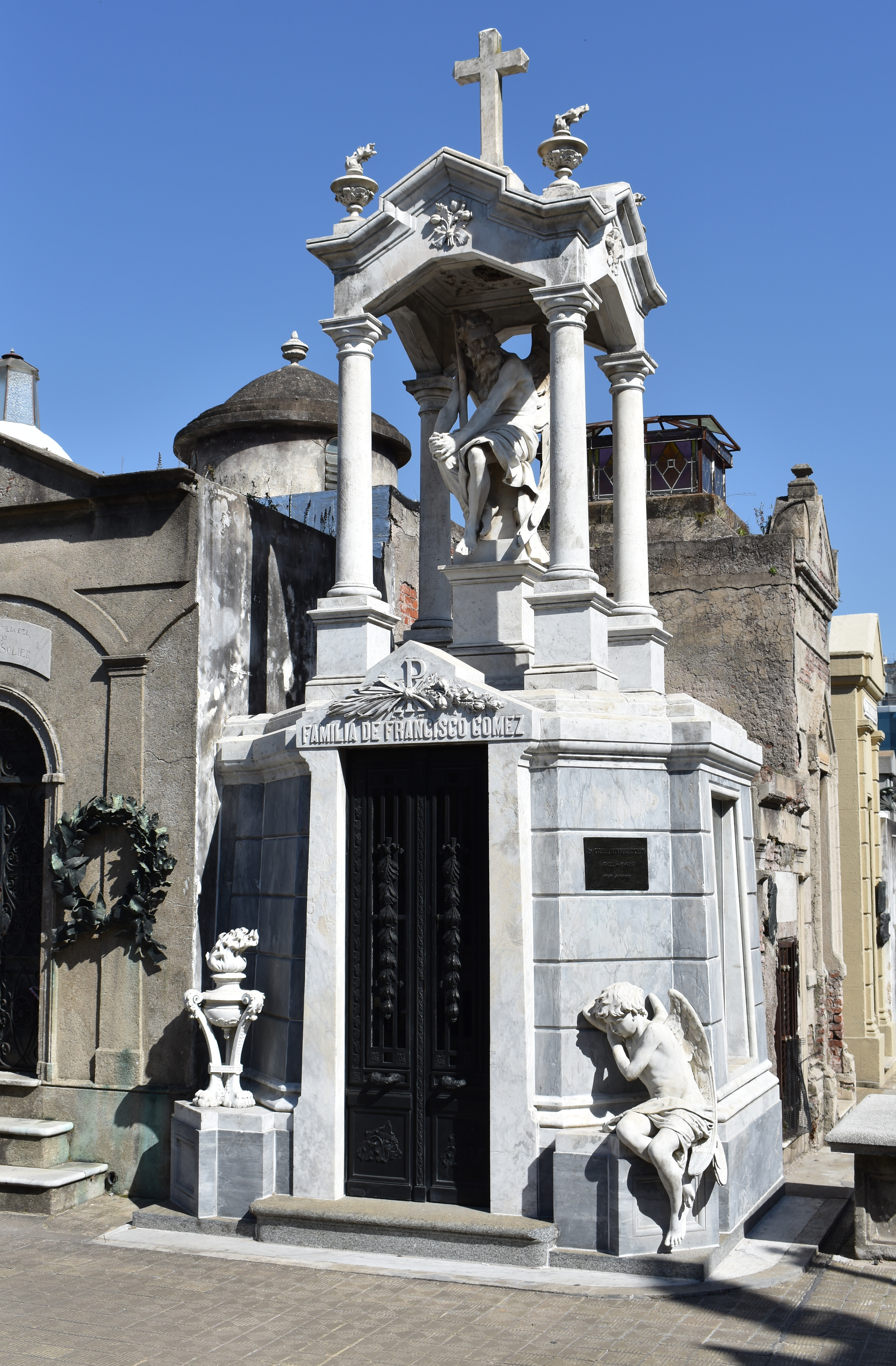
Tomb of Francisco Gómez

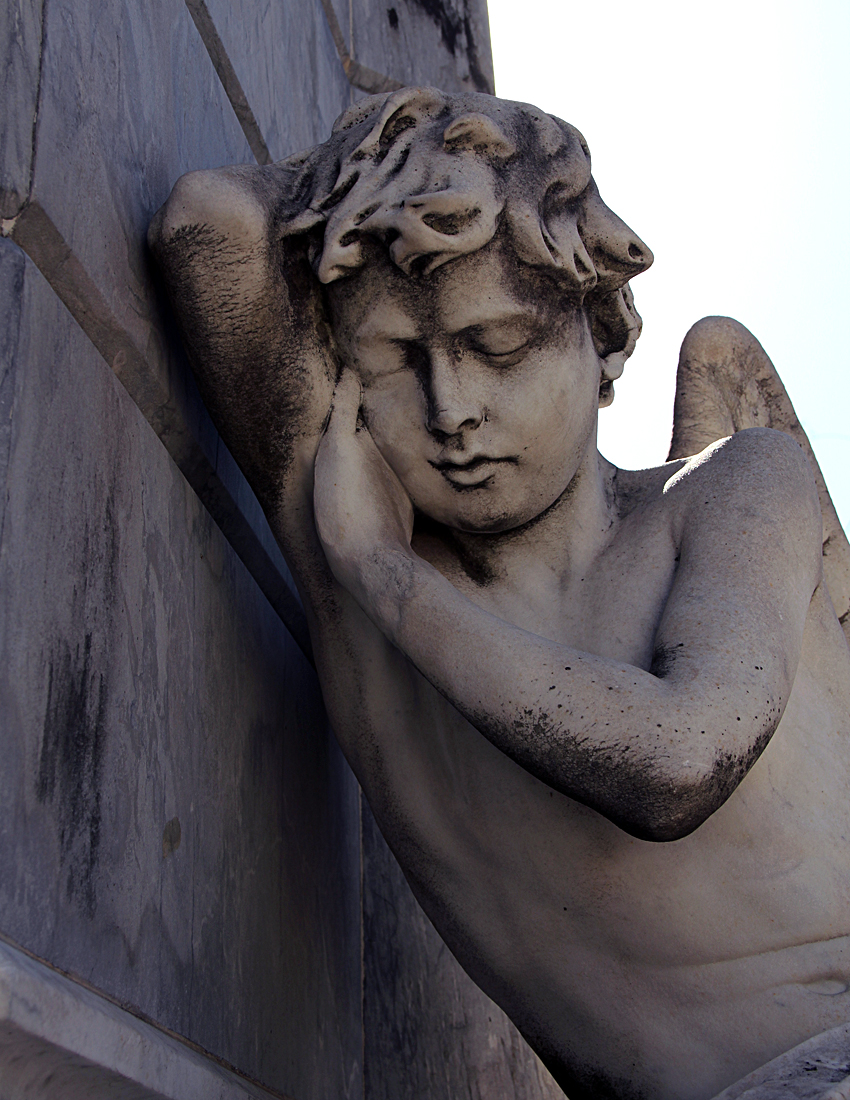
Boy angel statue

Birth	Death	Personality		Notes	Ref(s)
1914	1999		Adolfo Bioy Casares	Fiction writer, journalist, translator, and Miguel de Cervantes Prize recipient.	
1876	1943		Agustín Pedro Justo	President of Argentina.	
1921	2012		Amalia Lacroze de Fortabat	Businesswoman and philanthropist.	
1805	1871		Anthony Dominic Fahy	Catholic priest, missionary and head of the Irish community in Argentina (1844–1871)	
1914	1981		Armando Bó	Actor, film director, and screenwriter.	
1900	1983		Arturo Umberto Illia	President of Argentina.	
1821	1906		Bartolomé Mitre	President of Argentina.	
1840	1902		Cándido López	Soldier, painter, and student of Italian artist Baldassare Verazzi.	
1827	1918		Carlos Guido y Spano	Poet.	
1789	1852		Carlos María de Alvear	Soldier, statesman, and Supreme Director of the United Provinces of the Río de la Plata.	
1846	1906		Carlos Pellegrini	President of Argentina.	
1878	1959		Carlos Saavedra Lamas	Academic, politician, and the first Latin American Nobel Peace Prize recipient.	
1759	1829		Cornelio Saavedra	President of the First Assembly and military officer.	
1758	1820		Cosme Argerich	Military physician.	
1800	1875		Dalmacio Vélez Sársfield	Lawyer, politician, and writer of the Civil Code of Argentina.	
1811	1888		Domingo Faustino Sarmiento	President of Argentina.	
1896	1956		Eduardo Lonardi	President of Argentina.	
1903	1982		Eduardo Mallea	Essayist, cultural critic, writer, and diplomat.	
1844	1913		Eduardo Wilde	Physician, politician, and writer.	
1875	1951		Elpidio González	Politician and Vice President of Argentina.	
1919	1952		Eva Perón	First Lady of Argentina and founder of the Eva Perón Foundation.	
1788	1835		Facundo Quiroga	Caudillo and subject of the book Facundo, Domingo Faustino Sarmiento's most prominent work.	
1785	1827		Federico de Brandsen	French-born Colonel.	
1835	1899		Federico Lacroze	Businessman and railway entrepreneur.	
1795	1871		Francisco Javier Muñiz	Argentine physician, naturalist and politician	
1821	1890		Guillermo Rawson	Physician and politician.	
1852	1933		Hipólito Yrigoyen	President of Argentina.	
1847	1847	—	Isabelle Colonna-Walewski	Daughter of Count Alexandre Colonna-Walewski and grandchild of Napoleon.	
1842	1912		José Clemente Paz	Statesman, diplomat, and journalist.	
1860	1931		José Figueroa Alcorta	President of Argentina.	
1834	1886		José Hernández	Journalist, politician, poet, and creator of Argentina's national epic, the Martín Fierro.	
1910	1975		José María Guido	President of Argentina.	
1758	1833		Juan José Paso	Politician and member of the First Assembly, the First Triumvirate, and the Second Triumvirate.	
1797	1841		Juan Lavalle	General and Governor of Buenos Aires Province.	
1793	1877		Juan Manuel de Rosas	Brigadier and Governor of Buenos Aires Province. Initially buried at Southampton Old Cemetery in the United Kingdom, repatriated in 1989.	
1843	1914		Julio Argentino Roca	President of Argentina.	
1841	1896		Leandro Nicéforo Alem	Politician.	
1874	1938		Leopoldo Lugones	Writer and journalist.	
1831	1913		Lucio Victorio Mansilla	General, writer, journalist, politician, and diplomat.	
1894	1960		Luis Ángel Firpo	Professional boxer and the first Latin American to challenge for the world heavyweight champion title.	
1906	1987		Luis Federico Leloir	Biochemist, physician, and the first Spanish-speaking Nobel Prize in Chemistry laureate.	
1838	1907		Luis María Campos	General and founder of the Escuela Superior de Guerra (Superior School of War).	
1822	1907		Luis Sáenz Peña	President of Argentina.	
1791	1871		Luis Vernet	German-born merchant of Huguenot descent and the first Argentine appointed as Governor of Puerto Luis (nowadays the Falkland Islands).	
1787	1828		Manuel Dorrego	Military officer and Governor of Buenos Aires Province. Mausoleum designed by Carlo Zucchi.	
1835	1906		Manuel Quintana	President of Argentina.	
1868	1942		Marcelo Torcuato de Alvear	President of Argentina.	
1887	1970		Mariette Lydis	Austrian-born painter and illustrator.	
1786	1868		Mariquita Sánchez de Thompson	Patriot.	
1922	1991		Martín Karadagian	Actor, professional wrestler, and Wrestling Observer Newsletter Hall of Fame inductee.	
1851	1905		Miguel Cané	Writer, lawyer, academic, journalist, and politician.	
1754	1833		Miguel de Azcuénaga	General, politician, and member of the First Assembly.	
1783	1849		Miguel Estanislao Soler	General and politician.	
1837	1885		Nicolás Avellaneda	President of Argentina.	
1891	1967		Oliverio Girondo	Poet.	
1859	1936		Pablo Ricchieri	Military officer and Minister of War.	
1848	1929		Paul Groussac	French-born writer, literary critic, historian, and librarian.	
1903	1970		Pedro Eugenio Aramburu	President of Argentina.	
1927	2009		Raúl Alfonsín	President of Argentina.	
1926	2016		María Lorenza Barreneche	First Lady of Argentina. Widow of Raúl Alfonsín.	
1797	1823		Remedios de Escalada	Wife of libertador José de San Martín.	
1851	1914		Roque Sáenz Peña	President of Argentina.	
1903	1993		Silvina Ocampo	Poet, translator, and writer.	
1802	1869		Valentín Alsina	Governor of Buenos Aires Province.	
1785	1856		Vicente López y Planes	Poet, politician, and creator of the lyrics of the Argentine National Anthem.	
1890	1979		Victoria Ocampo	Writer, intellectual, and the first woman admitted to the Argentine Academy of Letters.	
1840	1919		Victorino de la Plaza	President of Argentina.	
1883	1902		Rufina Cambaceres	Possible example of premature burial.	
1777	1857		William Brown	Irish-born Admiral and founder of the Argentine Navy.	
1856	1902		Zenón Rolón	Musician and composer.	
1920	1999		Zully Moreno	Actress.	
