= Pablo Riccheri =

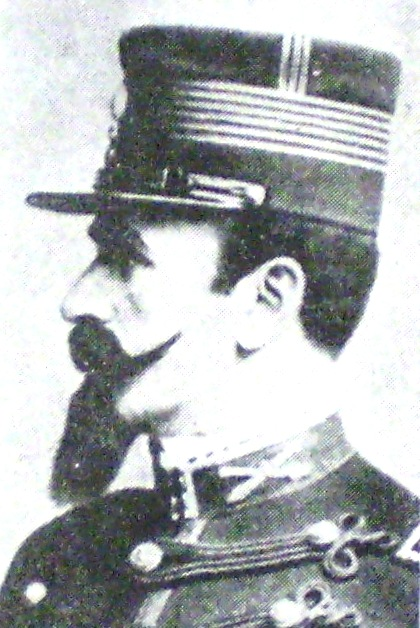

Minister of War
- In office July 13, 1900 – October 12, 1904
- President: Julio Roca
- Preceded by: Rosendo Fraga
- Succeeded by: Enrique Godoy

Personal details
- Born: August 8, 1859 San Lorenzo, Santa Fe
- Died: July 29, 1936 (aged 76) Buenos Aires
- Spouse: Dolores Murature

Pablo Riccheri (August 8, 1859 – July 29, 1936) was an Argentine army officer and minister of war during the second administration of president Julio Roca.

== Life and times ==
Riccheri was born in San Lorenzo, Santa Fe to Catalina Ciufardi and Lazzaro Riccheri, both Italian immigrants from the Region of Liguria. He enrolled at the National War College on a scholarship, and graduated with honors in 1879 as a second lieutenant. He subsequently completed higher studies at the Royal Military Academy of Belgium, in Brussels. where he presented a thesis on the defense of Belgium and earned an officer's degree in 1883.

Riccheri was promoted to captain and returned to Argentina in 1886. The following year, he was transferred to the Argentine Embassy in Berlin as a military attaché. He was named director of the European bureau of the Argentine Armaments Commission in 1890 and of the Technical Commission on Armaments in 1895, in which capacity he purchased a large shipment of new Mauser rifles and cannons for 18 artillery batteries, and had a 400 kilometres (250 mi) rail line to Neuquén built for the Argentine Army. He was named colonel, and in 1898 returned to Argentina as Director General of the National War Arsenal.

Riccheri married Dolores Murature in 1901; she was the granddaughter of Commodore José Félix Murature, a hero of the Cisplatine War of the 1820s. Their family life was marked by tragedy, however. Their first daughter died within hours of birth and a second daughter at age 11, as a result of which Mrs. Riccheri developed clinical depression.

President Julio Roca subsequently appointed Riccheri Army Chief of Staff, and on July 13, 1900, citing his "intelligent furor and single-minded dedication to our military procurement needs," President Roca named him the nation's War Minister. His tenure was marked by ongoing efforts to modernize the Argentine Armed Forces amid tensions in Argentina-Chile relations resulting from the Beagle and Puna de Atacama disputes. Riccheri reorganized the War Department; restored the Regiment of Mounted Grenadiers (protagonists during the Argentine War of Independence and the Cisplatine War, though inactive since 1826); streamlined the National War College and other instructional institutions, enacting standardized testing; commissioned the establishment of Army bases of Campo de Mayo (Greater Buenos Aires), General Paz (Córdoba), Campo de los Andes (Mendoza), Paracao (Paraná), and General Belgrano (Salta); and divided the Army into twenty (later, seven) geographic regions. He also advanced the landmark Law 4.301 (the Ricchieri Act) of 1901, which mandated compulsory military service for a minimum of one year for able-bodied Argentine men at age 18; conscription (colloquially known in Argentina as la colimba) would remain in force until 1995.

Riccheri supported proposed military action against neighboring Chile over ongoing border disputes. War, however, was averted by the May Pacts and the Treaty of Arbitration, both signed in 1902. He was promoted to the rank of brigadier general in 1904 and retired from his post as War Minister upon the end of President Roca's term in October. He served briefly as Director of the National War College between October 1904 and January 1905.

He again served as Army Chief of Staff and was promoted to the rank of major general in 1910. Riccheri believed the military should remain a disinterested party in Argentine politics. He nevertheless lent his support in 1909 to UCR leader Hipólito Yrigoyen's call for universal male suffrage and the secret ballot (reforms opposed by the ruling National Autonomist Party). These reforms were ultimately enacted with the Sáenz Peña Law of 1912.

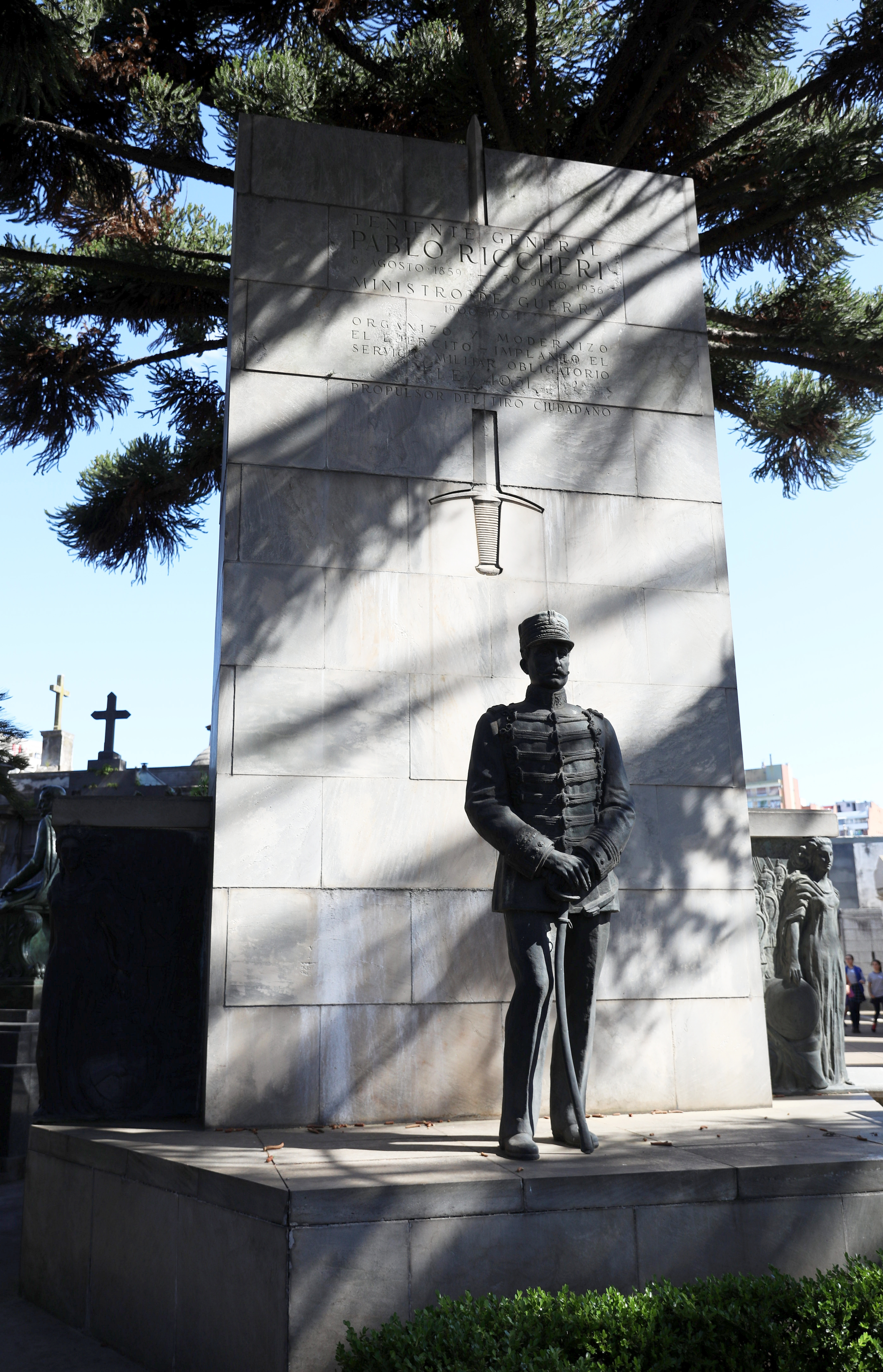
A monument to General Riccheri by Luis Perlotti guards his Recoleta Cemetery crypt

Riccheri and explorer Francisco Moreno co-founded the Argentine Boy Scouts Association on July 4, 1912; he served as its first secretary, during Moreno's tenure as President of Scouts de Argentina, and succeeded Moreno as its president upon the latter's death in 1919. Ricchieri was commissioned in 1916 to prepare a situational appraisal of World War I for the Argentine Government, which at that point considered enlisting troops to the aid of the Triple Entente allies. He retired in 1922 as a lieutenant general.

Twelve years later, in recognition of his distinguished military service, he was promoted to Army General by President Agustín Justo. Riccheri was also honored abroad, receiving the Order of the Red Eagle (Germany), merit badges from Chile and France, and an appointment as Grand Officer of the Order of the Crown.

He died in Buenos Aires in 1936 and was buried with the highest military honors in La Recoleta Cemetery.

National Route A002, which links Buenos Aires to the Ministro Pistarini International Airport, was named in his honor in 1952.
