= Rufina Cambaceres =

Argentine heiress and burying alive victim (1883-1902)

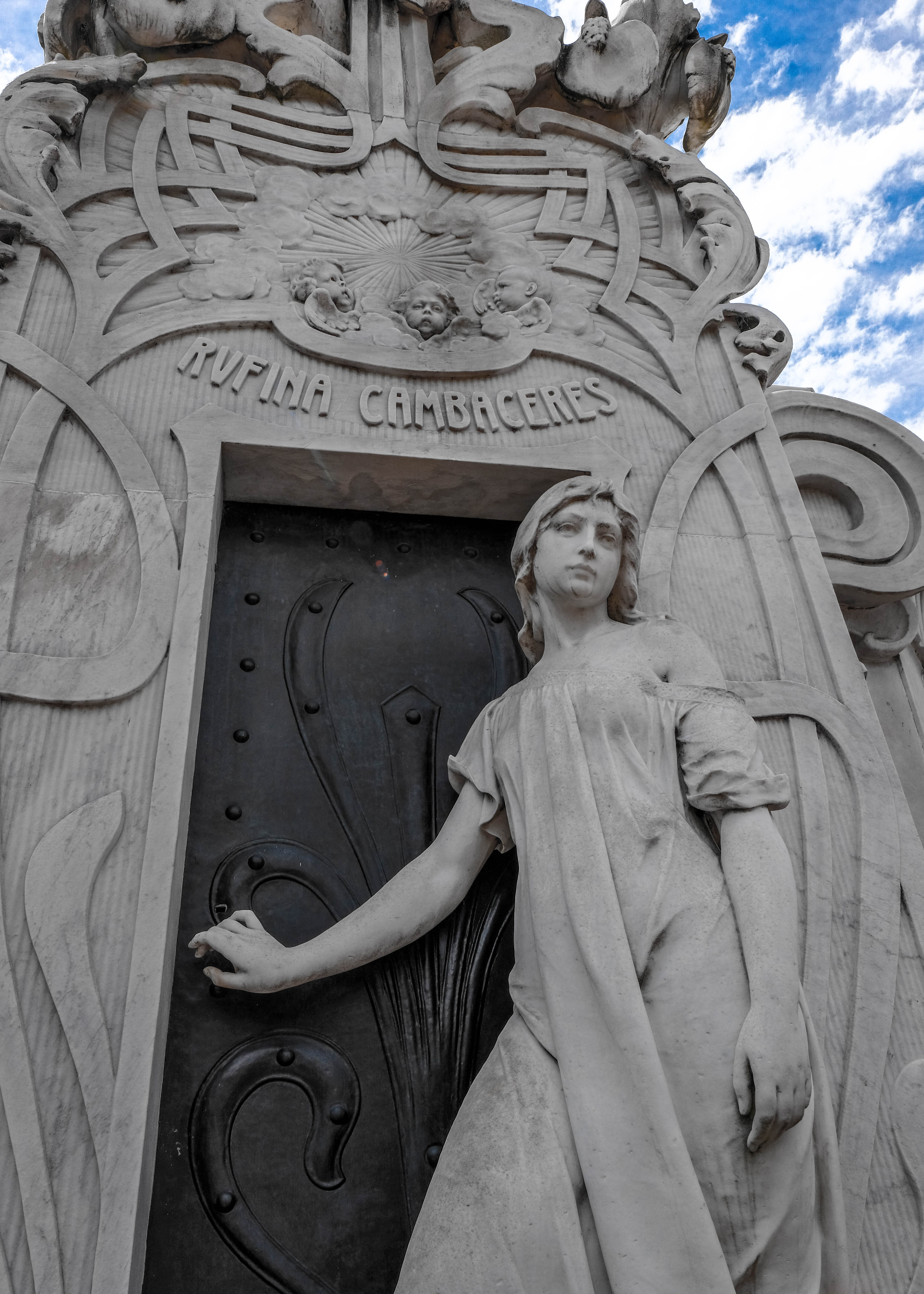
The tomb of Rufina Cambaceres in La Recoleta Cemetery, Buenos Aires

Rufina Cambaceres (also spelled Cambacérès) (31 May 1883 – 31 May 1902) was the sole heiress to a large fortune derived from cattle ranching in Argentina. In 1902, at the age of 19, she was found apparently lifeless, and buried in the family vault in Buenos Aires. After her interment, noises were heard from the tomb, and she was subsequently discovered to have been buried alive. Since her premature burial, she is popularly known as "the girl who died twice"; her tomb is one of the most famous in La Recoleta Cemetery.

== Life and death ==
Rufina Cambaceres was born in Paris, into a wealthy family. Her father was the Argentine writer and politician Eugenio Cambaceres and her mother was the Italian dancer Luisa Bacichi, who married in Paris in 1887. Her father died of tuberculosis when she was four years old. Rufina received a good education, excelling in her studies and speaking five languages. She grew up to be a Buenos Aires socialite.

On the evening of her nineteenth birthday, while changing for the opera, Rufina collapsed and was found on the floor of her boudoir with no vital signs. Three doctors declared her dead due to a stroke or heart attack.

She was buried by her mother the next day, wearing her favourite jewels, in the family mausoleum in La Recoleta cemetery. The same night, the caretaker heard deep, loud noises coming from her vault. Fearing that thieves were ransacking the body, he went to the vault and found that the coffin had moved and the lid was broken in places. Upon closer inspection, he found scratch marks on the inside of the lid and on the young woman's face, indicating Rufina had been buried alive.

== Possible reasons for Rufina's collapse and death ==
Rufina's original collapse is generally attributed to catalepsy, the reason for which has never been fully clarified.

It is presumed that, after her premature burial, she died of exhaustion or shock after waking up in a coffin. However, in a possible case of urban legend, it has also been claimed that her body was found next to the door, and that she had managed to get out of her coffin and, upon realising she was trapped in a mausoleum in the middle of the night, she suffered a heart attack.

The incident changed funerary practices in Buenos Aires, and afterwards bell chimes were installed in coffins, in case the dead woke up.

== La Recoleta tomb ==
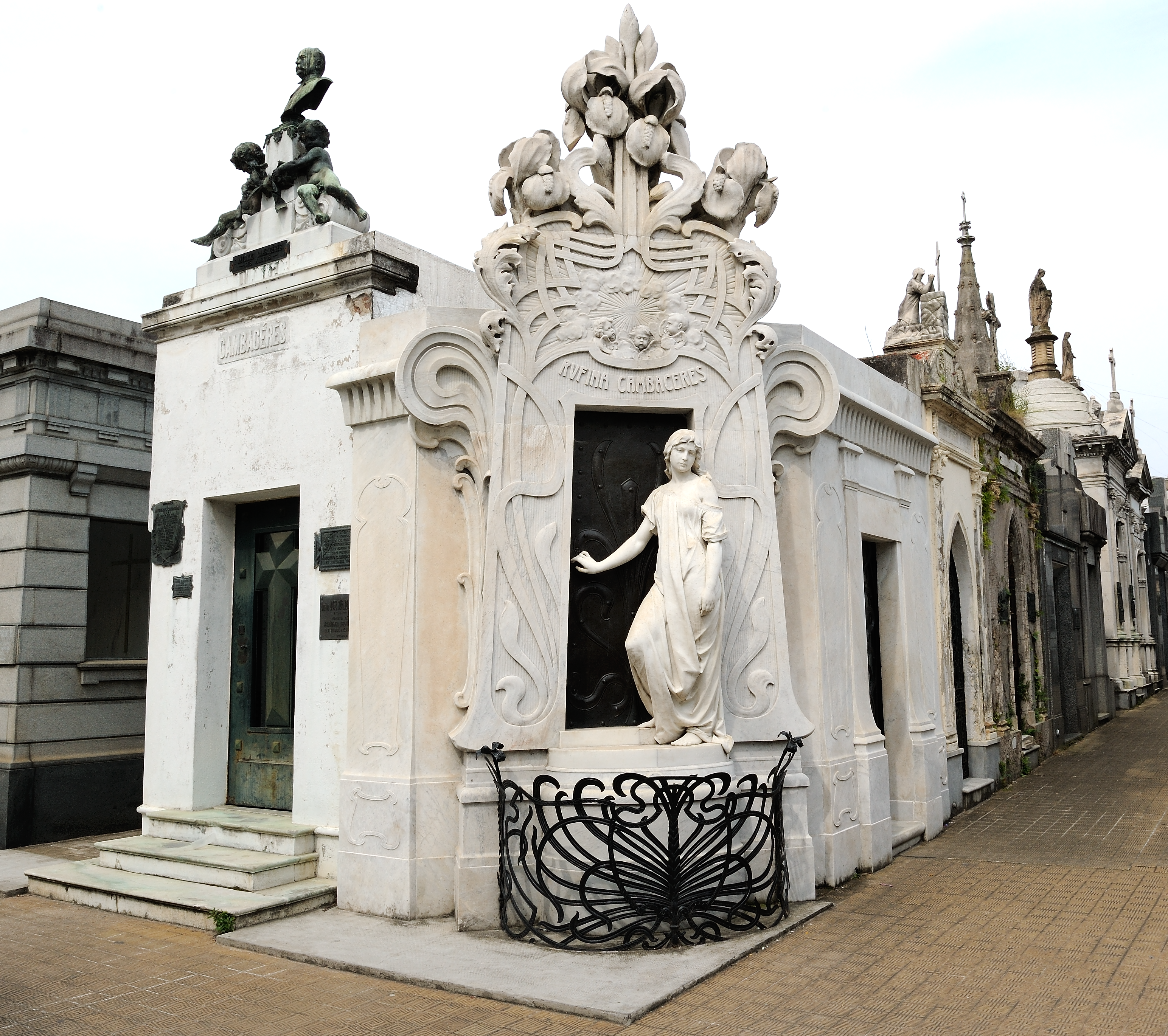
The tomb of Rufina Cambaceres

Rufina's tomb is an Art Nouveau masterpiece, constructed of Carrara marble, featuring a full-sized statue of her holding the door to her own mausoleum, possibly leaving it. It is said to have been built by her mother as a tribute to what happened to her. On the top is a carved rose, and next to it a carved bed for her mother to sleep in to keep her company. It is one of the most visited tombs in the cemetery.

Another urban legend is that her ghost haunts the cemetery.

== In popular culture ==
- In 2006, a documentary was filmed based on the story of Rufina Cambaceres: No hay más sombras: Rufina Cambaceres. The film explores the meaning of urban myths, legends, funeral rites and popular imagination. It stars Eugenia Rosales in the role of Rufina and was directed and written by Pablo Tesoriere, with poems by Gonzalo Silva.
- The Chilean amateur composer Luis Lastra Cid composed a song dedicated to Rufina Cambaceres called "Rufina" on his album Book of Shadows.
- In 2012, the Uruguayan programme es:Voces anunciadas aired an episode that tells of her tragic death.
- The song "1902" by metal band Keyscore is based on Rufina's story.
