= Tomb of Liliana Crociati de Szaszak =

Tomb in Buenos Aires, Argentina

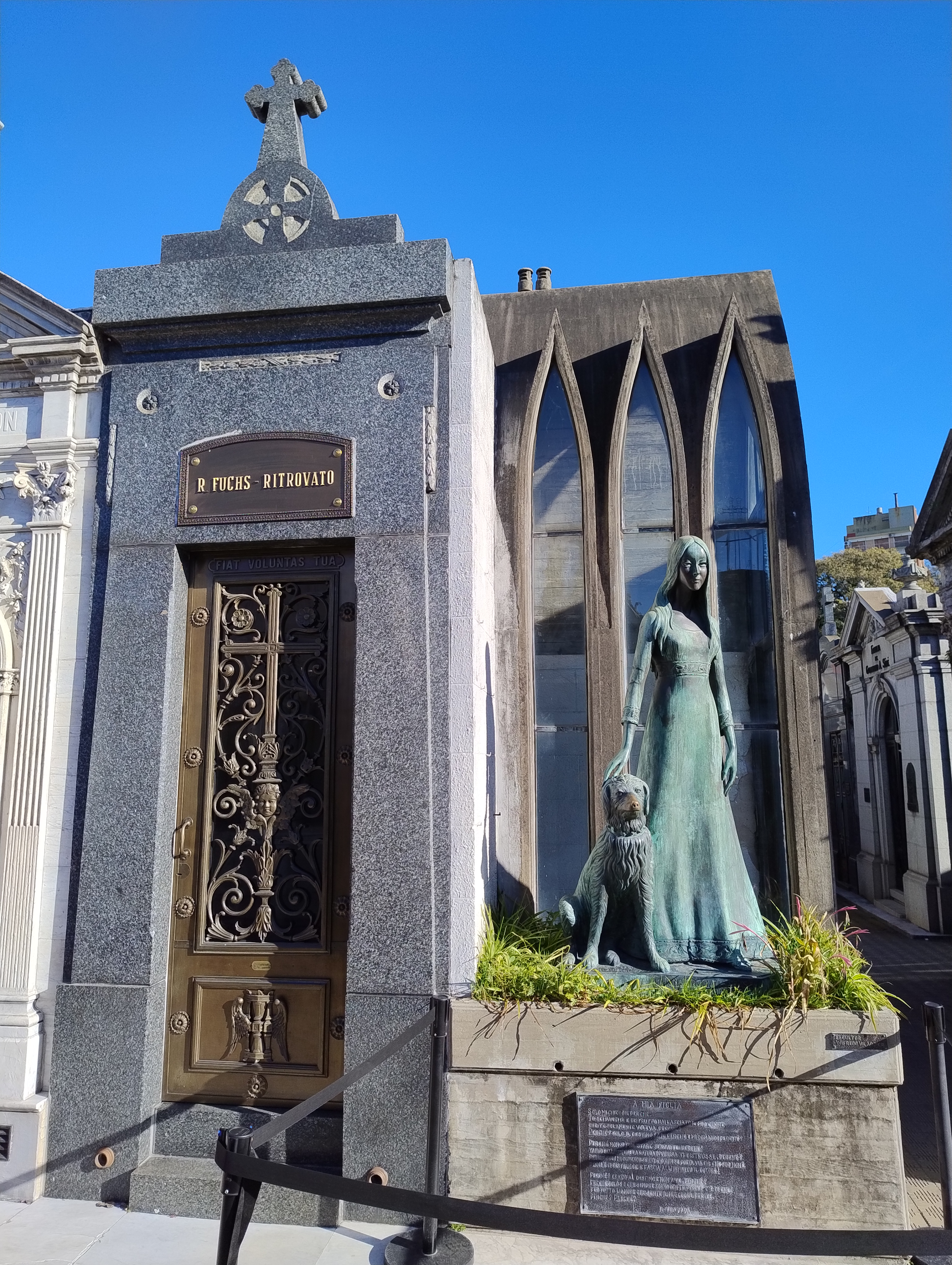
Tomb of Liliana Crociati de Szaszak (right)

The tomb of Liliana Crociati de Szaszak is a tomb in La Recoleta Cemetery, Buenos Aires, Argentina, known for its unusual design.

26-year-old Liliana Crociati de Szaszak (1944–1970) was in Innsbruck, Austria on 26 February 1970, when her hotel was struck by an avalanche, killing her. Her tomb was designed by her mother in the Neo-Gothic style, in sharp contrast to the other tombs in the cemetery. Adjacent to the tomb stands a dais adorned with a plaque containing an Italian-language poem by her father, and topped by a life-size green bronze statue of Crociati de Szaszak in her wedding dress, by sculptor Wíeredovol Viladrich. Following the death of Crociati's dog Sabú, a bronze statue of the dog, also by Viladrich, was added, with Crociati's hand resting on the dog's head.

== "A Mia Figlia", poem on the dais adjacent to the tomb ==
A Mia Figlia

Solo mi chiedo il perché
Tu se partita e distrutto hai lasciato il mio cuore
Che te solamente voleva, perché?
Perché? Solo il destino sà il perché e mi domando perché?

Perché non si può stare senza te, perché?
Tanto bella eri che la natura invidiosa ti distrusse, perché?
Perché, solo mi domando se Dio c'é, con se porta via ciò che suo non è
Perché ci distrugge e lascia all'infinito il dolore!

Perché? Credo al destino e non a te, perché?
Perché solo sò che sempre sogno con te, perché c'é di che?
Per tutto l'amore che sente il mio cuore per te.
Perché? Perché?

Il tuo papá

Translation:

To my Daughter

Only I ask myself why
You left and left my heart destroyed
That wanted only you, why?
Why? Only destiny knows the reason, and I ask myself why?

Because we can’t be without you, why?
You were so beautiful that invidious nature destroyed you. Why?
I only ask myself why, if God exists, does he take away that which is not His.
Because He destroys us and leaves us to an eternity of sadness!

Why? I believe in fate and not in you. Why?
Because I only know that I always dream with you, why is that?
For all the love my heart feels for you.
Why? Why?

Your Papá
