= Eugenio Cambaceres =

Argentine writer and politician (1843–1889)

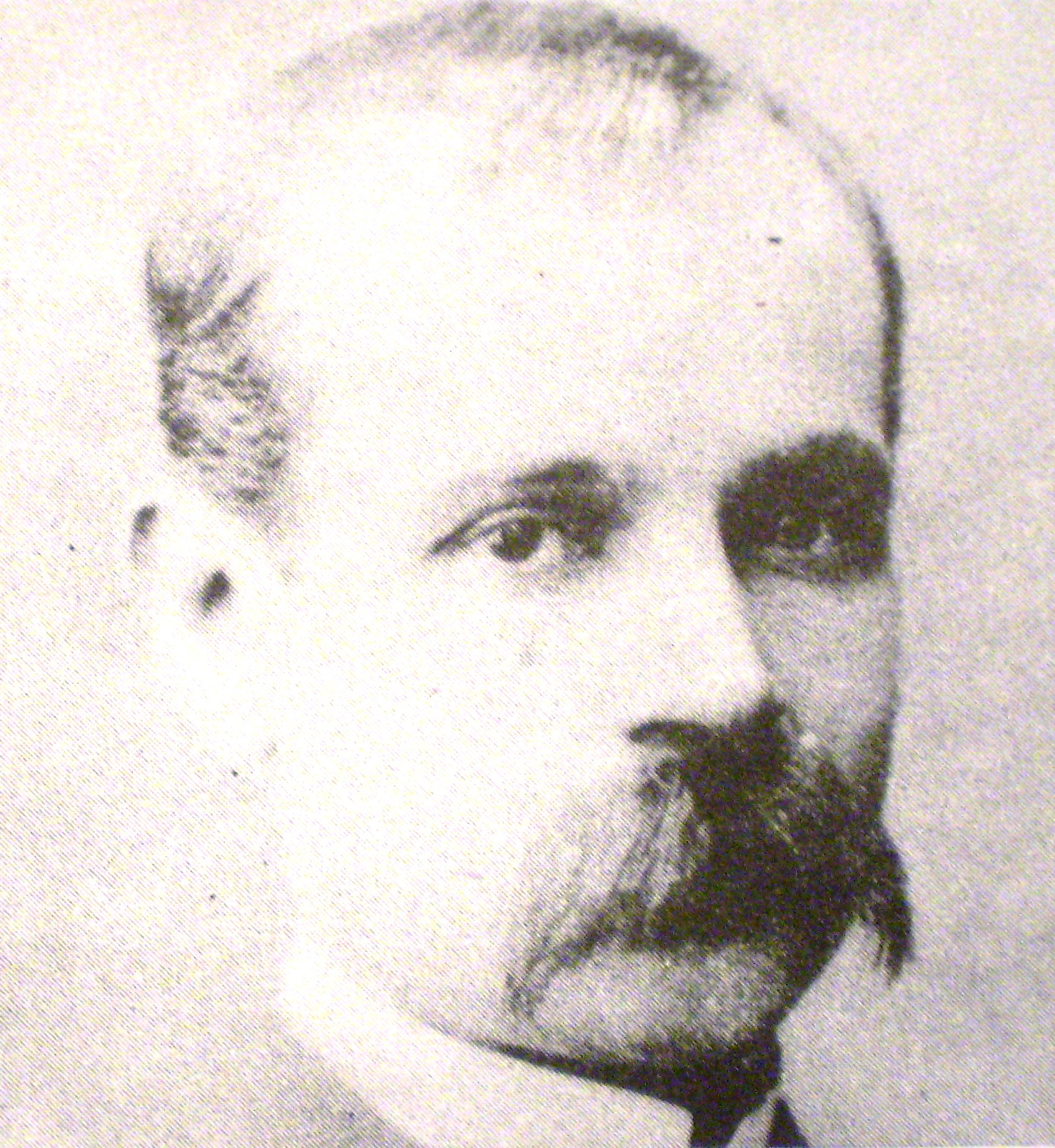
Eugenio Cambaceres.

Eugenio Cambaceres (24 February 1843 – 14 June 1889) was an Argentine writer and politician. In the 1880s he wrote four books, with Sin rumbo (1885) being his masterpiece. His promising literary career was cut short when he died of tuberculosis.

== Biography ==
Cambaceres was born and died in Buenos Aires. He was the son of a French chemist father who immigrated to Argentina in 1833 and a mother native to Buenos Aires. Cambaceres went to secondary school at the Colegio Nacional Central and then went on to receive a law degree from the Universidad de Buenos Aires.

Quickly launching into politics, he was elected to the Argentine Chamber of Deputies and was named secretary of the Club del Progreso in 1870, and in 1873 became Vice President of said organization. However, his denunciations of fraud within his own party led to his downfall, and although he was re-elected to the legislature in 1876 he soon resigned his post and left public life to devote himself to literature. From his career as a liberal politician, perhaps his most important contribution was a controversial tract in a local magazine advocating the separation of Church and State that was quite polemic at the time.

As a writer, he combined the naturalism of Émile Zola and the Goncourt brothers and a localized realist character with four novels of a pessimistic nature. His first two novels were Pot-pourri (1881) and Música sentimental: Silbidos de un vago [Sentimental Music: Whistles of a Lazy Man] (1884). Both lack a precise plot and leave many threads hanging, containing stories of adultery within a pessimistic and weary atmosphere. The novelty of dealing with such a lurid topic and in such a crude manner provoked a scandalous repercussion and critics did not hesitate in directly attacking Cambaceres. This changed the composition and style of his later works, which were much better received.

In 1885 he released his most significant novel, Sin Rumbo [Without Direction], where he offered good descriptions of the landscape of sexual pathology, including interesting anecdotes. The year before he died 1887, he published En la sangre (In the Blood), a story about the son of Italian immigrants of humble origin that advances his social standing by marrying the daughter of a wealthy estate, only to squander his fortune and end up with a miserable life. Through his writing, Cambaceres dealt with the problems associated with the arrival of Immigrants to Argentina and the social changes of his time, but ended up taking the perspective of the high bourgeoisie that critiqued the lower classes and European immigration.

Eugenio Cambaceres traveled to Europe and was in Paris when he died at 45 years of age, in 1889. His daughter, Rufina Cambaceres, was only four years old.

== See also ==
- Argentine literature
