= Ministry of Defense (Argentina) =

Government ministry of Argentina

- Ministerio de Defensa
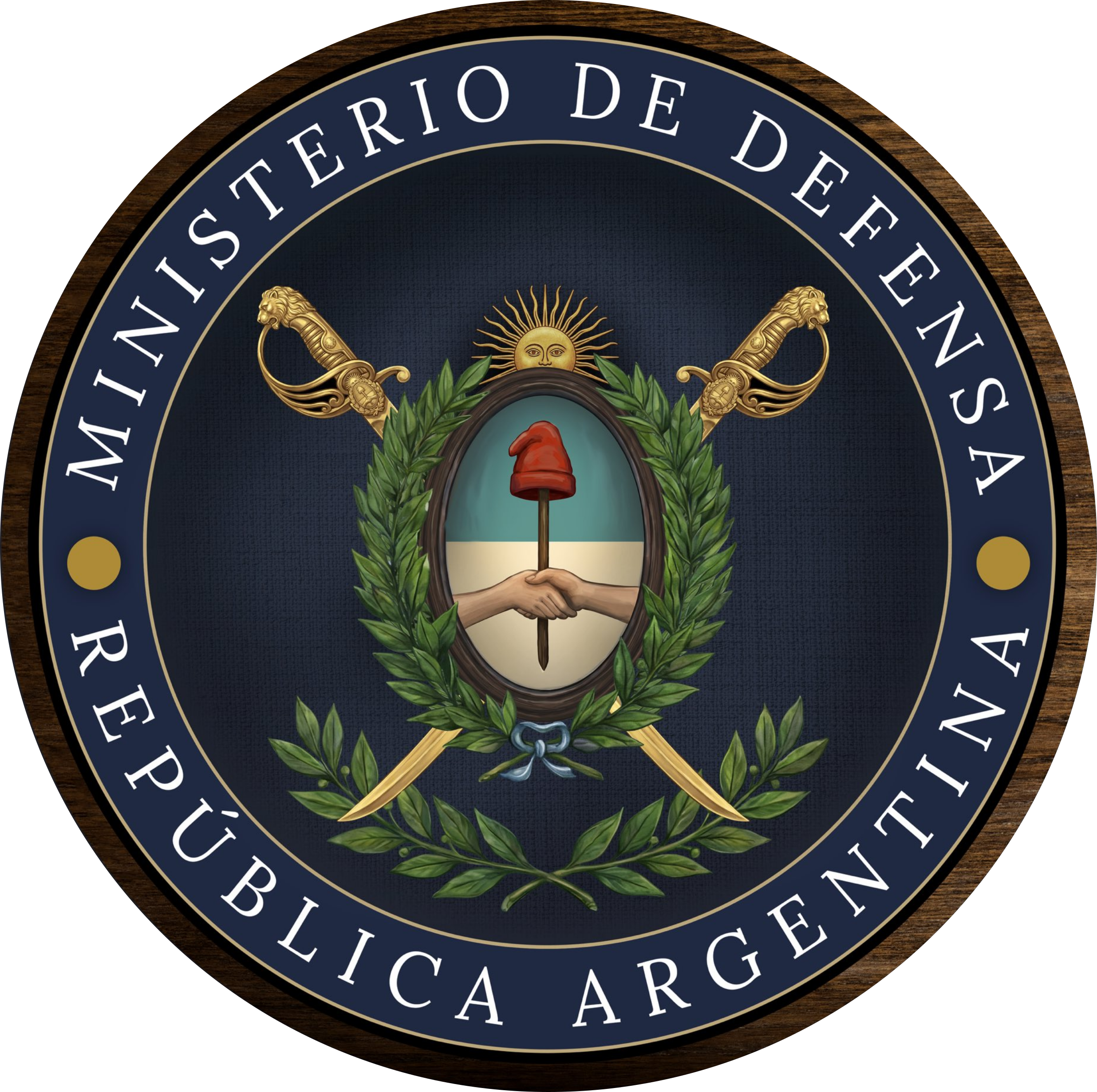

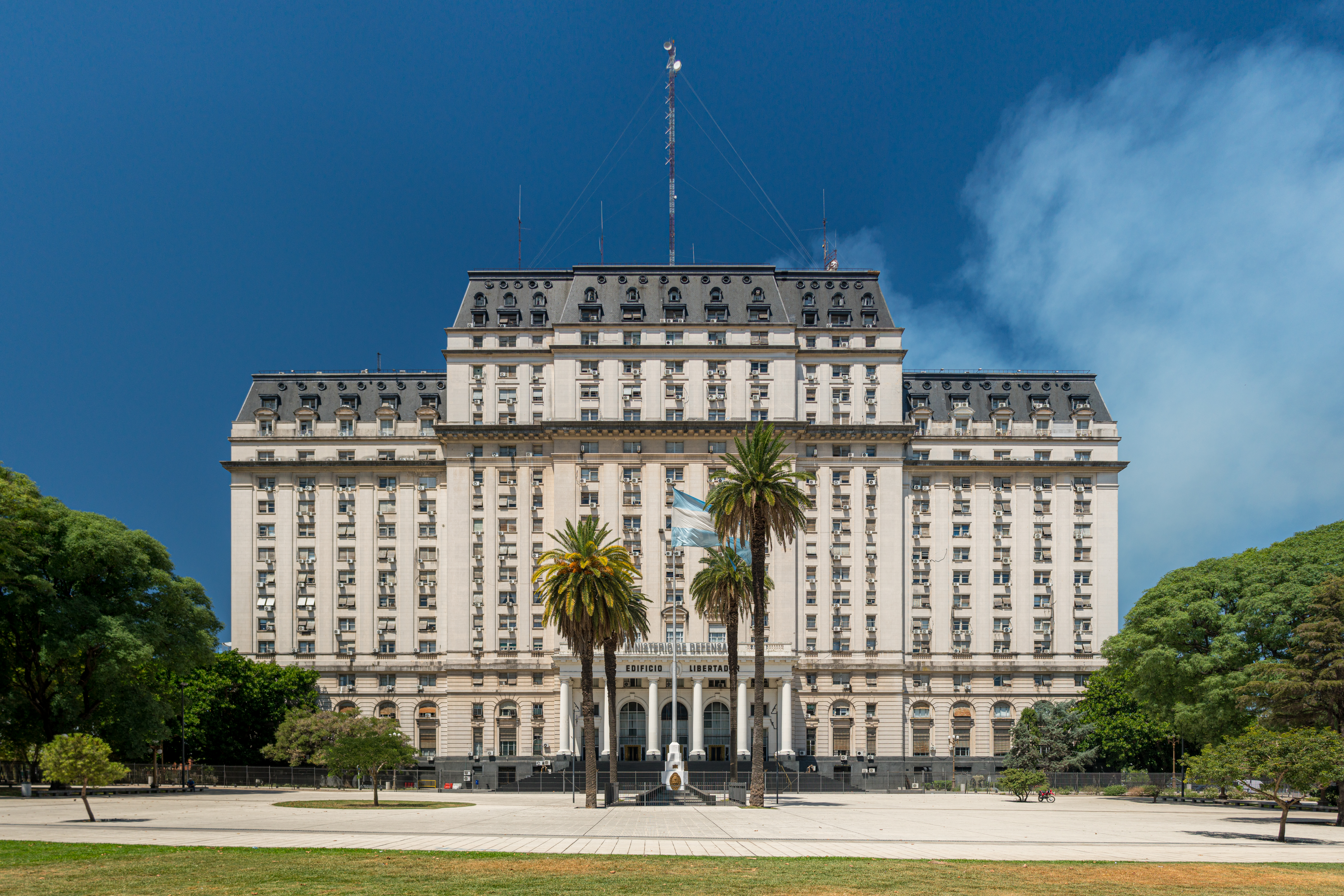
- Libertador Building, headquarters

Ministry overview
- Formed: 1854; 172 years ago
- Preceding Ministry: Ministry of War (Argentine Confederation; first creation)
- Jurisdiction: Government of Argentina
- Headquarters: Libertador Building, Buenos Aires
- Annual budget: $ 1,277,651,274,000 (2024) (USD 1.5 billion)
- Minister responsible: Carlos Presti
- Child agencies: CITEDEF; National Directorate of Strategic Military Intelligence; SMN
- Website: argentina.gob.ar/defensa

The Ministry of Defense (Spanish: Ministerio de Defensa; abbrevriated MINDEF) of Argentina is a ministry of the national executive power that oversees and advises on matters of national defense, including overseeing the Argentine Armed Forces.

The Ministry of Defense is one of the oldest ministries in the Argentine government, having existed continuously since the formation of the first Argentine executive in 1854, in the presidency of Justo José de Urquiza (then known as the Ministry of War). The incumbent minister since 10 December 2025 is Lieutenant General Carlos Presti, who had until then served as chief of the general staff of the Army and was appointed by president Javier Milei, becoming the first defense minister to come from a military background since the end of military rule in the country in 1983.

== History ==
Traditionally the minister of Defense, as the Joint chiefs of Staff (Spanish: Estado Mayor Conjunto) which traces back its origin to 1948 had a minor role in all armed forces activities, relegating key decisions to the respectives chiefs of staff.

A major change came into effect on 12 June 2006 when President Néstor Kirchner brought into effect the Defense Law, which had been passed in 1988 as a means to modernize the doctrine of the armed forces and define their role, although successive governments had failed to put it into effect.

The law states that the armed forces will only be used against foreign aggression, and reduces the powers of the heads of the armed services, centralizing whole operational and acquisitions decisions under the authority of the minister of Defense through the Armed Forces Joint General Staff emphasizing Jointness

== Structure ==
- Estado Mayor Conjunto de las Fuerzas Armadas (EMC): Joint Chiefs of Staff of the Armed Forces
- Secretaría de Estrategia y Asuntos Militares: Strategy and Military Affairs Secretary
- Secretaría de Planeamiento: Planning Secretary
- Secretaría de Asuntos Internacionales de la Defensa: Defense Foreign Affairs Secretary
- Dirección Nacional de Inteligencia Estratégica Militar: National Directory for Military Intelligence
- Dirección Nacional de Derechos Humanos y el Derecho Internacional Humanitario: National Directory for Human Rights
- CITEDEF (former CITEFA)
- Industrial Complex: (FadeA, Fabricaciones Militares, Tandanor/Domecq Garcia)

== List of ministers ==
No.	Minister	Party	Term	President
Ministry of War and the Navy (1854–1898)
1	Rudecindo Alvarado	Unitarian Party	5 March 1854 – 7 November 1854	Justo José de Urquiza
2	José Miguel Galán	Federalist Party	7 November 1854 – 5 March 1860	Justo José de Urquiza
3	Benjamín Victorica	Federalist Party	5 March 1860 – 5 November 1861	Santiago Derqui
4	Pastor Obligado	Nationalist Party	December 1851 – 12 October 1862	Bartolomé Mitre
5	Juan Andrés Gelly y Obes	Nationalist Party	12 October 1862 – November 1867	Bartolomé Mitre
6	Wenceslao Paunero	Nationalist Party	1 February 1868 – 12 October 1868	Bartolomé Mitre
7	Martín de Gainza	Nationalist Party	12 October 1868 – 12 October 1874	Domingo Faustino Sarmiento
8	Adolfo Alsina	National Autonomist Party	12 October 1874 – 29 December 1877	Nicolás Avellaneda
9	Julio Argentino Roca	National Autonomist Party	4 January 1878 – 9 October 1879	Nicolás Avellaneda
10	Carlos Pellegrini	National Autonomist Party	9 October 1879 – 12 October 1880	Nicolás Avellaneda
11	Benjamín Victorica	National Autonomist Party	12 October 1880 – 11 July 1885	Julio Argentino Roca
12	Carlos Pellegrini	National Autonomist Party	11 July 1885 – 12 October 1886	Julio Argentino Roca
13	Nicolás Levalle	Independent (Military)	12 October 1886 – 15 January 1887	Miguel Juárez Celman
14	Eduardo Racedo	National Autonomist Party	15 January 1887 – 12 April 1890	Miguel Juárez Celman
15	Nicolás Levalle	Independent (Military)	18 April 1890 – 6 August 1890	Miguel Juárez Celman
15	Nicolás Levalle	Independent (Military)	6 August 1890 – 12 October 1892	Carlos Pellegrini
16	Benjamín Victorica	National Autonomist Party	12 October 1892 – 7 June 1893	Luis Sáenz Peña
17	Joaquín Viejobueno	Independent (Military)	7 June 1893 – 27 June 1893	Luis Sáenz Peña
18	Eudoro Balsa	National Autonomist Party	27 June 1893 – 5 July 1893	Luis Sáenz Peña
19	Aristóbulo del Valle	Radical Civic Union	5 July 1893 – 12 August 1893	Luis Sáenz Peña
20	Luis María Campos	Independent (Military)	12 August 1893 – 7 November 1894	Luis Sáenz Peña
21	Eudoro Balsa	National Autonomist Party	7 November 1894 – 23 January 1895	Luis Sáenz Peña
21	Eudoro Balsa	National Autonomist Party	23 January 1895 – 29 August 1895	José Evaristo Uriburu
22	Guillermo Villanueva	Independent	29 August 1895 – 19 May 1897	José Evaristo Uriburu
23	Nicolás Levalle	Independent (Military)	19 May 1897 – 12 October 1898	José Evaristo Uriburu
Ministry of War (1898–1949)
24	Luis María Campos	Independent (Military)	12 October 1898 – 8 August 1899	Julio Argentino Roca
25	Rosendo Fraga	National Autonomist Party	8 August 1899 – 13 July 1900	Julio Argentino Roca
26	Pablo Ricchieri	Independent (Military)	13 July 1900 – 12 October 1904	Julio Argentino Roca
27	Enrique Godoy	National Autonomist Party	12 October 1904 – 12 March 1906	Manuel Quintana
28	Luis María Campos	Independent (Military)	14 March 1906 – 5 July 1906	José Figueroa Alcorta
29	Rosendo Fraga	National Autonomist Party	5 July 1906 – 11 July 1907	José Figueroa Alcorta
30	Rafael María Aguirre	Independent (Military)	11 July 1907 – 2 March 1910	José Figueroa Alcorta
31	Eduardo Racedo	National Autonomist Party	2 March 1910 – 12 October 1910	José Figueroa Alcorta
32	Gregorio Vélez	Independent (Military)	12 October 1910 – 12 February 1914	Roque Sáenz Peña
33	Ángel Allaria	Independent (Military)	16 February 1914 – 9 August 1914	Roque Sáenz Peña
33	Ángel Allaria	Independent (Military)	9 August 1914 – 12 October 1916	Victorino de la Plaza
34	Elpidio González	Radical Civic Union	12 October 1916 – 14 September 1918	Hipólito Yrigoyen
35	Julio Moreno	Radical Civic Union	14 September 1918 – 12 October 1922	Hipólito Yrigoyen
36	Agustín Pedro Justo	Radical Civic Union	12 October 1922 – 12 October 1928	Marcelo T. de Alvear
37	Luis Dellepiane	Radical Civic Union	12 October 1928 – 6 September 1930	Hipólito Yrigoyen
38	Francisco Medina	Independent (Military)	6 September 1930 – 20 February 1932	José Félix Uriburu
39	Manuel A. Rodríguez	Independent (Military)	20 February 1932 – 24 February 1936	Agustín Pedro Justo
40	Basilio Pertiné	Independent (Military)	30 March 1936 – 20 February 1938	Agustín Pedro Justo
41	Carlos Márquez	Independent (Military)	20 February 1938 – 27 June 1942	Roberto M. Ortiz
42	Juan Nerón Tonazzi	Independent (Military)	27 June 1942 – 16 November 1942	Ramón S. Castillo
43	Pedro Pablo Ramírez	Independent (Military)	16 November 1942 – 4 June 1943	Ramón S. Castillo
44	Edelmiro Farrell	Independent (Military)	7 June 1943 – 24 February 1944	Pedro Pablo Ramírez
45	Juan Domingo Perón	Independent (Military)	24 February 1944 – 9 March 1944	Pedro Pablo Ramírez
45	Juan Domingo Perón	Independent (Military)	9 March 1944 – 8 October 1945	Edelmiro Farrell
46	Eduardo Ávalos	Independent (Military)	8 October 1945 – 17 October 1945	Edelmiro Farrell
47	Humberto Sosa Molina	Independent (Military)	18 October 1945 – 4 June 1946	Edelmiro Farrell
47	Humberto Sosa Molina	Independent (Military)	4 June 1946 – 11 March 1949	Juan Domingo Perón
Ministry of Defense (1949–1955)
47	Humberto Sosa Molina	Independent (Military)	11 March 1949 – 21 September 1955	Juan Domingo Perón
Ministry of War (1955–1958)
48	Héctor Solanas Pacheco	Independent (Military)	1 May 1958 – 18 June 1958	Arturo Frondizi
Ministry of National Defense (1958–1981)
49	Gabriel del Mazo	Radical Civic Union	18 June 1958 – 24 June 1959	Arturo Frondizi
50	Justo Policarpo Villar	Radical Civic Union	25 June 1959 – 26 March 1962	Arturo Frondizi
51	Rodolfo Martínez	Christian Democratic Party	26 March 1962 – 29 March 1962	Arturo Frondizi
52	Ernesto J. Lanusse	Radical Civic Union	29 March 1962 – 30 April 1962	José María Guido
53	José Luis Cantilo	Radical Civic Union	30 April 1962 – 30 August 1962	José María Guido
54	Adolfo Lanús	Radical Civic Union	30 August 1962 – 5 October 1962	José María Guido
55	José Manuel Astigueta	Independent	5 October 1962 – 12 October 1963	José María Guido
56	Leopoldo Suárez	Radical Civic Union	12 October 1963 – 28 June 1966	Arturo Illia
57	Antonio Lanusse	Independent	28 June 1966 – 11 March 1967	Juan Carlos Onganía
58	Emilio van Peborgh	Independent	24 March 1967 – 8 June 1969	Juan Carlos Onganía
59	José Cáceres Monié	MID	28 June 1969 – 18 June 1970	Juan Carlos Onganía
59	José Cáceres Monié	MID	18 June 1970 – 22 March 1971	Roberto Marcelo Levingston
59	José Cáceres Monié	MID	22 March 1971 – 9 May 1972	Alejandro Lanusse
60	Eduardo Aguirre Obarrio	Independent	9 May 1972 – 25 May 1973	Alejandro Lanusse
61	Ángel Robledo	Justicialist Party	25 May 1973 – 13 July 1973	Héctor Cámpora
61	Ángel Robledo	Justicialist Party	13 July 1973 – 12 October 1973	Raúl Lastiri
61	Ángel Robledo	Justicialist Party	12 October 1973 – 1 July 1974	Juan Domingo Perón
61	Ángel Robledo	Justicialist Party	1 July 1974 – 13 August 1974	Isabel Perón
62	Adolfo M. Savino	Independent	14 August 1974 – 11 July 1975	Isabel Perón
63	Jorge Garrido	Independent	11 July 1975 – 16 September 1975	Isabel Perón
64	Tomás Vottero	Independent	16 September 1975 – 15 January 1976	Isabel Perón
65	Ricardo Guardo	Justicialist Party	22 January 1976 – 8 March 1976	Isabel Perón
66	José Deheza	Justicialist Party	12 March 1976 – 24 March 1976	Isabel Perón
67	José María Klix	Independent (Military)	29 March 1976 – 30 October 1978	Jorge Rafael Videla
68	David de la Riva	Independent (Military)	5 November 1978 – 29 March 1981	Jorge Rafael Videla
69	Norberto Couto	Independent (Military)	29 March 1981 – 12 December 1981	Roberto Viola
Ministry of Defense (1981–Present)
70	Amadeo Frúgoli	Independent	22 December 1981 – 1 July 1982	Leopoldo Galtieri
71	Julio Martínez Vivot	Independent	2 July 1982 – 10 December 1983	Reynaldo Bignone
72	Raúl Borrás	Radical Civic Union	10 December 1983 – 27 May 1985	Raúl Alfonsín
73	Roque Carranza	Radical Civic Union	27 May 1985 – 8 February 1986	Raúl Alfonsín
74	Germán López	Radical Civic Union	8 February 1986 – 2 June 1986	Raúl Alfonsín
75	Horacio Jaunarena	Radical Civic Union	2 June 1986 – 8 July 1989	Raúl Alfonsín
76	Ítalo Luder	Justicialist Party	8 July 1989 – 26 January 1990	Carlos Menem
77	Humberto Romero	Justicialist Party	26 January 1990 – 31 January 1991	Carlos Menem
78	Guido Di Tella	Justicialist Party	31 January 1991 – 1 March 1991	Carlos Menem
79	Antonio Erman González	Justicialist Party	1 March 1991 – 9 December 1993	Carlos Menem
80	Oscar Camilión	MID	9 December 1993 – 7 August 1996	Carlos Menem
81	Jorge Domínguez	Justicialist Party	7 August 1996 – 10 December 1999	Carlos Menem
81	Ricardo López Murphy	Radical Civic Union	10 December 1999 – 5 March 2001	Fernando de la Rúa
82	Horacio Jaunarena	Radical Civic Union	5 March 2001 – 21 December 2001	Fernando de la Rúa
83	José María Vernet	Justicialist Party	23 December 2001 – 30 December 2001	Adolfo Rodríguez Saá
84	Horacio Jaunarena	Radical Civic Union	3 January 2002 – 25 May 2003	Eduardo Duhalde
85	José Pampuro	Justicialist Party	25 May 2003 – 1 December 2005	Néstor Kirchner
86	Nilda Garré	Broad Front	1 December 2005 – 10 December 2007	Néstor Kirchner
86	Nilda Garré	Broad Front	10 December 2007 – 15 December 2010	Cristina Fernández de Kirchner
87	Arturo Puricelli	Justicialist Party	15 December 2010 – 30 May 2013	Cristina Fernández de Kirchner
88	Agustín Rossi	Justicialist Party	30 May 2013 – 10 December 2015	Cristina Fernández de Kirchner
89	Julio Martínez	Radical Civic Union	10 December 2015 – 17 July 2017	Mauricio Macri
90	Oscar Aguad	Radical Civic Union	17 July 2017 – 10 December 2019	Mauricio Macri
91	Agustín Rossi	Justicialist Party	10 December 2019 – 10 August 2021	Alberto Fernández
92	Jorge Taiana	Justicialist Party	10 August 2021 – 10 December 2023	Alberto Fernández
93	Luis Petri	Radical Civic Union	10 December 2023 – 10 December 2025	Javier Milei
94	Carlos Presti	Independent (Military)	10 December 2025 - present	Javier Milei

== See also ==
- Argentine defense industry
- Argentine Armed Forces
- Defence diplomacy
