= Carlos Pellegrini =

6th President of Argentina (1846–1906)

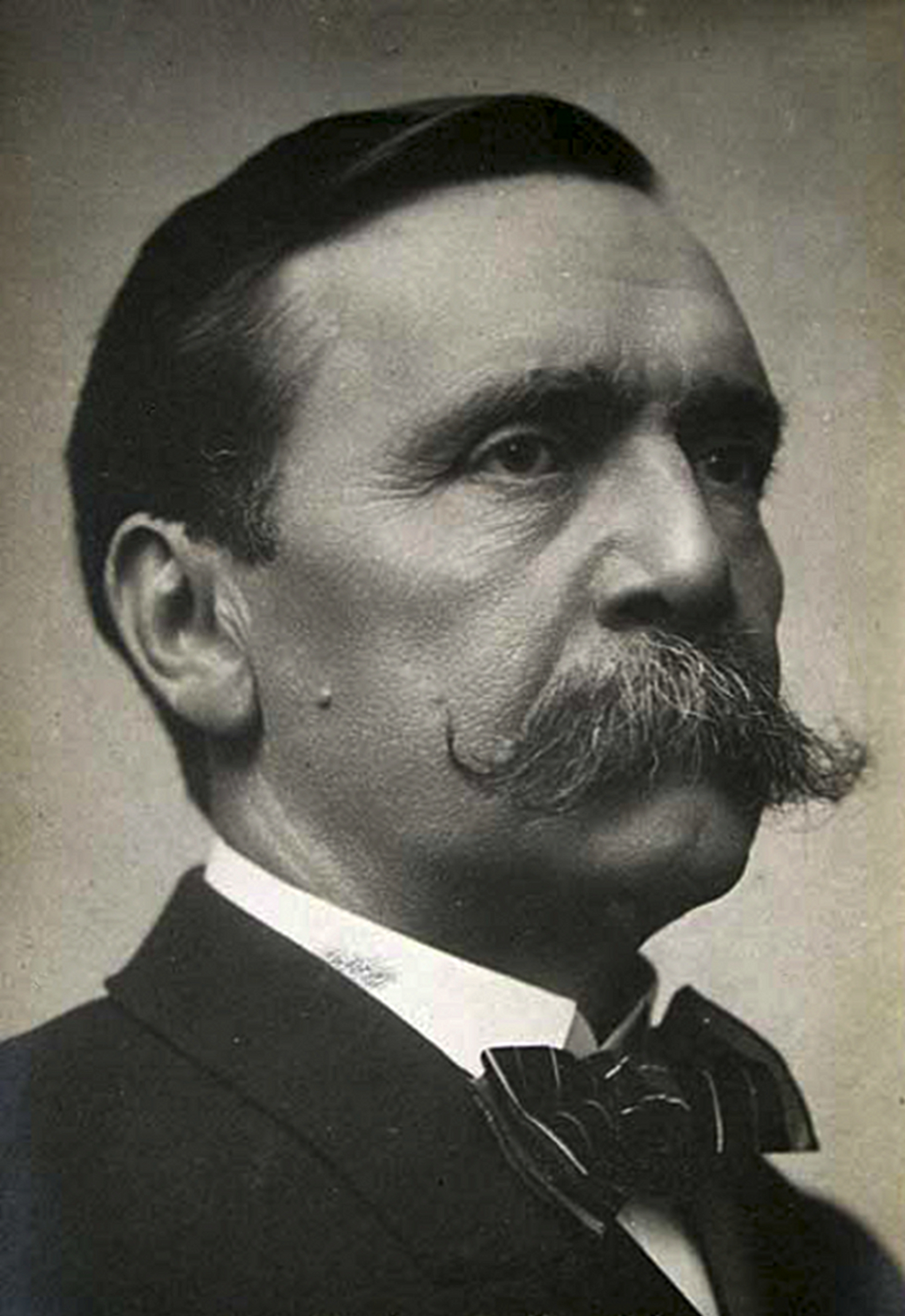

11th President of Argentina
- In office August 7, 1890 – October 11, 1892
- Preceded by: Miguel Juárez Celman
- Succeeded by: Luis Sáenz Peña

7th Vice President of Argentina
- In office October 11, 1886 – August 6, 1890
- President: Miguel Juárez Celman
- Preceded by: Francisco Bernabé Madero
- Succeeded by: Jose Evaristo Uriburu

Minister of War and the Navy
- In office June 11, 1885 – October 12, 1886
- President: Julio Argentino Roca
- Preceded by: Benjamín Victorica
- Succeeded by: Nicolás Levalle
- In office October 9, 1879 – October 12, 1880
- President: Nicolás Avellaneda
- Preceded by: Julio Argentino Roca
- Succeeded by: Benjamín Victorica

Personal details
- Born: Carlos Enrique José Pellegrini Bevans; October 11, 1846 Buenos Aires
- Died: July 17, 1906 (aged 59) Buenos Aires
- Resting place: La Recoleta Cemetery
- Party: National Autonomist Party
- Spouse: Carolina Lagos
- Parent(s): Charles Henri Pellegrini; María Bevans Bright
- Occupation: politician
- Profession: lawyer

Carlos Enrique José Pellegrini Bevans (October 11, 1846 – July 17, 1906) was Vice President of Argentina and became President of Argentina from August 6, 1890 to October 12, 1892, upon Miguel Ángel Juárez Celman's resignation (see Revolución del Parque).

== Biography ==
Pellegrini was the son of Swiss-Italian engineer Charles Henri Pellegrini (born in Chambéry) and María Bevans Bright, and grandson of English engineer James "Santiago" Bevans.

Like many other nineteenth century Argentines prominent in public life, he was a Freemason.

Carlos Enrique José Pellegrini was born in the city of Buenos Aires on 11 October 1846, during the Rosas era; he was the son of the British-born María Bevans and the Swiss engineer (of French descent) Carlos Enrique Pellegrini, originally from Chambéry (Kingdom of Sardinia). In the 1855 census, his childhood home appears when he was 9 years old, living with his parents in Buenos Aires, his older sister Julia, and two younger siblings: Ernesto and Ana, at Corrientes Street 188.

The engineer Charles Henry Pellegrini had arrived in the country from Switzerland in 1828, having been hired by president Bernardino Rivadavia for the construction of the Port of Buenos Aires. Upon his arrival in the country, the project was suspended due to a change of government. Unable to practice his profession, Pellegrini's father began working in Argentina as a portrait painter, and soon became one of the most sought-after artists in Buenos Aires society. He maintained a strong interest in political and social debates occurring in Europe, and his private library contained many British journals specializing in these subjects, such as The Edinburgh Review, The Quarterly Review, and The Westminster Review. On his mother's side, María Bevans was the daughter of the British engineer Santiago Bevans, who had also arrived in the Río de la Plata under circumstances similar to those of his future son-in-law. María was a niece of the British liberal politician John Bright, co-founder of the Manchester League and a close collaborator of William Gladstone. These family characteristics placed the Pellegrini family in a central position in the social life of the city of Buenos Aires.

His father was the first to introduce him to reading and writing on a small family ranch in Cañuelas. A maternal aunt taught him English at an early age, a language that Carlos mastered perfectly and spoke fluently throughout his life. At the age of eight he entered the school of Ana Bevans, his aunt. It is possible that his early instruction in English left a slight trace in his pronunciation, from which came the nickname el Gringo, as he was called by his classmates at the Colegio Nacional de Buenos Aires. He graduated from that institution in 1862.

He entered the Faculty of Law of Buenos Aires in 1863, but two years later abandoned his studies to join the army and fight in the Paraguayan War. There he served as an artillery ensign, eventually reaching the rank of officer. Pellegrini distinguished himself in the Battle of Tuyutí, as well as in other engagements, but he fell ill and had to permanently leave the army. After recovering he returned to Buenos Aires, completed his law studies in 1869, and joined the recently founded newspaper La Prensa. With his university degree he began working for the state as undersecretary of the Ministry of Finance, under constitutional convention member Benjamín Gorostiaga during the government of Domingo F. Sarmiento. During the last three years of that presidency a struggle arose between autonomists and nationalists, and Pellegrini joined the Autonomist Party led by Adolfo Alsina. He was a candidate for deputy in the elections of 1870 and 1871 but was defeated by the nationalists commanded by Bartolomé Mitre. Only after Alsina's victory, and thanks to the election of governor Mariano Acosta in the province of Buenos Aires, did Pellegrini obtain his first legislative seat. He was the youngest among the provincial deputies, at only twenty-six years of age, and his first speech concerned the conversion of paper currency; throughout his career he took part in debates related to monetary and economic matters.

In his graduation thesis El derecho electoral (Electoral Law) he criticized the system in force at the time and proposed a broad campaign of civic education. A brief excerpt reads:

Government protection is necessary for the industrial development of the Argentine Republic.

He was an autonomist candidate during the elections of 1874, in which there was no freedom of suffrage and only a minority of citizens loyal to the government were allowed to vote. The struggle between the autonomist committee of Adolfo Alsina and Leandro Alem against the "national" faction of Mitre and Eduardo Costa produced moments of tension, largely as a result of the fraud and violence that prevailed during the elections. The government of Sarmiento ended up accepting what was described as the "most scandalous and bloody" victory recorded in electoral history up to that moment. This electoral fraud served as a precedent for the Revolution of 1874. Although the uprising was suppressed, it produced consequences similar to those of 1852, continuing the abstention and conspiracies of the nationalist liberals. Alsina, governor of Buenos Aires at that time, disputed the presidential succession with Mitre; failing to obtain his support, he withdrew his candidacy and instead backed Nicolás Avellaneda, a candidacy that Pellegrini also supported. In the mixed elections of 1878 Pellegrini was re-elected national deputy. After Alsina's death the Autonomist Party became disoriented and split into two currents: one representing the localism of Tejedor, and another seeking links with the provinces to create a national party. Pellegrini defended the federal doctrine and opposed the abuse of federal interventions. During the confrontation between Buenos Aires and the provinces he actively supported the national movement led by the young general Julio Argentino Roca, who enjoyed the backing of much of the interior of the country, distancing himself from Tejedor's Buenos Aires localism. From this period dates the friendship between Pellegrini and Roca. The general would seek Pellegrini's advice for some of his most important documents produced during that political struggle. It was also through this relationship that Roca eventually abandoned Tejedor's localist ideas. This alliance became the epicenter of political activity for at least twenty years; few institutional, economic, or political matters were resolved without the involvement of Roca and Pellegrini. Referring to this, Roca stated: "I find (in the Capital) a great party... provincial, raw and pure, succeeding and gathering the scattered party of Alsina".

Pellegrini was among the early supporters of civil rights for women in Argentina, proposing that they be granted the right to vote. These ideas may have stemmed from family tradition, as his great-aunt Priscila Bright, the wife of a Lord Provost, had been one of the promoters of women's suffrage in England.

In 1871, a tragic year in Buenos Aires when thousands died from the yellow fever epidemic, Pellegrini married Carolina Ignacia Lagos García, a union that produced no children. That same year he began his political involvement through Alsina's Autonomist Party when he ran in the legislative elections of 1871 and 1872, though he lost both contests. Finally, in 1873 he was elected deputy for the Buenos Aires Province.

=== Deputy (1873–1877) ===
As mentioned above, in 1873 he was elected national deputy, and in 1878 governor Carlos Casares appointed him minister of government of the Buenos Aires Province. His six years as a deputy were characterized by strong oratorical ability and clarity of expression. His fellow legislator José Manuel Estrada, although an opponent, praised Pellegrini's speaking ability when he remarked: "If you do not understand me, I will ask deputy Pellegrini to explain it to you as only he knows how".

During his years as a deputy he adopted a position in favor of free education, taking the United States educational model as an example (as did Domingo Faustino Sarmiento). During debates between liberalism and protectionism around 1875, Pellegrini supported state policies aimed at protecting national industry and was also among the principal figures involved in founding the Industrial Club.

The following fragment of a parliamentary speech by Pellegrini illustrates his inclination toward industrialization:

If free trade develops an industry that has already acquired a certain vigor and allows it to reach its fullest splendor, free trade kills the nascent industry. Agriculture and livestock are two great fundamental industries; but no nation on earth has reached the summit of economic development with only those industries. The industries that have brought nations to the maximum of power are manufacturing industries, and the manufacturing industry is the first in merit and the last to be attained, because it is the highest expression of industrial progress.

— Fragment of a parliamentary speech by Carlos Pellegrini.

=== Minister of War and Navy (1879–1886) ===
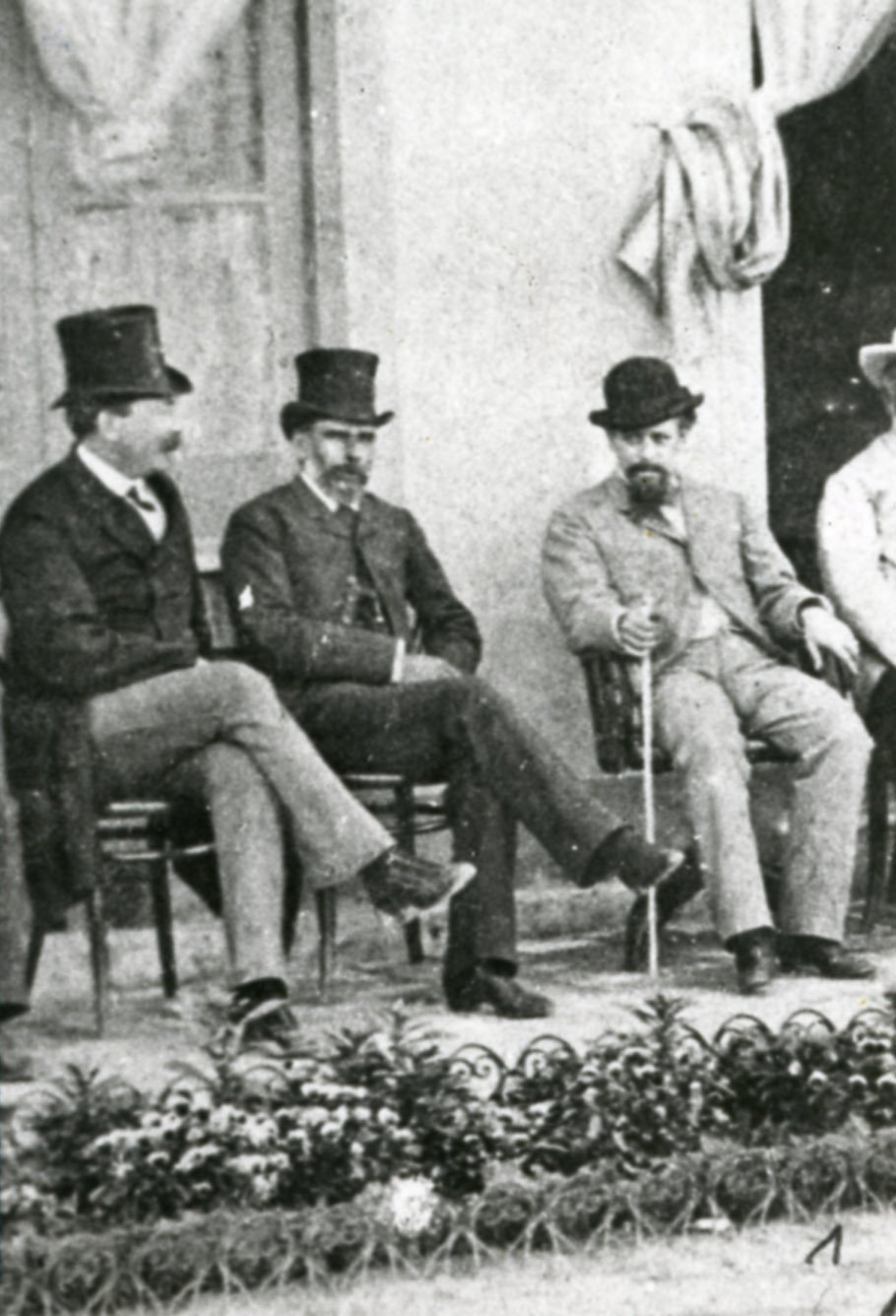
Carlos Pellegrini (first) with Julio A. Roca (third), photo circa 1880.

On 9 October 1879, president Nicolás Avellaneda appointed Carlos Pellegrini minister of War and Navy to replace Julio Argentino Roca (a position he also held during Roca's presidency until 12 October 1886). In that role he had to confront the rebellion of Carlos Tejedor in 1880, the governor of Buenos Aires, who refused to accept the Federalization Law that removed the Federal Capital from the jurisdiction of the province of Buenos Aires. Pellegrini was responsible for suppressing the rebellion, which increased his prominence within Argentine politics.

During his tenure at the Ministry of War he helped create a depoliticized military institution intended solely to defend the government and the constitutional order without conspiring against it.

Working with the Naval School he created the Naval Artillery, Pilots, and Naval Engineers corps. He also built a gunpowder factory in Luján and established the regulations of the Naval School as well as the maritime signal code.

=== Senator (1881–1883) ===
In 1881 he was elected national senator for the Buenos Aires Province to complete the term of Dardo Rocha, serving until 30 April 1883. During his time in the Senate he secured congressional approval to resume construction of the Port of Buenos Aires, which had remained unfinished since the presidency of Bernardino Rivadavia. He adopted the earlier project of Eduardo Madero, and through financing and British technicians the port was completed nine years later, when Pellegrini was serving as vice president.

Pellegrini traveled to the United States and Canada in 1883 to observe and study industrial development in the leading industrial nations, visiting factories, laboratories, and workshops. Like Domingo Faustino Sarmiento, he also traveled to North America to examine how education was organized there.

He was commissioned by the government of Julio Argentino Roca to negotiate a delicate loan with creditors in Europe in 1885.

=== Vice presidency (1886–1890) ===
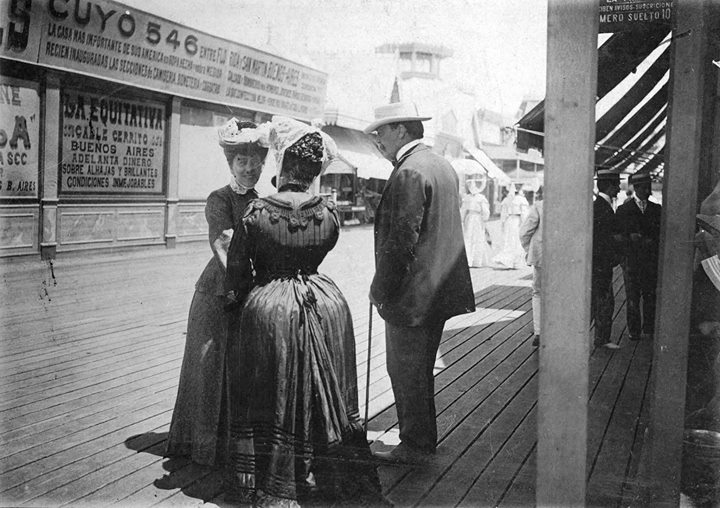
Pellegrini on a wooden promenade in Mar del Plata with his wife.

In 1886, when his term as senator ended, he became a candidate for vice president. Pellegrini had already supported the candidacy of Miguel Juárez Celman for president on behalf of the National Autonomist Party (PAN), as a continuation of liberal policies. Juárez Celman received support from most provincial governors and from Julio A. Roca himself. Because Pellegrini remained minister of War until the day of the election to ensure order during the voting, he delivered no campaign speeches and did not participate in the campaign; nevertheless he was elected vice president, much like Sarmiento earlier, without campaigning or presenting himself before the electorate.

During the administration of Juárez Celman, particularly in March 1890, the Argentine peso (the peso moneda nacional) began to lose value sharply relative to gold (the international means of payment). Bankruptcies followed, the stock exchange collapsed, and the cost of living rose considerably.

As the government strengthened its influence over customs revenues and the national army, its authority expanded into the provinces, affecting provincial autonomy. This led to the formation of a single party under the orders of the president, known as the "unicato", which provoked intense popular opposition. At this point Pellegrini began to distance himself from Juárez Celman when the latter proclaimed the "unicato" and concentrated state authority and party leadership in his own hands. When the first revolutionary events of 1890 occurred, Vice President Pellegrini upheld government authority and commanded troops to suppress the uprising. When Juárez Celman went to Retiro to board a ship bound for Campana, Pellegrini rode on horseback to Plaza Libertad to inspect the command of General Nicolás Levalle. He established himself at the house of José Luis Amadeo and directed from there the final assault on the artillery park. Growing accusations of political corruption, authoritarianism, and a severe economic crisis culminated in an uprising in Buenos Aires known as the Revolution of the Park. On 26 July 1890 a civic-military group led by the newly formed Civic Union, under leaders such as Leandro Alem, Bartolomé Mitre, Aristóbulo del Valle, and Bernardo de Irigoyen, attempted to overthrow the government by force. Although the attempt failed, President Juárez Celman resigned. Earlier, on 11 April many ministers had already resigned due to the worsening situation. Two days later a crowd of thirty thousand people demonstrated at the Frontón of Buenos Aires, filling Córdoba Avenue between Libertad and Cerrito streets. The president reshuffled the cabinet on 18 April in response to the crisis. The situation worsened further when on 28 June senator Del Valle denounced irregularities in public finances, especially fraudulent currency issues. On 5 August pro-government legislators themselves demanded Juárez Celman's resignation. The next day the request was accepted by a vote of 61 to 22, and Carlos Pellegrini assumed the presidency. Pellegrini had previously maintained a low profile, but he now became head of state and therefore the central figure in Argentine politics, which was immersed in a crisis following the collapse of several financial institutions.

He had undertaken a trip to Europe in 1889 as the Argentine representative to the Exposition Universelle held in Paris to commemorate the centenary of the French Revolution, where the Argentine pavilion attracted considerable attention. The trip also sought financial support in London and Paris and attempted to address the approaching economic difficulties. Pellegrini was decorated in Spain, the United Kingdom, and France.

In correspondence addressed to his brother, Pellegrini explained the recent crisis:

They will ask what must be done then. But the same thing a farmer does when he loses his harvest: endure; tighten the belt and economize everything possible while sowing again. Protect industry by every possible means; and forget the Stock Exchange and Treasuries and bimetallism and heavenly music!

— Carlos Pellegrini.

==== Crisis of 1890 ====
The state, seeking to accelerate progress, relied heavily on foreign loans, encouraged immigration, distributed public lands, and guaranteed foreign capital investment, to the point that the country at one moment appeared flooded with money; however, these finances were insignificant compared with the obligations of the contracted debt services. This was compounded by excessive credit, exaggerated speculation, overexploitation of state resources, rapid currency depreciation, and deficits in both the national budget and the balance of trade. Up to that point most Argentine governments had spent more than the country was able to sustain, a pattern not uncommon among young nations attempting to match the level of already developed countries.

As a consequence of the rapid pace of institutional change, extensive public works, and immigration that exceeded the country's capacity for absorption, a political crisis developed culminating in the revolution of 1890 and the resignation of President Miguel Juárez Celman. It was the first time since the adoption of the Constitution twenty years earlier that a president failed to complete his term. It also inaugurated in Argentina a pattern of attempted coups, revealing the impatience of certain social sectors to seize power and carry out reforms aimed at satisfying public opinion. Although Pellegrini was vice president at the time, Miguel Ángel Cárcano suggested that the financial and social crisis he faced was not the result of his own errors. The new president called upon distinguished figures such as Rufino Varela and Wenceslao Paunero to assist him. Everyone recognized the symptoms and causes of the crisis, but no one could see a short-term solution. The process continued according to its natural course: the country became paralyzed, speculation ceased, credit dried up, bad businesses were liquidated, and both government and private actors reduced expenditures; large public works were halted until national production restored confidence and prosperity and generated new wealth for the country.

=== Presidency ===
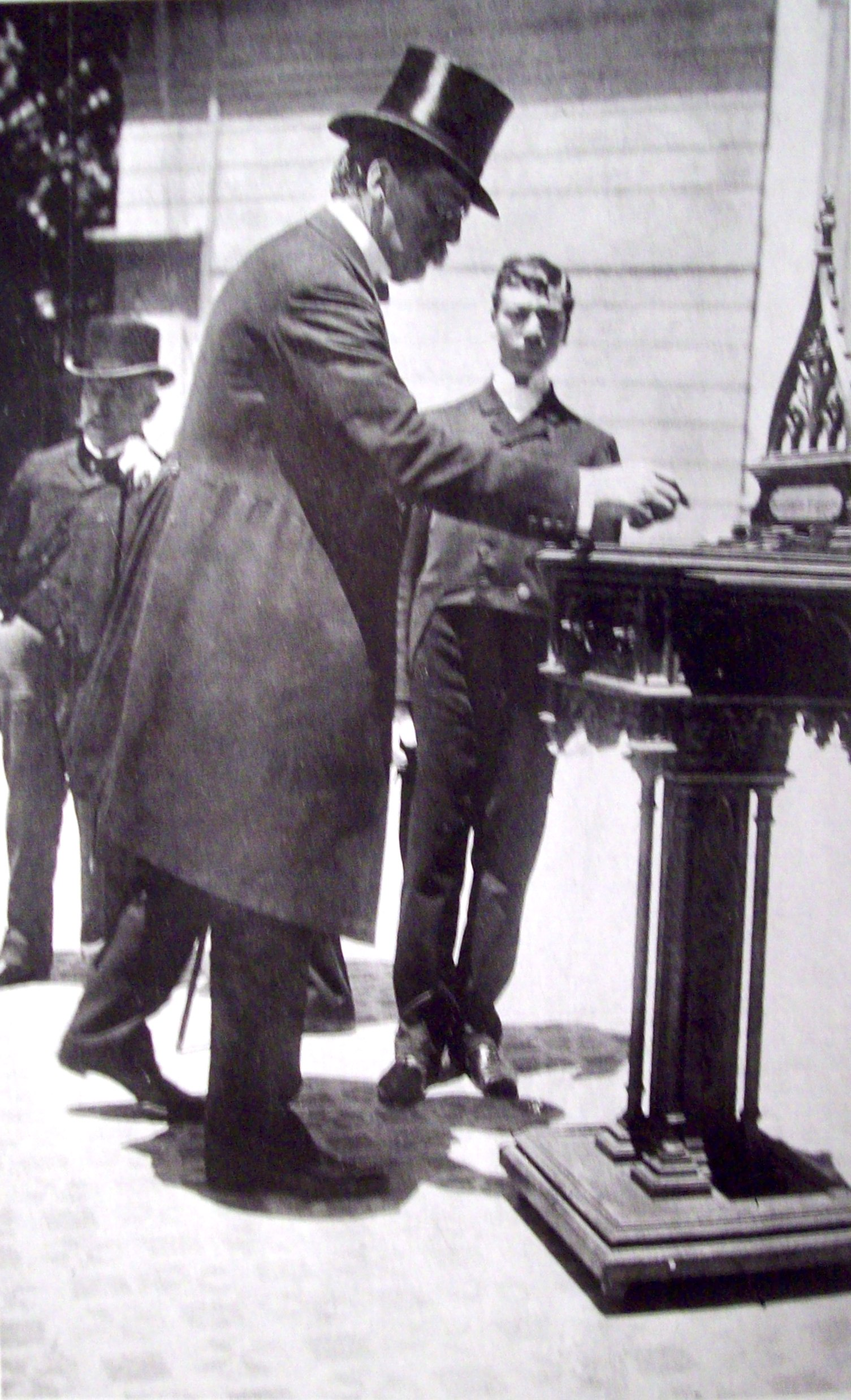
Carlos Pellegrini casting his vote in an open-air church atrium.

As a result of the Revolution of 1890, President Miguel Juárez Celman resigned, and Pellegrini succeeded him as president on 6 August 1890, completing the term on 12 October 1892, as stipulated in the Constitution. The new president took office in a country devastated by the crisis, with fiscal revenues having fallen to 30% compared with previous years; banks were paralyzed and the price of gold was rising, pushing the economy into a deep recession that "froze" financial institutions. When he assumed office he was forty-four years old and had already had an active political career as a deputy and minister, positions he had held on several occasions.

During his administration, Pellegrini cleaned up the finances and created the Banco de la Nación Argentina, Argentina's national bank, and the prestigious high-school that carries his name, Escuela Superior de Comercio Carlos Pellegrini, public school of noted academic level, part of Universidad de Buenos Aires.

Pellegrini appointed as ministers men of recognized public reputation, drawn from the most important political centers of the time. These included figures from the National Autonomist Party led by Roca, the Civic Party led by Mitre, and even a certain nucleus from the Civic Union. Former president Julio Argentino Roca was appointed Minister of the Interior; he was the most influential person in the cabinet and managed to prevent the success of Alem's revolution. Eduardo Costa was appointed Minister of Foreign Affairs; he was a close friend of Mitre and a renowned jurist. Vicente Fidel López, a defender of the policies of General Urquiza and of the San Nicolás Agreement, accepted—despite his advanced age—the position of Minister of Finance in order to repair the national finances. Lieutenant Nicolás Levalle, a close collaborator of Roca, continued as Minister of War and the Navy. José María Gutiérrez took charge of the portfolios of Justice, Worship, and the Navy. He was also a friend of Mitre and, as a journalist, had collaborated on the newspaper La Nación. Three ministers were linked to the revolutionary party.

The minister Vicente Fidel López presented to Congress several laws aimed at improving and expanding fiscal revenue. Another measure completing the plan to overcome the crisis was the project he had presented with Aristóbulo del Valle in 1881, during his time as national senator for Buenos Aires Province. This new scheme consisted of creating the Bank of the Republic. Consequently, in 1891 the Banco de la Nación Argentina was founded, with mixed capital and a sum of fifty million pesos; its first president was Vicente Casares. Once the Argentine currency recovered backing, the Conversion Office was created, and these measures, combined with the increase in money in circulation, eventually ended the crisis. The government had sought funds to establish the bank that would meet the needs of commerce and industry. To obtain the capital it ultimately had to request internal credit after several unsuccessful attempts to obtain loans abroad. Until that capital was secured, and in order for the bank to begin operations immediately, the Banco de la Nación Argentina was created, promoted by the government as a private bank; it required government capital, which was provided through the issuance of a loan of fifty million pesos through the Conversion Office against a government bond. The new bank was prohibited from conducting operations with governments and municipalities, except with the national government, but even then could not agree to more than two million pesos. General Lucio V. Mansilla was one of the defenders of the new Banco de la Nación. His debates in Congress convinced much of the opposition to carry out the project, despite the fact that his oratory did not display great economic expertise, arguing that the creation of a bank was necessary to stabilize the circulation of currency.

Upon assuming office, Pellegrini gathered a group of merchants, landowners, and bankers to ask them to subscribe to a short-term loan of fifteen million pesos to pay the first service on the external debt, which was due in a week. The loan was quickly covered. Before completing a month in office, the new president sent the Senate a "complete financial plan". Due to the scarcity of fiduciary means, the government had to resort to issuing currency through a bill authorizing treasury notes up to sixty million pesos in order to cancel bank-issued currency. Another measure authorized the sale of public assets guaranteeing the sixty million of the National Bank. A third regulation created the Conversion Office and a commission for the liquidation of the national debt. The Minister of Finance calculated that within ten years it would produce a profit of twenty million pesos, which would allow the government to meet other guarantees and withdraw from circulation the amounts that needed to be amortized, resulting in a revaluation of the currency. A fifth law obliged guaranteed banks to convert their emissions. The sixth authorized a loan of twenty million gold pesos to service the external debt and relieve the budget. Concessions for railways and public works guaranteed by the nation whose concessionaires had not fulfilled contractual conditions were declared void.

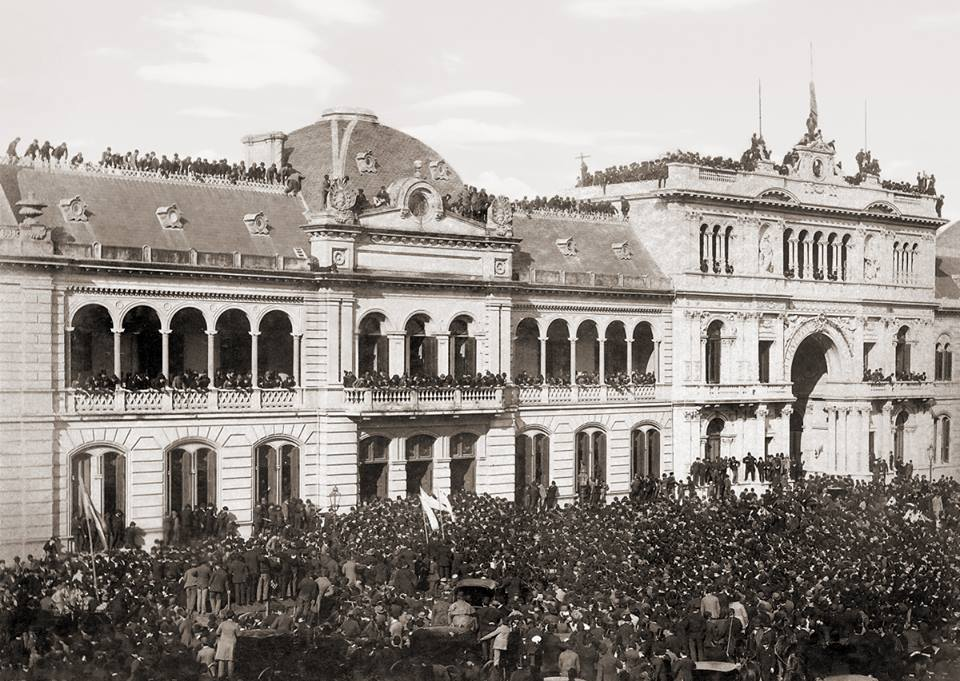
The Casa Rosada on the day of Carlos Pellegrini's inauguration, 1890.

Minister Lucio V. López vigorously defended his plan before the Senate, recalling analogous situations through which the country had already passed; in his view those crises had been successfully confronted with measures similar to those he proposed. He proposed a balanced budget, lowering the value of imports and increasing exports the following year. He declared himself nonpartisan and affirmed his nationalist ideas. Congress quickly approved the most urgent projects, while the executive branch extended the sessions of the chambers so that the budget and other measures could be sanctioned. The twenty-million-gold-peso loan was passed into law together with the Conversion Office, the latter measure being the most effective remedy for stabilizing the legal tender. But these measures did not have an immediate effect: the situation of the Baring house worsened, and the country's bankers in London were unable to place Argentine securities on the European market, depriving the Argentine government of the capital necessary to meet commitments. The Minister of Finance converted fifty million pesos into gold to give the financial system breathing room and sent them to Baring to pay its debt services. However, this operation exhausted the metallic capital that existed and the banks entered liquidation. The minister focused more on addressing the external credit problem and ignored those who advised temporarily suspending debt service in order to study what measures should be adopted. The biggest problem was the devaluation of the currency in relation to Treasury obligations. Since revenue was collected in depreciated paper currency while obligations were paid in metallic currency, a point was reached where resources were insufficient to cover expenses. The banknote had depreciated from 247 pesos in August to 307 pesos in December, and the government could not punctually pay administrative salaries.

Victorino de la Plaza was selected to negotiate the debt and embarked for London, where he received refusals from the banks of that country. Nevertheless he succeeded in obtaining from the Rothschild banking house a moratorium before the Argentine government ceased payment. Having achieved this first step, Pellegrini implemented austerity and adjustment measures, such as suspending public works including the Government House, the Congress, and the Central Post Office (which were resumed after his government ended), and he nationalized sanitary works that had been privatized by Miguel Juárez Celman. De la Plaza also resolved in London the problem faced by the house of Baring Brothers, which held Argentine securities that could not be placed; they advised reaching an agreement with the French and Germans and contracting a loan sufficient to cover external debt services for three years. The loan would prevent the external debt from weighing on the budget and new taxes would increase state revenues. The loan amounted to seventy-five million national gold pesos in bonds bearing 6% interest under very severe conditions: its proceeds had to be used exclusively to pay external debt and the country committed itself not to contract new loans for three years. To balance the budget, the minister created new taxes and increased existing ones. A 7% tax was imposed on the profits and dividends of private banks and joint-stock companies whose management and capital were not based in the country, excepting meat-packing factories, refrigeration plants, and railways. Customs duties were also increased, mainly on luxury goods. Payment of duties in gold was established, export taxes were increased by 2%, and stamp taxes were also raised.

Some newspapers opposed to the government were allowed to circulate. Through a project presented by Dardo Rocha, the government granted amnesty to members of the army who had participated in the Revolution of 1890. A new civic register was ordered for the entire territory of the Republic, renewable every two years, and the electoral roll was opened to allow citizens to register. The electoral law for choosing the deliberative council of the Federal Capital was reformed, and elections were held to establish the elective council, seeking to improve deficiencies and eliminate abuses in public spending. Personal credit had practically disappeared, bankruptcies among joint-stock companies increased, and the National Mortgage Bank suspended payment of interest on its certificates while the price of gold rose to 446 pesos. The president convened a "meeting of notables" at the Government House, with representatives from all sectors of the economy—commerce, industry, livestock, and agriculture—in order to hear the opinions of members of parliament and other leaders outside the government. This occurred amid high popular tension following an attempt on the life of the Minister of the Interior. The president sent a project to issue metallic banknotes through the Conversion Office, which the government and the National Mortgage Bank would receive as gold. At the same time he negotiated with bankers in the capital for a loan that would provide immediate resources to the banks. The commission composed of Gorostiaga, Uriburu, Romero, Paats, Varela, and Anderson presented its report to the president; that night the head of state met with his ministers and approved it. They resolved to issue a loan of one hundred million national pesos, the proceeds to be delivered to the Conversion Office to aid official banks and prevent bankruptcy.

Pellegrini abolished official agricultural colonization by private companies, which had yielded good results only in Santa Fe Province, and reviewed the application of laws that granted large tracts of public land to private individuals. However, the administration that studied the old files did not revise reform projects that remained shelved. Nor did it decisively confront the sale and settlement of extensive areas under state ownership. Livestock exploitation gradually gave way to agriculture. The plow improved agricultural work. Exportable grains increased in geometric proportion relative to meat and hides. The construction of railway networks, immigration, and the arrival of foreign capital transformed the country's economic and social landscape. The sale of 17 million hectares of public land resulted from the pressure of the expanding national economy; despite the disorder in which the sales occurred, state wealth was not compromised. Pellegrini's administration attempted to organize the management of public lands, noting that the 30 million leagues recently alienated had not produced output. Under the authority of the Land Office it was regulated that only the President of the Nation could sign sales deeds, and an investigation was decreed into property rights under the 1882 law. Soon 4 million hectares were recovered, though shortly afterward 3.5 million hectares were again delivered to speculation. Government intentions to offer surveyed, measured, marked, and subdivided public lands for sale to genuine farmers remained largely declarative, since abuses with land rewards and bearer certificates in favor of members of the army continued, while the alienation of large tracts without consultation persisted. Public lands had always been distributed generously, governments were often involved in such policies, and subsequent administrations continued them.

The Argentine National Historical Museum was built and the institution that would bear his name, the Carlos Pellegrini Higher School of Commerce, was established, and work began on the Buenos Aires Botanical Garden. Lands held by railway companies whose concessionaires had failed to pay were recovered. Because of these policies Pellegrini was considered protectionist; he himself stated: "When necessary, the State must intervene in economic life, and when it is not indispensable it should not do so. It is as simple as that."

An anarchist plot to assassinate the president was discovered. He presented his resignation in August 1892 after a severe political crisis in his government; however, he was persuaded to remain until 12 October 1892. The presidential election of 1892 was, after many years, the first held without fraud, resulting in the election of Luis Sáenz Peña and allowing the election of senators such as Aristóbulo del Valle and Leandro N. Alem. Sáenz Peña offered Pellegrini the position of Minister of War and the Navy, but he declined. After relinquishing the presidency, Pellegrini walked to his residence at Florida and Viamonte without any escort.

=== Later political activities ===
At the end of his presidency he temporarily withdrew to private life and attempted to venture into business, but it did not take him long to return to politics. The leaders of the National Autonomist Party, Carlos Pellegrini and Julio Argentino Roca, had doubts about the effectiveness of president Luis Sáenz Peña, who had been a magistrate of the Supreme Court and a legislator on several occasions, but had never had any experience in governing. Although the economic situation was fairly prosperous as a consequence of the gold brought in by exports of raw materials such as hides, wool and oilseeds, the political situation at that time was complicated.

The new government soon began to face problems; after the resignation of several ministers, Miguel Cané proposed reshaping the cabinet. To do so, he asked Luis Sáenz Peña to summon three key figures in Argentine politics at the time: Pellegrini, Mitre and Roca. A meeting was held to bring the three politicians together, but the agreement did not work, to the point that Roca resigned. Luis Sáenz Peña — following Pellegrini's prior advice — summoned Aristóbulo del Valle so that he could persuade Leandro N. Alem to calm the situation. Del Valle was appointed minister of the interior on 4 July 1893 and formed an anti-Roca cabinet. He tried to convince the Alemist radicals to join it, but without success, and almost immediately uprisings led by the Radical Civic Union began to break out in Buenos Aires, Santa Fe, San Luis and Tucumán, while the National Civic faction did the same in Corrientes and in a parallel uprising in Buenos Aires. Pellegrini, who was at that moment in Rosario de la Frontera, tried to return quickly to Buenos Aires to help repress the revolutionaries. An anecdotal episode occurred when the train carrying Pellegrini to Buenos Aires encountered revolutionary troops in Haedo, so he could have been detained, but Hipólito Yrigoyen ordered that he be allowed to pass; that decision caused great discontent in the Alemist circle, but the episode demonstrated the good relationship that existed between Yrigoyen and Pellegrini. He accompanied the loyal troops that left to suppress the rebellion in Tucumán, a successful mission considering that he had no support from Congress or from the president. In 1894 Luis Sáenz Peña resigned and was replaced by José Evaristo Uriburu.

Alem had studied law alongside Pellegrini, so a friendship existed between them, but after the civil uprisings this bond was broken, to the point that around 1894 the two challenged each other to a duel after exchanging correspondence, although a commission of arbiters prevented the outcome.

In 1893 gubernatorial elections were held in Buenos Aires Province. Pellegrini was a candidate for the Unión Provincial, the name used by the PAN in that district, but he was defeated by the Radical Civic Union, while the Mitristas finished in third place, this time in relatively close elections without fraud. But as no candidate had obtained an absolute majority, the decision fell to the provincial legislature. There he used his influence in favor of the Mitrista Guillermo Udaondo, displacing the radical candidate who had won. The legislature also resolved to designate Pellegrini as national senator. Back in the legislature, Pellegrini did not take long to become the central figure in the Senate, something that irritated president Uriburu, who came to accuse the senator of tyrannizing the upper chamber.

==== Senator (1895–1904) ====
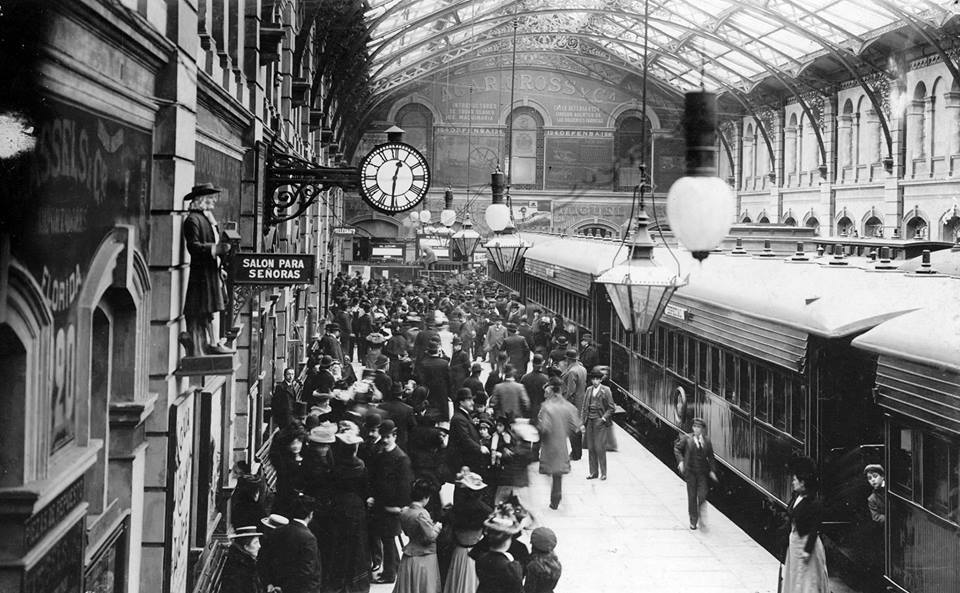
Pellegrini leaves Constitución railway station in Buenos Aires for the Port of La Plata, to travel to Europe, in 1900.

After his presidential term ended, he served as senator for the period 1895 to 1904. He played a prominent role in securing passage in 1896 of a law that guaranteed payment of Argentina's foreign debt. He received many offers to run for president in the 1898 presidential election, but rejected them.

In 1904 he traveled to the United States, where he witnessed the accession to power of president Theodore Roosevelt. Pellegrini recounted the experiences of that trip in six letters that later appeared in the newspaper La Nación, in which, among other things, he spoke of strengthening relations with the North American country.

==== The anti-Roca movement ====
The political alliance between Carlos Pellegrini and Julio Argentino Roca weakened in July 1901, although it did not disappear entirely, because of differences over a financial project. The break occurred when Roca, during his second government, asked Pellegrini to draft a legislative initiative for the consolidation of the public debt of 392 million gold pesos into a single loan of 453 million gold pesos. Pellegrini drafted a bill to unify the external public debt through a single loan at 4% annual interest and 0.5% amortization, over the long term, with obligations guaranteed by customs revenues. The proposal obtained half-sanction in the Senate. But the project met with strong rejection in public opinion; an address by José Terry at the Faculty of Law triggered street disturbances at the beginning of 1901, and the government ended up declaring a state of siege. For several days there were disturbances in the city center and demonstrations dispersed by police; a protest also gathered in front of Pellegrini's own house, which was stoned. Roca ultimately withdrew the bill without Pellegrini's consent, an action that angered the senator to the point of severing personal relations with the president, though he still remained within the National Autonomist Party.

Beginning in July 1902, a division arose in the Argentine Republic's PAN over the succession to president Julio A. Roca. The "convention of notables", established from 1903 as the informal body for selecting the presidential candidate of the ruling party, fractured over the failure to fulfill the commitment to nominate former president Carlos Pellegrini and Roca's decision to promote the lawyer Manuel Quintana in the 1904 election. From then until his death, Pellegrini demanded a law guaranteeing deep electoral reform in order to end fraud and promote civic freedoms.

Thus two political expressions emerged within conservative ideology: the "national autonomists" or Roquistas, with their uncompromising policy of maintaining electoral fraud, and the "autonomists" or Pellegrinistas, sectors split off from the PAN influenced by the radical revolutions, anarchist attacks, and workers' strikes. One of the main concerns of the Pellegrinistas was to transfer protests from the streets to parliament by giving political space to the new social actors. To do so it was necessary to create representational space for the main opposition party, the Radical Civic Union, but also for the moderate Socialist Party. In that way, the two major emerging social forces of the period — workerism and anarchism — would be weakened.

When the split in the PAN occurred and the candidacy of Manuel Quintana was confirmed on 12 October 1903, Sáenz Peña organized a banquet in Pellegrini's honor two days later at the Café de París. There, the former president announced the reasons for the new anti-Roca political movement: "The political party to which we belonged has disappeared, replaced by a single head that thinks, a will that decides, a voice that orders, an elector that chooses".

In that context, the autonomists took part in the national senatorial elections for the City of Buenos Aires on 6 March 1904. Sáenz Peña withdrew his candidacy and Carlos Pellegrini stood in his place against the government deputy Benito Villanueva, president of the Capital Committee of the National Autonomist Party, and Emilio Mitre, candidate of the Republican Party. The government victory was overwhelming: Villanueva won with 11,516 votes and 28 electors, followed by Pellegrini with 9,075 votes and 6 electors, and Mitre with 7,547 votes and 10 electors. Quintana, meanwhile, obtained a majority of electors on 10 April, and in the supplementary elections for vacant deputy seats Pellegrini won comfortably on 16 June 1905, returning to the Chamber of Deputies after twenty-eight years.

During his final years, Pellegrini attempted to adapt the PAN to the political changes taking place in the country. To achieve this, he became convinced that it was necessary to carry out a reform of electoral practices. But his early death, in Buenos Aires, on 17 July 1906 at the age of 59, though not surprising to his friends and colleagues because of the deterioration of his health, had a profound national impact due to the expectations generated around the need for electoral reform, and created a political vacuum that would later be filled by Roque Sáenz Peña, considered his political heir, who put forward the secret-ballot electoral reform that would bring Hipólito Yrigoyen to the presidency in 1916. Sáenz Peña, however, died in 1914.

==== Deputy again (1906) ====
Amid the institutional fluctuations of the presidential politics of Manuel Quintana and the radical revolution of 1905, the enemies of Julio A. Roca outnumbered his friends and allies. Thus, in 1906, he was elected National Representative in the lower house in the election of 11 March 1906, again under the complete-list system: the Popular Concentration coalition defeated the government slate amid scandals and protests over vote-buying. It was a political front of autonomists, Mitristas, the conservative Benito Villanueva and Bernardista radicals that placed Pellegrini, Emilio Mitre, Roque Sáenz Peña and Ernesto Tornquist in the leading positions.

He took the seat as legislator that he had won. In the session of 9 May 1906, he delivered a fiery speech while challenging the credentials of the deputies elected by the Buenos Aires government party:

I arrive with fewer illusions, with less enthusiasm, with more experience. I bring a weary machine because the journey has been long and the road often rough and thorny. But I come with the same blind faith in the future of my country and the same determination to serve it as far as my strength allows.

=== Death ===
On 9 January 1906 Bartolomé Mitre died in his native city of Buenos Aires. Although he had announced his retirement from politics on turning 80, he still retained a certain influence, at least in the Capital and Buenos Aires Province; and on 12 March, less than twenty-four hours after the defeat of the government in the Capital, president Manuel Quintana died. In that context, Carlos Pellegrini had a chance to become the "natural" candidate of the reformist conservatives for the presidency in 1910, because of the national prestige he had acquired in his brief presidency, his knowledge of public finances, his position on reform of the electoral system, and his close political ties with the new president of the Republic, José Figueroa Alcorta.

He is buried in La Recoleta Cemetery.

Political offices
Preceded by Francisco Bernabé Madero	Vice President of Argentina; 1886–1890	Succeeded by José Evaristo Uriburu
Preceded by Miguel Juárez Celman	President of Argentina; 1890–1892	Succeeded by Luis Sáenz Peña
