= Escuela Superior de Guerra (Argentina) =

Argentine Army War College

Coordinates: 34°34′24″S 58°26′03″W

The War College Lieutenant General Luis María Campos (Spanish: Escuela Superior de Guerra Teniente General Luis María Campos) is the university and staff college of the Armed Forces of the Argentine Republic. It was founded by Lt Gen Luis María Campos and opened in 1900.

In the late 20th century, as Argentina modernized its Army education system, the War College redesigned its structure to accommodate civilian students. By 2019, the institution had enrolled over 1,500 civilian students. The institution offers academic workshops, university extension courses such as Strategic Intelligence, and crisis management simulation events with participants from different universities.
