= Roque Sáenz Peña =

12th President of Argentina

Roque Sáenz-Peña
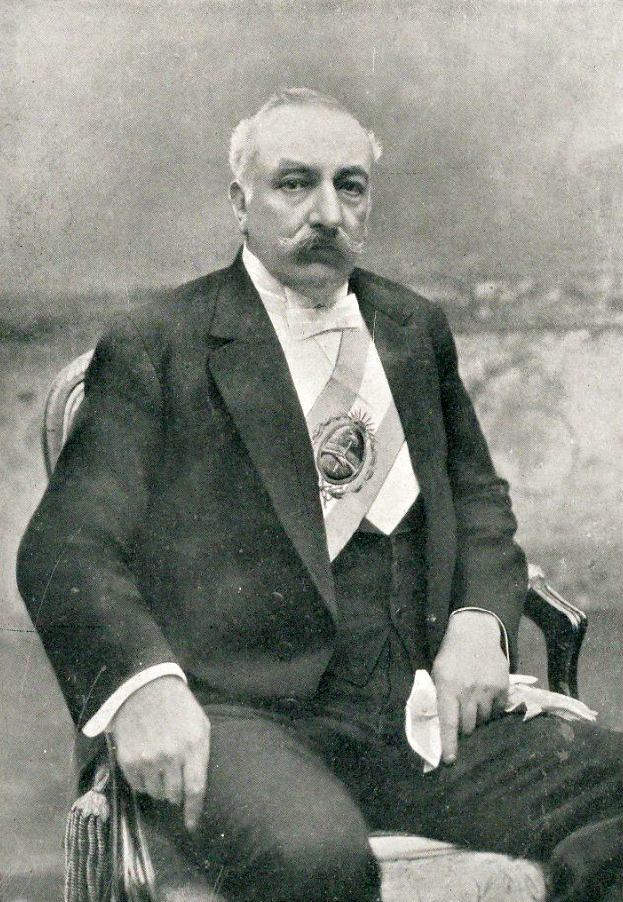

17th President of Argentina
- In office 12 October 1910 – 9 August 1914
- Vice President: Victorino de la Plaza
- Preceded by: José Figueroa Alcorta
- Succeeded by: Victorino de la Plaza

Minister of Foreign Affairs and Worship
- In office 30 June 1890 – 4 August 1890
- President: Miguel Juárez Celman
- Preceded by: Amancio Alcorta
- Succeeded by: Eduardo Costa

Personal details
- Born: Roque José Antonio del Sagrado Corazón de Jesús Sáenz-Peña; 19 March 1851 Buenos Aires, Argentine Confederation
- Died: 9 August 1914 (aged 63) Buenos Aires, Argentina
- Resting place: La Recoleta Cemetery, Buenos Aires
- Party: National Autonomist Party
- Spouse: Rosa Isidora González (m. 1887)
- Children: Rosa Sáenz-Peña; Luis Roque Sáenz-Peña
- Parent(s): Luis Sáenz-Peña; Cipriana du Cos de La Hitte
- Education: University of Buenos Aires
- Profession: Lawyer

Military service
- Allegiance: Argentina; Peru
- Branch/service: Argentine Army; Peruvian Army
- Rank: Brigadier General (of Peru)
- Battles/wars: Revolution of 1874; War of the Pacific

Roque José Antonio del Sagrado Corazón de Jesús Sáenz-Peña Lahitte (19 March 1851 – 9 August 1914) was an Argentine politician and lawyer who served as President of Argentina from 12 October 1910 to his death in office on 9 August 1914. He was the son of former president Luis Sáenz-Peña. He was a candidate for an internal, modernist line within the National Autonomist Party.

He was responsible for passing Law 8871, known as "Sáenz-Peña Law", which greatly reformed the Argentine electoral system, making the vote secret, universal and compulsory for males over 18. This effectively ended the rule by electoral fraud of the conservative Argentine oligarchy, the Generation of '80, and paved the way for the rise of the Radical Civic Union in the first free elections of the country.

== Early life ==
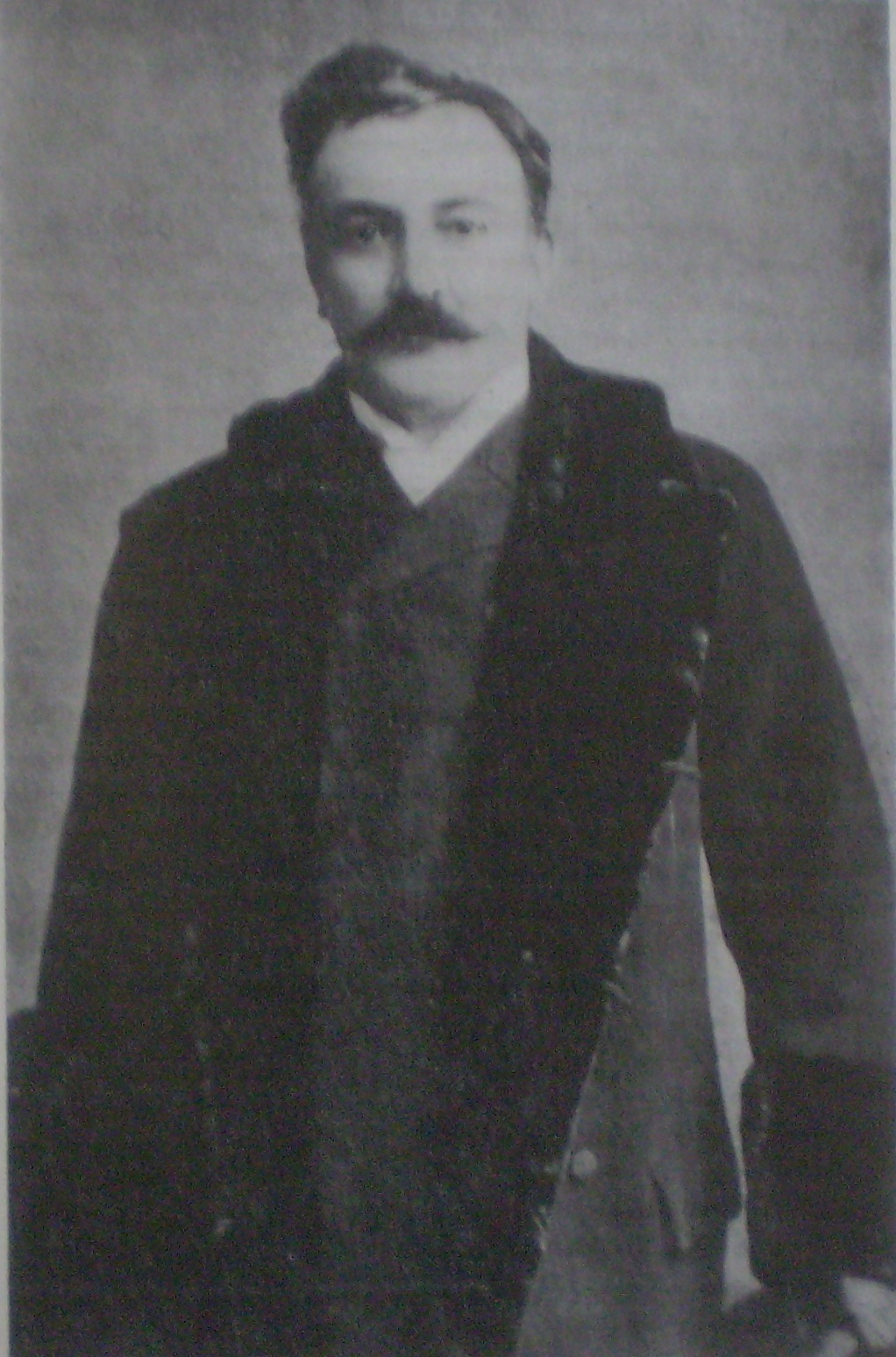
Photograph taken on his wedding day.

Roque Sáenz-Peña was the son of Luis Sáenz-Peña and Cipriana du Cos de La Hitte. He came from a family of supporters of Rosas: his paternal and maternal grandparents, Roque Julián Sáenz-Peña and Eduardo du Cos de La Hitte, had been deputies of the Legislature during his government. After the defeat of Rosas in the Battle of Caseros, the federal tradition of the grandparents and the father, who did not change their convictions, kept them away from public service. He completed his secondary studies at the National School of Buenos Aires, under the direction of Amadeo Jacques. In 1875 he graduated as a doctor of law, with a thesis on "Legal status of foundlings."

During the Revolution of 1874 he defended the authorities of the nation as Captain of Regiment, under the command of Luis María Campos. After the revolution, he was promoted to Second Commander of National Guards, but requested to be relieved of the ranks. Opponent of Bartolomé Mitre, he was a member of the Autonomist Party headed by Adolfo Alsina and in 1876 he was elected to a Deputy seat in the Legislature of the Province of Buenos Aires. He came to serve as president of the body at the age of 26, thus being one of the youngest presidents of the House. In 1877 he founded the Republican Party, together with Leandro Alem, Aristóbulo del Valle, Hipólito Yrigoyen, Lucio Vicente López, Pedro Goyena, José Manuel Estrada and Francisco Uriburu.

In 1878, as a result of the dissidents produced within the autonomism due to the conciliation policy initiated by President Nicolás Avellaneda to which Sáenz-Peña was opposed, he resigned from his position and ended up temporarily abandoning politics.

On 4 February 1887, he married Rosa Isidora González, daughter of Mendoza's politician Lucas González and Rosa Delgado, in the Basilica of Our Lady of Pilar (Buenos Aires).

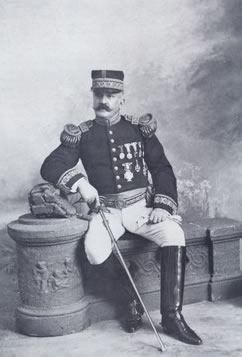
Sáenz-Peña in military uniform.

=== War of the Pacific ===
The War of the Pacific (La Guerra del Pacífico) pitted Chile against an allied Bolivia and Peru. Later, Argentina not joined the alliance. The dispute was over territory on the Pacific coast that had never been resolved, specifically control of a part of the Atacama Desert. The area contained high amounts of sodium nitrate which is a valuable mineral resource necessarily to produce potassium nitrate, an important fertilizer.

During the war, Sáenz-Peña left Argentina to fight with the Peruvian Army. His main motivation was to show solidarity, but other says it was to escape Buenos Aires due to an unrequited love affair. After his superior officers had been killed in the Battle of Arica he assumed their roles and commanded a very weak Peruvian division. Sáenz Peña was captured after the Peruvians' defeat at the battle and imprisoned briefly by the Chileans.

== Rise to power ==
When Sáenz Peña returned to Buenos Aires he was appointed sub-secretary of the Ministry of Foreign Relations under Minister of Foreign Relations Bernardo de Irigoyen in 1880. He soon left politics only to return in 1887 when he accepted the ministership to Uruguay. He represented Argentina at the 1888 Montevideo Congress. Sáenz Peña held firm to his legal and political doctrines and definitively stated that Argentine was immune to any action taken by the assembly.

Along with Manuel Quintana, Sáenz Peña represented Argentina in the first Pan American Conference in 1889. The two delegates made a 40-day journey to New York and then a four-day trip to Washington for the meeting that was taking placed in the State Department building. The Argentine delegation boycotted the opening meeting over, as they saw it, a violation of diplomatic custom. Custom requires a delegate from an invited country to preside over the conference, but the U.S. Secretary of State was elected to be the permanent chair of the conference.

The delegates attended the second session. Throughout the conference Sáenz Peña advocated against an American free trade area. Nevertheless, the United States and twelve nations voted for a “recommendation to work for inter-American reciprocity treaties.” Only Argentina, Chile, and Bolivia voted against it.

During Sáenz Peña's tenure as foreign minister, he traveled the world and effectively argued for policies that benefited Argentina. He also performed traditional ceremonial duties, like in 1906 when he attended the wedding of King Alfonso XIII of Spain. He worked with the Italian government to increase trade while providing them with official cables from Argentina telling of the economic developments within the country. He distributed these cables to other European governments and businessmen as well. Before his presidency, Sáenz Peña served as ambassador to Spain (1906–1907) and Italy (1907–1910).

== Presidency ==
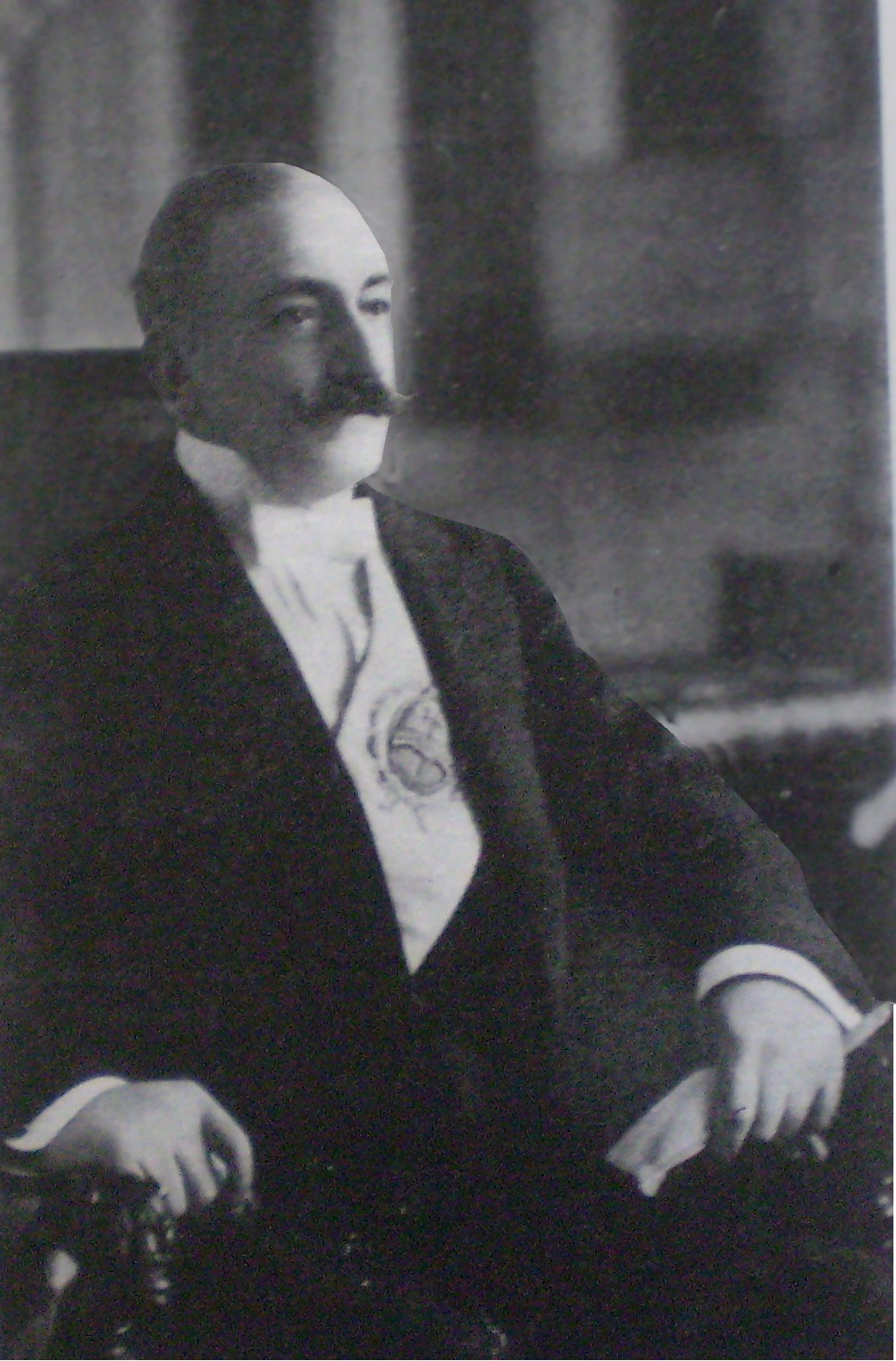
Sáenz Peña with the presidential sash

The electoral act that led Roque Sáenz Peña to the presidency of Argentina took place on 13 March 1910, with a large number of irregularities common at that time. The new president had not even participated in the electoral campaign: he was the Argentine ambassador to Italy. A single list of elector candidates participated in the elections, of which ten - out of 273 - did not vote for Sáenz Peña.

Days before assuming the presidency, Sáenz Peña met with President Figueroa Alcorta and with the leader of the opposition, Hipólito Yrigoyen. In this last interview, the radical leader promised to abandon the revolutionary path, and Sáenz Peña to promulgate an electoral law that would modernize the elections and prevent electoral fraud. Yrigoyen requested the intervention of the provinces to prevent their governors from interfering with said process, Sáenz Peña refused but allowed radicalism to be part of the government.

During his presidency, in 1912, a National Department of Labor was established. Legislation was introduced the following year authorizing loans for the building of housing for public employees, and in 1914 a law was passed exempting construction firms under contract (as noted by one study) “to build working-class housing from paying customs duties on imported construction materials.”.

=== Governance management ===
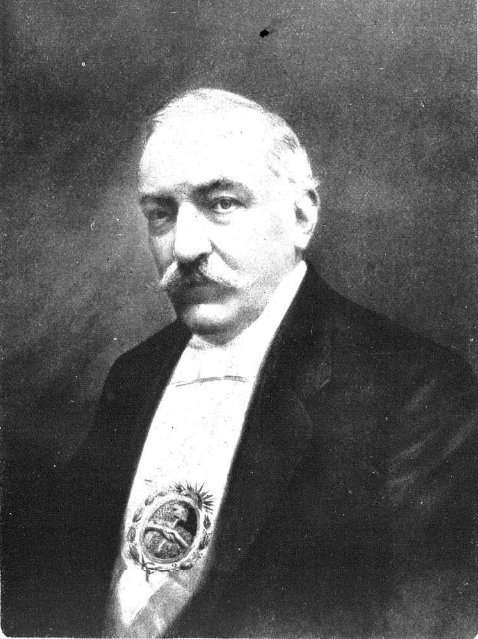
Portrait of Sáenz Peña after assuming the presidency

On 12 October 1910, Roque Sáenz Peña assumed the presidency of Argentina. In his first inaugural address he declared: “My international policy if known to you. It will be friendship for Europe and fraternity for America.” He came into power without the support of his own party, like his father. Sáenz Peña was elected while tensions were high in 1910 while promising electoral reform to curb the power of the oligarchy and to prevent a revolution.

In 1912 - at the initiative of the Minister of Agriculture, Ezequiel Ramos Mexía - Law 5,599, on the Promotion of National Territories, was enacted. Most of the national territories had the vast majority of their population concentrated on their maritime or fluvial coastline; For this reason, the law provided - and to a great extent succeeded - the construction of a large number of railway branches, which would allow the establishment of its population towards the interior. Branches were built in the national territories of Chaco, Formosa, Río Negro, Chubut and Santa Cruz; and a railroad branch even reached Posadas, the capital of Misiones.

On 10 August 1912, he signed the decree for the creation of the Military Aviation School (EMA), together with G. Vélez, according to the official bulletin 692-2 part). In the same it was established that in the meantime there would be no military personnel trained in Aerostation and Aviation, the Technical Directorate would be in charge of the Argentine Aeroclub and the Military Directorate in charge of the Chief of the Argentine Army with the title of Director of the School of Military Aviation .

=== The cry of Alcorta ===
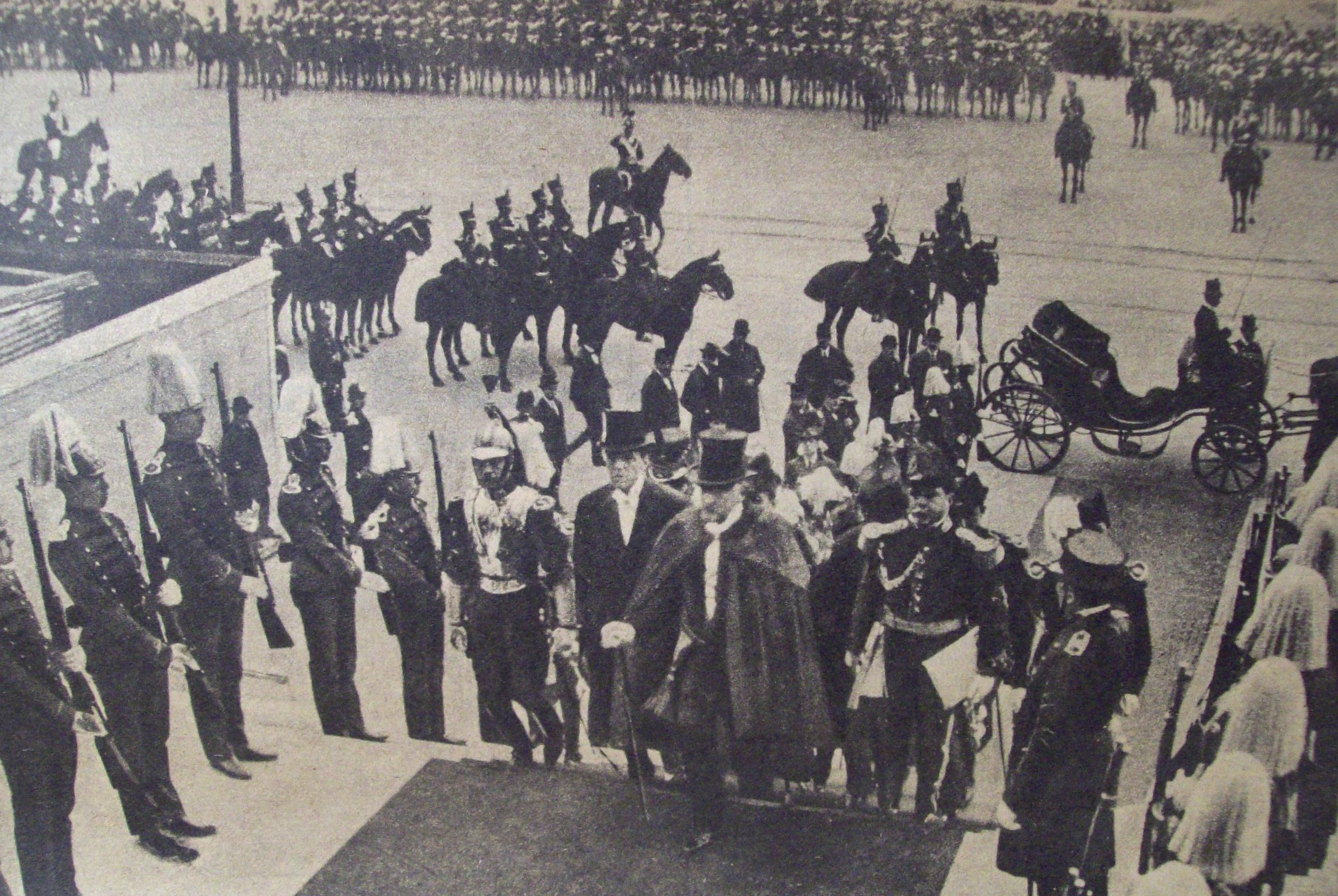
President Roque Sáenz Peña arrives at Congress in 1912

In June 1912 a great protest movement broke out among the tenant farmers against the worsening of the conditions of their contracts with the owners of the fields they worked, known as the Grito de Alcorta. It spread throughout the Pampas region and ended with a massive drop in rents. It marked the irruption of a portion of the rural middle class, formed by the farmers, in the national politics of the 20th century. But at the same time, a gradual trend towards the owners' own administration of the fields began, who began to consider the presence of tenants dangerous.

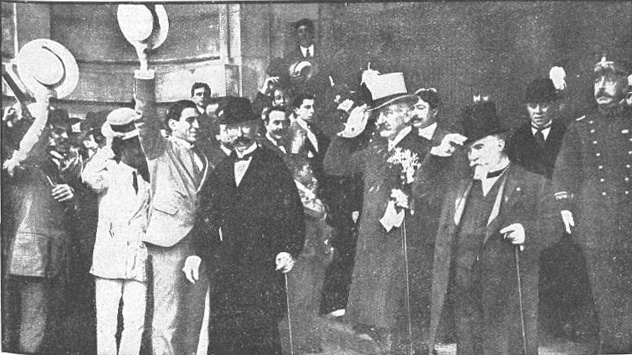
President Roque Sáenz Peña with Governor José Arias, 1912

=== The Sáenz Peña Law ===
Sáenz Peña was a convinced democrat; He thought that, freed from professional politicians, the people would elect the best for their government. He was also concerned about the social question, that is, about the possibility that - apart from politics - the workers could adhere to anarchism or socialism. Finally, he feared that the huge proportion of the foreign population, who did not participate in any way in politics, could fall into maximalist positions or remain a foreign body in society. For all these reasons he supported political reform based on universal and free voting.

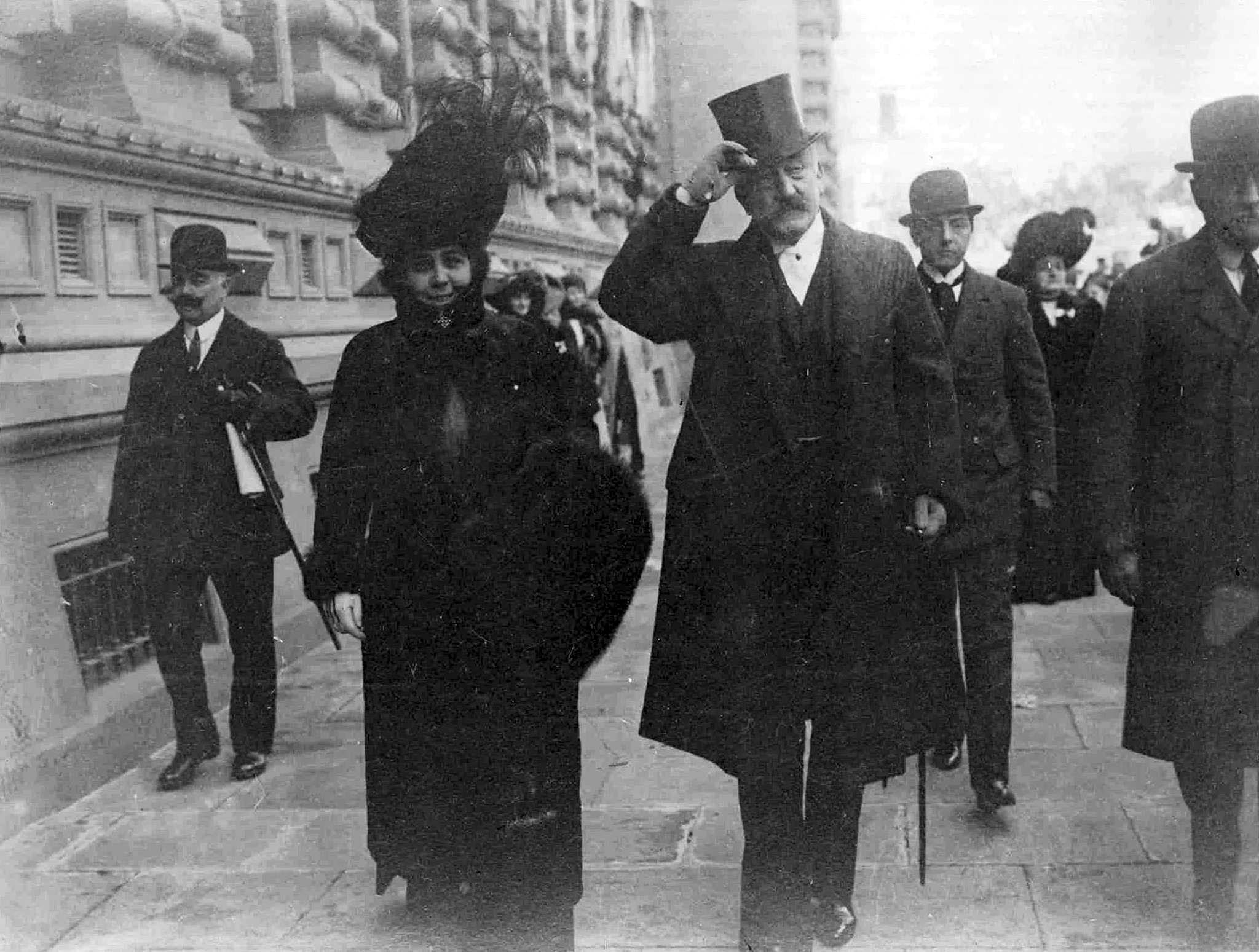
President Roque Sáenz Peña with his wife

Given the history of pressure on the voters - who voted aloud - the only possibility of electoral freedom was secret suffrage, through ballots written in sealed envelopes. And to ensure that no one was prevented from voting, he also made it universal and mandatory. The military registry would be used as the electoral roll. On the other hand, the participation of the population in the elections was very low, barely exceeding 20% of potential voters.

Sáenz Peña presented the project in Congress with these words: "I have told my country all my thoughts, my convictions and my hopes. May my country listen to the word and the advice of its first president, let the people vote."

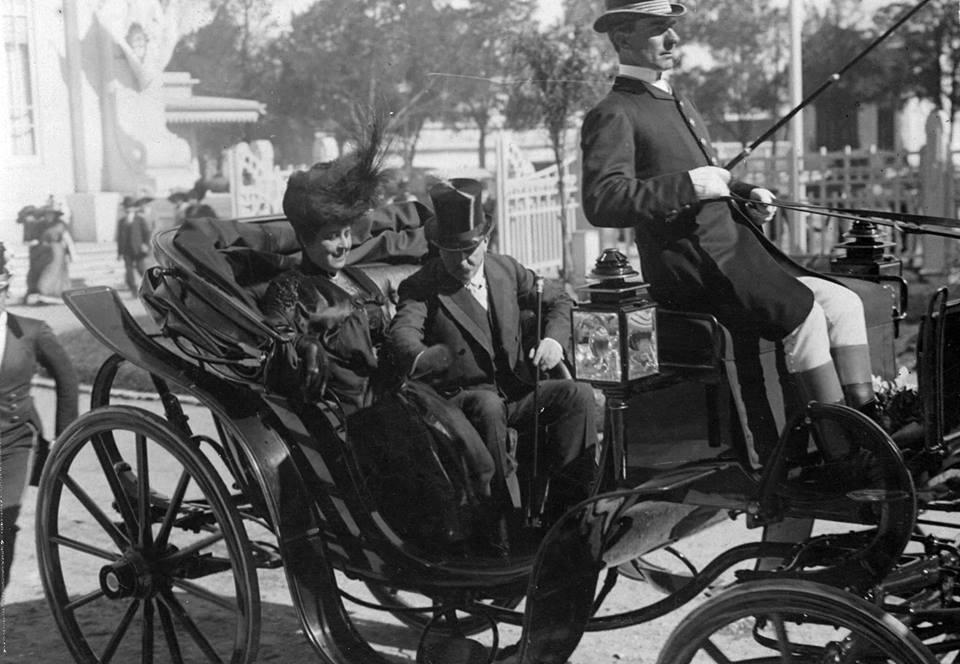
Roque Sáenz Peña and his wife getting out of a carriage

The person in charge of designing the project and defending it in Congress was the Minister of the Interior, the Catholic Indalecio Gómez. He had to face stiff resistance from conservative deputies, whose privileges were clearly threatened by the reform, and who did not know any other way of doing politics. Thus, many legislators from the conservative sectors, still not openly opposing it, obstruct the reform. After a month of discussion in the Chamber of Deputies and a week in the Senate, the Sáenz Peña Law was approved and promulgated on 13 February 1912.

The law was a great advance in its time since it allowed large masses of the population to participate in the electoral act, although it was still far from being completely universal: women and foreigners - who at that time were a large part of society - still had no right to vote. Although they did not vote, they were instead taken into account when determining the population of the districts and the number of deputies that could be elected by each one.

The first test of the Law in operation was in a provincial election: the Province of Santa Fe was intervened by the government, which ordered the holding of the governor's elections in accordance with the Sáenz Peña Law; the UCR abandoned abstentionism and participated, achieving victory. Shortly after, he obtained a new victory in the deputy elections in the City of Buenos Aires, in an election in which popular participation amounted to 62.85% of the electoral roll; the Socialist Party also obtained a notable growth in them.

== Death ==
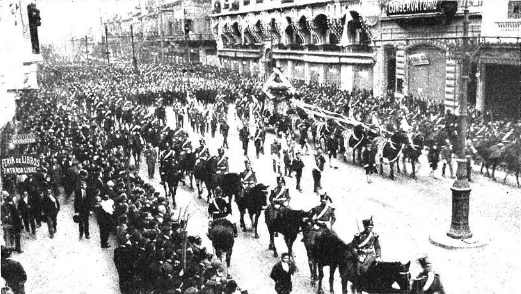
Roque Sáenz Peña's funeral

From the time of the assumption of Roque Sáenz Peña as president, his health was not good, but it worsened significantly from the year 1913. The version that circulated at the time was that the president suffered the neurological consequences of syphilis that he would have been infected during the War of the Pacific. In early October 1913, he delegated the government on his Vice-President Victorino de la Plaza, as he took a leave of absence.

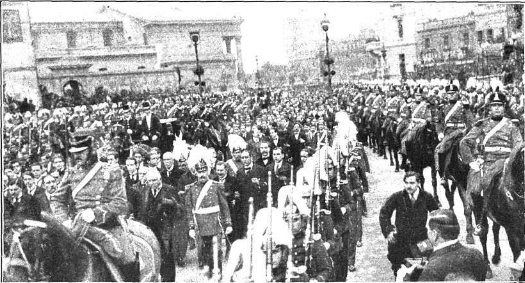
Roque Sáenz Peña's funeral

Sáenz Peña was the only president who lived in the Casa Rosada because of his sensitive health that prevented him from traveling with his cart from home. He adopted a sector as his home and had heating, rugs, rocking chairs and stained glass installed. During the last days of his life, Sáenz Peña remarked “I have lost almost all my friends, but I have governed for the Republic.”

He died 3 years and 301 days after assuming the presidency, on 9 August 1914. He was buried the next day in the Recoleta Cemetery in Buenos Aires.

=== Legacy ===
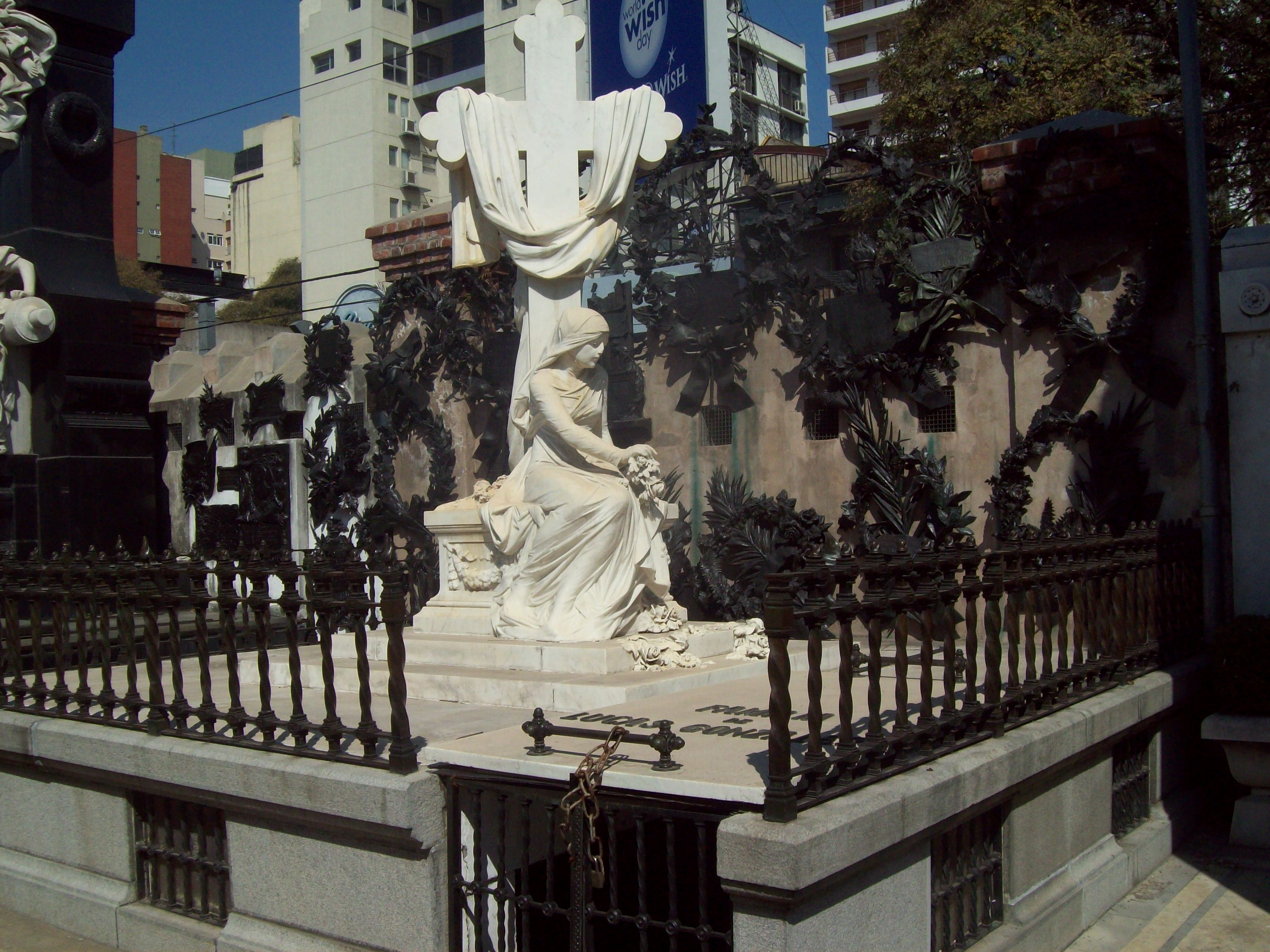
Tomb of Roque Sáenz Peña

Sáenz Peña is known today for his electoral reform and his fierce determination to protect the interests of Argentina abroad. In Argentina, mainly in Buenos Aires, he is also very honored, having streets, avenues and towns with his name. An example of this is:

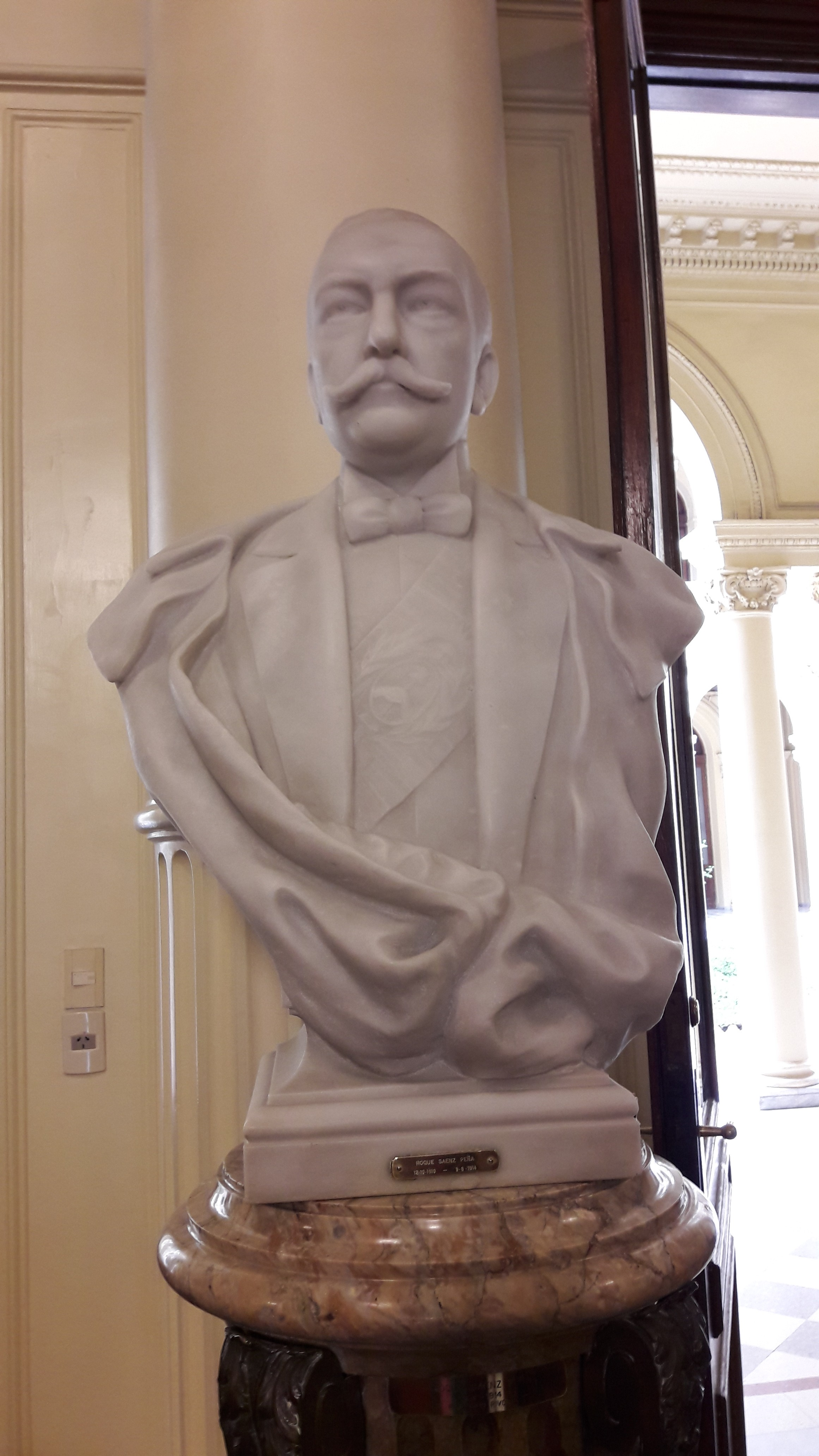
Bust that roque Sáenz peña in the room of the busts of the Casa Rosada

- The President Roque Sáenz Peña Avenue in Buenos Aires.
- The subway station Sáenz Peña in Buenos Aires, Province.
- City Presidencia Roque Sáenz Peña in Chaco.

among others.

The figure of Roque Sáenz Peña -as a soldier- is very remembered in Peru, where many cities in this country have a street with the name of Sáenz Peña and there are monuments to his memory. In Rio de Janeiro, his name is remembered in Plaza Sáenz Peña.

== Honours ==
=== Decorations ===
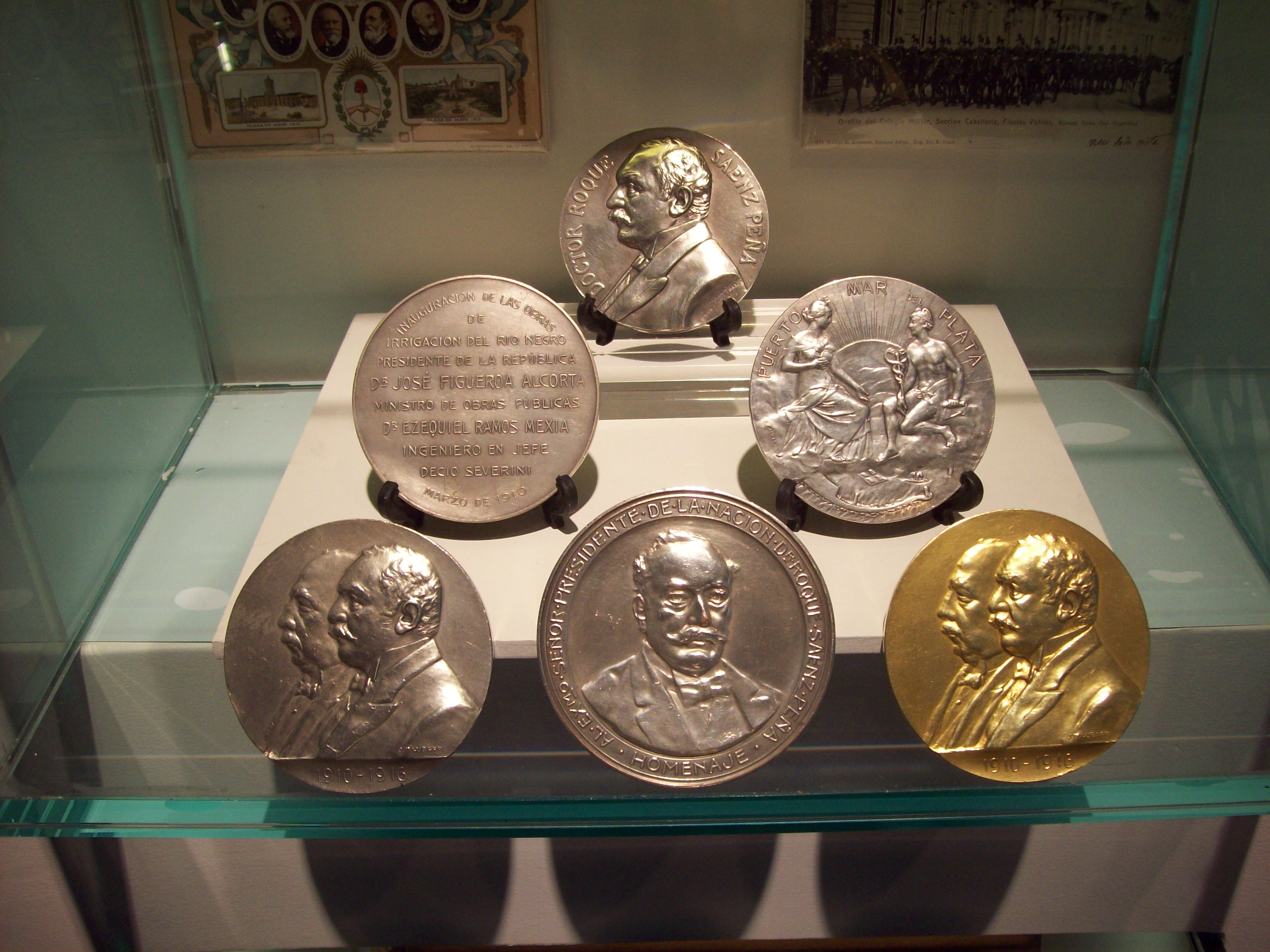
Roque Saenz Peña's medals

- France:
  - Grand Cross of the Legion of Honour (6 May 1913)

== Bibliography ==
- Botana, Natalio R., Ezequiel Gallo, and Ian Barnett. 2013. Liberal Thought In Argentina, 1837-1940. 1st ed. Indianapolis: Liberty Fund.
- Carpenter, Frank G. (9 February 1890). "The All-Americans.: Members of the International Congress". Los Angeles Times. p. 9. ProQuest 163491506.
- Castro, Martín O (2009). "Los Católicos En El Juego Político Conservador De Comienzos Del Siglo XX (1907-1912)". Desarrollo Económico. 49 (193): 31–60.
- Cibotti, Ema. 2011. Historias Mínimas De Nuestra Historia. 1st ed. Buenos Aires: Aguilar, Alfaguara, Altea, Taurus.
- McSpadden, Joseph Walker. 1912. Official Digest Of The World: American Statesman's Year-Book, A Supplement To All Encyclopedias, Embracing The Latest Statistics, Records, And Current History Of Every State And Current History Of Every State And Country. P.F. Collier & Son.
- "Presidencia De Roque Saenz Peña". 2017. Accessed 1 March. http://www.todo-argentina.net/historia/gen80/SaenzPena(1910-1916)/index.html.
- "Revolución De 1874". 2017. Es.Wikipedia.Org. https://es.wikipedia.org/wiki/Revolución_de_1874.
- Rock, David. 1985. Argentina, 1516-1982. 1st ed. Berkeley: University of California Press.
- "Roque Sáenz Peña". 2017. Britannica Academic. Encyclopædia Britannica.
- "Roque Sáenz Peña". 2017. Biografías Y Vidas. La Enciclopedia Biografía en Línea.
- The Editors of Encyclopædia Britannica. 2007. "War Of The Pacific". Encyclopædia Britannica. Encyclopædia Britannica, inc.

Political offices
Preceded by Amancio Alcorta	Minister of Foreign Affairs and Worship; 1890	Succeeded by Eduardo Costa
Preceded by José Figueroa	President of Argentina; 1910–1914	Succeeded by Victorino de la Plaza
