= María Josefa Álvarez de Arenales =

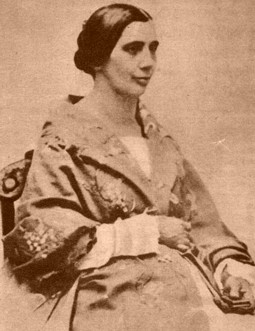
- Born: December 1, 1807; Salta, Viceroyalty of the Rio de la Plata
- Died: June 15, 1890 (aged 82); Buenos Aires, Argentina
- Occupation: Rebel
- Known for: Funding Argentine independence movement
- Spouse: Evaristo de Uriburu
- Children: Josefa Uriburu, José Evaristo Uriburu, Napoleón Uriburu

María Josefa Álvarez de Arenales (December 1, 1807 in Salta — June 15, 1890 in Buenos Aires) was a patriot who, at a young age, contributed financially to the Argentine War of Independence. She is considered one of the Patricias Argentinas. She married her second cousin, Colonel Evaristo de Uriburu, with whom she had many children; among them was José Evaristo Uriburu, who would become the President of Argentina. Her grandson, General José Félix Uriburu, was later the de facto president of the republic.

== Family ==
According to the historian and genealogist Carlos Ibarguren, she was a descendant of the Spanish colonizer Domingo Martínez de Irala. Her ancestors had remote Guaraní mestizo origin, an origin she shared with many heroes of the Argentine independence movement.

She was the daughter of Serafina de González Hoyos and the general Juan Antonio Álvarez de Arenales.

Included among her children was the general Napoleón Uriburu, who participated in the Argentine Civil Wars, the Paraguayan War, the Conquest of the Desert, and the conquest of Chaco; he was also the governor of the Chaco and Formosa territories.

== War of Independence ==
During the Argentine War of Independence, Álvarez de Arenales donated her jewels and savings to aid the Argentine patriots. As a result, José de San Martín decorated her with a medal and band, upon which "To patriotism" was inscribed. She also received a paper that explained that the medal had been granted "to honor the hearts of the ladies who have felt the misfortunes of the country."

== Later life and death ==
She accompanied her father in exile, where she met her husband; she later returned with her husband to her home country. During her husband's retirement, she finally settled with her family in Buenos Aires, where in 1874 her father's skull was given to her. The skull was kept by her family until 1959, when it was placed in the Pantheon of Salta.

She died in Buenos Aires on June 15, 1890. Her daughter, Josefa Uriburu de Girondo, donated to Salta funds for the construction of a tuberculosis hospital; the hospital was named for Álvarez de Arenales.
