= Luis Sáenz Peña =

7th President of Argentina (1822–1907)

Luis Sáenz-Peña
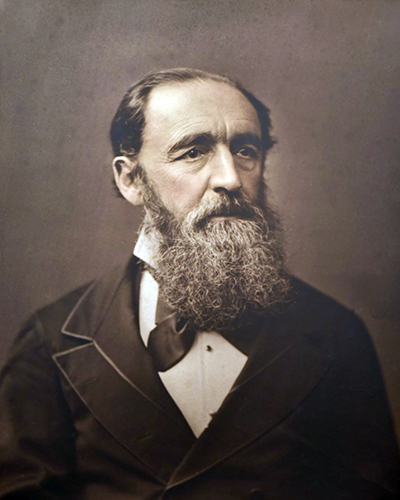

12th President of Argentina
- In office 12 October 1892 – 23 January 1895
- Vice President: José E. Uriburu
- Preceded by: Carlos Pellegrini
- Succeeded by: José E. Uriburu

Vice-Governor of Buenos Aires Province
- In office 1 May 1875 – 1 May 1878
- Governor: Carlos Casares
- Preceded by: Creation of the position
- Succeeded by: José María Moreno

President of the Argentine Chamber of Deputies
- In office 25 April 1874 – 25 April 1875
- Preceded by: Octavio Garrigós
- Succeeded by: Bernardo de Irigoyen

Personal details
- Born: Luis Sáenz-Peña y Dávila; 2 April 1822 Buenos Aires, Argentina
- Died: 4 December 1907 (aged 85) Buenos Aires, Argentina
- Resting place: La Recoleta Cemetery; Buenos Aires, Argentina
- Party: National Autonomist Party
- Spouse: Cipriana du Cos de La Hitte
- Children: Roque Sáenz Peña
- Parent(s): Roque Julián Sáenz-Peña; María Luisa Dávila
- Education: University of Buenos Aires
- Profession: Lawyer

Luis Sáenz-Peña (2 April 1822 – 4 December 1907) was a lawyer and President of Argentina. He was the father of president Roque Sáenz Peña.

== Biography ==
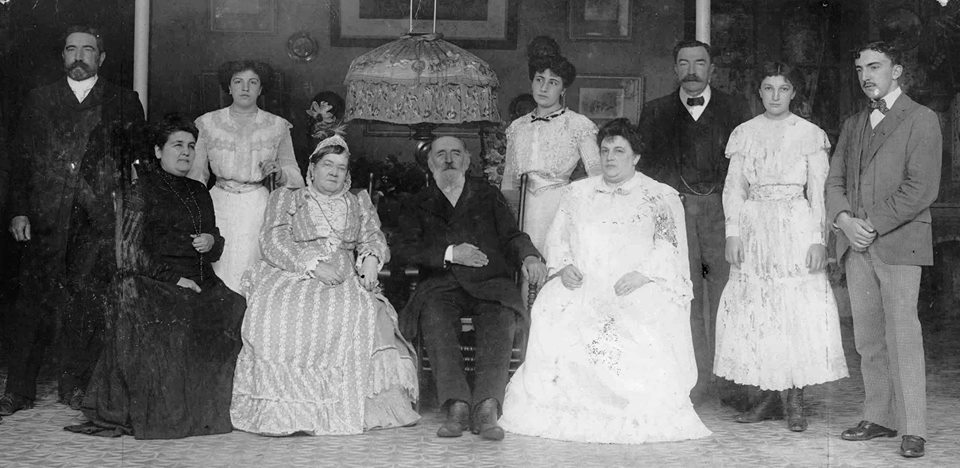
82nd birthday of Sáenz-Peña in 1904, with his son, Roque, and other family members.

Luis Saenz-Peña was born on 2 April 1822 to Roque Julián Sáenz-Peña and María Luisa Dávila.

He graduated in law from the University of Buenos Aires and participated in the constitutional assembly of 1860. He was a number of times a national deputy and senator. In 1882, he occupied a seat on the Supreme Court of the Province of Buenos Aires. Later he was employed as president of the Provincial Bank, director of the Academy of Jurisprudence, and had a seat in the General Council of Education.

On 18 November 1848, he married Cipriana du Cos de La Hitte (born 6 December 1829, Montevideo, Uruguay - died 23 October 1916) in the Church of Saint Ignatius, in Buenos Aires.

=== Political office ===
In 1882, he served as a member of the Supreme Court of the Province of Buenos Aires. Later, he served as president of the Bank of the Province of Buenos Aires. He was also several times a national deputy and senator.

== Presidency ==
Luis Sáenz-Peña, a prominent Catholic leader, was anointed as a transitional president, after an agreement between Julio Argentino Roca's and Bartolome Mitre's factions that prevented the electoral participation of the brand new U.C.R.

On 12 October 1892, Sáenz-Peña was inaugurated president of the country. He began his mandate convinced that his mission was to finish getting out of the Panic of 1890. He decided not to contract new debts, and personally renegotiated the existing ones in London: the financial situation forced the bankers to accept the conditions imposed by the Minister of Finance, Juan José Romero, who got some cuts in the capital and a somewhat longer term. By mid-1893, the crisis could be considered over.

During his tenure, the Ministry of Public Works managed to expand the railway network, to the point that all provincial capitals — except La Rioja — were linked by rails. The cities of Buenos Aires, Rosario and Santa Fe finished their ports, and the capital opened the Avenida de Mayo, which for more than half a century would be the show window of the great city.

In 1893, Congress approved the creation of the National Charity Lottery, today the National Lottery, which became active in 1894.

In 1894, Law 1,894 was enacted, which yielded large portions of the Chaco National Territory to neighboring provinces, especially benefiting the Province of Santa Fe.

== Revolution and resignation ==
In 1895, the political situation became more unstable every day, due to the evident incapacity of the president; Sáenz-Peña changed his entire cabinet of ministers several times, unsuccessfully seeking to avoid journalistic criticism.

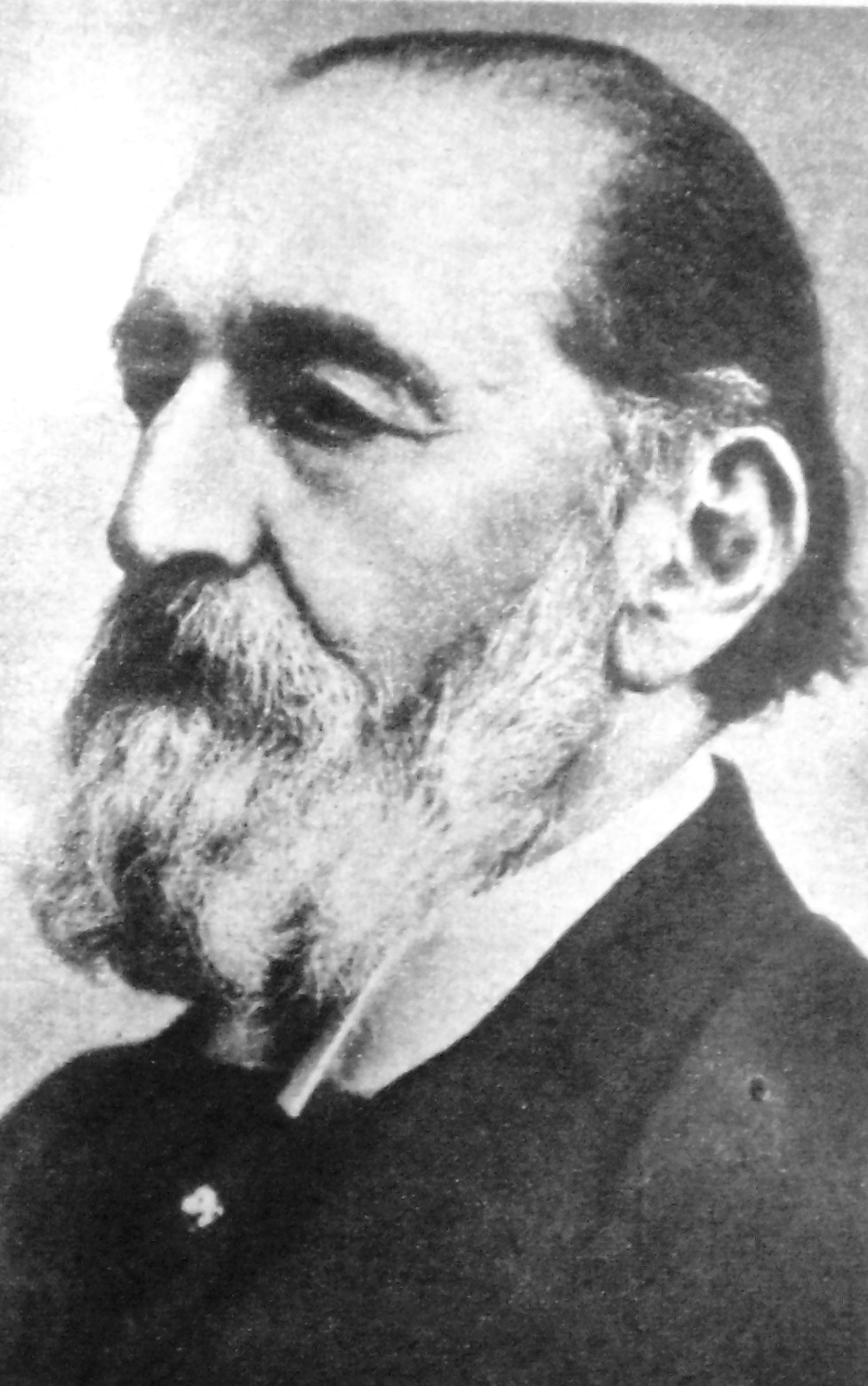
image of Luis Sáenz-Peña.

The situation spread to the interior provinces, where on several occasions the governments were overthrown, thus increasing instability. Sáenz-Peña, increasingly disoriented, tried all possible alliances, and finally - before the imminence of a radical revolution - appointed Aristóbulo del Valle Minister of War and Navy. This convinced him to disarm the National Guards, with the apparent aim of avoiding new revolutions, but a few days later the radical revolution broke out.

Sáenz-Peña no longer controlled his ministers, who ruled according to Roca and Pellegrini's instructions. In mid-January 1895, all of them submitted their resignations en masse. Sáenz-Peña submitted his resignation on 22 January, which was received with relief by the public opinion. The government passed into the hands of José Evaristo Uriburu, who completed the term ending in 1898.

== Death ==
He died in Buenos Aires on December 4, 1907, at the age of 85. He is buried in the Recoleta Cemetery.

Political offices
Preceded by Carlos Pellegrini	President of Argentina; 1892–1895	Succeeded by José Evaristo Uriburu
