= José Evaristo Uriburu =

8th President of Argentina

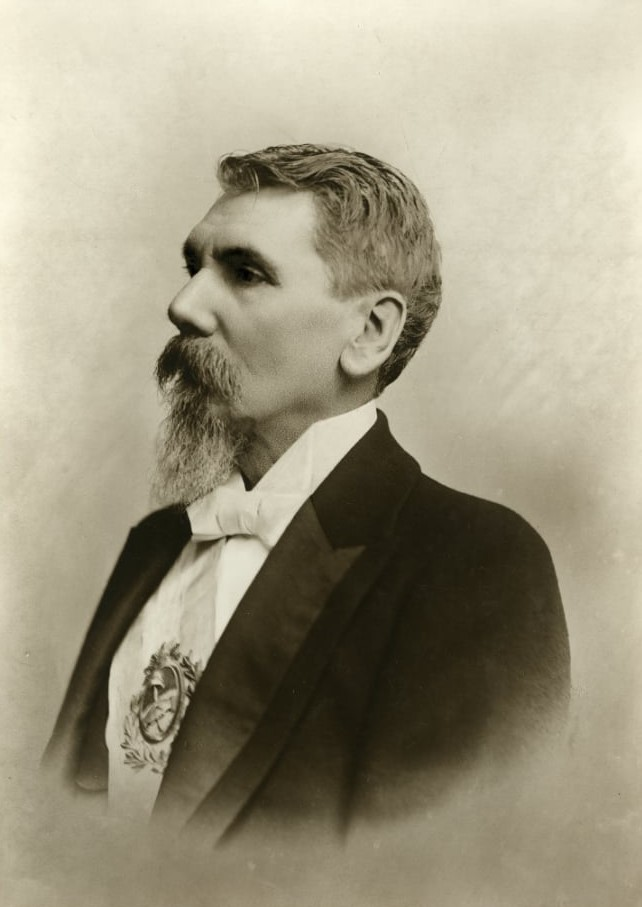

13th President of Argentina
- In office 24 January 1895 – 11 October 1898
- Preceded by: Luis Sáenz Peña
- Succeeded by: Julio A. Roca

8th Vice President of Argentina
- In office 12 October 1892 – 23 January 1895
- President: Luis Sáenz Peña
- Preceded by: Carlos Pellegrini
- Succeeded by: Norberto Quirno Costa

Personal details
- Born: 19 November 1831 Salta
- Died: 23 October 1914 (aged 82) Buenos Aires
- Party: National Autonomist Party
- Other political affiliations: Republican Party
- Spouse(s): Virginia Uriburu; Leonor Tezanos Pinto
- Relations: Evaristo de Uriburu (father); María Josefa Álvarez de Arenales (mother)
- Children: Rita, Sara, Jorge, Carlos and Virginia de Uriburu (with Virginia Uriburu); José Evaristo, Jr and Leonor de Uriburu (with Leonor Tezanos Pinto)
- Profession: Lawyer

José Félix Evaristo de Uriburu y Álvarez de Arenales (19 November 1831 – 23 October 1914) was President of Argentina from 23 January 1895 to 12 October 1898.

He was an adept diplomat; participating as arbiter on the peace negotiations on the War of the Pacific between Chile, Perú and Bolivia.

He was vice-president and became president of Argentina in 1895 when Luis Sáenz Peña resigned.

His son was José Evaristo Uriburu y Tezanos Pinto (1880–1956), Argentinian Ambassador in London in the 1920s, and father of Clarita de Uriburu, Cecil Beaton's model.

== Work in office as president ==
- Reformed the National Constitution in 1898.
- Created the National Lottery (Lotería Nacional de Beneficencia).
- Created the Museo Nacional de Bellas Artes Buenos Aires.
- Created the Otto Krause Technical School.

== Other offices held ==
- Federal Judge, Salta (1872–1874)
- National Deputy (lower house of Congress)
- House President (1876–1877)
- Justice Minister under Bartolomé Mitre for a short time (1867).
- Senator for the City of Buenos Aires (1901–1910)

Political offices
Preceded by Carlos Pellegrini	Vice President of Argentina; 1892–1895	Succeeded by Norberto Quirno Costa
Preceded by Luis Sáenz Peña	President of Argentina; 1895–1898	Succeeded by Julio A. Roca
