= Aristóbulo del Valle =

Argentine lawyer and politician

Doctor Aristóbulo del Valle
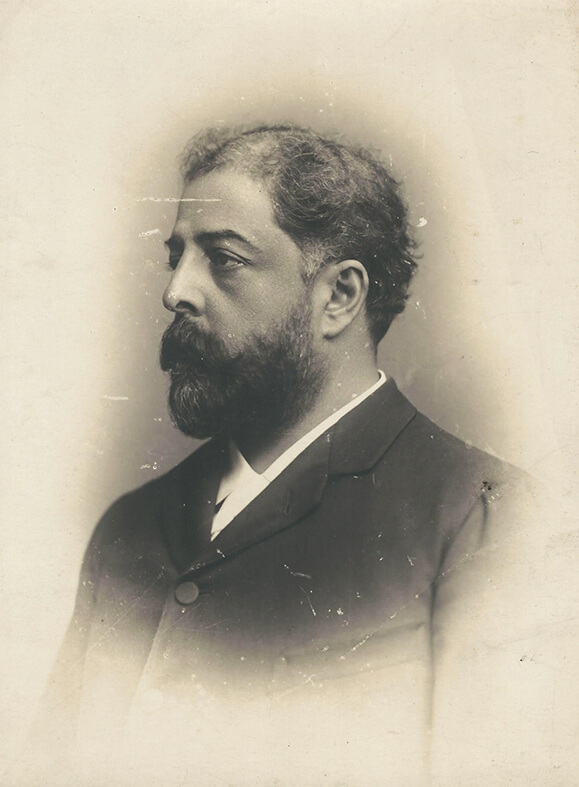
- Aristóbulo del Valle

Minister of War and the Navy
- In office 5 July 1893 – 12 August 1893
- President: Luis Sáenz Peña
- Preceded by: Eudoro Balsa
- Succeeded by: Luis María Campos

Provisional President of the Senate
- In office 1880–1881
- Preceded by: Benjamín Paz
- Succeeded by: Benjamín Paz

Personal details
- Born: 15 March 1845 Buenos Aires Province
- Died: 29 January 1896 (aged 50) Buenos Aires
- Resting place: Cementerio de la Recoleta
- Party: Unión Cívica Radical
- Spouse: Julia Tejedor Monterroso
- Parents: Narciso del Valle (father); Isabel Valdivieso Correa (mother)
- Occupation: politician
- Profession: jurist
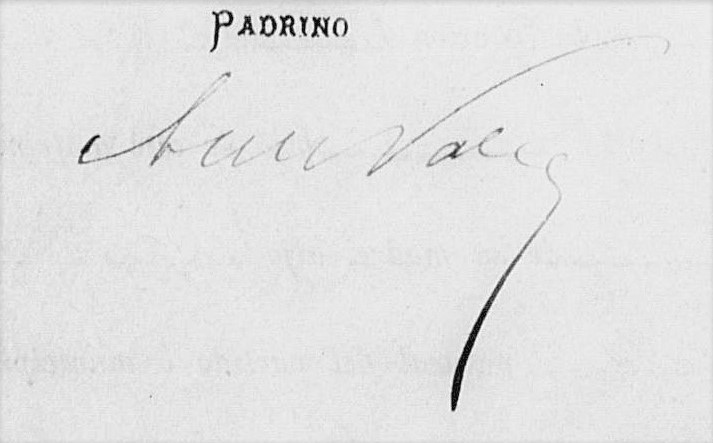
- Signature

Aristóbulo del Valle (15 March 1845 – 29 January 1896) was a lawyer and politician born in Dolores, province of Buenos Aires, Argentina. He was, together with Leandro Alem, one of the founders of the Radical Civic Union.

Del Valle studied in the Faculty of Law of the University of Buenos Aires. He abandoned his studies to join the army during the Paraguayan War, but later returned to his higher education studies and completed his degree. As a young man, he worked in the El Nacional newspaper of the city of Buenos Aires.

He entered politics supporting Adolfo Alsina, and was elected diputado (member of the Argentine Chamber of Deputies) in 1870. In 1876 he was elected to the Argentine Senate, and presided over the Upper House in 1880–1881.

He took part in the activism against the government of Miguel Juárez Celman in 1890 and was even considered an instigator of the uprisings of the 1890 revolution, due to which he was forced to leave his senatorial office, but he was re-elected the next year. From that point on, he supported the formation of the Radical Civic Union, an offshoot of the Civic Union proposed by Leandro Alem.

Del Valle also served in several Ministries during the term of President Luis Sáenz Peña (1892–1895). After his retirement, he taught law in the University of Buenos Aires. He died in his office at the School of Law in 1896, and is buried in La Recoleta Cemetery.

== Sources ==
- This article draws from the corresponding article in the Spanish Wikipedia.
