= Nicolás Levalle =

Argentine military officer (1840–1902)

General Nicolás Levalle
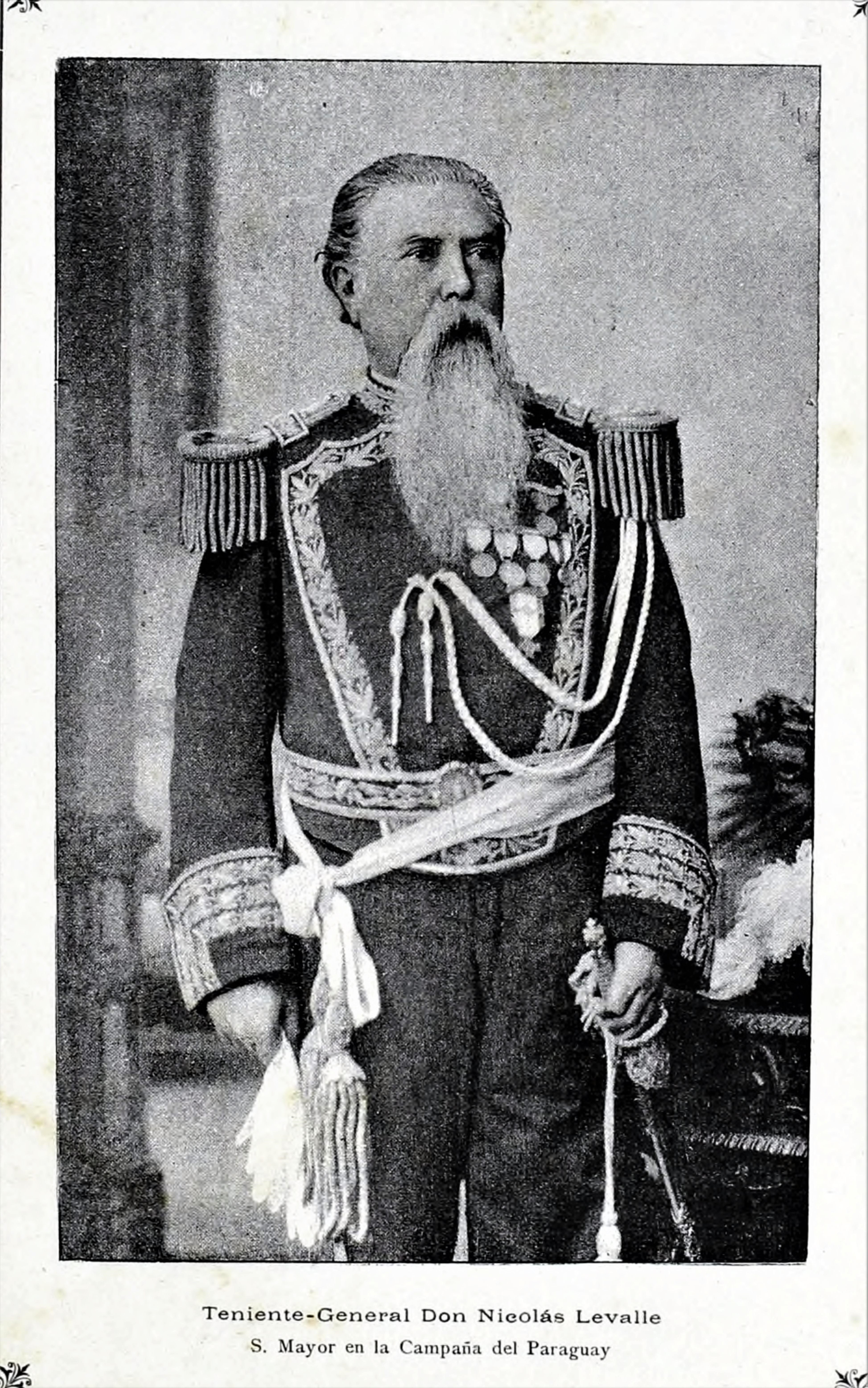
- Gral. Nicolás Levalle
- Born: Nicola Levaggi; December 6, 1840; Chiavari, Kingdom of Sardinia
- Died: January 28, 1902 (aged 61); Buenos Aires, Argentina
- Burial place: La Recoleta Cemetery
- Spouse: Aurelia Ferreyra
- Military career
- Argentine Army: 1852-1900
- Rank: Lieutenant General
- Conflicts: Argentine Civil Wars; Paraguayan War; Conquest of the Desert; Revolution of the Park

Nicolás Levalle (1840-1902) was an Argentine military officer, who took part in several military campaigns, including the Battle of Cepeda, Battle of Pavón on occasion of civil wars, and the Battle of Pehuajó and Battle of Yatay, during the Paraguayan War.

Levalle was born in Chiavari, Genoa, Italy, the son of Lorenzo Levaggi and Benedicta Daneri, a noble family who arrived in Buenos Aires in 1842. He had an active participation in most armed conflicts that occurred in Argentina between 1852 and 1893. He was Commander in Chief of the General Staff of the Argentine Army, serving in that position from 1887 to 1890.

Nicolás Levalle was the founder Argentine Military Circle, and served for several periods as Minister of War and Navy of the Argentine Republic. He was also in command of the 2° Regimiento de Caballería de Línea, taking an active part in the campaigns against the Indians during the Conquest of the Desert.
