= Luis María Campos =

Argentine general

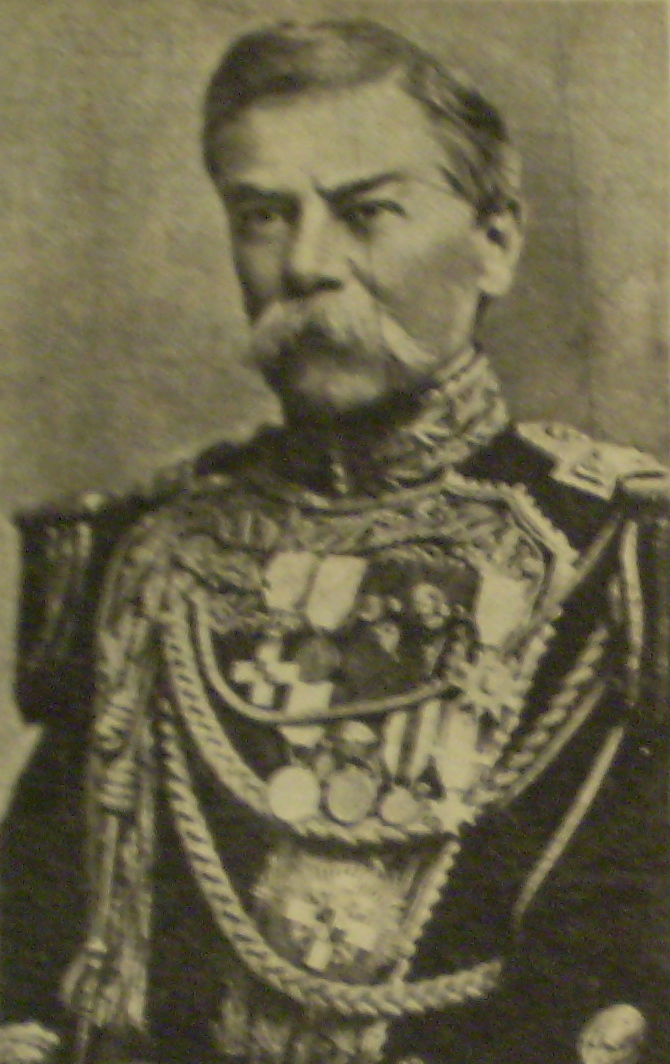
'Luis María Campos

Luis María Campos (born in Buenos Aires, June 1838, died in the same city, October 1907) was an Argentine general and founder of the Argentine Escuela Superior de Guerra, which is now named after him.

He initially joined the army of the State of Buenos Aires in 1856, only becoming part of the Argentine Army when the state rejoined the rest of Argentina in 1861. He fought for the State of Buenos Aires in the Argentine Civil Wars, fighting in the battles of Cepeda, Pavón, and Cañada de Gómez. He then fought for the Argentine Army in the Paraguayan War. He fought for the government during several rebellions: Ricardo López Jordán's rebellion, the uprising of 1874, the 1880 rebellion of Carlos Tejedor, and the 1890 Park Revolution.

In 1893, he was appointed Minister of War. In 1895 he left this job, to be promoted to lieutenant general and become head of the army. In 1898, he became Minister of War again. During this period, he founded the Escuela Superior de Guerra, which opened in May 1900 under German colonel Alfred Arent, and led a campaign of modernization based on the Prussian-German army.

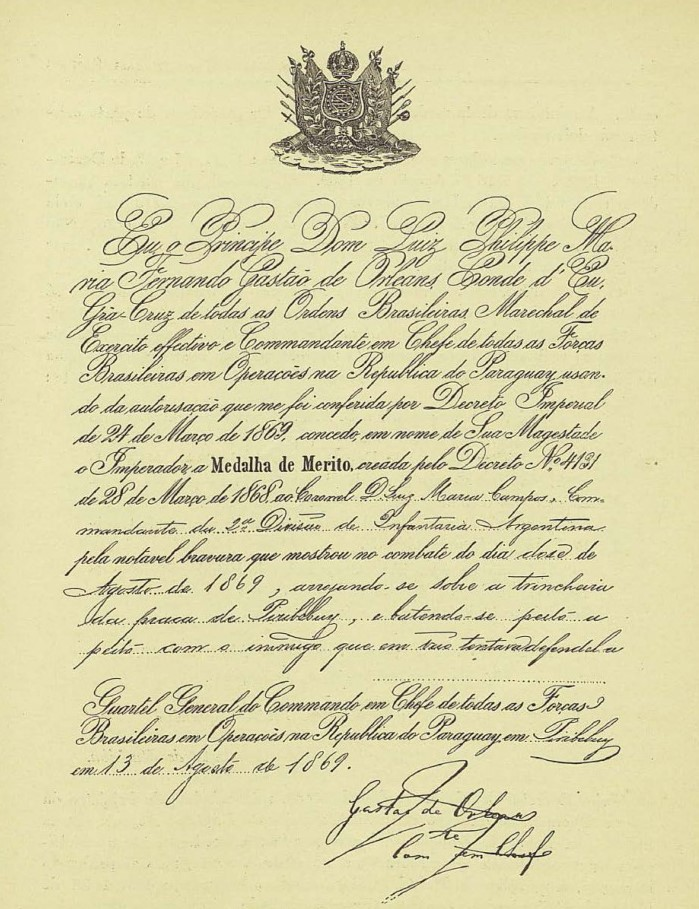
Paraguayan War document.

Luis María's father, Martín Teodoro Campos, had been a colonel, and his brothers Julio and Manuel also became Argentine generals.
