= List of heads of state of Argentina =

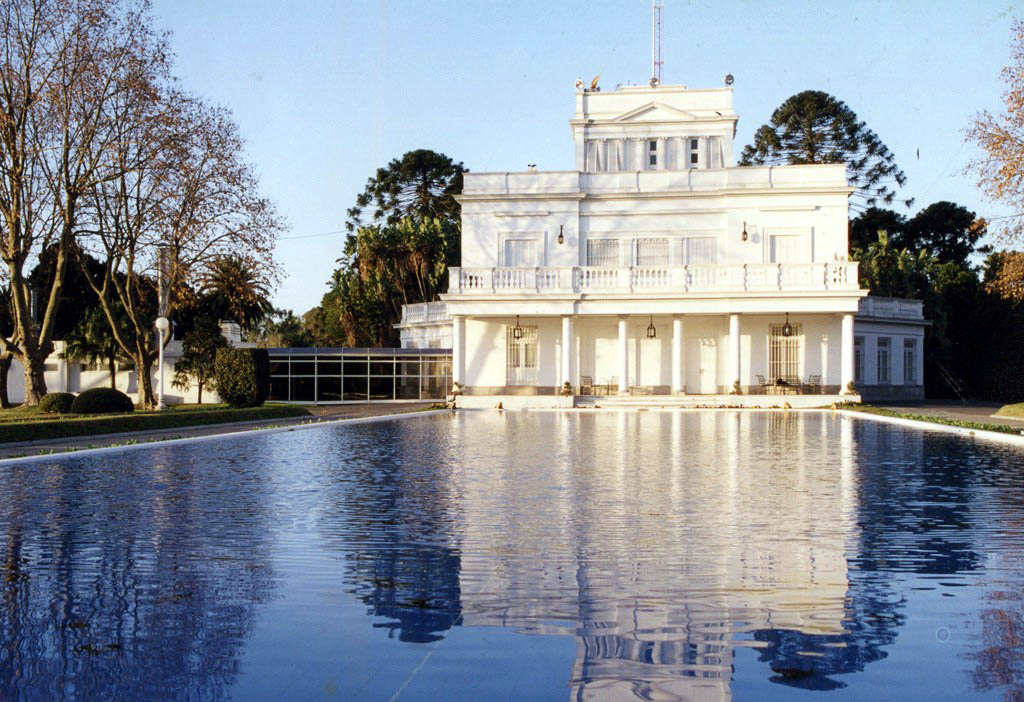
Quinta de Olivos, the official residence of the presidents of Argentina, pictured c. 1990

Argentina has had many different types of heads of state, as well as many different types of government. During pre-Columbian times, most of the territories that today form Argentina were inhabited by Amerindian peoples without any centralized government, with the exception of the Inca subjects of the Northwest and Cuyo regions. During the Spanish colonization of the Americas, the King of Spain retained the ultimate authority over the territories conquered in the New World, appointing viceroys for local government. The territories that would later become Argentina were first part of the Viceroyalty of Peru and then the Viceroyalty of the Río de la Plata. The May Revolution started the Argentine War of Independence by replacing the viceroy Baltasar Hidalgo de Cisneros with the first national government. It was the Primera Junta, a junta of several members, which would grow into the Junta Grande with the incorporation of provincial deputies. The size of the juntas gave room to internal political disputes among their members, so they were replaced by the First and Second Triumvirate, of three members. The Assembly of the Year XIII created a new executive authority, with attributions similar to that of a head of state, called the Supreme Director of the United Provinces of the Río de la Plata. A second Assembly, the Congress of Tucumán, declared independence in 1816 and promulgated the Argentine Constitution of 1819. However, this constitution was repealed during armed conflicts between the central government and the Federal League Provinces. This started a period known as the Anarchy of the Year XX, when Argentina lacked any type of head of state.

There was a new attempt to organize a central government in 1826. A new congress wrote a new constitution and elected Bernardino Rivadavia as President in the process. Rivadavia was the first President of Argentina. However, he resigned shortly after and the 1826 Constitution was repealed. The Argentine provinces then organized themselves as a confederation without a central head of state. In this organization, the governors of Buenos Aires province took some duties such as the payment of external debt or the administration of the foreign relations in the name of all provinces. Those governors were appointed by the Buenos Aires legislature, with the only exception of Juan Lavalle. Juan Manuel de Rosas kept the governor office for seventeen consecutive years until Justo José de Urquiza defeated him at the 1852 Battle of Caseros. Urquiza then called for a new Constitutional Assembly and promulgated the Argentine Constitution of 1853, which is the current Constitution of Argentina through amendments. In 1854, Urquiza became the first President of modern Argentina, acting both as head of government and head of state. However, the Buenos Aires Province had rejected the Constitution and became an independent state until the aftermath of the 1859 Battle of Cepeda, although the internecine conflict continued. Only after the subsequent Battle of Pavón in 1861, the former bonaerense leader Bartolomé Mitre became the first president of a unified Argentine Republic.

The succession line of constitutional presidents run uninterrupted until 1930, when José Félix Uriburu took government through a civic-military coup d'état. For many decades, there was an alternance between legitimate presidents and others that took government through illegitimate means. Those means included military coups, but also proscriptions of major political parties and electoral fraud. The last coup d'état occurred in 1976 and resulted in the National Reorganization Process, which ended in 1983. The retrospective recognition as presidents or heads of state of any de facto ruler that exercised its authority outside the Constitutional mandate is a controversial and relevant issue in Argentine politics. However, their government actions were recognized as valid following the de facto government doctrine that used to legitimize them. This doctrine was rejected by the 1994 amendment and would not be applicable for potential future coups. The current head of state is President Javier Milei, who took office on 10 December 2023.

== Affiliation keys ==
Abbreviation	Party name (English)	Party name (Spanish)	Years
Unitarian	Unitarian Party	Partido Unitario	1826–1827, 1828–1829
Federal	Federalist Party	Partido Federal	1827–1828, 1829–1861
Liberal	Liberal Party	Partido Liberal	1862–1868
—	Independent politician	Político independiente	1868–1874
PAN	National Autonomist Party	Partido Autonomista Nacional	1874–1916
UCR	Radical Civic Union	Unión Cívica Radical	1916–1930, 1958–1966, 1983–1989, 1999–2001
Military	Armed Forces of the Argentine Republic	Fuerzas Armadas de la República Argentina	1930–1932, 1943–1946, 1955–1958, 1966–1973, 1976–1983
Concordancia	Concordancia	Concordancia	1932–1943
PJ	Justicialist Party	Partido Justicialista	1946–1955, 1973–1976, 1989–1999, 2001–2015, 2019–2023
PRO	Republican Proposal	Propuesta Republicana	2015–2019
PL	Libertarian Party	Partido Libertario	2023–present

== United Provinces of the Río de la Plata (1810–1831) ==
=== Junta presidents (1810–1811) ===
Portrait	Name (Birth–Death)	Term of office			Notes	R.
Portrait	Name (Birth–Death)	Start	End	Duration	Notes	R.
	Cornelio Saavedra (1759–1829)	25 May 1810	18 December 1810	207 days	President of the Primera Junta, at the beginning of the Argentine War of Independence. He is regarded as the first president of a national government.	
	Cornelio Saavedra (1759–1829)	18 December 1810	26 August 1811	251 days	President of the Junta Grande. Left to serve in the Army of the North.	
	Domingo Matheu (1765–1831)	26 August 1811	23 September 1811	28 days	President of the Junta Grande, from Saavedra's departure to the dissolution of it.	

=== Triumvirates (1811–1814) ===
First Triumvirate 23 September 1811 – 8 October 1812
23 September 1811 – 23 March 1812	23 March 1812 – 8 October 1812
Feliciano Chiclana (1761–1826)
Manuel de Sarratea (1774–1849)
Juan José Paso (1758–1833)	Juan Martín de Pueyrredón (1776–1850)

Second Triumvirate 8 October 1812 – 31 January 1814
8 October 1812 – 20 February 1813	20 February 1813 – 19 August 1813	19 August 1813 – 5 November 1813	5 November 1813 – 31 January 1814
Nicolás Rodríguez Peña (1775–1853)
Antonio Álvarez Jonte (1784–1820)		Gervasio Antonio de Posadas (1757–1833)	
Juan José Paso (1758–1833)	José Julián Pérez (1770–1840)		Juan Larrea (1782–1847)

=== Supreme Directors (1814–1820) ===
Portrait	Name (Birth–Death)	Term of office			Notes	R.
Portrait	Name (Birth–Death)	Start	End	Duration	Notes	R.
	Gervasio Antonio de Posadas (1757–1833)	31 January 1814	9 January 1815	343 days	Chosen by the Assembly of the Year 1813.	
	Carlos María de Alvear (1789–1852)	9 January 1815	18 April 1815	99 days	Forced to resign by a mutiny.	
	José de San Martín (1778–1850) Matías de Irigoyen (1781–1839) Manuel de Sarratea (1774–1849)	18 April 1815	20 April 1815	2 days	Third Triumvirate. Interim government until the appointment of a new Supreme Director.	
	José Rondeau (1773–1844)	20 April 1815	21 April 1815	1 day	Appointed successor of Alvear, could not take office because he was in command of the Army of the North	
	Ignacio Álvarez Thomas (1787–1857)	21 April 1815	16 April 1816	361 days	Acting, for Rondeau. Convened the Congress of Tucumán, that would declare Independence.	
	Antonio González de Balcarce (1774–1819)	16 April 1816	9 July 1816	84 days	Interim.	
	Juan Martín de Pueyrredón (1776–1850)	9 July 1816	9 June 1819	2 years, 335 days	First Argentine Head of State after the Argentine Declaration of Independence. Supported the Crossing of the Andes.	
	José Rondeau (1773–1844)	9 June 1819	1 February 1820	237 days	Decisively defeated at the Battle of Cepeda by Federalist forces opposed to the 1819 centralist Constitution.	
	Juan Pedro Aguirre (1781–1837)	1 February 1820	11 February 1820	10 days	Interim. Dissolved the National Congress and endorsed the Buenos Aires Cabildo to choose a Governor for Buenos Aires Province instead of the previous post of Governor Mayor.	

=== Governors of Buenos Aires Province managing international relations (1820–1826) ===
Between 1820 and 1826, the United Provinces functioned as a loose alliance of autonomous provinces put together by pacts and treaties (see Treaty of Pilar, Treaty of Benegas, Quadrilateral Treaty), but lacking any actual central government until the 1825 Constitutional Congress.

Portrait	Name (Birth–Death)	Term of office			Notes	R.
Portrait	Name (Birth–Death)	Start	End	Duration	Notes	R.
	Matías de Irigoyen (1781–1839)	11 February 1820	18 February 1820	7 days	He had been Governor Mayor from 9 to 11 February 1820 and was promoted interim as Governor until the appointment of Manuel de Sarratea.	
	Manuel de Sarratea (1774–1849)	18 February 1820	6 March 1820 (Note: Resigned from office.)	17 days	The political crisis that existed in the country led to his government lacked support from both Buenos Aires and the other provinces. Thus he resigned shortly afterwards.	
	Juan Ramón Balcarce (1773–1836)	6 March 1820	11 March 1820	5 days	Interim.	
	Manuel de Sarratea (1774–1849)	11 March 1820	2 May 1820	52 days	He returned to office after the end of the brief government of Balcarce. The circumstances did not improve and ended up resigning a second time.	
	Ildefonso Ramos Mexía (1769–1854)	2 May 1820	20 June 1820	49 days		
	Ildefonso Ramos Mexía and Miguel Estanislao Soler	20 June 1820	23 June 1820	3 days	They took power simultaneously.	
	Miguel Estanislao Soler (1783–1849)	23 June 1820	29 June 1820	6 days	He assumed de facto, after an armed uprising, but his government lasted a few days, when the Board of Representatives appointed Manuel Dorrego.	
	Manuel Dorrego (1787–1828)	29 June 1820	20 September 1820	83 days	Interim.	
	Martín Rodríguez (1771–1845)	20 September 1820	2 April 1824	3 years, 195 days	He signed the Treaty of Benegas and the Quadrilateral.	
	Juan Gregorio de las Heras (1780–1866)	2 April 1824	7 February 1826	1 year, 311 days	He called a Constituent Congress that enacted several laws for which the Unitary Republic was proclaimed.	

=== First presidential government (1826–1827) ===
Portrait	Name (Birth–Death)	Term of office			Elections	Political party	Notes	R.
Portrait	Name (Birth–Death)	Start	End	Duration	Elections	Political party	Notes	R.
	Bernardino Rivadavia (1780–1845)	8 February 1826	27 June 1827	1 year, 139 days	1826	Unitarian	Elected by the Constituent Assembly of 1826, before the promulgation of the 1826 constitution. Waged the Cisplatine War. Resigned as the Constitution was rejected by the provinces and the outcome of the war generated popular discontent.	
	Vicente López y Planes (1785–1856)	7 July 1827	18 August 1827	42 days	1826	—	Elected as interim president by the Constituent Assembly of 1826. His mandate was limited to close the Assembly and call for elections for a new governor of Buenos Aires.	

=== Governors of Buenos Aires Province managing international relations (1827–1831) ===
Portrait	Name (Birth–Death)	Term of office			Political party	Notes	R.
Portrait	Name (Birth–Death)	Start	End	Duration	Political party	Notes	R.
	Manuel Dorrego (1787–1828)	18 August 1827	1 December 1828 (Note: Ousted in coup d'état.)	1 year, 105 days	Federal	Ended the Cisplatine War. Later executed by Juan Lavalle.	
	Juan Lavalle (1797–1841)	1 December 1828	26 June 1829	207 days	Unitarian	Defeated in battle, resigned under siege	
	Juan José Viamonte (1774–1843)	26 June 1829	6 December 1829	163 days	Federal	Interim.	
	Juan Manuel de Rosas (1793–1877); First term	6 December 1829	4 January 1831	1 year, 29 days	Federal	Signed the Federal Pact and waged war against the Unitarian League.	

== Argentine Confederation (1831–1861) ==
=== Governors managing international relations (1831–1852) ===
Portrait	Name (Birth–Death)	Term of office			Political party	Notes	R.
Portrait	Name (Birth–Death)	Start	End	Duration	Political party	Notes	R.
	Juan Manuel de Rosas (1793–1877); First term	4 January 1831	5 December 1832	1 year, 336 days	Federal	Governor of Buenos Aires Province. Signed the Federal Pact and waged war against the Unitarian League.	
	Juan Ramón Balcarce (1773–1836)	5 December 1832	4 November 1833	334 days	Federal	Governor of Buenos Aires Province. Ousted by the Revolution of the Restorers.	
	Juan José Viamonte (1774–1843)	4 November 1833	27 June 1834	235 days	Federal	Governor of Buenos Aires Province. Interim.	
	Manuel Vicente Maza (1779–1839)	27 June 1834	7 March 1835	253 days	Federal	Governor of Buenos Aires Province. Interim as president of the legislature	
	Juan Manuel de Rosas (1793–1877); Second term	7 March 1835	3 February 1852	16 years, 333 days	Federal	Governor of Buenos Aires Province with the sum of public power; it is usually considered as a coup. Waged the Argentine and Uruguayan Civil Wars, the War of the Confederation and the French and Anglo-French blockade of the Río de la Plata. Designated "Supreme Chief of the Argentine Confederation" in 1851. Defeated by Justo José de Urquiza at the Battle of Caseros.	
	Vicente López y Planes (1785–1856)	3 February 1852	6 April 1852	63 days	—	Governor of Buenos Aires Province. Interim. From 6 April through 26 July 1852 remained as Governor of Buenos Aires Province, but without national powers.	
	Justo José de Urquiza (1801–1870)	6 April 1852	31 May 1852	55 days	Federal	Governor of Entre Ríos Province in charge of the foreign relations of the Confederation.	

=== Provisional Director of the Argentine Confederation (1852–1854) ===
Portrait	Name (Birth–Death)	Term of office			Political party	Notes	R.
Portrait	Name (Birth–Death)	Start	End	Duration	Political party	Notes	R.
	Justo José de Urquiza (1801–1870)	31 May 1852	5 March 1854	1 year, 278 days	Federal	Simultaneously, Governor of Entre Ríos Province and of Buenos Aires Province (from 26 July 1852 to 4 September 1852). On 11 September 1852, the Province of Buenos Aires seceded from the Argentine Confederation as the State of Buenos Aires. On 1 May 1853, the current Constitution of Argentina was ratified by all the provinces, except from Buenos Aires.	

=== Presidents of the Confederation (1854–1861) ===
Portrait	Name (Birth–Death)	Term of office			Elections	Political party	Notes	Vice President	R.
Portrait	Name (Birth–Death)	Start	End	Duration	Elections	Political party	Notes	Vice President	R.
	Justo José de Urquiza (1801–1870)	5 March 1854	5 March 1860	6 years, 0 days	1853 (Note: The 1853 Constitution established a process for electing the President and Vice President and national senators using an electoral college. As such the elections were indirect and not necessarily reflective of popular vote.)	Federal	First constitutional President of Argentina. The reincoporation of the State of Buenos Aires was negotiated after the Battle of Cepeda in the Pact of San José de Flores.	Salvador María del Carril	
	Santiago Derqui (1809–1867)	5 March 1860	5 November 1861	1 year, 245 days	1859	Federal	On 18 October 1860, a constitutional reform is adopted, proclaiming the Argentine Republic. Resigned after the failure of the Pact of San José de Flores and the national government defeat to Buenos Aires Province in the Battle of Pavón.	Juan Esteban Pedernera	
	Juan Esteban Pedernera (1796–1886)	5 November 1861	12 December 1861	37 days	Constitutional succession	Unitarian		Vacant	

== Argentine Republic (1861–present) ==
=== Presidents (1861–present) ===
Portrait	Name (Birth–Death)	Term of office			Elections	Political party (Coalition)	Notes	Vice President	R.
Portrait	Name (Birth–Death)	Start	End	Duration	Elections	Political party (Coalition)	Notes	Vice President	R.
	Bartolomé Mitre (1821–1906)	12 December 1861	12 April 1862	6 years, 305 days	De facto leader	Liberal	Governor of Buenos Aires Province de facto in charge of the national government after the Battle of Pavón and the resignation of Juan Esteban Pedernera. During the following months, the provinces gave Mitre different powers. (Note: Catamarca, Córdoba, Mendoza, Santa Fe, Salta, Santiago del Estero and Tucumán accept Mitre as the person in charge of the National Executive Power. Buenos Aires, San Juan and Jujuy only gave Mitre the authority to manage international relations, to convene the National Congress, and to rule on urgent internal business. Corrientes, La Rioja and San Luis only gave Mitre the authority to manage international relations and to convene the National Congress. Entre Ríos only gave Mitre the authority to convene the National Congress.)	Vacant	
	Bartolomé Mitre (1821–1906)	12 April 1862	2 June 1862	6 years, 305 days	Self-appointed	Liberal	Self-appointed "Governor of Buenos Aires Province in charge of the National Executive Power".	Vacant	
	Bartolomé Mitre (1821–1906)	2 June 1862	12 October 1862	6 years, 305 days	Appointed by the Congress	Liberal	The National Congress appointed the Governor of Buenos Aires as the person in charge of the National Executive Power until elections were held.	Vacant	
	Bartolomé Mitre (1821–1906)	12 October 1862	12 October 1868	6 years, 305 days	1862 (Note: Mitre was the only candidate in the election.)	Liberal ↓ Nationalist	First president of the unified country. Waged the War of the Triple Alliance.	Marcos Paz † (Note: Died on 2 January 1868 during cholera epidemic.)	
	Marcos Paz (1811–1868)	12 June 1865	2 January 1868 † (Note: Died during cholera epidemic.)	2 years, 204 days	Constitutional succession	Liberal	Acting president while Mitre was commanding forces during the War of the Triple Alliance.	Himself	
	Domingo Faustino Sarmiento (1811–1888)	12 October 1868	12 October 1874	6 years, 0 days	1868	—	Ended the War of the Triple Alliance.	Adolfo Alsina	
	Nicolás Avellaneda (1837–1885)	12 October 1874	12 October 1880	6 years, 0 days	1874	National ↓ PAN	Federalization of Buenos Aires City in September 1880.	Mariano Acosta	
	Julio Argentino Roca (1843–1914); First term	12 October 1880	12 October 1886	6 years, 0 days	1880	PAN	End of the Argentine Civil Wars.	Francisco Bernabé Madero	
	Miguel Ángel Juárez Celman (1844–1909)	12 October 1886	6 August 1890 (Note: Resigned following the Revolution of the Park.)	3 years, 298 days	1886	PAN		Carlos Pellegrini	
	Carlos Pellegrini (1846–1906)	6 August 1890	12 October 1892	2 years, 67 days	Constitutional succession	PAN		Vacant	
	Luis Sáenz Peña (1822–1907)	12 October 1892	22 January 1895	2 years, 102 days	1892	PAN	Government victory in the Revolution of 1893.	José Evaristo Uriburu	
	José Evaristo Uriburu (1831–1914)	22 January 1895	12 October 1898	3 years, 263 days	Constitutional succession	PAN		Vacant	
	Julio Argentino Roca (1843–1914); Second term	12 October 1898	12 October 1904	6 years, 0 days	1898	PAN		Norberto Quirno Costa	
	Manuel Quintana (1835–1906)	12 October 1904	12 March 1906 † (Note: Died of Natural Causes.)	1 year, 151 days	1904	PAN	Government victory in the Revolution of 1905.	José Figueroa Alcorta	
	José Figueroa Alcorta (1860–1931)	25 January 1906	12 March 1906	4 years, 260 days	Constitutional succession	PAN	Acting president during Quintana's illness.	Himself	
	José Figueroa Alcorta (1860–1931)	12 March 1906	12 October 1910	4 years, 260 days	Constitutional succession	PAN		Vacant	
	Roque Sáenz Peña (1851–1914)	12 October 1910	9 August 1914 †	3 years, 301 days	1910	PAN; Modernist	Promoted the Sáenz Peña law, which allowed secret, universal and mandatory suffrage.	Victorino de la Plaza	
	Victorino de la Plaza (1840–1919)	9 August 1914	12 October 1916	2 years, 64 days	Constitutional succession	PAN		Vacant	
	Hipólito Yrigoyen (1852–1933); First term	12 October 1916	12 October 1922	6 years, 0 days	1916	UCR	First president elected under the Sáenz Peña law. Maintained neutrality during World War I.	Pelagio Luna † (Note: Died on 25 June 1919.)	
	Marcelo Torcuato de Alvear (1868–1942)	12 October 1922	12 October 1928	6 years, 0 days	1922	UCR		Elpidio González	
	Hipólito Yrigoyen (1852–1933); Second term	12 October 1928	6 September 1930	1 year, 329 days	1928	UCR		Enrique Martínez	
	Enrique Martínez (1887–1938)	5 September 1930	6 September 1930	1 day	Constitutional succession	UCR	Acting president during Yrigoyen's illness.	Himself	
	José Félix Uriburu (1868–1932)	6 September 1930	20 February 1932	1 year, 167 days	Coup d'état	Military (ALN)	First coup d'état in modern Argentine history. Beginning of the Infamous Decade. Called for elections.	Enrique Santamarina (Note: Resigned on 20 October 1930.)	
	Agustín Pedro Justo (1876–1943)	20 February 1932	20 February 1938	6 years, 0 days	1931 (Note: Election results are considered mired by fraudulent practices.) (Note: UCR was barred from participating in the election.)	UCR-A (Concordancia)		Julio Argentino Pascual Roca	
	Roberto Marcelino Ortiz (1886–1942)	20 February 1938	27 June 1942 (Note: Died 1 month after resigning.)	4 years, 127 days	1937	UCR-A (Concordancia)		Ramón Castillo	
	Ramón Castillo (1873–1944)	3 July 1940	27 June 1942	2 years, 336 days	Constitutional succession	PDN (Concordancia)	Acting president during Ortiz's illness.	Himself	
	Ramón Castillo (1873–1944)	27 June 1942	4 June 1943	2 years, 336 days	Constitutional succession	PDN (Concordancia)	End of the Infamous Decade.	Vacant	
	Arturo Rawson (1885–1952)	4 June 1943	7 June 1943	3 days	Coup d'état	Military (GOU–affiliated)	Beginning of the Revolution of '43.	Vacant	
	Pedro Pablo Ramírez (1884–1962)	7 June 1943	9 March 1944	276 days	Coup d'etat	Military (GOU–affiliated)		Sabá Sueyro † (Note: Died on 15 October 1943.)	
	Pedro Pablo Ramírez (1884–1962)	7 June 1943	9 March 1944	276 days	Coup d'etat	Military (GOU–affiliated)		Edelmiro Julián Farrell	
	Edelmiro Julián Farrell (1887–1980)	25 February 1944 (Note: On 25 February 1944, Ramírez temporarily delegated powers to Edelmiro Farrell.)	9 March 1944	2 years, 99 days	Constitutional succession	Military (GOU–affiliated)	Acting president.	Himself	
	Edelmiro Julián Farrell (1887–1980)	9 March 1944	4 June 1946	2 years, 99 days	Constitutional succession	Military (GOU–affiliated)	Declared war on the Axis powers. End of the Revolution of '43.	Vacant	
	Edelmiro Julián Farrell (1887–1980)	9 March 1944	4 June 1946	2 years, 99 days	Constitutional succession	Military (GOU–affiliated)	Declared war on the Axis powers. End of the Revolution of '43.	Juan Perón (Note: Was appointed Vice President and Secretary of War on 8 July 1944. He was forced to resign by the junta on 10 October 1945 due to his rising popularity and was arrested 4 days later, but was released due to the mass demostrations on 17 October 1945.)	
	Edelmiro Julián Farrell (1887–1980)	9 March 1944	4 June 1946	2 years, 99 days	Constitutional succession	Military (GOU–affiliated)	Declared war on the Axis powers. End of the Revolution of '43.	Juan Pistarini	
	Juan Perón (1895–1974); First and Second terms	4 June 1946	4 June 1952	9 years, 109 days	1946	Labour (UCR-JR) (Independent Party)	Oversaw the Constitutional Reforms of 1949.	Hortensio Quijano † (Note: Died on 3 April 1952.)	
	Juan Perón (1895–1974); First and Second terms	4 June 1952	21 September 1955	9 years, 109 days	1951 (Note: The 1949 reforms abolished the electoral college and provided for popular elections and allowed for the president to seek re-election.)	Peronist	First election to allow women's suffrage. Won reelection with 62.49% of votes, the highest vote margin ever in Argentine elections.	Alberto Teisaire (Note: Took office on 7 May 1954 after winning the special election to replace Vice President Quijano who had died in 1952. Teisaire was forced to resign on 16 September 1955 as part of the Revolución Libertadora.)	
	Eduardo Lonardi (1896–1956)	16 September 1955	23 September 1955	58 days	Revolución Libertadora	Military	Self-appointed as "Provisional President of the Nation"; from 19 September 1955 until 23 September 1955, the office was disputed with José Domingo Molina Gómez, the leader of the military junta.	Vacant	
	Eduardo Lonardi (1896–1956)	23 September 1955	13 November 1955	58 days	Revolución Libertadora	Military	Lonardi is sworn in as president.	Isaac Rojas	
	Pedro Eugenio Aramburu (1903–1970)	13 November 1955	1 May 1958	2 years, 169 days	Coup d'état	Military	The 1949 Constitution is repealed and the 1853 Constitution is restored. End of the Revolución Libertadora.	Isaac Rojas	
	Arturo Frondizi (1908–1995)	1 May 1958	29 March 1962	3 years, 332 days	1958 (Note: Peronist candidates were barred from participating in the election.) (Note: The repeal of the 1949 Constitution restored the electoral college.)	UCRI		Alejandro Gómez (Note: Resigned on 18 November 1958.)	
	José María Guido (1910–1975)	29 March 1962	12 October 1963	1 year, 197 days	Coup d'état	UCRI	Provisional President of the Senate exercising the Executive Power, as the civil procedures to replace the deposed president were followed and Vice President Alejandro Gómez had resigned in 1958.	Vacant	
	Arturo Umberto Illia (1900–1983)	12 October 1963	28 June 1966	2 years, 259 days	1963	UCRP		Carlos Humberto Perette	
	Junta of Commanders of the Armed Forces	28 June 1966	29 June 1966	1 day	Coup d'état	Military	Beginning of the Argentine Revolution. Members of the Junta: Pascual Pistarini; Benigno Ignacio Varela; Adolfo Teodoro Álvarez.	Vacant	
	Juan Carlos Onganía (1914–1995)	29 June 1966	8 June 1970 (Note: Forced to resign by the junta.)	3 years, 344 days	Appointed by the Junta	Military	President during the Cordobazo.	Vacant	
	Junta of Commanders of the Armed Forces	8 June 1970	18 June 1970	10 days	Coup d'état	Military	Members of the Junta: Pedro Alberto José Gnavi (President); Alejandro Agustín Lanusse; Carlos Alberto Rey	Vacant	
	Roberto Marcelo Levingston (1920–2015)	18 June 1970	23 March 1971	278 days	Appointed by the Junta	Military		Vacant	
	Junta of Commanders of the Armed Forces	23 March 1971	26 March 1971	3 days	Coup d'état	Military	Members of the Junta: Alejandro Agustín Lanusse (President); Pedro Alberto José Gnavi; Carlos Alberto Rey	Vacant	
	Alejandro Agustín Lanusse (1918–1996)	26 March 1971	25 May 1973	2 years, 60 days	Appointed by the Junta	Military	End of the Argentine Revolution. Called for elections. Peronism ban lifted.	Vacant	
	Héctor José Cámpora (1909–1980)	25 May 1973	13 July 1973	49 days	March; 1973 (Note: The outgoing junta decreed a "temporary constitutional reform" which provided for a two-round direct election by popular vote system. The system was supposed to be ratified by a future constitutional convention, but the convention was never held and the change expired.) (Note: Because no candidate was able to get 50% of the votes needed to win, a runoff should have taken place between Cámpora and Ricardo Balbín, but Balbín decided to withdraw his candidacy, making Cámpora president.)	PJ (FREJULI)	First Peronist president after the ban. Cámpora annulled the ban that remained specifically over Juan Perón.	Vicente Solano Lima	
	Raúl Alberto Lastiri (1915–1978)	13 July 1973	12 October 1973	91 days	Constitutional succession	PJ (FREJULI)	President of the Chamber of Deputies exercising the Executive Power. Alejandro Díaz Bialet, President of the Senate and ahead of Lastiri in the succession line, was on a diplomatic mission in Africa at that time.	Vacant	
	Juan Perón (1895–1974); Third term	12 October 1973	1 July 1974 †	262 days	Sept. 1973	PJ (FREJULI)		Isabel Perón	
	Isabel Perón (born 1931)	29 June 1974	1 July 1974	1 year, 239 days	Constitutional succession	PJ (FREJULI)	Acting president during Juan's illness.	Herself	
	Isabel Perón (born 1931)	1 July 1974	24 March 1976	1 year, 239 days	Constitutional succession	PJ (FREJULI)	First female president in the Americas. From 13 September 1975 until 16 October 1975, Provisional President of the Senate Ítalo Argentino Luder exercised the Executive Power, due to Perón's health problems.	Vacant	
	Military Junta	24 March 1976	29 March 1976	5 days	Coup d'état	Military	Coup d'état. Beginning of the National Reorganization Process. Members of the Junta: Jorge Rafael Videla; Emilio Eduardo Massera; Orlando Ramón Agosti.	Vacant	
	Jorge Rafael Videla (1925–2013)	29 March 1976	29 March 1981	5 years, 0 days	Appointed by the Junta	Military	President of the Military Junta. Longest government of a de facto leader.	Vacant	
	Roberto Eduardo Viola (1924–1994)	29 March 1981	11 December 1981 (Note: Military Junta issued an ultimateum to Viola, urging him to resign. Viola refused to resign and the Junta deposed him.)	257 days	Appointed by Videla	Military	President of the Military Junta	Vacant	
	Horacio Tomás Liendo (1924–2007)	21 November 1981 (Note: Viola had his powers and duties suspended by the junta on 21 November 1981 due to health problems.)	11 December 1981	20 days	Appointed by the Junta	Military	Acting president during Viola's suspension.	Vacant	
	Carlos Lacoste (1929–2004)	11 December 1981	22 December 1981	11 days	Appointed by the Junta	Military	Interim President of the Military Junta	Vacant	
	Leopoldo Galtieri (1926–2003)	22 December 1981	18 June 1982 (Note: Removed from office by the Military Junta following his defeat in the Faklands War.)	178 days	Appointed by the Junta	Military	President of the Military Junta. Waged the Falklands War.	Vacant	
	Alfredo Oscar Saint Jean (1926–1987)	18 June 1982	1 July 1982	13 days	Appointed by the Junta	Military	Interim President of the Military Junta	Vacant	
	Reynaldo Bignone (1928–2018)	1 July 1982	10 December 1983	1 year, 162 days	Appointed by the Junta	Military	President of the Military Junta. End of the National Reorganization Process. Called for elections.	Vacant	
	(Presidency); Raúl Alfonsín (1927–2009)	10 December 1983	8 July 1989	5 years, 210 days	1983 (Note: This election was conducted using the electoral college as the 1973 "temporary constitutional reform", which provided for a two-round direct election by popular vote, had expired.)	UCR		Víctor Hipólito Martínez	
	(Presidency); Carlos Menem (1930–2021)	8 July 1989 (Note: Alfonsin resigned during the transition and gave power to Carlos Menem six months in advance.)	8 July 1995	10 years, 155 days	1989	PJ (FREJUPO)		Eduardo Duhalde (Note: Resigned on 10 December 1991.)	
	(Presidency); Carlos Menem (1930–2021)	8 July 1995	10 December 1999 (Note: His term was extended to 10 December 1999 according to the Tenth Temporary Provision of the Constitution of 1994.)	10 years, 155 days	1995 (Note: A 1994 constitutional amendment reduced the presidential term from 6 to 4 years and allowed reelection for a single consecutive term. The electoral college was also abolished and all elections since have used a popular vote system.)	PJ (UCeDe)		Carlos Ruckauf	
	(Presidency); Fernando de la Rúa (1937–2019)	10 December 1999	21 December 2001 (Note: Faced a severe economic crisis. Resigned after the December 2001 riots. Because his Vice President Carlos Álvarez had resigned in October 2000, the Congress Assembled selected a new president.)	2 years, 11 days	1999	UCR (Alianza)		Carlos Álvarez (Note: Resigned on 6 October 2000.)	
	Ramón Puerta (born 1951)	21 December 2001	23 December 2001	2 days	Constitutional succession	PJ	Provisional President of the Senate exercising the Executive Power.	Vacant	
	Adolfo Rodríguez Saá (born 1947)	23 December 2001	30 December 2001	7 days	Elected by the Congress (Note: Because his Vice President Carlos Álvarez had resigned in October 2000, the Congress Assembled selected a new president.)	PJ	Elected by the Congress for three months, with instructions to call for elections.	Vacant	
	Eduardo Camaño (born 1946)	30 December 2001	2 January 2002	3 days	Constitutional succession	PJ	President of the Chamber of Deputies exercising the Executive Power.	Vacant	
	Eduardo Duhalde (born 1941)	2 January 2002	25 May 2003	1 year, 143 days	Elected by the Congress	PJ	Called early elections for 27 April 2003.	Vacant	
	(Presidency); Néstor Kirchner (1950–2010)	25 May 2003	10 December 2003	4 years, 199 days	2003 (Note: Kirchner finished second to Carlos Menem in the first round and because no one was able to get 45% of the votes needed to win, a runoff should have taken place, but Menem decided to withdraw his candidacy, making Kirchner president.)	PJ (FPV)	Completed the remaining months of De la Rúa's term.	Daniel Scioli	
	(Presidency); Néstor Kirchner (1950–2010)	10 December 2003	10 December 2007	4 years, 199 days	2003	PJ (FPV)	Started own mandate.	Daniel Scioli	
	(Presidency); Cristina Fernández de Kirchner (born 1953)	10 December 2007	10 December 2011	8 years, 0 days	2007	PJ (FPV)	First elected female president of Argentina.	Julio Cobos	
	(Presidency); Cristina Fernández de Kirchner (born 1953)	10 December 2011	10 December 2015 (Note: By judicial ruling, her mandate ended 9 December 2015 at midnight.)	8 years, 0 days	2011	PJ (FPV)	First elected female president of Argentina.	Amado Boudou	
	Federico Pinedo (born 1955)	10 December 2015	10 December 2015	11:45 hs	—	PRO (Cambiemos)	Provisional President of the Senate exercising the Executive Power.	Vacant	
	(Presidency); Mauricio Macri (born 1959)	10 December 2015 (Note: Although his mandate begun on 10 December 2015 at 00:00 hs., it was only after he swore in the Congress at 11:45 hs. that he took office as president.)	10 December 2019	4 years, 0 days	2015	PRO (Cambiemos)	First president elected in a ballotage.	Gabriela Michetti	
	(Presidency); Alberto Fernández (born 1959)	10 December 2019	10 December 2023	4 years, 0 days	2019	PJ (FdT)		Cristina Fernández de Kirchner	
	(Presidency); Javier Milei (born 1970)	10 December 2023	Incumbent	2 years, 335 days	2023	PL ↓ LLA	First libertarian head of state in the world.	Victoria Villarruel	

== Timeline of head of states of Argentina by individual ==
This is a graphical lifespan timeline of the heads of state of Argentina. They are listed in order of first assuming office.

The following chart lists heads of state by lifespan (living heads of state on the green line), with the years outside of their tenure in beige. Heads of state with an unknown birth date or death date are shown with only their tenure or their earlier or later life.

The following chart shows heads of state by their age (living heads of state in green), with the years of their tenure in blue. The vertical black line at 30 years indicates the minimum age to be president.

== Timeline of head of states of Argentina by affiliation ==
Directors
Rosas
Urquiza
Mitre
Sarmiento
Avellaneda
Roca
Celman
Roca
Alcorta
│
1810
│
1820
│
1830
│
1840
│
1850
│
1860
│
1870
│
1880
│
1890
│
1900
│
1910
S. Peña
Yrigoyen
Alvear
Justo
Ortiz
Perón
Alfonsín
Menem
FdlR
NK
CFK
│
1910
│
1920
│
1930
│
1940
│
1950
│
1960
│
1970
│
1980
│
1990
│
2000
│
2010
CFK
Macri
AF
Milei
│
2010
│
2020
│
2030
│
2040
│
2050
│
2060
│
2070
│
2080
│
2090
│
2100
│
2110

== See also ==
- President of Argentina
- Politics of Argentina
- List of vice presidents of Argentina
- Lists of office-holders

== Bibliography ==
- Mendelevich, Pablo (2010). El Final (in Spanish). Buenos Aires: Ediciones B. ISBN 978-987-627-166-0.
- Rosa, José María (1974). Historia Argentina (in Spanish). Buenos Aires: Editorial Oriente S.A.
- Abal Medina (h.), Juan; Suárez Cao, Julieta (August 2003). "Análisis crítico del sistema electoral argentino. Evolución histórica y desempeño efectivo". Revista de Ciencias Sociales (in Spanish). 14. Bernal: National University of Quilmes.
