= List of vice presidents of Argentina =

The vice president of Argentina (Spanish: Vicepresidente de Argentina), officially known as the vice president of the Argentine Nation (Spanish: Vicepresidente de la Nación Argentina), is the second highest political position in Argentina, and first in the line of succession to the president of Argentina.

The official coat of arms of Argentina.

A list of the vice presidents follows, including de facto vice presidents during military regimes and vacant periods. The current vice president of Argentina is Victoria Villarruel.

== List of vice presidents ==
=== Argentine Confederation (1854–1861) ===
Portrait	Name (Birth–Death)	Term of office		Elections	Political party	President	Notes
Portrait	Name (Birth–Death)	Start	End	Elections	Political party	President	Notes
	Salvador María del Carril (1798–1883)	5 March 1854	5 March 1860	1853	Unitarian	Justo José de Urquiza	
	Juan Esteban Pedernera (1796–1886)	5 March 1860	4 November 1861	1859	Unitarian	Santiago Derqui	Assumed the presidency after the resignation of Santiago Derqui.
Vacant; 4 November 1861 – 12 December 1861						Juan Esteban Pedernera	Juan Esteban Pedernera resigned.

=== Argentine Republic (1861–present) ===
	Portrait	Name (Birth–Death)	Term of office		Elections	Political party (Coalition)	President	Notes
	Portrait	Name (Birth–Death)	Start	End	Elections	Political party (Coalition)	President	Notes
Vacant; 12 December 1861 – 12 October 1862							Bartolomé Mitre	
		Marcos Paz (1811–1868)	12 October 1862	2 January 1868	1862	Liberal	Bartolomé Mitre	Acting president between 12 June 1865 and 2 January 1868. Died in office.
Vacant; 2 January 1868 – 12 October 1868							Bartolomé Mitre	
		Adolfo Alsina (1829–1877)	12 October 1868	12 October 1874	1868	Autonomist	Domingo Sarmiento	
		Mariano Acosta (1825–1893)	12 October 1874	12 October 1880	1874	PAN	Nicolás Avellaneda	
		Francisco Bernabé Madero (1816–1896)	12 October 1880	12 October 1886	1880	PAN	Julio Argentino Roca	
		Carlos Pellegrini (1846–1906)	12 October 1886	6 August 1890	1886	PAN	Miguel Juárez Celman	Assumed the presidency after the resignation of Miguel Juárez Celman.
Vacant; 6 August 1890 – 12 October 1892							Carlos Pellegrini	
		José Evaristo Uriburu (1831–1914)	12 October 1892	22 January 1895	1892	PAN	Luis Sáenz Peña	Assumed the presidency after the resignation of Luis Sáenz Peña.
Vacant; 22 January 1895 – 12 October 1898							José Evaristo Uriburu	
		Norberto Quirno Costa (1844–1915)	12 October 1898	12 October 1904	1898	PAN	Julio Argentino Roca	
		José Figueroa Alcorta (1860–1931)	12 October 1904	12 March 1906	1904	PAN - Modernist	Manuel Quintana	Acting president between 25 January 1906 and 12 March 1906. Assumed the presidency after the death of Manuel Quintana.
Vacant; 12 March 1906 – 12 October 1910							José Figueroa Alcorta	
		Victorino de la Plaza (1840–1919)	12 October 1910	9 August 1914	1910	PAN	Roque Sáenz Peña	Assumed the presidency after the death of Roque Sáenz Peña.
Vacant; 9 August 1914 – 12 October 1916							Victorino de la Plaza	
		Pelagio Luna (1867–1919)	12 October 1916	25 June 1919	1916	UCR	Hipólito Yrigoyen	Died in office.
Vacant; 25 June 1919 – 12 October 1922							Hipólito Yrigoyen	
		Elpidio González (1875–1951)	12 October 1922	12 October 1928	1922	UCR	Marcelo Torcuato de Alvear	
–		Francisco Beiró (1876–1928)	Died before taking office		1928	UCR	Hipólito Yrigoyen	Died before taking office.
		Enrique Martínez (1887–1938)	12 October 1928	6 September 1930	1928	UCR	Hipólito Yrigoyen	Acting president between 5 and 6 September 1930. Ousted from office by a coup d'état.
		Enrique Santamarina (1870–1937)	6 September 1930	20 October 1930	—	—	José Félix Uriburu	Resigned.
Vacant; 20 October 1930 – 20 February 1932							José Félix Uriburu	
		Julio Argentino Pascual Roca (1873–1942)	20 February 1932	20 February 1938	1931	PDN (Concordancia)	Agustín Pedro Justo	
		Ramón Castillo (1873–1944)	20 February 1938	27 June 1942	1937	PDN (Concordancia)	Roberto María Ortiz	Acting president between 3 July 1940 and 27 June 1942. Assumed the presidency after the resignation of Roberto María Ortiz.
Vacant; 27 June 1942 – 7 June 1943							Ramón Castillo	
Vacant; 27 June 1942 – 7 June 1943							Arturo Rawson	Beginning of the Revolution of '43.
		Sabá Sueyro (1889–1943)	7 June 1943	15 October 1943	—	Military	Pedro Pablo Ramírez	Died in office.
		Edelmiro Julián Farrell (1887–1980)	15 October 1943	9 March 1944	—	Military	Pedro Pablo Ramírez	Acting president between 25 February 1944 and 9 March 1944. Assumed the presidency after the resignation of Pedro Pablo Ramírez.
Vacant; 9 March 1944 – 8 July 1944							Edelmiro Julián Farrell	
		Juan Perón (1895–1974)	8 July 1944	10 October 1945	—	Military	Edelmiro Julián Farrell	Removed from office.
		Juan Pistarini (1882–1956)	10 October 1945	4 June 1946	—	Military	Edelmiro Julián Farrell	End of the Revolution of '43.
		Hortensio Quijano (1884–1952)	4 June 1946	3 April 1952	1946	UCR-JR	Juan Perón	Died in office.
		Hortensio Quijano (1884–1952)	Died before taking office		1951	Peronist	Juan Perón	Reelected in 1951, but died before taking office on 4 June 1952.
Vacant; 3 April 1952 – 7 May 1954							Juan Perón	
		Alberto Teisaire (1891–1963)	7 May 1954	16 September 1955	1954	Peronist	Juan Perón	Elected in the only vice-presidential election in the country. Ousted from office by the Revolución Libertadora.
Vacant; 16 September 1955 – 23 September 1955							Juan Perón	
Vacant; 16 September 1955 – 23 September 1955							Eduardo Lonardi	
		Isaac Rojas (1906–1993)	23 September 1955	1 May 1958	—	Military	Eduardo Lonardi	
		Isaac Rojas (1906–1993)	23 September 1955	1 May 1958	—	Military	Pedro Eugenio Aramburu	End of the Revolución Libertadora.
		Alejandro Gómez (1908–2005)	1 May 1958	18 November 1958	1958	UCR-I	Arturo Frondizi	Resigned.
Vacant; 18 November 1958 – 12 October 1963							Arturo Frondizi	
Vacant; 18 November 1958 – 12 October 1963							José María Guido	
		Carlos Humberto Perette (1915–1992)	12 October 1963	28 June 1966	1963	UCR-P	Arturo Umberto Illia	Ousted from office by a coup d'état.
Vacant; 28 June 1966 – 25 May 1973							Argentine Revolution	Military dictatorship.
		Vicente Solano Lima (1901–1984)	25 May 1973	13 July 1973	March; 1973	PCP (FREJULI)	Héctor José Cámpora	Resigned along with president Héctor José Cámpora.
Vacant; 13 July 1973 – 12 October 1973							Raúl Alberto Lastiri	
		Isabel Perón (born 1931)	12 October 1973	1 July 1974	Sept. 1973	PJ (FREJULI)	Juan Perón	Acting president between 29 June 1974 and 1 July 1974. Assumed the presidency after the death of Juan Perón.
Vacant; 1 July 1974 – 10 December 1983							Isabel Perón	
Vacant; 1 July 1974 – 10 December 1983							National Reorganization Process	Military dictatorship.
		Víctor Hipólito Martínez (1924–2017)	10 December 1983	8 July 1989	1983	UCR	Raúl Alfonsín	
		Eduardo Duhalde (born 1941)	8 July 1989	10 December 1991	1989	PJ (FREJUPO)	Carlos Menem	Resigned to become Governor of Buenos Aires Province.
Vacant; 10 December 1991 – 8 July 1995							Carlos Menem	
		Carlos Ruckauf (born 1944)	8 July 1995	10 December 1999	1995	PJ	Carlos Menem	
		Carlos Álvarez (born 1948)	10 December 1999	6 October 2000	1999	Broad Front (Alianza)	Fernando de la Rúa	Resigned.
Vacant; 6 October 2000 – 25 May 2003							Fernando de la Rúa	
Vacant; 6 October 2000 – 25 May 2003							Rodríguez Saá	
Vacant; 6 October 2000 – 25 May 2003							Duhalde	
		Daniel Scioli (born 1957)	25 May 2003	10 December 2007	2003	PJ (FPV)	Néstor Kirchner	
		Julio Cobos (born 1955)	10 December 2007	10 December 2011	2007	UCR (FPV)	Cristina Fernández de Kirchner	
		Amado Boudou (born 1962)	10 December 2011	10 December 2015	2011	PJ (FPV)	Cristina Fernández de Kirchner	
		Gabriela Michetti (born 1965)	10 December 2015	10 December 2019	2015	PRO (Cambiemos)	Mauricio Macri	Although her mandate begun on 10 December 2015 midnight, it was only after she swore in the Congress at 11:45 that she took office as Vice President.
		Cristina Fernández de Kirchner (born 1953)	10 December 2019	10 December 2023	2019	PJ (FdT)	Alberto Fernández	Previously served as First Lady of Argentina (2003–2007) and President of Argentina (2007–2015).
		Victoria Villarruel (born 1975)	10 December 2023	Incumbent	2023	PD (LLA)	Javier Milei	

=== Affiliation keys ===
Abbreviation	Party name (English)	Party name (Spanish)
Unitarian	Unitarian	Unitarios
Liberal	Liberal Party	Partido Liberal
Autonomist	Autonomist Party	Partido Autonomista
PAN	National Autonomist Party	Partido Autonomista Nacional
PAN-Modernist	National Autonomist Party - Modernist Line	Partido Autonomista Nacional - Línea Modernista
UCR	Radical Civic Union	Unión Cívica Radical
PDN	National Democratic Party	Partido Demócrata Nacional
Concordancia	Concordancia	Concordancia
Military	Armed Forces of the Argentine Republic	Fuerzas Armadas de la República Argentina
UCR-JR	Radical Civic Union Renewal Board	Unión Cívica Radical Junta Renovadora
Peronist	Peronist Party	Partido Peronista
UCR-I	Intransigent Radical Civic Union	Unión Cívica Radical Intransigente
UCR-P	People's Radical Civic Union	Unión Cívica Radical del Pueblo
PCP	Conservative People's Party	Partido Conservador Popular
PJ	Justicialist Party	Partido Justicialista
FREJULI	Justicialist Liberation Front	Frente Justicialista de Liberación
FREJUPO	Justicialist Front of Popular Unity	Frente Justicialista de Unidad Popular
Broad Front	Broad Front	Frente Grande
Alianza	Alliance for Work, Justice and Education	Alianza para el Trabajo, la Justicia y la Educación
FPV	Front for Victory	Frente para la Victoria
PRO	Republican Proposal	Propuesta Republicana
Cambiemos	Let's Change	Cambiemos
FdT	Everyone's Front	Frente de Todos
LLA	Liberty Advances	La Libertad Avanza
PD	Democratic Party	Partido Demócrata

== See also ==
- Politics of Argentina
- President of Argentina
  - List of heads of state of Argentina
- List of current vice presidents
