= 1868 Argentine presidential election =

← 1862	12 April 1868	1874 →
- Presidential election
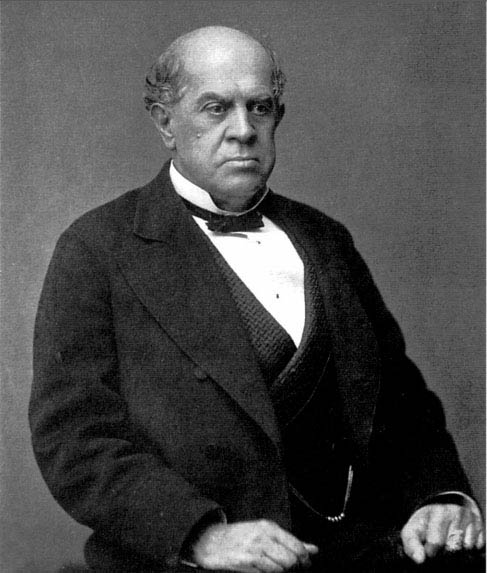

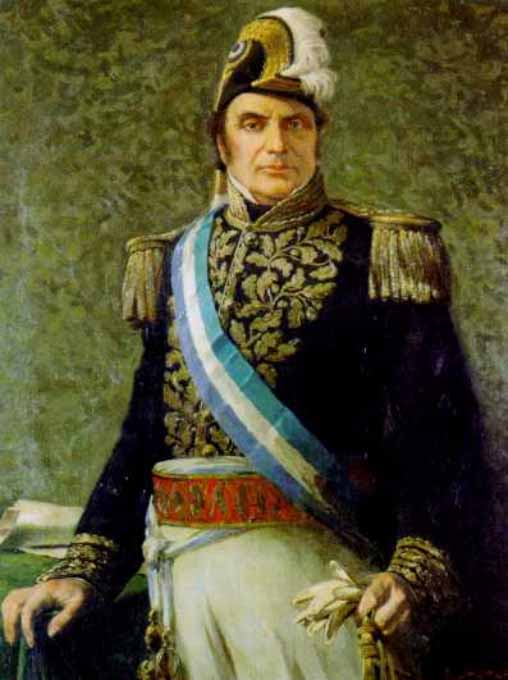

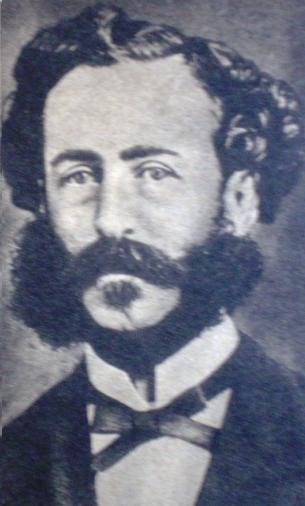
Nominee	Domingo Faustino Sarmiento	Justo José de Urquiza	Rufino de Elizalde
Party	Independent	Federalist	Nationalist
Electoral vote	79	26	22
Percentage	60.31%	19.85%	16.79%
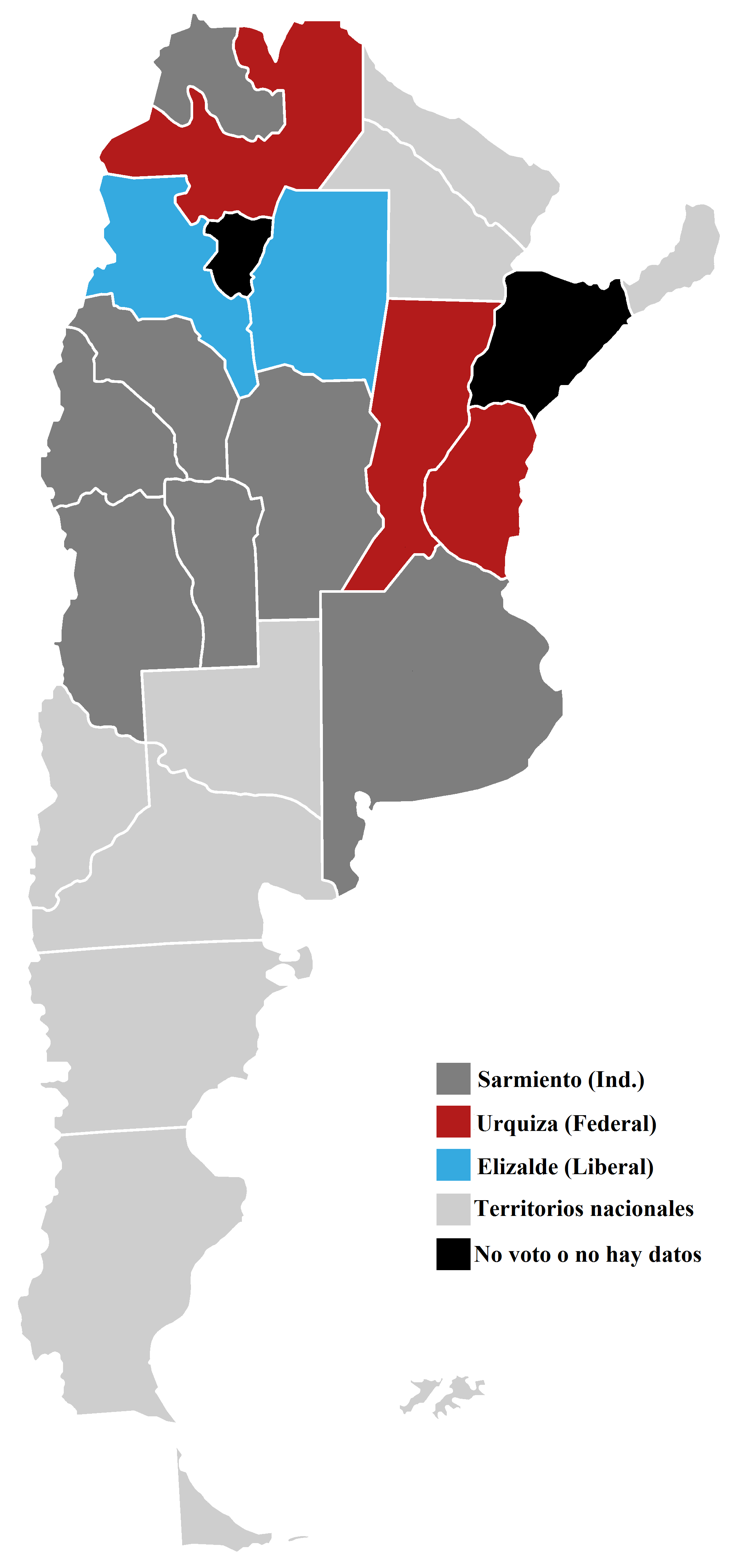
- Results by province
President before election
Bartolomé Mitre
Nationalist
Elected President
Domingo Faustino Sarmiento
Independent

Presidential elections were held in Argentina on 12 April 1868 to choose the president of Argentina. Domingo Faustino Sarmiento was elected.

== Background ==
Presiding over a prosperous economy overshadowed somewhat by the costly Paraguayan War, President Mitre was at pains to avoid risking the tenuous national unity his administration had secured. Though he hand-picked prospective candidates, Mitre avoided the appearance of direct support for any one figure, while limiting the field to those he considered acceptable. Electors from Buenos Aires Province favored Autonomist Party candidate Adolfo Alsina, who was instead persuaded by Mitre to run for the vice-presidency. The nomination was handed to the Ambassador to the United States, Domingo Sarmiento, who remained at his post and did not campaign. Mitre also supported former Unitarian Party leader Rufino de Elizalde and his running mate General Wenceslao Paunero, a key figure in Mitre's victory at the Battle of Pavón. These candidates were all preferred by the president over that year's dark horse, former President Justo José de Urquiza (whom Mitre attempted to dissuade from running for fear of the separatist conflict his presence might provoke).

These candidates were, with the exception of Sarmiento, contentious in many circles and provided the new system its first real test. The electoral college met on 12 April 1868, and selected Sarmiento by 79 out of 131 votes, making this the only closely contested race during this era.

== Results ==
=== President ===
Candidate	Party	Votes	%
Domingo Faustino Sarmiento	Independent	79	60.31
Justo José de Urquiza	Federalist Party	26	19.85
Rufino de Elizalde	Nationalist Party	22	16.79
Guillermo Rawson	Nationalist Party	3	2.29
Dalmacio Vélez Sarsfield	Nationalist Party	1	0.76
Total		131	100.00
Registered voters/turnout		156	–

==== By province ====
Province	Sarmiento	Urquiza	de Elizalde	Rawson	Vélez Sarsfield
Buenos Aires	24			3	1
Catamarca			10		
Córdoba	16				
Corrientes	Did not vote				
Entre Ríos		8			
Jujuy	7				
La Rioja	6				
Mendoza	10				
Salta		10			
San Juan	8				
San Luis	8				
Santa Fe		8			
Santiago del Estero			12		
Tucumán	Votes not preserved				
Total	79	26	22	3	1

=== Vice president ===
Candidate	Party	Votes	%
Adolfo Alsina	Autonomist Party	82	62.60
Wenceslao Paunero	Nationalist Party	45	34.35
Manuel Anselmo Ocampo	Independent	2	1.53
Juan Bautista Alberdi	Independent	1	0.76
Francisco de las Carreras	Independent	1	0.76
Total		131	100.00
Registered voters/turnout		156	–

==== By province ====
Province	Alsina	Paunero	Ocampo	Alberdi	de las Carreras
Buenos Aires	25		2		1
Catamarca		10			
Córdoba	3	13			
Corrientes	Did not vote				
Entre Ríos	8				
Jujuy	4	3			
La Rioja	6				
Mendoza	10				
Salta	10				
San Juan	8				
San Luis	8				
Santa Fe		7		1	
Santiago del Estero		12			
Tucumán	Votes not preserved				
Total	82	45	2	1	1
