= 1859 Argentine presidential election =

← 1853	5, 6 and 7 September 1859	1862 →
- Presidential election
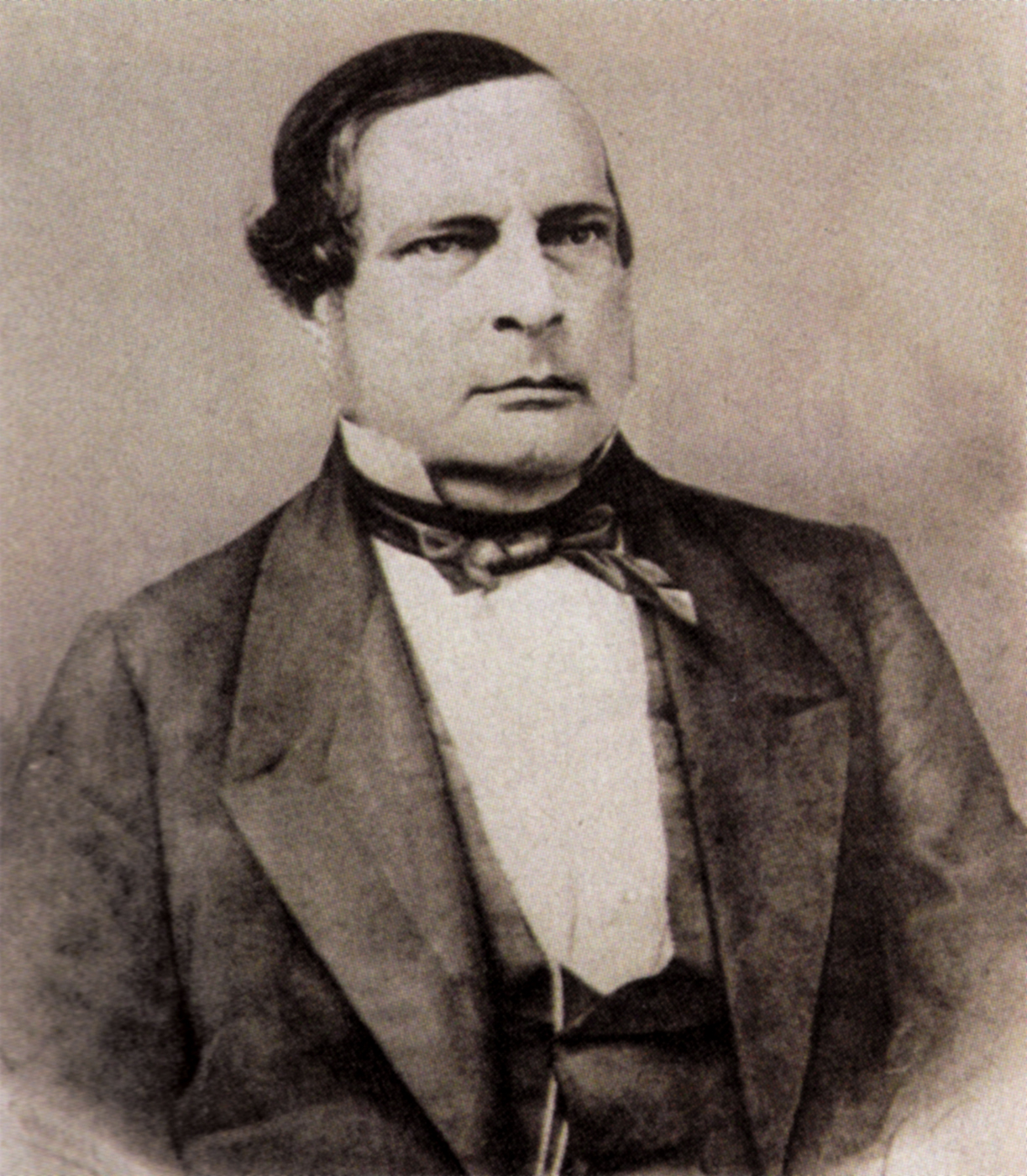

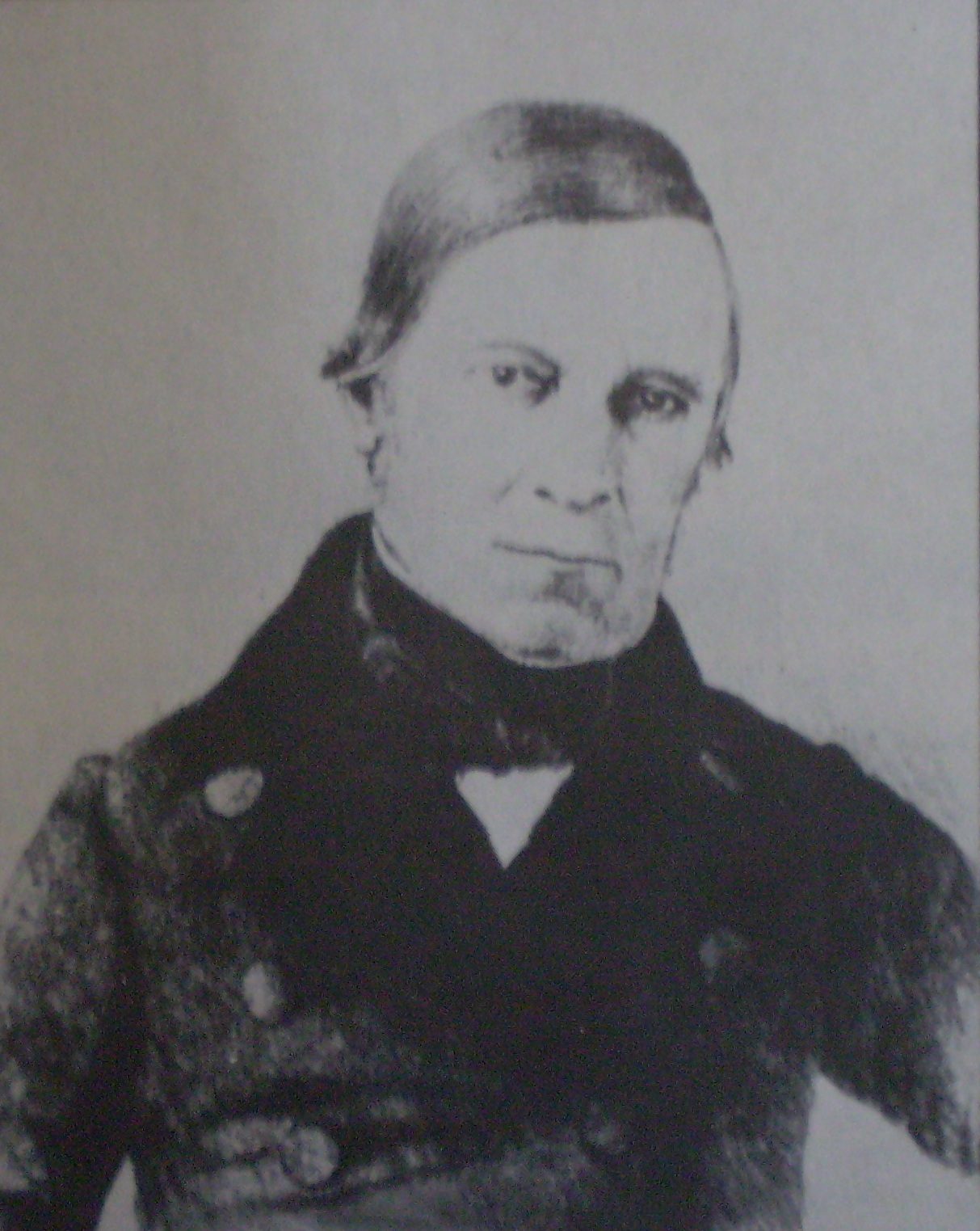
Nominee	Santiago Derqui	Mariano Fragueiro
Party	Federalist	Unitarian
Electoral vote	72	46
Percentage	57.60%	36.80%
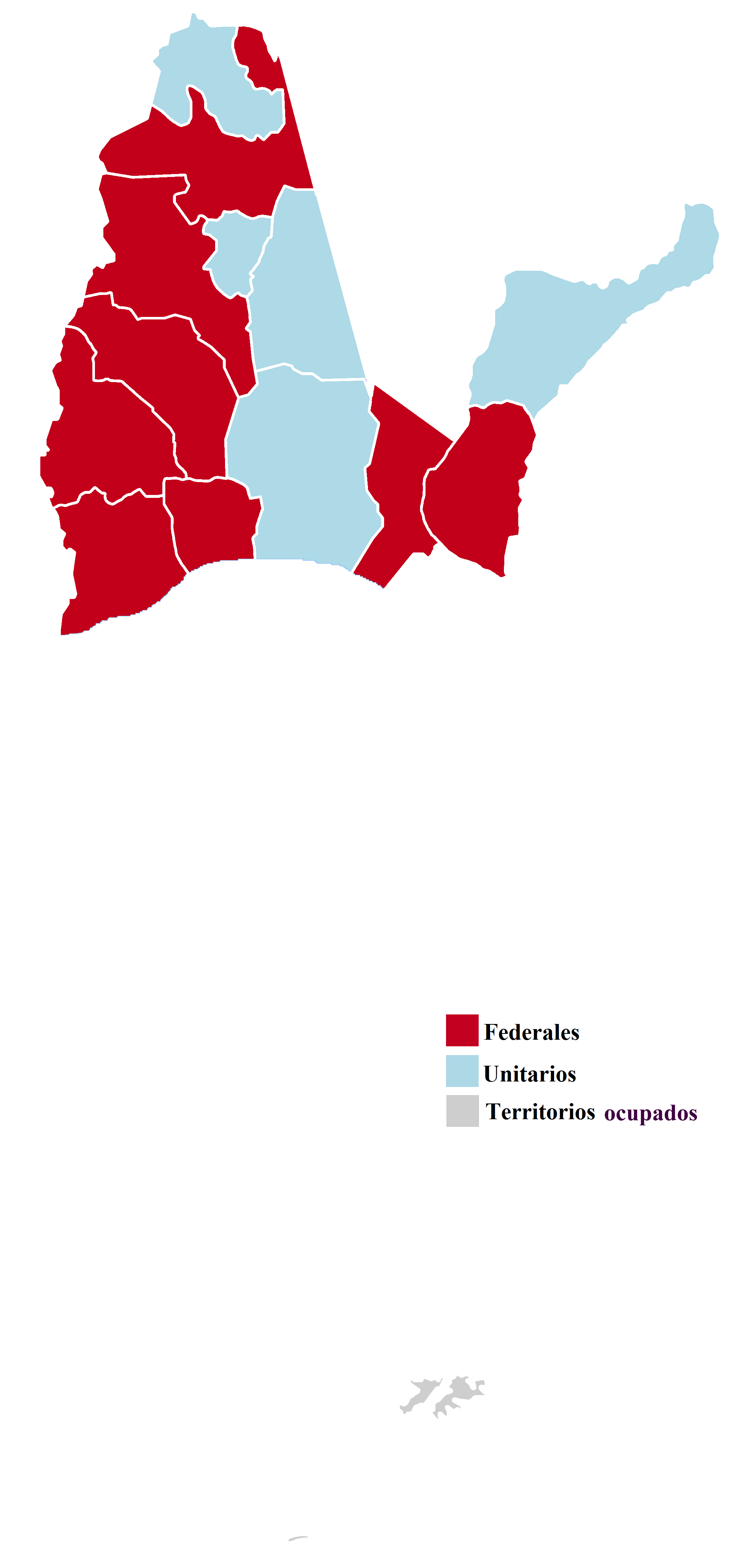
- Results by province
President before election
Justo José de Urquiza
Federalist
Elected President
Santiago Derqui
Federalist

Presidential elections were held in Argentina on 5, 6 and 7 September 1859 to choose the second president of the Argentine Confederation. Santiago Derqui was elected president.

The Buenos Aires Province seceded from the Confederation as the State of Buenos Aires on 11 September 1852 and did not participate in elections until 1862.

== Results ==
=== President ===
Candidate	Party	Votes	%
Santiago Derqui	Federalist Party	72	57.60
Mariano Fragueiro	Unitarian Party	46	36.80
Salvador María del Carril	Unitarian Party	4	3.20
Juan Bautista Alberdi	Independent	2	1.60
Tomás Guido	Independent	1	0.80
Total		125	100.00

==== By province ====
Province	Derqui	Fragueiro	del Carril	Alberdi	Guido
Catamarca	10				
Córdoba		16			
Corrientes	12				
Federal Territory of Entre Ríos	6			2	
Jujuy		8			
La Rioja	8				
Mendoza	8				
Salta	6		4		
San Juan	8				
San Luis	8				
Santa Fe	6				1
Santiago del Estero		12			
Tucumán		10			
Total	72	46	4	2	1

=== Vice president ===
As none of the candidates obtained the majority of voters required by the constitution, Congress elected the vice president.

Candidate	Party	Electoral vote		Congress vote	
Candidate	Party	Votes	%	Votes	%
Marcos Paz	Independent	49	39.20	22	40.74
Juan Esteban Pedernera	Unitarian Party	45	36.00	32	59.26
Benjamín Virasoro	Federalist Party	17	13.60		
Juan Gregorio Pujol	Federalist Party	12	9.60		
Juan Bautista Alberdi	Independent	1	0.80		
Santiago Derqui	Federalist Party	1	0.80		
Total		125	100.00	54	100.00

==== By province ====
Province	Paz	Pedernera	Virasoro	Pujol	Alberdi	Derqui
Catamarca		10				
Córdoba	15				1	
Corrientes				12		
Federal Territory of Entre Ríos		8				
Jujuy	8					
La Rioja		8				
Mendoza		7	1			
Salta	4	5				1
San Juan			8			
San Luis			8			
Santa Fe		7				
Santiago del Estero	12					
Tucumán	10					
Total	49	45	17	12	1	1
