= 1880 Argentine presidential election =

← 1874	11 April 1880	1886 →
- Presidential election
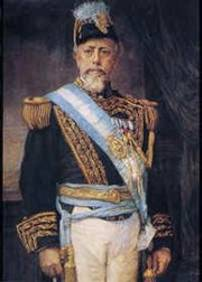

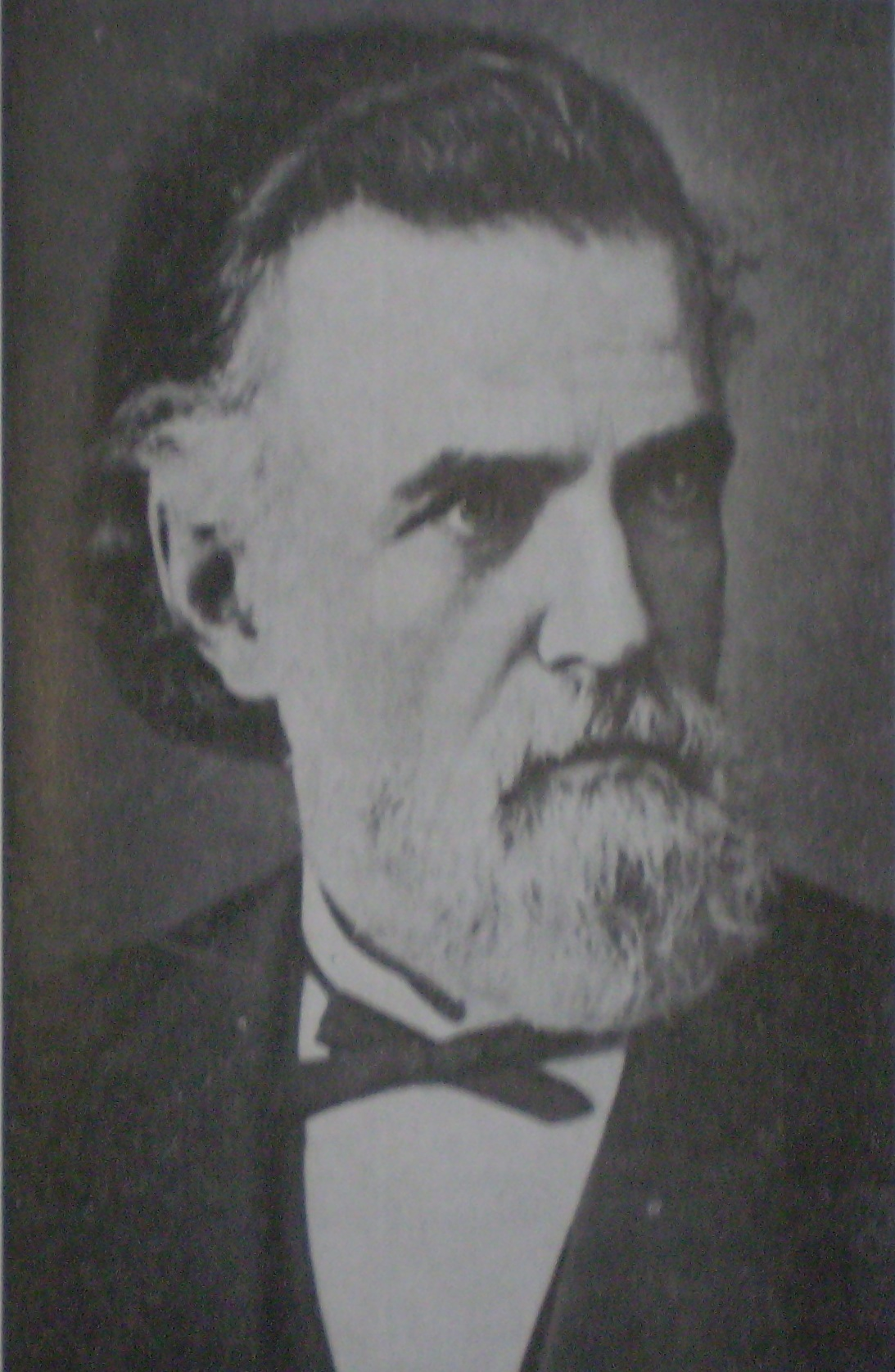
Nominee	Julio Argentino Roca	Carlos Tejedor
Party	PAN	Independent
Electoral vote	155	70
Percentage	68.89%	31.11%
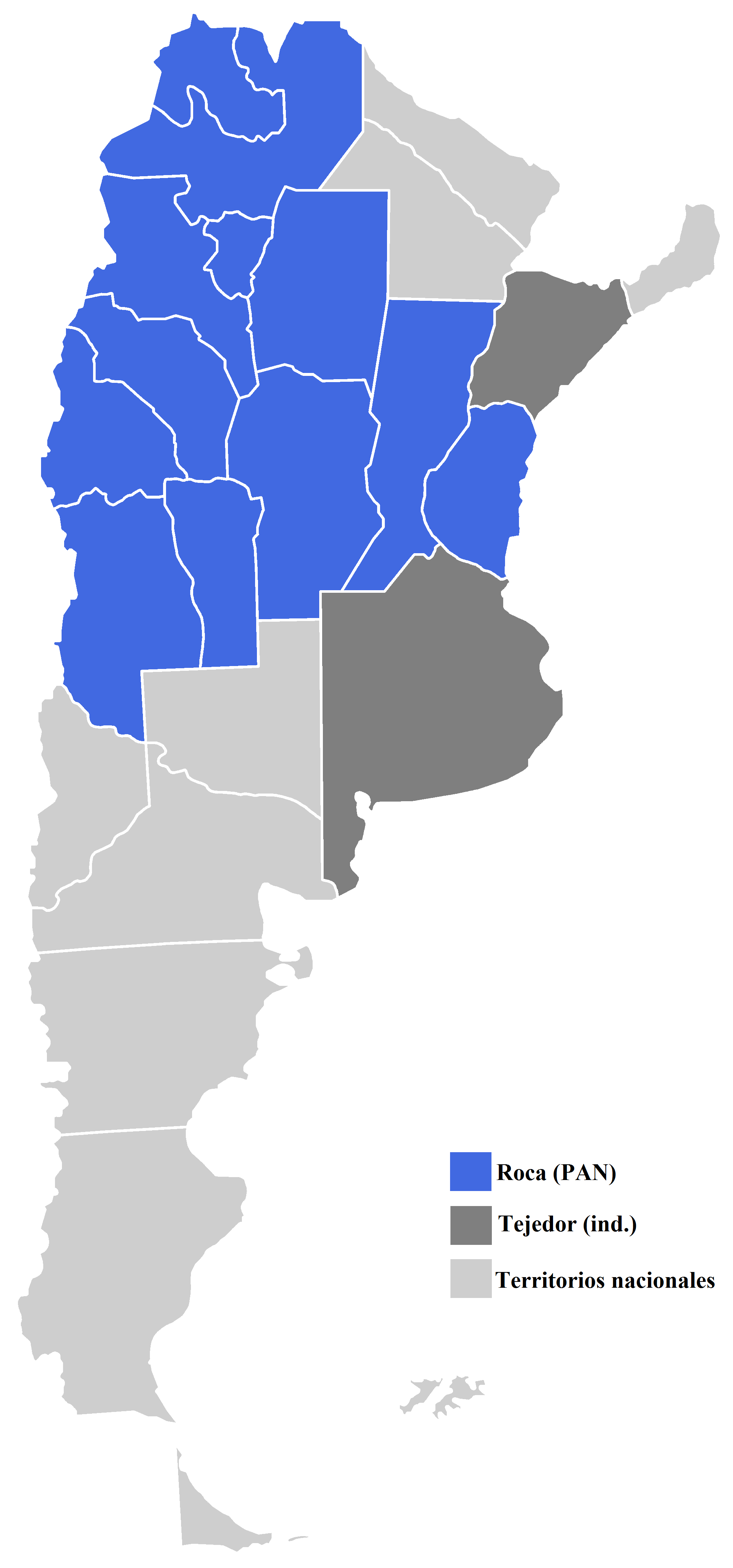
- Results by province
President before election
Nicolás Avellaneda
PAN
Elected President
Julio Argentino Roca
PAN

Presidential elections were held in Argentina on 11 April 1880. Julio Argentino Roca was elected.

== Background ==
A leader of the Conquest of the Desert, as well as of the suppression of Mitre's 1874 uprising and others, outgoing president Nicolás Avellaneda had decided on General Julio Roca as his successor early on. Memories of Mitre's defeat did not sit well with Buenos Aires separatists, and this faction nominated the Governor of Buenos Aires Province, Carlos Tejedor.

== Results ==
=== President ===
Candidate	Party	Votes	%
Julio Argentino Roca	National Autonomist Party	155	68.89
Carlos Tejedor	Independent	70	31.11
Total		225	100.00
Registered voters/turnout		228	–

=== Vice president ===
Candidate	Party	Votes	%
Francisco Bernabé Madero	National Autonomist Party	151	67.41
Saturnino María Laspiur	Independent	70	31.25
Bernardo de Irigoyen	Independent	3	1.34
Total		224	100.00
Registered voters/turnout		228	–

== Aftermath ==
Roca's election by the electoral college was followed by Tejedor's armed insurrection, and though the latter was defeated, Mitre brokered negotiations between Tejedor's separatists and the national government. These negotiations eventually result in the Federalization of Buenos Aires in September, stabilizing the powerful province's position within Argentina.
