= Francisco de las Carreras =

Argentine judge

President of the Supreme Court of Justice, Argentina
- In office June 1, 1863 – 1870
- Preceded by: S/D
- Constituency: Argentina

Minister of the Supreme Court of Justice, Argentina
- In office January 15, 1863 – June 1, 1863

Personal details
- Born: 1809 Buenos Aires, Viceroyalty of the Rio de la Plata
- Died: 1870 (aged 60–61) Argentina, Buenos Aires, Argentina
- Citizenship: Argentina
- Occupation: Lawyer

Francisco de las Carreras (1809–1870) was an Argentine lawyer, judge and politician. He was the first President of the Supreme Court of Argentina between 1863 and 1870.

== Career ==
De las Carreras did his higher studies in Law at the University of Buenos Aires, turning to politics during the government of Juan Manuel de Rosas. He was Minister of Finance for the Province of Buenos Aires during the 1850s.

In January 1863, when the president of Argentina, Bartolomé Mitre formed the first Supreme Court, he was appointed its Minister. But after Valentín Alsina's refusal to take over as chief justice, he was appointed chief justice on June 1, 1863, a position he held until his death.

A street in the city of Mar de Ajo is named in his honor. In Buenos Aires, Argentine largest city, exists a street named in his honor too. In this location the name of the street is: Santiago Francisco de las Carreras.
