= Rufino de Elizalde =

Argentine politician

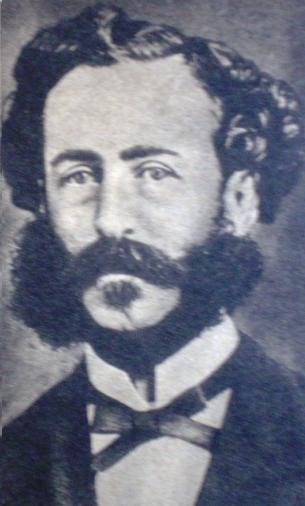
Dr Rufino de Elizalde.

Dr. Rufino de Elizalde (August 1822, Buenos Aires – March 1887) was an Argentine politician who was Foreign Affairs Minister of Argentina in 1865.
