= 1910 Argentine general election =

13 March 1910
- Presidential election

300 members of the Electoral College 151 votes needed to win

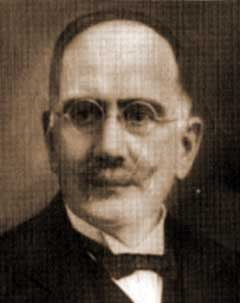
Nominee	Roque Sáenz Peña	Adolfo Contte
Party	PAN	Liberal
Electoral vote	265	1
Percentage	99.62%	0.38%
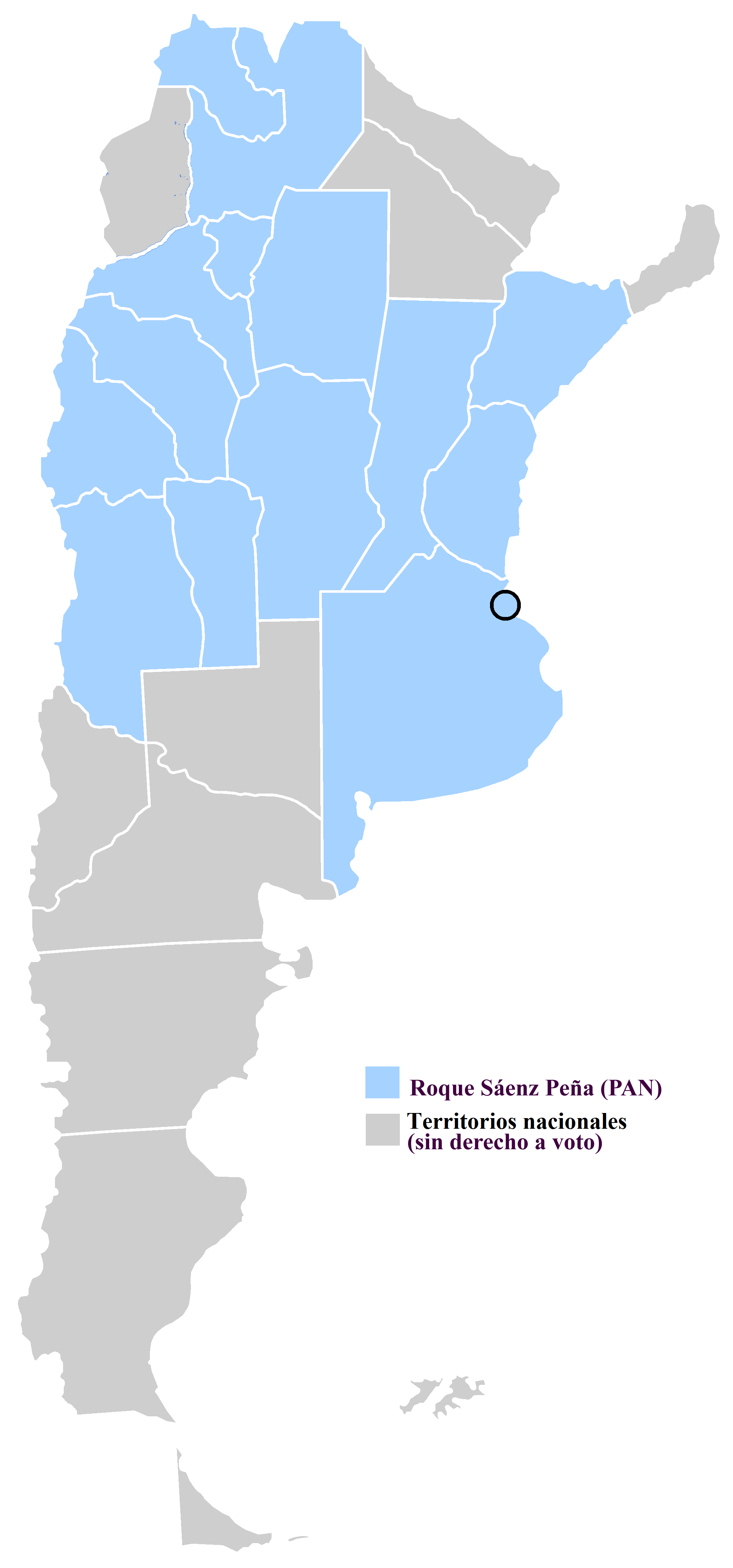
- Results by province
President before election
José Figueroa Alcorta
PAN
Elected President
Roque Sáenz Peña
PAN
- Legislative election
- 63 of the 120 seats in the Chamber of Deputies
Party	Seats
National Autonomist Party and allies	63
This lists parties that won seats. See the complete results below.

General elections were held in Argentina on 13 March 1910 to elect the president and 63 of 120 seats in the Chamber of Deputies. Roque Sáenz Peña was elected president.

== Background ==
The ailing president Quintana's death in 1906 was the beginning of the end of Roca dominance of national politics and policy. Moderate opposition to the PAN had greatly eroded its majorities in Congress, the very day the president died, and within months, Bartolomé Mitre and Carlos Pellegrini were dead, as well. President José Figueroa Alcorta defied Roca by signing many of Congressman Palacios' labor law reform bills and by 1909, Figueroa Alcorta was poised to nominate the reformist who had been turned away in 1892: Roque Sáenz Peña.

Other prominent conservatives, such as La Nación publisher Emilio Mitre and Buenos Aires Governor Marcelino Ugarte, presented token candidacies. Sáenz Peña, who was the Ambassador to Italy and did not campaign, was selected unanimously on April 12, 1910. He promptly began negotiations with UCR leader Hipólito Yrigoyen for the introduction of legislation providing for the secret ballot. The president struggled over the bill with a still-conservative Congress, and on 10 February 1912, the Senate narrowly passed Law 8871. Providing for free and fair elections, as well as for the country's first uniform system of voter registration, the Sáenz Peña Law brought the prolonged "vote song" to an end.

== Results ==
=== President ===
Although 265 electors voted for Roque Sáenz Peña, in the final count he appears with 264 votes.

Candidate	Party	Votes	%
Roque Sáenz Peña	National Autonomist Party	265	99.62
Adolfo Contte	Liberal Party of Corrientes	1	0.38
Total		266	100.00
Registered voters/turnout		300	–

==== By province ====
Province	Sáenz Peña	Contte
Buenos Aires City	41	
Buenos Aires	49	
Catamarca	9	
Córdoba	24	
Corrientes	16	1
Entre Ríos	19	
Jujuy	6	
La Rioja	7	
Mendoza	12	
Salta	12	
San Juan	10	
San Luis	10	
Santa Fe	25	
Santiago del Estero	9	
Tucumán	16	
Total	265	1

=== Vice president ===
Although 262 electors voted for Victorino de la Plaza, in the final count he appears with 259 votes.

Candidate	Party	Votes	%
Victorino de la Plaza	National Autonomist Party	262	98.50
Indalecio Gómez	Independent	2	0.75
Manuel María de Iriondo	Radical Civic Union	1	0.38
Valentín Virasoro	Liberal Party of Corrientes	1	0.38
Total		266	100.00
Registered voters/turnout		300	–

==== By province ====
Province	de la Plaza	Gómez	de Iriondo	Virasoro
Buenos Aires City	41			
Buenos Aires	49			
Catamarca	9			
Córdoba	21	2	1	
Corrientes	16			1
Entre Ríos	19			
Jujuy	6			
La Rioja	7			
Mendoza	12			
Salta	12			
San Juan	10			
San Luis	10			
Santa Fe	25			
Santiago del Estero	9			
Tucumán	16			
Total	262	2	1	1

=== Chamber of Deputies ===
The National Autonomist Party and its allies won all 63 seats.
