= 1886 Argentine presidential election =

← 1880	11 April 1886	1892 →
- Presidential election
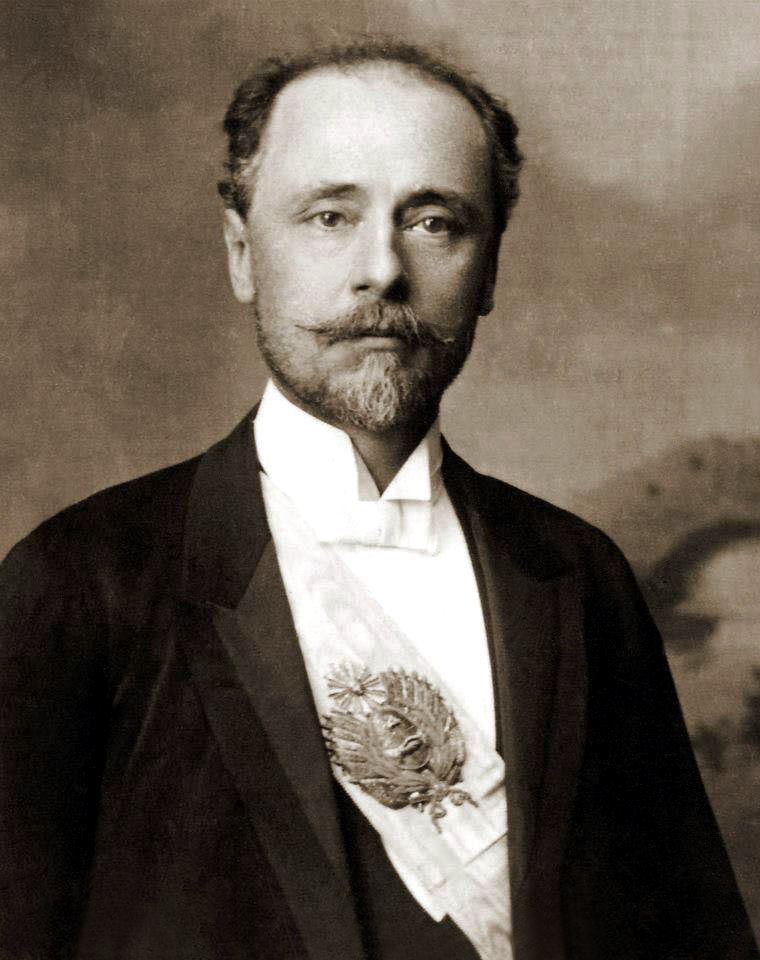

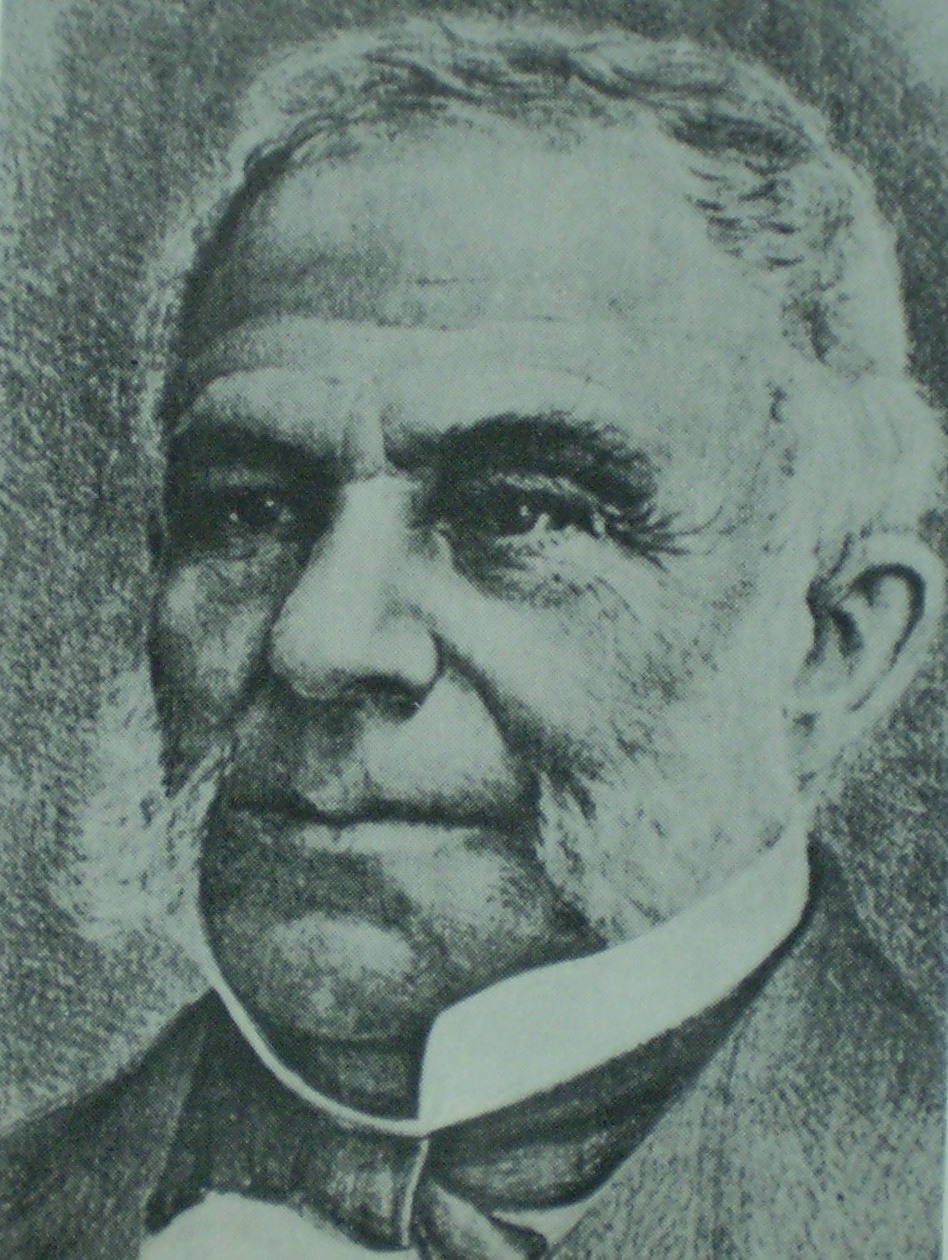

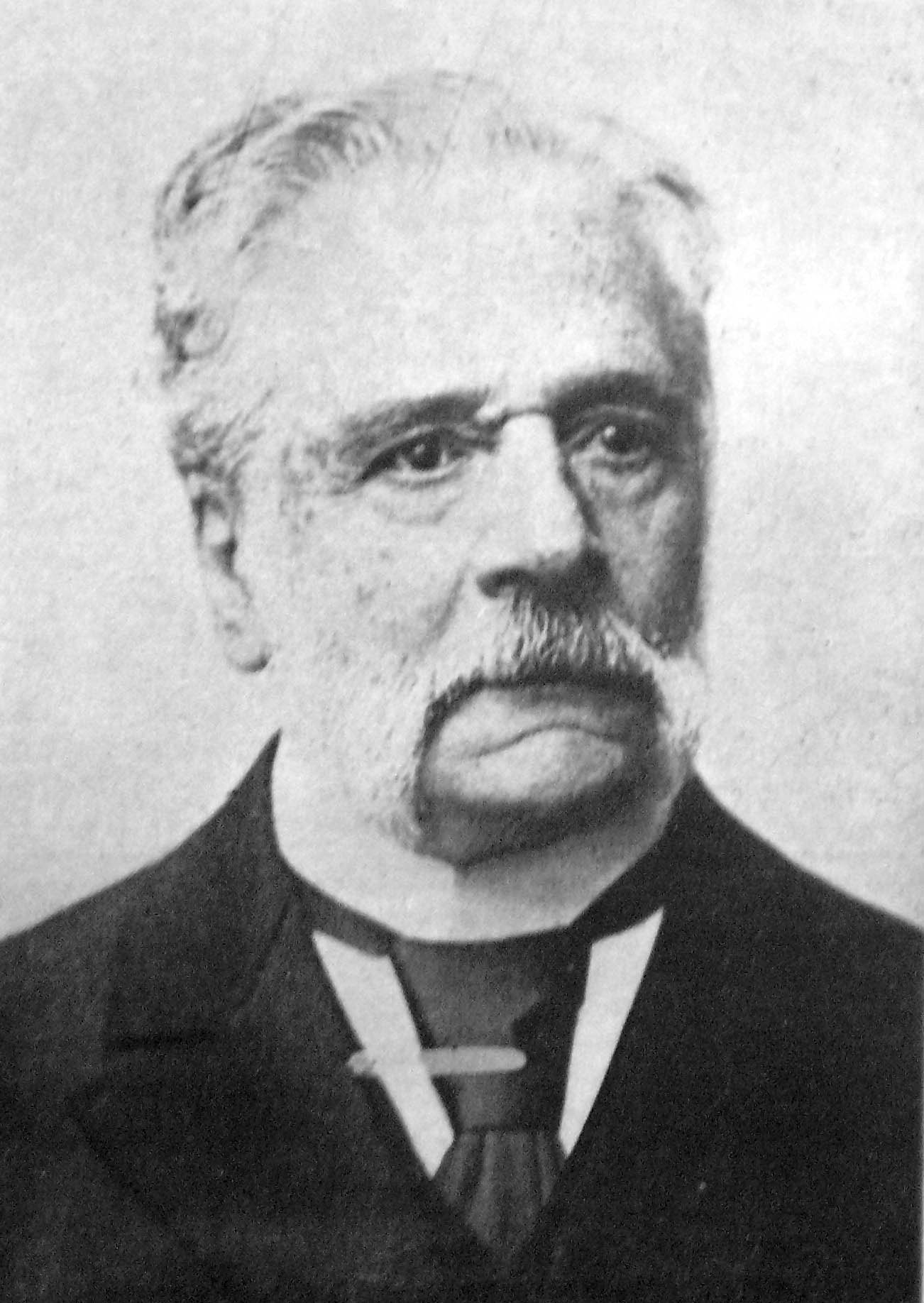
Nominee	Miguel Ángel Juárez	Manuel Anselmo Ocampo	Bernardo de Irigoyen
Party	PAN	PU	PU
Running mate		Rafael García
Electoral vote	168	32	13
Percentage	78.9%	15%	6.1%
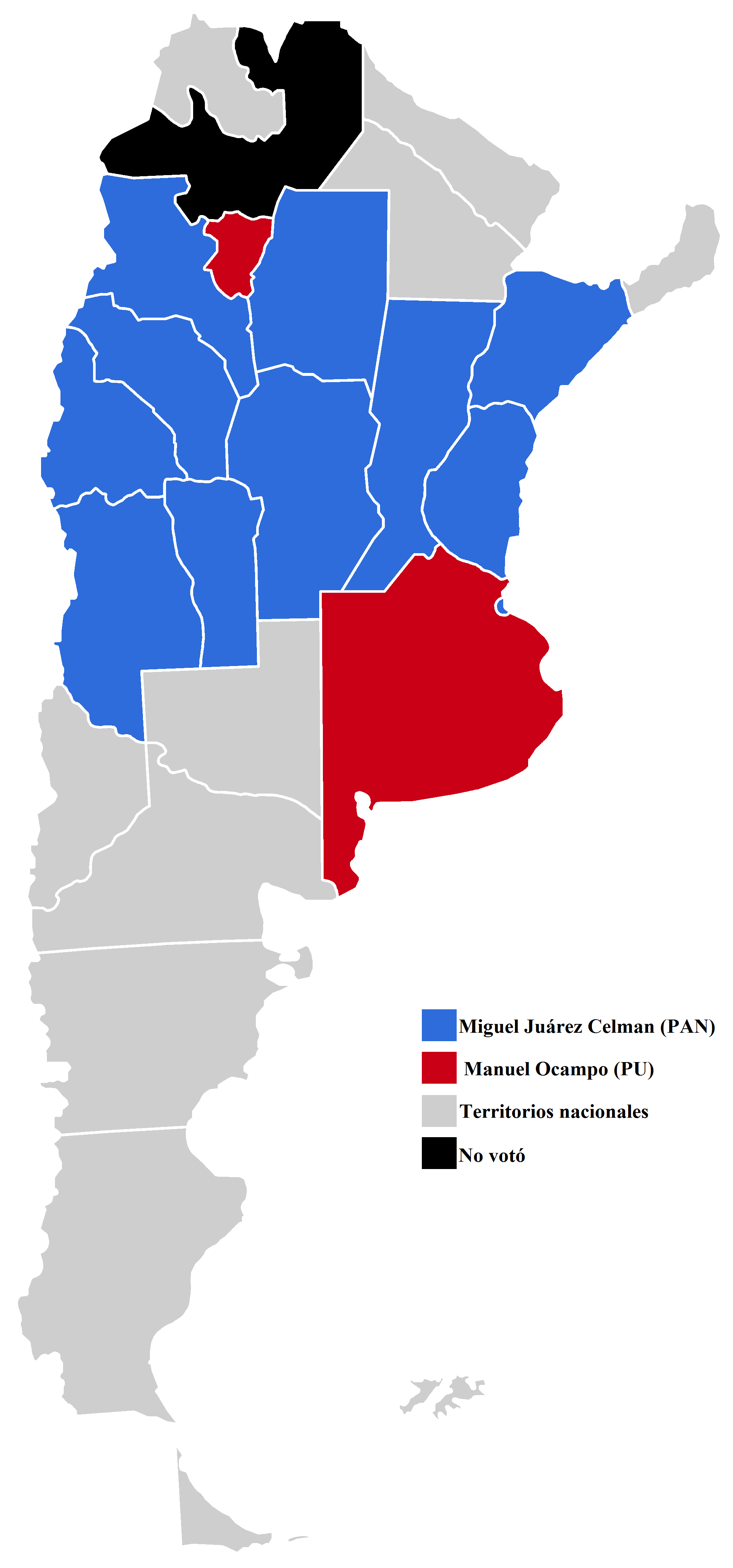
- Results by province
President before election
Julio Argentino Roca
PAN
Elected President
Miguel Ángel Juárez
PAN

Presidential elections were held in Argentina on 11 April 1886. Miguel Ángel Juárez was elected president.

== Background ==
Confident of his authority following six years of peace and prosperity, President Roca was by then known for his shrewdness as "the fox." Enjoying the support of the agricultural elites - as well as of the London financial powerhouse, Barings Bank - Roca daringly fielded his son-in-law, Córdoba Province Governor Miguel Ángel Juárez, as the PAN candidate for president. A number of distinguished candidates appeared, including Buenos Aires Governor Dardo Rocha and Foreign Minister Bernardo de Irigoyen. Roca tolerated no opposition against his dauphin, however, who was selected nearly unanimously on 11 April 1886.

== Results ==
=== President ===
Candidate	Party	Votes	%
Miguel Ángel Juárez	National Autonomist Party	168	78.87
Manuel Anselmo Ocampo	United Parties	32	15.02
Bernardo de Irigoyen	United Parties	13	6.10
Total		213	100.00
Registered voters/turnout		232	–

==== By province ====
Province	Juárez Celman	Ocampo	Irigoyen
Buenos Aires City	22		
Buenos Aires		31	
Catamarca	12		
Córdoba	26		
Corrientes	15		
Entre Ríos	18		
Jujuy	8		
La Rioja	8		
Mendoza	10		
Salta	Did not vote		
San Juan	10		
San Luis	10		
Santa Fe	11		
Santiago del Estero	18		
Tucumán		1	13
Total	168	32	13

=== Vice president ===
Candidate	Party	Votes	%
Carlos Pellegrini	National Autonomist Party	179	84.04
Rafael García	United Parties	28	13.15
Luis Sáenz Peña	United Parties	3	1.41
Bartolomé Mitre	United Parties	3	1.41
Total		213	100.00
Registered voters/turnout		232	–

==== By province ====
Province	Pellegrini	García	Sáenz Peña	Mitre
Buenos Aires City	22			
Buenos Aires		28		3
Catamarca	12			
Córdoba	26			
Corrientes	15			
Entre Ríos	18			
Jujuy	8			
La Rioja	8			
Mendoza	10			
Salta	Did not vote			
San Juan	10			
San Luis	10			
Santa Fe	11			
Santiago del Estero	18			
Tucumán	11		3	
Total	179	28	3	3
