= 1904 Argentine presidential election =

- 10 April 1904
- Presidential election

300 members of the Electoral College 151 votes needed to win
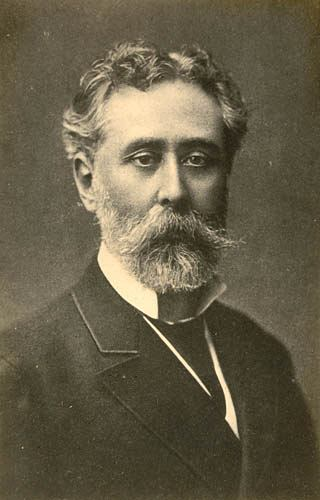

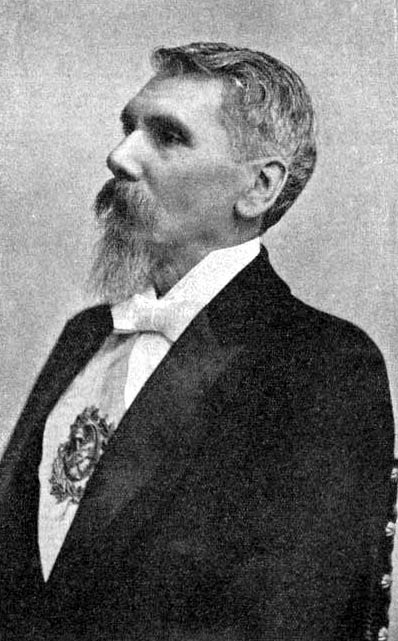
Nominee	Manuel Quintana	José Evaristo Uriburu
Party	PAN	Republican
Electoral vote	240	34
Percentage	81.36%	11.53%
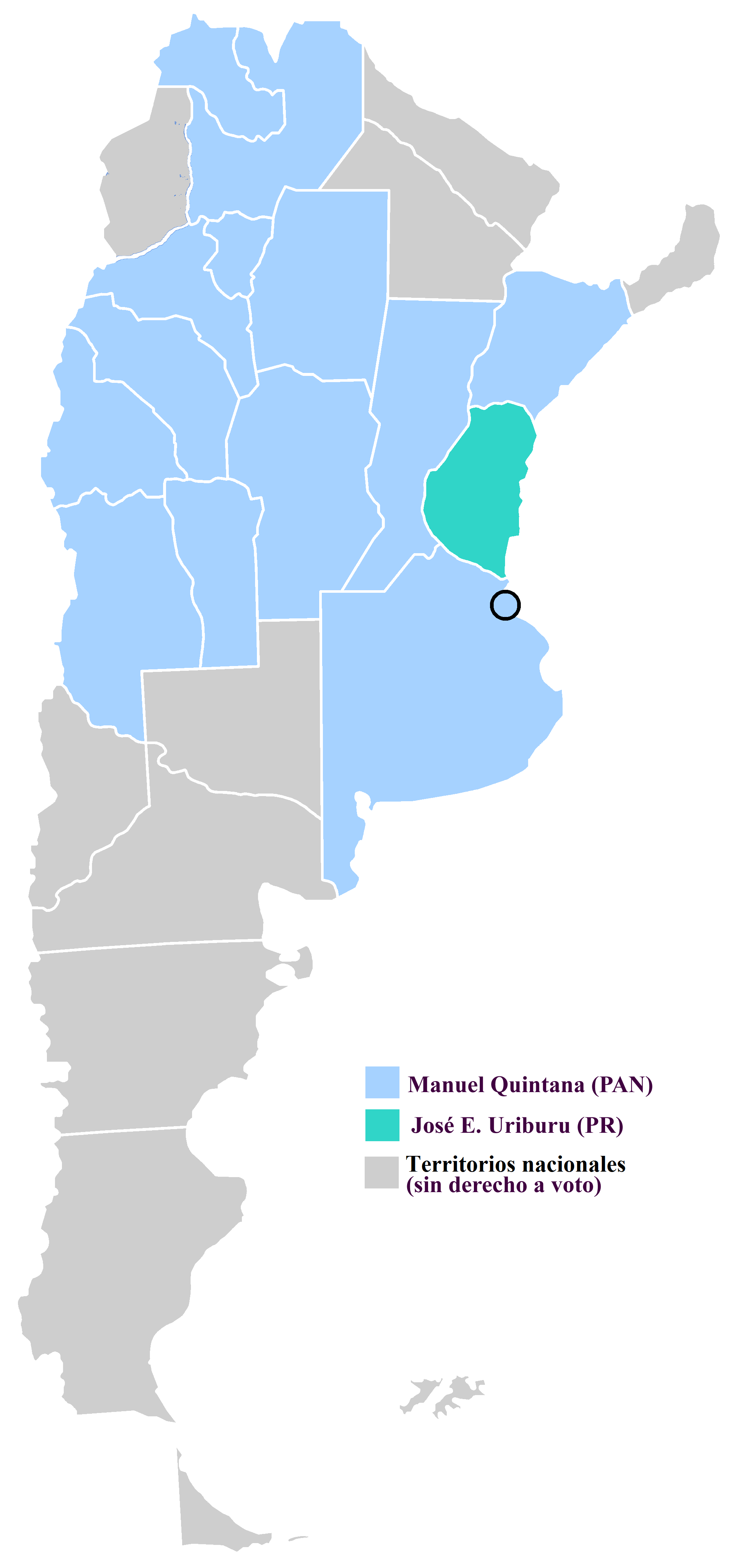
- Results by province
President before election
Julio Argentino Roca
PAN
Elected President
Manuel Quintana
PAN

Presidential elections were held in Argentina on 10 April 1904. Manuel Quintana was elected president.

== Background ==
Riding high after another term of prosperity and important diplomatic accomplishments such as the May 1902 Pact with neighboring Chile over a border dispute and Foreign Minister Luis Drago's settlement of imminent war between the German Empire and Venezuela, President Roca enlisted Congressman Manuel Quintana as the PAN standard bearer. Within the PAN itself, some dissent was evident over Roca's dominance. These voices rallied behind former Presidents Carlos Pellegrini (as an Autonomist) and José Evaristo Uriburu (as a Republican). The UCR maintained its boycott, and the aging Quintana was selected by the electoral college on 12 June 1904.

The year's legislative elections were more historically significant than the headline presidential selection: the Buenos Aires district of La Boca elected Alfredo Palacios, the first Socialist Congressman in the Western Hemisphere.

== Results ==
=== President ===
Candidate	Party	Votes	%
Manuel Quintana	National Autonomist Party	240	81.36
José Evaristo Uriburu	Republican Party	34	11.53
Marco Aurelio Avellaneda	National Autonomist Party	14	4.75
Mauricio Pastor Daract	Independent	6	2.03
Carlos Pellegrini	National Autonomist Party	1	0.34
Total		295	100.00
Registered voters/turnout		300	–

==== By province ====
Province	Quintana	J. E. Uriburu	Avellaneda	Daract	Pellegrini
Buenos Aires City	18	12	13		1
Buenos Aires	60				
Catamarca	9				
Córdoba	23				
Corrientes	18				
Entre Ríos		22			
Jujuy	8				
La Rioja	8				
Mendoza	12				
Salta	12				
San Juan	10				
San Luis	10				
Santa Fe	28				
Santiago del Estero	12		1		
Tucumán	12			6	
Total	240	34	14	6	1

=== Vice president ===
Candidate	Party	Votes	%
José Figueroa Alcorta	National Autonomist Party	257	87.12
Guillermo Udaondo	National Civic Union	12	4.07
Luis María Drago	National Autonomist Party	11	3.73
Juan José Romero	Radical Civic Union	6	2.03
Francisco Uriburu	National Autonomist Party	5	1.69
Joaquín V. González	National Autonomist Party	1	0.34
Benjamín Victorica	National Autonomist Party	1	0.34
Carlos Pellegrini	National Autonomist Party	1	0.34
Benito Villanueva	National Autonomist Party	1	0.34
Total		295	100.00
Registered voters/turnout		300	–

==== By province ====
Province	Alcorta	Udaondo	Drago	Romero	F. Uriburu	González	Victorica	Pellegrini	Villanueva
Buenos Aires City	21	12	11						
Buenos Aires	60								
Catamarca	9								
Córdoba	22					1			
Corrientes	18								
Entre Ríos	21						1		
Jujuy	3				5				
La Rioja	8								
Mendoza	11							1	
Salta	12								
San Juan	9								1
San Luis	10								
Santa Fe	28								
Santiago del Estero	13								
Tucumán	12			6					
Total	257	12	11	6	5	1	1	1	1
