= 1853 Argentine presidential election =

- 1 November 1853
- Presidential election
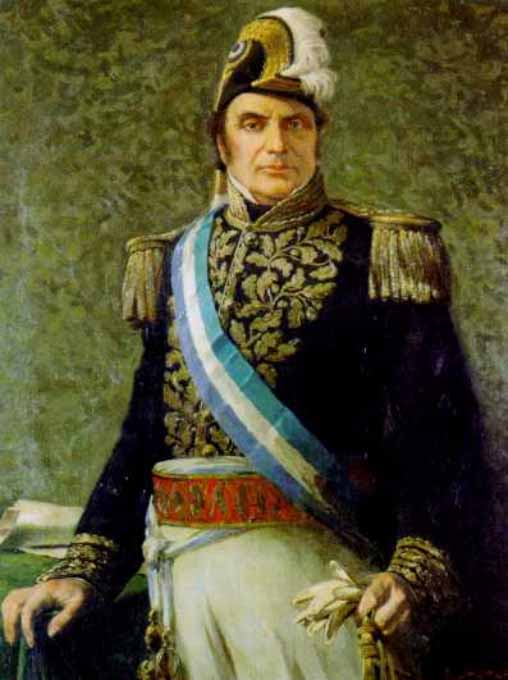

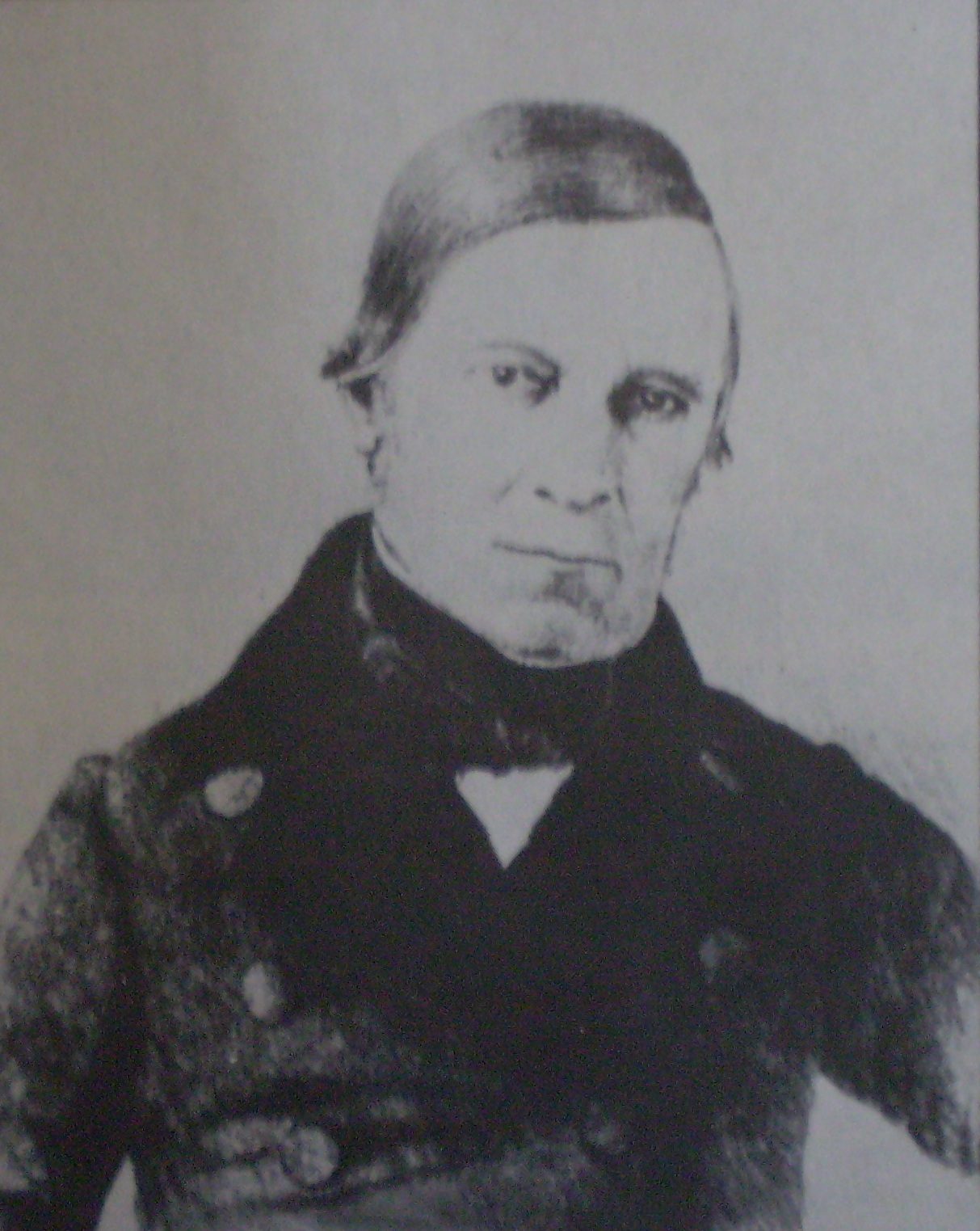
Nominee	Justo José de Urquiza	Mariano Fragueiro
Party	Federalist	Unitarian
Electoral vote	91 (Note: Although only 91 electors voted for Urquiza, in the final count he appears with 94 votes.)	7
Percentage	88.35%	6.80%
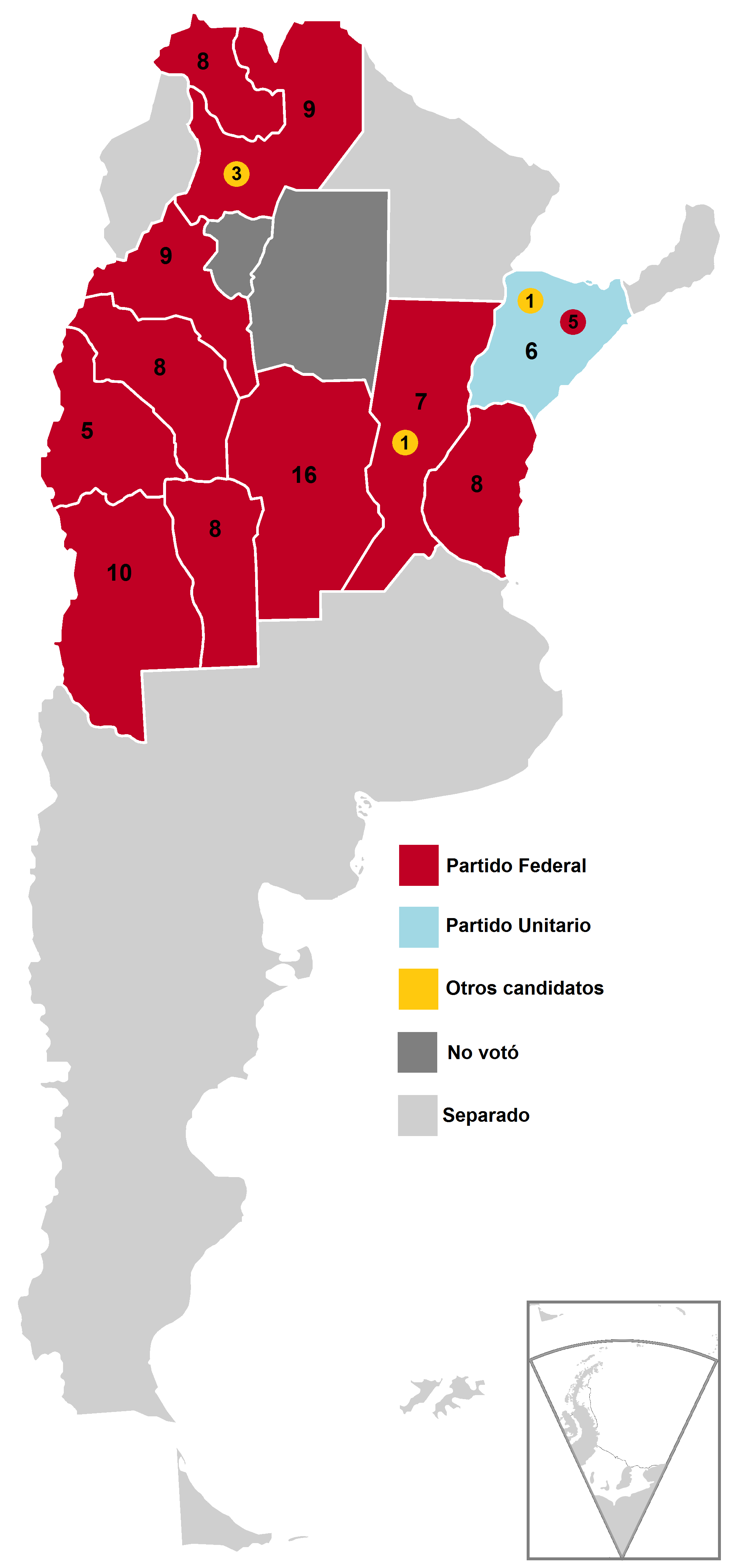
- Results by province
President before election
Justo José de Urquiza
(As Provisional Director of the Argentine Confederation)
Federalist
Elected President
Justo José de Urquiza
Federalist

Presidential elections were held in Argentina on 1 November 1853 to choose the first president of the Argentine Confederation for the period 1854–1860. Justo José de Urquiza was elected president by a wide margin.

It was the first presidential election after the unification of the country in 1852, after Urquiza defeated Juan Manuel de Rosas at the Battle of Caseros on 3 February 1852. The State of Buenos Aires seceded on 11 September 1852 and did not participate in elections until 1862.

== Results ==
=== President ===
Although only 91 electors voted for Urquiza, in the final count he is listed as having 94 votes.

Candidate	Party	Votes	%
Justo José de Urquiza	Federalist Party	91	88.35
Mariano Fragueiro	Unitarian Party	7	6.80
Pedro Ferré	Federalist Party	1	0.97
Vicente López y Planes	Independent	1	0.97
José María Paz	Unitarian Party	1	0.97
Benjamín Virasoro	Federalist Party	1	0.97
Facundo Zuviría	Unitarian Party	1	0.97
Total		103	100.00
Registered voters/turnout		106	–

==== By province ====
Province	Urquiza	Fragueiro	Ferré	López y Planes	Paz	Virasoro	Zuviría
Catamarca	9	1					
Córdoba	16						
Corrientes	5	6					1
Entre Ríos	8						
Jujuy	8						
La Rioja	8						
Mendoza	10						
Salta	7		1	1	1		
San Juan	5						
San Luis	8						
Santa Fe	7					1	
Santiago del Estero	Did not vote						
Tucumán	Did not vote						
Total	91	7	1	1	1	1	1

=== Vice president ===
As none of the candidates obtained the majority of voters required by the constitution, Congress elected the vice president.

Candidate	Party	Electoral vote		Congress vote	
Candidate	Party	Votes	%	Votes	%
Salvador María del Carril	Unitarian Party	35	33.02	17	94.44
Facundo Zuviría	Unitarian Party	22	20.75	1	5.56
Mariano Fragueiro	Unitarian Party	20	18.87		
Rudecindo Alvarado	Unitarian Party	13	12.26		
Benjamín Virasoro	Federalist Party	8	7.55		
Juan Bautista Alberdi	Independent	7	6.60		
Pedro Ferré	Federalist Party	1	0.94		
Total		106	100.00	18	100.00

==== By province ====
Province	del Carril	Zuviría	Fragueiro	Alvarado	Virasoro	Alberdi	Ferré
Catamarca		1		9			
Córdoba	10		6				
Corrientes	1	3	3			5	
Entre Ríos		5		2		1	
Jujuy	5		3				
La Rioja		8					
Mendoza	10						
Salta	2	4		2		1	1
San Juan	7	1					
San Luis					8		
Santa Fe			8				
Santiago del Estero	Did not vote						
Tucumán	Did not vote						
Total	35	22	20	13	8	7	1
