= Juan Esteban Pedernera =

3rd President of the Argentine Confederation

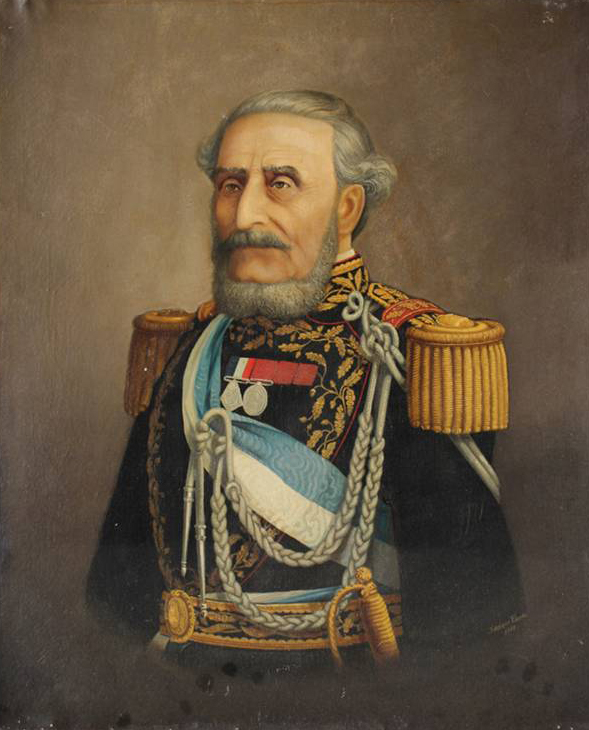

5th President of Argentina
- In office November 5, 1861 – December 12, 1861
- Preceded by: Santiago Derqui
- Succeeded by: Bartolomé Mitre
- Vice President: Vacant

2nd Vice President of Argentina
- In office March 5, 1860 – November 5, 1861
- President: Santiago Derqui
- Preceded by: Salvador María del Carril
- Succeeded by: Marcos Paz

Personal details
- Born: December 25, 1796 San José del Morro, San Luis Province, Viceroyalty of the Río de la Plata
- Died: February 1, 1886 (aged 89) Buenos Aires, Argentina
- Spouse: Rosa Juana Heredia
- Relations: Juan Esteban (father); Dominga Pedernera (mother)
- Profession: Military

Juan Esteban Pedernera (December 25, 1796 – February 1, 1886) was interim President of Argentina during a brief period in 1861.

Born in 1796 in San Luis Province, he studied in a Franciscan monastery when young, and left his studies to join the Regiment of Mounted Grenadiers being summoned by José de San Martín to fight in the War of Independence against Spanish rule. In 1815, he fought in the Battles of Chacabuco and Battle of Maipú, in Chile; and then in the campaign to liberate Peru. He was imprisoned by the Spanish during the former campaign in Chiloé Island, but managed to escape and rejoin his army.

Lieutenant-general Juan Esteban Pedernera married the former Rosa Juana Heredia in Callao on September 23, 1823; she was born in Perú, in 1805, and died in Buenos Aires, on August 26, 1886.

In 1826 engaged again in military activity, this time in the Cisplatine War. In the Argentine Civil War, he joined the Unitarian side, under the command of General José María Paz, and fought in La Tablada against federalist forces. After a long time in exile, he returned to the country after the fall of the Rosas' regime, and acted as Senator for San Luis Province. In 1856, he was designated commander of the frontier armed forces, and in 1859 he was elected Governor of San Luis, and fought at the Battle of Cepeda that same year.

He then was elected Vice-President to President of the Argentine Confederation Santiago Derqui, and served from 1860 until 1861, when Derqui resigned after the Battle of Pavón. Pedernera then acted as President until the political situation forced the dissolution of the office. In 1882 he was designated Lieutenant General of the Armies of the Republic.

== See also ==
- Argentine War of Independence
- Argentine Confederation
- Battle of Caseros

Political offices
Preceded by Salvador María del Carril	Vice President of Argentina; 1860-1861	Succeeded by Marcos Paz
Preceded by Santiago Derqui	President of Argentina; 1861	Succeeded by Bartolomé Mitre
