= 1862 Argentine presidential election =

← 1859	27, 28 and 29 July 1862	1868 →
- Presidential election
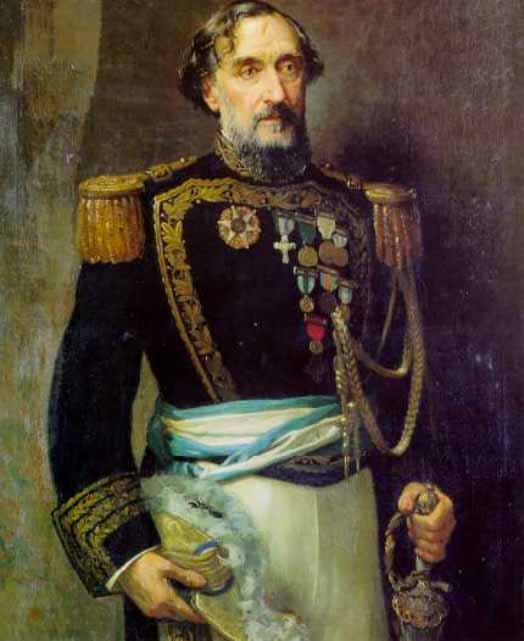
Nominee	Bartolomé Mitre
Party	Liberal
Electoral vote	133
Percentage	100%
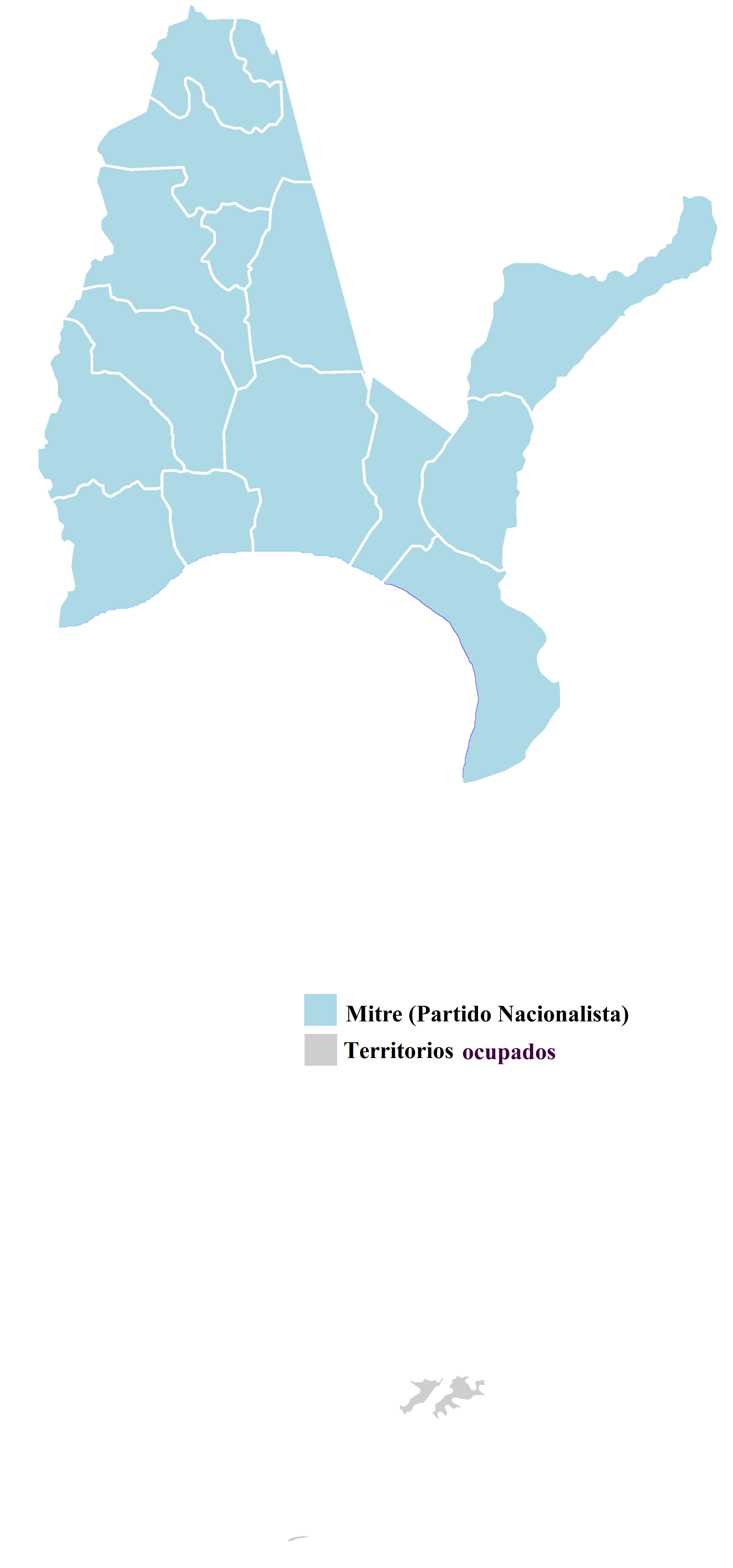
President before election
Bartolomé Mitre
(Acting President and Governor of Buenos Aires)
Liberal
Elected President
Bartolomé Mitre
Liberal

Presidential elections were held in Argentina on July 1862 to choose the first president of Argentina. Bartolomé Mitre was elected.

== Background ==
These elections were all indirectly decided in the electoral college, and not reflective of popular vote (whose turnout averaged 10% of male suffrage). The cosmetic nature of this electoral system, which became known locally as the voto cantado (the "vote song," for its predetermined script), resulted from a period of intermittent civil wars between those who favored a united Argentina with a strong central government (Unitarians) and Buenos Aires Province leaders who favored an independent nation of their own (Federalists). These conflicts had dominated local political life since 1820, and did not immediately subside with the enactment of the Argentine Constitution of 1853.

The military guarantor of the Argentine Confederation, General Justo José de Urquiza, lost control over his appointed successor, Santiago Derqui, and this led Buenos Aires Governor Bartolomé Mitre to take up arms in defense of autonomy against what he saw as Derqui's reneging on their 1860 gentlemen's agreement. Victorious at the 1861 Battle of Pavón, Mitre obtained important concessions from the national army - notably the amendment of the Constitution to provide for indirect elections through an electoral college comprised - by design - somewhat disproportionately of electors from the nation's hinterland provinces.

A skilled negotiator, Mitre placated restive sentiment in Buenos Aires and Entre Ríos Provinces (where separatist sentiment was highest), and nominated Marcos Paz, a Federalist and former Mitre foe, as his running mate. Arranging an electoral college election on 4 September 1862, he and Paz received the body's unanimous support.

== Results ==
=== President ===
Candidate	Party	Votes	%
Bartolomé Mitre	Liberal Party	133	100.00
Total		133	100.00
Registered voters/turnout		156	–

==== By province ====
Province	Mitre
Buenos Aires	25
Catamarca	Did not vote
Córdoba	12
Corrientes	11
Entre Ríos	8
Jujuy	7
La Rioja	6
Mendoza	9
Salta	9
San Juan	8
San Luis	8
Santa Fe	8
Santiago del Estero	12
Tucumán	10
Total	133

=== Vice president ===
Candidate	Party	Votes	%
Marcos Paz	Liberal Party	91	68.42
Manuel Taboada	Unitarian Party	16	12.03
Tadeo Rojo	Independent	6	4.51
Domingo Faustino Sarmiento	Independent	5	3.76
Mariano Fragueiro	Unitarian Party	5	3.76
Dalmacio Vélez Sarsfield	Unitarian Party	3	2.26
Manuel Anselmo Ocampo	Independent	3	2.26
Manuel Urdinarrain	Independent	3	2.26
Valentín Alsina	Liberal Party	1	0.75
Total		133	100.00
Registered voters/turnout		156	–

==== By province ====
Province	Paz	Taboada	Rojo	Sarmiento	Fragueiro	Vélez Sarsfield	Ocampo	Urdinarrain	Alsina
Buenos Aires	15	4		1		1	3		1
Catamarca	Did not vote								
Córdoba	3			4	5				
Corrientes	11								
Entre Ríos	3					2		3	
Jujuy	7								
La Rioja	6								
Mendoza	9								
Salta	9								
San Juan	2		6						
San Luis	8								
Santa Fe	8								
Santiago del Estero		12							
Tucumán	10								
Total	91	16	6	5	5	3	3	3	1
