= 1874 Argentine presidential election =

- 12 April 1874
- Presidential election
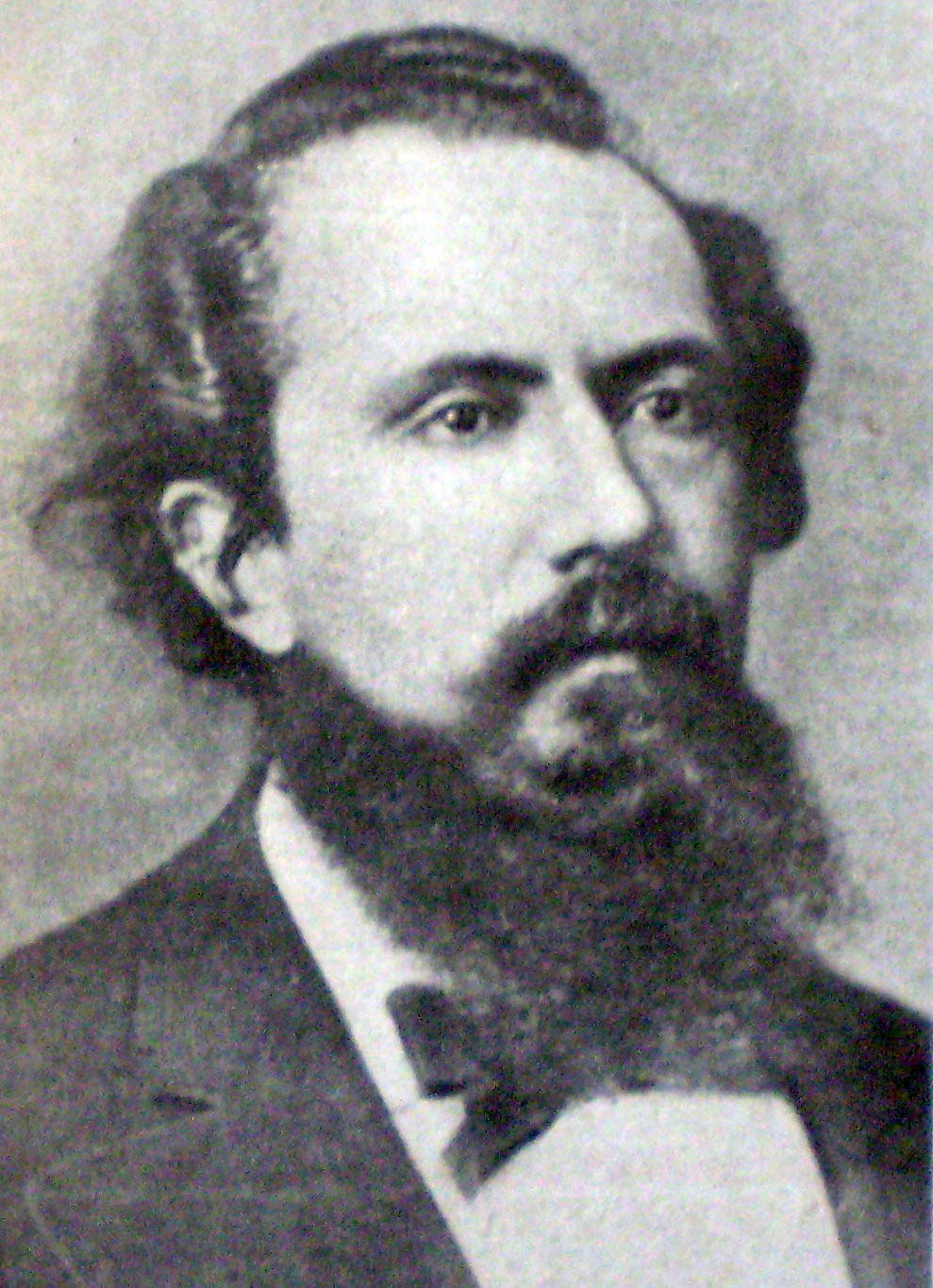

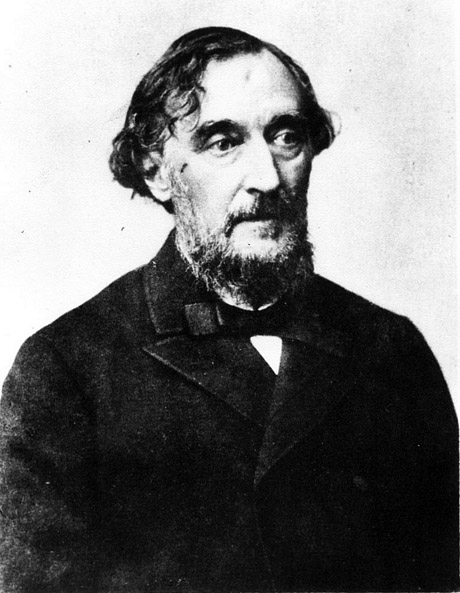
Nominee	Nicolás Avellaneda	Bartolomé Mitre
Party	National	Nationalist
Electoral vote	145	79
Percentage	64.73%	35.27%
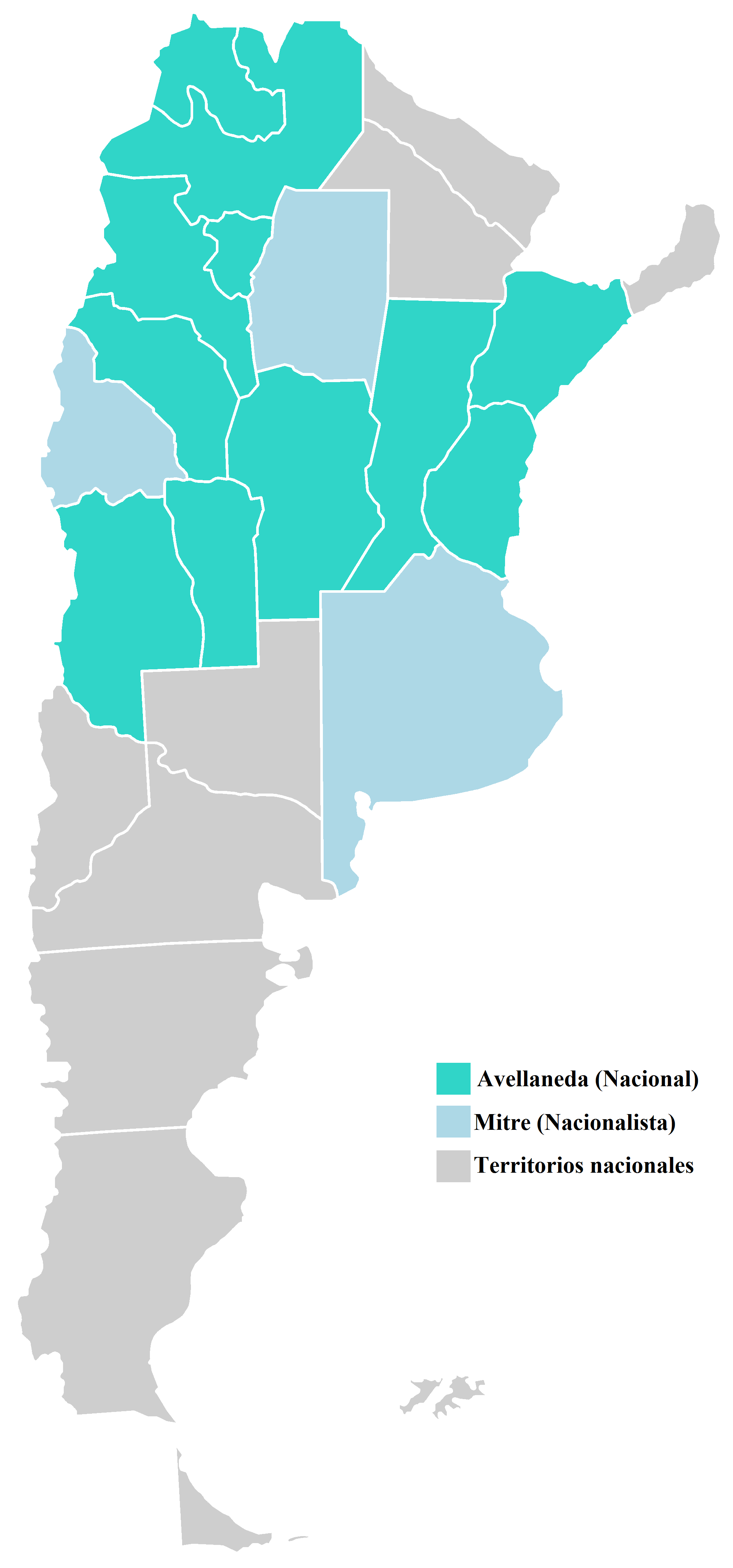
- Results by province
President before election
Domingo Faustino Sarmiento
Independent
Elected President
Nicolás Avellaneda
National

Presidential elections were held in Argentina on 12 April 1874. Nicolás Avellaneda was declared the winner of the elections. Supporters of rival candidate Bartolomé Mitre rebelled.

== Background ==
President Domingo Faustino Sarmiento's pragmatic approach to Buenos Aires' demands and his successful control of separatist revolts in the north paved the way to high office for his vice president, Autonomist Party leader Adolfo Alsina. Alsina gained the support of a sizable faction of Mitre's Nationalist Party, resulting in the formation of the paramount political group in Argentina for the next 42 years: The National Autonomist Party (PAN). Mitre himself did not support Alsina, however, whom he viewed as a veiled Buenos Aires separatist. The elder statesman ran for the presidency again, though the seasoned Alsina outmaneuvered him by fielding Nicolás Avellaneda, a moderate lawyer from remote Tucumán Province. The electoral college met on 12 April 1874, and awarded Mitre only three provinces, including Buenos Aires.

As he had repeatedly up to 1861, Mitre took up arms again. Hoping to prevent Avellaneda's 12 October inaugural, he mutineered a gunboat; he was defeated, however, and only President Avellaneda's commutation spared his life.

== Results ==
=== President ===
Although only 145 electors voted for Avellaneda, in the final count they appear with 146 votes.

Candidate	Party	Votes	%
Nicolás Avellaneda	National Party	145	64.73
Bartolomé Mitre	Nationalist Party	79	35.27
Total		224	100.00
Registered voters/turnout		228	–

==== By province ====
Province	Avellaneda	Mitre
Buenos Aires		53
Catamarca	12	
Córdoba	25	
Corrientes	16	
Entre Ríos	17	
Jujuy	8	
La Rioja	8	
Mendoza	10	
Salta	12	
San Juan		10
San Luis	10	
Santa Fe	12	
Santiago del Estero	1	16
Tucumán	14	
Total	145	79

=== Vice president ===
Although only 145 electors voted for Acosta, in the final count they appear with 146 votes.

Candidate	Party	Votes	%
Mariano Acosta	National Party	145	64.73
Juan Eusebio Torrent	Nationalist Party	79	35.27
Total		224	100.00
Registered voters/turnout		228	–

==== By province ====
Province	Acosta	Torrent
Buenos Aires		53
Catamarca	12	
Córdoba	25	
Corrientes	16	
Entre Ríos	17	
Jujuy	8	
La Rioja	8	
Mendoza	10	
Salta	12	
San Juan		10
San Luis	10	
Santa Fe	12	
Santiago del Estero	1	16
Tucumán	14	
Total	145	79
