= National Civic Union (Argentina) =

Former political party in Argentina

National Civic Union Unión Cívica Nacional
- Leader: Bartolomé Mitre
- Founded: 26 June 1891
- Dissolved: 3 April 1916
- Split from: Civic Union
- Merged into: Radical Civic Union
- Ideology: Liberalism
- Political position: Centre-left

The National Civic Union (Spanish: Unión Cívica Nacional) was a liberal political party in Argentina formed in 1891 as the result of a split in the Civic Union, and dissolved in 1916. It based largely on the personality of its leader, Bartolomé Mitre.

== Origin ==
See Civic Union of the Youth.

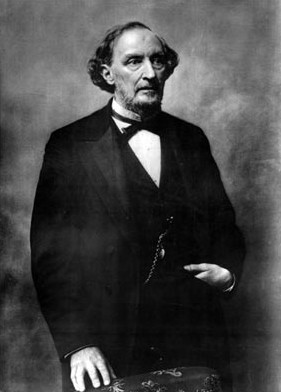
Bartolomé Mitre, founder of the National Civic Union

On April 13, 1890, supporters of the Civic Union of the Youth established the Civic Union in a ceremony at the Buenos Aires Frontón. Leandro N. Alem was elected president and leaders were drawn from all tendencies within the anti-government movement, including Francisco A. Barroetaveña, José Manuel Estrada, Pedro Goyena, Aristóbulo del Valle, Bernardo de Irigoyen, Juan B. Justo, Lisandro de la Torre, and influential ex-president and general Bartolomé Mitre.

The same year, supporters of the Civic Union, led by Leandro Alem and Bartolomé Mitre, instigated the Revolution of the Park, an armed uprising that ousted president Juárez Celman and replaced him with vice president Carlos Pellegrini.

The Civic Union established a presidential ticket with Bartolomé Mitre and Bernardo de Irigoyen. However, Julio Argentino Roca, undisputed leader of the pro-government National Autonomist Party, made a deal with Mitre to form a "national unity" ticket headed by Mitre. After learning of the arrangement on April 16, Leandro Alem opposed it emphatically, splitting the Civic Union and forcing Mitre to abandon his candidacy.

On June 26, Alem's supporters formally founded the Radical Civic Union. In response, Mitre's followers formed the National Civic Union. Members of the latter became known as the Civics, while those of the former became known as the Radicals.

== Political activity ==
Apart from Bartolomé Mitre, politicians associated with the National Civic Union included Guillermo Udaondo and Honorio Pueyrredón.

The Civics and the Radicals proved to be close on most issues, and tended to collaborate. In 1896 the personal link between Mitre and Radical Bernardo de Irigoyen gave rise to the so-called política de las paralelas, whereby the two parties appointed candidates to a common electoral list. In 1897, in opposition to the política de las paralelas, Hipólito Yrigoyen dissolved the Radical Committee of the Province of Buenos Aires.

In 1916, when Radical candidate Yrigoyen won the presidential election, Pueyrredón proposed the dissolution of the National Civic Union. His proposal was accepted, with the majority of the party's members transferring their allegiance to the Radical Civic Union.

=== Electoral history ===
Election	President			Vice President		
Election	Candidate	Electoral vote	Size	Candidate	Electoral vote	Size
1892	Bartolomé Mitre	5 / 232	2nd	—		
1898	Bartolomé Mitre	38 / 300	2nd	Juan Eusebio Torrent	23 / 300	2nd
1898	—			Bartolomé Mitre	1 / 300	5th
1904	—			Guillermo Udaondo	12 / 300	2nd

== Works cited ==
- Luna, Felix (1994). Soy Roca. Buenos Aires: Sudamericana. ISBN 987-566-076-0.
- Luna, Felix (1964). Yrigoyen. Buenos Aires: Desarrollo.

== See also ==
- Bartolomé Mitre
- Civic Union
- Radical Civic Union
