= 1892 Argentine presidential election =

- 10 April 1892
- Presidential election
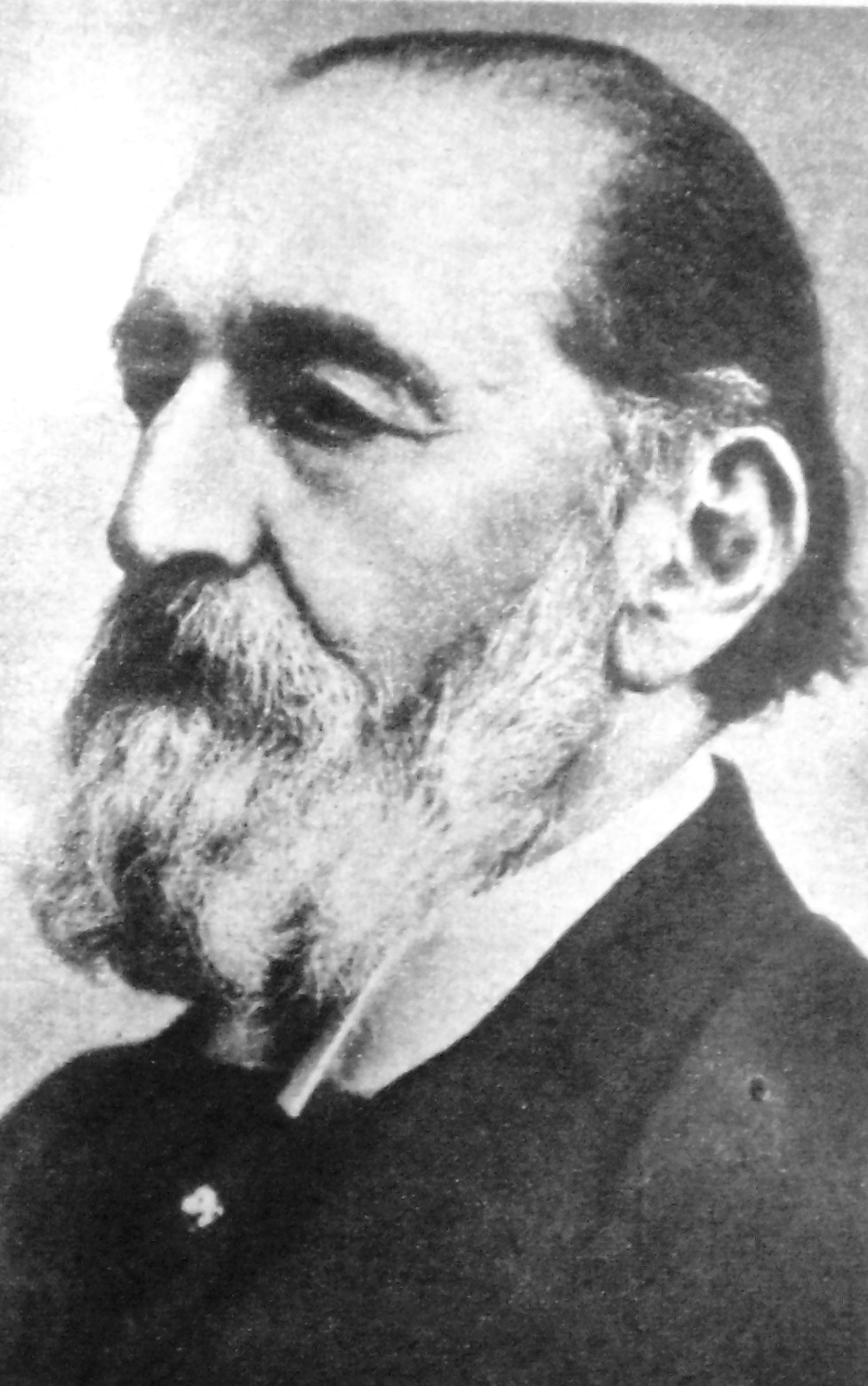

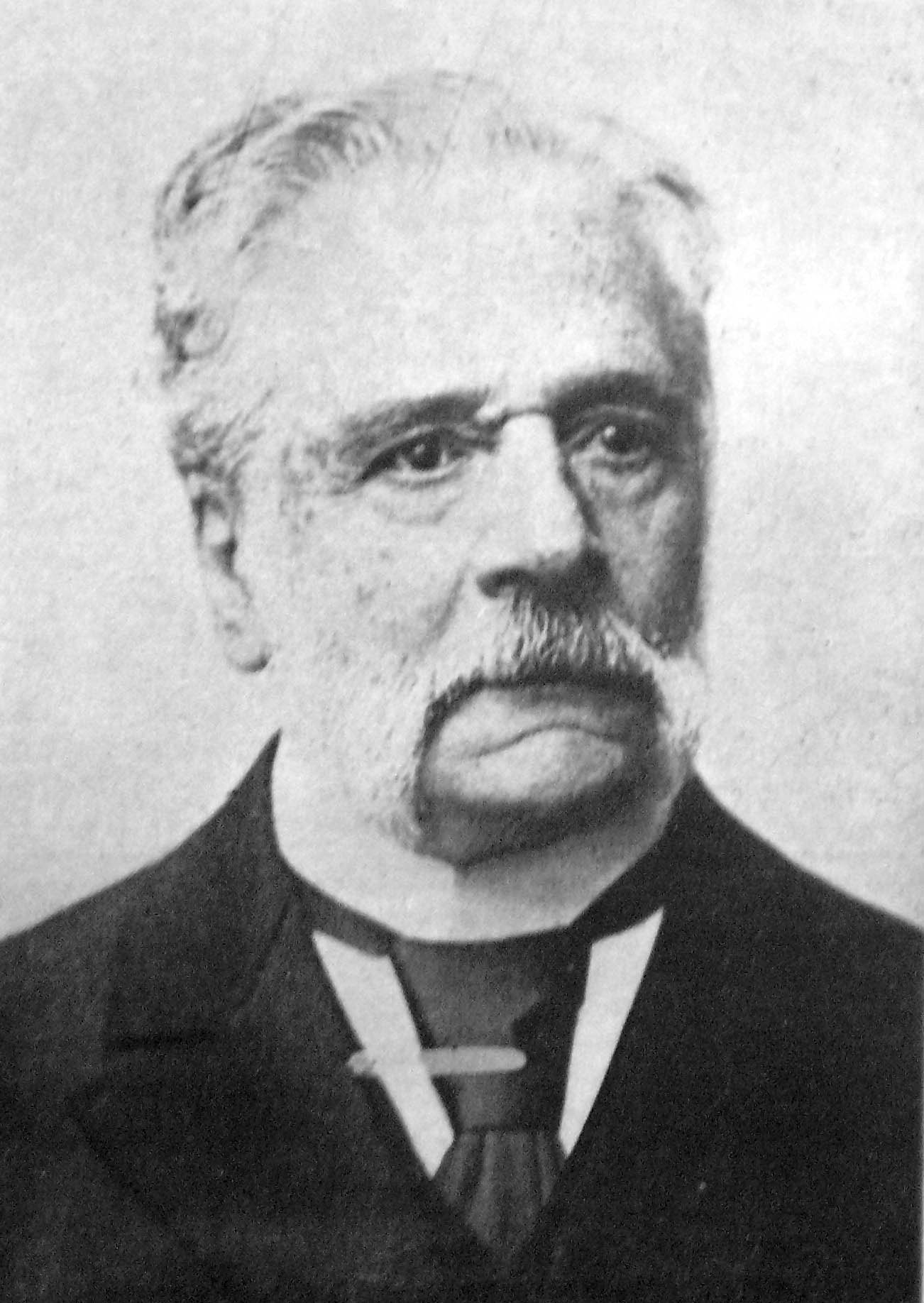

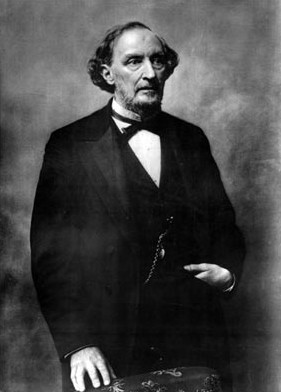
Nominee	Luis Sáenz Peña	Bernardo de Irigoyen	Bartolomé Mitre
Party	PAN	UCR	UCN
Electoral vote	210	5	5
Percentage	95.02%	2.26%	2.26%
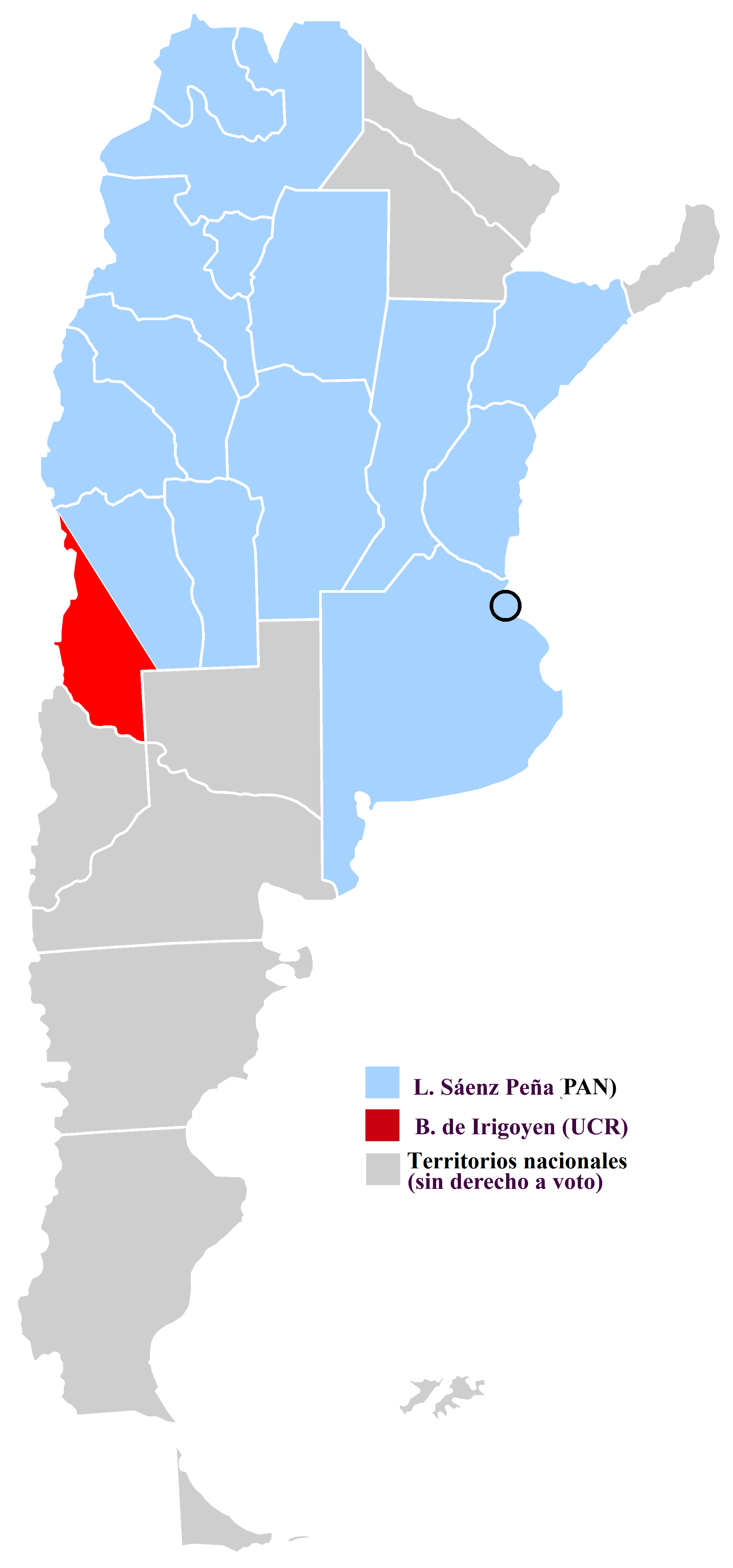
- Results by province
President before election
Carlos Pellegrini
PAN
Elected President
Luis Sáenz Peña
PAN

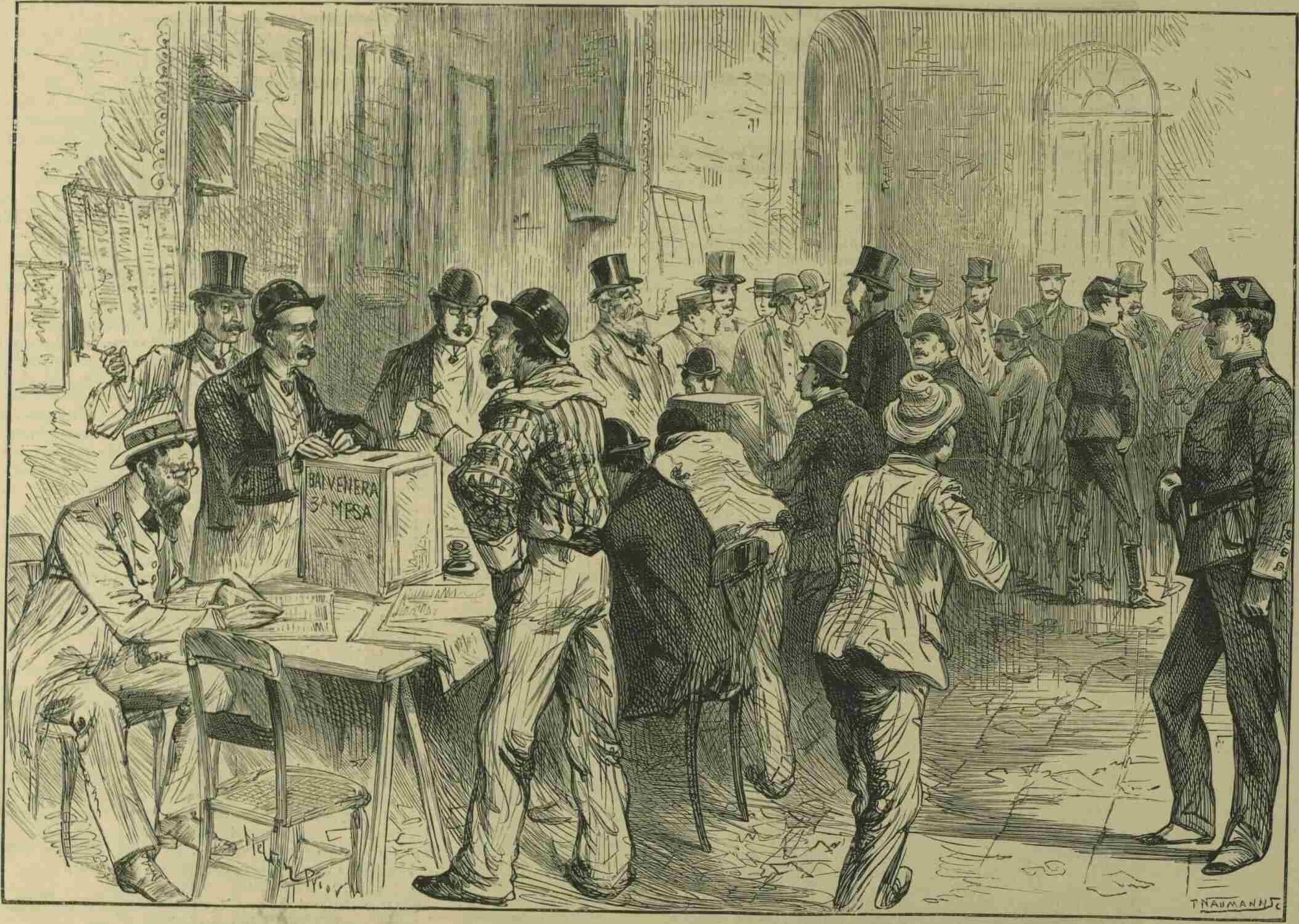
Voting under military protection in Buenos Aires

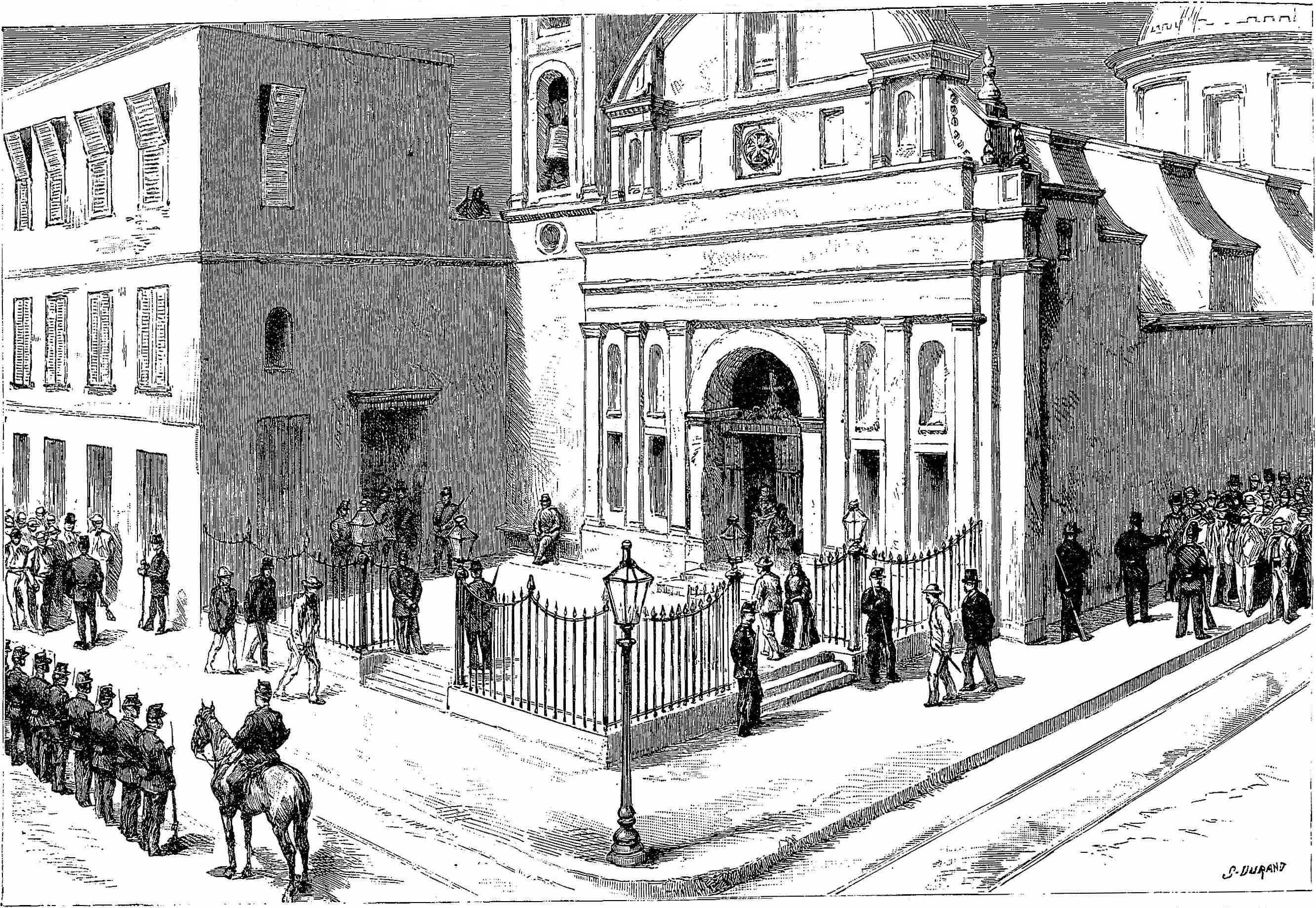
Polling station at the Church of La Merced in Buenos Aires

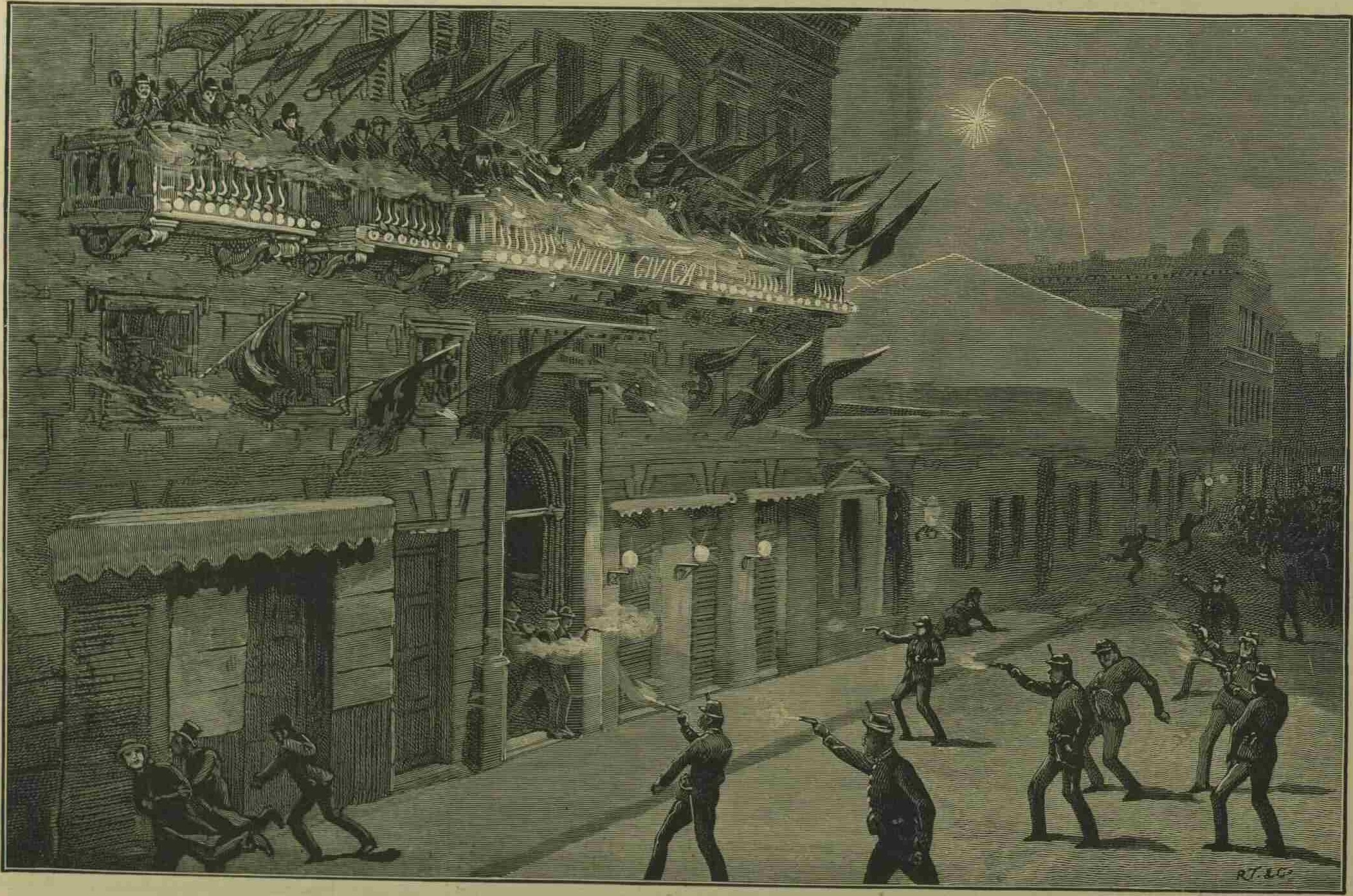
Meeting at the Civic Union Club in conflict with the police

Presidential elections were held in Argentina on 10 April 1892. Luis Sáenz Peña was elected president.

== Background ==
An 1888 massacre of a May Day gathering and an unprecedented financial crisis led to the formation of the first meaningful opposition to develop as reform movements in urban areas, culminating in the Revolution of the Park that forced Juárez Celman's 1890 resignation. These developments gathered speed when the Civic Union of the Youth became the Radical Civic Union (UCR), in 1891. Instability also prompted moderates from within the PAN to advance a diplomat, Roque Sáenz Peña, as the nominee. Roca foiled this move by persuading former Supreme Court Chief Justice Luis Sáenz Peña (Roque's father) to run – forcing the young reformist to withdraw. The UCR's appeal, for its part, helped lead President Carlos Pellegrini (who replaced the besieged Juárez Celman) to declare a state of siege a week before the 10 April 1892 elections. The resulting UCR electoral boycott left the ruling PAN as the only party on the ballot, handing its nominee the presidency unanimously.

== Results ==
=== President ===
Candidate	Party	Votes	%
Luis Sáenz Peña	National Autonomist Party	210	95.02
Bernardo de Irigoyen	Radical Civic Union	5	2.26
Bartolomé Mitre	National Civic Union	5	2.26
Julio Argentino Roca	National Autonomist Party	1	0.45
Total		221	100.00
Registered voters/turnout		232	–

==== By province ====
Province	Sáenz Peña	Irigoyen	Mitre	Roca
Buenos Aires City	20			1
Buenos Aires	33			
Catamarca	12			
Córdoba	26			
Corrientes	13			
Entre Ríos	17			
Jujuy	8			
La Rioja	8			
Mendoza	5	5		
Salta	11			
San Juan	10			
San Luis	10			
Santa Fe	11			
Santiago del Estero	17			
Tucumán	9		5	
Total	210	5	5	1

=== Vice president ===
Candidate	Party	Votes	%
José Evaristo Uriburu	National Autonomist Party	216	97.74
Juan M. Garro	Radical Civic Union	5	2.26
Total		221	100.00
Registered voters/turnout		232	–

==== By province ====
Province	Uriburu	Garro
Buenos Aires City	21	
Buenos Aires	33	
Catamarca	12	
Córdoba	26	
Corrientes	13	
Entre Ríos	17	
Jujuy	8	
La Rioja	8	
Mendoza	5	5
Salta	11	
San Juan	10	
San Luis	10	
Santa Fe	11	
Santiago del Estero	17	
Tucumán	14	
Total	216	5
