= 1898 Argentine general election =

- Presidential election
- 10 April 1898

300 members of the Electoral College 151 votes needed to win
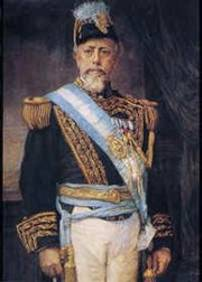

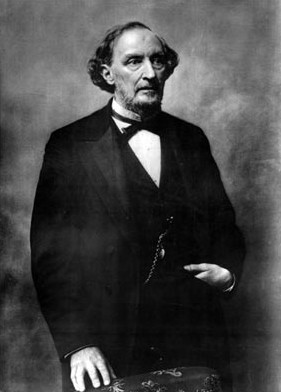
Nominee	Julio Argentino Roca	Bartolomé Mitre
Party	PAN	UCN
Electoral vote	218	38
Percentage	85.16%	14.84%
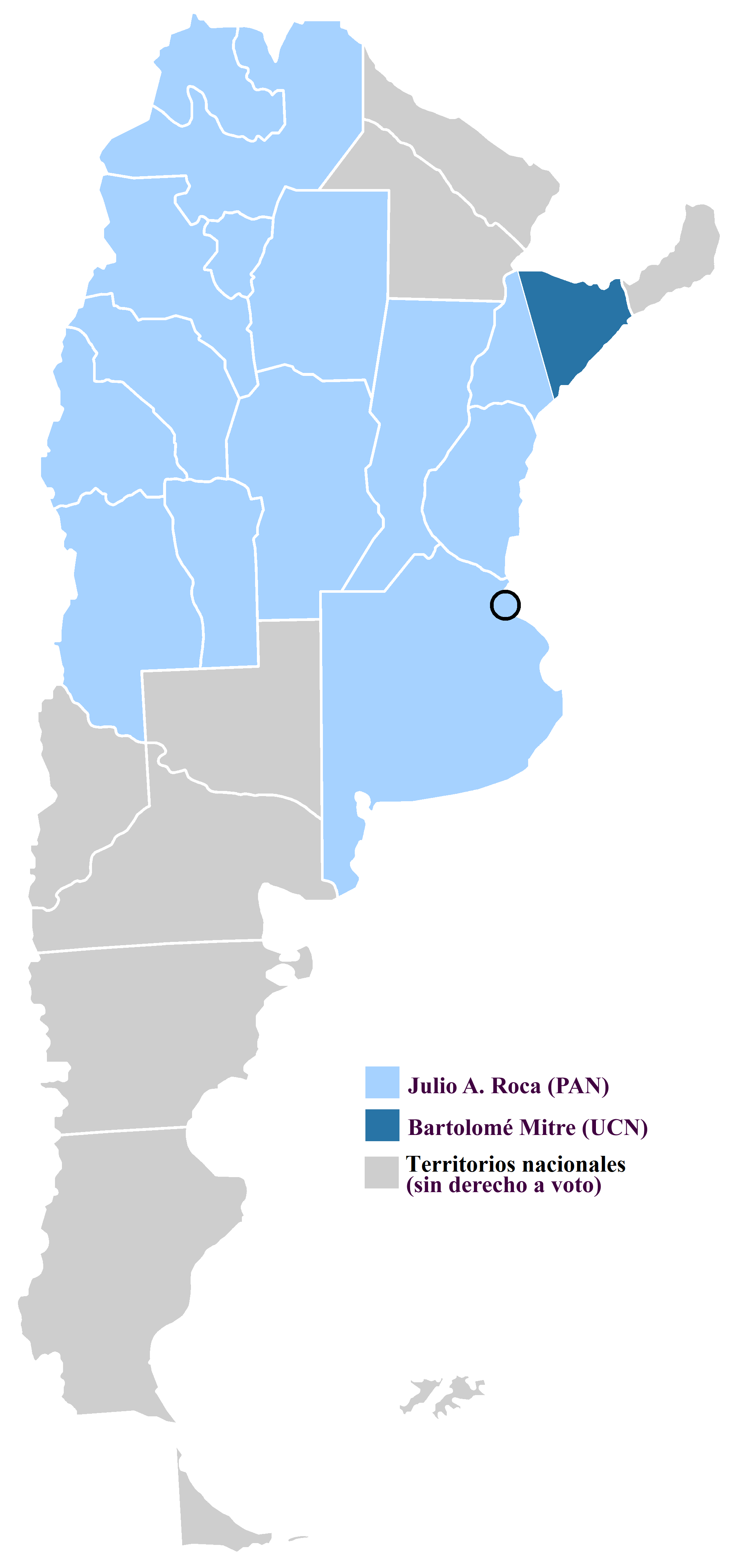
- Results by province
President before election
José Evaristo Uriburu
National Autonomist Party
Elected President
Julio Argentino Roca
National Autonomist Party
- Legislative election
- 10 April 1898
- 79 of 120 seats in the Chamber of Deputies
Party	Seats
PAN and allies	79
This lists parties that won seats. See the complete results below.

General elections were held in Argentina on 10 April 1898 to choose the president and 79 of 120 seats in the Chamber of Deputies. Julio Argentino Roca was elected president for a second period.

== Background ==
Having obtained the aging Luis Sáenz Peña's resignation in favor of Vice President José Evaristo Uriburu (who was good stead with both Roca and Mitre), Roca once again carried the PAN standard in 1898. The UCR, which had lost its founder, Leandro Alem, to suicide in 1896, was divided between those who backed Senator Bernardo de Irigoyen's drive to form coalitions with more conservative parties, and those who supported the party's new leader, Hipólito Yrigoyen (who boycotted this and future "election songs" – establishing what later became known as the UCR's "break before bending" policy). Public debate was heated on the eve of the January 30 elections to a constitutional assembly entrusted to increase the number of congressmen and cabinet members, as well before the April 10, 1898, general election. The electoral college yielded no surprises, though, and Roca was returned to the presidency.

== Results ==
=== President ===
Candidate	Party	Votes	%
Julio Argentino Roca	National Autonomist Party	218	85.16
Bartolomé Mitre	National Civic Union	38	14.84
Total		256	100.00
Registered voters/turnout		300	–

==== By province ====
Province	Roca	Mitre
Buenos Aires City	22	13
Buenos Aires	23	18
Catamarca	10	
Córdoba	24	
Corrientes	7	7
Entre Ríos	20	
Jujuy	8	
La Rioja	8	
Mendoza	11	
Salta	9	
San Juan	8	
San Luis	9	
Santa Fe	28	
Santiago del Estero	14	
Tucumán	17	
Total	218	38

=== Vice president ===
Candidate	Party	Votes	%
Norberto Quirno Costa	National Autonomist Party	217	84.77
Juan Eusebio Torrent	National Civic Union	23	8.98
Valentín Virasoro	Liberal Party of Corrientes	7	2.73
Julio Argentino Roca	National Autonomist Party	6	2.34
Lino D. Churruarín	Radical Civic Union	1	0.39
Emilio Gouchón	Radical Civic Union	1	0.39
Bartolomé Mitre	National Civic Union	1	0.39
Total		256	100.00
Registered voters/turnout		300	–

==== By province ====
Province	Quirno Costa	Torrent	Virasoro	Roca	Churruarín	Gouchón	Mitre
Buenos Aires City	22	10		1		1	1
Buenos Aires	23	13		5 (Note: In the vote table these 5 votes appear incorrectly as 5 votes from Córdoba.)			
Catamarca	10						
Córdoba	24						
Corrientes	7		7				
Entre Ríos	19				1		
Jujuy	8						
La Rioja	8						
Mendoza	11						
Salta	9						
San Juan	8						
San Luis	9						
Santa Fe	28						
Santiago del Estero	14						
Tucumán	17						
Total	217	23	7	6	1	1	1

=== Chamber of Deputies ===
The National Autonomist Party and its allies won all 79 seats in the election.
