= Civic Union (Argentina) =

Civic Union Unión Cívica
- Leader: Leandro N. Alem
- Founded: 1890
- Dissolved: 1891
- Preceded by: Civic Union of the Youth
- Succeeded by: Radical Civic Union; National Civic Union
- Headquarters: Buenos Aires
- Ideology: Universal suffrage

Party flag

The Civic Union (Spanish: Unión Cívica) was a short-lived political party in Argentina, founded on April 13, 1890 out of the Civic Union of the Youth. That same year it led the Revolution of the Park that forced President Miguel Juárez Celman's resignation, but shortly after dissolved itself in two branches, the Radical Civic Union and the National Civic Union, each following one of the Civic Union's foremost leaders, Leandro Alem and Bartolomé Mitre, respectively.

Since 1880, the exercise of power was concentrated in an elite that controlled access to candidacies. For this reason, the Civic Union emerged, which proposed to regenerate political life by promoting citizen participation in public space and demanding respect for the constitution and political freedoms.

== History ==
On April 13, 1890, supporters of the Civic Union of the Youth established the Civic Union in a ceremony at the Buenos Aires Frontón. Leandro N. Alem was elected president and leaders were drawn from all tendencies within the anti-government movement, including Francisco A. Barroetaveña, José Manuel Estrada, Pedro Goyena, Aristóbulo del Valle, Bernardo de Irigoyen, Juan B. Justo, Lisandro de la Torre, and influential ex-president and general Bartolomé Mitre.

The same year, supporters of the Civic Union, led by Leandro Alem and Bartolomé Mitre, instigated the Revolution of the Park, an armed uprising that ousted president Juárez Celman and replaced him with vice president Carlos Pellegrini.

The Civic Union established a presidential ticket with Bartolomé Mitre and Bernardo de Irigoyen. However, Julio Argentino Roca, undisputed leader of the pro-government National Autonomist Party, made a deal with Mitre to form a "national unity" ticket headed by Mitre. After learning of the arrangement on April 16, Leandro Alem opposed it emphatically, splitting the Civic Union and forcing Mitre to abandon his candidacy.

On June 26, 1891, Alem's supporters formally founded the Radical Civic Union. In response, Mitre's followers formed the National Civic Union. Members of the latter became known as the Civics, while those of the former became known as the Radicals.

== See also ==
- Leandro Alem
- Bartolomé Mitre
- National Civic Union
- Radical Civic Union
