= Civic Union of the Youth =

Argentine political party

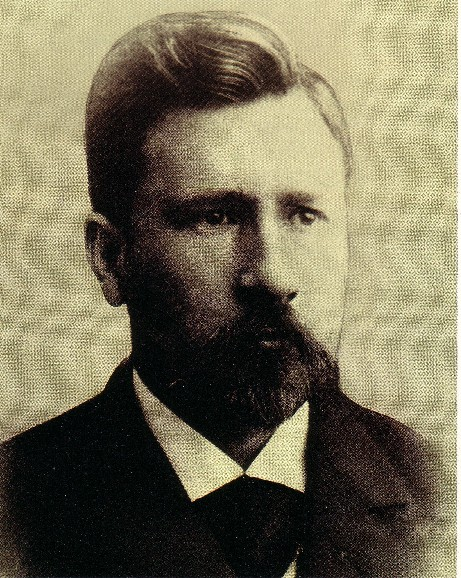
Francisco Barroetaveña, President of the Civic Union of the Youth

The Civic Union of the Youth (in Spanish, Unión Cívica de la Juventud) was a youth-oriented Argentine political party founded on September 1, 1889, and dissolved on April 13, 1890, with the establishment of the Civic Union. Soon afterward its leaders created the most important Argentine political parties of the early 20th Century: the Radical Civic Union, the National Civic Union, the Socialist Party, and the Democratic Progressive Party.

== The national climate ==
In 1889, Argentina was in the second year of a severe economic crisis that had caused a sharp drop in wages, increased unemployment, and an unprecedented number of strikes. President Julio Argentino Roca was succeeded by his brother-in-law, Miguel Juárez Celman, whose administration was characterized by authoritarian tactics and denunciations of corruption. Among its opponents Celman's government was nicknamed el Unicato, "the Autocracy".

== Precursors ==
In his introduction to Unión Cívica, su origen, organización y tendencias, published in 1890, Dr. Francisco Ramos Mejía described the genesis of the organization:

When did it begin? It would be difficult, if not impossible, to answer that, because there first arose a vague hope, which later grew along with the sentiment of disgust, and while Tomás Santa Coloma was preparing the ground with his patriotic solemnities at the Club de Gimnasia y Esgrima, and Barroetaveña was raising the alarm with his courageous articles, the faithful were rallying opinion and building to an explosion. ¡Unión Cívica!

On August 20, 1889, Francisco Barroetaveña, a young lawyer from Entre Ríos, published an article in La Nación titled "Tu quoque juventud (en tropel al éxito)" — "You too, youth (in the rush to success)" — in which he challenged the youth who remained loyal to President Celman:

This affiliation is nothing more than the renunciation of civic life by the young, in favor of absorption into a superior will that converts them into the mere instruments of the Executive

The article produced a massive response. Diverse groups of youths and students, united only by their discontent towards Celman's government, looked to Berroetaveña for leadership. They soon organized themselves into a small interest group which met regularly. Apart from Berroetaveña himself, this group included Modesto Sánchez Viamonte, Carlos Zuberbüler, Carlos Videla, Emilio Gouchon, future president Marcelo T. de Alvear, Juan B. Justo, Manuel A. Montes de Oca, Tomás le Breton, and many others.

At one of their assemblies they resolved to convoke a great meeting "to awaken the national civic life".

== Foundation ==
On September 1, the great meeting was realized in Buenos Aires's Jardín Florida, attracting an audience of more than three thousand and the presence of the main opposition politicians. The Unión Cívica de la Juventud was founded, and its platform approved: it would seek to broaden the spectrum of opposition to the regime of Miguel Juárez Celman and his supporters in the National Autonomist Party. The meeting ended with a march to the Plaza de Mayo.

The party was directed by those who seemed the natural leaders of the youth: Barroetaveña, accompanied by Emilio Gouchón, Juan B. Justo, Martín Torino, Marcelo T. de Alvear, Tomás Le Breton, and Manuel A. Montes de Oca, among others.

The Civic Union of the Youth established "honorary" affiliations to certain opposition politicians deemed friendly to their cause, including Leandro Alem, Aristóbulo del Valle, Bartolomé Mitre, Pedro Goyena, Vicente Fidel López, and Bernardo de Irigoyen.

Inspired by the Partido Republicano founded by Leandro Alem and Valle in 1877, members of the Civic Union of the Youth organized themselves into local "civic clubs".

== Transformation into the Civic Union ==
On April 13, 1890, in a large meeting at the Buenos Aires Frontón, the Civic Union of the Youth dissolved itself and a new party, the Civic Union, was formed.

Leandro Alem was elected president, and leaders were drawn from all tendencies within the opposition to the administration of Celman, including Barroetaveña, the Catholic politicians José Manuel Estrada and Pedro Goyena, Aristóbulo del Valle, Bernardo de Irigoyen, Juan B. Justo, Lisandro de la Torre, and the influential former president and general Bartolomé Mitre.

The Civic Union came into its own after the bloody Revolution of the Park, despite the fact that it had failed to bring about the fall of president Miguel Juárez Celman and his successor, his former vice president Carlos Pellegrini.

== See also ==
- Radical Civic Union
- National Civic Union
- Revolution of the Park
- Leandro Alem
