= Eliseo Canaveri =

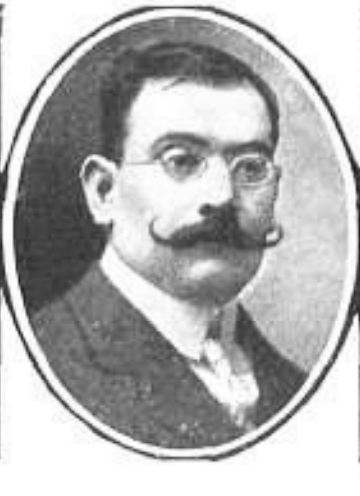

President of the Bolsa de Cereales de Buenos Aires
- In office 1908–1917
- Preceded by: Carlos P. Rodríguez
- Succeeded by: José Etcheverry

Secretary of the Bolsa de Cereales de Buenos Aires
- In office ?–?
- Preceded by: ?
- Succeeded by: ?

Personal details
- Born: Eliseo Félix Canaveri Roygt; May 17, 1859 Buenos Aires
- Died: 1919 (aged 59–60) Buenos Aires
- Resting place: La Recoleta Cemetery
- Party: Radical Civic Union
- Spouse: Margarita Rossenthal Dorrego
- Occupation: broker treasurer politician

Eliseo Félix Canaveri Roygt (1859–1919) was an Argentine stockbroker and politician, who served as secretary and president of the Bolsa de Cereales de Buenos Aires. He was a delegate of the Argentine National Commission during the Panama–Pacific International Exposition of 1915.

He was born on May 17, 1859, in Buenos Aires, the son of José Canaveri and Hipolita Roygt Suárez, belonging to a family of Genoese and Catalan roots. He did his elementary and university studies in Buenos Aires, beginning his career as a "Corredor de Frutos" (fruit wholesale distributor) in the mid-1880s.

He was married to Margarita Rosenthal, daughter of Herman Rosenthal, born in Holstein, and Ángela Dorrego, a noble lady daughter in turn of Manuel Dorrego and Ángela Francisca Baudrix, a family linked to the main political events that took place in Argentina during the 1820s.

He served on the Buenos Aires Cereal Exchange, first as secretary and then president from 1908 to 1917. He had an intense political activity, he militated in the Unión Civica Radical taking part in the Revolution of the Park. He ran as a candidate for the post of senator and deputy in the elections of 1913 and 1914.
