= Miguel Ángel Juárez =

5th President of Argentina

Miguel Juárez Celman
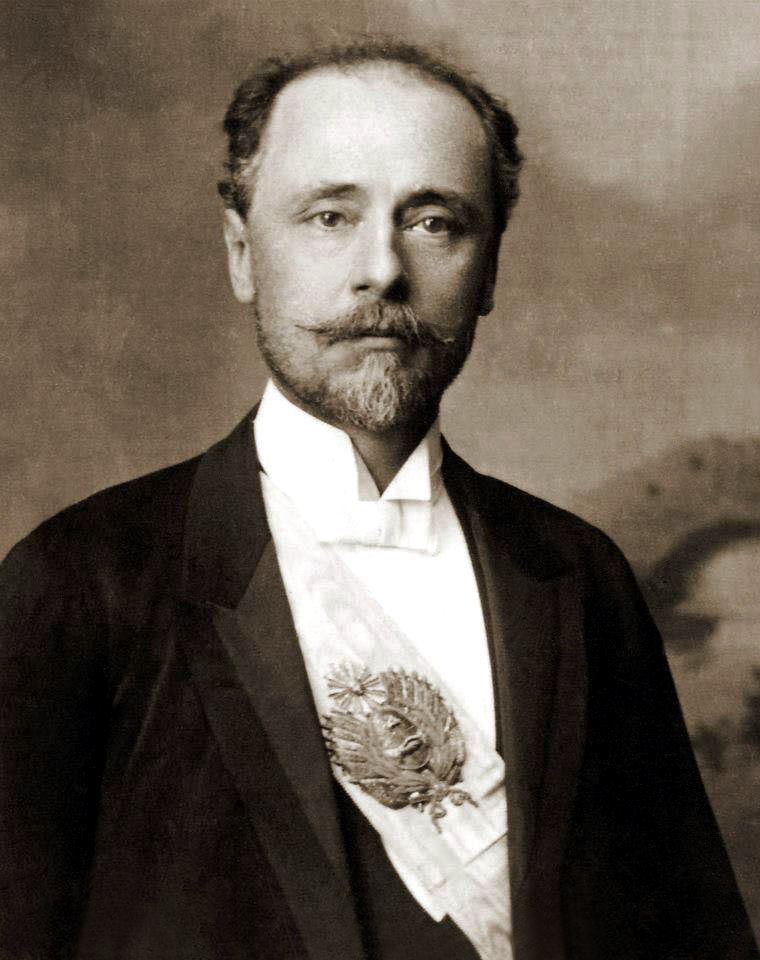

10th President of Argentina
- In office October 12, 1886 – August 6, 1890
- Vice President: Carlos Pellegrini
- Preceded by: Julio A. Roca
- Succeeded by: Carlos Pellegrini

Governor of Córdoba
- In office May 17, 1880 – May 17, 1883
- Preceded by: Antonio del Viso
- Succeeded by: Gregorio Gavier

Personal details
- Born: Miguel Ángel Juárez Celman; September 29, 1844 Córdoba, Argentina
- Died: April 14, 1909 (aged 64) Arrecifes, Argentina
- Resting place: La Recoleta Cemetery; Buenos Aires, Argentina
- Party: National Autonomist Party
- Spouse: Benedicta Elisa Funes
- Children: 9
- Education: National University of Córdoba
- Profession: Lawyer
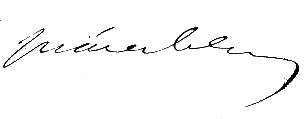
- Signature

Miguel Ángel Juárez Celman (September 29, 1844 – April 14, 1909) was the President of Argentina from 1886 until his resignation in 1890.

His career was defined by the influence of his kinsman, Julio Argentino Roca, who propelled him into a legislative career. He was a staunch promoter of separation of church and state and an aristocratic liberal.

As president of Argentina, he promoted public works but was not capable of maintaining economic stability and had to contend with the powerful opposition of the Civic Union Party, and its leader Leandro N. Alem. After the Revolución del Parque, although he defeated the uprising, he was forced to resign and retired from political life.

== Biography ==
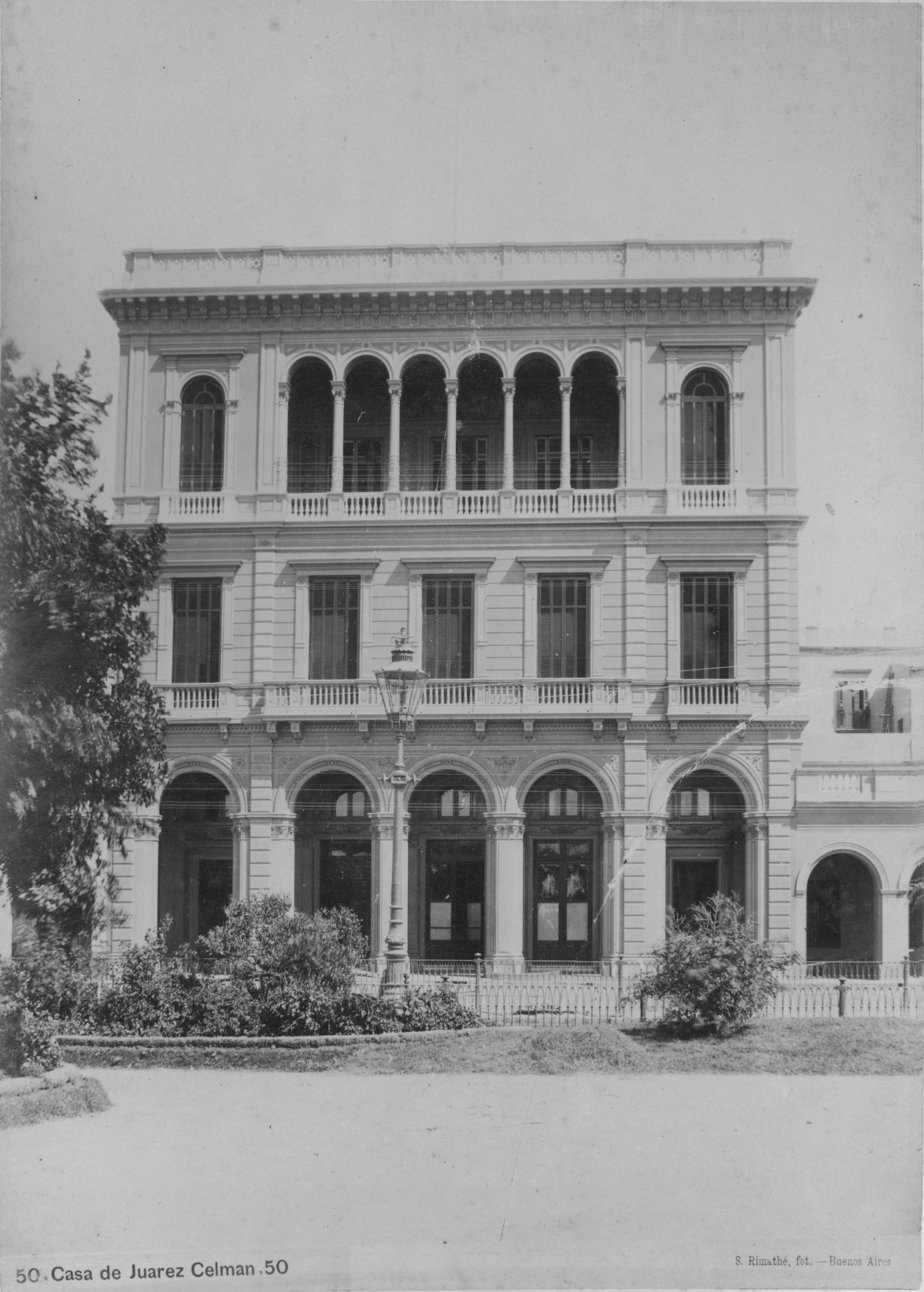
Juarez Celman's house.

Miguel Ángel Juárez Celman was born on September 29, 1844, in the city of Córdoba, Argentina.

Son of José Marcos Juárez and Rosario Celman, he belonged to an aristocratic family and entered political activity early. He studied under the Jesuits at the Colegio de Montserrat. He studied Law, becoming a lawyer in 1869. In 1867, he became an active Freemason.

In 1872 he married Benedicta Elisa Funes, Clara Funes' younger sister (the latter would be the wife of the Argentine president, Julio Argentino Roca).

On March 24, 1874, he obtained his doctorate. He was elected deputy when he just graduated from his doctorate, and from the provincial parliament he led the movement for the secularization of educational institutions. Two years later he was elected to the Senate, and in 1877 appointed president of the body. Only briefly exercised the function, because the death of Governor Clímaco de la Peña led to the government Antonio del Viso, who appointed him Minister of Government. He would hold the position until the end of del Viso's term.

His energetic and informed performance earned him the nomination for governor that same year, and he was elected by the National Autonomist Party, taking office on May 17, 1880.

=== Governor ===
He was Governor-elect when there was an insurrection in Buenos Aires, led by Carlos Tejedor and Lisandro Olmos, opposed to the federalization of Buenos Aires. The federalization succeeded in 1880 and was followed by the establishment of state elementary education in the capital during the presidency of Julio A. Roca, together with this and the other members of the League of Governors, he founded the National Autonomist Party (PAN) in the following years.

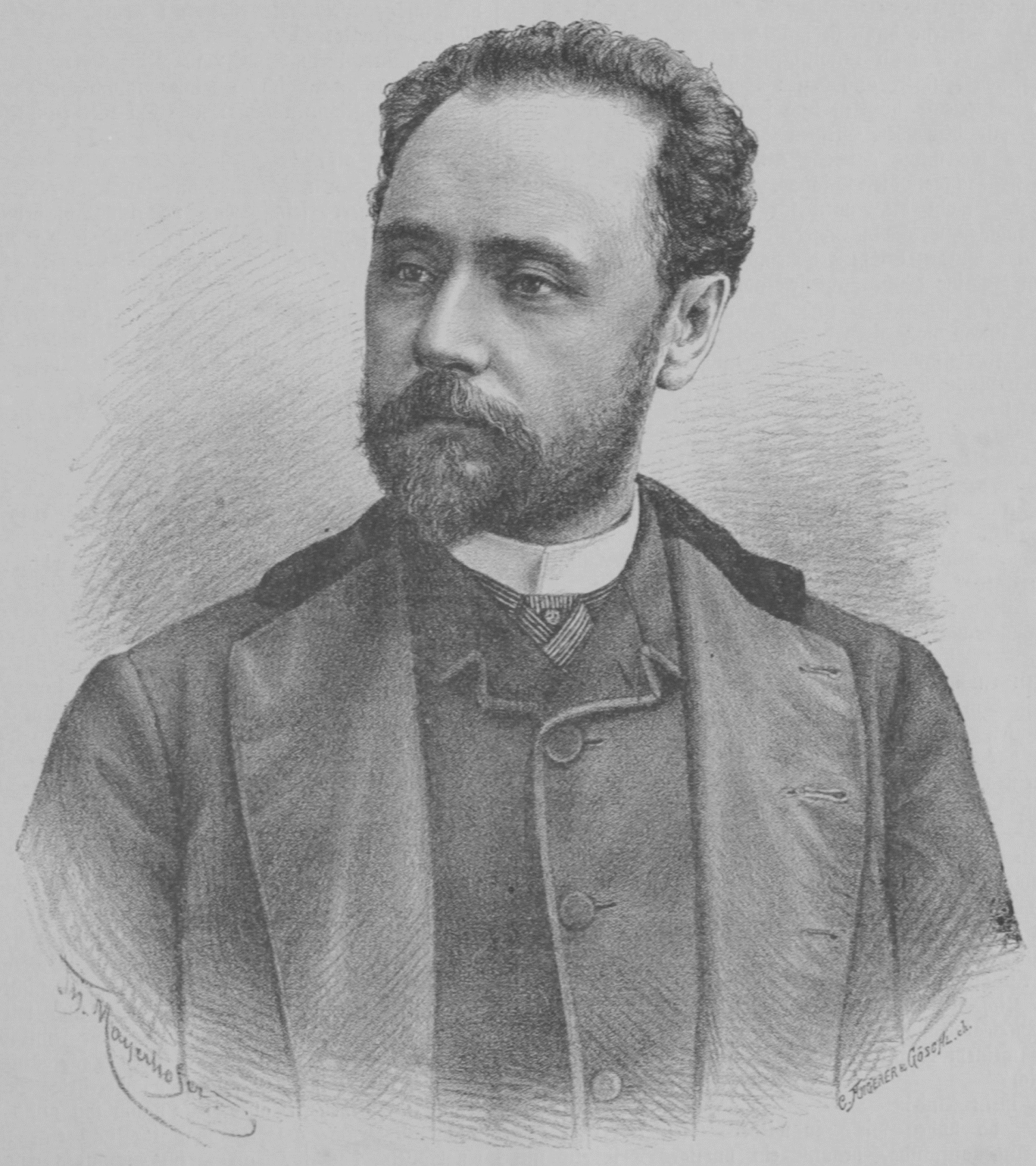
Juarez Celman in 1885.

National autonomism endorsed a Comtian conception of industrial and civil progress, which perfectly matched the then-famous anti-clericalism of Juárez Celman. His government works in Córdoba included the establishment of the Civil Registry, the regulation of burials and urban layout, the creation of schools and hospitals, and the creation of agricultural colonies in the interior of the province.

His temperament and style of government stood out alongside his achievements. The mistrust of popular initiatives and the private management of politics were made manifest in the governor's constant direct interventions, his interference in the distribution of credit and the recourse to the presence of the army in case of encountering obstacles.

=== The constitutional reform of 1883: municipalities ===
The municipal regime established in the Provincial Constitution of Córdoba of 1855 did not abandon the municipal structure in force in colonial times. For each department there was a municipal administration that, in this way, included in its jurisdiction more than one populated center. Years later, in 1870, reforms were introduced to the Constitution, expanding the powers of the municipalities but without modifying the archaic structures in force. Through the same constitutional reform, the executive powers of the Cordovan municipalities ceased to be collegiate bodies and were replaced by the post of mayor: administrative, one-person, elective function, whose mandate was set for three years. Also for the mandate of the councilors, then called municipal, a period of three years was established.

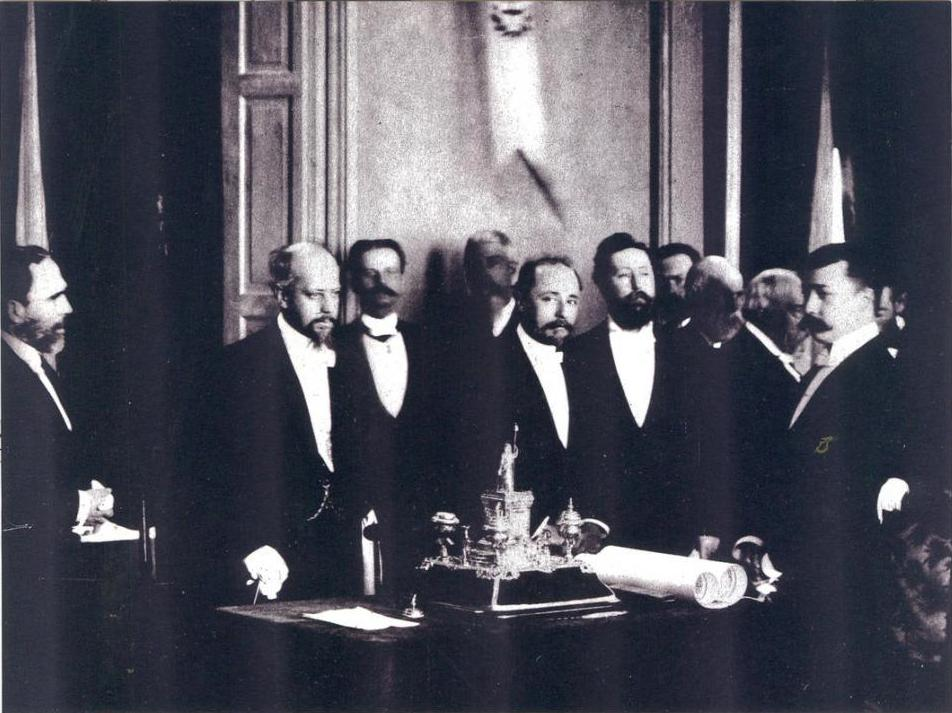
Personalities members of the "Generación del '80".

=== The succession of Roca ===
From his position as Governor of Córdoba, and motivated by his proximity to Roca, Juárez Celman envisioned the possibility of being the presidential candidate of the National Autonomist Party in 1886, informing himself through the deputies and senators in Córdoba about political events, and exchanging private correspondence with the president.

There were serious doubts about a candidacy of Juárez: his youth, since when he left the position of governor he was 39 years old; the political displacement of his trusted man, former Governor Antonio del Viso, replaced in the Ministry of the Interior by Bernardo de Irigoyen in February 1882; and Roca's decision to prevent a political ally of the Cordovan governor, Luis G. Pinto, from reaching the governorship of Santiago del Estero.

Without major expectations, on May 17, 1883, Juárez Celman handed over the provincial command to his successor Gregorio Gavier, also an autonomist, and the Legislative Assembly quickly appointed him a senator in accordance with Article 46 of the 1853 Constitution. On July 31, he joined to the Chamber of Senators of the Argentine Nation, where he continued to adopt anticlerical positions, already exhibited during his time as governor. From there, in defense of debatable electoral procedures, he would come to think that "consulting the people is always making mistakes, since they only have murky opinions."

=== Presidential election 1886 ===
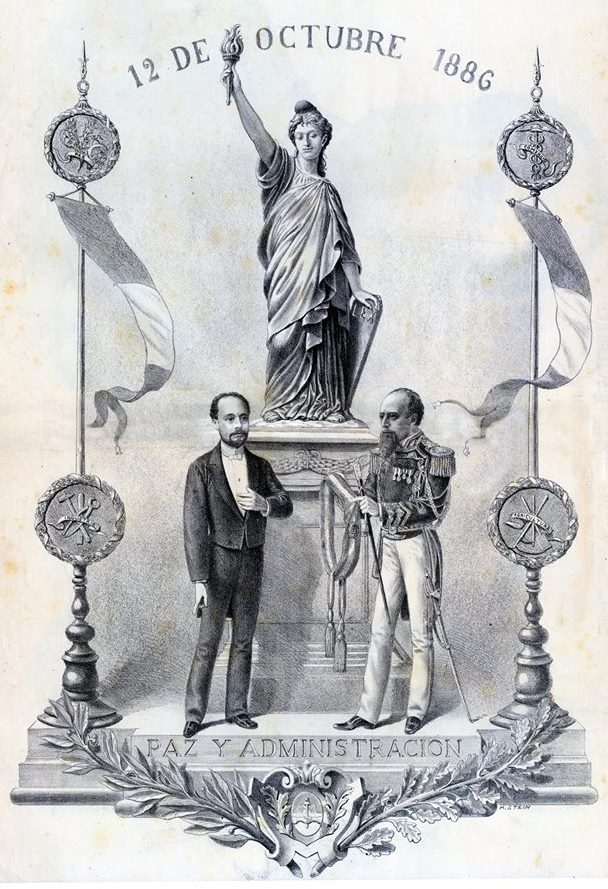
Caricature of the presidential elections of 1886.

Julio A. Roca, who was not interested in the ideas of others but only in his own, driven by the desire to return to occupy the chair of Rivadavia and believed in the friendship and proven loyalty of Juárez, his brother-in-law, favored the candidacy from Córdoba for the presidential succession. Juárez Celman stood in the presidential elections of April 11, 1886, in which he won, not without accusations of electoral fraud (an otherwise frequent practice by the PAN). Carlos Pellegrini, former Minister of War of Roca, accompanied him in the formula.

== Presidency (1886–1890) ==
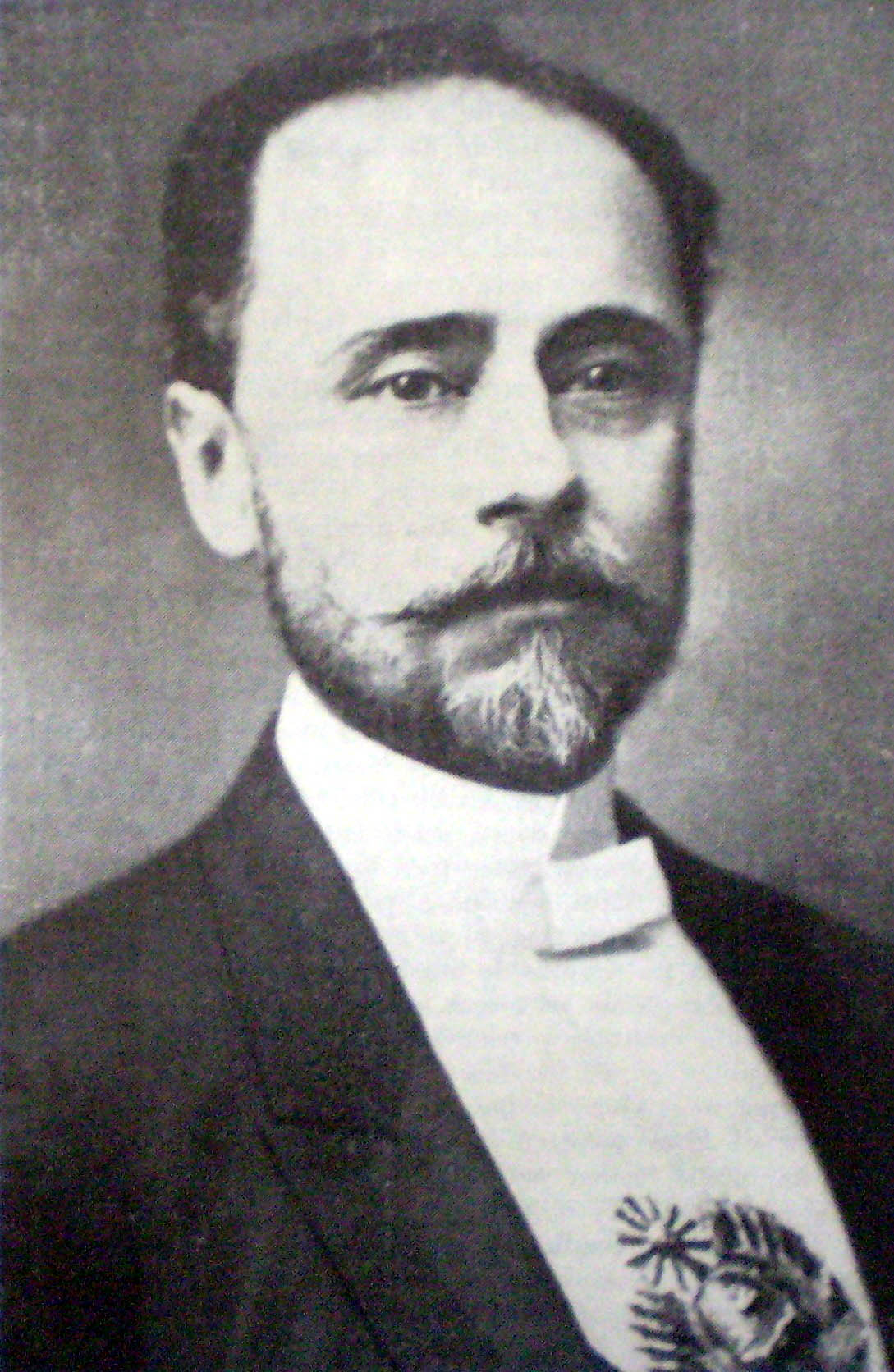
Juarez Celman with the Presidential sash.

On October 12 he assumed the presidency; In his inaugural speech he announced his liberal ideology, which included the promotion of education, European immigration - with which he intended to reverse the "inferiority" of native blood - and private enterprise. His emphasis on the role of individuals, however, contrasted sharply with his style of government; Accustomed to the autocratic direction of public affairs, he quickly came into conflict with Roca, who aspired to maintain his influence over the government and the National Autonomist Party.

=== Governance management ===
Juárez Celman promoted public works, especially in Buenos Aires, with the intention of resembling it to the European capitals that he took as a reference. He ordered the construction of government buildings such as the Correo Central (only completed in 1928), the Colón Theater, numerous schools and sanitary infrastructure, the reform of the port of Buenos Aires according to Eduardo Madero's project, and the beginning of the works of the San Roque Dam, by Bialet Massé.

On April 10, 1888, the president created a telegraph unit in the Army. In 1897 units of the National Guard were mobilized in anticipation of a conflict with Chile and by then that militia had a regiment of engineers that received specific instruction in field telegraphy.

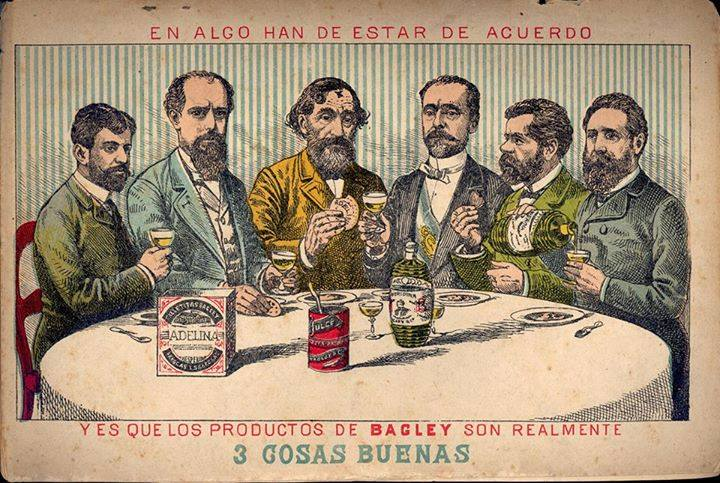
Advertisement by food company Bagley, with portraits of politicians of that age.

The encouragement of immigration was also important, including the free passage of tickets and the delivery of lands to the settlers, many of them taken from the natives in the Desert Campaign of his predecessor Roca. A major legal reform was also promoted, including the procedural organization of the Courts, the establishment of a Property Registry, the enactment of the Civil Marriage Law and the Mining, Criminal and Commerce codes.

A preliminary agreement was signed with Bolivia, which provisionally set the limit at parallel 22° south to the Pilcomayo River.

=== The Unicato ===
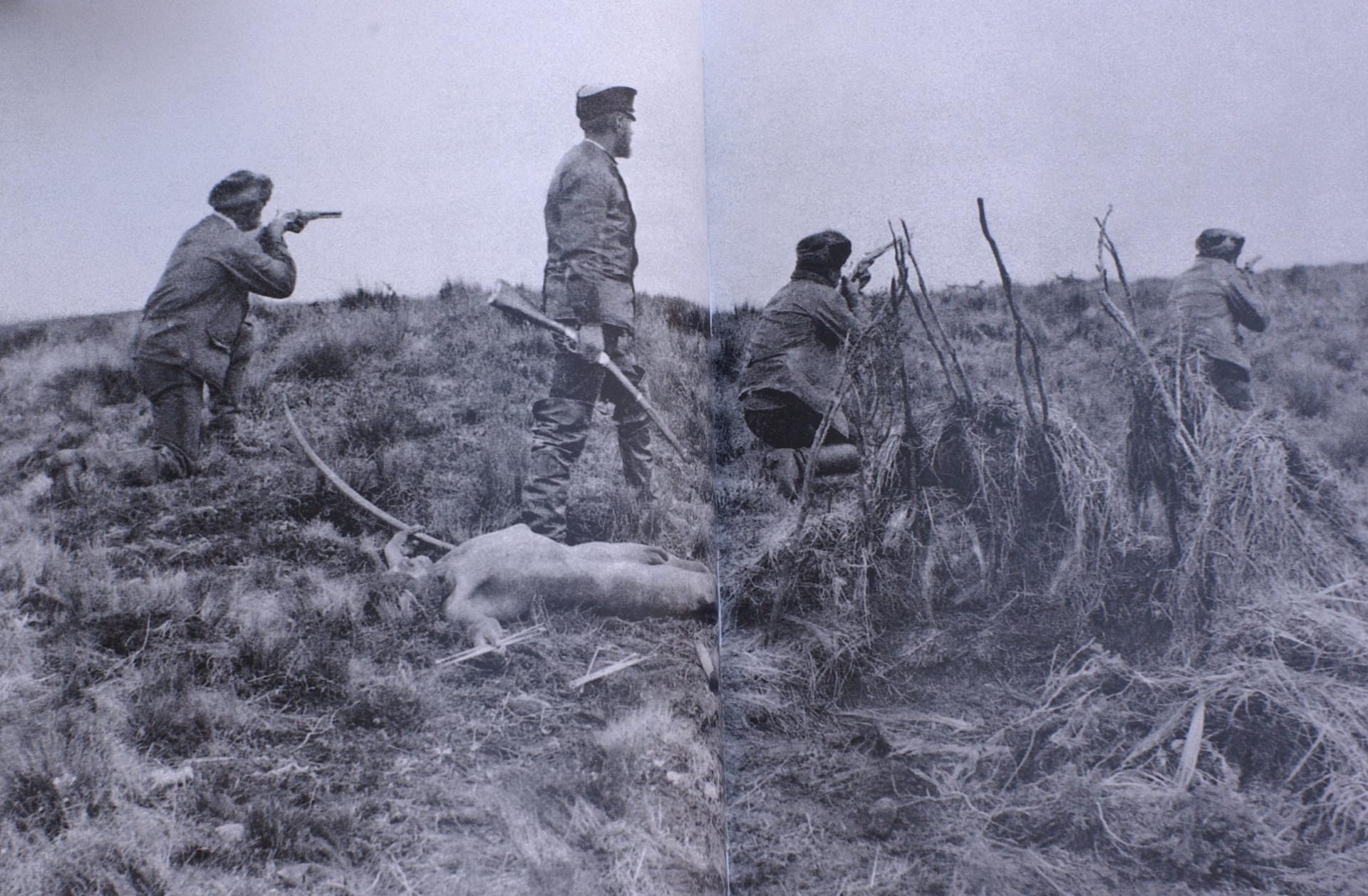
Julius Popper during one of his Indian hunts. A naked aboriginal, murdered by his militiamen, at Popper's feet.

From the first moment, his administration was characterized by an exacerbation of presidentialism. The enormous concentration of political power in his person and in officials directly appointed from the presidency, earned his government the nickname of Unicato. He was referring to his claim to concentrate all political and public power in the president, as the Sole Head of the Nation and of the National Autonomist Party.

Under Roca's negotiating government, criticism of the government's unwillingness to rule democratically had intensified from various scattered groups. Juárez Celman's claim to eliminate internal dissidents by being appointed Sole Chief of the PAN favored the meeting of various groups, which took an increasingly critical stance of the political forms of the Unicato, both in the press and in street demonstrations. From the point of view of these critics, the policy of the Unicato had led to a massive disinterest of the population in political affairs; The population, calm about the unlimited economic progress that seemed to be glimpsed, was not interested in who governed, much less in the means they used to govern.

=== Economic policy ===
Continuing to a large extent with the boom in commercial and stock market speculation of his predecessor, Juárez Celman accelerated the process through an active privatization policy. He granted the construction of dozens of railway branches. In particular, the privatization of the most successful state-owned company in Argentine history until then, the Buenos Aires Western Railway, was striking, the sale of which was justified precisely on the basis of its operating and financial surplus.

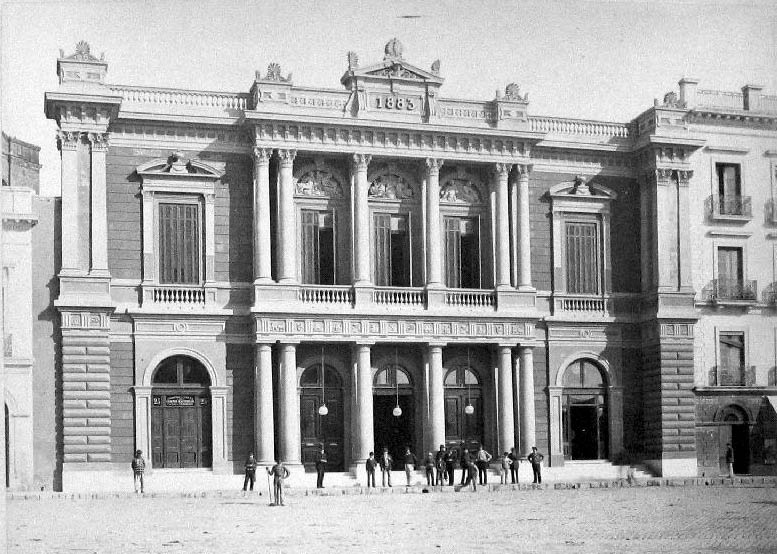
Building of the Buenos Aires Stock Exchange.

The immediate result of the alienation of the public means of production and ruinous spending was marked financial instability. But as long as external capital continued to flow into the system, it was sustained and grew at unprecedented levels: between 1886 and 1890, the national economy grew by an astonishing 44% . During the 1880s, 40% of all British capital invested in abroad were invested in Argentina. Most of the external investments were destined to finance the railroad network, which added another 3,800 km, almost 10,000 km in total extension. In addition to the railways, there were also major investments in ports, including those of Bahía Blanca, Rosario, La Plata and in Buenos Aires, began the construction of Puerto Madero.

Livestock producers were in full economic boom, with the extension of somewhat more modern production systems - the fencing had spread throughout the country, and the first windmills for water arrived - and with the incorporation of recently reclaimed land from the indigenous territory. Exports diversified somewhat, with exports of wool, frozen meat - the first refrigerator had been installed in 1881 - and cereals, whose share in exports at the end of the decade reached 16% of the total value.

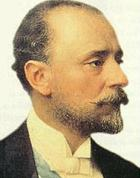
Color image of Juarez celman.

=== Financial crisis ===
The financial situation began to go into crisis at the end of 1888, when the Banco Constructor de La Plata went bankrupt, which with it took the life of its president and founder Carlos Mauricio Schweitzer. In quick succession, several financial institutions had to face payments crises, nearly leading to bankruptcy of several foreign banks; When the Baring Brothers bank assumed its mistakes by investing in the speculative bubble that Argentina had become, the arrival of foreign capital stopped completely, beginning the most critical phase of the financial crisis of 1890.

Shortly after, the Argentine State entered into default and repudiated the debts contracted by the Guaranteed Banks and the provinces, with which in fact it declared bankruptcy, from which it would only emerge several years later.

=== Revolution of 1890 and resignation ===
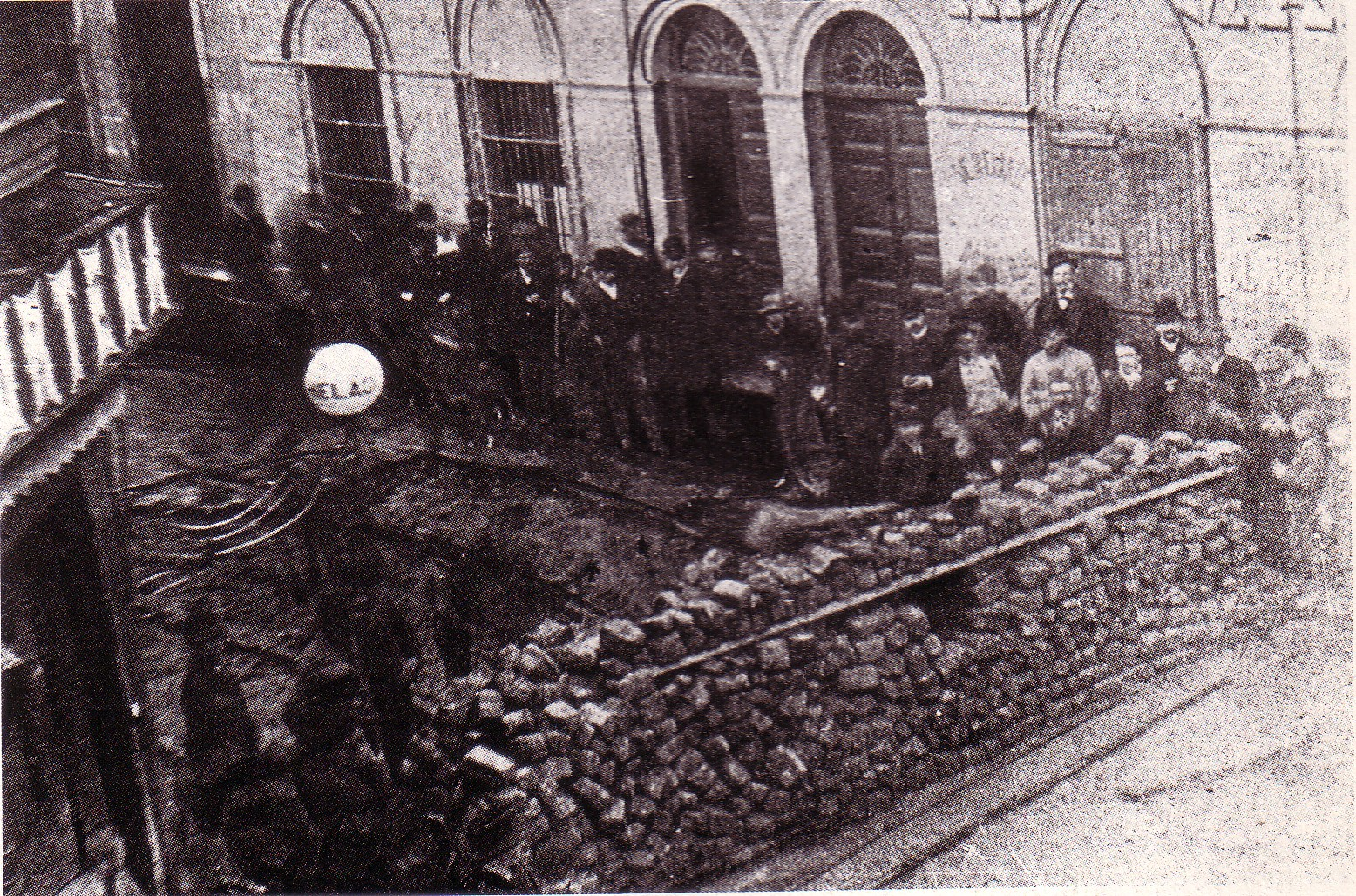
Revolutionary Barricade, Buenos Aires.

After the start of the economic crisis, the leader Francisco Barroetaveña began the formation of the so-called Civic Union of Youth, in September 1889, which would later become the Civic Union, whose most characterized leaders would be former president Bartolomé Mitre, Aristóbulo del Valle, Leandro N. Alem, Mariano Demaría, and Bernardo de Irigoyen. Even Catholic leaders like José Manuel Estrada and Pedro Goyena joined the Unión Cívica.

Towards 1890 numerous strikes were called demanding higher wages to maintain the standard of living, and the opposition grew stronger. Enmity with Roca, who had publicly called him "vile and mean," Juárez Celman found himself increasingly isolated politically. On April 13, 1890, Senator Del Valle denounced that clandestine issues of paper money were circulating alongside the legal ones, generating enormous agitation.

Considering that the possible participation in elections would be of no use when confronting the official political machine, they set out to plan a revolution. The so-called Park Revolution, which broke out on July 26, 1890, allowed the rebel leaders to control a large part of the city of Buenos Aires for three days. Despite the superiority of the rebel positions, the military leaders of the movement ignored the demands of the civilian leaders, and did not take control of the city center. The response of the loyal army forced them to capitulate on the 29th to the forces of General Nicolás Levalle. There had been between 150 and 330 deaths and more than a thousand wounded.

Juárez Celman had left the capital, forced by Roca and Carlos Pellegrini, and returned after the end of the Revolution. But, except for a few loyal deputies and ministers, he no longer had any support: former President Julio A. Roca and Vice President Carlos Pellegrini denied him their support, the press continued to lash out at him, and the economic situation worsened more and more rapidly. On August 6, he presented his resignation, which was immediately accepted by Congress, and Carlos Pellegrini assumed the presidency. He was thus the first president not to complete his term after 29 years.

== Later life and death ==
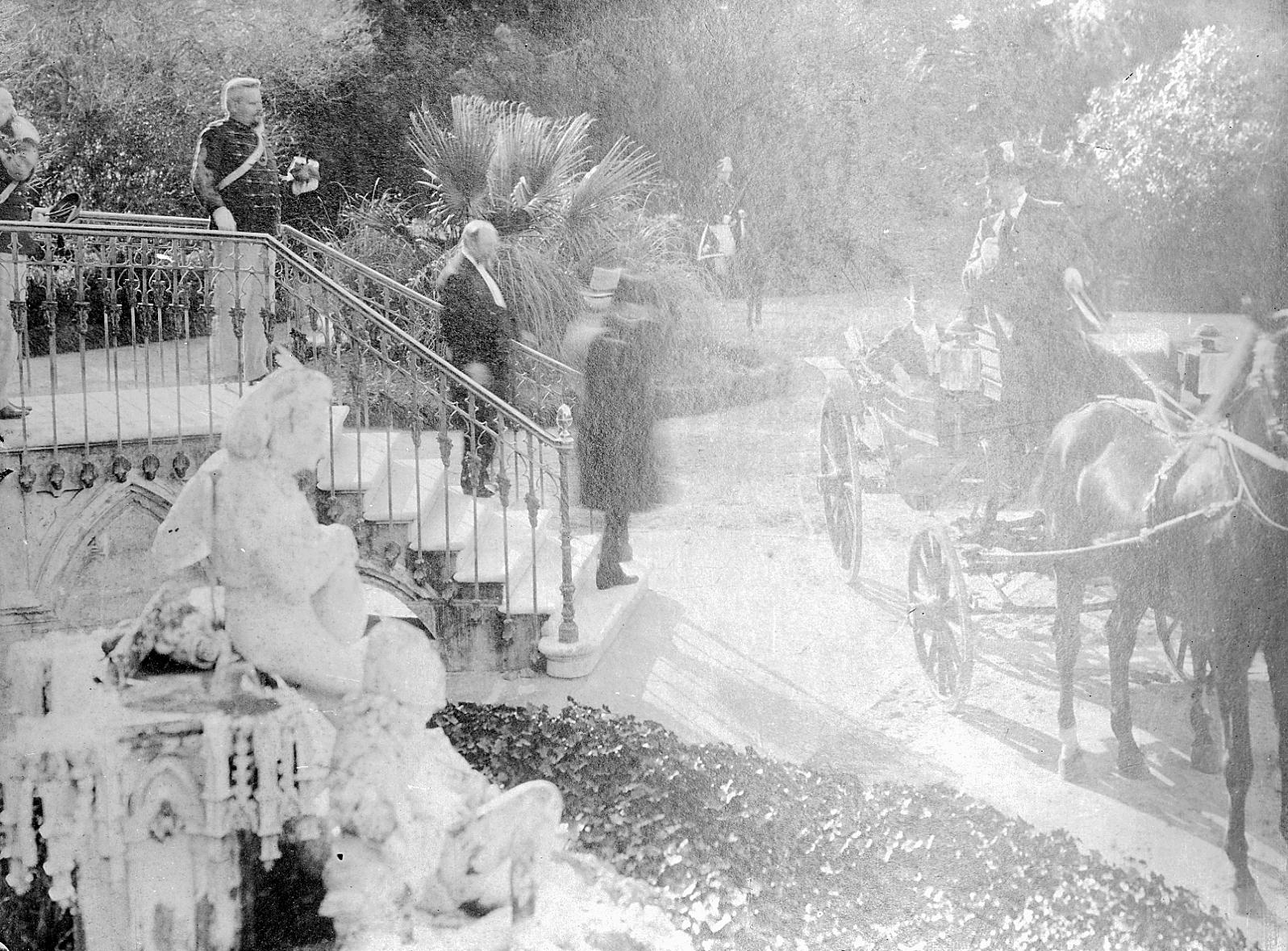
Juarez Celman getting out of a cart, 1904.

Once his resignation was accepted, that of the first constitutional president in history, he withdrew forever from political activity, despite his youth (45 years) and secluded himself in his mansion on Paseo de Julio (today Avenida Leandro Alem) in front of the Plaza Roma in Buenos Aires. He returned to the practice of his legal profession and took care of his family's agricultural businesses.

He never spoke to Roca again, whom he held responsible as head of the conspiracy that ended his presidency. His mother-in-law took Miguel's side. Doña Eloísa used to say that "Miguel was always faithful to Elisa, which I cannot say about Julio with respect to Clara."

Nor did he meet again with his vice president and replacement Carlos Pellegrini. His only activity related to the public was the claim he made at the beginning of the sessions of the National Congress each year for the accounts of his presidential term to be dealt with, with the intention of showing that he could have been a bad but honest president.

Miguel Juárez Celman died in his “La Elisa” farm in Arrecifes, on April 14, 1909. The following day he was buried in the family mausoleum of the Recoleta Cemetery.

== Legacy ==
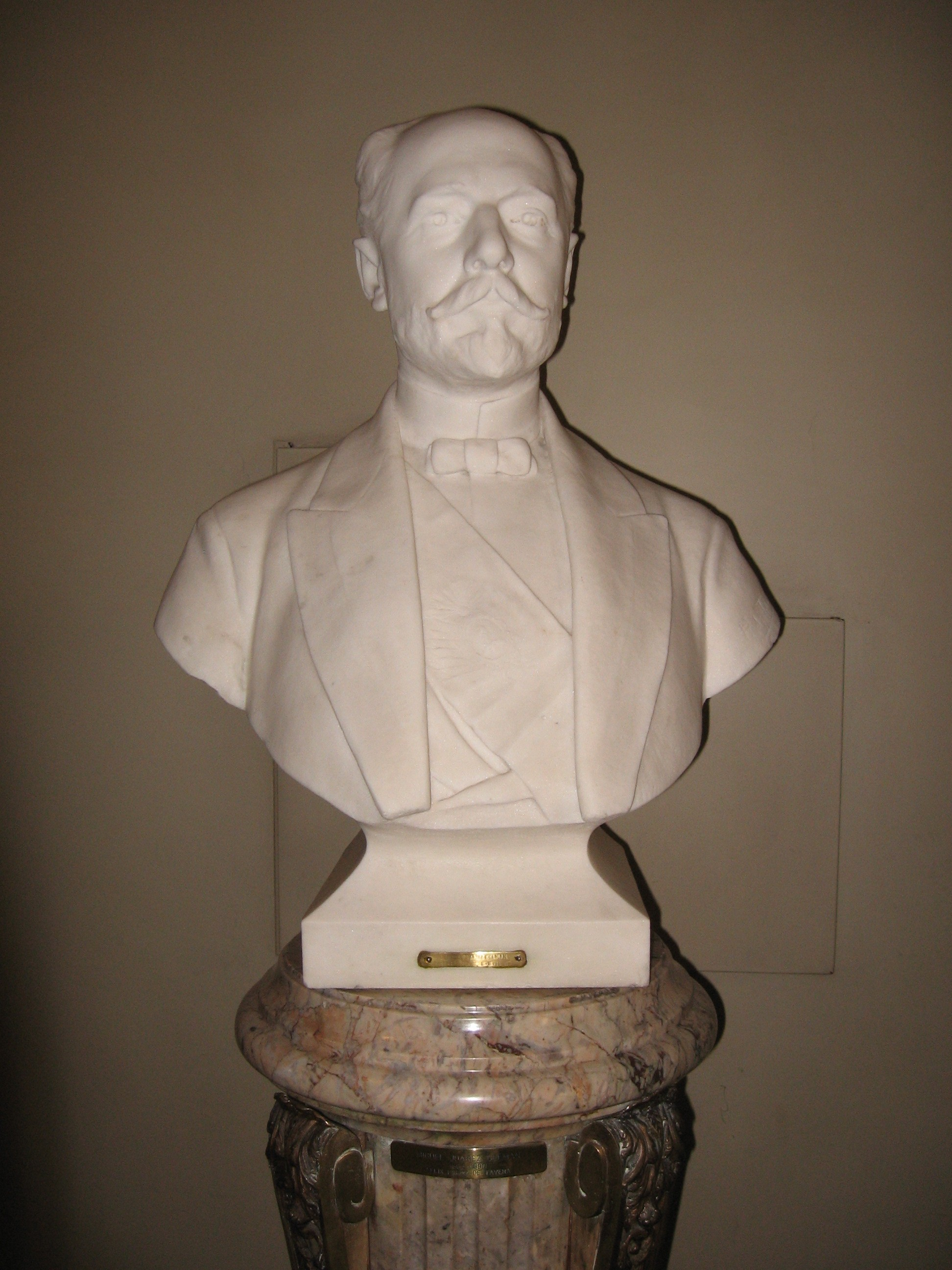
Bust of Juarez Celman in the busts room of the Casa Rosada.

The fact that Celman is the first constitutional president who did not have the capacity to finish his term led him to be the subject of much ridicule. shortly after the resignation of the president they used to be heard in the streets of Buenos Aires songs like:

¡Y se fue, y ya se fue, el burrito cordobés!, translated into english, ¡And he left, and he already left, the Cordovan donkey!; chanted, exultant, the porteños who had managed to get rid of a provincial president who they blamed for all the ills that the country suffered.

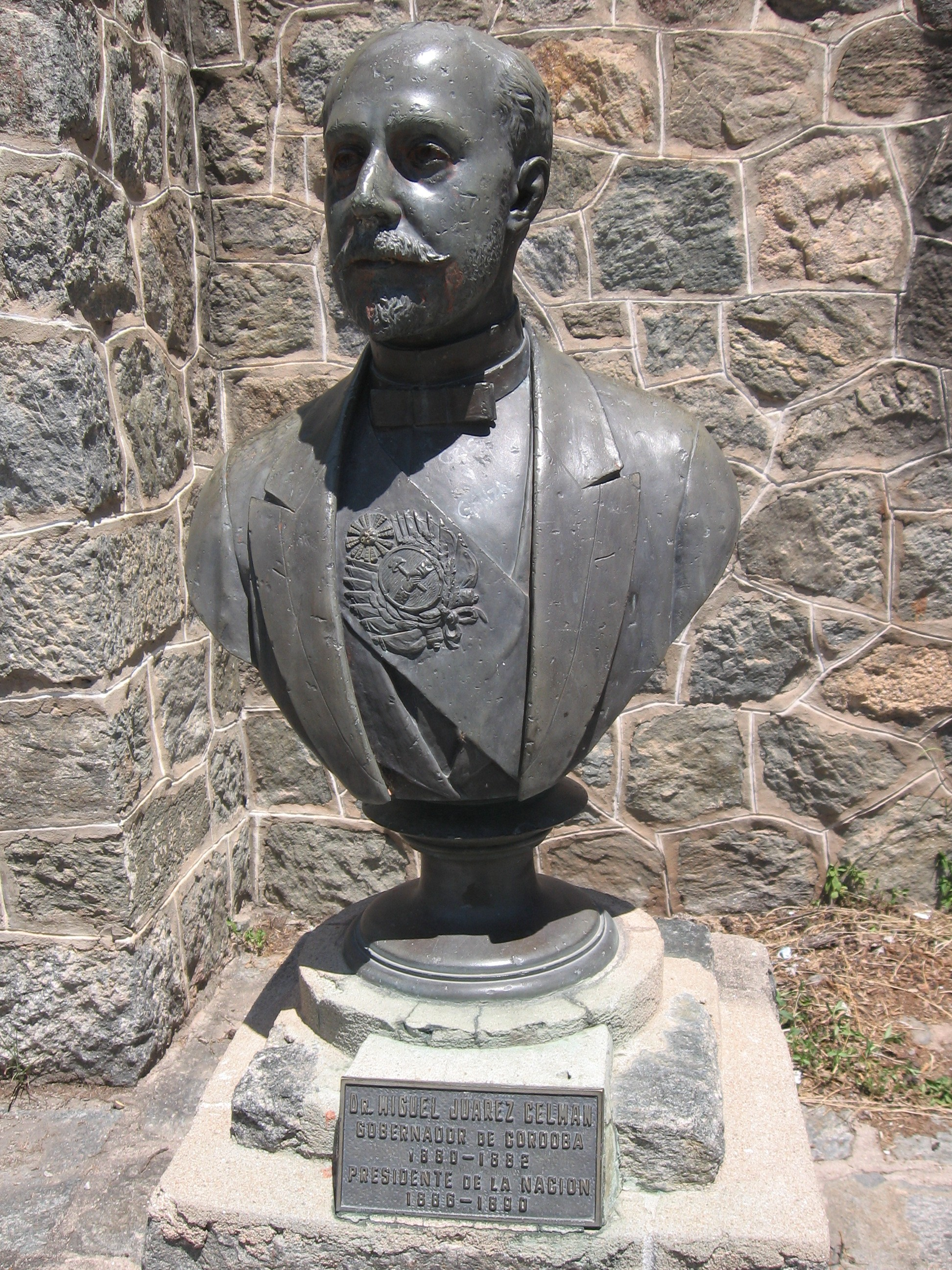
Bust of Miguel Juarez Celman, next to the San Roque Dam in the Argentine province of Córdoba.

In contrast to the abundant tributes to his predecessor and successor, Celman has a few tributes especially in his native province, Córdoba. Some of these:

- Department Juárez Celman, Córdoba.
- City Estación Juárez Celman, Córdoba.

=== Paper money ===
It appeared on the five thousand austral banknote that circulated during the hyperinflation in Argentina from 1989 to 1991.

Political offices
Preceded by Julio Argentino Roca	President of Argentina; 1886–1890	Succeeded by Carlos Pellegrini
Preceded by Antonio del Viso	Governor of Córdoba; 1880–1883	Succeeded by Gregorio Gavier
