= Honorio Pueyrredón =

Argentine lawyer, university professor, diplomat and politician

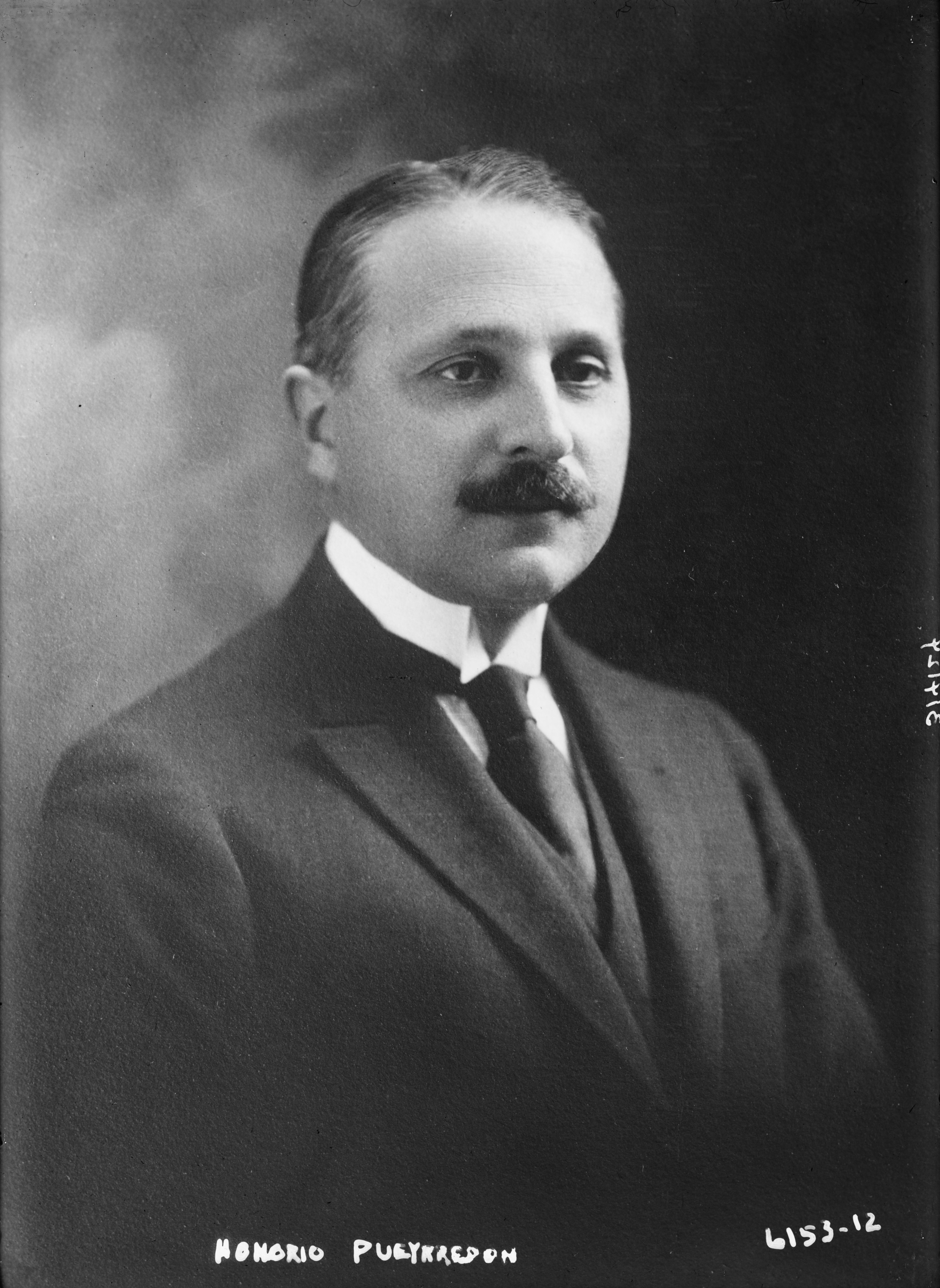

Ambassador of Argentina in the United States
- In office 10 March 1924 – 1928
- President: Marcelo T. de Alvear
- Preceded by: Tomas Le Breton
- Succeeded by: Manuel Malbrán

Minister of Foreign Affairs and Worship
- In office 30 January 1917 – 12 October 1922
- President: Hipólito Yrigoyen
- Preceded by: Carlos A. Becú
- Succeeded by: Ángel Gallardo

Minister of Agriculture of Argentina
- In office 12 October 1916 – 13 September 1917
- President: Hipólito Yrigoyen
- Preceded by: Horacio Calderón
- Succeeded by: Alfredo Demarchi

Personal details
- Born: Honorio Pueyrredón; July 9, 1876 San Pedro, Buenos Aires, Argentina
- Died: September 23, 1945 (aged 69) Buenos Aires
- Party: Radical Civic Union
- Other political affiliations: National Civic Union
- Education: University of Buenos Aires
- Profession: Lawyer, diplomat, politician and footballer

Honorio Pueyrredón (June 9, 1876 – September 23, 1945) was an Argentine lawyer, university professor, diplomat and politician.

Born in San Pedro, Buenos Aires, Pueyrredón graduated at the Faculty of Law of the University of Buenos Aires in 1896, where he would also later teach.

Originally affiliated to the National Civic Union, he later became a prominent figure in the Radical Civic Union, and was named Minister of Agriculture in 1916 by President Hipólito Yrigoyen, and was Minister of Foreign Affairs between 1917 and 1922. During this last term Pueyrredón was also chief of the Argentine delegation at the first gathering of the League of Nations in Geneva, where he served as vice-president of the first assembly of 1920.

In 1922 Pueyrredón was named Argentine Ambassador to the United States, a post he also held in Cuba years later. He was also president of the Argentine delegation to the XI Pan-American Conference held in Havana in 1928.

Pueyrredón was elected governor of the Province of Buenos Aires in 1930, but the elections were invalidated by dictator José Félix Uriburu, whose coup d'etat toppled Yrigoyen. He continued his political activity, firmly following Yrigoyen ideas, until he was exiled during the Década Infame because of his political tendencies. He returned to Argentina several years later, and died in Buenos Aires in 1945.

== Biographical sources ==
- Historical Dictionary of Argentina. London: Scarecrow Press, 1978.
