= Revolution of the Park =

Uprising in Argentina on July 26, 1890

- Part of Panic of 1890
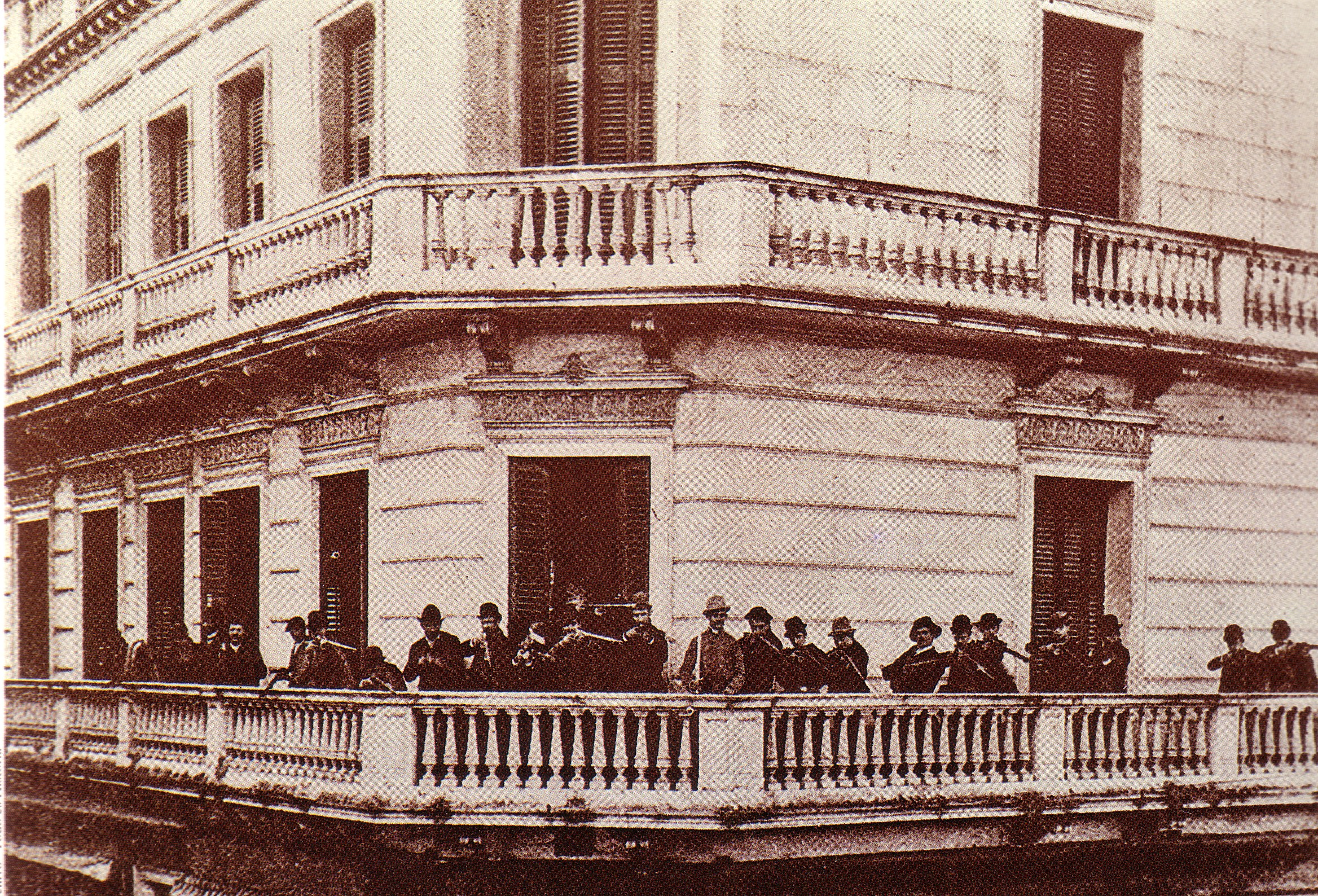
- Revolutionaries in a building at Piedad (today Mitre) and Talcahuano streets
| Date | 26–29 July 1890 |
| Location | Lavalle Square, Buenos Aires |
| Action | Attempted coup to depose the government of the National Autonomist Party |
| Result | Revolution militarily defeated; President Miguel Juárez Celman resigns (August 6) Vice President Carlos Pellegrini assumes presidency Formation of modern Argentine political parties |

Government-Insurgents
| Government of Argentina; National Autonomist Party | Civic Union; Rebel military units |

Commanders and leaders
| (Argentina) Miguel Juárez Celman (Argentina) Carlos Pellegrini (Argentina) Julio Argentino Roca (Argentina) Nicolás Levalle (Argentina) Roque Sáenz Peña | Leandro Alem; Gen. Manuel J. Campos; Bartolomé Mitre (indirect support); Aristóbulo del Valle; Hipólito Yrigoyen |

Military support
| ~3,000 loyal soldiers and police | ~3,000 civilian militia Rebel military units |

Casualties and losses
- 150–300 dead 1,000+ wounded (estimates vary)

The Revolution of the Park (Revolución del Parque), also known as the Revolution of 1890 or Revolution of '90, was a civic-military uprising against the national government of Argentina that took place from July 26 to 29, 1890. The revolution began with the takeover of the Buenos Aires Artillery Park (Parque de Artillería), located in what is today Lavalle Square. Led by the recently formed Civic Union against the presidency of Miguel Juárez Celman of the National Autonomist Party, the uprising was militarily defeated but achieved its political objective: Celman's resignation on August 6, 1890. The revolution marked a turning point in Argentine political history and led to the eventual formation of the Radical Civic Union.

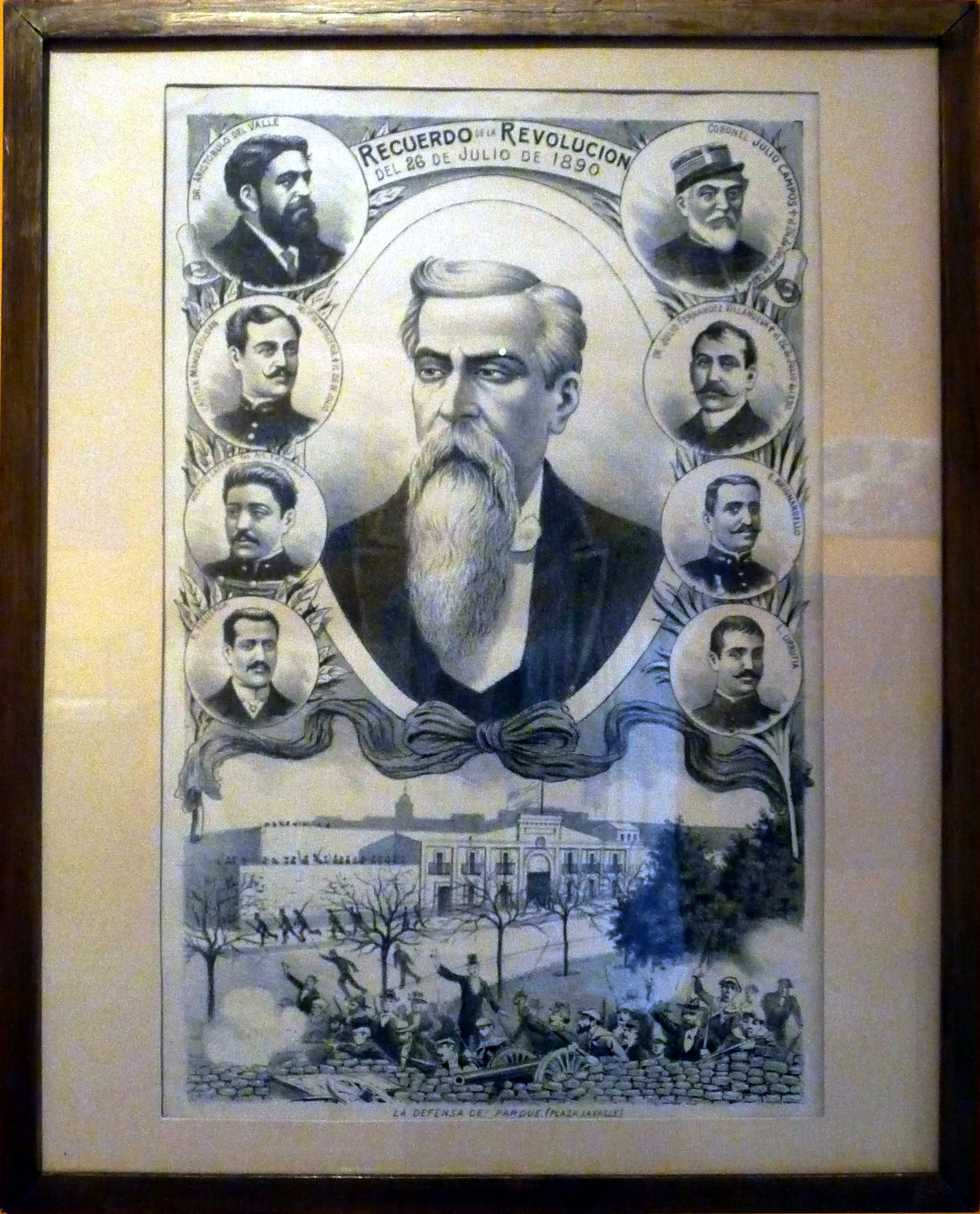
Lithograph commemorating the Revolution of the Park (from Argentina's National Historical Museum)

== Background ==
=== Economic crisis ===
By 1889, Argentina was experiencing a severe economic crisis, characterized by high inflation, unemployment, falling wages, and increasingly violent labor strikes. The crisis had its roots in the economic policies of President Julio Argentino Roca (1880-1886) and was exacerbated under his successor and brother-in-law, Miguel Juárez Celman. The National Bank Law of 1887 (Ley de Bancos Nacionales Garantidos) authorized banks to issue currency in exchange for depositing gold in the National Treasury, which then issued public bonds against which banking entities could print money. This policy led to irresponsible fiscal management and uncontrolled monetary emission. Provincial banks in Tucumán, Salta, Mendoza, and Buenos Aires, among others, issued legal tender currency, triggering rampant inflation. The festival of provincial and private emissions continued until 1890, when the government of Carlos Pellegrini established a Conversion Office (Caja de Conversión). Starting in 1888, the economic crisis deepened. In December 1888, the Banco Constructor de La Plata collapsed, with its stock plummeting from 235 to 160 points. In June 1890, the Argentine government entered into a default on its external debt, particularly affecting the prestigious Barings Bank in London, which had invested heavily in Argentine speculative bonds. This triggered a major banking and stock market run that collapsed stock values and left several banks in desperate condition.

=== Political crisis ===
President Juárez Celman's administration (1886-1890) was characterized by extreme presidentialism and centralization of power, known as the "Unicato" (single-man rule). His government was marked by accusations of corruption, electoral fraud, and authoritarianism—practices that had characterized Argentine politics since the Generation of '80 took power. During this period, Argentina lacked free, universal, secret, and compulsory suffrage. Votes were cast publicly before political authorities, and fraud was systematic. This electoral system maintained the conservative National Autonomist Party in perpetual power and excluded the majority of the population from meaningful political participation.

== Formation of the Civic Union ==
In response to the economic and political crisis, opposition forces began organizing in 1889. In September of that year, political leader Francisco Barroetaveña initiated the formation of the Unión Cívica de la Juventud (Civic Union of the Youth), which would later transform into the Civic Union. On April 13, 1890, a massive rally was held at the Frontón Buenos Aires (on Viamonte Street, between Libertad and Cerrito) where the Civic Union was formally founded. The meeting brought together diverse opposition groups: Catholic activists (Pedro Goyena and José Manuel Estrada), displaced conservatives (Bartolomé Mitre, Bernardo de Irigoyen, Vicente Fidel López), youth civic activists (Francisco Barroetaveña), legendary General Juan Andrés Gelly y Obes, and future radicals (Aristóbulo del Valle, Leandro N. Alem, and Mariano de María). The event concluded with a massive march to Plaza de Mayo, led by Mitre, Alem, Estrada, Vicente F. López, and Del Valle walking arm-in-arm. The demonstration's magnitude shocked the government, resulting in the mass resignation of all of Juárez Celman's cabinet ministers. On May 29, 1890, Senator Aristóbulo del Valle denounced in Congress that the government was conducting clandestine currency emissions, identifying this as the principal cause of the crisis's severity. Del Valle's denunciation had enormous impact on public opinion and deepened the government's discredit in the following months.

== Planning and preparation ==
A revolutionary junta was formed to direct the movement, coordinating with the "Logia de los 33 Oficiales" (Lodge of the 33 Officers), a secret group within the Army. The junta included Leandro Alem (civilian leader), General Manuel J. Campos (military leader), Aristóbulo del Valle, Pedro Goyena, Hipólito Yrigoyen, and Manuel Ocampo, among others. One member of this military lodge was a 22-year-old lieutenant from Salta named José Félix Uriburu, who would ironically depose his comrade from the Revolution of the Park, Hipólito Yrigoyen, forty years later in the coup of 1930. During these days, Alem secured the support of Brigadier General Domingo Viejobueno, chief of the Artillery Park located in Plaza Lavalle, less than one kilometer from the Casa Rosada. The military lodge promised support from two infantry regiments, one artillery regiment, one engineering battalion, one company, some cadets from the Military College, and naval units. On July 17, 1890, General Campos met with approximately 60 officers from the Army and Navy to communicate the action plan. The revolution would break out on July 26 at 4:00 AM. Rebel forces would concentrate at the Artillery Park where the Revolutionary Junta would install itself and issue orders. Simultaneously, the fleet was to bombard the Casa Rosada and the Retiro barracks to prevent government troops from assembling. At the same time, militia groups were to take prisoner President Juárez Celman, Vice President Pellegrini, War Minister General Levalle, and Senate President Julio A. Roca, and cut railway and telegraph lines. The marginal role assigned to the militias was resisted by Alem, who wanted to give the revolution a strong civilian character, but ultimately the opinion of the military chiefs prevailed. To distinguish themselves from troops loyal to the regime, the Revolutionary Junta of the Civic Union acquired white berets, as they were the only ones available in sufficient quantity in local shops for the more than 3,000 militiamen estimated to have participated in the revolt.

== Uprising and repression ==
=== Day 1: July 26 ===
The armed uprising began in the early morning of Saturday, July 26, 1890. At 4:00 AM, while still dark, Alem commanding an armed civic regiment took the strategic Artillery Park of Buenos Aires, in what is today Lavalle Square. Simultaneously, Colonel Figueroa rebelled with the 9th Infantry Regiment, while Del Valle and Yrigoyen did likewise with cadets from the Military College. All these troops converged and marched toward the Park. Between 4:00 AM and 8:00 AM, troops from both sides took positions. The center of confrontations was located in Plaza Lavalle and Plaza Libertad and adjacent streets, belonging to the San Nicolás neighborhood. Naval fleet action, also in rebellion, added to the conflict. The government forces, led by Vice President Carlos Pellegrini, General Roque Sáenz Peña, and General Nicolás Levalle, began assembling in the Retiro area. Meanwhile, President Juárez Celman left Buenos Aires for Córdoba, leaving repression in the hands of those who would ultimately contribute to his downfall.

=== Days 2-3: July 27-29 ===
Confrontations continued over the following days. Although the initial revolutionary plan had been to take the Casa Rosada to provoke the government's fall, General Campos ordered the troops to remain in the Park until enemy forces advanced—a decision that proved strategically problematic. By a serious miscalculation or perhaps a betrayal by the military wing of the revolt, the revolutionaries found that by the third day of combat ammunition was scarce. There was not the anticipated quantity within the artillery park, and reinforcements of loyal troops from the interior were arriving. This accelerated the surrender. On Tuesday, July 29, 1890, the capitulation was signed at Palacio Miró, stipulating conditions for surrender and the disarmament process of the troops. Despite the capitulation signed by revolutionary leaders, some cantons refused to disarm and continued fighting, some even until the following day. Among the medical practitioners who participated in medical care supporting the revolution were some future prestigious physicians such as Elvira Rawson, Máximo Castro, Joaquín V. Gnecco, Nicolás Repetto, and Miguel Z. O'Farrel, among others. However, "the doctors...in the humanitarian task of aiding the wounded had neither side nor party. All doctors attended to all wounded."

== Aftermath and consequences ==
=== Juárez Celman's resignation ===
Although the revolution was militarily defeated, its political impact was immediate and profound. Upon returning to Buenos Aires, President Juárez Celman found that both his predecessor Julio A. Roca and his Vice President Carlos Pellegrini—two of his principal allies—had withdrawn their support. Combined with the rapid deterioration of the economic situation, Juárez Celman presented his resignation on August 6, 1890, which was immediately accepted by Congress. He was the first Argentine constitutional president since the country's unification in 1862 who failed to complete his term in office. A lapidary phrase from Cordoban Senator Manuel Pizarro captured the moment: "Gentlemen: the revolution is defeated, but the government is dead." Vice President Carlos Pellegrini assumed the presidency to complete the remaining two years of the term. Despite the armistice signed at Palacio Miró establishing that no reprisals would be taken against the revolutionaries, in the following months numerous arrests occurred and some were forced into exile.

=== Political realignment ===
Carlos Pellegrini, upon taking office, declared his was "a government of concord, born from a revolution," and granted amnesty to the revolutionaries seeking pacification. However, the new scenario created by the revolution sharpened internal differences within the Civic Union leadership, formalizing a rupture the following year. The Mitre faction, more inclined to pact with the conservative regime, formed the Unión Cívica Nacional (National Civic Union), while those led by Leandro N. Alem, who rejected any pact with the regime and desired fundamental change to the political system, formed the Radical Civic Union (Unión Cívica Radical), which continues to champion the principles of the 1890 uprising and survives to the present day.

=== Long-term impact ===
The Revolution of the Park marked the emergence of the people as a political and social subject in Argentina, demanding recognition as protagonists of political, social, and cultural life, and calling for the configuration of a democratic society. The period following the revolution saw the organization of the working class into unions, the formation of modern political parties, the establishment of the first cooperatives, feminist organizations, and opposition political magazines, creating a complex urban society that made taking power through street revolutions increasingly unviable. The key elements outlined in the revolutionary Manifesto—electoral fraud, corruption, and the lack of representative democracy—continued to plague Argentine politics, leading to further uprisings: the Revolution of 1893 and the Revolution of 1905. These struggles would eventually culminate in the passage of the Sáenz Peña Law in 1912, which established universal, secret, and compulsory male suffrage in Argentina.

== Goals and manifesto ==
The Revolution of the Park was intended as a means to "avoid the ruin of the country" by bringing down "a government that represents illegality and corruption," according to its Manifesto. The revolutionary junta rejected "living without voice or vote..., witness the disappearance of rules, principles, guarantees..., tolerate the usurpation of our political rights..., and keeping those in power who have wrought the disgrace of the republic", and denounced that "there is no republic, no federal system, no representative government, no administration, no morality. Political life has turned into a for-profit industry."

== See also ==
- Radical Civic Union
- Panic of 1890
- Generation of '80
- Sáenz Peña Law
- Miguel Juárez Celman
- Carlos Pellegrini
