= Leandro N. Alem =

Argentine politician and founder of the Radical Civic Union

Leandro Nicéforo Alem
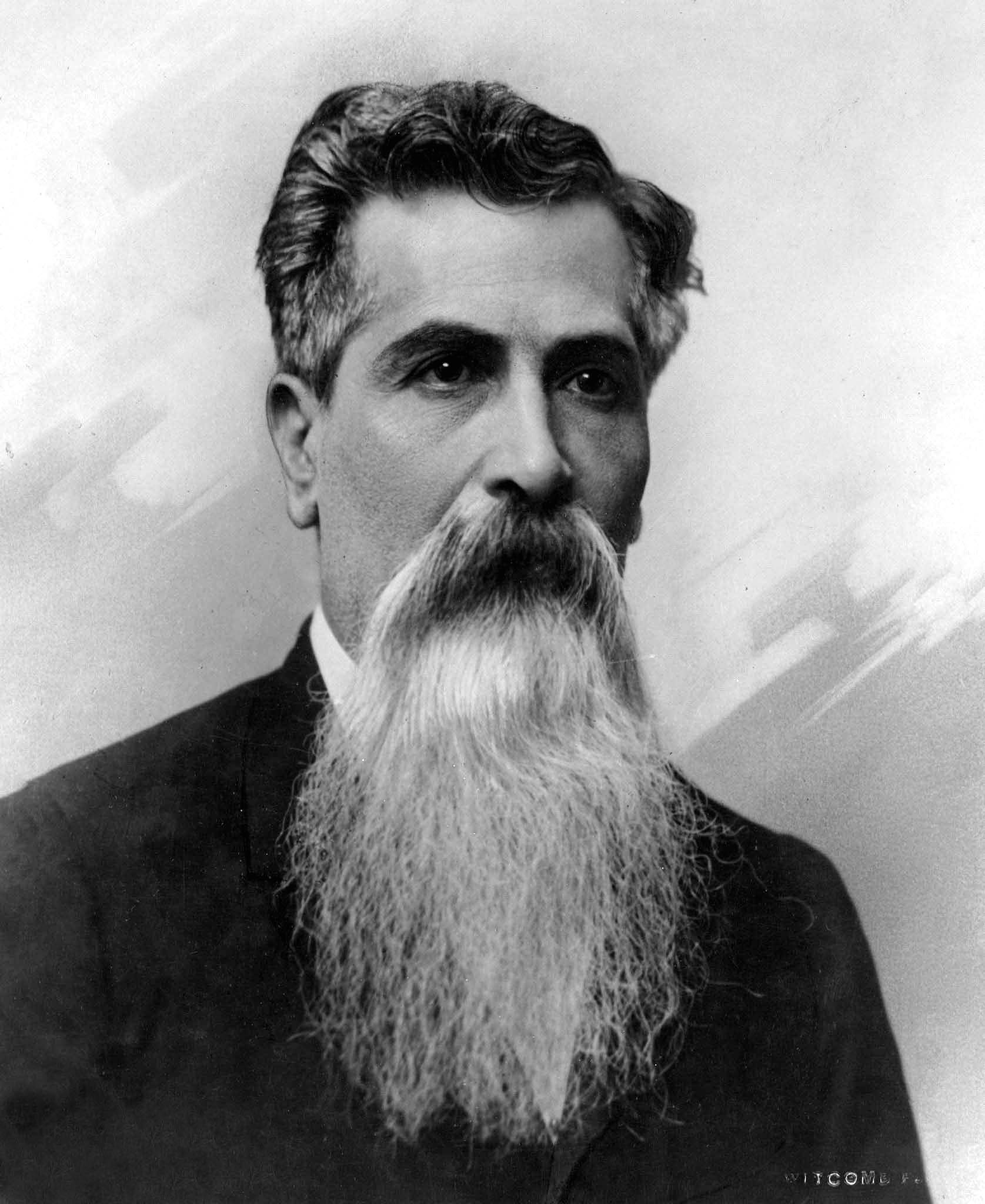
- Born: 11 March 1841
- Died: 1 July 1896 (aged 55)
- Occupation: Politician

Leandro Nicéforo Alem (born Leandro Alén; 11 March 1841 – 1 July 1896) was an Argentine politician, founder and leader of the Radical Civic Union. He was the uncle and political mentor of Hipólito Yrigoyen. Alem was also an active Freemason.

== Biography ==
Leandro Nicéforo Alem was born in Buenos Aires, the son of Tomasa Ponce, a woman of indigenous ancestry and Leandro Antonio Alén, a grocer (pulpero) whose father was an immigrant from Galicia. Alén became a prominent member of Governor of Buenos Aires Province Juan Manuel de Rosas' political police, the Mazorca. Rosas dismissed him from the Mazorca in 1847 after a series of nervous brekdowns. Alén was executed by firing squad in 1853 in Buenos Aires by the Unitarians, in the turmoil that followed the battle of Caseros. The young Leandro changed his surname from Alén to Alem to mitigate associations with him.

In 1859, being only 18 years old, Alem took part in the battles of Cepeda and Pavón, and in 1865, he joined the war against Paraguay. After this, he returned to Buenos Aires to finish his law studies. He had democratic, anti-authoritarian ideas, and in 1868, he joined Adolfo Alsina's Autonomist Party, where he showed a skill for incisive rhetorics in public debates.

Alem was elected diputado (representative) at the provincial legislature of Buenos Aires in 1871. In 1874, he went on to become National Representative, and then Senator. He opposed the federalization of the city of Buenos Aires, required by the Constitution. When the bill was passed by the legislature, Alem resigned his seat and became the intellectual leader of a group of discontents that sought to produce changes in Argentine politics. In 1877, he and his friend Aristóbulo del Valle founded the Republican Party.

In 1889, Argentina was going through a deep political and economic crisis, worsened by the corruption and abuse of power of President Miguel Juárez Celman. In this context, Alem organized the Civic Union of the Youth, (from which the prominent Radical Civic Union would emerge). In July 1890, Alem was one of the leaders of the Revolución del Parque revolt that forced Juárez Celman to resign. When Vice-President Carlos Pellegrini took charge in his stead, Alem renewed his opposition, lending support to uprisings against the national government in the provinces.

After a failed uprising in 1893, Alem saw many of his supporters leave him. Feeling disappointed and betrayed, he committed suicide on 1 July 1896 by shooting himself in his right temple inside a carriage. His remains are buried in the Memorial to the Fallen in the 1890 Revolution, in the La Recoleta Cemetery of Buenos Aires.

== Legacy ==
He is considered an unshakable champion of freedom and democracy; an emblem of Argentine democracy and founder of the first modern democratic party, whose basic and unshakable pillars are freedom and equality. Alem has been hailed as a dreamer who left everything to bet on the political struggle.

There are two cities called Leandro N. Alem in Argentina, one in the province of Misiones and another one in the north-west of Buenos Aires (with the same name as the partido where it belongs). There is also a small town in San Luis with this name.

Parque Alem, one of two large parks in Rosario, Santa Fe, is named after Alem, and has a heroic statue of him, trying to bend a quebracho log, representing the motto of the Radical Civic Union, Se quiebra pero no se dobla ("It breaks but it does not bend", an expression of commitment to principles). The sculptor was Guillermo Gianninazzi.

== Sources ==
- Leandro Alem, el fundador – A romantic biography. Links to poems, speeches, eulogies, etc.
- Biography at Clarín's website.
