= Bernardo de Irigoyen =

Argentine lawyer, diplomat and politician

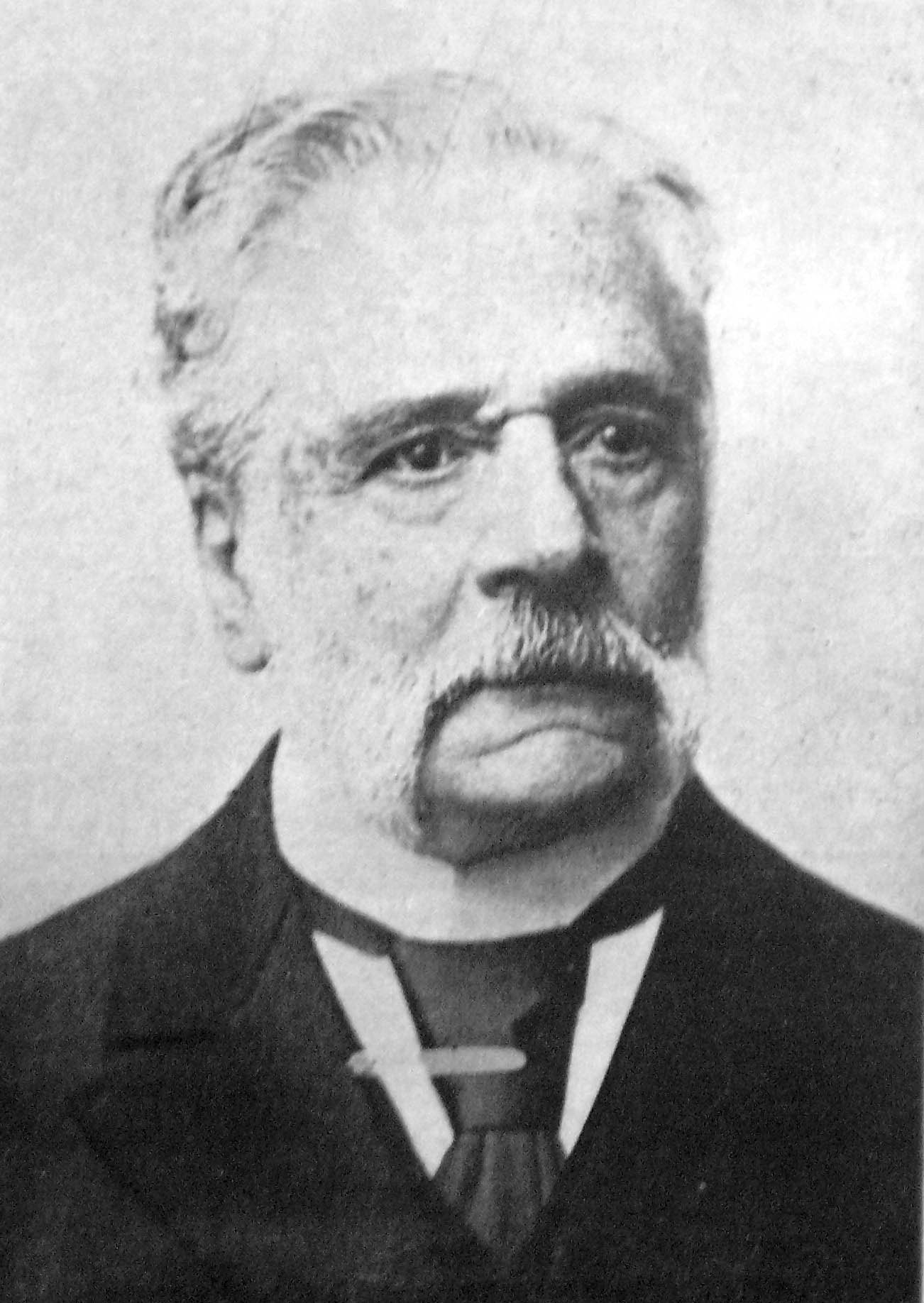
Bernardo de Irigoyen

Bernardo de Irigoyen (December 18, 1822 – December 27, 1906) was an Argentine lawyer, diplomat and politician.

== Biography ==
Born in Buenos Aires, Irigoyen enrolled at the University of Buenos Aires and earned a juris doctor in 1843. He was commissioned by Governor Juan Manuel de Rosas to settle a boundary dispute with Chile (Rosas was charged with the Argentine Confederation's foreign policy during his 1835–1852 reign), and from 1844 to 1850, Irigoyen served as Justice Minister in Mendoza Province, where he enacted the first provincial judicial system, as well as reformist military law and land law statutes.

He again negotiated with Chile over the disputed Straits of Magellan (1851), and following Rosas' overthrow, helped draft the 1852 San Nicolás Agreement. He participated in the constitutional assembly that paved the way for the 1860 reunification with secessionist Buenos Aires Province, and was nominated to the Argentine Supreme Court; he refused, however, and resumed his private practice.

Irigoyen returned to public life in 1870 as a provincial legislator, and in 1875, was appointed Minister of Foreign Affairs by President Nicolás Avellaneda. He negotiated boundary treaties with Brazil and Paraguay in the wake of the Paraguayan War against the latter nation, and was named Internal Affairs Minister in 1879, during which tenure he drafted the 1880 federalization of Buenos Aires. He was returned to the Foreign Minister's post by Avellaneda's successor, President Julio Roca, and secured the boundary treaty of 1881 between Chile and Argentina.

He was elected to the Argentine Senate in 1884, and ran unsuccessfully for President in 1886. He later represented Argentina in talks with U.S. Secretary of State James Blaine for the formation of a Pan-American Congress; ultimately, however, the Argentine relationship with the British Empire led Irigoyen, who was otherwise amenable to the idea, to reject Blaine's proposals for closer economic ties with the United States.

Irigoyen joined Bartolomé Mitre, Leandro Alem, and others in establishing the Civic Union in 1890. Formed to challenge the paramount National Autonomist Party (PAN), the Civic Union organized its first presidential ticket in 1892. Irigoyen was nominated as Mitre's running mate, though before the campaign could begin in earnest, Alem's opposition led to Mitre's quitting the race. Irigoyen attempted to create a coalition of more conservative Civic Union figures and reformists from within the ruling PAN. His faction, however, was overshadowed by Hipólito Yrigoyen's newly formed Radical Civic Union, which espoused a policy of "breaking before bending" on the subject of electoral reforms to the undemocratic system then prevailing.

The aging lawmaker ran instead, in 1898, for Governor of Buenos Aires Province, and was elected, serving until 1902. Bernardo de Irigoyen retired afterwards and died in Buenos Aires in 1906. His death deprived the influential former President Roca of one of his most respected allies, and Roca's hegemony over national policy ended shortly afterwards.
