= National Autonomist Party =

Political party in Argentina

National Autonomist Party Partido Autonomista Nacional
- Abbreviation: PAN
- Historical leaders: Julio Argentino Roca (first); Victorino de la Plaza (last)
- Founder: Nicolás Avellaneda, Adolfo Alsina
- Founded: 15 March 1874
- Dissolved: 1916 (de facto); 31 July 1931 (de jure)
- Merger of: Autonomist Party; National Party
- Succeeded by: Democratic Party
- Headquarters: Buenos Aires
- Ideology: Liberalism; Conservatism; Conservative liberalism Secularism; Positivism
- Political position: Centre-right to right-wing
- Colors: Light blue and white

The National Autonomist Party (Spanish: Partido Autonomista Nacional; PAN) was the ruling political party of Argentina from 1874 to 1916.

In 1880, Julio Argentino Roca assumed the presidency under the motto "peace and administration".

== History ==
The PAN was created on March 15, 1874 by the union of the Autonomist Party of Adolfo Alsina and the National Party of Nicolás Avellaneda. Its principal figure was Julio Argentino Roca, twice president of Argentina.

Political scientist Luis L. Schenoni situates the party's emergence within a broader postwar convergence between autonomistas and nacionalistas following Argentina's victory in the Paraguayan War, arguing that the PAN helped consolidate the state-building coalition that emerged from this process.

In economic matters it promoted the agricultural exports model, which favored the cattle and cereal producers of the Pampas and was a key in the development of the Argentine Railroad.

The party has been described as an "organ of the elite, an oligarchy of wealth and power."

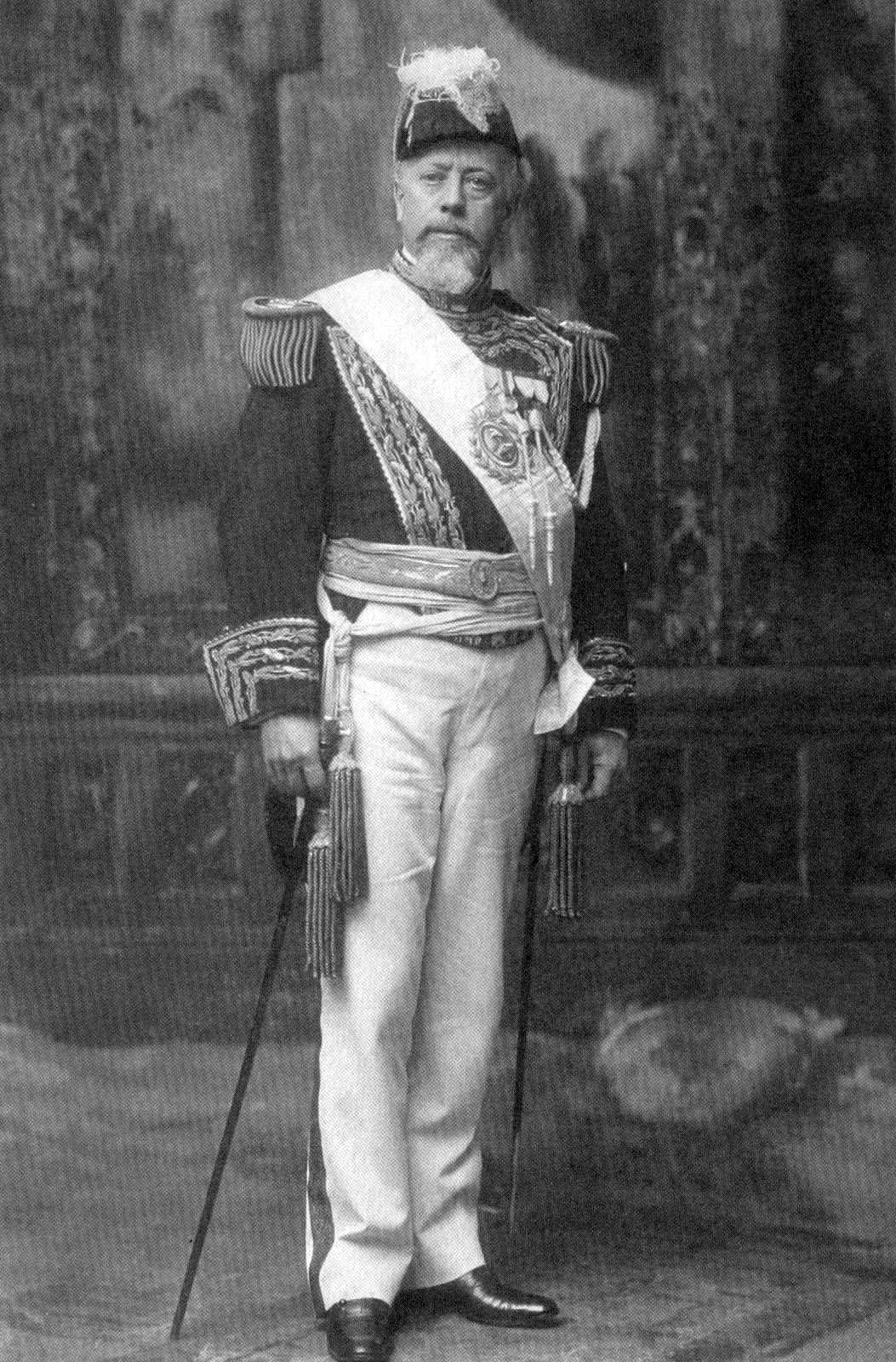
Julio A. Roca, principal figure of the National Autonomist Party

After the 1890 Revolución del Parque, a movement started inside the PAN opposed to the policies of Roca, which became known as the National Autonomist Party (modern faction) (PAN - línea modernista), which proposed institutional modernization of the country, with goals towards opening up a true democratic system without electoral fraud as a means of perpetuating the party's power. Most preeminent in this political current were Roque Sáenz Peña, Carlos Pellegrini, Ramón J. Cárcano, among others. Under the administration of Sáenz Peña, a law was written to allow for secret universal suffrage, which permitted the free elections of 1916.

Its principal opposition was the Radical Civic Union (Spanish: Unión Cívica Radical, UCR), created after the 1890 revolution. After the electoral reform of 1912, and the presidential elections of 1916, which was won by the UCR, the PAN fractured and disappeared from politics.

=== Presidents from the PAN ===
- Nicolás Avellaneda (1874–1880)
- Julio Argentino Roca (1880–1886, 1898–1904)
- Miguel Juárez Celman (1886–1890)
- Carlos Pellegrini (1890–1892)
- Luis Sáenz Peña (1892–1895)
- José Evaristo Uriburu (1895–1898)
- Manuel Quintana (1904–1906)
- José Figueroa Alcorta (1906–1910)
- Roque Sáenz Peña (1910–1914)
- Victorino de la Plaza (1914–1916)

== Successor parties ==
Following the introduction of the Sáenz Peña Law in 1912, much of PAN would reorganise as the Conservative Party. Another faction would be the descendant of the Democratic Progressive Party which still exists today. In 1931, following the previous year's military coup, the conservatives returned to power under the banner of the National Democratic Party, leading the Concordancia coalition. The traditional conservative forces were politically marginalized following World War II and the rise of Peronism, and after 1955 the PDN fell apart. Conservative parties descended from these continue to exist in Argentina today.

== See also ==
- Generation of '80
- History of Argentina
- List of heads of state of Argentina
- Autonomist Party of Corrientes
