= 1878 in Argentina =

- Decades: 1850s; 1860s; 1870s; 1880s; 1890s
- See also: Other events of 1878; List of years in Argentina

Events in the year 1878 in Argentina.

== Incumbents ==
- President: Nicolás Avellaneda
- Vice President: Mariano Acosta

=== Governors ===
- Buenos Aires Province: Carlos Casares (until 1 May); Carlos Tejedor (from 1 May)
- Cordoba: Antonio Del Viso
- Mendoza Province: Julio Gutiérrez (until 15 February); Elías Villanueva (from 15 February)
- Santa Fe Province: Servando Bayo then Simón de Iriondo

=== Vice Governors ===
- Buenos Aires Province: Luis Sáenz Peña (until 1 May); José María Moreno (starting 1 May)

== Events ==
- May 23 - chartering of Bank of the City of Buenos Aires as the Monte de Piedad in a measure against the prevalence of usury in Buenos Aires (mostly targeting the growing wave of immigration in Argentina)

== Deaths ==
- January 8 – Gauchito Gil, legendary religious figure (b. 1847)
