= 1880 in Argentina =

- Decades: 1860s; 1870s; 1880s; 1890s; 1900s
- See also: Other events of 1880; List of years in Argentina

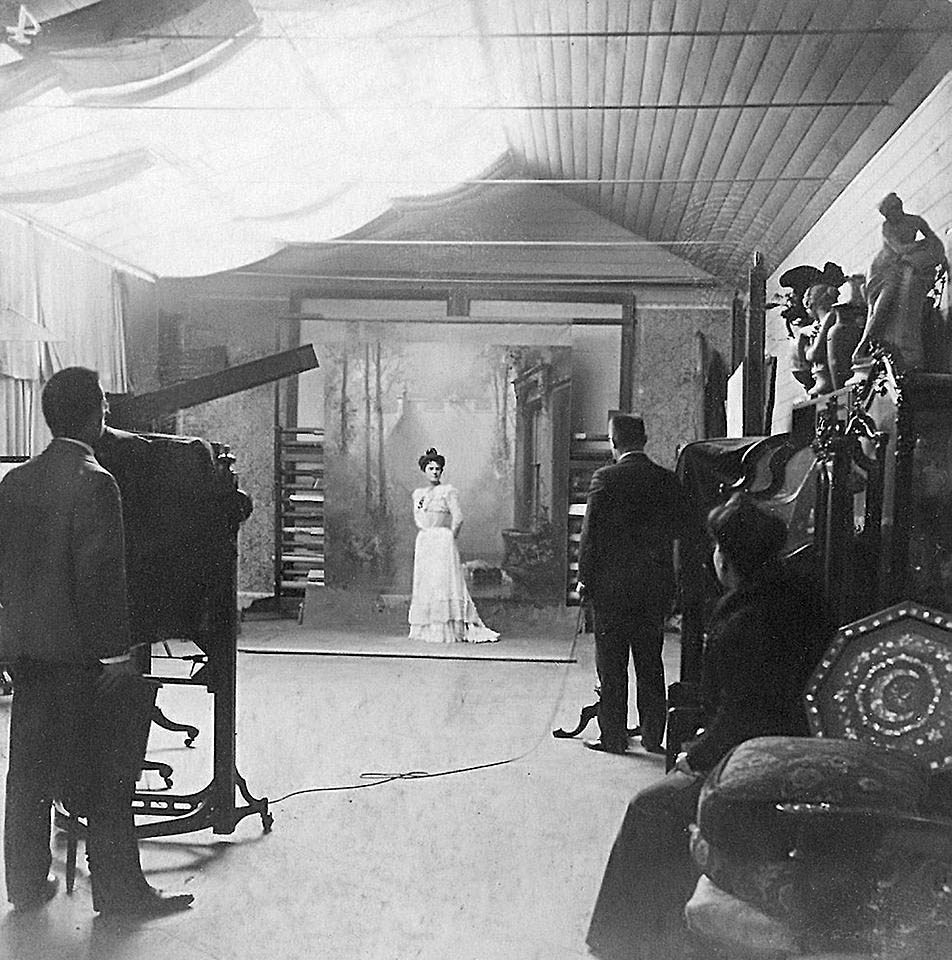
Photography studio in Buenos Aires in 1880

Events in the year 1880 in Argentina.

== Incumbents ==
- President: Nicolás Avellaneda (until 11 October); Julio Argentino Roca (from 12 October)

=== Governors ===
- Buenos Aires Province:
  - until 1 July: Carlos Tejedor
  - 1 July-18 July: José María Moreno
  - 18 July-11 October: José María Bustillo
  - starting 11 October: Juan José Romero
- Cordoba: Antonio Del Viso then Miguel Juárez Celman
- Mendoza Province: Elías Villanueva
- Santa Fe Province: Simón de Iriondo

=== Vice Governors ===
- Buenos Aires Province: José María Moreno (until 1 July); vacant thereafter (starting 1 July)

== Events ==
- 11 April – A presidential election results in the assumption of the presidency by General Julio Argentino Roca, who defeats the Governor of Buenos Aires Province, Carlos Tejedor. Thus the Generation of '80 begins its rule in Argentina. Under Roca's presidency, the so-called "laicist laws" (Leyes Laicas) are passed, which nationalizing functions that had previously been under the control of the Church.
- 21 June – Battle of Los Corrales: Troops of Carlos Tejedor, governor of Buenos Aires, are defeated by the National Army led by president Nicolás Avellaneda.
- 21 September – Federalization of Buenos Aires: President Avellaneda's law, Buenos Aires becomes the capital of the republic, under direct control of the federal government.
- 6 October – The ironclad ARA Almirante Brown is officially launched from a London shipyard.
- 12 October – Julio Argentino Roca begins his term as president.

== Births ==
- 7 January – Santiago Copello, Roman Catholic cardinal and Archbishop of Buenos Aires (died 1967)
- 3 April – Jorge Brown, footballer (died 1936)
- 15 July – Enrique Mosca, Radical lawyer and politician (died 1950)
- 10 August – Alfredo Palacios, Socialist politician (died 1965)

== Deaths ==
- 6 November – Estanislao del Campo, poet (born 1834)
- date unknown – Domingo Melín, Mapuche chief
