= 1879 in Argentina =

- Decades: 1850s; 1860s; 1870s; 1880s; 1890s
- See also: Other events of 1879; List of years in Argentina

Events in the year 1879 in Argentina.

== Incumbents ==
- President: Nicolás Avellaneda
- Vice President: Mariano Acosta

=== Governors ===
- Buenos Aires Province: Carlos Tejedor
- Cordoba: Antonio Del Viso
- Mendoza Province: Elías Villanueva
- Santa Fe Province: Simón de Iriondo

=== Vice Governors ===
- Buenos Aires Province: José María Moreno

== Events ==
- April – Conquest of the Desert: Julio Argentino Roca begins his second sweep of the land up to the Río Negro, aiming to "extinguish, subdue or expel" the Indians who inhabit the region.
- October – Roca gives up his military career to enter politics.
- 10 November – Tandanor, a worker-owned shipyard, is founded in Buenos Aires.
- date unknown
  - Argentina's first anarchist newspaper, El Descamisado, is launched.
- Aberdeen Angus cattle are first introduced to Argentina by Don Carlos Guerrero.

== Arts and culture ==
- date unknown
  - José Hernández publishes La Vuelta de Martín Fierro, the second and final part of his epic poem.
  - Eduardo Gutiérrez writes his major novel, Juan Moreira.

== Births ==
- 27 May – Cesáreo Bernaldo de Quirós, post-Impressionist painter (died 1968)
- 22 November – Julio Salvador Sagreras, guitarist and composer (died 1942)
- 6 December – Rogelio Yrurtia, Realist sculptor (died 1950)

== Deaths ==
- date unknown – Juan Madariaga, general (born 1809)
