= 1877 in Argentina =

- Decades: 1850s; 1860s; 1870s; 1880s; 1890s
- See also: Other events of 1877; List of years in Argentina

Events in the year 1877 in Argentina.

== Incumbents ==
- President: Nicolás Avellaneda
- Vice President: Mariano Acosta

=== Governors ===
- Buenos Aires Province: Carlos Casares
- Cordoba: Enrique Rodríguez then Antonio Del Viso
- Mendoza Province: Joaquín Villanueva (until 24 December); Julio Gutiérrez (from 24 December)
- Santa Fe Province: Servando Bayo

=== Vice Governors ===
- Buenos Aires Province: Luis Sáenz Peña

== Births ==
- February 21 - Enrique Mosconi, military engineer
- April 18 - Carlos Ibarguren

== Deaths ==
- December 29 - Adolfo Alsina
