= 1876 in Argentina =

- Decades: 1850s; 1860s; 1870s; 1880s; 1890s
- See also: Other events of 1876; List of years in Argentina

Events in the year 1876 in Argentina.

== Incumbents ==
- President: Nicolás Avellaneda
- Vice President: Mariano Acosta

=== Governors ===
- Buenos Aires Province: Carlos Casares
- Cordoba: Enrique Rodríguez
- Mendoza Province: Francisco Civit (until 16 October); Joaquín Villanueva (from 16 October)
- Santa Fe Province: Servando Bayo

=== Vice Governors ===
- Buenos Aires Province: Luis Sáenz Peña

== Births ==
- February 26 - Agustín Pedro Justo, president 1932-1938
- Date unknown
  - Pedro Sacaggio, engineer and inventor (d. 1959)
