= Battle of Los Corrales =

Coordinates: 34°38′S 58°24′W

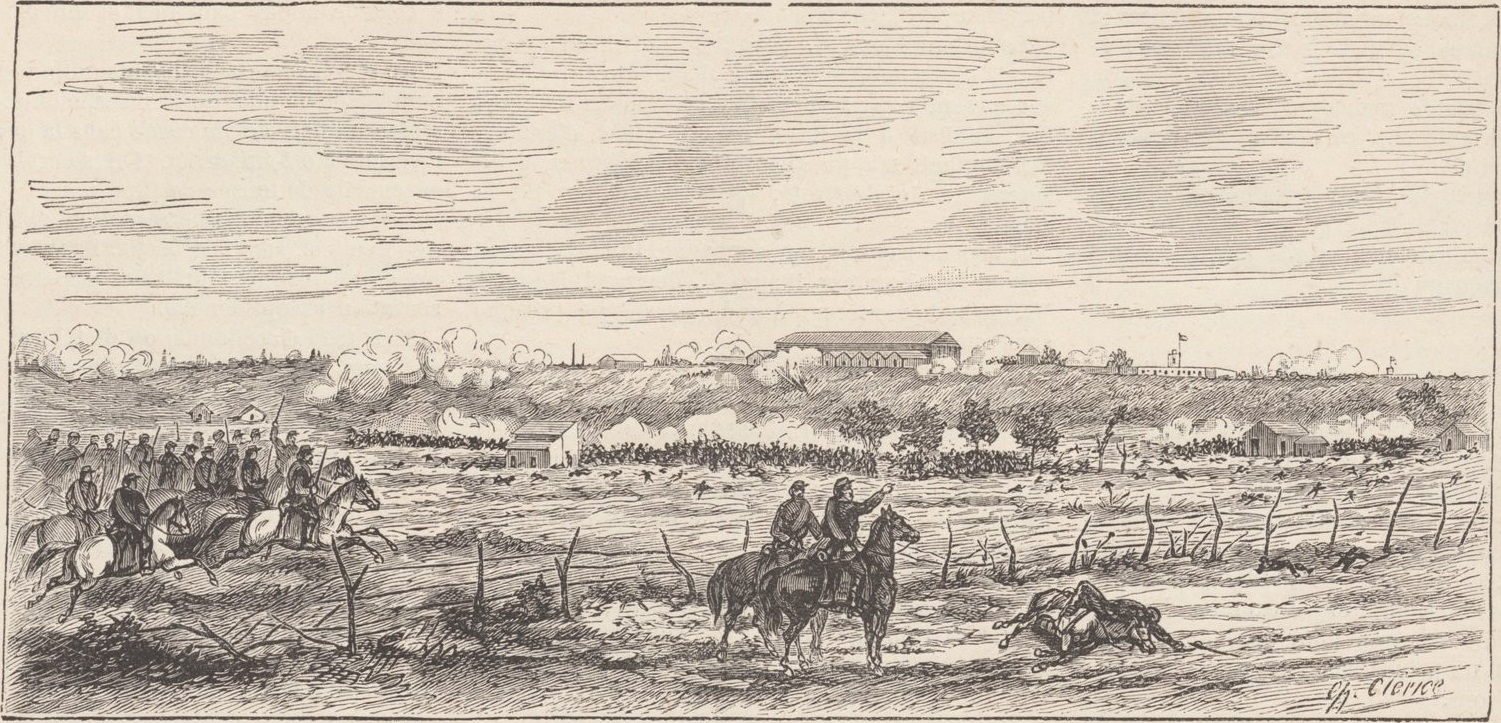
Battle of June 21: Attack by national troops, near Corrales (Mataderos), defended by the National Guard of Buenos Ayres.

The Battle of Los Corrales (Spanish: Batalla de los Corrales Viejos) was one of the final conflicts during the brief Argentinian Revolution of 1880. It took place in Parque Patricios, Buenos Aires, Argentina, on June 21, 1880, and confronted the side led by Carlos Tejedor, governor of Buenos Aires, against the National Army led by president Nicolás Avellaneda.
