= José Roca =

José Roca may refer to:

- José Segundo Roca (1800-1865), Argentine colonel
- José Roca y Ponsa (1852-1938), Spanish Roman Catholic priest
- José Antonio Roca (1928-2007), Mexican footballer
- José Manuel Roca (born 1976), Spanish footballer
