= Revolution of 1880 =

Uprising in Buenos Aires, Argentina

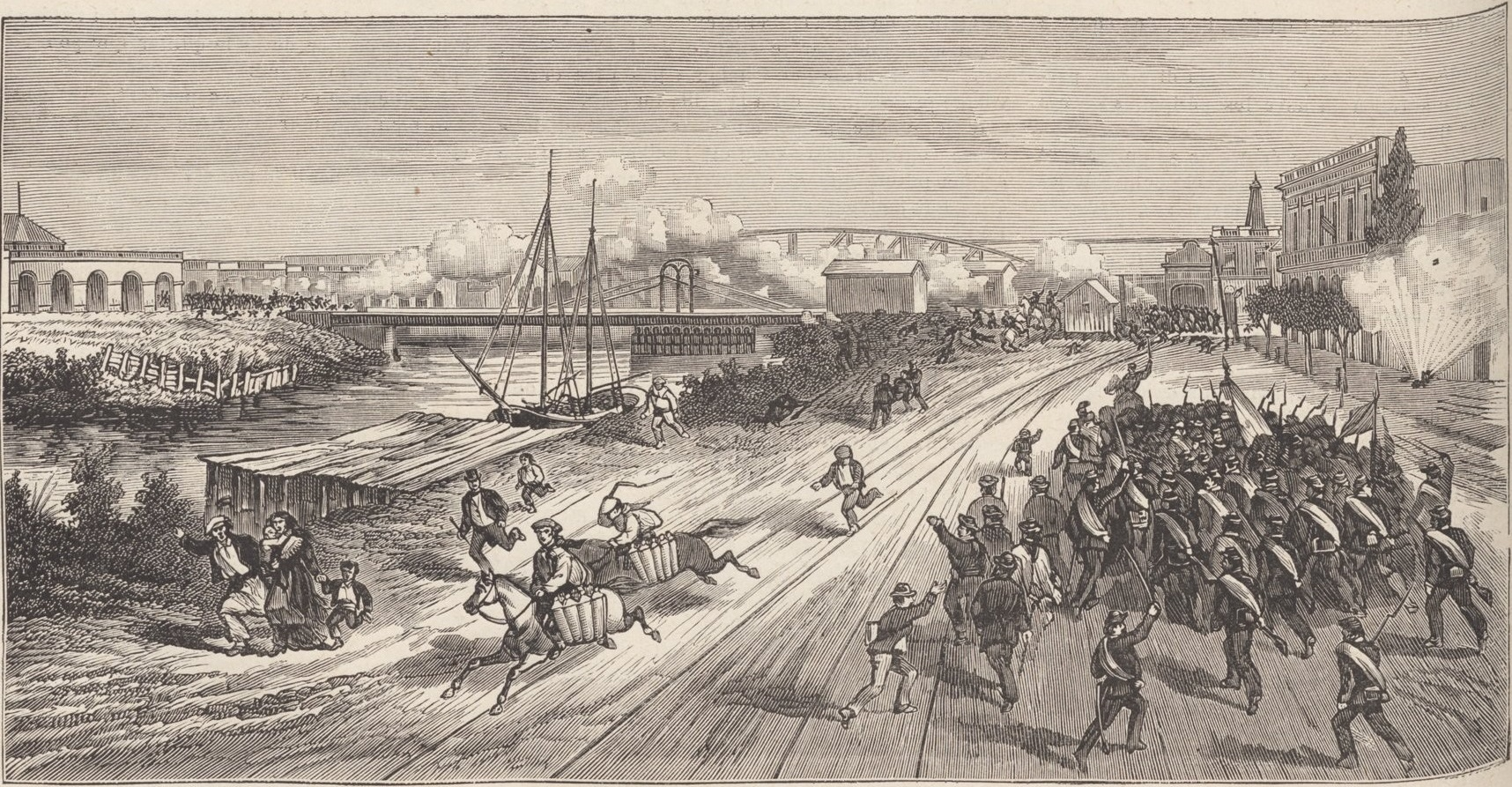
- Defense of the Barracas Bridge by the Buenos Aires National Guard
Date	June 1880
Location	Buenos Aires Province
Result	National Government victory: Federalization of Buenos Aires; End of the Argentine Civil Wars

Belligerents
Argentine Republic	Buenos Aires Province

Commanders and leaders
Nicolás Avellaneda; Joaquín Viejobueno; Mariano Cordero; Eduardo Racedo; Nicolás Levalle; Carlos Smith; Francisco Reynolds	Carlos Tejedor; Hilario Lagos; Edelmiro Mayer; Julio Campos; José Inocencio Arias; José Ignacio Garmendia; Tomás Elliot.

The Revolution of 1880 also known as The Revolution of Carlos Tejedor, and is considered as the last episode of the Argentine Civil Wars started originally in 1814. It was contested between the government of the Province of Buenos Aires and the National government chaired by Nicolás Avellaneda. The event took place in June 1880, ending June 23 after the Battle of Los Corrales.
