= Carlos Smith (Argentine officer) =

Argentine military officer (1845–1913)

General Carlos Smith
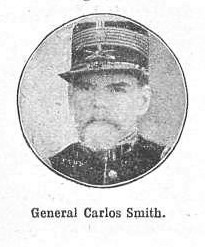

Jefe de Estado Mayor of the Ejército Argentino
- In office 1897–1906
- Preceded by: ?
- Succeeded by: ?

Personal details
- Born: Carlos Inocencio Smith; July 28, 1845 Buenos Aires, Argentina
- Died: February 19, 1913 (aged 67) Buenos Aires, Argentina
- Resting place: La Recoleta Cemetery
- Education: Colegio Militar de la Nación
- Occupation: Military man
- Profession: Army

Military service
- Allegiance: Argentina
- Branch/service: Argentine Army
- Years of service: 1861-1907
- Rank: General
- Commands: Regimiento 1° de Infantería de Línea
- Battles/wars: Paraguayan War; Conquest of the Desert; Revolution of 1880; Revolution of the Park; Revolution of 1893; Revolution of 1905

Carlos Smith (1845–1913) was an Argentine military man who served as Chief of the Army General Staff of the Argentine Republic. He took part in various military conflicts, including his active participation against the civil uprisings in the Argentine Revolution of 1893.

He was born in San Martín, Buenos Aires, the son of Francisco Smith and Clara Gabiola, belonging to a family of English and Creole roots. He was married to Juliana Legesen, born in Entre Ríos, daughter of Bernardo Legesen and Sinforosa de los Santos.
