= José Segundo Roca =

Argentinian military personnel

Coronel José Segundo Roca
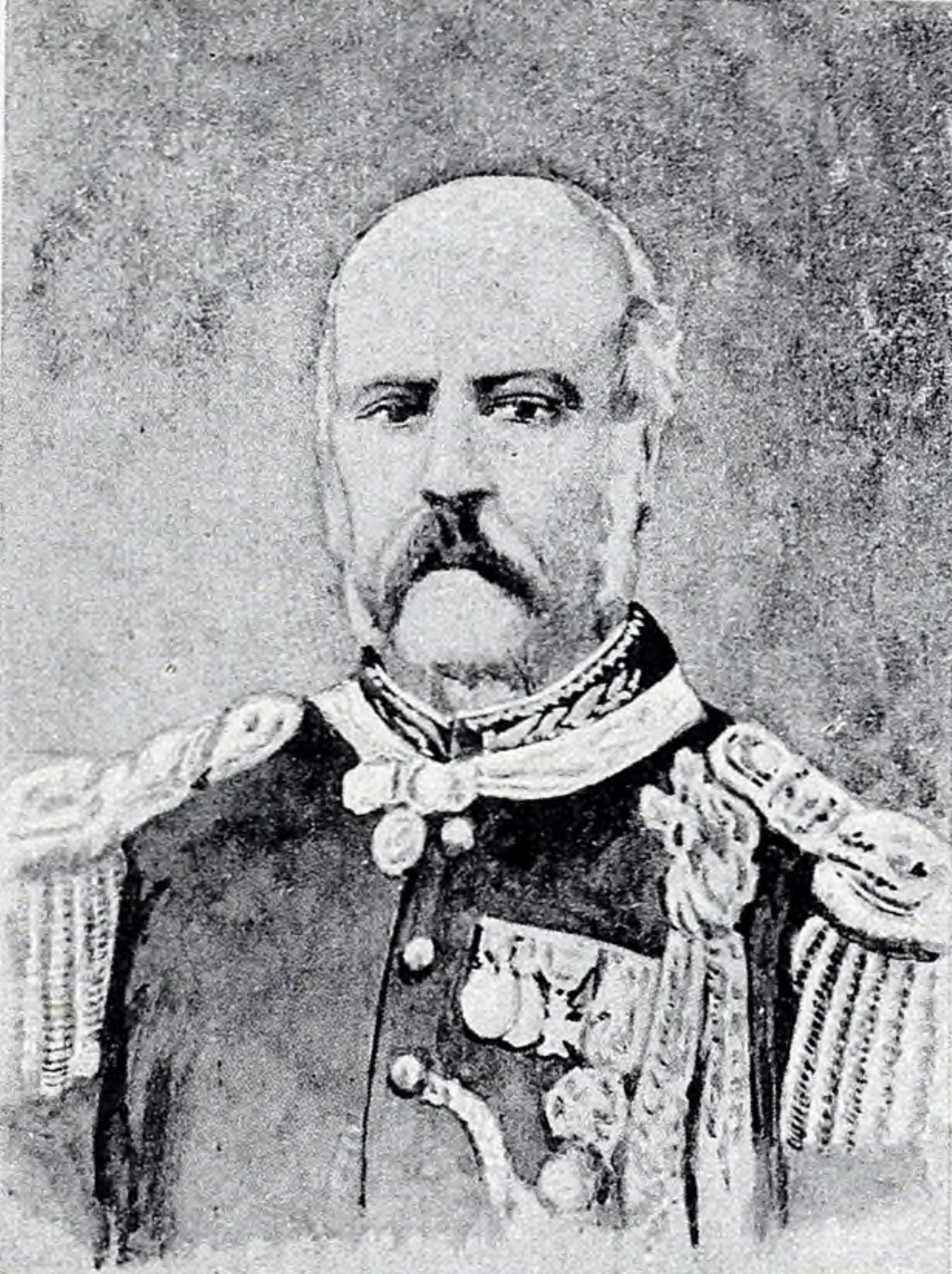

Personal details
- Born: Joseph Segundo Roca y Tejerina; 1800 San Miguel de Tucumán, Argentina
- Died: 1866 (aged 65–66) Corrientes, Argentina
- Resting place: La Recoleta Cemetery
- Spouse: Agustina Paz de Roca
- Children: Alejandro Segundo Roca; Ataliva Roca; Julio Argentino Roca; Celedonio Roca; Fermín Agustín Roca; Alejo Agustín Roca; Marcos Roca; Rudecindo Roca; Marcelina Francisca Roca
- Occupation: army
- Profession: military man
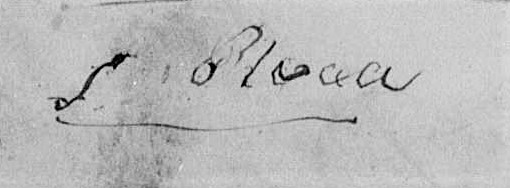
- Signature

Military service
- Allegiance: (Argentina) United Provinces of the River Plate (1816–1828); Ejército Unitario (1829-1842); Argentine Confederation (1852-1861); Argentine Republic (1861-1866)
- Branch/service: Argentine Army
- Years of service: 1816-1866
- Rank: Colonel
- Battles/wars: Battle of Cerro de Pasco; Battle of Jauja; Battle of Pichincha; Battle of Zepita; Battle of Junín; Battle of Ombú; Battle of Ituzaingó; Battle of Camacuá; Battle of Las Palmitas; Battle of Márquez Bridge; Battle of La Ciudadela; Battle of Pavón

José Segundo Roca (July 1, 1800 – March 8, 1866) was an Argentine colonel. He took part in the second Upper Peru campaign, and died during the War of the Triple Alliance.

He was born in Tucumán, the son of Pedro Roca, born in Tarragona, and María Antonia Tejerina, a Creole from Tucumán. He was married to Josefa Agustina Paz, daughter of Juan Bautista de Paz and María Plácida Pereyra, belonging to a distinguished family. He and his wife were the parents of numerous children, including General Julio Argentino Roca, who was twice President of Argentina.
