= Carlos Casares (governor) =

Argentine rancher, executive and politician

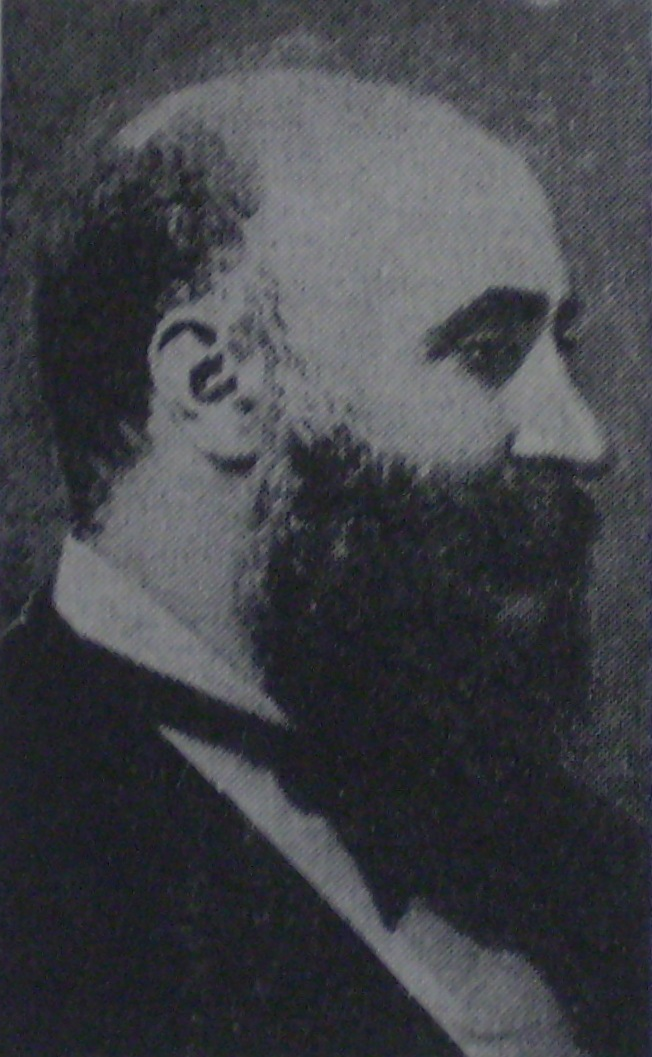

Governor of Buenos Aires
- In office May 1, 1878 – May 1, 1880
- Preceded by: Álvaro Barros
- Succeeded by: Carlos Tejedor

Personal details
- Born: February 13, 1830 Buenos Aires
- Died: May 2, 1883 (aged 53) Magdalena, Buenos Aires
- Spouse: María Josefa Martínez de Hoz
- Occupation: Rancher

Carlos Casares (February 13, 1830 – May 2, 1883) was an Argentine rancher, executive, and politician.

== Life and times ==
Carlos Gumersindo Casares was born to Gervasia Rodríguez Rojo and Vicente Casares, in 1830. His father, born in Vizcaya, Spain, served as the first Spanish Consul to Argentina. His parents became influential ranchers in Argentina, and he studied in Germany.

Casares became a vocal opponent of Buenos Aires Province Governor Juan Manuel de Rosas, and he was jailed for a time. Following the strongman's fall at the 1852 Battle of Caseros, he entered politics, and in 1857, was elected to the Provincial Legislature. He bred racehorses in subsequent years, and became a member of the board of the Buenos Aires Western Railway. He married María Josefa Martínez de Hoz, the daughter of prominent landowners, and had one son.

He affiliated himself with Adolfo Alsina's Buenos Aires-centric Autonomist Party, and in 1875, the party's standard-bearer, President Nicolás Avellaneda, appointed Casares Governor of Buenos Aires; the appointment of Casares, a moderate, contributed to an improvement in relations with provincial Caudillos from the hinterland, and fomented national unity.

Casares enacted the Law of Common Education, a precursor to the Argentine Law 1420 of 1884, which mandated universal, compulsory, free and secular education. He stepped down in 1878 upon the election of separatist Carlos Tejedor. Amid resurfacing tensions, Casares headed the Autonomist Party committee that nominated General Julio Roca ahead of the 1880 presidential election.

Casares was appointed Director of the Bank of the Province of Buenos Aires in 1882, and died at his Magdalena ranch in 1883.
