= Julio Argentino Roca =

4th and 9th President of Argentina

General Julio Argentino Roca
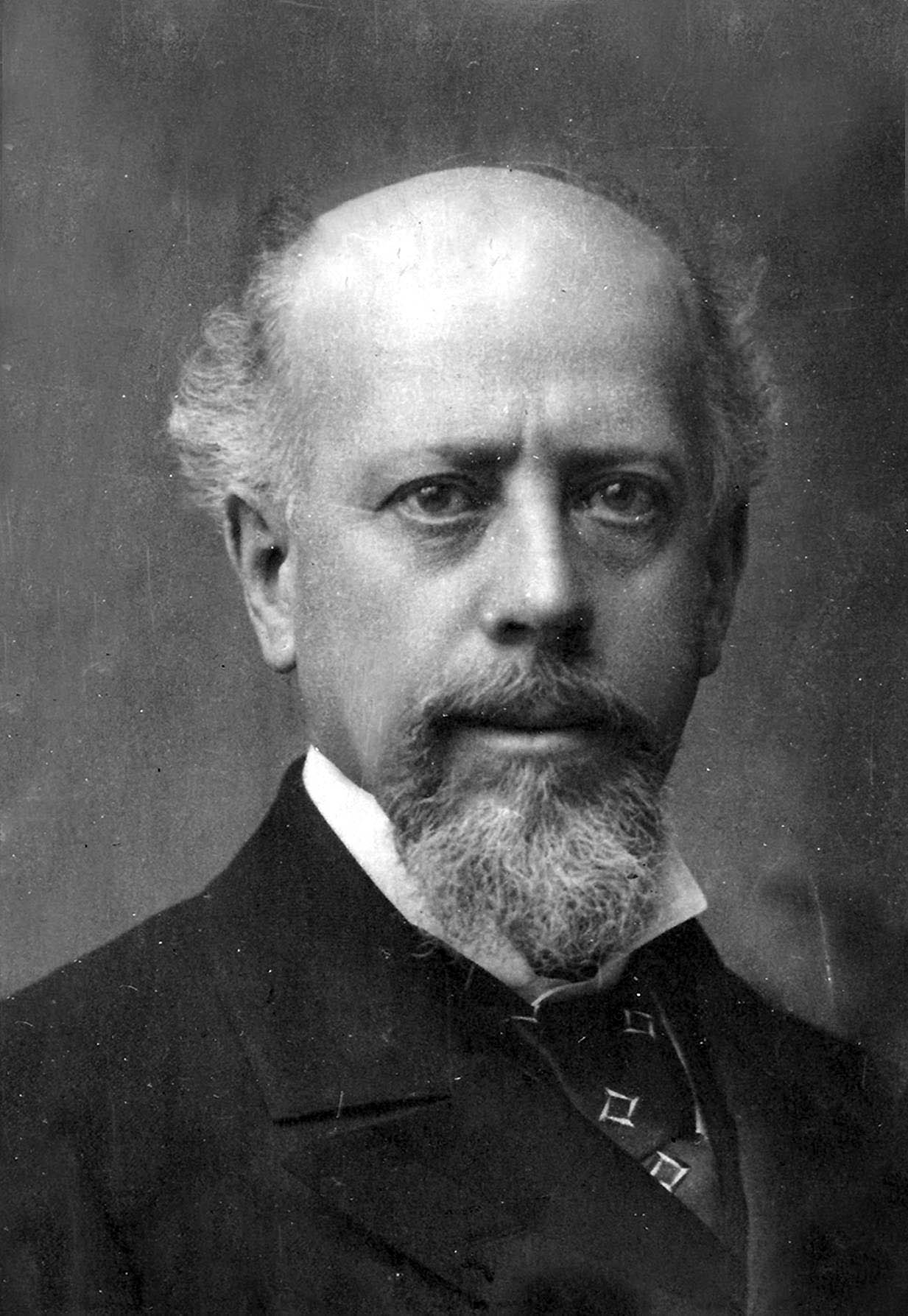

9th & 14th President of Argentina
- In office October 12, 1898 – October 11, 1904
- Vice President: Norberto Quirno Costa
- Preceded by: José E. Uriburu
- Succeeded by: Manuel Quintana
- In office October 12, 1880 – October 11, 1886
- Vice President: Francisco Bernabé Madero
- Preceded by: Nicolás Avellaneda
- Succeeded by: Miguel Ángel Juárez Celman

Minister of the Interior
- In office August 6, 1890 – May 1, 1891
- President: Carlos Pellegrini
- Preceded by: Salustiano Zavalía
- Succeeded by: José Vicente Zapata

Minister of War and the Navy
- In office January 4, 1878 – October 9, 1879
- President: Nicolás Avellaneda
- Preceded by: Adolfo Alsina
- Succeeded by: Carlos Pellegrini

Personal details
- Born: July 17, 1843 San Miguel de Tucumán, Argentina
- Died: October 19, 1914 (aged 71) Buenos Aires, Argentina
- Resting place: La Recoleta Cemetery
- Party: National Autonomist
- Spouse: Clara Funes
- Children: Julio Pascual Roca; Alejandro Roca; Elisa Roca; María Marcela Roca; Clara Roca; Agustina Roca; Josefina Roca; Elena Roca
- Parent(s): José Segundo Roca; Agustina Paz
- Relatives: Marcos Paz (uncle)

Military service
- Allegiance: Argentine Confederation (until 1861); Argentine Republic
- Branch/service: Argentine Army
- Years of service: 1856–1880
- Rank: Lieutenant General
- Battles/wars: Battle of Cepeda; Battle of Pavón; Battle of Lomas Blancas; Battle of Las Playas; Siege of Uruguaiana; Battle of Yatay; Battle of Tuyutí; Battle of Curupayty; Battle of San Ignacio; Battle of Pastos Grandes; Battle of Ñaembé; Battle of Santa Rosa

Alejo Julio Argentino Roca Paz (July 17, 1843 – October 19, 1914) was an Argentine army general and statesman who served as President of Argentina from 1880 to 1886 and from 1898 to 1904. Roca is the most important representative of the Generation of '80 and is known for directing the Conquest of the Desert, a series of military campaigns against the indigenous peoples of Patagonia sometimes considered a genocide.

During his two terms as president, many important changes occurred, particularly major infrastructure projects of railroads and port facilities; increased foreign investment, along with immigration from Europe and particular large-scale immigration from southern Europe; expansion of the agricultural and pastoral sectors of the economy; and laicizing legislation strengthening state power.

Roca's main foreign policy concern was to set border limits with Chile, which had never been determined with precision. In 1881 Argentina gained territory by treaty with Chile.

== Upbringing and early career ==
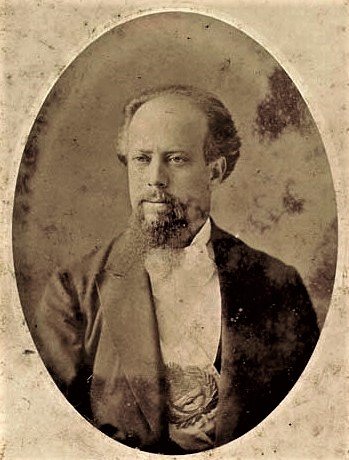
Roca in his youth

Roca was born in the northwestern city of San Miguel de Tucumán in 1843 into a prominent local family. He graduated from the National College in Concepción del Uruguay, Entre Ríos. Before he was 15, Roca joined the army of the Argentine Confederation, on 19 March 1858. While still an adolescent, he went to fight as a junior artillery officer in the struggle between Buenos Aires and the interior provinces, first on the side of the provinces and later on behalf of the capital. He also fought in the War of the Triple Alliance against Paraguay between 1865 and 1870. Roca rose to the rank of colonel serving in the war to suppress the revolt of Ricardo López Jordán in Entre Ríos. President Nicolás Avellaneda later promoted him to General after his victory over rebel general José M. Arredondo in the battle of Santa Rosa, leading the loyalist forces. Roca saw the army "as an agent of national unification," and his experience in the army "broadened his understanding of Argentina and the provincial upper class."

== Military career ==
He took part in the Paraguayan War against Paraguay, being appointed commander of the National Guards regiment of Salta Province in 1865. In that war, his father and two of his brothers died. He returned to his country before the end of the war; in late 1868 he was sent to the Puna to repel the last attempted uprising of the caudillo Felipe Varela, who was defeated by one of his subordinates.

Under the orders of Corrientes governor Santiago Baibiene, he fought the Federalist rebellion of Ricardo López Jordán in 1871, and his participation was crucial in the Battle of Ñaembé, which determined the defeat of the federal caudillo. During the revolution of 1874, he evaded the forces of the rebel general José Miguel Arredondo—who was politically aligned with Bartolomé Mitre—since he did not have sufficient forces to prevent him from occupying the city of Córdoba. But Arredondo moved on to Mendoza Province, where he defeated the local militias and waited for Roca, who had managed to gather a large number of soldiers. Instead of attacking Arredondo's fortified position head-on, he silently surrounded it during the night and attacked at dawn, easily defeating him in the Second Battle of Santa Rosa. Days later, fearing that the defeated general would be executed, he helped him flee to Chile.

In 1872 he married Clara Funes of Córdoba, with whom he had seven children. Clara Funes was the sister-in-law of politician Miguel Juárez Celman, who would become president of the nation through Roca's influence, and their first son was Julio Argentino Pascual Roca, who would become vice president of the nation. He had also had an extramarital daughter. From 1873 he was commander of the southern frontier of Córdoba Province, with the mission of stopping the periodic attacks of the Ranqueles indigenous people.

Most of his promotions in the military hierarchy were for wartime merit: hours after the Battle of Pavón he was promoted to first lieutenant; on 17 February 1864 he was promoted to captain, in peacetime. During the Paraguayan War he was promoted to sergeant major on 7 December 1866 for his heroic conduct in the Battle of Curupayty, and on 9 November 1868, at the end of the Pikysyry campaign, he was promoted to the rank of lieutenant colonel. On 26 January 1871 he was promoted to colonel for his key participation in the Battle of Ñaembé against López Jordán, and on 7 December 1874 he was promoted to the rank of coronel mayor, equivalent to brigadier general, for his victory in Mendoza against the revolutionaries under Arredondo; General Roca was 31 years old.

On 28 September 1880 he was promoted to brigadier general in recognition of the organization and command of the Conquest of the Desert. The subsequent promotions law of 1882 granted him the rank of lieutenant general.

== Political beginnings ==
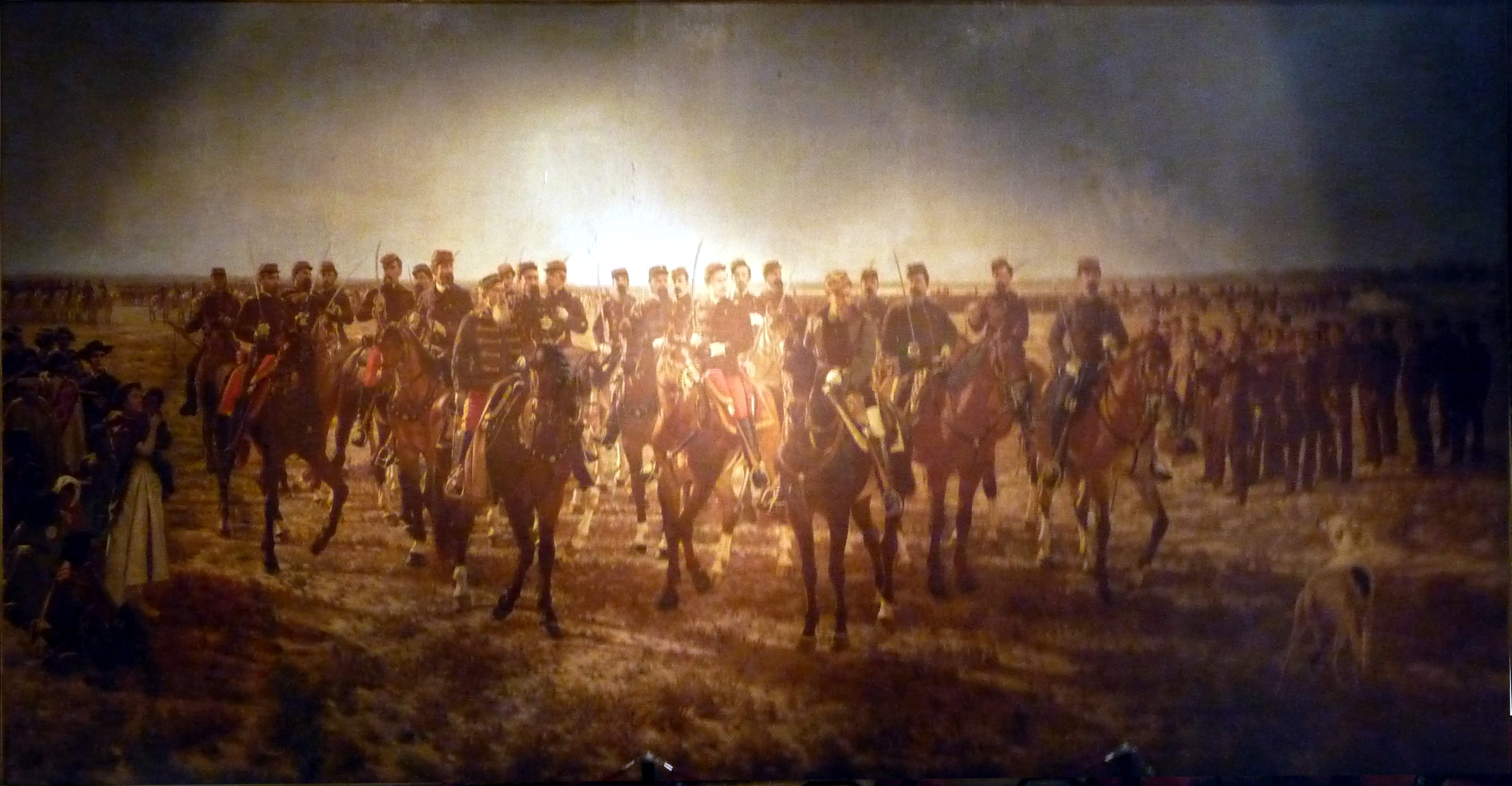
Military occupation in Rio Negro territory, painting by Juan Manuel Blanes, 1889

In 1878, during Nicolás Avellaneda's presidency, he became Minister of War and it was his task to prepare a campaign that would bring an end to the "frontier problem" after the failure of the plan of Adolfo Alsina (his predecessor). A number of indigenous groups defended their traditional territories and frequently assaulted non-indigenous frontier settlements, taking horses and cattle, and capturing women and children, who were enslaved or offered as brides to the warriors. Roca's approach to dealing with the Indian communities of the Pampas, however, was completely different from Alsina's, who had ordered the construction of a ditch and a defensive line of small fortresses across the Province of Buenos Aires. Roca saw no way to end native attacks (malones) but by putting under effective government control all land up to the Río Negro in a campaign (known as the Conquest of the Desert) that would "extinguish, subdue or expel" the Indians who lived there. "He began the campaign against the Ranqueles", which eventually resulted in the "transfer of 35% of national territory from the Indians to local caudillos. This land conquest would also strengthen Argentina's strategic position against Chile.

He devised a "tentacle" move, with waves of 6,000 men cavalry units stemming coordinately from Mendoza, Córdoba, Santa Fé and Buenos Aires in July 1878 and April 1879 respectively, with an official toll of nearly 1,313 Native Americans killed and 15,000 taken as prisoners, and is credited with the liberation of several hundred European hostages.

== First presidency (1880–1886) ==
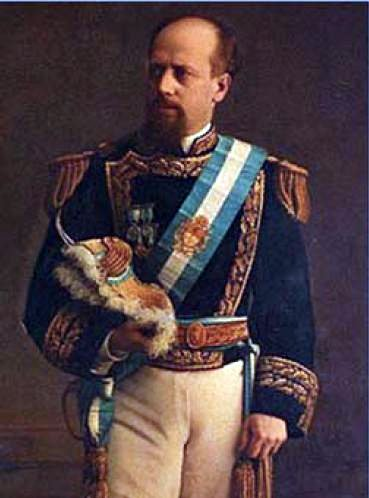
Roca with the presidential band in his first term (1880–86)

In mid-1879, after the death of Alsina, Roca became the most prestigious leader of the National Autonomous Party, and was proposed as a candidate by Cordoba's governor Miguel Celman, and in Buenos Aires by the doctor Eduardo Wilde; and he quickly gained the support of most of the Argentine provincial governors. The April 11 elections for president, which came a sweeping victory for the voters of Roca, except in Buenos Aires and Corrientes. On June 13 the Electoral College met and elected President General Roca and Vice President Francisco Bernabé Madero.

But in Buenos Aires a revolution against the triumph of Roca was brewing. Four days later the fighting began, which ended on June 25 with an agreement between the province and the nation; the Revolution of 1880 had cost 3,000 deaths.

Shortly before the presidential inauguration Roca was passed in Congress federalization of Buenos Aires.

The political system that had brought him to the presidency, and which maintained notable stability long after he left office, rested on a series of unstable agreements between provincial governors—who controlled elections through electoral fraud and clientelism—and the president, who controlled the national budget in favor of or against the provinces and could depose hostile governors through federal interventions. Mutually dependent, the governors and the president carried out continuous agreements that allowed both sides to advance the policies they desired. In any case, the stability of such a system required—in practice—the absence of any opposition; the fraudulent political practices also aimed at achieving that objective.

During his administration, the Penal Code and the national Mining Code were enacted; the municipal government of the new Federal Capital was organized, and the city of La Plata—capital of Buenos Aires Province—was founded.

The country's health situation had not improved significantly since the epidemic of yellow fever in 1871: between 1884 and 1887, a series of cholera epidemics caused hundreds of deaths in the capital and the interior.

Under his mandate the so-called "laicist laws" (Leyes Laicas) were passed, which nationalized a series of functions that previously were under the control of the Church. He also created the so-called Registro Civil, an index of all births, deaths and marriages. President Roca also made primary education free of charge by nationalizing education institutions run by the Church. This led to a break in relations with the Vatican. Roca presided over an era of rapid economic development fueled by large scale European immigration, railway construction, and booming agricultural exports. In May 1886 Roca was the subject of a failed assassination attempt.

=== Economy ===
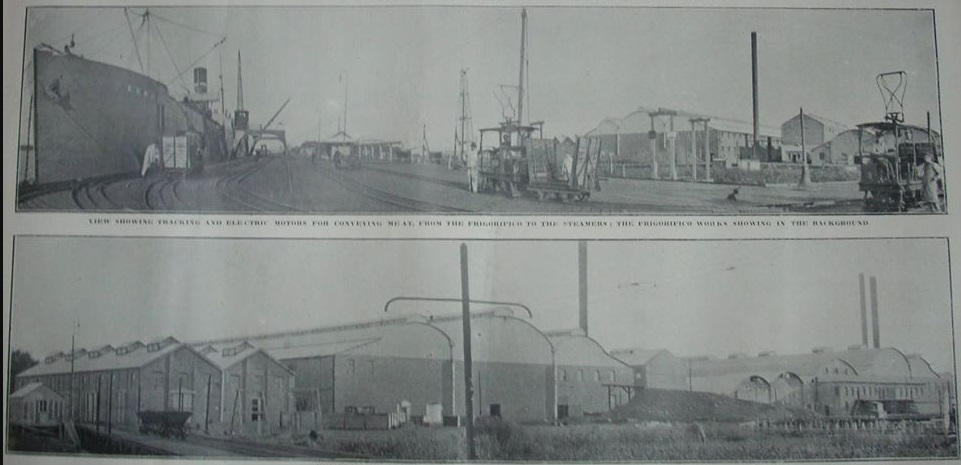
The River Plate Fresh Meat Company refrigeration plant in Campana. The first refrigeration plant installed in South America, in 1883. During Roca's presidency, the first refrigeration plants were established, enabling the export of meat to Europe.

Roca began his first term (1880–1886) in a favorable economic situation, as that year much of the world began to overcome the global depression that had begun in 1873. This period would be characterized by the introduction in 1883 of the refrigeration plant (frigorífico), an invention developed shortly before, as one of the central pillars of the Argentine economy. The refrigeration plant led landowners in Buenos Aires Province to adopt a mixed production model on their estates, combining agriculture and livestock raising, a model that gave Argentina the label of an "agro-livestock" economy. However, it took more than two decades for Argentine cattle to be adapted to the British market, and until the end of the century there remained a high production of tasajo (intended for consumption by enslaved people and populations in servile conditions), produced by saladeros.

The economic system was sustained through the exchange of primary products—exclusively of agricultural and livestock origin, and largely produced in the Pampas region—for manufactured goods from abroad, especially from Europe.

==== Public works ====
Roca's first government stood out for the large amount of public works carried out, financed with a high fiscal deficit.

The railway network expanded from 2,516 to 6,161 km during his administration. A very significant portion of resources was also allocated to the construction of important buildings, mainly in Buenos Aires and in the new capital of Buenos Aires Province, La Plata. A policy of credit to private individuals was initiated, of which an alarming proportion ended up in the hands of speculators and even chronic debtors, who would never repay them.

During his first term (1880–1886), he issued a decree in 1882 for the construction of the Port of Ensenada in Buenos Aires Province, shortly after declaring La Plata as its capital. Also in 1882, the Congress approved the project to build a new Port of Buenos Aires (Puerto Madero and Dock Sud), following the design of Eduardo Madero. The law was immediately promulgated by Roca, but the contract for its construction was signed in 1884 and the works only began in 1886, when Roca finished his presidential term.

==== Monetary policy and the "period of great indebtedness" ====
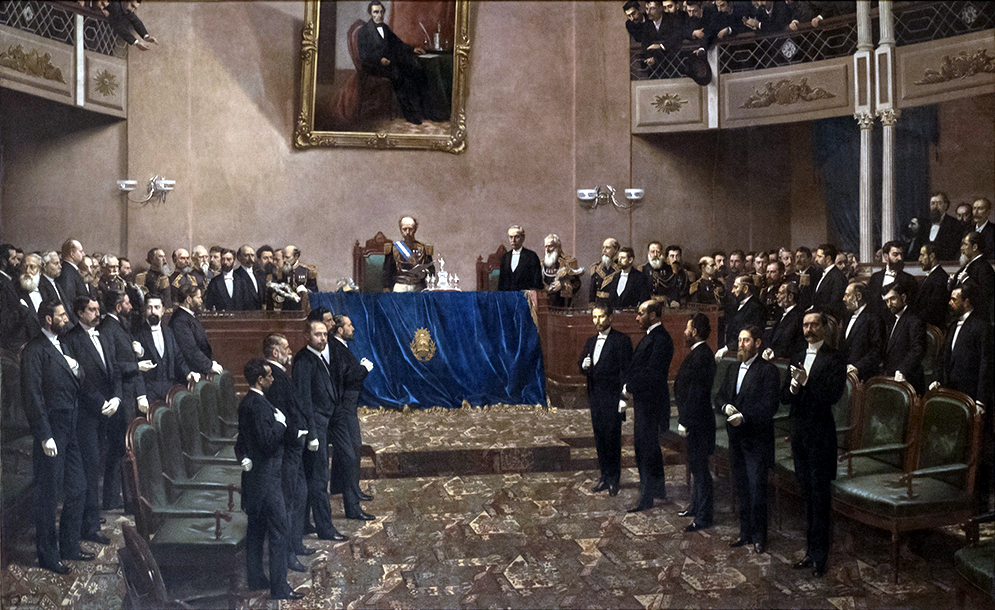
President Roca inaugurating the 1886 legislative session.

Roca created the Argentine national currency as such, while also adopting a policy of high borrowing and fiscal deficit that greatly increased the external debt, a policy continued by his brother-in-law and successor Miguel Juárez Celman. A crisis erupted in 1888, when the country entered into default for four years. The national state practically lacked its own currency, to which Roca’s government responded by creating the peso moneda nacional (symbol: m$n), or "gold peso", because its parity with gold was guaranteed—although this parity could only be maintained for 17 months.

Law No. 1130 on National Currency, enacted in 1881, unified the Argentine monetary system and allowed the issuance of currency by five banks: Banco Nacional, Banco de la Provincia de Buenos Aires, Banco de Córdoba, Banco de Santa Fe, and Banco Otero. The new currency began to circulate in July 1883.

In 1884 a crisis erupted that forced Roca to abandon the gold peso he had created the previous year, decreeing the forced circulation of paper money and contracting a new foreign loan.

Already in 1884, European lenders—concerned by the unprecedented frequency with which Argentina appeared on the loan market—began to worry.

— Pablo Gerchunoff and Lucas Llach.

Despite these warning signs, the high fiscal deficit and the country's growing debt, the Argentine peso remained about 40% above gold, prompting international markets to buy large quantities of Argentine bonds in an operation unprecedented worldwide. The continuation of economic prosperity and the growth of agricultural production—stimulated by that same boom—allowed Roca to complete his term while maintaining his "bold" policy of fiscal deficit, investment, and borrowing without major disturbances.

=== Educational and cultural policy ===
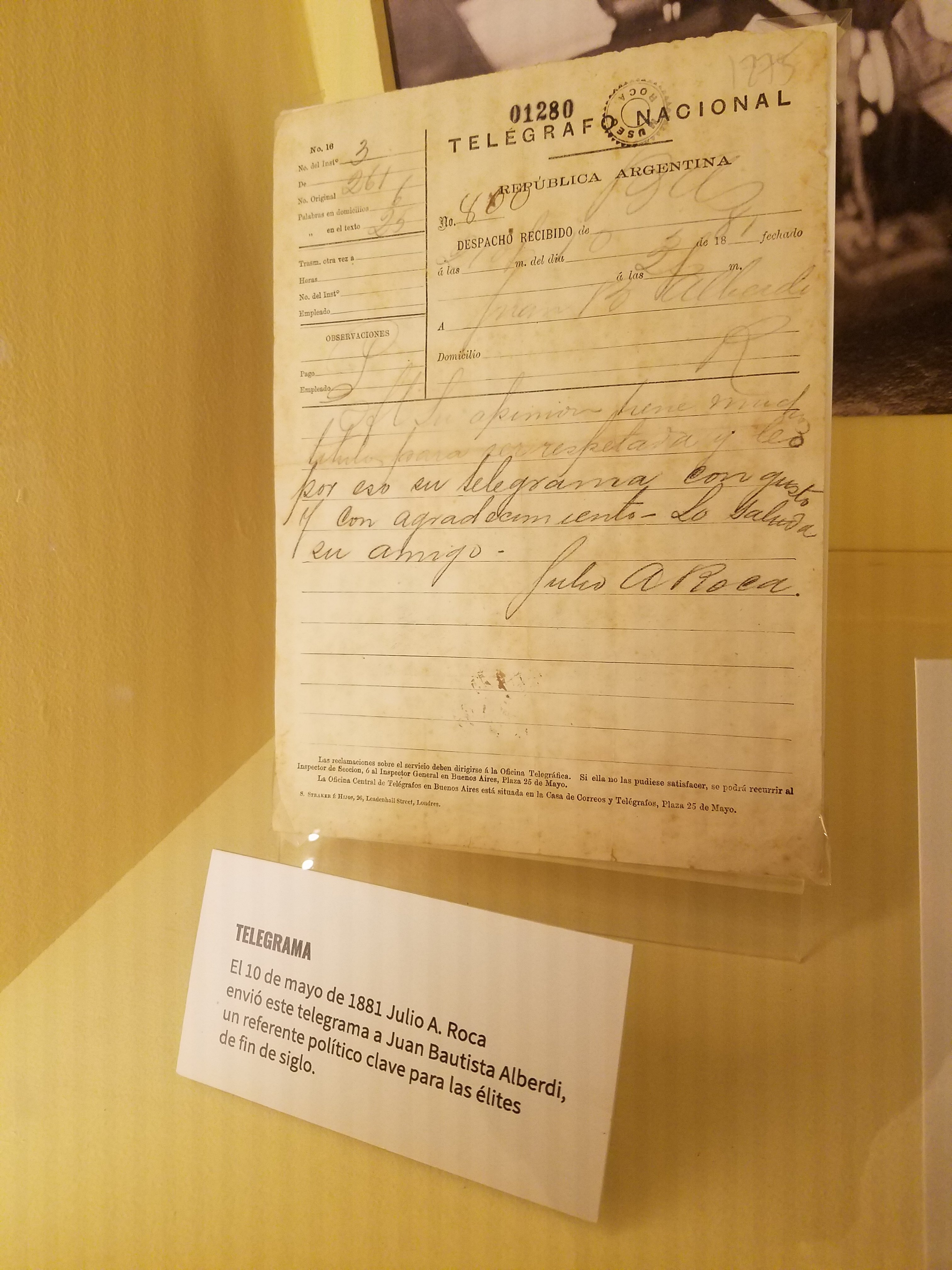
On 10 May 1881, Roca sent this telegram to Juan B. Alberdi, who was in France.

Inspired by secularism, President Roca and his government sought to separate the Catholic Church from the state. A law establishing the civil registry was enacted and, following the First National Pedagogical Congress, the government promoted the Law 1420 on Education. The initiative was promoted by former president Domingo Faustino Sarmiento, then director of the National Council of Education, who considered education the principal democratizing tool of a society. The law established compulsory, free, and secular primary education. Prior to the enactment of the law, the first national educational census (National School Census) was carried out in 1883, providing accurate data on the school-age population, literacy rates, and the condition of existing educational institutions. This census informed the development of subsequent national educational policies.

Under this law, major progress was made in literacy: when Roca took office there were 1,214 public schools in the country, and he left 1,804 to his successor. Normal schools for teacher training increased from 10 to 17; the number of teachers rose from 1,915 to 5,348; and total enrollment grew from 86,927 to 180,768 students.

The apostolic internuncio, Monsignor Luigi Matera, strongly attacked the education law because it prohibited public schools from providing religious instruction, even making veiled calls for civil disobedience. In response, by order of President Roca, Minister Francisco J. Ortiz returned the nuncio’s credentials and ordered his immediate departure from the country; diplomatic relations with the Holy See remained suspended for several years. In response, a Catholic political grouping led by José Manuel Estrada was formed to challenge what it considered the liberal and anticlerical dominance of the governing group, which it believed attacked the traditional religion.

On 25 June 1885 the law Estatutos de las Universidades Nacionales was promulgated, also known as the Avellaneda Law. Drafted by Nicolás Avellaneda, the law granted universities autonomy in several matters and established a framework for their governance, including the election of the rector through a university assembly and the voting of professors for vacant chairs, although the final appointment remained with the executive power. It also allowed faculties to design their own study plans. Another important provision was the creation of an independent university fund derived from university fees.

=== Expansion of Argentine territory: national territories ===
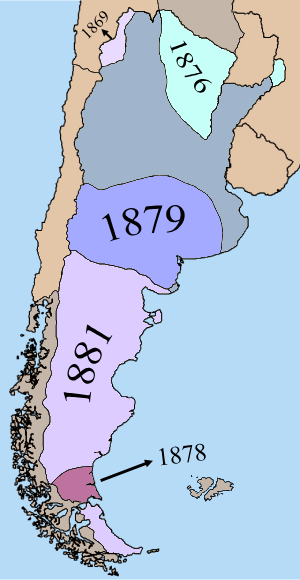
In grey, the territory of Argentina before Roca's presidency.

After the main phase of the so-called Conquest of the Desert (Conquista del Desierto; Puel Mapu according to Indigenous peoples) (1878–1879), which he himself had commanded in the field, Roca decided to end the remaining Indigenous resistance by ordering the Neuquén and Río Negro campaign (1880–1881), the Andes campaign (1882–1883), and the final campaigns (1883–1885). Through these military campaigns, the Argentine Republic completed the occupation of what are now the provinces of Neuquén and Chubut, and the southern part of Río Negro.

To the north, Roca continued the conquest of the Chaco, which had been initiated by President Domingo Faustino Sarmiento in 1870. The most important campaign was commanded by the minister of war Benjamín Victorica in 1884, defeating major Qom leaders such as Yaloshi (who was executed and decapitated, his head used symbolically at the founding of a settlement named after the president), Cambá, and the Mocoví leader Juan el Raí.

In 1884, Law No. 1532 on National Territories was enacted, establishing the national territories of Misiones, Formosa, and Chaco in the north, and La Pampa, Neuquén, Río Negro, Chubut, Santa Cruz, and Tierra del Fuego in the south. The inhabitants of the national territories lacked political rights until they were provincialized more than six decades later during the government of Juan Domingo Perón.

In the new territories there were continuous property conflicts between owners who had purchased titles in Buenos Aires and settlers already established in the area. The situation of Indigenous peoples was much worse, as they were forcibly gathered into reductions located on marginal lands which, in many cases, were periodically relocated.

The only exception was the Welsh colony of Chubut, organized socially and culturally apart from Argentine society since 1865, though carefully controlled by the authorities. From 1884 it even had its own railway.

=== Foreign policy ===
To fix the boundaries with Chile, which had never been determined with sufficient precision, the Boundary Treaty with Chile was signed in Buenos Aires in 1881. It established that "the boundary line shall run in that extent along the highest summits of the said Cordillera that divide the waters, and shall pass between the slopes that descend on one side and the other..." up to the 52nd parallel south. From that point, it was determined that the Strait of Magellan would be entirely Chilean; that a portion of the Isla Grande de Tierra del Fuego would belong to Argentina; that the islands south of the Beagle Channel up to Cape Horn would belong to Chile; while the Isla de los Estados and the other islands located in the Atlantic east of Tierra del Fuego and the eastern coasts of Patagonia would belong to the Argentine Republic.

Although the treaty represented clear progress, several issues remained unresolved, particularly the delimitation of boundaries in the extensive areas where the "highest summits" did not coincide with the drainage divide.

An expedition led by Augusto Lasserre visited Tierra del Fuego in October 1883. On that occasion he purchased from the British missionary Thomas Bridges his facilities on the Beagle Channel, marking the founding of the city of Ushuaia. Argentina also sought to secure possession of the richest valleys of the Patagonian Andes; the governor of the National Territory of Chubut, Luis Jorge Fontana, occupied the Valle 16 de Octubre, where he founded the town of Trevelin together with Welsh settlers in October 1885.

Relations with the United Kingdom, which remained excellent throughout his presidency, encouraged Roca to renew Argentine claims to sovereignty over the Falkland Islands. These claims had originally been raised during the time of Juan Manuel de Rosas but had not been formally reiterated by any government during the period of National Organization. By order of President Roca, Minister Ortiz informed the British representative in Buenos Aires that his government intended to resort to international arbitration to resolve the issue. Despite the fact that such mechanisms had been encouraged by Britain in various conflicts between South American nations, the proposal was firmly rejected.

At the end of his term, support given by his government to the Uruguayan military leader José Miguel Arredondo during the Revolución del Quebracho generated a brief diplomatic incident with Uruguay. The conflict was resolved through a promise—never fulfilled—to punish those responsible for the assistance.

== Continuing political involvement ==
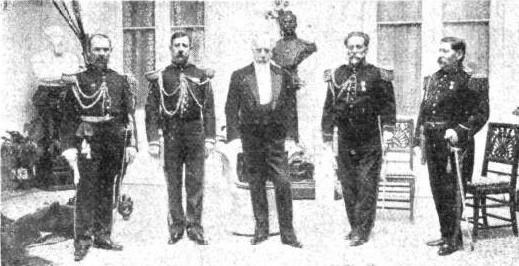
Julio Argentino Roca and his allies

Roca himself had put forward Juárez Celman as his successor, who was his brother-in-law. However, Celman distanced himself from Roca. Celman's government was ultimately tarnished by the Baring crisis and corruption allegations.

Roca did not participate in the 1890 revolution attempt against Celman, which was instigated by Leandro N. Alem and Bartolomé Mitre (Unión Cívica, later Unión Cívica Radical). However, he was pleased in the resulting weakness of Miguel Juárez Celman.

After his first presidency Roca remained important politically, becoming a senator and Minister of the Interior under Carlos Pellegrini. After President Luis Sáenz Peña resigned in January 1895, José Evaristo Uriburu took over the presidency, when Roca was President of the Senate. Because of this, Roca again assumed the duties of President between 28 October 1895 and 8 February 1896, when Uriburu was ill.

== Second presidency (1898–1904) ==
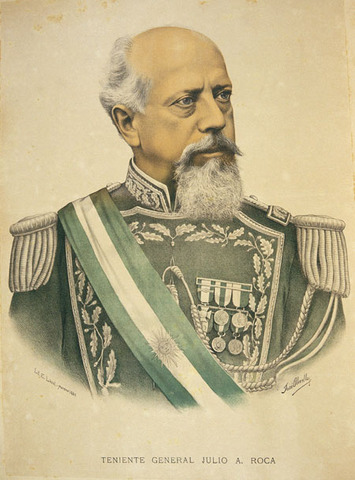
When he assumed the presidency for the second time, Roca appeared prematurely aged.

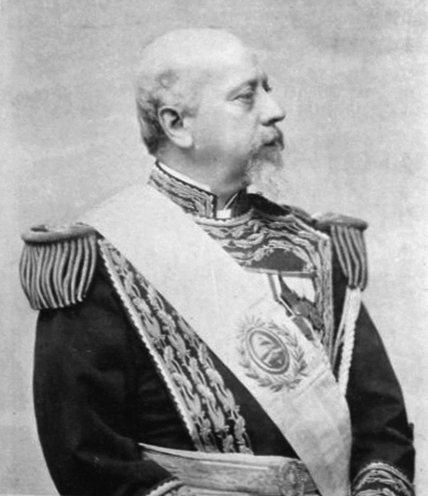
Roca during his second presidential term

In the middle of 1897 the Partido Autonomista Nacional party put forward Roca as a presidential candidate once more. Unopposed, he was able to begin a second regular term in office on 12 October 1898.

Roca assumed the presidency of Argentina for the second time on 12 October 1898. All the provinces supported him except Buenos Aires Province, where Bernardo de Irigoyen of the Radical Civic Union prevailed. He favored agreements with the roquismo and opposed the revolutionary wing led by Hipólito Yrigoyen, which upheld electoral abstention as long as there was no system of free elections based on the secret ballot.

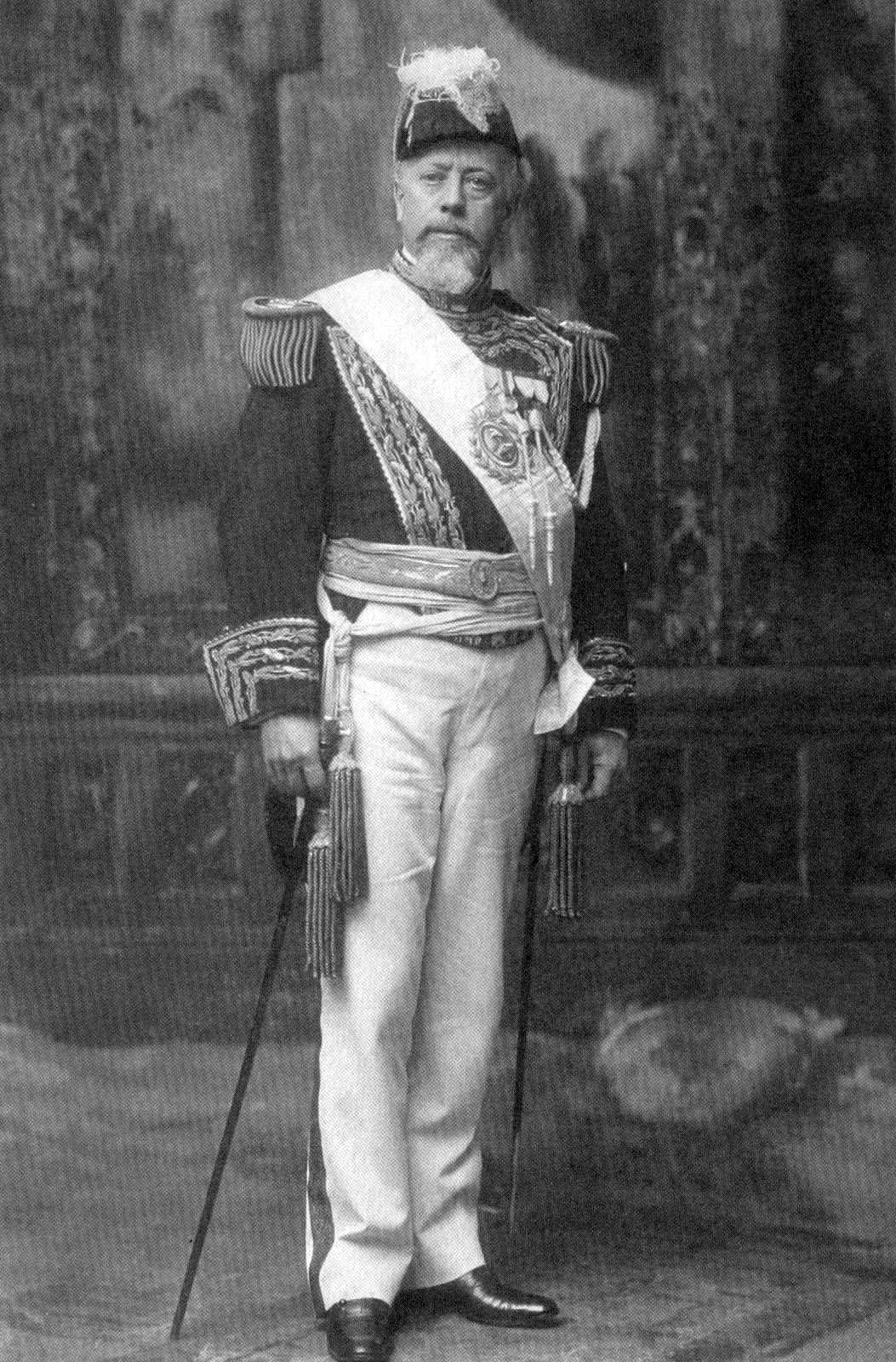
Portrait of the president in 1900

During his second presidency, the Residence Law (Spanish: Ley de Residencia) was passed, which made it possible to expel some of Argentina's trade union leaders, who were noncitizen anarchists and socialists deemed dangerous to Argentina.

During this presidency military service was introduced in 1901 and a border dispute with Chile was settled in 1902 by singing the Pacts of May and erecting Christ the Redeemer of the Andes with significant assistance from Ángela de Oliveira Cézar de Costa the sister of his mistress Guillermina Oliveira Cézar. Luis Drago, Roca's foreign minister, articulated the Drago Doctrine of 1902 asserting that foreign powers could not collect public debts from sovereign American states by armed force or occupation of territory. Argentina's foreign debt increased in this period, although economic growth continued. Roca was unable to continue his political domination, and he was unable to essentially name his successor. Roca's second term ended in 1904, and is considered less successful than his first.

=== Economic policy ===
The Argentine economy had undergone major changes in the previous decade, no longer revolving around wool exports but instead depending on exports of beef - first frozen and later chilled - and grains, mainly wheat, maize, and flax.

The minister of public works, Emilio Civit, initiated a moderate reform in the policy of railway concessions, slowing the expansion of private companies, increasing the extent of state-owned lines, and exercising, with some rigor, control over the fares charged by British companies, which had been consciously designed to harm local production that might compete with British goods.

The economy continued growing, driven by a constant rise in agricultural and livestock prices that had persisted since the years of Uriburu. The president therefore sought to take advantage of the situation to reorganize the financial system and unify the external debt. But the economic situation became complicated when the value of paper money began to decline rapidly in relation to gold. In current terms, a process of accelerated inflation had developed in terms of paper currency. Only those whose income was secured in gold pesos were free from it. In response, Senator Pellegrini introduced and defended the Conversion Law, which was a first step toward the return to free convertibility.

Two years later, the same Pellegrini was entrusted by the president with beginning negotiations in Europe to unify the country's external debt: he was to exchange a debt of 392 million gold pesos at varying interest rates for another of 435 million at 4 percent. According to Pellegrini, this would mean a net saving of 10 million, but public opinion understood that the total amount was being increased by 43 million.

When the bill was presented in the Senate, it was approved by a narrow margin of the senators present, because most of its opponents were absent. And in the debate in the Chamber of Deputies, Pellegrini himself had to admit to deputy José Antonio Terry that the country was committing to transfer daily into a special account at the Banco de la Nación 8 percent of daily customs revenue. Public opinion erupted in indignation, and a large number of students took to the streets - in Buenos Aires, Rosario, and La Plata - to protest both against the bill and against the absence of real democracy. It was the largest opposition demonstration the country had seen up to that point, and it ended with violent incidents.

The government responded by asking Congress to declare a state of siege, and the president immediately withdrew the debt-unification bill, assigning responsibility for it to Pellegrini.

=== Foreign policy ===
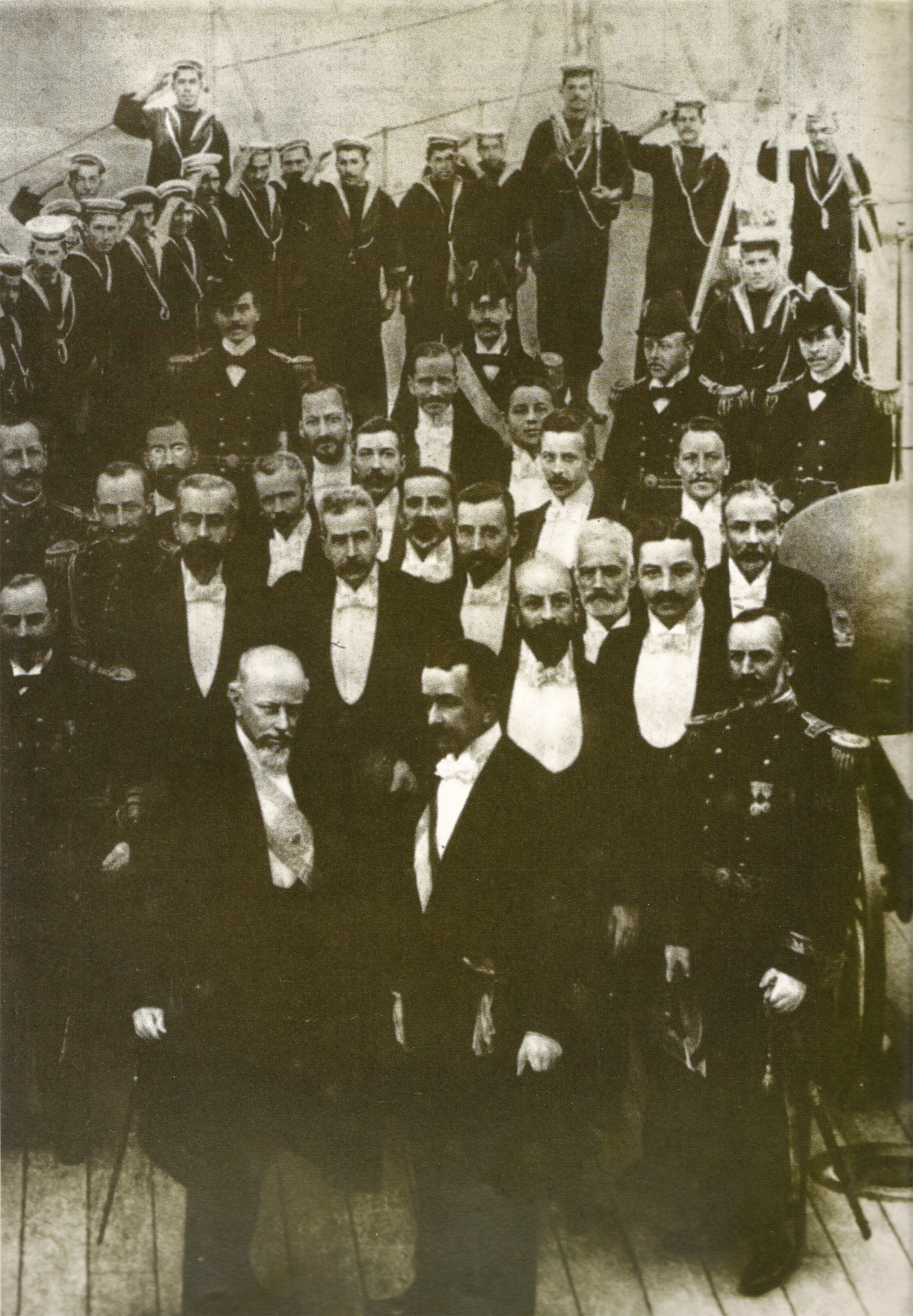
Roca and his Chilean counterpart Federico Errázuriz in the Strait of Magellan.

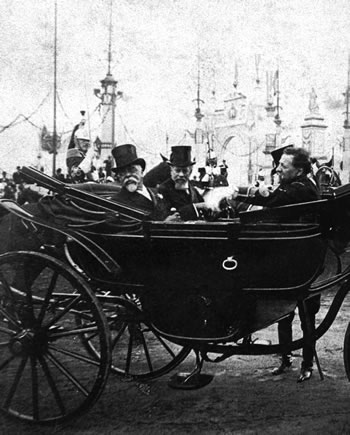
Roca tours the City of Buenos Aires together with his Brazilian counterpart Manuel Ferraz de Campos Sales (1900; AGN archive).

Less than three months after the start of his government, Roca embarked on a trip to the south of the country; the first stop was a brief visit to the Welsh colony in the Chubut territory. He continued sailing to Ushuaia and from there went west through the Beagle Channel, then through the Strait of Magellan to Punta Arenas, where he met with President Errázuriz, in a gesture that helped accelerate the resolution of the dispute over the Puna de Atacama, which was settled by an arbitral award by United States president James Buchanan on 24 March 1899. As a consequence, in 1900 the new National Territory of Los Andes was created.

He then visited Uruguay and Brazil, visits that were reciprocated by the presidents of those countries, in an exchange with no major consequences.

In 1901, on presidential initiative, the government resumed diplomatic relations with the Holy See; in the following years it made several gestures of rapprochement toward the Catholic hierarchy.

On 28 May 1902, his representative in Chile signed with that country the so-called May Pacts, which limited the arms race with that country and agreed to submit both existing and future boundary disputes to arbitration by the British Crown.

In December 1902, foreign minister Luis María Drago launched a broad campaign repudiating the military attack by the United Kingdom and the German Empire on the coasts of Venezuela to demand payment of debts, establishing the Drago Doctrine, a principle universally accepted since then, which prohibits public debt from serving as grounds for armed intervention.

In 1902, ensign José María Sobral took part in the Swedish expedition of Otto Nordenskjöld, which traveled aboard the Norwegian vessel Antarctic, in exchange for resources to winter for a year. After the tragic loss of the ship, the expedition was rescued by the corvette Uruguay under the command of lieutenant commander Julián Irízar. It was the first rescue of human lives on the Antarctic continent carried out by the Argentine Navy. In 1904, Argentina began occupying the first permanent establishment in Antarctic territory, by establishing a base in the South Orkney Islands.

=== The "social question" ===
During his second presidency, the emerging Argentine labor movement experienced a boom: in 1901 the first Argentine trade-union federation was founded, later known as the FORA, and on 22 November 1902 the first general strike was declared. In those years the issue was known as the "social question" or "labor question", and Roca addressed it from two angles: a repressive one and a concessive one.

From the repressive angle, Roca pursued a policy of repression of the labor movement that took shape mainly in the Residence Law No. 4144 on Foreigners, better known as the Residence Law or Cané Law, enacted in 1902, which allowed the imprisonment and expulsion of immigrants without prior trial. A tango sung by Gardel, Al pie de la Santa Cruz, protested those persecutions by saying that "Se venga de un hombre la ley patronal". The repressive policy of Roca's government took on a strong racist, classist, and anti-immigration tone, embodied mainly by minister Miguel Cané.

During Roca's government, the first killings caused by police during strikes and union demonstrations also occurred, beginning with the killing of Cosme Budislavich on 20 October 1901, starting a tragic succession of labor massacres that has extended into the present. On 1 May 1904 he ordered the repression by the police of a gathering of approximately 70,000 workers in the Buenos Aires neighborhood of La Boca, resulting in the death of Juan Ocampo, an eighteen-year-old sailor; during his wake the police also broke in and took his body away.

On 20 September 1904, a few days before the end of his term, Roca initiated the Argentine social security system by promulgating the law creating the National Retirement and Pension Fund for Civil Servants, Employees, and Agents, based on a public contributory pay-as-you-go system. Although there were precedents in Argentine legislation, Law No. 4349 is considered the starting point. For that reason, 20 September is observed in Argentina as "Retiree Day". Over the years, the benefit, which initially covered all public employees and officials, was demanded and obtained by new sectors of public and private workers, who acquired their own funds: bank employees, commerce employees, industrial workers, provincial employees, and others.

Roca also anticipated labor legislation in Argentina. In his message to Congress opening the 1904 sessions, Roca announced and recommended the enactment of a National Labor Law bill sent by the executive branch, regulating labor and employer-worker relations. The National Labor Law bill had been drafted under minister Joaquín V. González, on the basis of the Informe sobre el estado de las clases obreras argentinas commissioned from Juan Bialet Massé. It consisted of 465 articles and regulated all aspects of labor relations (employment contracts, intermediaries, occupational accidents, home work, labor of minors and women, apprenticeship contracts, contracts of Indians, hygiene and safety, employers' and workers' associations, administrative authorities, and boards of conciliation and arbitration). Accused of violating "freedom of commerce", the bill was never debated as a whole, but it was taken into account when the following year the first Argentine labor law was passed, Law No. 4661 on Sunday rest, introduced by deputy Alfredo Palacios, who had been elected the previous year representing the working-class neighborhood of La Boca, becoming the first socialist legislator in the Americas.

=== Educational policy ===
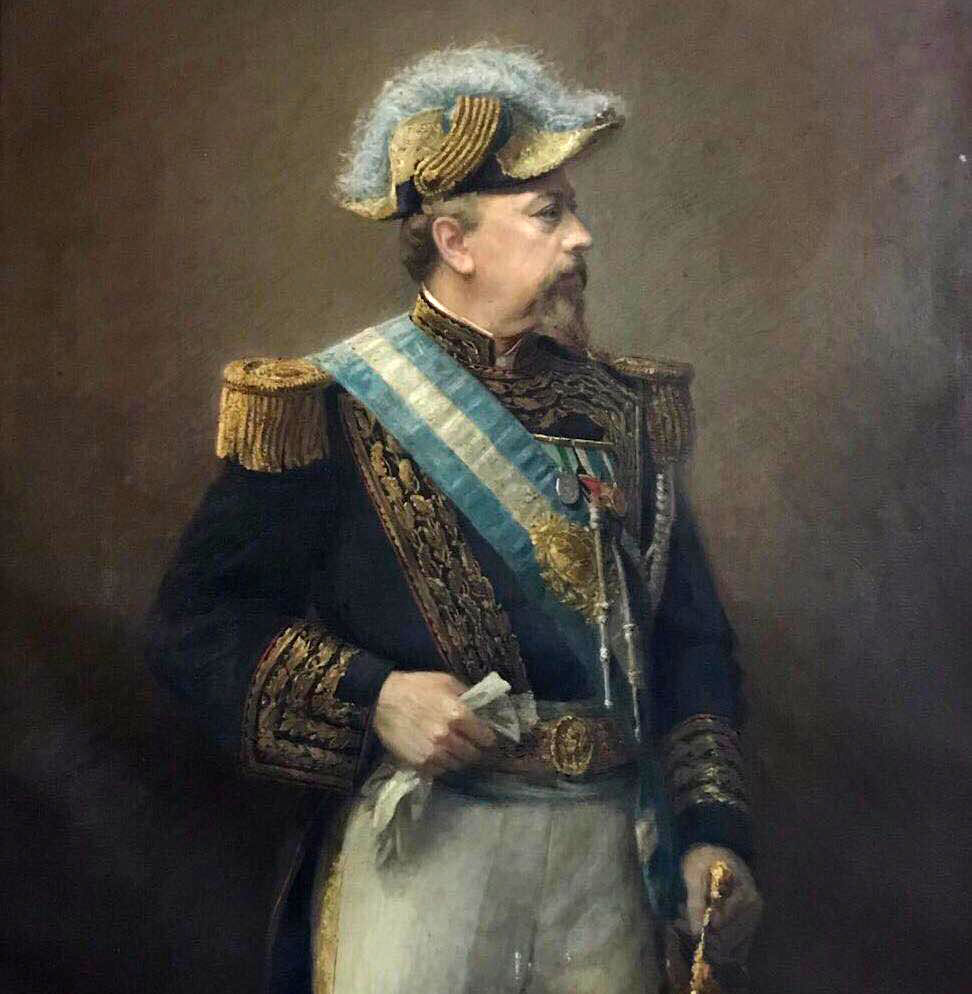
Portrait of General Roca during his second term

His minister of public instruction, Osvaldo Magnasco, proposed creating a large number of technical and agricultural schools, of which there had until then been very few. The attempt was rejected by Congress, and Magnasco had to resign after creating only a few dozen technical schools.

=== Defense policy ===
Roca's first minister of war, Luis María Campos, founded the Higher War School to achieve constant and renewed training in Argentine military thought, as well as uninterrupted research in matters of national defense, strategy, and military history. His second minister of war, Pablo Riccheri, established compulsory military service through Law 4031.

Continuing the strategic policy in naval defense initiated by José Evaristo Uriburu, construction of the Military Port began on 19 May 1898 and the first stage was completed in 1902, with the inauguration of the dry dock by President Roca himself aboard the battleship Garibaldi.

A rapid modernization of the army was also begun and new military bases were acquired, such as Campo de Mayo, with the intention of preventing barracks inside the capital from serving as instruments for military revolutions. The Regiment of Mounted Grenadiers founded by General José de San Martín was re-created to serve as escort to the president of the nation.

=== Political situation ===
In response to the snub over the public debt issue, Pellegrini broke with Roca and began to form the Autonomist Party, in which several leaders who had been followers of Juárez Celman and members of an ephemeral Democratic Party began to participate; Roque Sáenz Peña also joined it. For their part, Mitre's followers left the National Civic Union to form a new party, the Republican Party. Despite the importance the press assigned to them, in the 1902 elections - in which the single-member district system had not yet been approved - both parties obtained poor results.

In Buenos Aires Province, Marcelino Ugarte defeated the candidate of Roca and governor Irigoyen, thereby gaining the government; he immediately strengthened his caudillo-style structure, extended the networks of his contacts, and negotiated his incorporation into the National Party.

Pellegrini's distancing caused a cabinet crisis and forced Roca to reorganize the PAN. During the rest of his term he had to change ministers several times.

For his part, surprised by the protests of July 1901, Roca decided to distract public opinion by proposing and securing passage of a law establishing a political reform devised by interior minister Joaquín V. González: in order to increase the representativeness of deputies, the system of full-list elections was replaced by a division of the country into constituencies, in each of which one deputy would be elected.

Roca decided to control the election of his successor, for which he convened a Convention of Notables, which discussed several alternatives. After the failure of the almost certain candidacy of Felipe Yofre, it chose a former mitrista, Manuel Quintana, and former governor of Córdoba José Figueroa Alcorta for vice president.

The law on single-member districts was applied only to the election of national deputies and presidential electors in 1904; it had no notable effects on the distribution of political offices, with the sole exception of the election of Alfredo Palacios, the first deputy of the Socialist Party, which had been founded in 1896. Quintana, for his part, was elected by an overwhelming majority, in an election in which the number of votes increased significantly only in Buenos Aires and the Capital.

== Later years ==
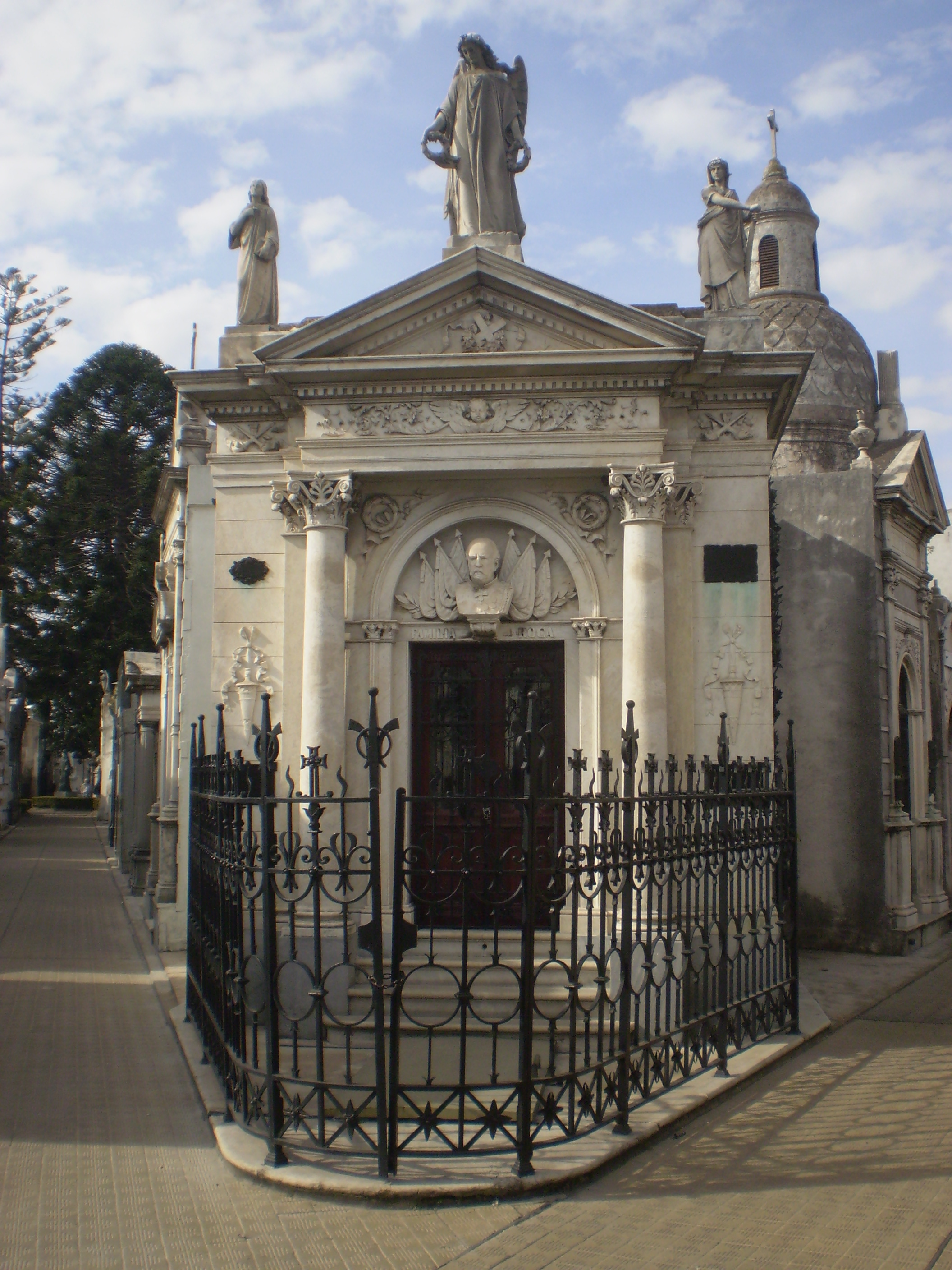
Tomb of Roca at the Recoleta Cemetery, Buenos Aires

In 1912 Roca was appointed as Special Ambassador of Argentina to Brazil by President Roque Sáenz Peña. Roca returned to Argentina in 1914 and died in Buenos Aires on October 19, 1914. He was buried in La Recoleta Cemetery in Buenos Aires.

His son, Julio Argentino Roca, Jr., became vice-president of Argentina in 1932 to 1938.

== Legacy ==
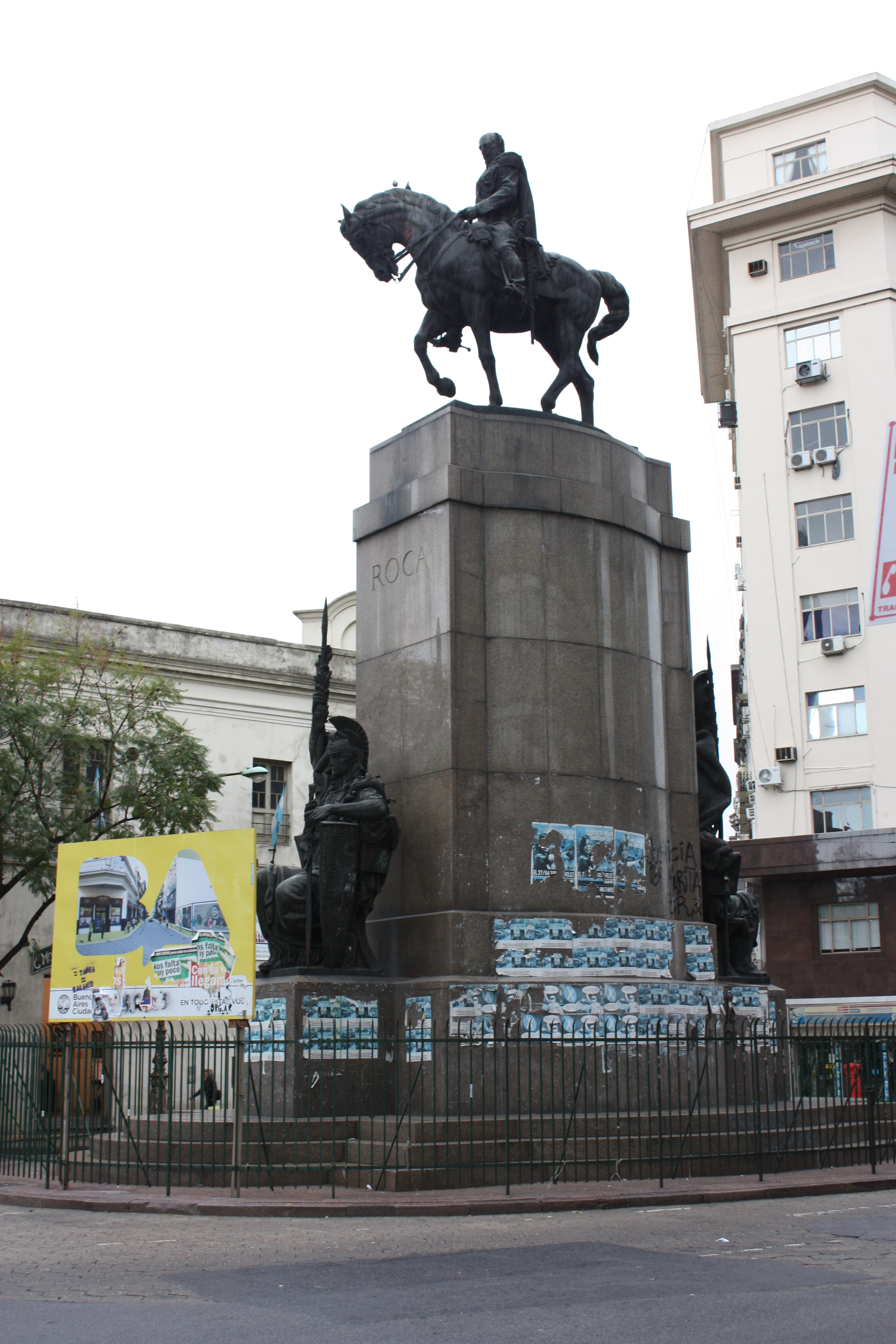
Monument to Julio Argentino Roca in Buenos Aires

Roca's thought has been associated with the idea of Juan Bautista Alberdi around the idea of a "possible republic": a republican government, with broad civil and economic freedoms but with an exercise of political life restricted to the ruling elites. The possible republic would give way to the true republic, of a fully democratic character. The ideal of a possible republic, with its politically conservative line, was one of the sources of political conflict that led to the emergence of various oppositions, even from the members of the Generation of '80 themselves.

During the twentieth century, Roca was recognized as one of the statesmen who forged the foundations of the modern Argentine republic. As such, Roca has been honored by designating cities, departments, lakes, streets, avenues, squares, monuments, parks, schools and railway lines throughout the country. Examples include the city of General Roca in the province of Río Negro, the town of Presidencia Roca in the province of Chaco; the town of Presidente Roca in the province of Santa Fe; the Colonia Roca of the province of Entre Ríos; the General Roca Department of the province of Córdoba. In Buenos Aires, a major thoroughfare and a railway branch are named after him and an equestrian statue of him was erected in 1941. Another equestrian statue was inaugurated in 1941 in the Bariloche Civic Center.

In recent years, there has been an increasing re-evaluation of Roca's place in Argentine history, particularly his involvement in the Conquest of the Desert. Some groups claim that he committed genocide against the Native Argentines. Those who consider Roca as genocidal have proposed removing the name Roca from the places and areas with which he has been honored.

Javier Milei praised Roca for his economy freedom, besides the fact that Roca also advocated for state interventionism and not only for economic liberalism.

== Tributes and criticism ==
At the inauguration ceremony of the current President of Argentina, Javier Milei, on 10 December 2023, the latter referred to Julio Argentino Roca as "one of the best presidents in Argentine history". During his address to the people of the nation, President Milei quoted a phrase spoken by Roca in his inaugural speech before Congress on 12 October 1880.

Some of the many monuments to the national statesman

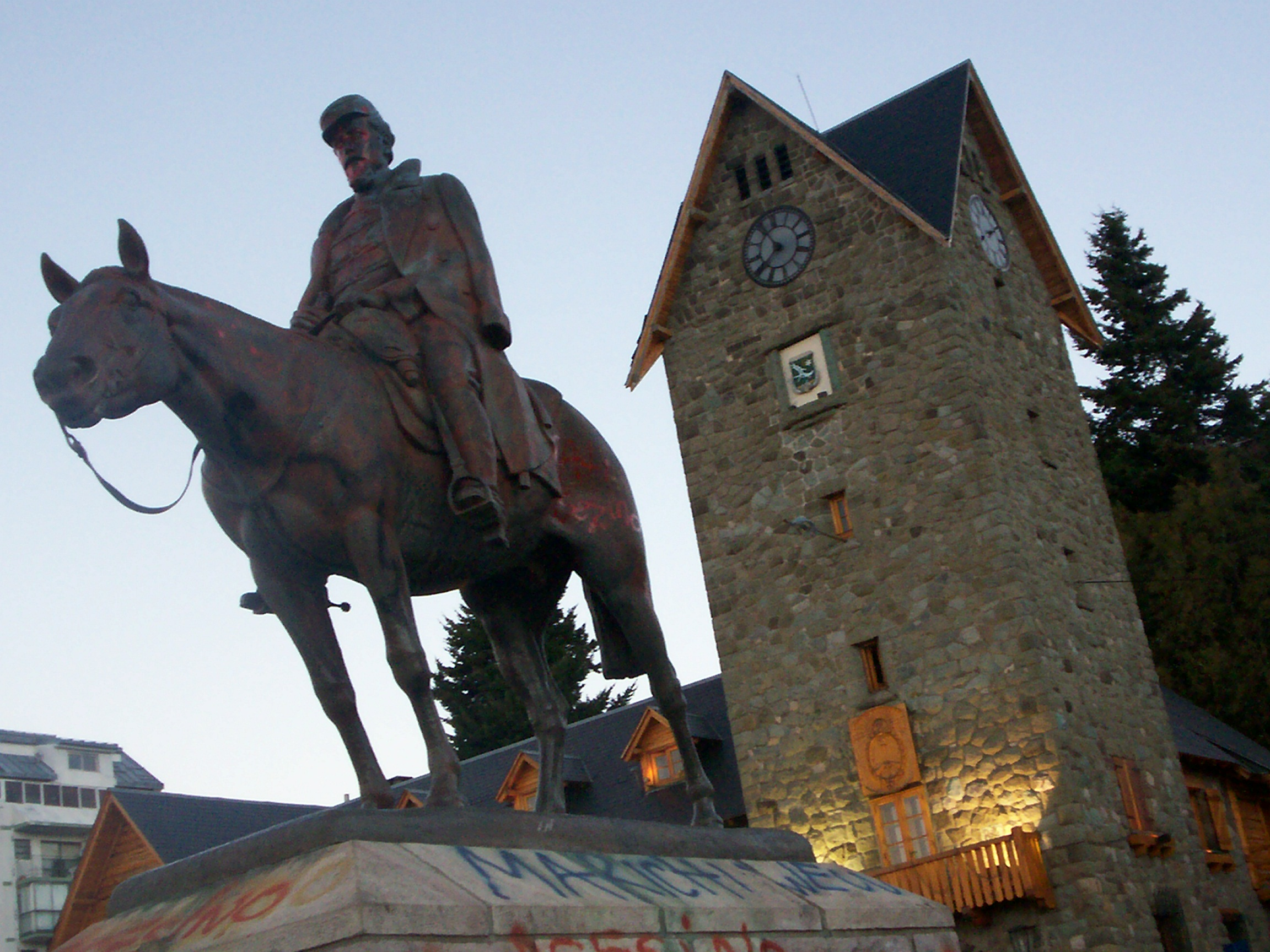
Equestrian monument to Julio Argentino Roca (Bariloche Civic Center).

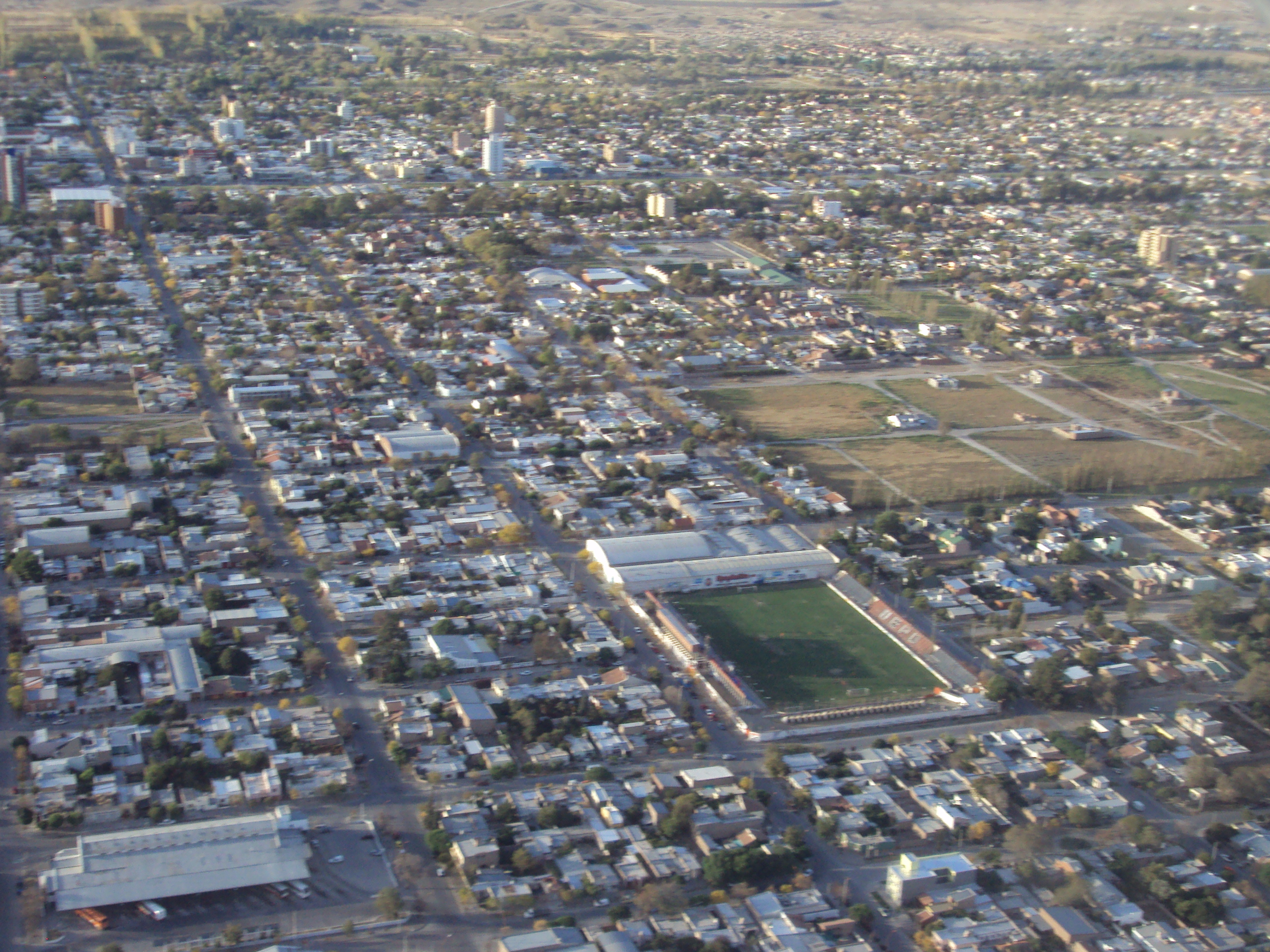
Aerial view of the city of General Roca (Río Negro Province).

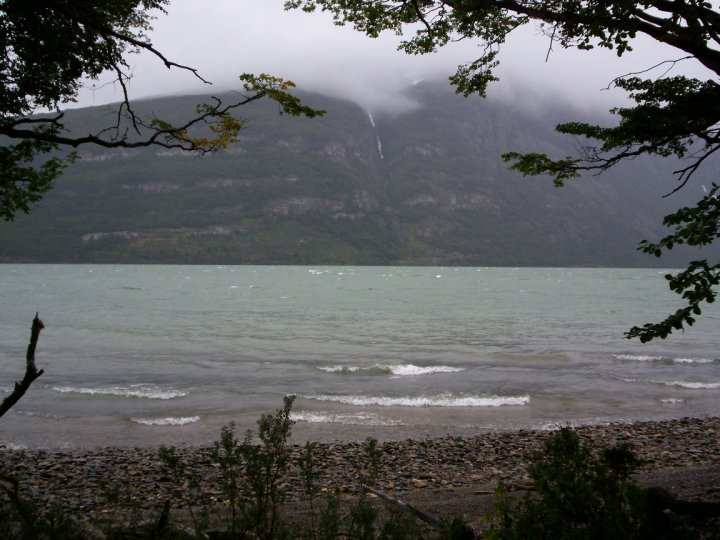
Lago Roca (Tierra del Fuego National Park).

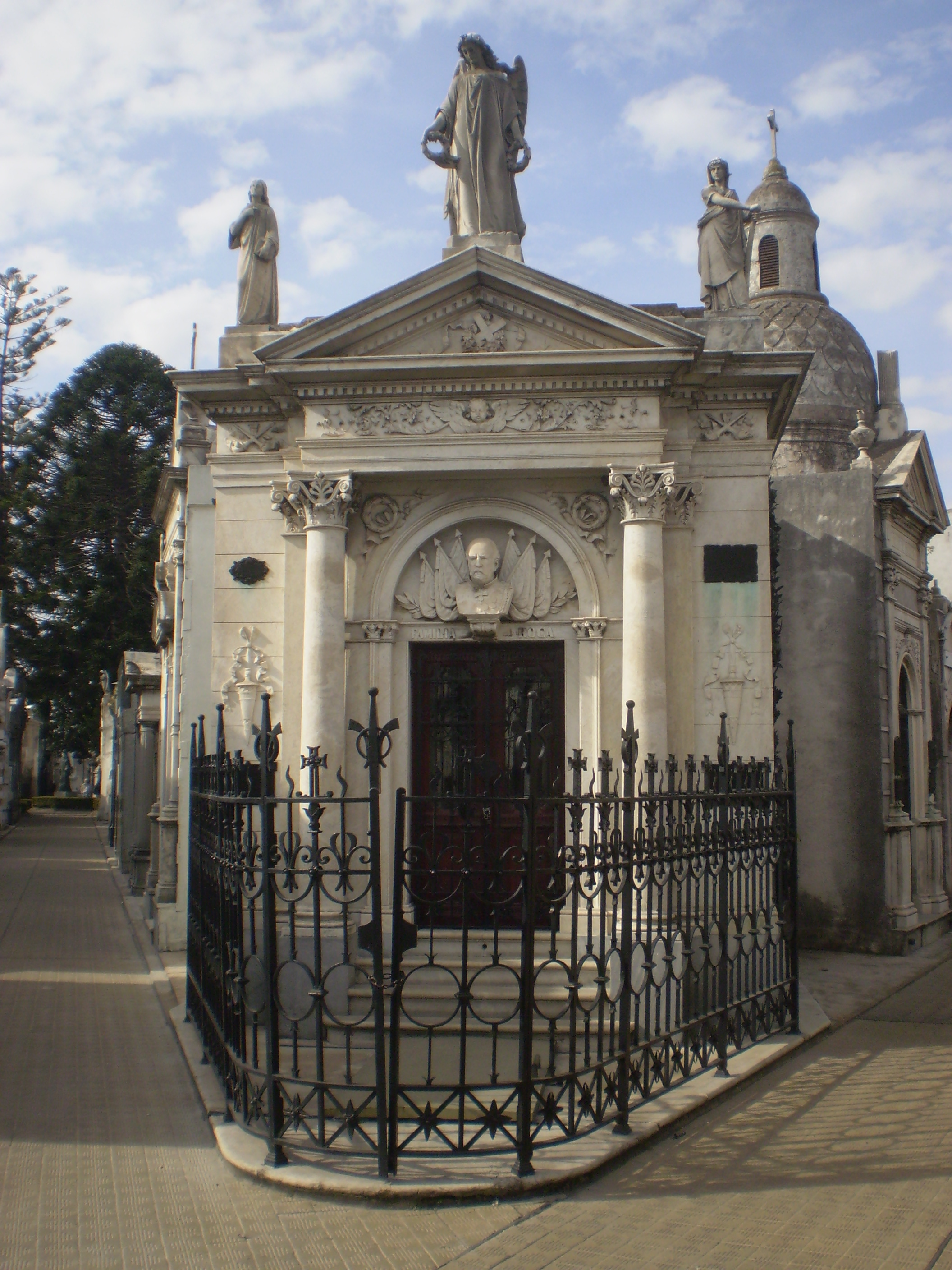
Funerary monument to Roca (Recoleta Cemetery, City of Buenos Aires).

=== Anti-Roca currents ===
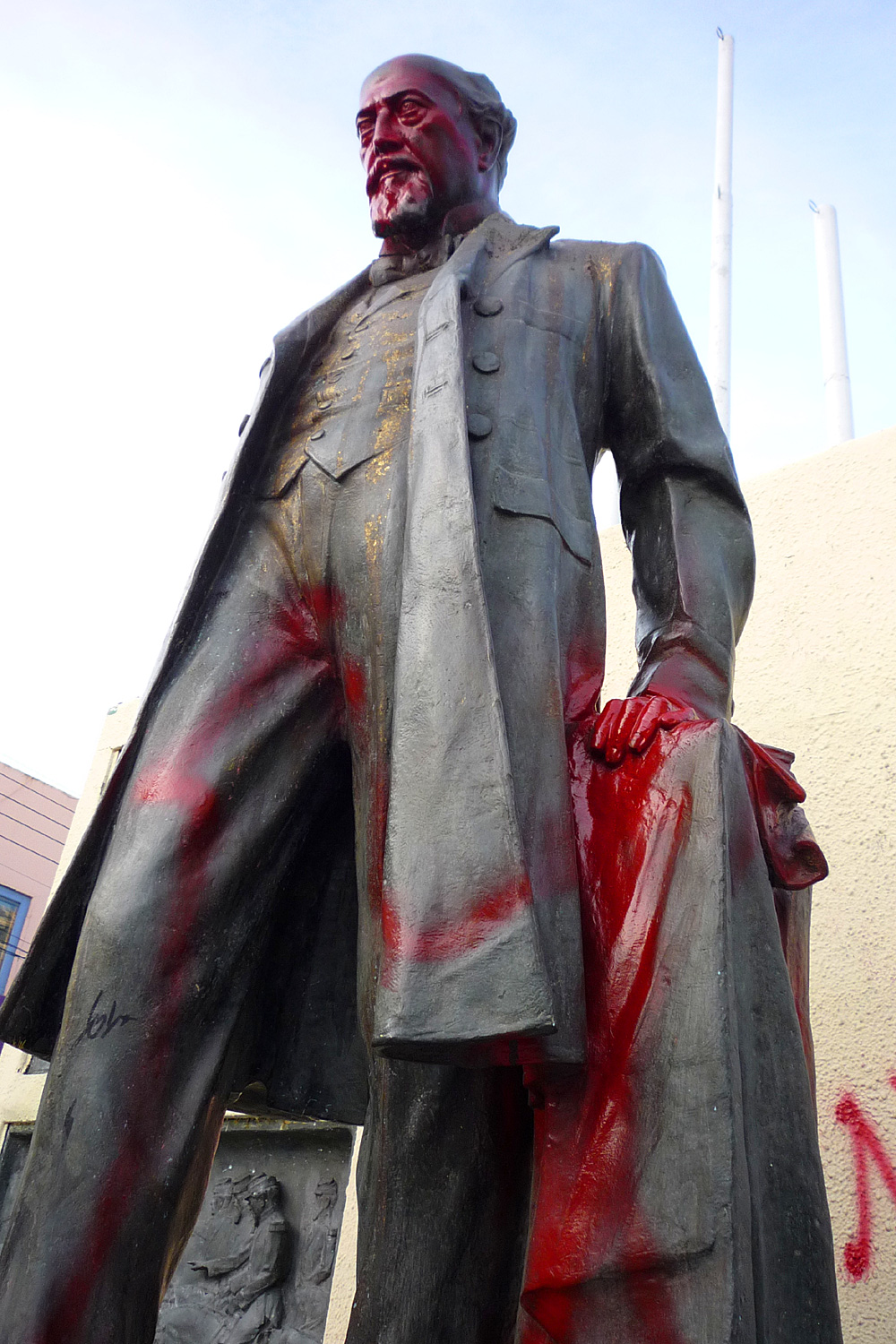
Vandalized monument in Río Gallegos (2010)

Various political and historiographical currents have questioned his role, associating him, among other things, with corruption, the so-called oligarchic republic or conservative republic prior to 1916 - the year of the election of the first president by means of the secret ballot - or with the annihilation of thousands of Indigenous people in Patagonia, describing him as genocidal. This position proposes removing Roca's name from places and institutions with which he has been honored. This current of thought succeeded in replacing Roca's name on some lakes, schools, streets and squares. For example:

- In Río Gallegos, Julio A. Roca Avenue was renamed Presidente Néstor Kirchner, and years later the municipality also removed a statue of Roca located on that avenue.
- In Resistencia, the street named Julio A. Roca was renamed Cacique Maidana.
- In General Pinto, the name of Julio Argentino Roca Street was changed to Pueblos Originarios, similar to the case of Primary School No. 7 in the city of Tandil.
- Julio Argentino Roca's name was also removed from a street in the Sarmiento neighborhood of Villa Nueva in Córdoba. In the municipality of Del Campillo, the name of Roca Street was changed to Ramón Cabral.
- The name of Roca Street was changed to Mercedes Sosa in Mar de las Pampas, Villa Gesell, Buenos Aires Province.
- The names of schools have been changed in La Pampa Province, and in the Buenos Aires locality of Azul.
- Secondary School No. 2 in Jujuy was renamed Marina Vilte.
- In Banfield, a school replaced his name with that of Julio Cortázar. Even sports clubs opted to change their names.
- In the town of Sierras Bayas, signs bearing the name Julio Roca were removed in 2013.
- Provincial School No. 38 at Esperanza Base in Argentine Antarctica changed the name Julio Argentino Roca to Raúl Ricardo Alfonsín.
- In Bahía Blanca, there was an attempt to change the name of Campaña del Desierto Park, and an online popular vote was called so that citizens could choose a new name; however, the most-voted name was Julio Argentino Roca. The government eventually reversed course and the original name was retained.
- In July 2023, the mayor of Bariloche, Gustavo Gennuso, attempted to remove the monument to Roca located in the Bariloche civic center, but the courts ultimately forbade him from doing so thanks to a collective injunction.

=== Numismatics ===
The effigy of Julio Argentino Roca, engraved by the Italian engraver Trento Cionini, appears on the obverse of the one hundred-peso banknote of the Argentine Republic issued by the Mint from 1992 until 2015, when it was replaced by the banknote of the same denomination bearing the image of Eva Perón.

== Books ==
- Carlos Pellegrini and the Crisis of the Argentine Elites, 1880-1916, by Douglas W. Richmond (1989).
- Soy Roca, by Félix Luna (1989).

== See also ==
- History of Argentina
- Conquest of the Desert

Political offices
Preceded by Nicolás Avellaneda	President of Argentina; 1880–1886	Succeeded by Miguel Juárez Celman
Preceded by José E. Uriburu	President of Argentina; 1898–1904	Succeeded by Manuel Quintana
