= Elías Villanueva =

Argentine politician

Elías Villanueva (May 3, 1845 - April 24, 1913) was an Argentine politician. He was Governor of Mendoza Province from 1878 until 1881.
