= Adolfo Alsina =

2nd Vice President of Argentina

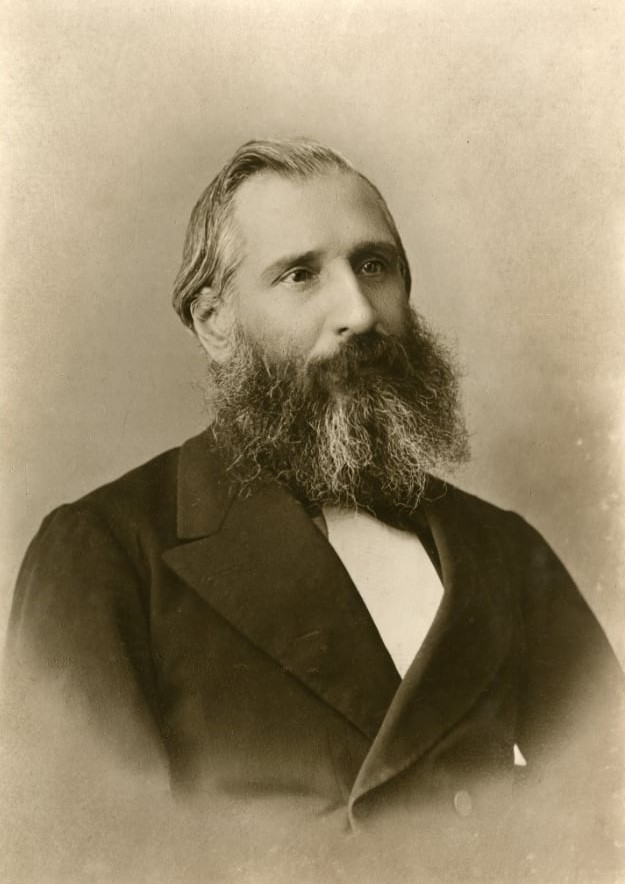

4th Vice President of Argentina
- In office October 12, 1868 – October 12, 1874
- President: Domingo Sarmiento
- Preceded by: Marcos Paz
- Succeeded by: Mariano Acosta

Personal details
- Born: January 4, 1829 Buenos Aires
- Died: December 29, 1877 (aged 48) Carhué, Buenos Aires Province
- Party: National Autonomist Party
- Profession: Lawyer

Adolfo Alsina Maza (January 4, 1829 – December 29, 1877) was an Argentine lawyer and Unitarian politician, who was one of the founders of the Autonomist Party and the National Autonomist Party.

== Biography ==
Alsina was born in Buenos Aires, the son of Unitarian politician Valentín Alsina and Antonia Maza (daughter of Manuel Vicente Maza). He moved to Montevideo, Uruguay when Juan Manuel de Rosas became Governor of Buenos Aires Province for the second time, in 1835. In the neighbouring country Alsina started his law studies. After the Battle of Caseros in 1852, his family returned to Argentina, and his father was named a Minister by president Vicente López y Planes.

Adolfo finished law school and joined the Unitarian army in the civil war. In 1860, after the Battle of Pavón and the National Union Pact, he took part in the commission responsible for the constitution reform of 1860. He was elected a deputy in 1862. When the subject of federalisation, supported by Bartolomé Mitre, was considered in the Chamber of Deputies, Alsina provoked a split in the Partido Unitario and founded the Partido Autonomista.

In 1866 he was elected governor of the Buenos Aires Province. Alsina considered running for president, but withdrew when he discovered he did not have the support of most of the province. Domingo Sarmiento was elected president, and named Alsina his vice-president.

When the presidency of Sarmiento finished in 1874, Alsina joined Nicolás Avellaneda to create the Partido Autonomista Nacional, through which Avellaneda reached the presidency and named Alsina Minister of War and Navy.

At the end of 1875, the Native Americans of Patagonia and the Pampas, especially the Mapuche, launched organised resistance against the territorial expansion of the southern border of the emerging nation. The first stage of the "Conquest of the Desert" began with the creation of a two meter deep, three meter wide trench called zanja de Alsina to prevent the free movement of horses and stolen cattle. Alsina also ordered the creation of forts intercommunicated by telegraph.

Trying to understand the native peoples, he decided to study the situation personally; but he fell ill while in the pampas town of Carhué, and died of renal failure, aged 48.

== Notes ==
Political offices
Preceded by Marcos Paz	Vice President of Argentina; 1868-1874	Succeeded by Mariano Acosta
