= Carlos Tejedor (politician) =

Argentine jurist and politician

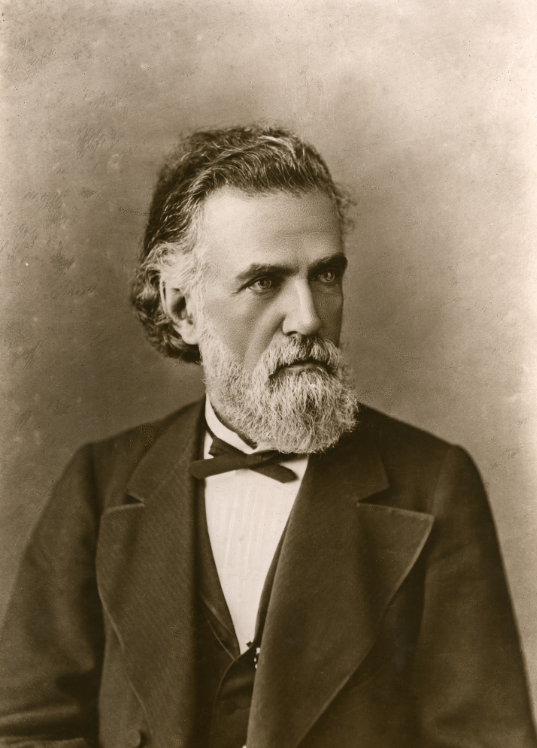

National Deputy
- In office 1898–1902
- Constituency: Buenos Aires
- In office 1874; 1866–1869
- Constituency: Buenos Aires Province

Governor of Buenos Aires
- In office 1878–1880
- Preceded by: Carlos Casares
- Succeeded by: José María Moreno

Minister of Foreign Relations
- In office 1870–1874
- Preceded by: Mariano Varela
- Succeeded by: Pedro A. Pardo

Attorney General of Argentina
- In office 1875–1878
- Preceded by: Francisco Pico
- Succeeded by: Eduardo Costa

Personal details
- Born: November 4, 1817 Buenos Aires
- Died: January 3, 1903 (aged 85)
- Spouse: Etelvina Ocampo

Carlos Tejedor (November 4, 1817 – January 3, 1903) was an Argentine jurist and politician, Governor of Buenos Aires Province between 1878 and 1880. Tejedor was a prominent figure in the movement against the Federalization of Buenos Aires.

== Life and times ==
Tejedor was born in Buenos Aires to Antonia Carrero and Antonio Tejedor, in 1817. He enrolled at the University of Buenos Aires, where he earned a law degree in 1837, and married Etelvina Ocampo. He became a prominent supporter of the interests of Buenos Aires, and joined Ramón Maza in an 1839 plot against Governor Juan Manuel de Rosas. The group protested what they saw as too many concessions on the part of Rosas toward other provincial Caudillos in order to buttress the fragile Argentine Confederation. Following Maza's execution, however, Tejedor joined Unitarian Party leader General Juan Lavalle, and fled to Chile, where he resumed his law practice and became a friend and ally of future Chilean President Manuel Montt.

He returned to Buenos Aires following Rosas' overthrow after the Battle of Caseros of 1852, and became a central figure in the movement led by Valentín Alsina against the Federalization of Buenos Aires as the national capital through his position of editor-in-chief of El Nacional. He opposed the San Nicolás Agreement, Entre Ríos leader Justo José de Urquiza's bid for national unity, and plotted the assassination of Urquiza with the Logia Juan-Juan. The attempt on Urquiza a failure, a revolt erupted in Buenos Aires on September 11, 1852, and the latter province became independent of the Confederation for the remainder of the decade. Tejedor then collaborated with Dalmacio Vélez Sarsfield in the drafting of a Provincial Constitution for Buenos Aires, the following year.

Tejedor negotiated the surrender of Buenos Aires forces at the Battle of Cepeda (1859), leading to the Pact of San José de Flores and to Buenos Aires' recognition of the Argentine Constitution. Tejedor, however, rallied opposition to the treaty, and in particular, its provisions for the federalization of the Buenos Aires Customs. Ultimately, these disputes led to the Battle of Pavón (1861), where General Bartolomé Mitre's victory allowed Tejedor and other Buenos Aires leaders to impose terms for the province's readmission into Argentina.

Following Mitre's 1862 election as President of Argentina, Tejedor was charged with codifying the nation's penal code. He was elected to the Argentine Chamber of Deputies in 1866, and was appointed Foreign Minister in 1870 by President Domingo Sarmiento. His tenure in the post was highlighted by international boundary negotiations following the Paraguayan War.

Allegations of electoral fraud in the elections of 1874, in which Mitre was defeated for the Presidency, led to another revolt by the former president; its prompt defeat led to his exile, however, and Tejedor was sworn in as Congressman in his replacement. Viewed as a die-hard proponent of Buenos Aires privileges by lawmakers from the hinterland, he resigned, and served briefly as director of the National Library of Argentina, and as Ambassador to Brazil. He accepted the post of Solicitor General for President Nicolás Avellaneda in 1875, contributing to the advancement of the commercial and civil codes. He then served as Dean of the University of Buenos Aires Law School in 1876 and 1877.

Returning to politics, he was elected Governor of Buenos Aires in 1878, and in 1880, ran for the Presidency in opposition to National Autonomist Party leader Julio Roca. Winning only in Buenos Aires and Corrientes Provinces, Tejedor organized an uprising, forcing the temporary relocation of Federal Government offices to Belgrano (then a suburb of the capital). His defeat led to his resignation as governor, and negotiations begun in his stead by Mitre with the victor, President Roca, led to the definitive establishment of Buenos Aires as the nation's capital. He published a memoir of the events, La defensa de Buenos Aires, in 1881, and returned to academia and private law practice.

Tejedor was again elected to the Chamber of Deputies in 1894 for Buenos Aires, serving until 1898. He died in Buenos Aires in 1903, at age 85, and was buried in the La Recoleta Cemetery. The Carlos Tejedor Partido of Buenos Aires Province is named after him.

| Preceded by Carlos Casares | Governor of Buenos Aires Province; 1878–1880 | Succeeded by José María Moreno |
