= Mariano Acosta (politician) =

5th Vice President of Argentina

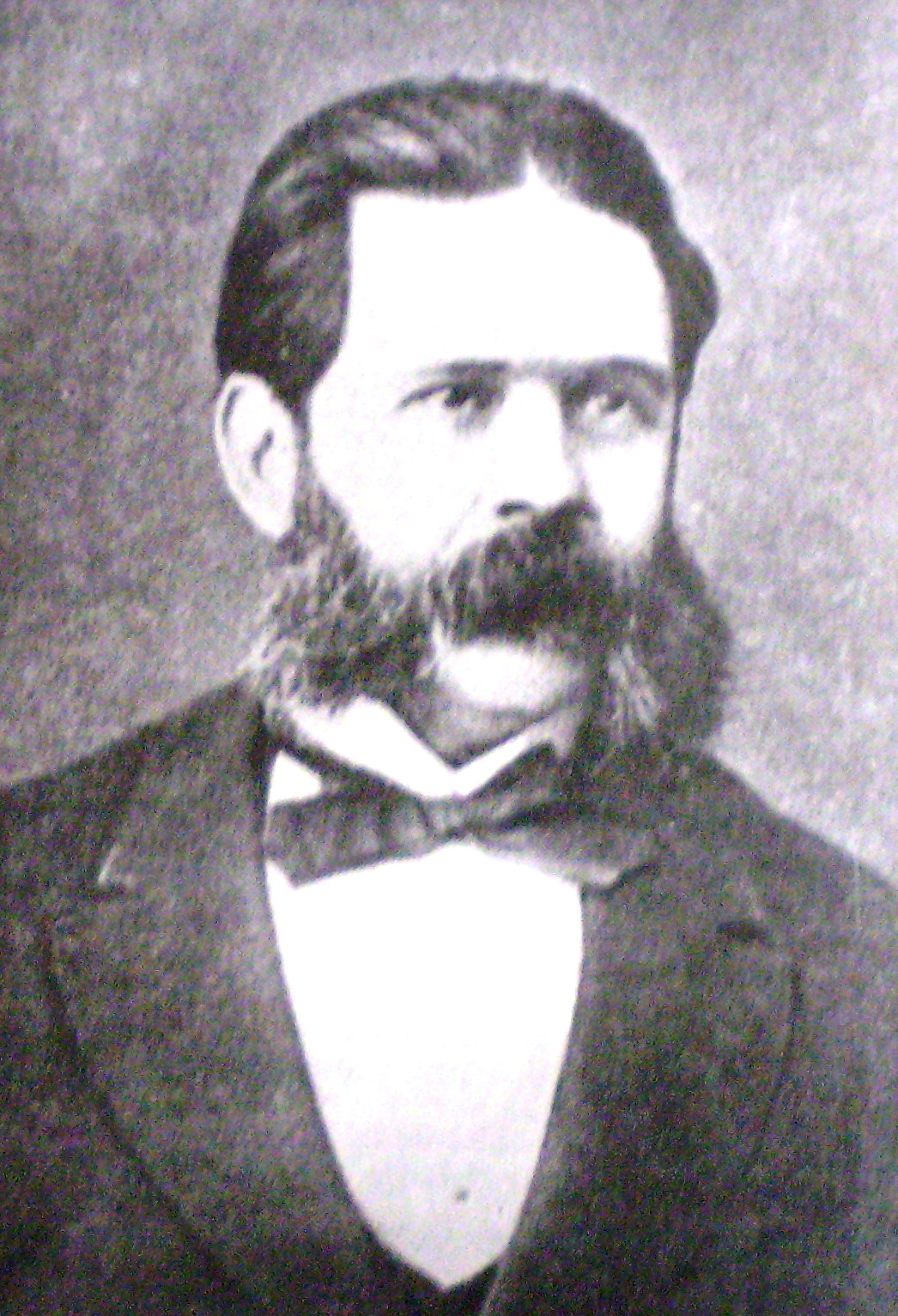

5th Vice President of Argentina
- In office October 12, 1874 – October 12, 1880
- President: Nicolás Avellaneda
- Preceded by: Adolfo Alsina
- Succeeded by: Francisco Bernabé Madero

Personal details
- Born: September 8, 1825 Buenos Aires, Argentina
- Died: September 17, 1893 (aged 68) Buenos Aires, Argentina
- Party: National Autonomist Party
- Profession: Lawyer

Mariano Acosta (September 8, 1825 – September 17, 1893) was an Argentine lawyer and politician.

== Life and times ==
Acosta was born in 1825 to Magdalena Santa Coloma Lezica, the daughter of a prominent Buenos Aires Province landowner, and José Francisco Acosta, from Corrientes Province. Opposed to the repressive regime of Governor Juan Manuel de Rosas, Acosta emigrated to Europe shortly after his secondary school graduation. He returned following Rosas' defeat at the 1852 Battle of Caseros, and was elected to the Buenos Aires Province Legislature later that year. He served as a lieutenant in the Patricios Regiment, and took part in Valentín Alsina's successful pro-autonomy uprising in 1853 against the victor at Caseros, Justo José de Urquiza.

He was returned to the Buenos Aires Legislature the following year and was named Commissioner of Immigration. A dispute with the new Governor,, kept Acosta out of public service from 1855 to 1860, when he was elected to the provincial constitutional convention. Acosta married in 1857; his wife, Remedios Oromi, was a niece of Remedios de Escalada, the erstwhile wife of General José de San Martín (leader of the Argentine War of Independence). Governor appointed Acosta Minister of Government in 1862, and he served as a member of the Veterans' Assistance Commission from 1866 to 1872. Acosta, in 1871, also served as a legal adviser to the newly formed Western Railway, and as President of the Bank of the Province of Buenos Aires.

Acosta returned briefly to the legislature, and in 1872, he was elected Governor of Buenos Aires Province. His tenure became known for its works of infrastructure, and among his varied public works initiatives, he appointed Argentina's first engineer, Luis Huergo, to plan an extensive road and canal building program. Governor Acosta promulgated a new provincial constitution in December 1873, and shortly afterwards, he was named running mate to the National Autonomist Party nominee, Nicolás Avellaneda.

Elected handily in September 1874, Avellaneda and Acosta were opposed by Bartolomé Mitre, who maintained a rivalry with Avellaneda's benefactor, outgoing Vice President Adolfo Alsina. Acosta devoted his tenure as Vice President to the coordination of the vigorous school-building program President Avenalleda had inherited from his predecessor, Domingo Sarmiento. He also served as President of the Commission for the Repatriation of the Remains of General San Martín, which Avellaneda had created in 1874, and which fulfilled its objective in 1880; the Liberator of Argentina and Peru had died in France in 1850.

Acosta retired from public life in 1880, and died in Buenos Aires in 1893, at age 68; a lay Franciscan, Acosta was buried in that city's Church of St. Francis. Having established a town (Ramallo) and a county (Almirante Brown), Acosta had another town, Mariano Acosta, Buenos Aires, named in his honor.

Political offices
| Preceded by Adolfo Alsina | Vice President of Argentina; 1874–1880 | Succeeded by Francisco Bernabé Madero |
