= Nicolás Avellaneda =

3rd President of Argentina

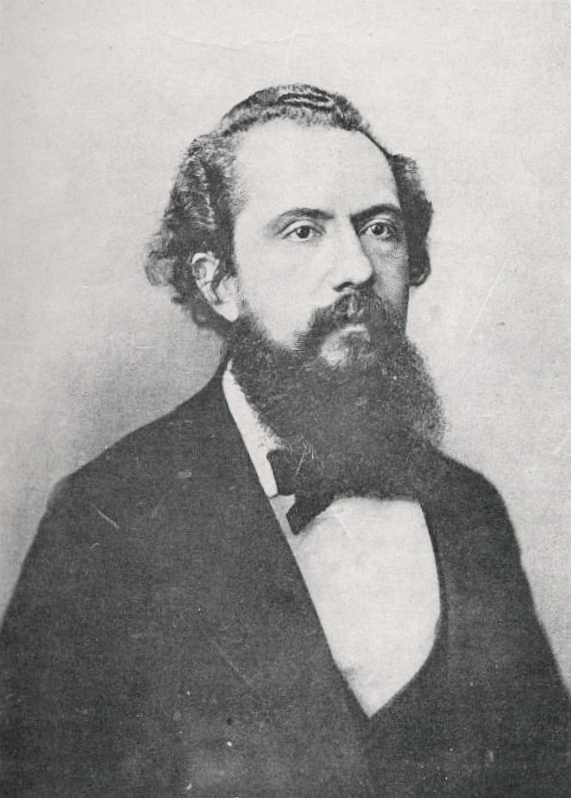

8th President of Argentina
- In office October 12, 1874 – October 11, 1880
- Vice President: Mariano Acosta
- Preceded by: Domingo F. Sarmiento
- Succeeded by: Julio A. Roca

National Senator
- In office May 3, 1882 – November 25, 1885
- Constituency: Tucumán
- In office May 3, 1884 – October 10, 1884
- Constituency: Tucumán

Minister of Justice and Public Instruction
- In office October 12, 1868 – August 10, 1873
- President: Domingo Faustino Sarmiento
- Preceded by: Eduardo Costa
- Succeeded by: Juan Crisóstomo Albarracín

Personal details
- Born: October 3, 1837 San Miguel de Tucumán, Tucumán
- Died: November 24, 1885 (aged 48) At sea
- Party: National Autonomist Party
- Spouse: Carmen Nóbrega Miguens
- Profession: Lawyer

Nicolás Remigio Aurelio Avellaneda Silva (3 October 1837 – 24 November 1885) was an Argentine politician and journalist, and President of Argentina from 1874 to 1880. Avellaneda's main projects while in office were banking and education reform, leading to Argentina's economic growth. The most important events of his government were the Conquest of the Desert and the transformation of the Buenos Aires into a federal district.

His grandson was José Domingo Molina Gómez, who took the presidency when Juan Perón was captured.

== Biography ==
Born in San Miguel de Tucumán, his mother moved with him to Bolivia after the death of his father, Marco Avellaneda, during a revolt against Juan Manuel de Rosas. He studied law at Córdoba, without graduating. Back at Tucumán he founded El Eco del Norte, and moved to Buenos Aires in 1857, becoming director of the El Nacional and editor of El Comercio de la Plata. He finished his studies at Buenos Aires, meeting Domingo Faustino Sarmiento. Sarmiento helped him to become teacher of economy at the University of Buenos Aires. He wrote "Estudio sobre las leyes de tierras públicas" (Spanish: Study of the laws about public lands), proposing to give the lands to producers that make production from them. This system, similar to the one employed at the United States, suggested to reduce bureaucracy and pointed that this would allow stable populations and population growth.

He was a member of the house of representatives in 1859 and Minister of Government of Adolfo Alsina in the Buenos Aires province in 1866. During Domingo Faustino Sarmiento's presidency, he was Minister of Justice and Education. He implemented the educational reform that was defining of his government.

Avellaneda was the president of Argentina from 1874 to 1880.

He had served in the Argentine Senate for five months in 1874 and returned to the Senate after his Presidency, in 1883, and until his death. He died at the age of 48 on a ship returning from medical treatment in France. He is the shortest-lived President of Argentina.

== Presidency ==
=== Overview ===
Avellaneda attained the presidency in 1874. Aged 37, he was the youngest Argentine president ever elected. He had its legitimacy contested by Bartolomé Mitre and supported by Domingo Faustino Sarmiento. Mitre deployed the army against Avellaneda but was defeated by Julio Argentino Roca. Mitre was held prisoner and judged by military justice, but Avellaneda indulged him in order to promote pacification. He also included Rufino de Elizalde and José María Gutiérrez, supporters of Mitre, as members of his cabinet.

In line with people like Alberdi or Sarmiento, who thought that European immigration was crucial to the Argentine development, he promoted the "Avellaneda law" that allowed European farmers ease to get terrains. The immigration numbers were doubled in a few years.

He was the first civilian president, not belonging to any of the armed forces. As Sarmiento told him when handing over the presidential sash, "You are the first president who does not know how to use a pistol."

Having won in the Revolution of 1874 and bringing peace to the country, Avellaneda faced a serious economic crisis, centering his efforts on the control of the land with the Conquest of the Desert and expanding the railroads, the cereal and meat exports, and the European immigration, specially to Patagonia. During his presidency, the economy of Argentina was seriously affected by the European crisis putting the country on the edge of debt default. Deciding to take Argentina from its debts, he said that "[...]there are two million Argentines who would economize even to their hunger and thirst to fulfill the promises of our public commitments in the foreign markets". He reduced the budget and applied a weak protectionism. The crisis was eventually fixed with the growing exports of refrigerated meat to Europe, a new developing industrial method of the time. A prolific writer, his works have been published in 12 volumes.

=== Economy and the crisis ===
The permanent budget deficit and the urgency of meeting payments on the public debt, incurred mainly during the Paraguayan War, led to the enactment, during Avellaneda's presidency at the beginning of 1875, of a Customs Law that increased import duties on industrial products by 40%. By the end of 1875, a crisis became evident, caused by the government's financial mismanagement and by the fall in raw-material prices on the world market. The National Bank was used to cover part of the national government's funding needs, but to do so it in turn had to resort to a loan taken from the Bank of the Province of Buenos Aires.

Finally, after unsuccessfully seeking other solutions, the president opted for a massive reduction in public spending, dismissing 6,000 public employees and cutting salaries by 15%. In a well-known speech, he declared that

There are two million Argentines who will economize even on their hunger and thirst, in order to respond, in a supreme situation, to the commitments of our public faith in foreign markets.

Not everyone agreed with that solution. There was a faction within autonomism—prominently including Dardo Rocha, Miguel Cané, Carlos Pellegrini and Vicente Fidel López—that, during successive parliamentary debates throughout 1875, proposed some form of protectionism to promote industrialization so that the country would cease depending on exports of primary products and imports of manufactured goods. After a period in which these proposals received some support in the press, they were eventually set aside as the crisis was gradually resolved. That solution was only partly due to government austerity: it was the rise in wool prices that reversed the trade deficit.

As soon as it became clear that the country was emerging from the crisis, the president proposed an Immigration and Colonization Law—the Avellaneda Law—which actively promoted immigration, previously a chaotic process. Under the law, immigrants were guaranteed accommodation at the port of arrival and at the point inland where they chose to settle, and were assisted in obtaining their first job. There was a new rise in the number of immigrants, who settled in agricultural colonies in Santa Fe, Entre Ríos and Córdoba—and even a few in Buenos Aires—in greater proportion than before.

In 1875 the first Buenos Aires Rural Exhibition was inaugurated, organized by the Argentine Rural Society, and it has continued to be held annually ever since.

In December 1876 the first refrigerated ship arrived in the country, Le Frigorifique, equipped with two chambers that maintained a temperature of 0 degrees Celsius. This significantly changed the outlook for Argentine exports, increased the value of cattle, and made possible the first shipment of frozen meat to Europe, followed the next year by the first grain exports. These activities would gradually grow until they became the two most important sectors of Argentine exports from the 1890s onward.

As a consequence of—and also a necessary condition for—that agricultural expansion, the extension of the railway network received a major boost during Avellaneda's government, reaching 2,516 kilometres by the end of his term, equivalent to an 89% increase in six years. The president himself inaugurated the line of the trans-Andean railway to San Miguel de Tucumán—begun during Sarmiento's presidency—and the two railways of Buenos Aires Province, the Western and the Southern, were extended. The branch line intended to reach Chile was also extended, reaching Villa Mercedes in San Luis.

=== Conciliation of the parties ===
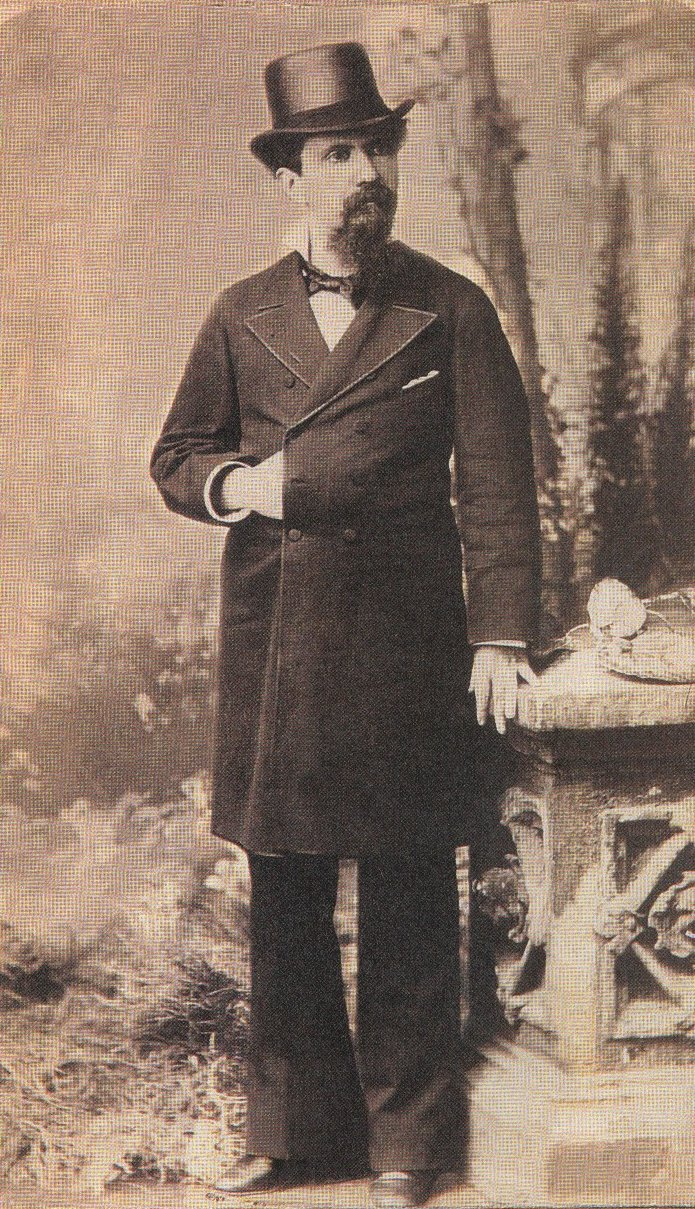
Nicolás Avellaneda.

When he assumed the presidency of Argentina, Avellaneda appointed a cabinet made up of four provincianos and one Porteño, Adolfo Alsina, who served as Minister of War.

In 1875, a mob of anticlericals and Freemasons looted and burned the Church of the Salvador, belonging to the Jesuits. It was a violent manifestation of growing anticlericalism among the upper social classes, partly provoked by the president's well-known Catholicism.

Also at the beginning of that year, gubernatorial elections were held in Buenos Aires, in which the Mitrists refused to participate. Instead, two sectors of autonomism confronted each other: one, backed by the president, put forward Carlos Casares, an estanciero inclined toward rapprochement with the Mitrists, who defeated the more radical sector, represented by Dardo Rocha, Aristóbulo del Valle and Leandro N. Alem.

Faced with the prospect of a permanent clash with the Mitrists, Avellaneda preferred to reach an agreement with them. He granted amnesty to the military leaders of the revolution of 1874, included names from that party on the autonomist lists for the elections of deputies, and in successive cabinet reshuffles preferred to appoint Mitre's friends. One of them, Saturnino Laspiur, was appointed Minister of the Interior. In the Buenos Aires elections of 1878, the Conciliation list brought to the governorship an autonomist very close to the Mitrists, Carlos Tejedor.

However, the death of Minister Alsina in January 1878 initiated the estrangement of the two parties. The president's intervention in favor of the governor of La Rioja—midway through that year—caused Laspiur's resignation, and the other Mitrists withdrew alongside him. Seeking to broaden his support, the president turned to Sarmiento, who successively served as Minister of the Interior and Minister of Foreign Affairs, but he eventually decided to rely exclusively on his own party and on the League of Governors; this officially became the National Autonomist Party. For his part, Mitre announced the official creation of the Nationalist Party. General Gainza and Governor Tejedor joined the Nationalist Party.

=== Conquest of the Desert ===
In 1867, Law 215 had been promulgated, ordering the national government to expand the southern frontier as far as the Río Negro; it could not be implemented because of the Paraguayan War.

The offensive against the indigenous peoples had to wait until 1872; when signs appeared that attacks on their tolderías were being planned, the principal cacique Calfucurá ordered the largest malón in history, which—in March of that year—attacked and looted much of central Buenos Aires Province. A rapid response by General Ignacio Rivas, with support from Ranquel allies, allowed a complete victory in the Battle of San Carlos de Bolívar.

From then on, aided by Calfucurá's death, the national government began a series of frontier advances, especially in western Buenos Aires. At the beginning of 1876, the caciques Juan José Catriel and Manuel Namuncurá—Calfucurá's son and successor—launched another major malón on the south of Buenos Aires Province.

Minister Alsina then launched an aggressive campaign to occupy the west of the province: throughout 1876 he advanced with five parallel columns against the principal indigenous forward settlements, occupying them. To prevent further incursions, he ordered the construction of the so-called Zanja de Alsina: a line of fortines linked by a trench 3.50 metres wide and 2.60 metres deep, which served as a boundary for unconquered territories over 374 km between Italó—in southern Córdoba—and Nueva Roma, a short distance from Bahía Blanca.

Without realizing it, by taking the western lagoons Alsina destroyed the foundations of indigenous prosperity, since the occupied lagoons were used to keep their horses fed and to fatten the cattle driven off in malones; on the other hand, in those years the indigenous population was struck by a smallpox epidemic that cost thousands of lives.

After Alsina's death, Avellaneda appointed General Julio Argentino Roca as his replacement, who had criticized Alsina's supposedly defensive stance. Unlike his predecessor, who had attempted to integrate the indigenous peoples into Western civilization, Roca maintained that the only solution to the threat they represented was their subjugation, expulsion, or elimination. These groups came from the Araucanía region and sought to steal cattle in order to sell them in Chile, which heightened the perception of danger and justified the harsh measures proposed by Roca. On the basis of that premise, he proposed a bill to occupy all indigenous territory as far as the Negro and Neuquén rivers within two years. The law was passed on 4 October 1878, granting 1,700,000 pesos to the project, when the plan was already underway.

Throughout 1878, successive offensives were launched against indigenous positions, causing hundreds of casualties among Namuncurá's forces and the capture of the feared Ranquel caciques Pincén, Catriel, and Epumer. Some 4,000 indigenous people—mostly women and children—were captured in these campaigns. In addition, the malones left a significant toll of kidnappings, with numerous settlers, especially women and children, taken captive by indigenous groups. The attacks resulted in the deaths of many citizens, defenders, and Tehuelches living peacefully in Patagonia, although exact figures vary by source. As for cattle theft, it is estimated that thousands of head were stolen during these raids, with each malón taking between 40,000 and 200,000 head of cattle.

On 11 October 1878, by means of Law 954, the Governorate of Patagonia was created, with its seat at Mercedes de Patagones, now Viedma, and Colonel Álvaro Barros as its first governor; its jurisdiction extended as far as Cape Horn.

In April 1879 the final attack was launched: five divisions totaling 6,000 men—including 820 allied indigenous troops—advanced in a fan formation toward the Negro River; Minister Roca celebrated on 25 May on Choele Choel Island. According to the Report presented by the Minister of War, 1,313 spear-bearing Indians were killed and 1,271 taken prisoner; five principal caciques were taken prisoner and one was killed; 10,513 de chusma Indians—women and children—were taken prisoner, and another 1,049 were reduced.

=== Revolution of 1880 ===
After the failure of the Conciliation, the Nationalists promoted Tejedor's presidential candidacy, which had the backing of Buenos Aires and some provincial support. After Alsina's death—the natural candidate of the autonomists—the only sufficiently prestigious figure in that party was General Roca, who was proposed as a candidate by his brother-in-law, Córdoba governor Miguel Juárez Celman, and in Buenos Aires by the physician Eduardo Wilde; he soon obtained the support of most of the governors.

Shortly beforehand, Avellaneda had proposed the federalization of the city of Buenos Aires as the definitive solution to the "capital question".

Large numbers of Porteños bought arms and formed a volunteer military force in the Tiro Federal, while Tejedor ordered the formation of provincial militias. Avellaneda responded by prohibiting by decree the creation of provincial volunteer armed corps.

After an aggressive Buenos Aires demonstration that came close to attacking the Casa Rosada, on 17 February Tejedor met with Avellaneda, who committed himself not to occupy the capital with the Army.

On 11 April the presidential elections were held, resulting in a broad victory for Roca's electors, except in Buenos Aires and Corrientes. Tejedor offered Roca that both should withdraw their respective candidacies, but Roca declined. The landing of 3,500 rifles and thousands of rounds of ammunition on the Riachuelo caused a shootout between Buenos Aires and national forces.

On 13 June, Avellaneda decreed the transfer of the federal government to the town of Belgrano as a provisional capital, and the Senate and part of the Chamber of Deputies moved there. That same day the electoral college met and elected General Roca president.

Four days later the fighting began; after two battles on the Riachuelo, the Buenos Aires forces managed to stop the national forces for a third time at the Corrales, but ended up withdrawing under the threat of a new attack.

Some 3,000 deaths had occurred, and Buenos Aires's situation was desperate: it had barely 4,000 men and the national forces were still advancing, so Tejedor commissioned Mitre to negotiate with the president. On 25 June an agreement was signed that included a broad amnesty, Tejedor's resignation, recognition of Roca's presidential election, and the federalization of Buenos Aires if Congress so decided. The militias were disarmed, and Tejedor resigned on the 30th.

=== Resolution of the capital question ===
On 24 August, President Avellaneda sent the bill to federalize the city of Buenos Aires, which was passed on 21 September.

On 12 October 1880, General Julio Argentino Roca assumed the presidency of the Nation, inaugurating the period of the Conservative Republic.

There still remained—according to the provisions of the constitutional reform of 1860—the approval of the federalization by the Buenos Aires legislature. It began debate on 12 November, with deputy, journalist, and poet José Hernández standing out in its defense, while the principal opponent was Leandro N. Alem, both autonomists. On 25 November the law was approved by a majority.

== Bibliography ==
- Mendelevich, Pablo (2010). El Final. Buenos Aires: Ediciones B. ISBN 978-987-627-166-0.

Political offices
Preceded by Domingo F. Sarmiento	President of Argentina; 1874–1880	Succeeded by Julio A. Roca
