= Battle of El Espinillo =

Coordinates: 32°57′9.22″S 60°36′7.01″W

- Part of the Argentine Revolution of 1893
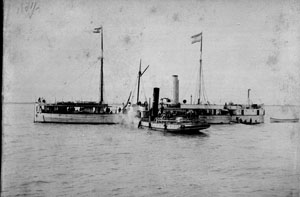
- Los Andes and an unidentified tug after the action
Date	29 September 1893
Location	Paraná River off Rosario
Result	Government victory

Belligerents
Argentina * Federal government	Argentina * Radical Civic Union

Commanders and leaders
Manuel José María Mansilla	Gerardo Vallotta

Strength
1 ironclad 1 torpedo boat	1 ironclad

Casualties and losses
None	1 Ironclad disabled
- 4 seamen (1 loyal, 3 rebels) killed in previous actions

The battle of El Espinillo was a naval engagement between warships of the Argentine Navy that took place during an insurrection on 29 September 1893 on the Paraná River, along El Espinillo Island, Entre Ríos, on the opposite bank from the city of Rosario, Santa Fe. The action was the result of a rebellion against the National Government led by the Radical Civic Union (UCR) party, known as the Argentine Revolution of 1893. It was the largest battle involving armoured naval units in Argentina.

== Background: Argentine Revolution of 1893 ==
The so-called Argentine Revolution of 1893 was a failed insurrection by members of the Radical Civic Union (UCR) against the government of Argentina, then controlled by the National Autonomist Party (PAN). The insurrection pursued the goals of the Revolution of the Park of 1890, whose intentions of ending corruption and electoral fraud were further echoed in the Revolution of 1905.

Luis Sáenz Peña took office after being elected president on 10 April, but the vote was overshadowed by the proscription of the UCR. The UCR split then into two factions led by Leandro N. Alem (los líricos, "the Lyricists") and by his nephew and protégé, Hipólito Yrigoyen (los rojos, "the Reds"). Alem was in favor of taking power through a coup d´ état, while Yrigoyen, who managed to promote his ally Aristóbulo del Valle to minister of defense, was confident that provincial rebellions could force the government to the bargaining table. Several uprisings erupted in different jurisdictions in July, instigated by the “Reds”. One of them, in Buenos Aires Province, was commanded by Yrigoyen himself. Del Valle took the chance to call to fresh elections, but his proposal was eventually defeated at the chamber of representatives. On 25 August, after the resignation of Del Valle, the National Committee of the UCR ordered their members to lay down weapons. After denouncing Yrigoyen's approachment as “appeasement” and “treason”, Alem and his followers, supported by Swiss-German and Italian settlers from farming communities, abetted a rebellion against the central government in Rosario, which broke out on 25 September.

== Preliminary maneuvers ==
As soon as news of the uprising in Rosario reached Buenos Aires, the ARA Los Andes, a monitor warship commanded by Captain Ramón Flores, departed from the port of Tigre bound for the province of Santa Fe with the purpose of transporting weapons for the forces loyal to the Government. On 26 September, while navigating the Paraná River, the ship's senior officers, led by Lieutenant Gerardo Vallotta, mutinied and arrested Captain Flores. Valotta and his followers joined the rebel cause and changed course towards Rosario, where they were to deliver the weapons to the insurgents. The aide-de-camp of Captain Flores was shot and killed in the melée.

Earlier that morning, a naval encounter had taken place north of Martin Garcia island, where the armoured cruiser 9 de Julio and the ironclad Almirante Brown put the torpedo boat Murature out of action and forced the armed launch N° 7 to seek shelter in Uruguay, with the loss of three from Murature's crew. The crew of the latter ships had been coopted by the UCR. Murature was captured by loyal forces. Colonel Mariano Espina, a veteran of the Conquest of the Desert who sided with Alem and was aboard the rebel warship, was arrested and sentenced to death, but the penalty was eventually commuted by President Saénz Peña. This was the first time that a civilian rebellion saw the Argentine Navy divided between loyals and rebels; UCR propaganda had eroded the trust between ratings and officers.

On the ground, meanwhile, a detachment of naval infantry beat off an ambush attempt by an armed group of Swiss settlers near the border between Santa Fe and Buenos Aires Province. Upon learning that the rebels had seized Los Andes, the National Government ordered the armoured ship ARA Independencia, under the command of Captain Manuel José María Mansilla, and the torpedo boat ARA Espora to immediately pursue the insurgent ship, which had already captured the aviso Gaviota and the tugboat Victoria R. Near the Tonelero pass, the sailors of the ARA Los Andes spotted the ships that were chasing them, managing to keep their vessels hidden. Some hours later, Victoria R, whose depleted coal reserves didn't allowed it to reach Rosario, was dispatched to Buenos Aires with a message for the Admiralty. The aviso Gaviota eventually slipped downriver during a squall off Rosario.

== Main naval action ==
After unloading part of her cargo at Rosario's port on 27 September, Los Andes, whose commander had received a message intimating that the government squadron was about to arrive in Rosario, sailed to a 14 feet (4.3 m) depth channel between two sandbars south of El Espinillo island, on the opposite bank of the river, where it held position without dropping anchors. The spot was chosen to exploit the draft and hinder Independencia's mobility. The battle began at 11:30., when Los Andes opened up on the torpedo boat Espora. The 9-in round fell 20 yards long. Espora, 4000 yards downriver, replied with its 75mm cannons, buying time for Independencia, which was following the torpedo boat 2000 yards behind, to put in action its main armament. When Independencia was within range, Captain Mansilla ordered to direct fire to the upper deck and bridge of Los Andes, in order to avoid the eventual sinking of the monitor. The use of torpedoes was ruled out for the same reason.

The Los Andes got support from rebel troops onshore, who exchanged light artillery and machine gun fire with the loyal flotilla. After 45 minutes of trading fire, a truce proposed by Mansilla was rejected by the rebels, with Valotta threatening to blow up his ship. At 12:30, a 240mm round pierced Los Andes armoured belt and exploded in the engine room, crippling the ship. Repeatedly hit, taking water and with its speed reduced, the monitor was forced to seek shelter among the cargo vessels at anchor in Rosario's port. At this point it became clear that the rebel monitor was largely out of action. A skeleton crew was left on board, while most of the complement landed and set up an artillery battery armed with two 75mm Krupp guns. Mansilla sent an ultimatum to the rebels: if the monitor do not submit to the government and the rebellious forces in Rosario do not lay down their weapons by 18:00, the Los Andes would be finished off and the city bombarded. After long negotiations, which extended the deadline until the first hours of 30 September, the rebels finally gave up. The monitor was towed to the area where Independencia was at anchor and handed over to a boarding party. Due to the extensive damage, Los Andes had to be grounded to avoid its sinking; the vessel was used as an improvised hospital vessel pending repairs.

== Aftermath ==
With the defeat of Los Andes the uprising lost steam, and, after talks between Vallota and Alem, UCR flags were lowered and Rosario surrendered to government forces. The rebel troops melted down, and Alem was put under arrest. A division of the Argentine army took control of the city on 1 October. President Sáenz Peña, who perceived his own political isolation during the crisis, was in one hand unable to overcome the pressure of the electoral advances of the UCR, while in the other hand the growing influence of Roca in his government made his position untenable. He eventually resigned in January 1895. Julio Argentino Roca, who was appointed commander-in-chief of the federal forces in the province of Santa Fe, praised the intervention of the Navy in a letter sent to Emilio Mitre, highlighting the engagement between armoured units as a groundbreaking naval action that showcased the revolutionary capabilities of this new ship design, only comparable to those involving the Peruvian ironclad Huascar.

== See also ==
- Battle of Pacocha
- Battle of Iquique
- Battle of Angamos

== Bibliography ==
- Alonso, Paula (2000). Between Revolution and the Ballot Box: The Origins of the Argentine Radical Party in the 1890s. Cambridge University Press. ISBN 978-0-521-77185-6.
- Guido, Horacio J. (1988). Secuelas del unicato. Memorial de la Patria. La Bastilla.
- Ruiz Moreno, Isidoro (1998) La Marina Revolucionaria (1874–1963). Planeta. ISBN 9507429174

[[Category:Naval battles involving Argentina]]
