= ARA Libertad (1892) =

1892 Libertad-class coastal battleship

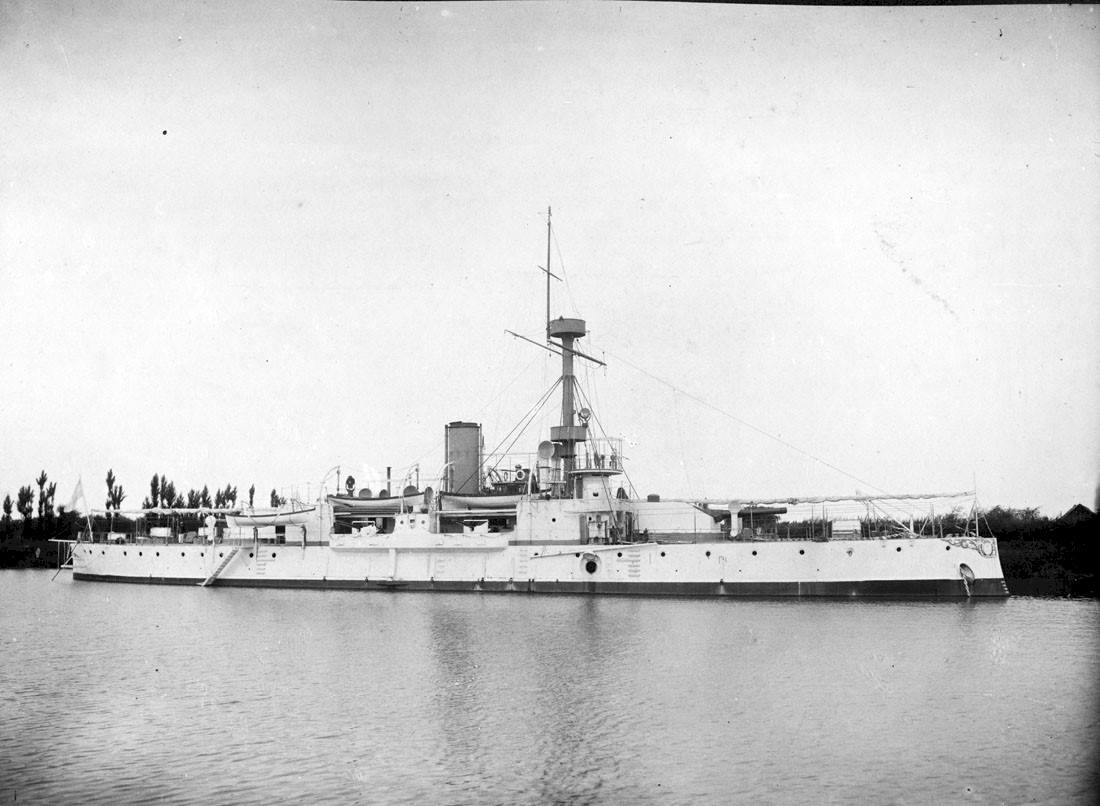
- Libertad circa 1893

History

Argentina
- Name: Libertad
- Namesake: Libertad, the Spanish word for "freedom"
- Ordered: 1889
- Builder: Laird Brothers, Birkenhead, United Kingdom
- Laid down: 1890
- Launched: 1892
- Completed: 1892
- Commissioned: 26 November 1892
- Decommissioned: 1947 (Navy) 1968 (Coast Guard)
- Fate: Scrapped

General characteristics
- Type: Coastal defense ship
- Displacement: 2336 tons
- Length: 73.15 m (240.0 ft)
- Beam: 13.55 m (44.5 ft)
- Draft: 3.96 m (13.0 ft)
- Propulsion: 2-shaft, 2 Vertical Compound steam engines, 3,000 ihp (2,200 kW), 4 boilers, 340 tons coal (maximum)
- Speed: 11 knots (13 mph; 20 km/h)
- Range: 3000 nautical miles @ 10kn
- Complement: 225
- Armament: 2 × 240-millimetre (9 in) Krupp guns; 4 × 120 mm (4.7 in) Elswick guns; 4 × 47 mm (1.9 in) Nordenfelt QF guns; 4 × 25 mm (0.98 in) Nordenfelt guns; 4 × 457 mm (18.0 in) Whitehead torpedo tubes
- Armour: Deck: 50 mm (2.0 in); Belt: 200 mm (7.9 in); Main gun shields: 125 mm (4.9 in); Barbettes: 200 mm (7.9 in); Conning tower: 100 mm (3.9 in)

ARA Libertad was a coastal defense ship that served in the Argentine Navy between 1892 and 1947, and with the Argentine Coast Guard as a pilot station ship from 1947 to 1968. It was the seventh Argentine naval ship with this name.

== Design ==
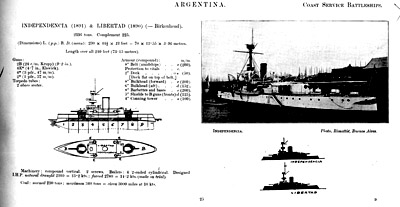
ARA Libertad details in Jane's 1902 edition

Libertad was a coastal defense ship designed mainly for coastal and riverine use, being classified by the Argentine Navy as "Riverine Battleship" (Spanish: Acorazado de Río); in the 1902 edition of Jane's Fighting Ships it was listed as "Coast Service Battleship".

The ship was 73.15 metres (240 ft) long overall and 70.10 metres (230 ft) between perpendiculars, with a beam of 13.11 metres (43 ft) and a draft of 3.96 metres (13 ft). Displacement was 2,370 tonnes (2,330 long tons). It had a steel hull subdivided by transverse and longitudinal bulkheads, with a ram at its bow. A 203 millimetres (8 in) thick armoured belt of compound armour, backed by 229 millimetres (9 in) of teak ran over two-thirds of the ship's length. The belt was 1.52 metres (5 ft) deep, with its upper edge just above the waterline. Armoured transverse bulkheads were at the fore and aft end of the belt, with the forward bulkhead being 203 millimetres (8 in) thick and the aft bulkhead 152 millimetres (6 in). An armoured deck ran the length of the ship, and was 25 millimetres (1 in) thick over the belt and 51 millimetres (2 in) thick at the ends of the ship. The ship's conning tower was protected by 102 millimetres (4 in) of armour, while the main guns were protected by 203–127 millimetres (8–5 in) thick barbettes topped by a 127 millimetres (5 in) armoured hood.44 millimetres (1 3/4 in) thick gunshields were fitted to the ship's secondary armament.

The ship was propelled by two four-cylinder vertical compound steam engines, rated at 2,070 kilowatts (2,780 ihp), fed by steam from four cylindrical boilers. This gave a speed of 14.2 knots (26.3 km/h; 16.3 mph). The ship had a single mast and funnel. The mast differed slightly from the one in its sister Independencia.

As designed, its main battery had two 240mm Krupp guns (one at the bow and the other at the stern) on Vavasseur mountings protected with armoured shields, and two quick-firing 120mm Elswick guns on each side. The secondary battery had four 47 mm quick-firing Nordenfelt/Hotchkiss guns, and two 25mm Nordenfelt guns.

== History ==
In July 1889, the Argentine Naval Commission in London signed a contract with the shipyard Cammell Laird of Birkenhead ordering the construction of "two twin-shaft, ram-equipped battleships for riverine service" (Spanish: dos acorazados de espolón de doble hélice para servicio de ríos) at a unit cost of £ 176.000; this transaction was approved in September of that year by the Ministry.

The first ship, then known as Nueve de Julio and later renamed Libertad when a new cruiser was assigned that name, started construction in 1890 and was launched in 1892; its construction was completed that year. After finalizing trials, in November 1892 the ship was formally accepted by the Argentine Navy, under command of Captain Atilio Barilari. It departed Liverpool on 20 December 1892 and arrived at Buenos Aires on 25 January 1893.

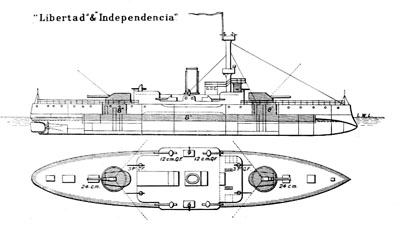
Side and top views of ARA Libertad in Brassey's 1899 edition

In mid-1894 the ship participated in the naval exercises as part of the 1st Division; later that year it joined its sister ship, Independencia, and the ironclad Almirante Brown.

In 1905 it was assigned to the hydrographic survey of the Río de la Plata (English: River Plate); after that it was reassigned to the Training Division. In 1914, Libertad was assigned to train the crews for the new dreadnought battleships being built in the United States (Rivadavia and Moreno). In 1915 the ship was reclassified as a "coast guard ship". In 1918–19 Libertad was maintained in reserve, and by 1922–23 was assigned as training ship. In 1924-25 the ship was again in reserve, being upgraded to use oil fuel rather than coal. In 1927 Libertad was reclassified as a gunboat, and was assigned to the Gunboat Division in 1930.

In December 1946 Libertad was discharged from the Argentine Navy (decree 22.556) and in 1947 transferred to the Coast Guard, to be used as station ship for pilots in the River Plate. In 1968 the ship was discharged from the Argentine Coast Guard.

== See also ==
- List of ships of the Argentine Navy
