= ARA Independencia =

Several ships of the Argentine Navy have been named Independencia honoring Argentina's Declaration of Independence from Spain in 1816:

- Independencia (1812), a schooner that served during the Independence War
- Independencia (1826), a brig of war lost in the Cisplatine War in 1827
- ARA Independencia (1891), a Libertad-class coastal battleship, launched in 1891, commissioned in 1893, and decommissioned in 1946
- ARA Independencia (V-1), a Colossus-class light aircraft carrier, the former HMS Warrior (R31), commissioned into the Argentine Navy in 1959, decommissioned in 1970, and scrapped in 1971
