= ARA Independencia (1891) =

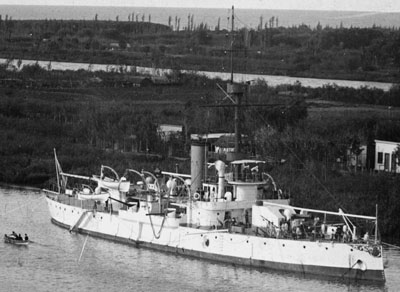
- Independencia

History

Argentina
- Name: Independencia
- Namesake: Independencia, the Spanish word for "independence".
- Ordered: 1889
- Builder: Laird Brothers, Birkenhead, United Kingdom
- Laid down: 15 March 1890
- Launched: 26 February 1891
- Completed: 5 March 1892
- Commissioned: 1893
- Decommissioned: 1946 (Navy) 1968 (Coast Guard)
- Out of service: 1948 (Navy)
- Fate: Scrapped

General characteristics
- Type: Coastal defense ship
- Displacement: 2336 tons
- Length: 73.15 m (240.0 ft)
- Beam: 13.55 m (44.5 ft)
- Draft: 3.96 m (13.0 ft)
- Propulsion: 2-shaft, 2 Vertical Compound steam engines, 3,000 ihp (2,200 kW), 4 boilers, 340 tons coal (maximum)
- Speed: 11 knots (13 mph; 20 km/h)
- Range: 3000 nautical miles @ 10kn
- Complement: 160
- Armament: 2 × 240-millimetre (9.4 in) Krupp guns; 4 × 120 mm (4.7 in) Elswick guns; 4 × 47 mm (1.9 in) Nordenfelt QF guns; 4 × 25 mm (0.98 in) Nordenfelt guns; 4 × 457 mm (18.0 in) Whitehead torpedo tubes
- Armour: Deck: 50 mm (2.0 in); Belt: 200 mm (7.9 in); Main gun shields: 125 mm (4.9 in); Barbettes: 200 mm (7.9 in); Conning tower: 100 mm (3.9 in)

ARA Independencia was a coastal defense ship that served in the Argentine Navy between 1893 and 1948, and with the Argentine Coast Guard as a pilot station ship from 1949 to 1968. It was one of nine Argentine naval ships bearing this name.

== Design ==
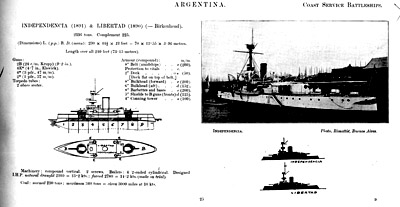
ARA Independencia details in Jane's 1902 edition

Independencia was a coastal defense ship designed mainly for coastal and riverine use, being classified by the Argentine Navy as "Riverine Battleship" (Spanish: Acorazado de Río); in the 1902 edition of Jane's Fighting Ships it was listed as "Coast Service Battleship".

It had a steel hull with six bulkheads and a ram at its bow, an armoured belt over two-thirds of its length, an armoured deck, and an armoured conning tower. It was propelled by two vertical compound steam engines, and had a single mast and funnel. The mast differed slightly from the one in its sister Libertad.

As designed, its main battery had two 240mm Krupp guns (one at the bow and the other at the stern) on Vavasseur mountings protected with armoured shields, and two quick-firing 120mm Elswick guns on each side. The secondary battery had four 47 mm quick-firing Nordenfelt/Hotchkiss guns, and two 25mm Nordenfelt guns.

== History ==
In July 1889, the Argentine Naval Commission in London signed a contract with the shipyard Cammell Laird of Birkenhead ordering the construction of "two twin-shaft, ram-equipped battleships for riverine service" (Spanish: "dos acorazados de espolón de doble hélice para servicio de ríos") at a unit cost of £ 176.000; this transaction was later approved in September of that year by the Ministry.

The second ship, named Independencia, started construction in 1890 and was launched in 1891; her construction was completed in 1892–3. In April 1893 she was formally accepted by the Argentine Navy, under command of Captain Edelmiro Correa. Independencia departed Liverpool on 29 June, arriving in Buenos Aires on 31 July 1893.

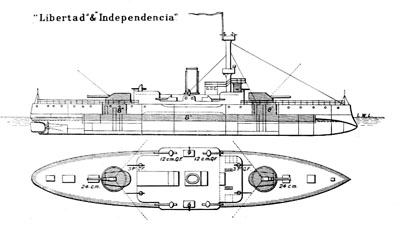
Side and top views of Independencia in Brassey's 1899 edition

Independencia participated in the suppression of the Radical uprising of 1893. In August 1893 she was ordered to La Plata where her crew contributed to maintaining public order. On 27 September she participated in the naval battle of El Espinillo against the monitor Los Andes, which supported the revolutionaries. Independencia ‘s heavy main battery badly damaged the rebel ship, forcing it to surrender; while she didn’t suffer damage.

In mid-1894 Independencia participated in the naval exercises as part of the 1st Division; later that year she joined her sister ship, Libertad, and the ironclad Almirante Brown.

Between 1904 and late 1909, Independencia was assigned to the Training Division (Spanish: "División Instrucción"). In 1915 she was reclassified as "coast guard ship". In 1917-19 she was assigned to the Hydrographic Service, to perform survey tasks; in 1921-22 was assigned as training ship. In 1923-26 was put in reserve, being upgraded to use petrol instead of coal. In 1927 she was reclassified as "gunboat", and in 1929 assisted the rescue of Monte Cervantes crew and passengers when the latter was wrecked near Ushuaia. She was assigned to the Gunboat Division in 1930.

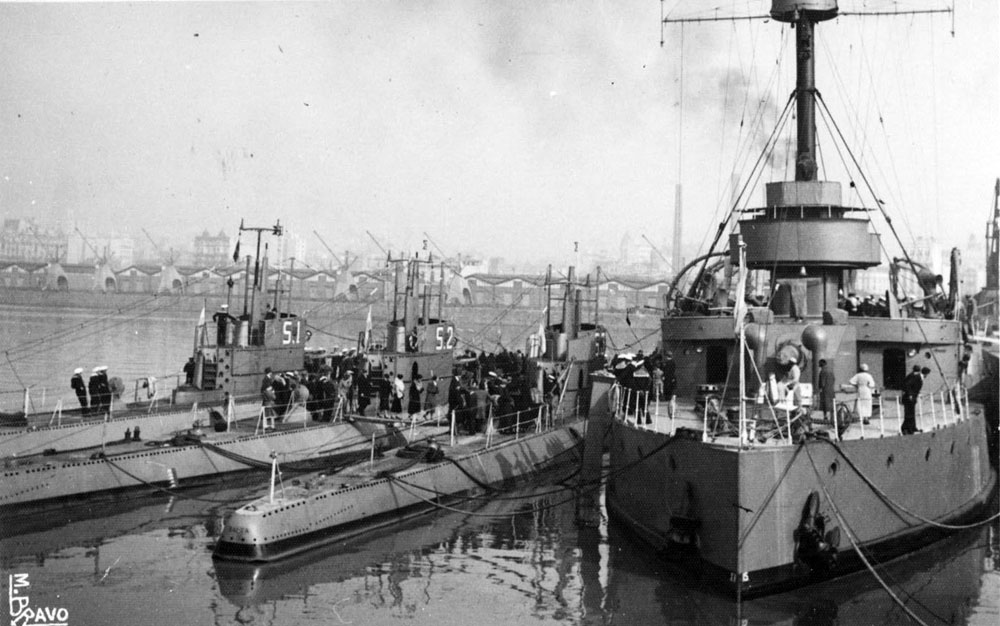
Independencia with Santa Fe class submarines, Mar del Plata, circa 1947.

In December 1946 Independencia was discharged from the Argentine Navy (decree 22.556); however remained in use as submarine tender during 1947–48 at the Mar del Plata naval base. In 1949 she was transferred to the Coast Guard, to be used as station ship for pilots in the Río de la Plata (English: River Plate). In 1968 she was discharged from the Argentine Coast Guard, and was sold for scrapping in 1969.

== See also ==
- List of ships of the Argentine Navy
