= Argentine Navy =

Naval warfare branch of Argentina

Navy of the Argentine Republic
- Armada de la República Argentina
- Shield, the red Phrygian cap symbolizing pursuit of liberty
- Founded: 25 May 1810; 216 years ago
- Country: Argentina
- Branch: Navy
- Size: 18,368 (2018)
- Part of: Argentine Armed Forces
- Main Base: Puerto Belgrano Naval Base
- Colors: Light blue and white
- March: Navy March
- Anniversaries: 17 May (Navy Day)
- Fleet: 3 destroyers 5 corvettes 11 patrol boats 1 amphibious warfare ship 19 auxiliary ships
- Engagements: Argentine War of Independence; Argentine Civil Wars; Argentine invasion of Monterey; Thomas Cochrane campaign; Liberating Expedition of Peru; Cisplatine War; Uruguayan Civil War; Anglo-French blockade of the Río de la Plata; Uruguayan War; Paraguayan War; Battle of El Espinillo; Revolución Libertadora; 1963 Argentine Navy revolt; Cuban Missile Crisis; Falklands War; Gulf War; Operation Uphold Democracy
- Website: argentina.gob.ar/armada

Commanders
- Commander-in-chief: President Javier Milei
- Chief of General Staff: Admiral Juan Carlos Romay
- Deputy Chief of General Staff: Vice Admiral Fernando Daniel Terribile

Insignia
- Jack

- Ensign

Aircraft flown
- Attack: AS-555 Fennec
- Patrol: P-3C/N Orion (started service entry in 2024/25); BE-200 Cormorán
- Trainer: T-34 Mentor
- Transport: PC-6 Porter; SH-3 Sea King

The Argentine Navy (ARA; Spanish: Armada de la República Argentina) (Note: . This forms the basis for the navy's ship prefix "ARA".) is the navy of Argentina. It is one of the three branches of the Armed Forces of the Argentine Republic, together with the Army and the Air Force.

The Argentine Navy day is celebrated on 17 May, the anniversary of their victory at the Battle of Buceo over the Spanish fleet during the Argentine War of Independence.

== History ==
=== 1810–1909 ===
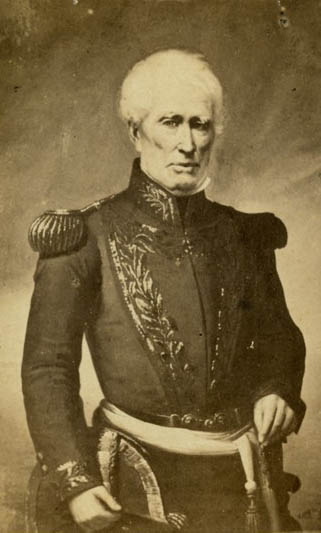
Admiral William Brown, founder of the Argentine Navy

The Argentine Navy was created in the aftermath of the May Revolution of 25 May 1810, which started the war for independence from Spain. The navy was first created to support Manuel Belgrano in the Paraguay campaign, but those ships were sunk by ships from Montevideo, and did not take part in that conflict. Renewed conflicts with Montevideo led to the creation of a second fleet, which participated in the capture of the city. As Buenos Aires had little maritime history, most men in the navy were from other nations, such as the Irish-born admiral William Brown, who directed the operation. As the cost of maintaining a navy was too high, most of the Argentine naval forces were composed of privateers.

Brown led the Argentine navy in further naval conflicts at the War with Brazil and the Anglo-French blockade of the Río de la Plata.

In the 1870s the Argentine Navy began modernizing itself. At the close of the century, the force included:

- 5 armoured cruisers
- 4 coastal defence ironclads
- 3 second-class, high-speed, British-built cruisers
- 7 modern small cruisers and gunboats
- 4 destroyers
- 22 torpedo boats

The most powerful ships at this time included the Italian-built Garibaldi and her sister ships: General Belgrano, Pueyrredón, and San Martín, each at over 6,000 tons. Three older ironclads, Almirante Brown, Independencia, and Libertad dated from the 1880s and early 1890s.

The navy's ships were built primarily in Italy, Britain, France, and Spain, and were operated by over 600 officers and 7,760 seamen. These were supported by a battalion of marines and an artillery battery.

=== 1910–1982 ===
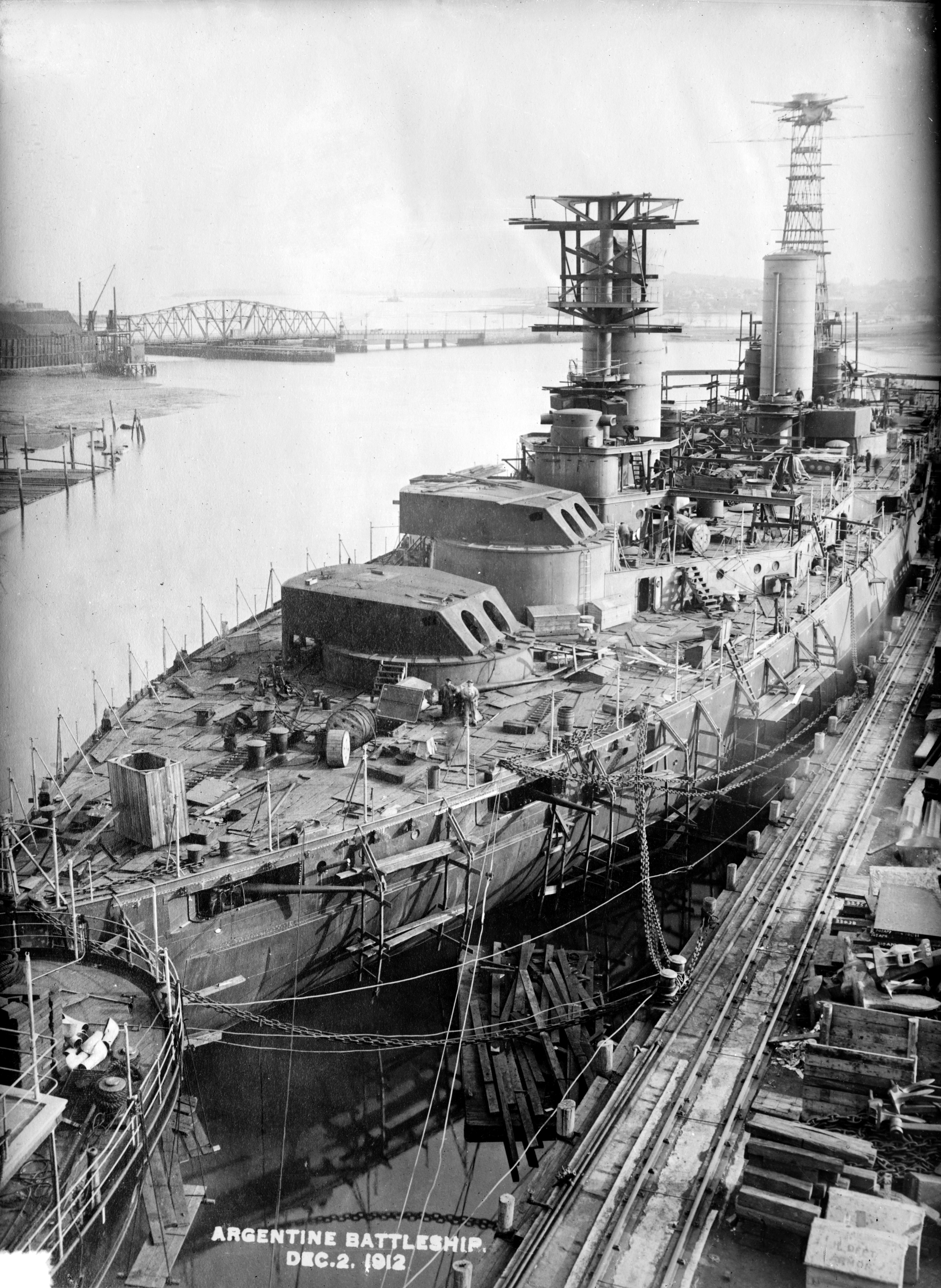
Rivadavia-class battleship under construction in the US for the Argentine Navy. Photo taken in 1912. Two ships of this class entered service in 1914–1915 and served until 1956.

A naval arms race between Argentina, Brazil and Chile, the most powerful and wealthy countries in South America, began when the Brazilian government ordered three dreadnoughts. The first, Minas Geraes, was commissioned into the Brazilian Navy in 1910.

For most of both world wars, Argentina was neutral, only declaring war on the Axis in March 1945. In 1940, Argentina's navy was ranked the eighth most powerful in the world (after the European powers, Japan, and the United States) and the largest in Latin America. A ten-year building programme costing $60 million had produced a force of 14,500 sailors and over a thousand officers. The fleet included two First World War-era (but modernized) American-built Rivadavia-class battleships, three modern cruisers, a dozen British-built destroyers, and three submarines, plus minelayers, minesweepers, coastal defence ships, and gunboats. A naval air force was also in operation.

In the postwar period, Naval Aviation and Marine units were put under direct Navy command. With Brazil, Argentina is one of two South American countries to have operated two aircraft carriers: the ARA Independencia and ARA Veinticinco de Mayo.

The Argentine Navy has been traditionally heavily involved in fishery protection, helping the Coast Guard: most notably in 1966 a destroyer fired on and holed a Soviet trawler that had refused to be escorted to Mar del Plata, in the 1970s there were four more incidents with Soviet and Bulgarian ships followed by other incidents such as the sinking of the Chian-der 3.

The Navy also took part in all military coups in Argentina through the 20th century. During the 1976 to 1983 dictatorship, Navy personnel were involved in the Dirty War in which thousands of people were kidnapped, tortured and killed by the forces of the military junta, similar to practices which are now known as enforced disappearance. The Navy School of Mechanics, known as ESMA, was a notorious centre for torture. Among their more well-known victims were the Swedish teenager Dagmar Hagelin, and French nuns Alice Domon and Léonie Duquet (In October 2007 the Argentine Navy formally handed possession of the school to human rights groups to turn it into a memorial museum).

During this regime, the Navy was also the main supporter of a military solution for the country's two longest-standing disputes: the Beagle Conflict with Chile and the Falkland Islands (Spanish: Islas Malvinas) with the United Kingdom.

=== Falklands War, 1982 ===
During the 1982 Falklands War the main Argentine naval fleet consisted of modernised World War II era ships (one GUPPY-type submarine, one British-built Colossus-class carrier, a cruiser, and four destroyers), and newer vessels including two Type 42 destroyers, three French-built corvettes, and one German-built Type 209 submarine. This fleet was supported by several ELMA tankers and transports, as well as an ice breaker and a polar transport ship.

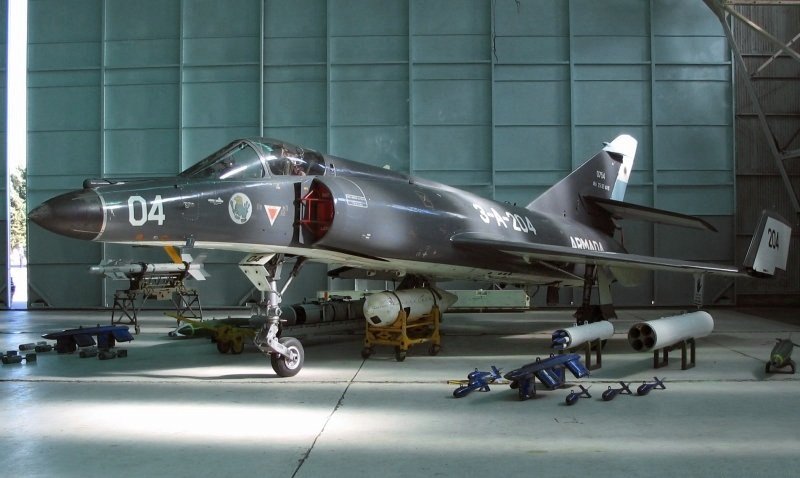
Super Étendard, the Exocet platform.

New German MEKO type destroyers, corvettes, and Thyssen-Nordseewerke (Type TR-1700) submarines were still under construction at the time.

After leading the invasion of the Falkland Islands, the Argentine fleet played only a small part in the later conflict. After nuclear submarine HMS Conqueror sank cruiser ARA General Belgrano, the Argentine surface fleet did not venture from a 12-mile (22.2 km) coastal limit imposed by the British.

The Argentine Navy's contribution to the war was principally the initial amphibious assaults on 2 and 3 April on Port Stanley and Grytviken; naval aviation Super Étendards armed with Exocet missiles, which sank the destroyer HMS Sheffield and the container ship Atlantic Conveyor; Skyhawks, which dealt the fatal blow to the frigate HMS Ardent (F184), previously disabled by Argentine Air Force aircraft; and the Marines, with the 5th Marine Corps Battalion defending Mount Tumbledown. In addition, the Type 42 destroyer ARA Santísima Trinidad, operating off Isla de los Estados, played an important part in the destruction of the British troopship Sir Galahad on 8 June. An Aermacchi MB-339 armed trainer, based at Port Stanley, was the first Argentine aircraft to spot the British landings at San Carlos Bay on 21 May; the pilot, Lieutenant Owen Crippa, identified HMS Argonaut as a target of opportunity and fired cannon bursts and rockets, causing damage to the frigate. Crippa was awarded the Cross for Heroic Valour in Combat. A land-based Exocet battery outside Port Stanley scored a direct hit on the destroyer HMS Glamorgan on 11 June, inflicting major damage and killing 14 of her crew. A Marine Tigercat SAM put a Royal Air Force Harrier (XW 919) out of action on 12 June. Naval aviation also carried out intensive maritime patrols, searching to locate the British fleet for the strike aircraft and British submarines for the anti-submarine Sea King helicopters, while their Lockheed L-188 Electra and Fokker F-28 Fellowship transports reinforced the Port Stanley garrison and evacuated the wounded.

The submarine ARA San Luis also played a strategic role, engaging the frigate HMS Arrow on 10 May, According to British sources, the torpedo presumably hit a decoy. The submarine ARA Santa Fe landed a group of naval commandos who secured the beachhead at Yorke Bay for the landing of the main Argentine force on 2 April. After a successful resupply mission, she was attacked by helicopters and disabled off South Georgia, where her crew then surrendered along with the Argentine detachment at Grytviken. Santa Fe was later scuttled by the British.

Operating in the waters around the islands, patrol boats from the Argentine Naval Prefecture, naval transports, freighters from the Argentine merchant navy and smaller coasters, more of them confiscated to the Falklands Island Company, struggled to keep the supply lines between the different Argentine garrisons open. Most of these vessels were eventually sunk or disabled by British naval and aerial forces. On 1 May, the armed coaster ARA Forrest and the patrol boat Islas Malvinas were engaged by a Sea Lynx helicopter from HMS Alacrity while on a reconnaissance mission north of Port Stanley; Islas Malvinas was damaged and limped away, but Forrest returned fire and damaged the British helicopter. The same Alacrity sank transport ARA Isla de los Estados on the night of 10 May in the Falklands Sound, while the freighter Rio Carcarañá was disabled by Sea Harrier aircraft on 15 May at Port King, in the western shores of Lafonia, and eventually sank. ARA Bahía Buen Suceso was lost when she grounded off Fox Bay after another air attack. In the early hours of 23 May a Royal Navy attempt to capture the coaster ARA Monsunen west of Lively Island was thwarted when the crew beached the vessel at Seal Cove after repelling the attack of a Sea Lynx helicopter and the frigates HMS Brilliant and HMS Yarmouth. Monsunen was towed to Goose Green by ARA Forrest, which unloaded her cargo and completed Monsunen's resupply mission. The small ketch ARA Penelope was one of the last coastal ships to reach Port Stanley with fuel oil drums from Fox Bay on 2 June.

=== Aftermath of the Falklands War ===
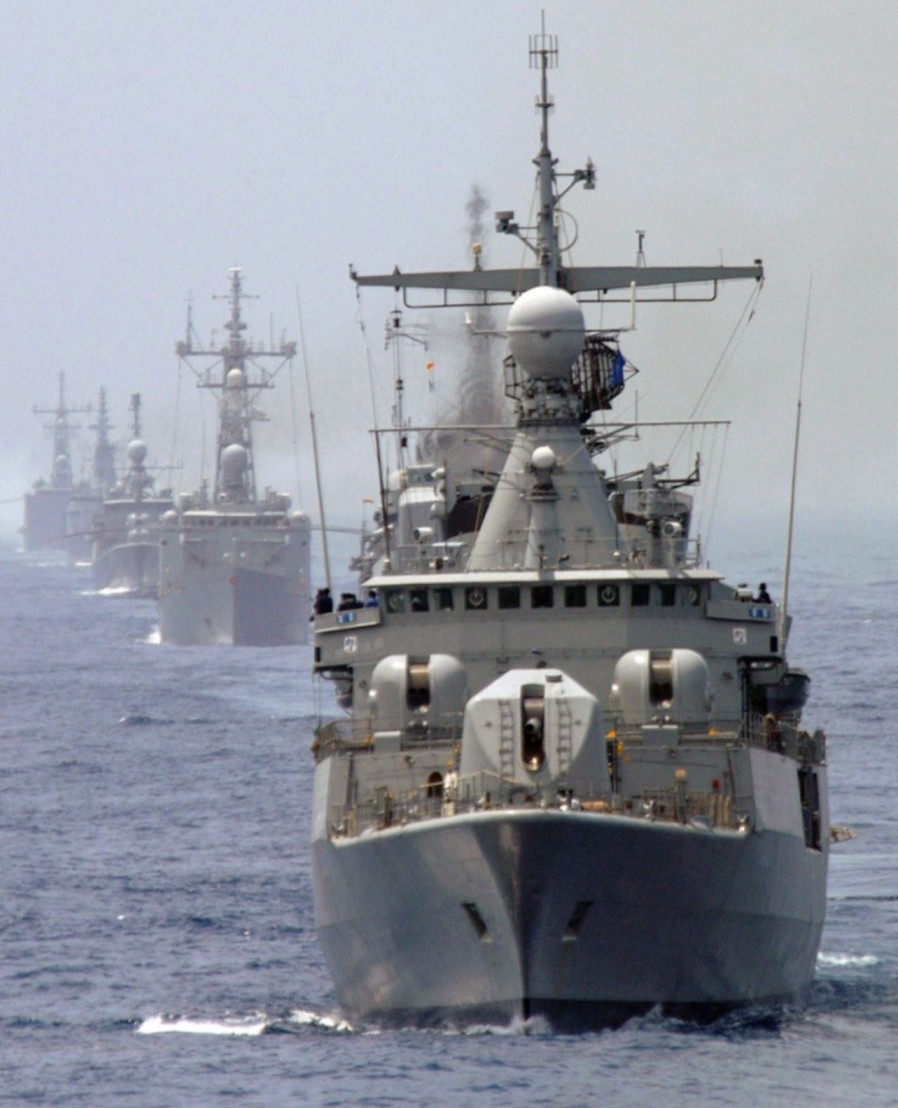
ARA Almirante Brown Meko 360 class destroyer.

The core of the fleet was reformed with the retirement of all the World War II-era Fletcher and Gearing-class destroyers and their replacement with the MEKO 360 and 140 classes designed by the German shipyard Blohm + Voss.

Also, the submarine force greatly reinforced its assets with the introduction of the Thyssen-Nordseewerke (TR-1700) class. Although the original programme called for six units with the last four to be built in Argentina, only the two built in Germany were delivered.

The amphibious force was drastically affected with the retirement of their only LST landing ship ARA Cabo San Antonio and replacement by a modified cargo vessel, the ARA Bahía San Blas. This situation was expected to improve in 2006 with the delivery by France of the first of the LPD Ouragan-class landing platform docks but the whole operation was placed on hold by the Argentine Government due to asbestos concerns. In 2010 France offered the Foudre (L9011) instead.

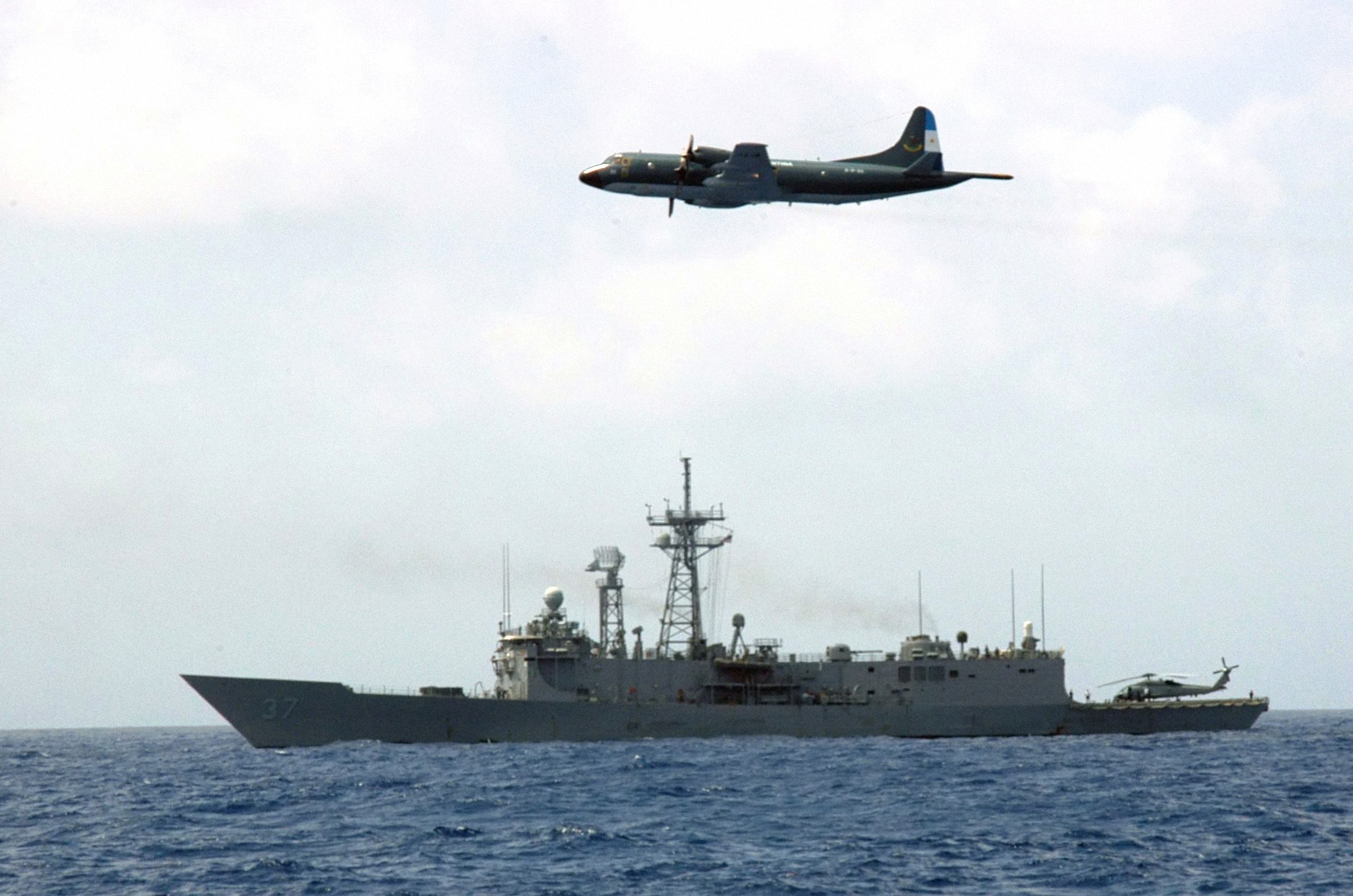
A US guided missile frigate and an Argentine maritime patrol aircraft during joint operations in Panama.

France also transferred the Durance (A629), now ARA Patagonia (B-1), multi-product replenishment ship (AOR).

In 1988 the A-4 Skyhawk aircraft were withdrawn, leaving the Super Étendard as the only fighter jets in the navy inventory. The already-paid-for A-4Hs bought in Israel as their replacement could not be delivered due to the embargo imposed by the United States after the war. Instead IAI used the money to refurbish the S-2E Trackers to the S-2T Turbo Tracker variant currently in service.

In the 1990s, the embargo was lifted and the Lockheed L-188 Electras (civilian aircraft converted for maritime patrol) were finally retired and replaced with similar P-3B Orions and civilian Beechcraft King Air Model 200 were locally converted to the MP variant.

In 2000 the aircraft carrier ARA Veinticinco de Mayo was decommissioned without replacement, although the navy continued to maintain her fixed wing air group of Super Étendard jets and S-2 Trackers. In an effort to maintain carrier qualifications, this air group would routinely operate from the Brazilian Navy aircraft carrier São Paulo and conduct joint exercises with United States Navy carriers whenever they were in transit in the south Atlantic during Gringo-Gaucho manoeuvers.

=== Gulf War and nineties ===
Argentina was the only Latin American country to participate in the 1991 Gulf War, sending a destroyer and a corvette in a first deployment and a supply ship and another corvette later to participate in the United Nations blockade and sea control effort in the Persian Gulf. Operación Alfil ("English: Operation [Chess] Bishop"), as it was known, carried out more than 700 interceptions and sailed 25,000 miles in the operations theatre.

From 1990 to 1992, the Baradero-class patrol boats were deployed under UN mandate ONUCA to the Gulf of Fonseca in Central America. In 1994, the three Drummond-class corvettes participated in Operation Uphold Democracy in Haiti.

=== 21st century ===
In 2003, for the first time, the Argentine Navy (classified as major non-NATO ally) interoperated with a United States Navy battle group when the destroyer ARA Sarandí (D-13) joined the USS Enterprise Carrier Strike Group and Destroyer Squadron 18 as a part of Exercise Solid Step during their tour in the Mediterranean Sea.

In 2010 the construction of four 1,800 ton offshore patrol ships was announced, but never started. Instead, Argentina ultimately opted to acquire four Gowind-class offshore patrol vessels from France. The decision was motivated by the meeting between Argentine President Mauricio Macri and French President Emmanuel Macron at the annual World Economic Forum summit in Davos, Switzerland in 2018. In November 2018, Argentina confirmed the purchase of the patrol vessels. The purchase included the already-built L'Adroit, which in 2016 visited the region on a marketing trip, as well as three new-build vessels. Following their construction in France, all four ships had been delivered to Argentina by 2022.

In October 2012 the Navy's sail training ship ARA Libertad was seized under court order in Ghana by creditors of Argentina's debt default in 2002. On 15 December 2012 the UN International Tribunal for the Law of the Sea ruled unanimously that the ship had immunity as a military vessel, and ordered that "Ghana should forthwith and unconditionally release the frigate ARA Libertad" Four days later Libertad was released from Tema and arrived to the port of Mar del Plata on 9 January 2013.

The Argentine Navy is under-funded and struggling to meet maintenance and training requirements; as a result, only 15 of its 42 vessels are in a condition to sail. The 2013 defence budget allowed for the 15 operational vessels to each spend less than 11 days at sea, while the submarines averaged just over 6 hours submerged in the whole of 2012. ARA Espora spent 73 days in late 2012 stranded in South Africa for lack of spares. The Almirante Brown-class destroyers are short of spares and their ordnance has expired, while the Antarctic patrol ship ARA Almirante Irizar had been under repair for 10 years because of a fire. On 23 January 2013 the Type 42 destroyer ARA Santísima Trinidad sank at her moorings after having been mothballed for ten years.

The Argentine Navy participates in joint exercises with other friendly navies including Brazil, United States, Spain, France, Canada, South Africa, Italy, Uruguay, and, since the 1990s, Chile. The exercises are routinely held to develop a common operational doctrine. Every year the Argentine and Chilean Navies participate in the Patrulla Antártica Naval Combinada (English: Joint Antarctic Naval Patrol) to guarantee safety to all tourist and scientific ships in transit within the Antarctic Peninsula, where the Navy is also directly responsible for maintaining the Argentine bases there.

==== San Juan Disaster and Submarine Fleet Renewal Problem ====
On 15 November 2017, the submarine ARA San Juan (S-42) stopped communications during a routine transit to port following a military exercise. A search was launched by ISMERLO, however after 15 days of searching the Argentine Navy declared the end of the rescue operation, and solely focused on the recovery of the submarine—not the crew. 44 personnel were onboard when the submarine disappeared. The final report made by Argentine congressmen stated that president Mauricio Macri and his defence minister had political responsibilities for the loss of ARA San Juan. Lack of funding for maintenance and personnel training had been identified as a chronic problem for the submarine service. After the San Juan disaster, the submarine service no longer maintained any active vessels.

In 2019, the governments of Brazil and Argentina were working on a transfer deal of the four Tupi IKL209/1400 submarines currently operated by the Brazilian Navy. Two of the Brazilian submarines are currently non operational pending repairs, the other two are still active pending their replacement by the 4 Scorpene type submarines currently under construction. However, in the early 2000s they had been upgraded with new combat systems by Lockheed Martin Maritime Systems and Sensors. This gave the submarines the ability to carry and fire the MK 48 MOD 6AT ADCAP Torpedo. Although there are some reservations about the deal, the defense ministers and admirals of the Argentine Navy were enthusiastic about moving forward with it. The submarines were to be repaired and serviced in the Tandanor drydock facility. If the deal moves forward it would allow Argentina to restore its submarine capability which is currently defunct. As an alternative, in 2021 a Russian delegation visited the TANDANOR shipyard and other defence facilities, reportedly also making an offer to supply either the Improved Kilo-class submarine or the export variant of the Lada-class submarine to the Argentine Navy.

In July 2022, in the context of Argentina's desire to replace its submarine fleet, defence minister Jorge Taiana paid a visit to the Naval Group shipyard in Cherbourg to examine the construction process for the Scorpène-class submarine. Minister Taiana also visited Germany for a meeting with his ministerial counterpart, in order to explore the possibility of acquiring German-built submarines, either independently or in tandem with an interim acquisition of the Brazilian Navy's Tupi-class boats. However, it still remained unclear whether Argentina had either the financial resources or the political will to pursue any submarine replacement.

==== Maritime Patrol Aircraft Replacement ====
In 2019, Argentina was also pursuing the procurement of four P-3C Orion aircraft from US Navy surplus stocks since Argentina's fleet of P-3B's were no longer operational since 2019. The package deal was approved in September 2019. The US State Department has cleared the transaction of $78.03m to be carried out as part of a foreign military sale. It includes the delivery of related equipment and services. Argentina will receive four turboprop engines for the aircraft and an additional four turboprop engines. It will also receive communications and radar equipment, Infrared/Electro-optic equipment, and aviation life support systems. The US will provide spares plus repairs, aircraft depot maintenance, and logistical support. Contractors for the deal include Logistic Services International, Lockheed Martin, Rockwell Collins and Eagle Systems. These newer Orions will be up to the latest Orion standard, and provide Argentina with a much needed boost in anti-submarine and maritime surveillance missions.

However, in the aftermath of the inauguration of Alberto Fernández as president in December 2019, the deal appeared to be in limbo with the Navy now apparently considering completing the refurbishment of its older P-3B fleet pending the outcome of further discussions around the P-3C acquisition. As of early 2021, it was planned that, after upgrades, the P-3B would be returned to service starting in 2022. In December 2022, it was reported that the refurbishment of the P-3B was proceeding slower than anticipated and while a revised delivery date of the first upgraded P-3B had been projected for September 2023, that schedule might now face delays. In February 2023 it was reported that Argentina was negotiating with Norway to purchase three or four of its surplus P-3Cs. The agreement to purchase four aircraft was signed in October 2023. It had been hoped that the aircraft would be delivered in late 2023. However, by years end the aircraft had not been delivered due to an Argentine failure to make the required payment. In March 2024, it was reported that initial payments had been made. Delivery of the first aircraft took place in September 2024, with the remaining aircraft to follow in 2025. These timelines were subsequently pushed back and the third of four aircraft began refurbishment in the United States early in 2026 for handover to the Argentine Navy.

==== Future of the Fleet ====
In 2020, the Argentine national government created an interministerial committee with the objective of reassuring national oceans' sovereignty. In 2020, the Ministry of Defence informed Congress of a desire to acquire a Landing Platform Dock (LPD) as well as two naval transport vessels to increase logistical capacity, including in relation to the country's claims and presence in the Antarctic. In March 2023, an agreement was signed by Defence Minister Jorge Taiana for the Tandanor and Río Santiago shipyards to develop a multipurpose landing ship for the Argentine Navy. A polar ship and floating dock were also planned. As of early 2024, the prospective projects remained under evaluation.

Foreign overfishing is a serious concern and, in 2020, the Argentine Navy captured at least two foreign ships allegedly illegally fishing in the South Atlantic. Foreign, mostly Chinese, illegal fishing in Argentine territorial waters has been estimated to cost Argentina between US$1 billion and $2.6 billion per year. In 2016, the Argentine Coast Guard chased and sank a Chinese fishing boat that was reported to have been fishing illegally in Argentine waters. Partially to address this, a project for the re-focus of two Espora-class corvettes on patrol duties was reportedly under development. One of the corvettes subsequently selected for conversion to the offshore patrol role was ARA Parker. Subsequently in June 2024, the chief of the Argentine Navy, Admiral Carlos María Allievi, suggested that the idea of converting any additional Espora-class vessels to the offshore patrol role had been abandoned.

It remained to be determined how the several envisaged new-acquisition projects would be funded. For instance, the proposed submarine acquisition from Brazil would require extensive refurbishment of the vessels prior to being ready for renewed operational service with the Argentine Navy. As of the end of 2022, the mooted submarine deal with Brazil had not yet been finalised and the process of refurbishment not yet begun. In 2021, one analyst noted that over the past thirty years the Argentine navy has lost many core capabilities, including its aircraft carrier (along with most of its fixed-wing combat aviation), submarines and area air defence vessels. Most of these seemed unlikely to be reconstituted.

On 11 November 2026, Iran's Ministry of Foreign Affairs designated the Argentine Navy and the Argentine Air Force as "terrorist organizations". The decision was described by Tehran as a reciprocal measure following Argentina's designation of Iran's Islamic Revolutionary Guard Corps (IRGC) as a terrorist organization in April 2026. The Iranian Foreign Ministry cited its 2019 legislation on reciprocal countermeasures. Argentina's Army was not included in the designation.

== Structure ==
The Argentine navy has four main commands: High Seas Fleet, Submarine Force, Naval Aviation, and Naval Infantry (Marines). Additionally, on 1 January 2022, a Joint Maritime Command was established under the Joint Chiefs of Staff to defend Argentina's maritime sovereignty.

=== Sea Fleet ===
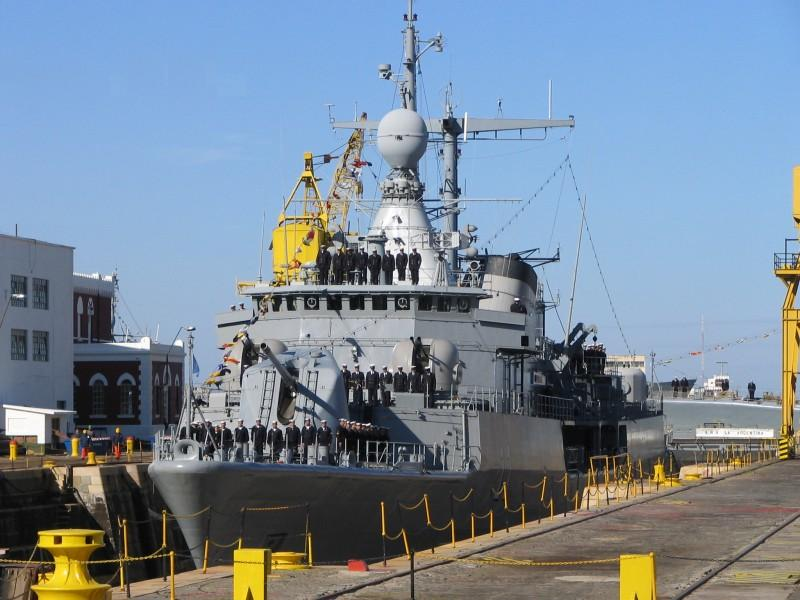
ARA La Argentina (D-11).

Puerto Belgrano Naval Base (Spanish: Base Naval Puerto Belgrano, abbreviated BNPB) is the largest naval base of the Argentine Navy, situated next to Punta Alta, near Bahía Blanca, about 700 km (435 mi) south of Buenos Aires. Most of the fleet is based there.

=== Submarine Force ===
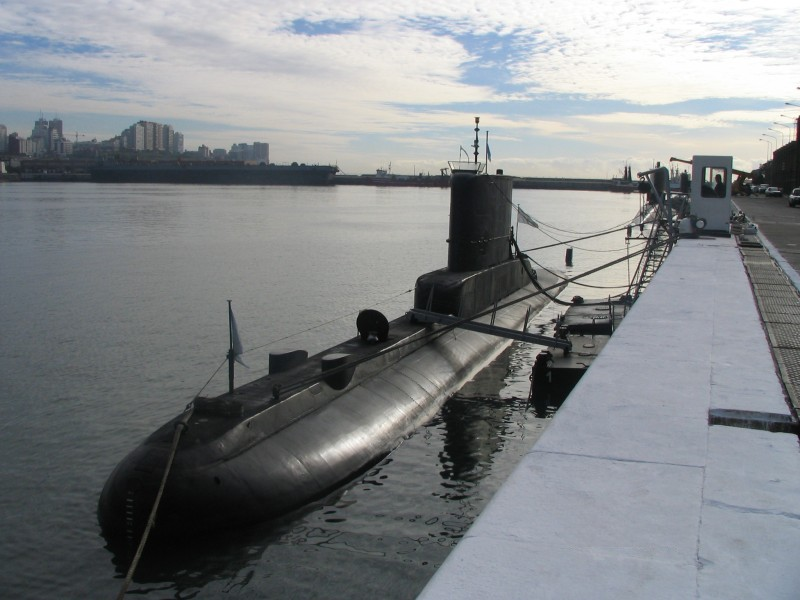
ARA Salta (S-31).

The Submarine Force Command (Spanish: Comando de la Fuerza de Submarinos, abbreviated COFS) was created when the Navy first started using submarines in 1927. The Tactical Divers Group is under the submarine force command structure. However, as of 2020 there were no operational submarines in service.

=== Naval Aviation ===
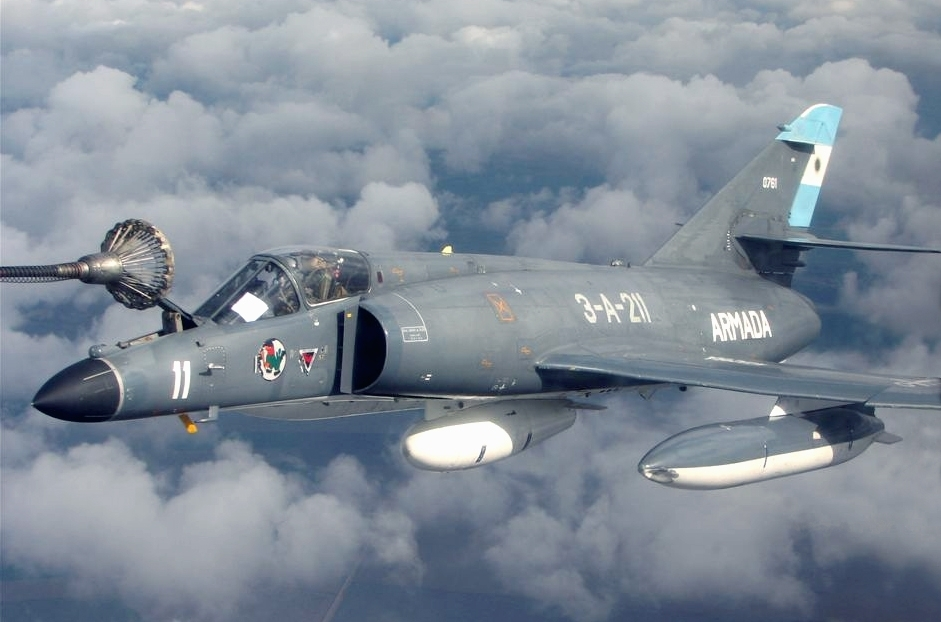
Super Étendard performing aerial refueling.

The Naval Aviation Command (Spanish: Comando de Aviación Naval, abbreviated COAN) is the naval aviation branch. Argentina is one of two South American countries to have operated two aircraft carriers. However, neither remain in service. During the Falkland's War, Argentine naval aviation employed the Dassault-Breguet Super Étendard fighter and its Exocet air-to-surface missiles being responsible for the destruction of both HMS Sheffield as well as the merchant vessel Atlantic Conveyor.

Efforts to upgrade and retain the Super Etendard in service were initially reported to have been abandoned in 2023 due to a combination of U.K. sanctions impacting the ability to obtain spare parts for the Martin Baker Mk. 6 ejection seats and due France's inability to provide other spare parts for the aging aircraft. Five refurbished aircraft had been delivered from France in 2019. However, these aircraft have not been brought into service due to the spare parts problem. Subsequent to the report that that aircraft would not be brought into service, the Argentine Navy issued a statement that the process had not in fact been abandoned. In early 2024, it was reported that the Navy was still working to restore at least two of the aircraft to flying condition. However, as of mid-2025 an inability to obtain spare parts meant that the project to restore the aircraft to flying condition reportedly had been abandoned.

After more than 60 years of service, the S-2T Turbo Tracker was formally retired on 1 December 2025.

=== Naval Infantry ===
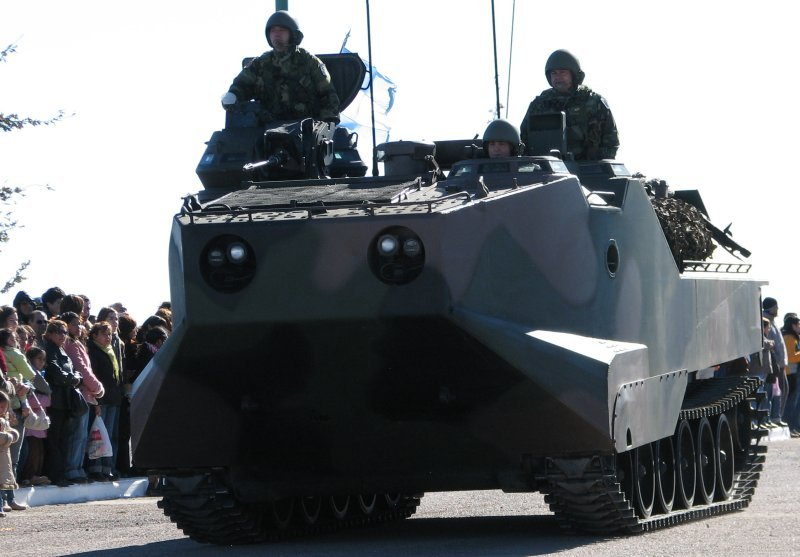
Argentine LVTP-7

The Naval Infantry Command (Comando de Infantería de Marina) is the Argentine Navy's marine branch. Naval infantry have the same rank, insignia, and titles as the rest of the Navy, and are deployed abroad on UN peacekeeping missions.

=== Hydrographic Service ===
The Argentine Naval Hydrographic Service (Spanish: Servicio de Hidrografía Naval, abbreviated SHN) provides national hydrographics services.

=== Joint Maritime Command ===
The Joint Maritime Command (CCM, in Spanish) was established on 1 January 2022 and brings together Argentine Army, Navy and Air Force assets to combat maritime crime and to control ocean and river areas under its jurisdiction. Its principal maritime assets are the navy's patrol vessels, including its Gowind-class offshore patrol vessels.

== Ranks ==
=== Officers ===
Rank insignia consists of a variable number of gold-braid stripes worn on the sleeve cuffs or on shoulder-boards. Officers may be distinguished by the characteristic loop of the top stripe (in the manner of British Royal Navy officers). Combat uniforms may include metal pin-on or embroidered collar rank insignia. Rank insignia is worn on the chest when in shipboard or flying coveralls.

Officers are commissioned in either the Command (line) Corps (those who attend the Escuela Naval Militar- Military Naval College) or the Staff Corps (Professional Officers who only attend a short course in the Naval Academy after getting a civilian degree, except for the Paymasters who instead attend the Naval College).

The Line Corps is divided into three branches: the Naval branch (including Surface Warfare, Submarine Warfare and Naval Aviation sub-branches), the Marine Corps branch, and Executive -Engineering- branch. Line Corps' reserve officers are considered Restricted Line (Escalafon Complementario) officers in any of the Warfare Communities (Surface, Submarine, Marines, Aviation and Propulsion), and can only raise to OF-4 rank (Capitan de Fragata).

All Line Corps officers wear distinctive branch/sub-branch insignia on the right breast. Some Staff Corps officers also wear specialisation badges (Aviation, Surface, Submarine and Marines). Other common insignia is the Naval War College insignia, parachute wings, etc., also worn on the right breast. Medals and Ribbons, if awarded, are worn on the left breast, just above the chest pocket. The rank insignia of Staff Corps' officers is placed over a background colour denoting the wearer's field, such as purple (Chaplains), blue (Engineers), red (Health Corps), white (Paymasters), green (Judge Advocate Officers), brown (Technical Officers, promoted from the ranks) and grey (special branch). The background colour for Command Corps officers is navy blue/black.

Rank group	General / flag officers				Senior officers			Junior officers
Argentine Navy
Argentine Navy	Almirante	Vicealmirante	Contralmirante	Comodoro de marina	Capitán de navío	Capitán de fragata	Capitán de corbeta	Teniente de navío	Teniente de fragata	Teniente de corbeta	Guardiamarina

=== Enlisted ratings and Non-Commissioned Officers ===
Other ranks' insignia (not including Seamen) is worn on either shoulderboards or breast or sleeve patches. Seamen and Seamen Recruits wear their insignia on their sleeves. The shoulderboards denote the wearer's specialty.

Rank group	Senior NCOs					Junior NCOs		Enlisted
Argentine Navy
Argentine Navy	Suboficial mayor	Suboficial principal	Suboficial primero	Suboficial segundo	Cabo principal	Cabo primero	Cabo segundo	Marinero primero	Marinero segundo

== Uniform ==
=== Beards ===
Following a global trend, Argentine armed forces have prohibited beards since the 1920s. This was reinforced in the Cold War era when they were deemed synonymous with leftist leanings. The only exception were Antarctic service within the three armed forces as a protection from cold weather, and submarine service within the Navy as a way of saving water. However, shaving was mandatory upon return to headquarters.

In 2000 the Navy broke with this tradition within the Argentine armed forces as Adm. Joaquín Stella, then Navy Chief of Staff allowed beards for officers with ranks above Teniente de Corbeta (Second Lieutenant), according to Section 1.10.1.1 of the Navy Uniform regulations (R.A-1-001). Adm. Stella gave the example himself by becoming the first bearded Argentine admiral since Adm. Sáenz Valiente in the 1920s. Non commissioned officers can wear beards from Suboficial Segundo rank, and upwards. However, beards were prohibited again in 2016, except for some specific office positions.
