= ARA Santísima Trinidad =

At least three ships of the Argentine Navy have been named Santísima Trinidad, with or without the prefix ARA ((in Spanish) Armada República Argentina):

- Santísima Trinidad (1814), a brigantine that participated in the Argentine War of Independence in 1814–16. She was commanded by Miguel Brown, and then by his brother Admiral William Brown.
- ARA Santísima Trinidad (P-34), ex-HMS Caicos, a patrol frigate of the U.S. Tacoma class which served in the Argentine Navy from 1948 to 1969. She was renamed Comodoro Augusto Lasserre (Q-9), when she became a survey ship in 1963.
- ARA Santísima Trinidad (D-2), a Type 42 destroyer in service 1981 to 1989, which participated in the Falklands War in 1982.

== See also ==
- Santísima Trinidad (disambiguation)
