= Santísima Trinidad =

Santisima Trinidad (meaning Most Holy Trinity in Spanish) may refer to:

== Places ==
- Santísima Trinidad (fort), a fortress that once existed on the Bio Bio River in Bio Bío province, Chile
- Santísima Trinidad (Asunción), a barrio (district) in Asunción, Paraguay and home of the football club Sportivo Trinidense
- La Santísima Trinidad de Paraná, a former Jesuit mission in Paraguay
- Santisima Trinidad (Taiwan), a Spanish settlement from 1626 to 1642 on the island of Formosa

== Ships ==
- One of several Spanish ships including:
  - Santísima Trinidad (1600s), a 400-ton galleon, which escaped when Panama City was attacked in 1671 and was later captured by English buccaneers
  - Spanish ship Santísima Trinidad (1751) – largest of the Manila galleons; officially named Santísima Trinidad y Nuestra Señora del Buen Fin, captured by the British in 1762
  - Spanish ship Nuestra Señora de la Santísima Trinidad (1769), world's largest warship in its time, until it sank after the Battle of Trafalgar (1805)
- One of several Argentine warships including:
  - Santísima Trinidad (1814), a brigantine of the Independence Wars era
  - ARA Santísima Trinidad (D-2), a Type 42 destroyer in service with the Argentine Navy 1981–1989.

== See also ==
- Buenos Aires, Argentina - its original name in 1560 was Ciudad de la Santísima Trinidad, Puerto de Buenos Aires
- Roman Catholic Archdiocese of Buenos Aires - Santísima Trinidad was an alternative title in the early 20th century
- ARA Santísima Trinidad - page listing all Argentine Navy ships with this name
