= Juan Manuel Cafferata =

Argentine politician

25 Governor of Santa Fe
- In office April 7, 1890 – August 1893
- Preceded by: José Gálvez
- Succeeded by: Luciano Leiva

Personal details
- Born: April 1, 1852 Buenos Aires, Argentina
- Died: 23 September 1920 (aged 68) Córdoba, Argentina
- Party: National Autonomist Party
- Occupation: Lawyer

Juan Manuel Cafferata (1 January 1852 – 23 September 1920) was an Argentine politician of the National Autonomist Party. He was the governor of province of Santa Fe between 1890 and 1893.

Cafferata was born in Buenos Aires, the son of an immigrant businessman from Genoa, Italy, who had settled in Rosario (southern Santa Fe). He studied law at the Jesuit's College of the Immaculate Conception in the city of Santa Fe. He then moved to Córdoba and became Doctor in Jurisprudence at the University of San Carlos (later National University of Córdoba). At this time he was also a member of the provincial Chamber of Deputies (the lower house of the legislature) and of the Municipal Council of Córdoba.

He returned to Rosario after his graduation in 1881 to become the Political Chief of the city (at the time the local municipal authorities were appointed by the provincial government, not elected by the citizens).

Cafferata was Minister of Government to governors Manuel María Zavalla, José Gálvez and his own successor Luciano Leiva. After Gálvez's rule he was elected to replace him. He was the governor of Santa Fe from 7 April 1890 until his resignation in August 1893.

During Cafferata's term, 17 colonies were founded in the province and many elementary schools were opened. He also saw the opening of the Salesian College of Arts and Crafts, now San José College, in Rosario, and the official inauguration of the Provincial University of Santa Fe, projected during his predecessor's rule. Facing a difficult economic situation, his government issued bonds without authorization of the Legislature to pay public employees' salaries.

A few days after the beginning of the uprising known as the Revolution of 1893, which questioned the legitimacy of the elections that had taken him to power, Cafferata resigned and moved with his family to Buenos Aires. The revolution, led by the newly formed Radical Civic Union against the rule of the National Autonomist Party, brought the Radical governor Mariano Candioti to power, though only for less than two months, until the defeat of the Radicals, first on the national level, and then in Santa Fe.

Cafferata died in Córdoba, in 1920, of tuberculosis. His remains were brought to Rosario and buried in the Saviour's Cemetery.

Preceded by José Gálvez	Governor of Santa Fe; 1890–1893	Succeeded by Luciano Leiva
