= Thomas Cochrane campaign =

- Part of Peruvian War of Independence and Chilean War of Independence in the Spanish American wars of independence
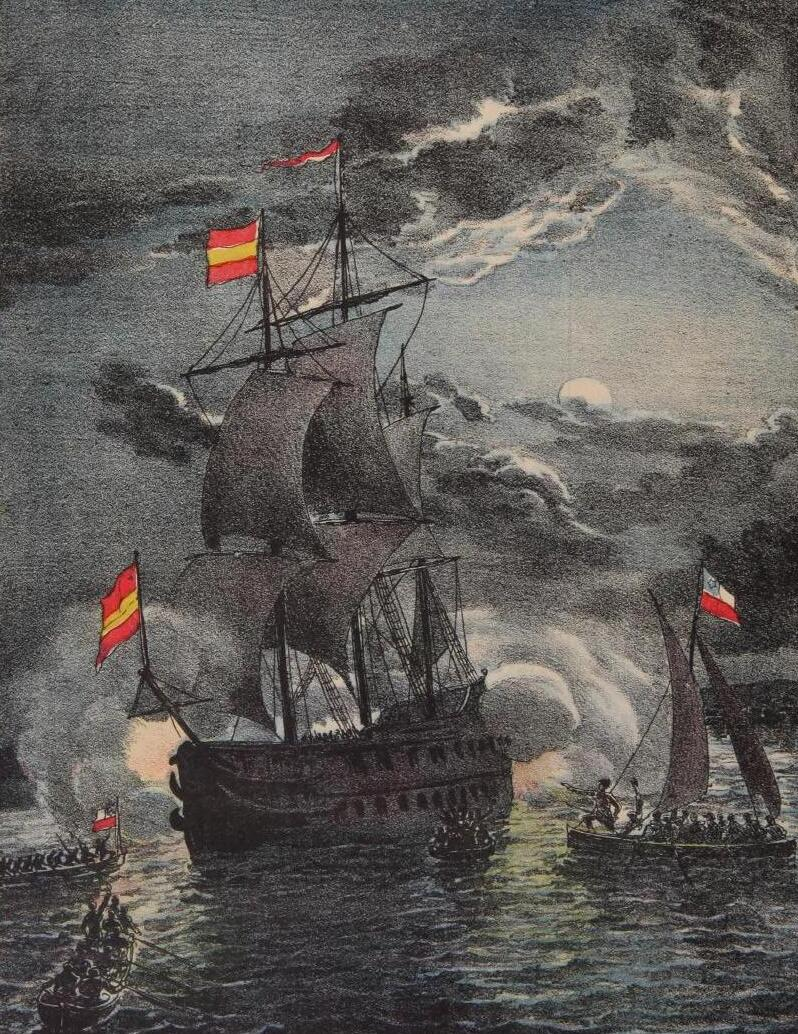
- Capture of La Esmeralda in Callao by Lord Thomas Cochrane in 1820.
Date	1819-1822
Location	Coastline of the entire Pacific coast from Chile to California
Result	Patriot Navy victory; Expeditious control of the sea by the patriots.; Capture of the Spanish frigate Esmeralda in Callao.; Capture of the square of Valdivia and blockade of Callao.; Pursuit of the frigates of the Royal Navy that surrender to the Government of Guayaquil.

Belligerents
Chile; Protectorate of Peru; United Provinces of the Río de la Plata	Spain

Commanders and leaders
Thomas Cochrane; Manuel Blanco Encalada; Hipolito Bouchard	Antonio Vacaro; Manuel Montoya; Antonio de Quintanilla

Units involved
Chilean Navy; Peruvian Navy (since 1821); Army of the Andes	Spanish Royal Navy

The Thomas Cochrane campaign was a series of mainly naval war actions carried out by the admiral hired by the Chilean government, Thomas Cochrane, a British naval officer who was given Chilean nationality. Cochrane had been assigned the objective of the Chilean government to end Spanish naval power in the Pacific, mainly the port of Callao and achieve control of the Pacific Ocean. He carried out several actions to achieve his goal, in addition to participating in the attack of objectives on land such as the capture of Valdivia or Pisco.

The campaign was developed from September 12, 1819 with the departure of the Chilean squadron from Valparaíso to Callao to begin the so-called first blockade of Callao and ended in 1822, coinciding with the surrender of the Spanish frigates "Prueba" and "Venganza", and the corvette "Emperador Alejandro" to the government of the Free Province of Guayaquil, in February 1822, due to the absence of ports and supplies, a product of the territorial conquests of the independent states.

The campaign had the added difficulty that the Spanish squadron could take refuge in Callao, which had around 350 siege cannons and a real floating trench, the product of the ingenuity of Brigadier Antonio Vacaro, made up of logs joined by chains that barely left a narrow entrance and prevented an effective attack to finish off the Spanish. Cochrane had used various methods to capture or destroy the Spanish squadron stationed in the port, of which we can highlight the use of Congreve rockets, which had a disappointing result.

After two expeditions to Peru, where Cochrane had twice blockaded the port of Callao and attacked its surroundings, he headed towards the southern coast of Chile with the aim of capturing the second most important royalist enclave, which was in Valdivia. After convincing himself that the San Telmo ship , the flagship of the South Sea Division, with 74 cannons and 650 crew members, was not waiting for him, he ordered an invasion, managing to capture the town of Valdivia after a daring attack on 3 and 4 February 1820. Encouraged by this success, he wanted to imitate the same attack on the island of Chiloé, which remained loyal to the Spanish monarchy until 1826, attacking on 18 February 1820 the Agüi Fort, which was the strongest point on the island. When the attack failed, Cochrane ordered the attempt to be abandoned.

== Spanish ships captured, surrendered or destroyed during the Cochrane operations ==
- 44-gun Esmeralda frigate
- Merchant frigate armed with Resolution of 34 to 36 cannons
- Sebastiana corvette of 28 to 34 cannons
- Pezuela brig with 18 to 22 cannons
- Brigantine Potrillo of 16 to 18 cannons
- Brigantine San Francisco Javier of 16 guns
- Proserpina schooner of 14 cannons
- Begoña armed merchant frigate with 18 to 20 cannons
- Armed merchant frigate Águila with 20 cannons
- Merchant corvette armed with 36 guns Emperador Alejandro
- Veloz Corvette or Brig of 30 cannons
- Aranzazù armed brig or pailebot with 12 cannons
- Brigantine Lucero
- Brigantine San Agustin
- Brigantine Congress
- Brigantine Monarch
- Brigantine Clear
- Justiniana brig of 8 guns
- San Fernando armed frigate with 26 cannons
- Milagro armed frigate with 14 cannons
- Armed frigate Carmen
- Trujillana armed frigate (formerly Palafox) with 18 to 22 cannons
- Schooner Moctezuma (belonging to independent Peru)
- Schooner Jesús María
- Ave María Schooner
- Schooner Mercedes
- Schooner Teresana
- 16 gunboats and various transports.

The rest of the ships that were not captured or destroyed and therefore not mentioned in the list are due to the fact that during the campaign some Spanish ships retreated to the Peninsula or the Philippines.

The list does not include all the ships that were captured or destroyed by the Chilean squadron under the command of Admiral Thomas Cochrane because there is no exact list of all the prizes from this campaign.
