= ARA Almirante Brown (1880) =

1880 ironclad

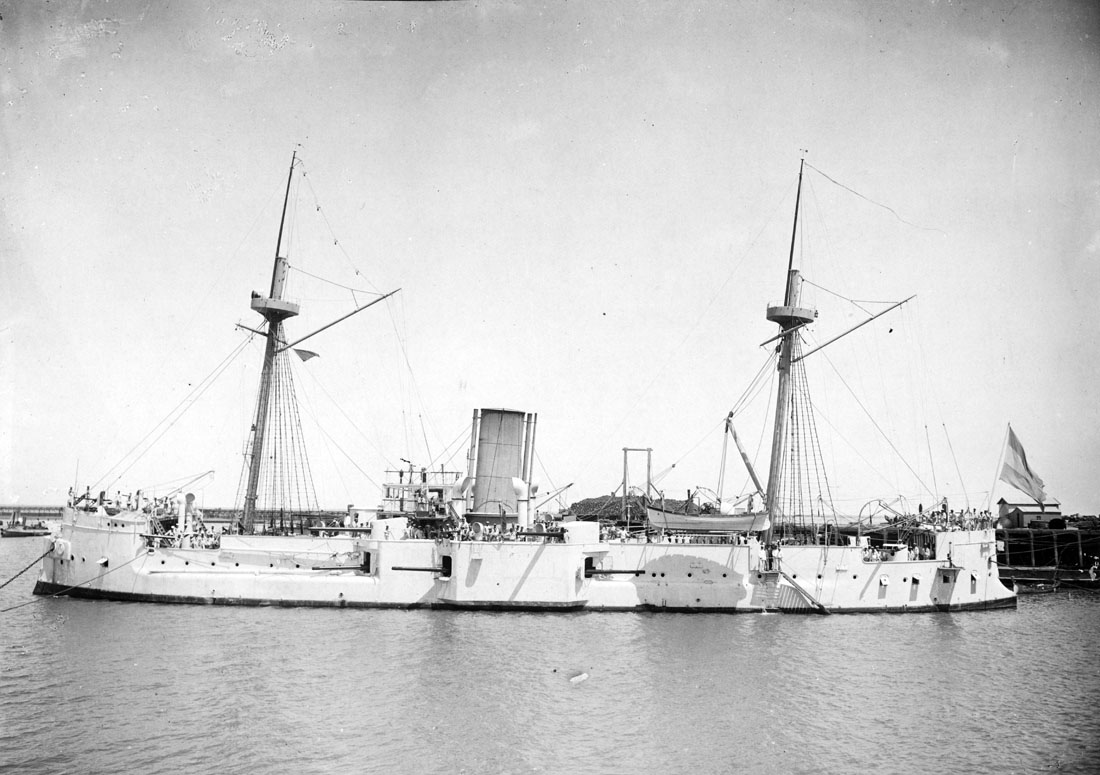

History

Argentina
- Name: Almirante Brown
- Namesake: William Brown
- Builder: Samuda Brothers, London
- Launched: 6 October 1880
- Refit: 1897–98
- Stricken: 17 November 1932
- Fate: Scrapped, 1932

General characteristics
- Type: Central-battery ironclad
- Displacement: 4,200 long tons (4,300 t)
- Length: 240 ft (73.2 m) (p/p)
- Beam: 50 ft (15.2 m)
- Draft: 20 ft 6 in (6.2 m) (deep load)
- Installed power: 8 cylindrical boilers; 5,400 ihp (4,000 kW)
- Propulsion: 2 × Compound steam engines; 2 × screw propellers
- Speed: 14 knots (26 km/h; 16 mph)
- Complement: 520
- Armament: 8 × 1 – Armstrong 8-inch (203 mm) Rifled breech loaders; 6 × 1 – 4.7-inch (120 mm) guns; 2 × 1 – 9-pounder guns; 2 × 1 – 7-pounder guns
- Armor: Belt: 6–9 in (152–229 mm); Deck: .625–1.5 in (16–38 mm); Battery: 6–8 in (152–203 mm); Conning tower: 8 in (203 mm); Bulkheads: 5.5–7.5 in (140–191 mm)

ARA Almirante Brown was a central battery ironclad of the Argentine Navy built in the 1880s by Samuda Brothers in London. Almirante Brown displaced 4,200 long tons (4,300 t) and had a top speed of 14 knots (26 km/h; 16 mph). The ship was protected by a belt of nine-inch (230 mm) steel-faced armor and she carried a main battery of eight breech-loading guns. She was among the first major warships in the world to use steel armor, and remained the largest vessel in the Argentine fleet for over 15 years. Almirante Brown had a peaceful career in the fleet during the 1880s and 1890s. By the 1920s, she was reduced to a coastal defense ship, and remained in service until the early 1930s. She was stricken from the naval register in November 1932 and sold for scrapping.

== Design ==
In the 1860s, the Argentine Navy had few warships, but the government of President Domingo Faustino Sarmiento embarked on a modest program to strengthen the fleet. In the early 1870s, the fleet acquired a pair of small, coastal monitors of the El Plata class, built in Britain. These ships were suitable only for coastal defense operations. By the end of the decade, the naval ascendancy of their rival in Chile (in part due to their successes in the War of the Pacific against Peru and Bolivia that would begin in 1879), prompted the Argentine government to purchase another, larger and more powerful vessel that would be able to overpower any Chilean counterpart. In 1878, they requested a design from William Henry White, a noted warship designer who was then the British Assistant Chief Constructor of the Navy.

The acquisition of Almirante Brown led to a minor arms race; she prompted the Brazilian Navy to purchase a pair of larger ironclads, Riachuelo and Aquidabã. These, in turn, led the United States Navy to order its first modern, steel-hulled ships: the protected cruisers Atlanta, Boston, and Chicago and the dispatch boat Dolphin, followed soon thereafter by the ironclad battleship Texas and armored cruiser Maine, the latter very similar to Riachuelo.

=== General characteristics and machinery ===
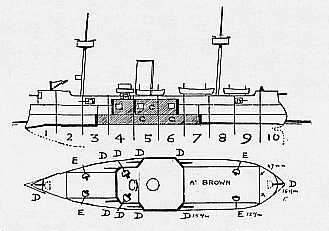
Line-drawing of Almirante Brown

Almirante Brown was 240 feet (73 m) long between perpendiculars, and had a beam of 50 ft (15 m) and a draft of 20 ft 6 in (6.25 m). She displaced up to 4,200 long tons (4,300 t) at full load. Her hull was steel-built, with a 3 in (76 mm) thick layer of teak, covered with zinc sheathing to protect it from biofouling during lengthy periods between dry-docking for cleaning; accumulations of marine growth would reduce the ship's speed. The use of steel instead of iron saved considerable weight that was used to increase armor protection and the size of her guns, allowing much stronger offensive and defensive characteristics that compared favorably to larger ironclads that had been built using iron. The vessel would have had to have been about 1,000 tons heavier if iron had been used, which in turn would have required more powerful engines to maintain the ship's speed.

The hull was divided into multiple watertight compartments and included a double bottom and a ram bow. She was largely flush-decked, with a short, raised forecastle and sterncastle at either end of the ship. Her superstructure was fairly minimal, consisting primarily of a small conning tower. She was fitted with two pole masts that had fighting tops. The ship had a crew of 520 officers and men.

Her propulsion system consisted of two inverted compound steam engines that drove a pair of screw propellers. The engines were manufactured by the firm Maudslay, Sons and Field. Steam for the engines was provided by eight coal-fired, cylindrical water-tube boilers. The boilers were split into four separate, watertight boiler rooms, and both of the steam engines were in individual engine rooms. The boilers were vented through a single funnel placed amidships.

The engines were rated at 5,400 indicated horsepower (4,000 kW) and produced a top speed of 14 knots (26 km/h; 16 mph). Almirante Brown had the capacity to store up to 650 metric tons (640 long tons; 720 short tons) of coal for the boilers. At a more economical pace of 10 knots (19 km/h; 12 mph), the ship could steam for a total of about 4,300 nautical miles (8,000 km; 4,900 mi). To supplement her steam engines on longer voyages, Almirante Brown was fitted with a sailing rig for auxiliary cruising. The sail plan had an area of 10,000 square feet (930 m^{2}).

=== Armament and armor ===
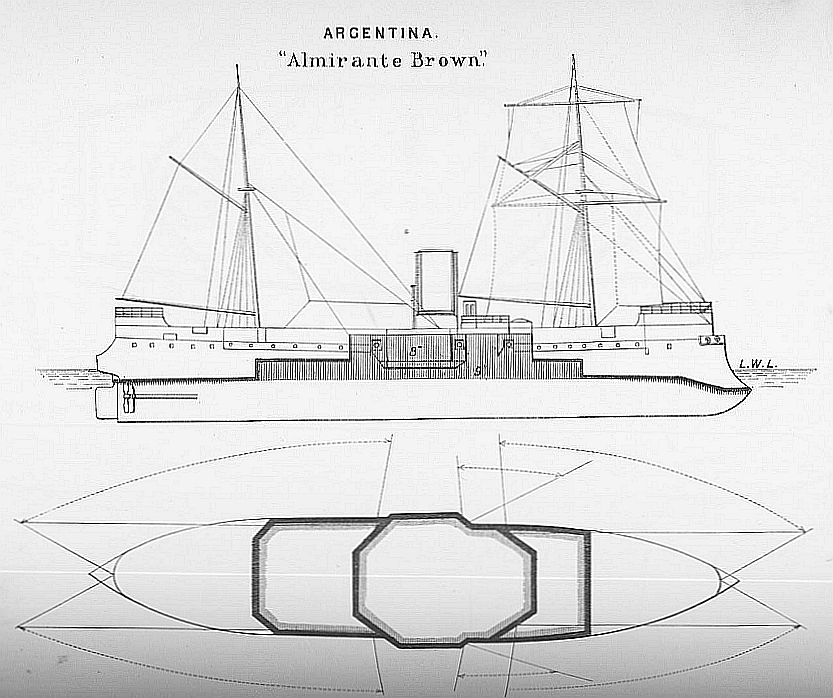
Line-drawing showing the sail plan and the firing arcs of the main battery guns

Almirante Brown was equipped with a main battery of eight 8-inch (203 mm) BLR Armstrong guns, all mounted individually in casemates. Six were in a central battery, and the other two were in the bow and stern as chase guns. The central battery was sponsoned out over the hull to position the guns such that four could fire directly ahead and two could fire astern. These breech-loading guns were a new development, which rendered Almirante Brown a significantly more powerful vessel than even those that had been completed a few years earlier. The central battery was protected by heavy armor plate, but the chase guns were entirely unprotected, beyond the thin hull plating that enclosed their positions. The guns fired a 180-pound (82 kg) shell, using a 90 lb (41 kg) propellant charge. These shells were capable of penetrating 16 in (410 mm) of wrought iron armor, which was the type of armor that protected most ironclads in service in foreign navies.

She also carried a secondary battery of six 4.7 in (120 mm) guns, also in single pivot mounts, all on the upper deck. Four were mounted forward, and two were located aft, on either side of the 8-inch stern-chaser. Close-range defense against small craft was provided by a pair of 9-pounder guns and a pair of 7-pounder guns.

The ship was protected with compound armor with a steel face manufactured by the German firm Siemens; the use of steel armor was a new development in naval technology, and permitted significant weight savings. The ship's armor was backed with teak planking, and attached with screws internally, so as to preserve the uniform outer face of the armor. The average thickness of the teak planking was 10 in (254 mm).

The main armored belt extended from 3 ft (0.91 m) above the waterline to 4 ft (1.2 m) below, and it ran for a length of 120 ft (37 m). Above the waterline, the belt was 9 in (229 mm) thick amidships in the central citadel, where it protected the propulsion machinery spaces and ammunition magazines. It was reduced to 7.5 in (191 mm) at either end. Below the waterline, the main belt was reduced in thickness to 6 in (152 mm) thick amidships and 1.5 in (38 mm) on either end of the ship. The central citadel was capped at either end by transverse bulkheads that were 5.5 to 7.5 in (140 to 190 mm) thick.

Above the main belt, two strakes of armor plate protected the central battery. The lower strake was 8 in of steel armor, while the upper strake was reduced slightly to 6 in of armor. Atop the central battery, the armored deck was 0.625 in (15.9 mm) thick. On either ends of the citadel, a curved armor deck that ranged in thickness from 1.25 to 1.5 in (32 to 38 mm) provided a degree of protection against enemy fire. Along the length of the ship, the armor protection was reinforced by coal storage bunkers that further reduced the ability of hostile shells from penetrating into the ship's vital areas. The conning tower also had 8 in thick sides.

== Service history ==
Almirante Brown in harbor

In 1878, Argentina made inquiries in Britain to buy a new, ocean-going capital ship for its navy, which to that point, had consisted of only coastal and riverine forces, centered on the two small El Plata-class monitors. Almirante Brown, the first large ironclad of the Argentine Navy, was ordered from the Samuda Brothers shipyard of London. She was launched on 6 October 1880, was named for Admiral William Brown, an Irishman who had served in the Argentine Navy from 1814 to 1845. The ship cost the Argentine government £270,000. On 14 June 1881, she conducted speed trials on the Maplin Mile, and achieved her designed speed of 14 knots at full power. In mid-August, while still in Britain, the ship carried out test firings of her guns to determine that the new powder charges were safe to use. These were completed without issues. Upon her delivery to Argentina, she was the largest vessel in the Argentine fleet, and remained so until the four Garibaldi-class armored cruisers were acquired in the late 1890s.

Almirante Brown was present during the ceremonies for the opening of the south basin in the harbor of Buenos Aires on 28 January 1889. On 13 July 1892, the ship was thought to be lost in a storm that claimed the torpedo boat Rosales. The protected cruiser Veinticinco de Mayo was also believed to have sunk in the storm, though both survived. In the following year, Almirante Brown, along with most of the heavy units in the Argentine Navy, took part in putting down the naval defections in the revolution of 1893, where the ironclad shelled and disabled the rebel torpedo boat Murature off Martin García island.

In 1897, Almirante Brown went into dry dock at the La Seyne shipyard in Toulon for modernization. Her main battery guns were replaced with ten 5.9 in (150 mm) 50-caliber quick-firing Canet guns; six replaced the guns in the central battery, and the other four were mounted in pairs in place of the bow and stern guns. In addition, the old 4.7-inch guns were replaced with new quick-firing models. Her crew was reduced to 380 officers and men. By 1901, the ship had been laid up in reserve at Río Santiago, but she was reactivated that year for a training cruise to Bahía Blanca. On 15 October 1904, Almirante Brown hosted the Argentine naval minister, Juan A. Martín, and a delegation of foreign naval officers, including Rear Admiral French Ensor Chadwick of the US Navy; Martin welcomed them on behalf of the new government under President Manuel Quintana, who had recently taken office.

By the 1920s, Almirante Brown had been reduced to a coastal defense and training ship, having long since been rendered obsolete by the dreadnought battleships Moreno and Rivadavia. On 17 December 1921, crewmen from Almirante Brown rowed ashore to defeat a group of about 250 brigands based in Mata Tapera. The ship remained in service until the early 1930s. On 17 November 1932, Almirante Brown was stricken from the naval register and subsequently discarded.

== See also ==
- List of ships of the Argentine Navy
