= Manuel Quintana =

10th President of Argentina

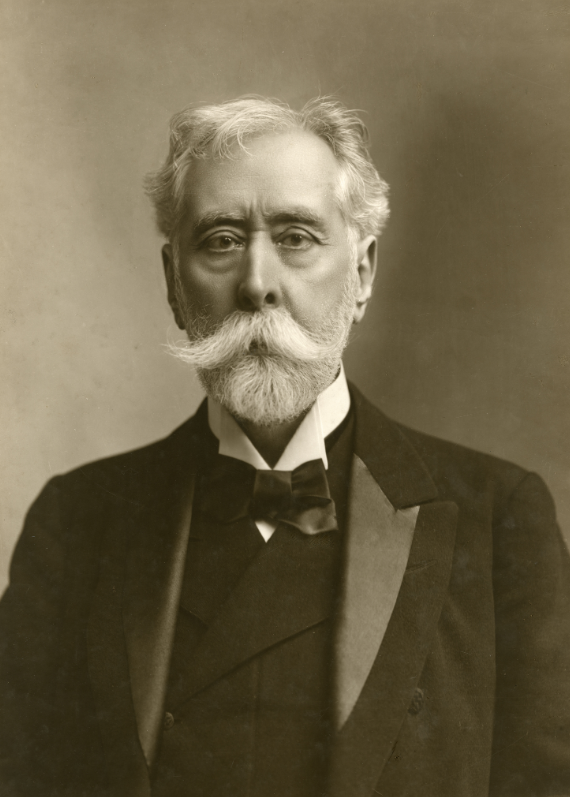

15th President of Argentina
- In office October 12, 1904 – March 12, 1906
- Vice President: José Figueroa Alcorta
- Preceded by: Julio A. Roca
- Succeeded by: José Figueroa Alcorta

Minister of the Interior
- In office October 12, 1892 – December 13, 1892
- President: Luis Sáenz Peña
- Preceded by: José Vicente Zapata
- Succeeded by: Tomás S. de Anchorena
- In office August 12, 1893 – December 7, 1894
- President: Luis Sáenz Peña
- Preceded by: Lucio Vicente López
- Succeeded by: Eduardo Costa

Personal details
- Born: Manuel Pedro Quintana Sáenz; October 19, 1835 Buenos Aires, Argentina
- Died: March 12, 1906 (aged 70) Buenos Aires, Argentina
- Resting place: La Recoleta Cemetery; Buenos Aires, Argentina
- Party: National Autonomist Party
- Spouse: Susana Rodríguez Viana
- Education: University of Buenos Aires
- Profession: Lawyer

Manuel Pedro Quintana Sáenz (October 19, 1835 – March 12, 1906) was the President of Argentina from 1904 until his death in 1906.

== Biography ==
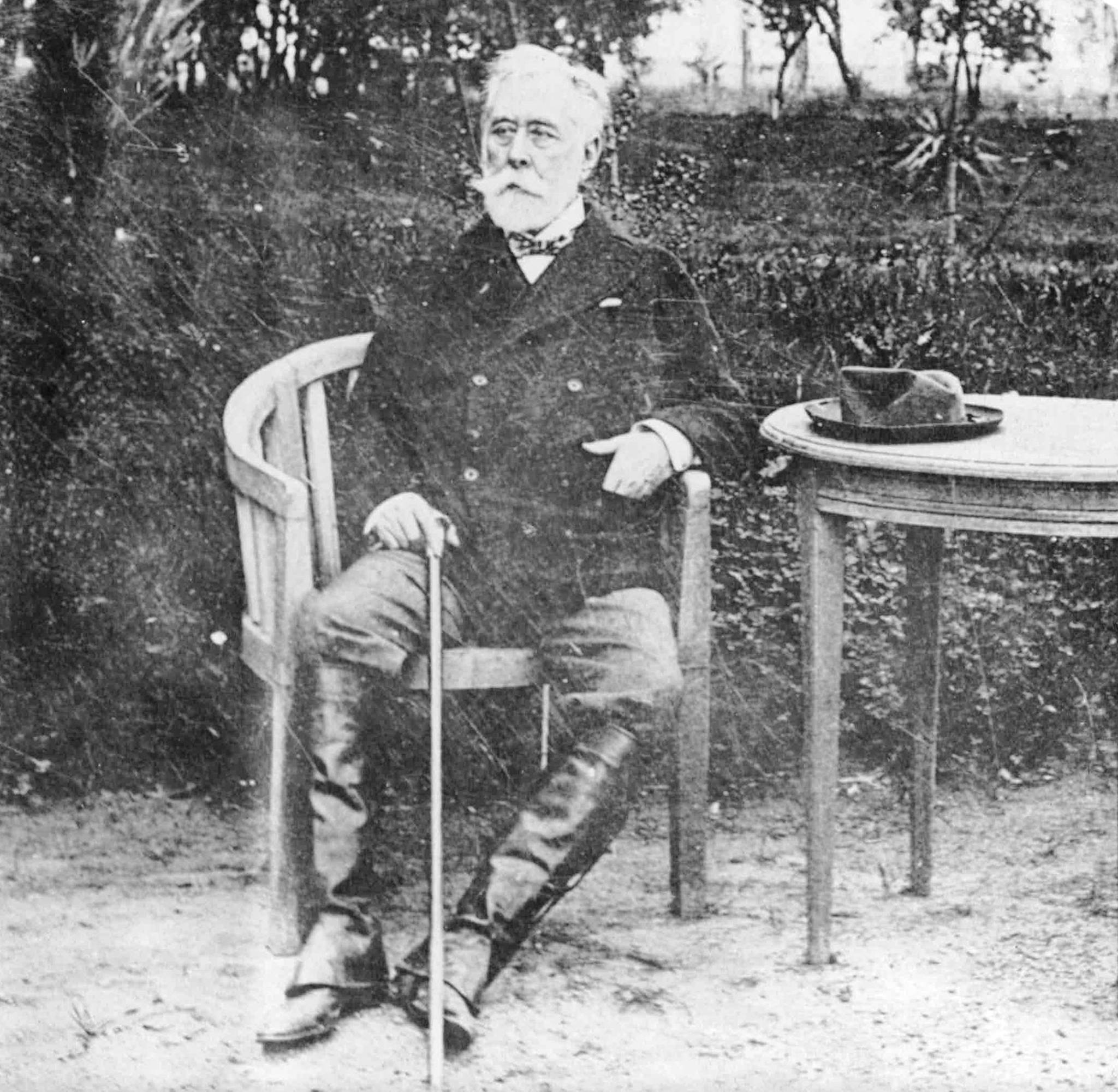
Manuel Quintana in the field

Manuel Quintana was born on October 19, 1835, son of Eladio de la Quintana y Uzín, and María Manuela Bernardina Sáenz de Gaona y Álzaga.

He received a law degree from the University of Buenos Aires in 1855 at the age of twenty and two years later he directed the chair of civil law at the same university.

On December 14, 1861, he married María del Carmen Susana Rodríguez Viana in the Church of San Nicolás de Bari, in Buenos Aires, and they had ten children.

=== Political career ===
He participated in politics since his youth and in 1860 he was elected deputy of the legislature of the Province of Buenos Aires, by the party of Bartolomé Mitre. Subsequently, he went to the Autonomist Party of Adolfo Alsina to oppose Miter's project to name the City of Buenos Aires Capital of the Republic.

In 1864, he was elected member of the Argentine Chamber of Deputies for the province of Buenos Aires and presented a bill to name the City of Rosario as the nation's capital, which would be approved but vetoed by the executive power.

In 1870 he was elected National Senator and in 1871 President Sarmiento sent him to Asunción to negotiate the peace treaty that ended the War of the Triple Alliance against Paraguay.

In 1873 he became a Freemason. Also in that year he presented himself as a candidate in the presidential elections to succeed Sarmiento from 1874, but he lost to Nicolás Avellaneda.

In 1877 he held the title of rector of the University of Buenos Aires until 1881 when his term ended.

=== Quintana proposes to England to bomb Rosario ===
In 1876 there was an incident between the government of Santa Fe, at that time in charge of Servando Bayo, and the branch of the Bank of London in Rosario, for not having followed the law that ordered the conversion to gold of all emissions of paper money made by the government of the province.

As a result of this situation, the arrest of the branch manager and the intervention of the branch were ordered. Quintana was a National Senator and the bank's legal advisor at the time of the crisis, and he did not hesitate to resign from his bank for "health reasons." However, Quintana traveled to London, where he proposed to the government of Great Britain the bombing of the city of Rosario if the government of Santa Fe did not cancel the intervention of the bank.

=== Presidential election ===
At the end of the second presidency of Julio A. Roca, the National Autonomist Party was divided into two factions: the one led by Roca and the one led by former president Carlos Pellegrini; For this reason, Roca sought an alliance with Bartolomé Mitre's party, proposing an alliance formula that would lead a Mitrist, Manuel Quintana, as a candidate for president, accompanied by the roquista José Figueroa Alcorta. In the presidential elections of April 10, 1904, this formula was triumphant, and they were proclaimed President and Vice President of the Nation on June 12 of the same year by the electoral college. Quintana was 68 years old at the time.

== Presidency ==
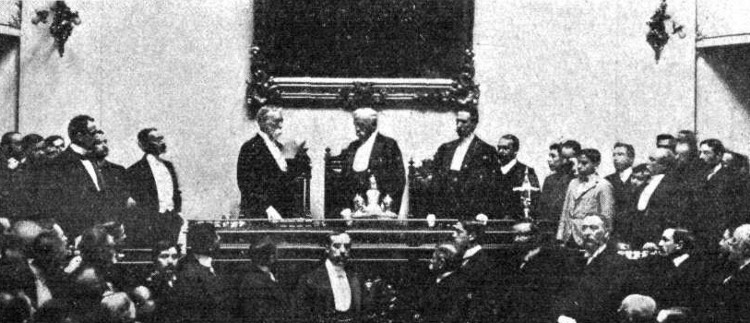
Assumption of Manuel Quintana as president

His presidency took place within the scope of the period called the "Liberal Republic" or "Conservative Republic", marked by the elitist government of the National Autonomist Party and electoral fraud.

The Quintana government was a mere continuation of the previous ones: its foreign and economic policies followed the guidelines of Roca's; the economy continued to improve, driven by increased trade and the rail network continued to expand.

=== Government works ===
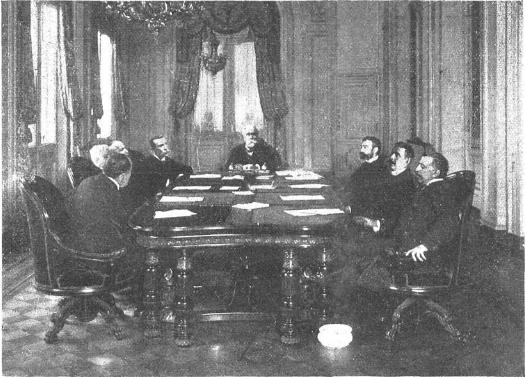
Quintana and his cabinet

Among his government efforts, it is worth highlighting the sanction of the Sunday rest law, the nationalization of the University of La Plata, the regulation of the exercise of the liberal professions, proposed by the socialist deputy Alfredo Palacios, and the "Lainez Law" for the creation of elementary schools in the provinces. A law aimed at providing funding for public housing was also passed.

Quintana did not agree with the uninominal system, established by the electoral law of 1901, since the system of patronage and the pressure on voters had not been modified. So he sent a bill to Congress, proposing a single and universal registry –based on military service records– and the mandatory nature of voting. The original project was so modified that the only thing it had in common with the one presented by the president was the elimination of the single-member system; it was a complete return to the previous system, with all its flaws.

=== Radical revolution of 1905 ===
Since the defeat of 1893, and even more since the division between "bernardistas" and followers of Hipólito Yrigoyen, no one seriously considered the Unión Cívica Radical as a party with the possibility of accessing power. But, suddenly, the UCR reappeared showing a political and territorial organization far superior to that of the ruling party, and a great revolutionary decision, in the radical revolution of 1905, in which several units of the Army were involved. Exploded on February 4 of that year, it was relatively successful in Buenos Aires, Rosario, Córdoba, Bahía Blanca and Mendoza, but was quickly put down.

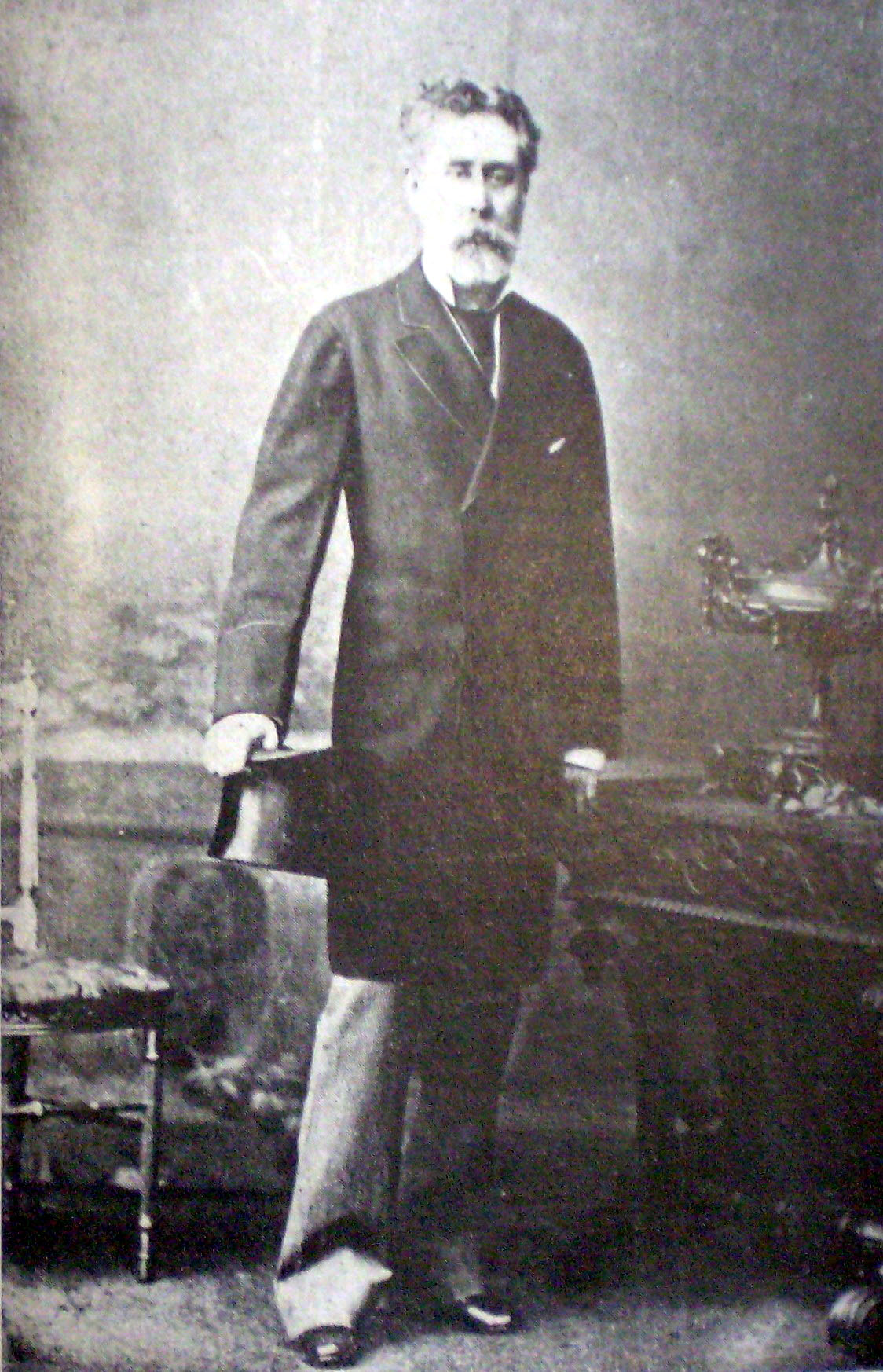
Photo by Manuel Quintana

=== Attempt on his life ===
On August 11, 1905, Quintana and his wife, Susana Rodríguez Viana, suffered an attack against their lives, when Salvador Planas y Virella, a Catalan anarchist, shot at the presidential vehicle, but he could not carry out his task due to a failure in the pistol he used. Planas declared that he acted alone and that his motivation was to avenge the workers killed during the demonstration on May 21 of that year. He was arrested and during the trial in September 1907 the defense alleged mental instability. Planas was sentenced to 10 years in prison for attempted murder. On January 6, 1911, he fled the Buenos Aires National Penitentiary with the anarchist Francisco Solano Regis, who had attacked President José Figueroa Alcorta, Quintana's successor.

== Health and death ==
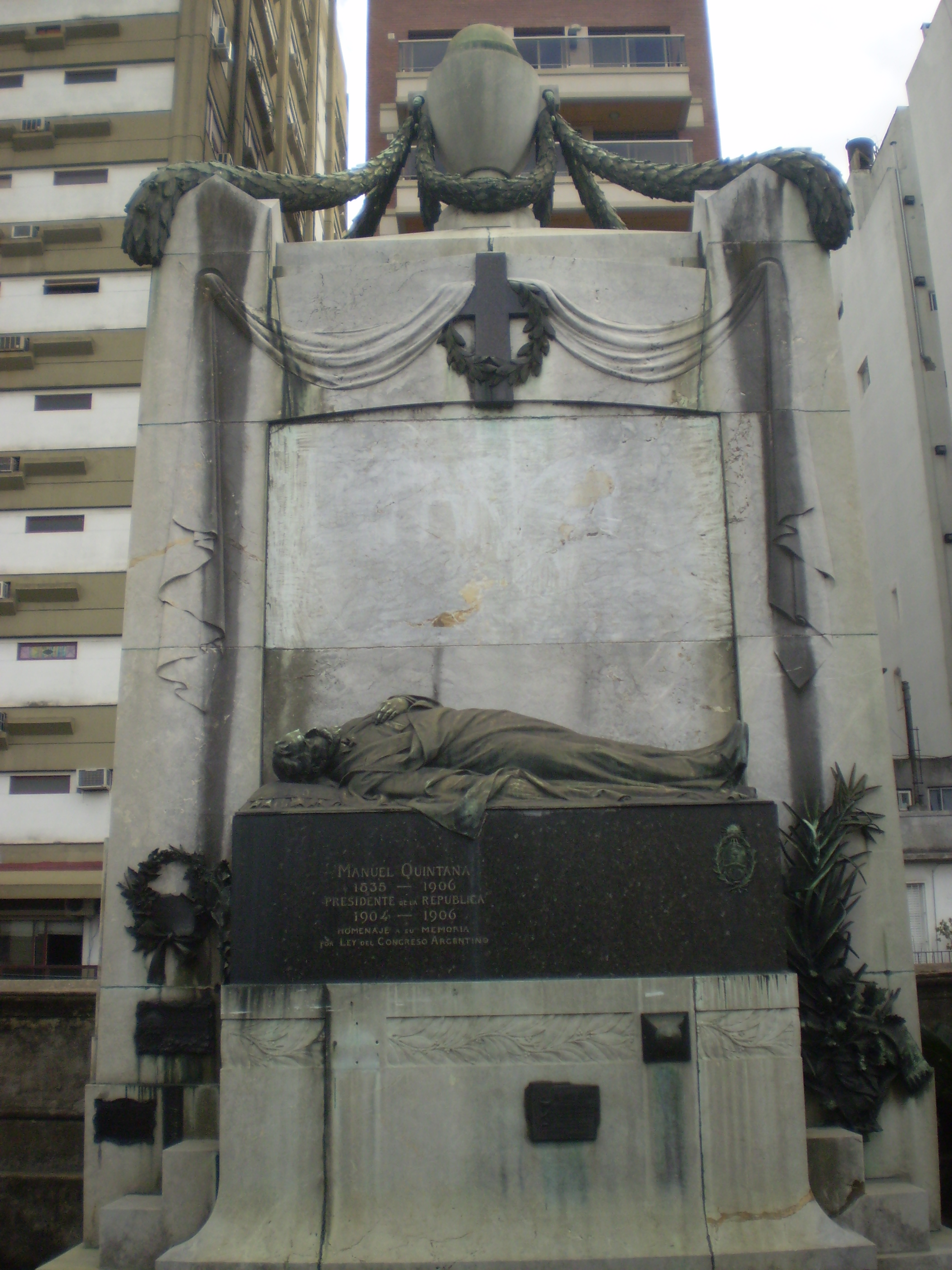
Manuel Quintana's tomb in the Recoleta Cemetery

The stress suffered by the president during the revolution and the subsequent attempt on his life damaged his health. As a consequence, he reduced his working hours to a minimum, which complicated his administration.

Despite all attempts, Quintana's health continued to deteriorate, so on January 25, 1906, Quintana decided to take a license, delegating the position on an interim basis to Vice President Figueroa Alcorta. Quintana retired to a farm in the current Belgrano neighborhood, to rest and try to improve his health.

However, Quintana was already very old, and finally died on March 12, 1906, becoming the first Argentine president to die in office. His remains rest in the Recoleta Cemetery.

=== Legacy ===
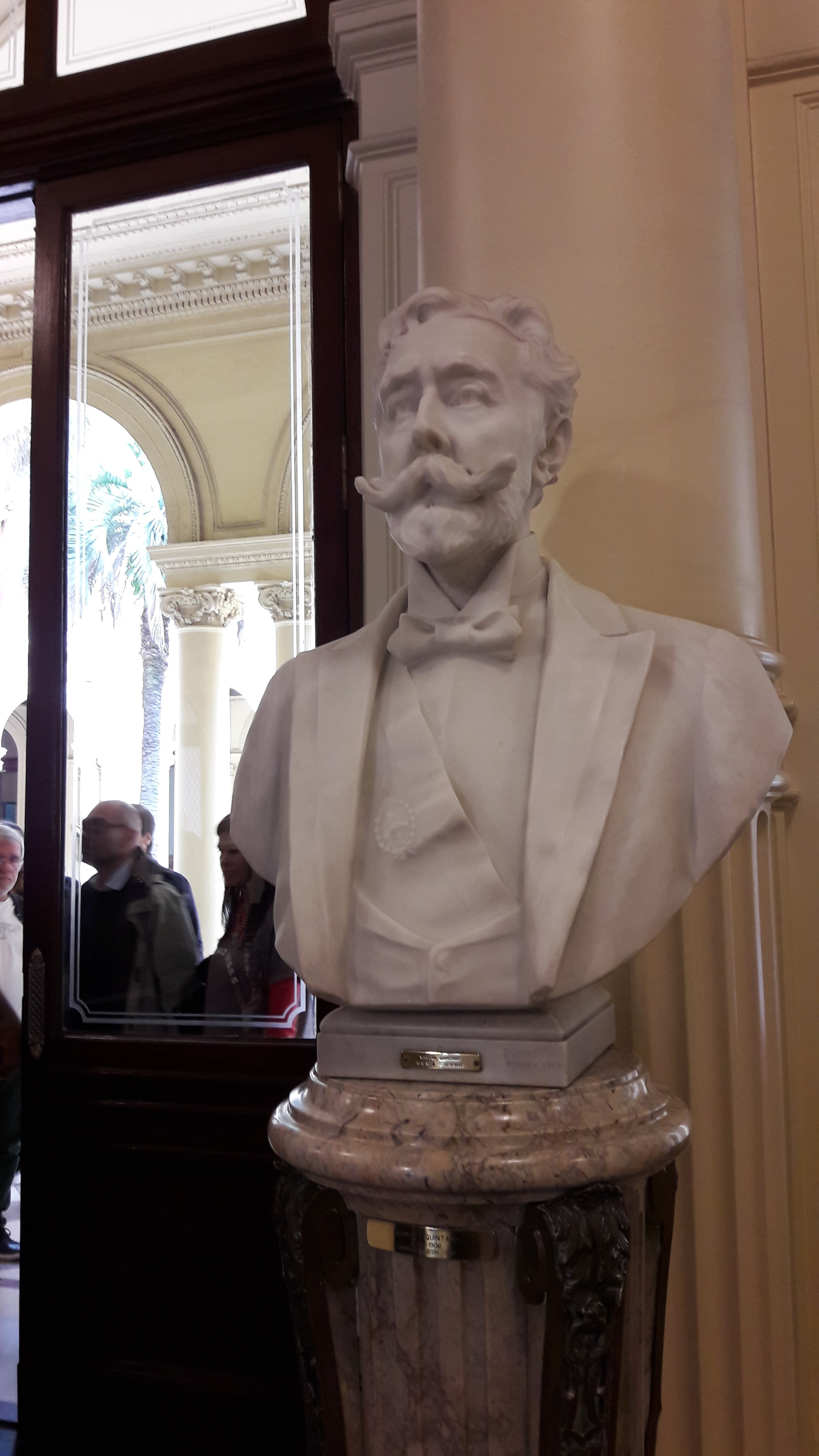
Bust of Manuel Quintana in the room of the busts of the Casa Rosada

Quintana's portrait was featured on the five hundred thousand austral banknote that circulated during the hyperinflation in Argentina from 1989 to 1991.

Political offices
Preceded by Julio A.Roca	President of Argentina; 1904–1906	Succeeded by José Figueroa
