= Argentine Revolution of 1905 =

Argentine political uprising

Revolution of 1905
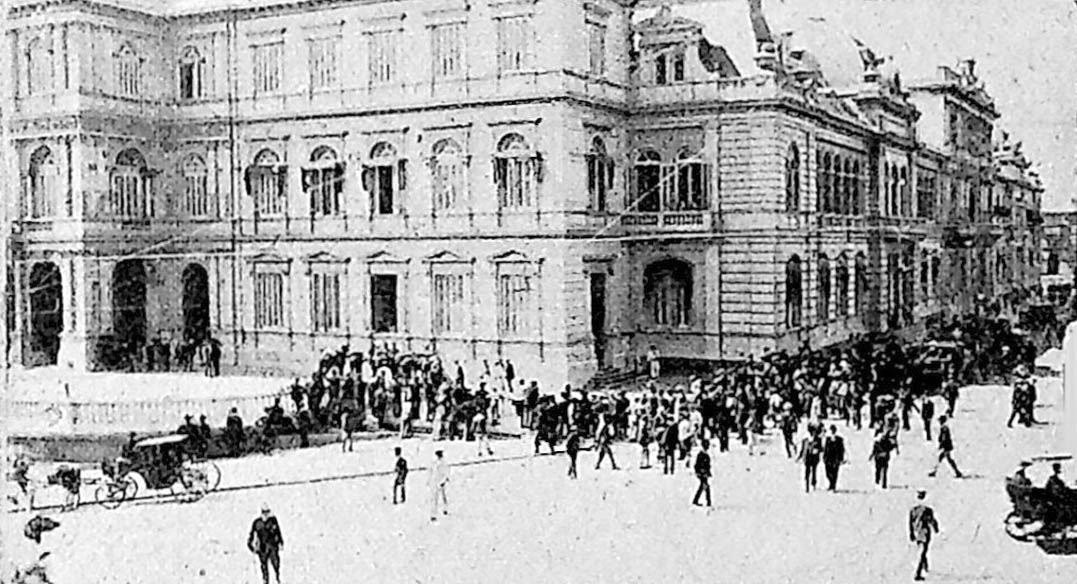
| Date | 4–8 February 1905 |
| Location | Buenos Aires, Santa Fe, Cordoba and Mendoza, Argentina |
| Action | Attempt to depose the government of the National Autonomist Party. |
| Result | Revolution crushed by the government. |

Government-Insurgents
| Government of Argentina: National Autonomist Party | Radical Civic Union |

Commanders and leaders
| (Argentina) Manuel Quintana | Hipólito Yrigoyen |

The Argentine Revolution of 1905 also known as the Radical Revolution of 1905 (Spanish: Revolución radical de 1905) was a civil-military uprising organized by the Radical Civic Union and headed by Hipólito Yrigoyen against the oligarchic dominance known as the Roquismo led by Julio Argentino Roca and his National Autonomist Party.

== Background ==
After successive defeats suffered in the revolutions of 1890 and 1893, and not having achieved free and fair elections, the Radical Civic Union entered a serious crisis, which deepened after 1896 with the suicide of Leandro N. Alem and the death of Aristóbulo del Valle. In 1897, Hipólito Yrigoyen, profoundly disagreeing with the direction of agreements imposed by Bernardo de Irigoyen, dissolved the Committee of the RCU in the province of Buenos Aires, due to which the radical party practically ceased to exist.

The dissolution of the Radical Civic Union resulted in the formation of a core of radical elements that recognized as their leader Hipólito Yrigoyen. Onto this core - composed of young men, recruited from the middle class, professionals, businessmen, employees, ranchers of the old federal tradition, settlers and laborers from the countryside - was Yrigoyen able to impose discipline and enthusiasm. In this context, in 1903, Hipólito Yrigoyen began his revival and reorganization.

On February 29, 1904, after 7 years of inactivity, the National Committee of the Radical Civic Union said the electoral abstention of all the radicals of the Republic in the elections of representatives from the nation, senators from the capital, electors for president and vice president of the nation, and announced an armed resistance.

"...to persevere in the fight until this abnormal and forced situation radically changes, through the means that your patriotism inspires."

In the government was President Manuel Quintana, representing the National Autonomist Party, the country's most affluent groups.

== Development of the conflict ==
On February 4, 1905, in the federal capital (Buenos Aires), Campo de Mayo, Bahía Blanca, Mendoza, Cordoba, and Santa Fe, saw the armed uprising that had been coming, with almost the same flags as in 1890 and 1893. A state of siege was proclaimed throughout the country for ninety days.

This was one of the most important rebellions that the Republic suffered, for the number of troops involved, the forces involved, and the extent of the movement. Yrigoyen and his group had been working in great secrecy, but despite that, the government was advised of the situation.

In the Federal Capital, the repressive measures crushed the movement at its inception. The revolutionaries failed by not being able to secure control of the arsenal in Buenos Aires when General Carlos Smith, chief of Army Staff, rooted out the Radical soldiers. The loyalist troops and police stations soon recovered after being taken by surprise.

In Cordoba, revolutionaries took prisoners to the vice president José Figueroa Alcorta who was forced to hold a brief conference with President Manuel Quintana, requesting pardons in exchange for his life, but the president did not give in, and the threat was not carried out. In the same raid, revolutionaries attempted to detain the former president Julio Argentino Roca, who, having been warned of the circumstances, tried to escape to Santiago del Estero, but they arrested his son Julio Argentino Pascual Roca after all.

In Mendoza, the rebels took 300,000 pesos from the National Bank and attacked the barracks defended by Lieutenant Basil Pertiné. Rebel troops in Bahia Blanca and elsewhere had no perspective, neither found an echo in the people. President Manuel Quintana used the same tactic used in 1893 to quell the radical movement, the state of siege became martial law.

Only the provinces of Cordoba and Mendoza continued fighting until February 8, however, the divisions of the army, loyal to the government, quickly vanquished the revolution under the strong and quick orders of President Quintana.

After the events of the month of February, Quintana went to Congress and said, "Since receiving me, the government has known about the conspiracy that was brewing in the army and therefore directed that incitement to unrest in order to maintain external the political agitations, at the same time invoking the example of their ancestors and the glory of their arms. Some of the junior officers refused to listen to me, preferring to launch into an adventure, which does not excuse the inexperience before the inflexible duties of the soldier. "

The government of President Manuel Quintana stopped and ordered prosecuted the rebels, who were convicted with sentences of up to 8 years in prison and were sent to Ushuaia prison.

== Consequences ==
The repression was carried out simultaneously against the revolutionaries and the socialist labor movement and its organizations, its media, etc., even though they had no links with the movement of February 4. By contrast, the Socialist Party (Argentina) agreed to invite the working class to stay away from these quarrels, which were promoted by excessive thirst for command and petty ambitions.

Hundreds of gathered workers were arrested, the socialist and anarchist press was banned, they raided the premises of the newspaper La Vanguardia and La Protesta among others, and local unions were closed down. The Socialist Party and labor organizations, the General Workers' Union and the Argentine Regional Workers' Federation, requested permission to conduct a protest rally. On May 21, 1905, a demonstration consisting of thousands of workers gathered at Constitution Square and marched from there to the Plaza Lavalle, where the concentration was attacked with bullets and sabers, leaving a balance of two dead, twenty wounded and many bruised in the square.

On August 11, 1905, there was an attack against Quintana, while his coach went on to Government House, a man fired several times at Quintana. The president's coach continued on, and the custody officers arrested the perpetrator, who was a Catalan laborer named Salvador Planas y Virelles, sympathetic anarchist who acted on his own initiative.

The revolution was defeated, but it would unleash a wave of institutional change within the ruling party that could not be stopped. Julio Roca's followers were divided, and both Carlos Pellegrini and Roque Sáenz Peña understood the need for deep institutional changes to contain the increasing social and political conflict.

In 1906, with the death of President Quintana and the assumption of his vice president, José Figueroa Alcorta, Congress issued Law No. 4939 giving general amnesty to all participants in the revolution of 1905. In 1912, the Sáenz Peña Law granted the Radicals' demand for secret ballots and universal male suffrage. Hipólito Yrigoyen was elected president in 1916, ending decades of Autonomist rule.

== Bibliography ==
- Cárdenas, Eduardo; Paya, Carlos (1975). En camino a la democracia política, 1904-1910. Buenos Aires: La Bastilla. ISBN 950-25-0000-8.
- Luna, Félix (1964). Yrigoyen. Buenos Aires: Desarrollo.
- Pigna, Felipe (2005). Los mitos de la historia argentina 2. Buenos Aires: Planeta. ISBN 950-49-1342-3.
- Lanata, Jorge (2003). Argentinos Tomo: 2. Buenos Aires: Ediciones B Argentina. ISBN 950-15-2259-8.
- Castro, Nelson (2005). Enfermos de poder. Buenos Aires: Vergara. ISBN 950-15-2371-3.
