= Argentine Revolution of 1893 =

Revolution in Argentina

Revolution of 1893
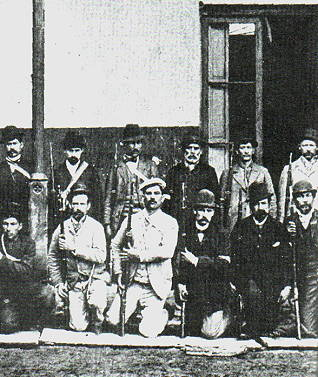
Date	First: 28 July – 25 August 1893; Second: 7 September – 1 October 1893
Location	Buenos Aires, Santa Fe, San Luis, Tucumán and Corrientes, Argentina
Action	Attempt to depose the fraudulent government of the National Autonomist Party and to call national elections.
Result	Revolution crushed by the government.
Territorial changes	Revolutionaries temporarily took power of the provinces of Buenos Aires, Santa Fe, San Luis, Tucumán and Corrientes.; Alem was proclaimed president in Rosario.

Government-Insurgents
Government of Argentina; National Autonomist Party	Radical Civic Union

Commanders and leaders
(Argentina) Carlos Pellegrini (Argentina) Julio Argentino Roca	Hipólito Yrigoyen; Leandro Alem; Aristóbulo del Valle

The Argentine Revolution of 1893, or the Radical Revolution of 1893, was a failed insurrection by members of the Radical Civic Union (UCR) against the government of Argentina, then controlled by the National Autonomist Party (PAN). It continued the goals of the Revolution of the Park of 1890, whose themes were further echoed in the Revolution of 1905.

In 1890, Bartolomé Mitre and Leandro N. Alem formed the Civic Union, which orchestrated the Revolution of the Park and forced the resignation of president Miguel Ángel Juárez Celman of the PAN in favor of his vice president, Carlos Pellegrini. Mitre himself stood for president for the 1892 elections, but sought accommodation with the PAN, leading Alem to break off and found the UCR in 1891. On April 2, 1892, barely a week before the election, Pellegrini declared a state of siege and arrested Alem and other opposition leaders, resulting in the overwhelming election of PAN candidate Luis Sáenz Peña.

In the aftermath, the UCR split into factions led by Alem (los líricos, "the Lyricists") and by his nephew and protégé, Hipólito Yrigoyen (los rojos, "the Reds"). Yrigoyen and his political brother Aristóbulo del Valle believed the UCR should take power through provincial rebellions, as opposed to a coup d'état of the national government.

== First phase: July–August ==
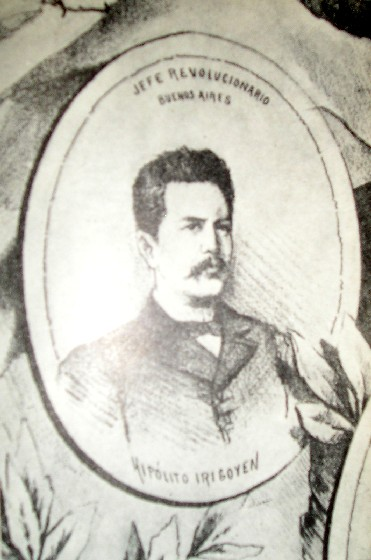
Hipólito Yrigoyen, conducted the revolution in Buenos Aires Province and installed a revolutionary governor.

In 1893, with his government weak, Sáenz Peña invited del Valle to serve as Minister of War, with additional functions giving him almost the power of a prime minister. This presented an unbeatable opportunity for the UCR. The first armed insurrection began on July 28 in San Luis Province, directed by Teófilo Saa. The revolutionaries quickly took control, forcing the governor to resign and installing Saa as interim governor.

A second insurrection broke out in Santa Fe on July 30. After several days of bloody fighting, the revolutionaries, led by Lisandro de la Torre and others, defeated the provincial government, headed by Juan Manuel Cafferata—one of the few PAN members who had assumed power legitimately. On August 4, they installed radical Mariano Candioti as governor.

The rebellion in Buenos Aires Province, led by Yrigoyen himself, was the largest and best-organized. It began simultaneously in 82 cities, at dawn on July 30. The radical army ended up with 8,000 well-armed men, under the direct command of Marcelo T. de Alvear at first and Martin Yrigoyen later. Their headquarters was in Temperley, in the vicinity of the city of Buenos Aires. The revolution triumphed everywhere in the province. On August 8 they took the capital and installed as interim governor Juan Carlos Belgrano.

Soon after, however, they made several strategic errors. First, del Valle (supported by Yrigoyen) refused to depose Sáenz Peña in a coup, as demanded by Alem and most of the other radical leaders. He proposed instead a plan for free elections which was approved by the Senate but defeated in the Chamber of Deputies. Second, Yrigoyen freed Pellegrini, who had been arrested in Haedo by the revolutionaries. Once released, Pellegrini returned to the capital and rallied PAN supporters.

Third, del Valle left the Casa Rosada for Temperley, to be present at the surrender of arms. On August 11, Pellegrini and Julio Argentino Roca took the opportunity to go to the Congress and win support for the suppression of the insurrections in Buenos Aires, San Luis and Santa Fe, all held by revolutionary governments. Alem urged del Valle to lead the radical army back to Buenos Aires and stage a coup. Instead, del Valle resigned from the cabinet on August 12, being replaced by roquista Manuel Quintana.

On August 25 the State Committee of the Radical Civic Union decided to surrender their weapons and the revolution effectively stopped.

== Second phase: August 14–September ==
On August 14, 1893, two days after the resignation of Aristóbulo del Valle, an uprising in Corrientes Province ousted the governor there. Alem, considering the revolution far from defeated, and anticipating a massive uprising, decided to start out from Rosario. Yrigoyen, however, felt this movement was not well-grounded and denied the support of the Radical army, a move the Radical remnant considered a betrayal.

The Alem-led uprising was poorly conceived and poorly organized. On September 7, radical commander Bello revolted in Tucumán Province and imposed a revolutionary government under Eugenio Mendez. On September 24, Candioti returned to Santa Fe at the head of a combined army of regulars and irregulars. The national government decided to respond firmly and sent a powerful army under Pelligrini, who obtained the surrender of the revolutionary on September 25. Alem arrived the same day in Rosario, having hidden in a cargo ship, to great acclaim, with a popular assembly declaring him president of the nation and an army of 6,000 being raised. On September 26, the crew of the El Plata-class monitor ARA Los Andes, en route from Tigre to Santa Fe with arms to support the government troops, mutinied, led by frigate lieutenant Gerardo Valotta. Valotta sailed the ship to Rosario and gave the arms to the insurrectionist army instead.

Manuel García Mansilla, commanding the torpedo ship ARA Espora, engaged the Los Andes in the Battle of El Espinillo on September 29, on the Paraná River north of Rosario. The riverine battleship ARA Independencia under the command of Edelmiro Correa joined the battle, soon hitting Los Andes and forcing the crippled ship to limp into the harbor. Valotta surrendered early the next morning.

Roca assumed command of the army at Rosario, threatened to bombard the city unless the rebels surrendered. Alem fled, with the remaining rebels surrendering to Garcia Mansilla and Correa, effectively putting an end to the Revolution.

Alem was captured on October 1 and imprisoned for six months. He stood in the 1894 legislative elections, becoming national deputy in 1895, but committed suicide the following July.

== See also ==
- Revolution of the Park

== Bibliography ==
- CABRAL, César Augusto (1967). Alem: informe sobre la frustración argentina. Buenos Aires: A. Peña Lillo.
- LUNA, Félix (1964). Yrigoyen. Buenos Aires: Desarrollo.
