= QF 3-pounder Nordenfelt =

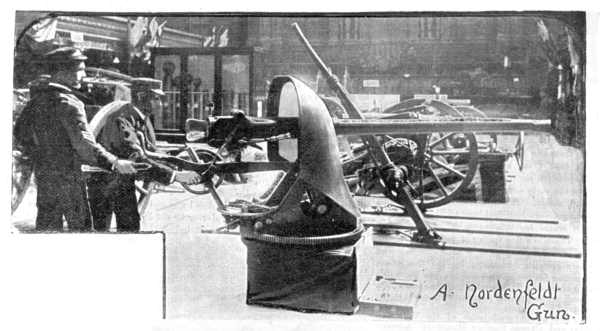
- At Melbourne Town Hall, 1895
- Type: Naval gun Coast defence gun
- Place of origin: United Kingdom

Service history
- In service: 1885–19??
- Used by: Many countries

Production history
- Designed: 1885
- Manufacturer: Nordenfelt Guns and Ammunition Company; Maxim-Nordenfelt

Specifications
- Mass: UK 45-cal version : 452 pounds (205 kg) barrel & breech
- Length: 45 calibres
- Shell: Fixed QF
- Shell weight: 3 lb 4 oz (1.5 kg)
- Calibre: 47-millimetre (1.850 in)
- Breech: Vertical sliding-block with locking wedge
- Muzzle velocity: 1,959 ft/s (597 m/s)
- Maximum firing range: 4,000 yd (3,700 m)

The QF 3-pounder Nordenfelt was a light 47 mm quick-firing naval gun and coast defence gun of the late 19th century used by many countries.

== United Kingdom ==
The United Kingdom only deployed this gun for coast defence, and soon discarded it in favour of the similar QF 3-pounder Hotchkiss gun for both coast defence and naval use.

== Ammunition ==
Ammunition was in "fixed rounds" : the projectile and brass cartridge case were loaded as a single unit. The gun used the same ammunition as the similar QF 3-pounder Hotchkiss, with either Nordenfelt or Hotchkiss fuzes. When introduced in the 1880s the propellant used was gunpowder, in British service Cordite Mark I was used as propellant from the mid-1890s onwards.

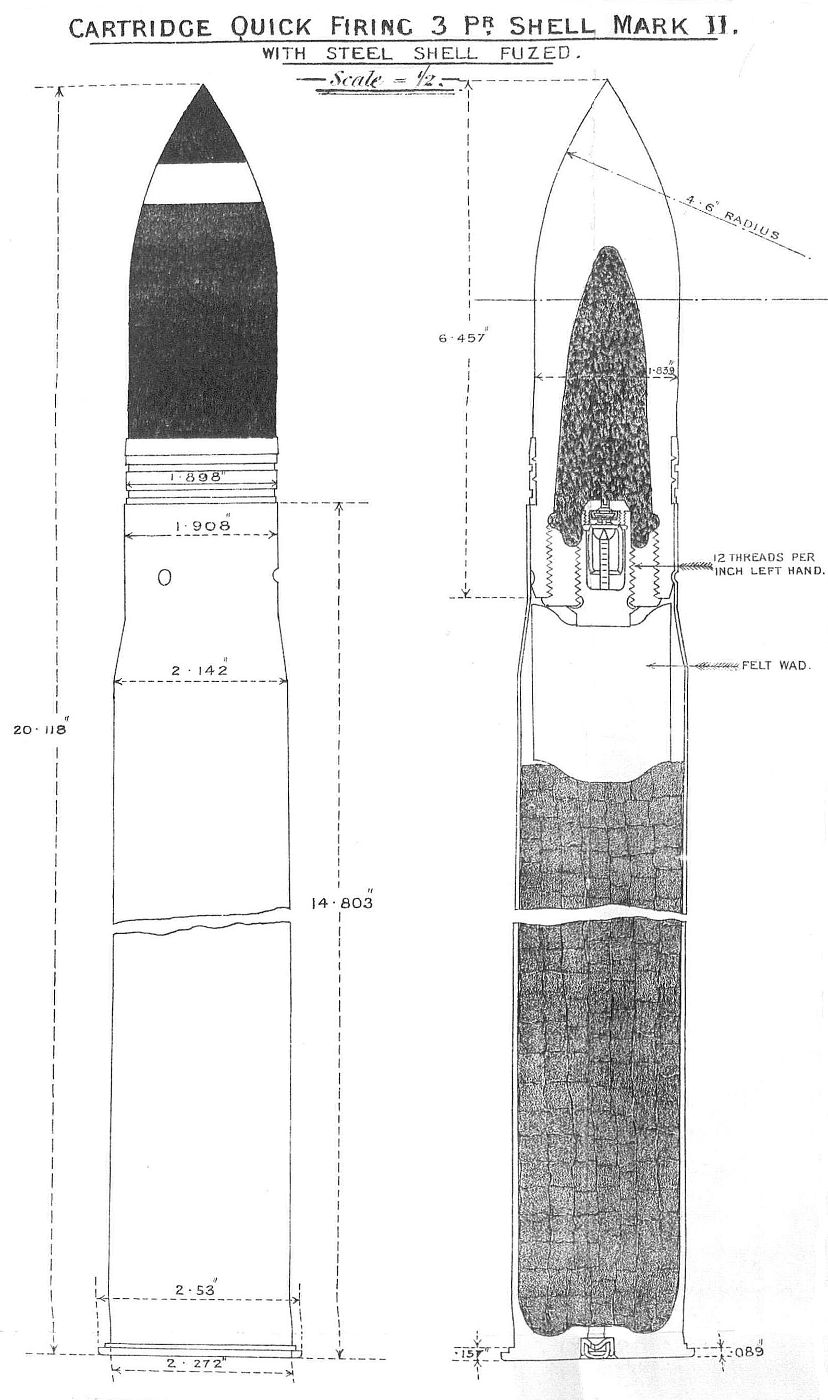
British steel shell round, 1891

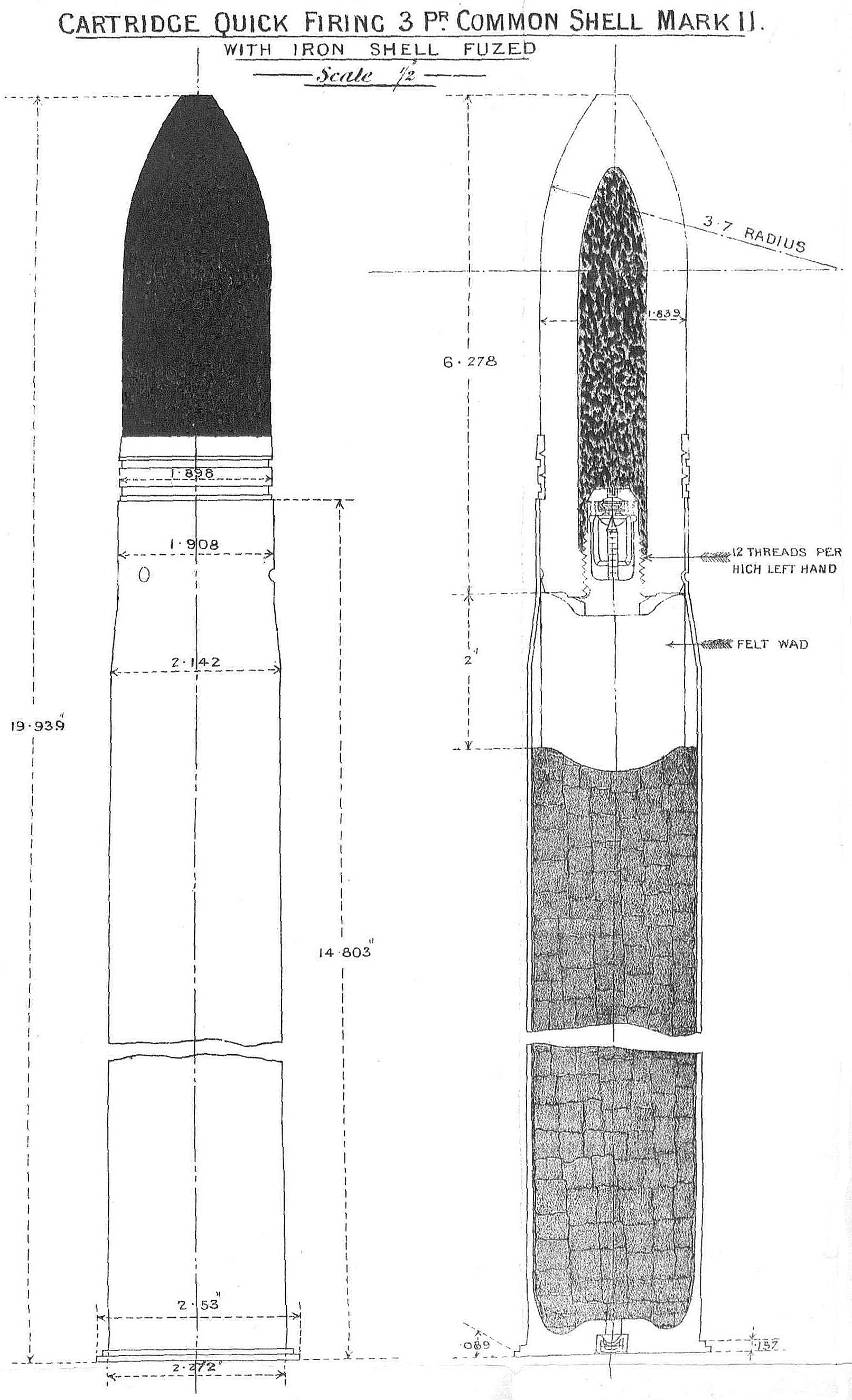
British common shell round, 1891

== See also ==
- List of naval guns

=== Weapons of comparable role, performance and era ===
- QF 3-pounder Hotchkiss – Hotchkiss equivalent

== Bibliography ==
- I.V. Hogg and L.F. Thurston, British Artillery Weapons & Ammunition 1914–1918. London: Ian Allan, 1972.
