= Governor of Mendoza Province =

Executive position in Argentina

- Provincial coat of Arms
- Style: Governor
- Status: Head of the local government
- Appointer: Direct popular vote
- Inaugural holder: José Moldes
- Formation: 1810

The Constitution (1916) of Mendoza Province, Argentina, states that the executive power of the province will be led by a citizen chosen as a governor by the people for a four-year term, and not allowed to be re-elected for the immediately following term.

Before it was constituted as a province in 1920, Mendoza Province was known as the Province of Cuyo. Before 1813, it was part of Córdoba Province. The office of governor came into existence when the independent province was created.

Since that time Mendoza Province has had almost a hundred governors, as well as other types of officials in charge of the executive power.

The office of the Governor of Mendoza is on the 4th floor of the Government House building, inside the Civic Center of the City of Mendoza. The Civic Center is a park with administrative buildings of the executive and judicial powers and the Mendoza Province Federal Court.

The office of the governor is commonly known as The Seat of San Martín, since José de San Martín was one of the first governors of the province. This was the only executive office that San Martín ever held in the history of Argentina.

== List of governors ==
=== Before the Sáenz Peña Law (1820–1914) ===
Portrait	Governor	Term	Political Party	Notes
	José Clemente Benegas	17 January – February 1820		
	Pedro José Campos	February – March 1820		
	José Clemente Benegas	March – 29 July 1820		
	Tomás Godoy Cruz	29 July 1820 – 7 May 1822		
	Pedro Molina	7 May 1822 – 29 April 1824		
	Juan Agustín Maza	29 – 30 April 1824		
	Triumvirate of the Province of Mendoza	30 April – 7 May 1824		
	Pedro Molina	7 May – 4 June 1824		
	José Albino Gutiérrez	4 – 8 June 1824		
	Juan Lavalle	8 June – 4 July 1824		
	Juan de Dios Correas	4 July 1824 – 8 November 1826		
	Juan Rege Corvalán	8 November 1826 – 10 August 1829		
	Rudecindo Alvarado	10 August – 18 August 1829		
	José Vicente Gil de Acosta Moyano y Silva	18 August – 23 Setiembre 1829		Provincial, National Deputy and Minister of Government
	Juan Rege Corvalán	23 September 1829 – 8 April 1830		
	Tomás Godoy Cruz	8 – 30 April 1830		
	José Videla Castillo	30 April 1830 – 5 April 1831		
	Manuel Lemos	5 April – 25 December 1831		
	Pedro Nolasco Ortiz	25 December 1831 – 4 August 1832		
	Pedro Molina	4 August 1832 – 20 March 1838		
	Justo Correas	20 March 1838 – 4 November 1840		
	Pedro Molina	4 November – 15 November 1840		
	Justo Correas	15 November 1840 – 16 May 1841		
	Juan Isidro Maza	16 May – 2 September 1841		
	José María Reina	2 – 5 September 1841		
	Gregorio Aráoz de Lamadrid	5 September – 24 November 1841		
	José Félix Aldao	24 November 1841 – 19 January 1845		
	Celedonio de la Cuesta	19 January – 10 February 1845		
	Pedro Pascual Segura	10 February 1845 – 4 April 1847		
	Alejo Mallea	4 April 1847 – 3 March 1852		
	Pedro Pascual Segura	3 March 1852 – 22 February 1856		
	Juan Cornelio Moyano	22 February 1856 – 25 March 1859		He was the first to hold the position according to the Provincial Constitution.
	Federico Maza	25 March – 16 April 1859		
	Pascual Echagüe	16 April – 23 August 1859		
	Laureano Nazar	23 August 1859 – 16 December 1861		Resigned.
	Juan de Dios Videla	16 December 1861 – 2 January 1862		Deposed by Domingo Faustino Sarmiento and fled to Chile.
	Hilario Correas	2 January 1862		
	Lino Almandoz	March – 29 July 1820		
	Luis Molina	2 January 1862 – 25 September 1863		Died in office.
	Domingo Bombal	25 September – 7 November 1863		
	Carlos González	7 November 1863 – 1 November 1866		
	Melitón Arroyo	1 – 11 November 1866		
	Carlos Juan Rodríguez	11 November 1866 – 11 April 1867		
	Melitón Arroyo	11 April – 11 July 1867		
	Ezequiel García	11 July – 16 October 1867		
	Nicolás Villanueva	16 October 1867 – 16 October 1870		
	Arístides Villanueva	16 October 1870 – 16 October 1873		
	Francisco Civit	16 October 1873 – 29 October 1874		
	Eliseo Marenco	29 October – 8 November 1874		
	Francisco Civit	8 November 1874 – 16 October 1876		
	Joaquín Villanueva	16 October 1876 – 24 December 1877		
	Julio Gutiérrez	24 December 1877 – 15 February 1878		
	Elías Villanueva	15 February 1878 – 15 February 1881		
	José Miguel Segura	15 February 1881 – 15 February 1884		
	Rufino Ortega	15 February 1884 – 15 February 1887	National Autonomist Party	
	Tiburcio Benegas	15 February 1887 – 6 January 1889	National Autonomist Party	
	Manuel J. Bermejo	6 January – early 1889	National Autonomist Party	
	Manuel Derqui	early 1889 – mid-1889	National Autonomist Party	
	Tiburcio Benegas	mid-1889 – 9 June 1889	National Autonomist Party	
	Jacinto Álvarez	9 June 1889 – mid-1889	National Autonomist Party	
	Deoclecio García	mid-1889 – end of 1889	National Autonomist Party	
	Domingo Bombal	end of 1889 – 10 June 1890	National Autonomist Party	
	Oseas Guiñazú	10 June 1890 – 15 October 1891	National Autonomist Party	Resigned.
	Pedro N. Ortiz	15 October 1891 – 25 January 1892	National Autonomist Party	
	Francisco Uriburu	25 January – 21 February 1892	National Autonomist Party	
	Deoclecio García	21 February – 6 August 1892	National Autonomist Party	Died in office.
	Pedro Anzorena	6 August 1892 – 31 December 1894	National Autonomist Party	Resigned.
	Jacinto Álvarez	31 December 1894 – mid-1895	National Autonomist Party	
	Tiburcio Benegas	mid – end of 1895	National Autonomist Party	
	Francisco Moyano	end of 1895 – 1898	National Autonomist Party	
	Emilio Civit	1898	National Autonomist Party	Resigned.
	Jacinto Álvarez	1898 – 1901	National Autonomist Party	
	Elías Villanueva	1901 – 1904	National Autonomist Party	
	Carlos Galigniana Segura	1904 – 1905	National Autonomist Party	Deposed after the Argentine Revolution of 1905.
	José Néstor Lencinas	1905	UCR Lencinista	De Facto Revolutionary Intervention
	Carlos Galigniana Segura	1905 – 1907	National Autonomist Party	Resumed his term.
	Emilio Civit	1907 – 6 March 1910	National Autonomist Party	
	Rufino Ortega Ozamis	6 March 1910 – 6 March 1914	National Autonomist Party	

=== After the Sáenz Peña Law (1914–Present) ===
Federal controller appointed by a democratic government.
Federal controller appointed by a de facto government .

Portrait	Governor	Term start	Term end	Party	Election	Notes
	Francisco S. Álvarez	6 March 1914	6 March 1918	La Liga Cívica	1913	
	José Néstor Lencinas	6 March 1918	17 February 1919	UCR Lencinista	1918	
	Tomás de Veyga	17 February 1919	12 April 1919	UCR	—	Federal controller (Hipólito Yrigoyen)
	Perfecto Araya	12 April 1919	25 July 1919	UCR	—	Federal controller (Hipólito Yrigoyen)
	José Néstor Lencinas	25 July 1919	20 January 1920	UCR Lencinista	1918	Retook office after federal intervention. Died in office.
	Ricardo Báez	20 January 1920	3 September 1920	UCR Lencinista	—	Provisional President of the Senate of Mendoza; took office after the death of José Néstor Lencinas.
	Eudoro Vargas Gómez	3 September 1920	4 February 1922	UCR	—	Federal controller (Hipólito Yrigoyen)
	Carlos Washington Lencinas	4 February 1922	9 October 1924	UCR Lencinista	1922	
	Enrique Mosca	9 October 1924	6 February 1926	UCRA	—	Federal controller (Marcelo T. de Alvear)
	Alejandro Orfila	6 February 1926	4 December 1928	UCR Lencinista	1926	
	Carlos A. Borzani	4 December 1928	7 September 1930	UCR	—	Federal controller (Hipólito Yrigoyen)
	Ergasto Saforcada	7 September 1930	25 September 1930	—	—	De facto federal controller (1930 Argentine coup d'état)
	José María Rosa	25 September 1930	18 February 1932	—	—	De facto federal controller (1930 Argentine coup d'état)
	Ricardo Videla	18 February 1932	18 February 1935	PD	1931	
	Guillermo G. Cano	18 February 1935	18 February 1938	PD	1935	
	Rodolfo Corominas Segura	18 February 1938	18 February 1941	PD	1938	
	Adolfo Vicchi	18 February 1941	4 June 1943	PD	1941	
	Humberto Sosa Molina	4 June 1943	11 June 1943	—	—	De facto federal controller (1943 Argentine coup d'état)
	Luis Elías Villanueva	11 June 1943	21 December 1943	—	—	De facto federal controller (1943 Argentine coup d'état)
	Aristóbulo Vargas Belmonte	21 December 1943	4 June 1946	—	—	De facto federal controller (1943 Argentine coup d'état)
	Faustino Picallo	4 June 1946	12 March 1949	UCR-JR	1946	
	Blas Brisoli	12 March 1949	4 June 1952	PP	1948	
	Carlos Horacio Evans	4 June 1952	18 September 1955	PP	1951	
	Roberto Nazar	18 September 1955	13 December 1955	—	—	De facto federal controller (Revolución Libertadora)
	Héctor Ladvocat	13 December 1955	7 May 1956	—	—	De facto federal controller (Revolución Libertadora)
	Isidoro Busquets	9 May 1956	1 May 1958	UCR	—	De facto federal controller (Revolución Libertadora)
	Ernesto Ueltschi	1 May 1958	1 May 1961	UCRI	1958	
	Francisco Gabrielli	1 May 1961	23 April 1962	PD	1961	
	Carlos Armanini	23 April 1962	5 June 1962	—	—	De facto federal controller (1962 Argentine coup d'état)
	Joaquín S. Guevara Civit	5 June 1962	6 February 1963	—	—	De facto federal controller (1962 Argentine coup d'état)
	Ricardo Alberto Parola	6 February 1963	9 February 1963	—	—	De facto federal controller (1962 Argentine coup d'état)
	Augusto Lavalle Cobo	9 February 1963	9 April 1963	—	—	De facto federal controller (1962 Argentine coup d'état)
	Horacio Pietrapera	9 April 1963	27 April 1963	—	—	De facto federal controller (1962 Argentine coup d'état)
	Sergio Moretti	27 April 1963	12 October 1963	—	—	De facto federal controller (1962 Argentine coup d'état)
	Francisco Gabrielli	12 October 1963	28 June 1966	PD	1963	
	Emilio Jofré	Elected but did not assume power		PD	1966	
	Tomás José Caballero	28 June 1966	22 July 1966	—	—	De facto federal controller (Argentine Revolution)
	José Eugenio Blanco	22 July 1966	8 June 1970	—	—	De facto federal controller (Argentine Revolution)
	Francisco Gabrielli	8 June 1970	4 April 1972	PD	—	De facto federal controller (Argentine Revolution)
	Luis Carlos Gómez Centurión	4 April 1972	14 April 1972	—	—	De facto federal controller (Argentine Revolution)
	Félix Gibbs	14 April 1972	22 March 1973	PD	—	De facto federal controller (Argentine Revolution)
	Ramón Genaro Díaz Bessone	22 March 1973	25 May 1973	—	—	De facto federal controller (Argentine Revolution)
	Alberto Martínez Baca	25 May 1973	6 June 1974	PJ	1973	Dismissed from office due to impeachment.
	Carlos Mendoza	6 June 1974	13 August 1974	PJ	1973	Lieutenant Governor, assumed office after the removal of Alberto Martínez Baca.
	Antonio Cafiero	13 August 1974	7 May 1975	PJ	—	Federal controller (Isabel Perón)
	Luis María Rodríguez	7 May 1975	3 November 1975	PJ	—	Federal controller (Isabel Perón)
	Pedro León Lucero	3 November 1975	24 March 1976	PJ	—	Federal controller (Isabel Perón)
	Tamer Yapur	24 March 1976	7 April 1976	—	—	De facto federal controller (National Reorganization Process)
	Jorge Sixto Fernández	7 April 1976	15 February 1980	—	—	De facto federal controller (National Reorganization Process)
	Rolando Ghisani	15 February 1980	20 January 1982	—	—	De facto federal controller (National Reorganization Process)
	Bonifacio Cejuela	20 January 1982	25 February 1983	PD	—	De facto federal controller (National Reorganization Process)
	Eliseo Vidart Villanueva	25 February 1983	10 December 1983	PD	—	De facto federal controller (National Reorganization Process)
	Santiago Llaver	10 December 1983	10 December 1987	UCR	1983	
	José Octavio Bordón	10 December 1987	10 December 1991	PJ	1987	
	Rodolfo Gabrielli	10 December 1991	10 December 1995	PJ	1991	
	Arturo Lafalla	10 December 1995	10 December 1999	PJ	1995	
	Roberto Iglesias	10 December 1999	10 December 2003	UCR	1999	
	Julio Cobos	10 December 2003	10 December 2007	UCR	2003	
	Celso Jaque	10 December 2007	10 December 2011	PJ	2007	
	Francisco Pérez	10 December 2011	10 December 2015	PJ	2011	
	Alfredo Cornejo	10 December 2015	10 December 2019	UCR	2015	
	Rodolfo Suárez	10 December 2019	9 December 2023	UCR	2019	
	Alfredo Cornejo	9 December 2023	Incumbent	UCR	2023	First person to be elected governor for a second term.

== See also ==
- Legislature of Mendoza
  - Senate of Mendoza
  - Chamber of Deputies of Mendoza
