= Julio Cobos =

Argentine politician (born 1955)

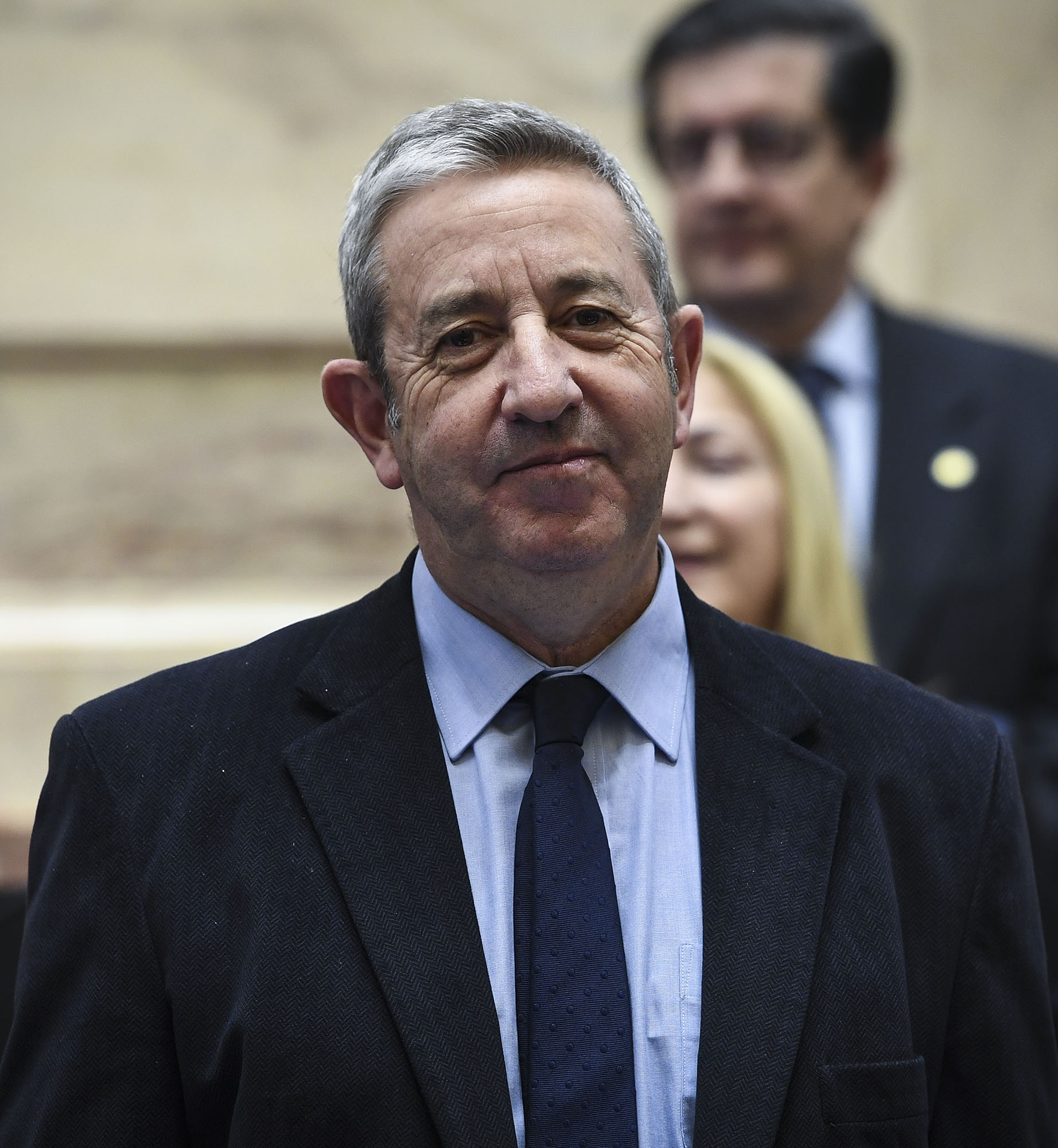
- Cobos in 2018

National Deputy
- Incumbent
- Assumed office 10 December 2021
- Constituency: Mendoza
- In office 10 December 2013 – 10 December 2015
- Constituency: Mendoza

National Senator
- In office 10 December 2015 – 10 December 2021
- Constituency: Mendoza

34th Vice President of Argentina
- In office 10 December 2007 – 10 December 2011
- President: Cristina Fernández de Kirchner
- Preceded by: Daniel Scioli
- Succeeded by: Amado Boudou

Governor of Mendoza
- In office 10 December 2003 – 10 December 2007
- Vice Governor: Juan Carlos Jaliff
- Preceded by: Roberto Iglesias
- Succeeded by: Celso Jaque

Personal details
- Born: 30 April 1955 (age 71) Mendoza, Argentina
- Party: Radical Civic Union
- Other political affiliations: Front for Victory (2007–2008); Plural Consensus (2008–2011); Progressive, Civic and Social Front (2013–2015); Juntos por el Cambio (2015–present)
- Spouse: Cristina Cerutti (m. 1980; div. 2016)
- Domestic partner: Natalia Obón (Since 2016)
- Children: 4
- Education: National Technological University
- Profession: Civil and construction engineer

Julio César Cleto Cobos (Spanish pronunciation: [ˈxuljo ˈkoβos]; born 30 April 1955) is an Argentine politician who was the Vice President of Argentina in the administration of President Cristina Fernández de Kirchner from 2007 to 2011. He started his political career as member of the Radical Civic Union party (UCR), becoming Governor of the Province of Mendoza in 2003. He was expelled from the UCR in 2007, and was then selected by presidential candidate Cristina Fernández de Kirchner, of the ruling Front for Victory (FpV), as her candidate for vice-president in the elections of that year, which they won.

His popular prestige got a big boost in 2008, when the Senate was voting on a controversial and contentious law to increase taxes on grain exports. The voting ended in a tie, which gave Cobos, as President of the Senate, the deciding vote. In a stunning and now notorious move, he voted against the law. This led to strong criticism from his party, who deemed him a traitor, and approval from sectors of the population that opposed the government. As he further distanced himself from the FPV, the UCR revoked his expulsion from the party.

Cobos was elected to the Chamber of Deputies in 2013, to the Senate in 2015, and again to the Chamber of Deputies in 2021.

== Biography ==
=== Early life ===
Julio Cobos was born in 1955 in the city of Godoy Cruz, Mendoza. His parents are Fermín and Asunción, and he has two older brothers. He studied high school in the Military Liceum, and later in the Universidad Tecnológica Nacional (UTN). He graduated from construction engineering in 1979 and civil engineering in 1988. In 1980 he got married with Cristina Cerutti, having three sons. He later stayed at the UTN as teacher.

He got promoted to Dean of the local chapter of the UTN, in the 1997-2001 term, but requested licence from 1999 to 2001 to work in politics. He was later reelected for the 2001-2005 term.

=== Governor of Mendoza: 2003–2007 ===
He joined the UCR in 1991 and took public office as an official in the municipality of Mendoza then as minister of Environment and Public Works in the government of Mendoza Province 1999–2000. He was dean of the regional faculty of the Universidad Tecnológica Nacional 1997–2003. He was elected governor in 2003, heading a coalition between Radicals with Recrear and Federalists.

After his election, Cobos became a leading supporter of Peronist President Néstor Kirchner in Radical ranks, taking a more left-wing position. He was in dispute with other Radicals in Mendoza, led by former governor Roberto Iglesias, then Radical leader, over his support for Kirchner and their desire to back another presidential candidate in the 2007 elections. Mendoza's constitution does not allow re-election; however Cobos supported Celso Jaque to take office in 2007 on the same slate as Kirchner.

=== Vice Presidency: 2007–2011 ===
Cobos was asked by Cristina Fernández de Kirchner to stand as her running mate in 2007 heading the Front for Victory slate. He accepted her offer and was consequently expelled by the UCR in July 2007. Having won the election, Cobos was sworn in as Vice President in December 2007.

Cobos, as Vice President and President of the Argentine Senate, cast the deciding vote rejecting an increase in grain export taxes. This controversial bill had led to economic and social instability in Argentina, with mass protests both for and against the government. Cobos had been expected to back President Fernández de Kirchner. "I think today is the most difficult day of my life", Cobos said. "They tell me I must go along with the government for institutional reasons, but my heart tells me otherwise. May history judge me, my vote is not for, it's against." Cobos has said that the move defused tensions in the country between farmers and the state.

Cobos managed to escape an attempted carjacking.

Cobos refused to step down, while Fernandez had not asked for his resignation, as his approval rating has been double that of hers in some polls. Cobos criticized her decision to nationalize more than $25 billion in private pension funds as premature and would only create more doubts among investors about the stability of Argentina's investment climate. Kirchner, in response, said publicly that every morning his wife asks him, "What vice president did you stick me with, Nestor?"

Some parts of the media considered him a potential presidential candidate for president in the 2011 elections since the raise of his public image during the voting in the Congress, though other parts of the media did not agree, saying his image was falling abruptly. Cobos initially maintained a quiet position about the topic, and declared his intentions to be candidate by the beginning of 2010.

In July 2010, he returned to the Radical Civic Union headquarters, where he was greeted by party officials Gerardo Morales, Ernesto Sanz, Ricardo Alfonsín and Oscar Aguad. They agreed to work on a plan to govern the country towards the 2011 full term elections.

Political offices
Preceded by Roberto Iglesias	Governor of Mendoza; 2003–2007	Succeeded by Celso Jaque
Preceded by Daniel Scioli	Vice President of Argentina; 2007-2011	Succeeded by Amado Boudou
