= Ernesto Sanz =

Argentine politician

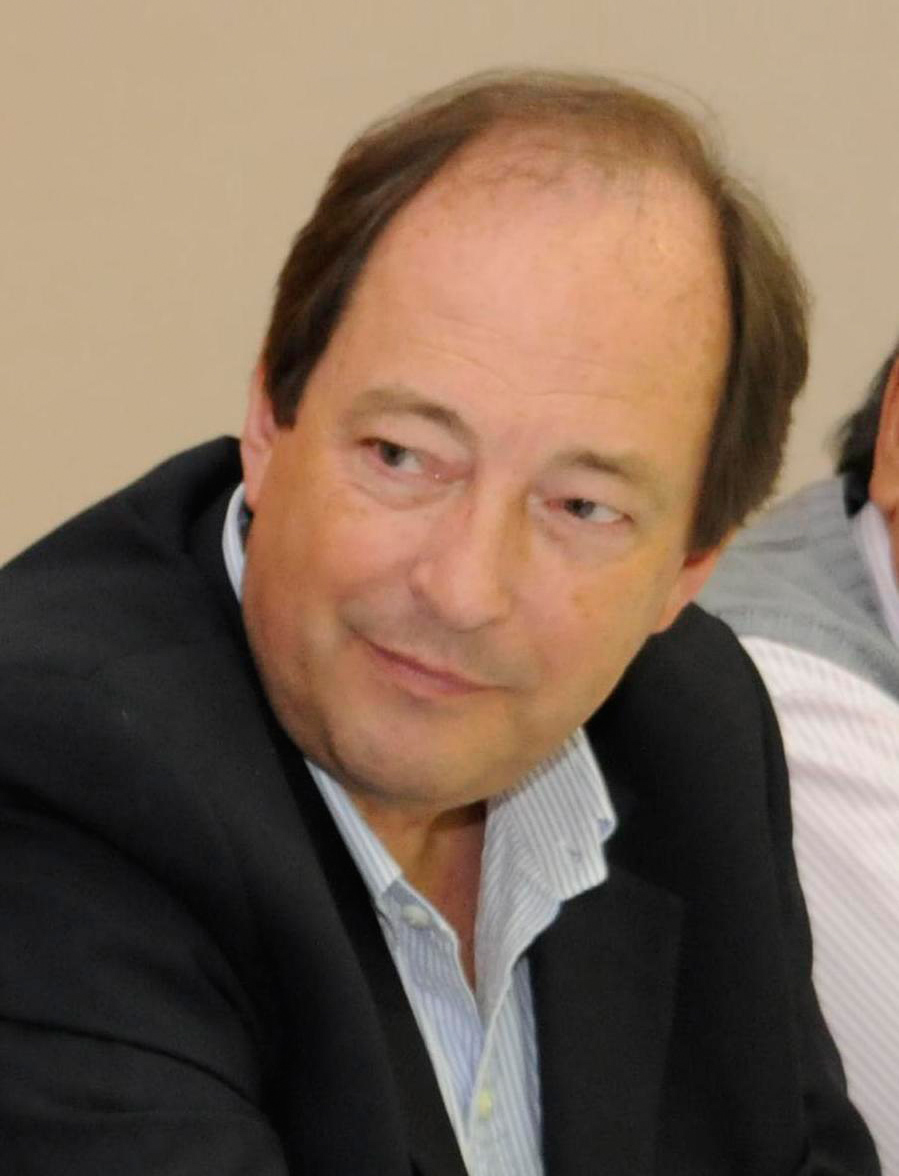

President of the National Committee of the Radical Civic Union
- In office 5 December 2009 – 16 December 2011
- Preceded by: Gerardo Morales
- Succeeded by: Mario Barletta
- In office 14 December 2013 – 4 December 2015
- Preceded by: Mario Barletta
- Succeeded by: José Manuel Corral

National Senator
- In office 10 December 2003 – 10 December 2015
- Constituency: Mendoza

Mayor of San Rafael
- In office 10 December 1999 – 10 December 2003

Provincial Senator of Mendoza
- In office 10 December 1993 – 10 December 1999

Personal details
- Born: 9 December 1956 (age 69) San Rafael, Mendoza Province Argentina
- Party: Radical Civic Union
- Other political affiliations: Cambiemos
- Spouse: Cristina Bessone
- Education: National University of the Littoral
- Profession: Lawyer

Ernesto Sanz (born 9 December 1956) is a former Argentine politician of the Radical Civic Union and one of the founders of Cambiemos. He served in the Argentine Senate representing Mendoza Province from 2003 to 2015.

== Early life and education ==
Sanz was born in San Rafael, Mendoza. He enrolled at the National University of the Littoral, and earned a law degree in 1981. Sanz married Cristina Bessone, and the couple had two children. Following the return of democracy in 1983, he became an adviser to the Governor of Mendoza, Santiago Llaver. He also taught at the National University of Cuyo Law School from 1984 to 1986, and maintained a private practice.

== Political career ==
He was elected to the UCR Youth Chapter's National Committee in 1987, and as President of the San Rafael Department chapter of the UCR in 1991. He served as a provincial senator from 1993, acting as President of the UCR caucus from 1995, and in 1999 became mayor of San Rafael.

=== National Senator ===
Sanz was elected Senator for Mendoza in 2003. He joined the Senate Budget and Domestic Economic Policy committees, and later the Constitutional, Investment, Argentina-Chile relations, and Federal Budget Sharing committees, among others. He was elected ranking member of the Budget Committee, and in 2007, leader of the UCR Senate caucus. Sanz ran for Vice-Governor with Roberto Iglesias in 2007; the ticket, however, was defeated by Justicialist Party candidate Celso Jaque, and finished in fourth place with 10% of the vote. Sanz suffered an automobile accident in March 2008 while driving along the Atuel River in Mendoza; he recovered quickly. Sanz was reelected to the Senate in a landslide in 2009.

=== UCR National Committee president ===
In December 2009, Sanz was elected President of the UCR National Committee. On 2 March 2011 he announced his candidacy for the UCR presidential primary scheduled for 30 April. His chief opponent, Congressman Ricardo Alfonsín, was described by Sanz as "an appeal to nostalgia" (in reference to the latter's father, former President Raúl Alfonsín). Sanz withdrew shortly before the 30 April primary, however, and Alfonsín himself placed third in the 2011 general election.

The UCR organized the Broad Front UNEN political coalition, but it stayed behind in the opinion polls for the 2015 elections.

At the radical convention on 14 March 2015 in Gualeguaychú (Entre Ríos), Sanz and Cobos presented their proposals: Cobos proposed a front of center-left parties, while Ernesto Sanz proposed that the Radical Civic Union lead a broad coalition opposing Kirchnerism for the presidential elections of 25 October, which includes the Civic Coalition ARI led by Elisa Carrió and the Republican Proposal (PRO) led by Mauricio Macri.

Cobos, supported by Gerardo Morales and Deputy Ricardo Alfonsin, obtained 130 votes, while the position held by those who supported Sanz reached 186 votes.

The UCR joined Macri's Republican Proposal to create the Cambiemos coalition. Macri, Sanz and Carrió ran for the coalition's primary election, which was won by Macri. Macri won the presidential elections afterwards.

Macri publicly offered Sanz the post of minister of Justice, but Sanz declined, citing personal reasons in an open letter published on 23 November 2015.
