= Lencinas =

Lencinas is a surname. Notable people with the surname include:

- Carlos Washington Lencinas (1888–1929), Argentine politician, son of José
- José Néstor Lencinas (1859–1920), Argentine politician
- Leandro Lencinas (born 1995), Argentine footballer

== See also ==
- Lencina
