= Haedo =

Haedo may refer to:

Places

- Haedo, Buenos Aires, city located in Morón Partido, Buenos Aires Province, Argentina

People

- Eduardo Víctor Haedo (1901–1970), President of Uruguay
- Juan José Haedo (born 1981), Argentine professional road racing cyclist and former track cyclist
- Lucas Sebastián Haedo (born 1983), Argentine professional road racing cyclist
- Nelson Haedo Valdez (born 1983), Paraguayan footballer
- José María Paz (1791–1854), General Brigadier José María Paz y Haedo

Other

- National Technological University – Haedo Regional Faculty, faculty of the Universidad Tecnológica Nacional of Argentina
