= Ueltschi =

Ueltschi is a surname. Notable people with the surname include:

- Albert Lee Ueltschi (1917–2012), American aviator
- Ernesto Ueltschi (1922–2014), Argentine politician, lawyer and teacher
