= Arturo Lafalla =

Argentine politician

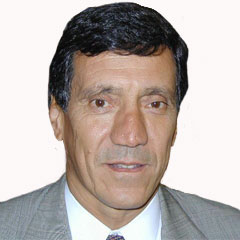
- Arturo Lafalla, Governor of Mendoza between 1995 and 1999 and National Deputy between 1999 and 2003.

Governor of Mendoza
- In office 1995–1999
- Preceded by: Rodolfo Gabrielli
- Succeeded by: Roberto Iglesias

Personal details
- Born: 4 June 1944 (age 82) San Rafael
- Party: Justicialist Party
- Profession: Academic

Arturo Lafalla (born in 1944) is an Argentine politician of the Justicialist Party, in Mendoza Province.

Lafalla was born in San Rafael, Mendoza, and educated at the Marist College of San José. He graduated from the National University of Cuyo, and taught at his alma mater for a number of years. He was chosen as the running mate for Justicialist Party gubernatorial nominee José Octavio Bordón, as served as the latter's Vice Governor from 1987 to 1991.

Appointed Minister of the Environment by Governor Rodolfo Gabrielli, Lafalla was elected governor of Mendoza in 1995. His tenure was marked by the privatization of numerous state enterprises, including the Bank of Mendoza, the provincial pension fund, the water works (OSM), and the electricity distribution company (Edemsa), among others. The proceeds financed the construction of Los Potrerillos Dam, though a number of privatized concerns would suffer from subsequent mismanagement, notably the Bank of Mendoza.

Lafalla was elected to the Argentine Chamber of Deputies in 1999, and served until 2003. His protégé in the provincial government, Celso Jaque, was elected governor in 2007, and in 2010, Lafalla published a reflection on his tenure as governor, Utopía y Realidad.

Political offices
Preceded by Rodolfo Gabrielli	Governor of Mendoza; 1995 – 1999	Succeeded by Roberto Iglesias
