= Sebastian Kind =

Argentine public official

Sebastian Alejandro Kind
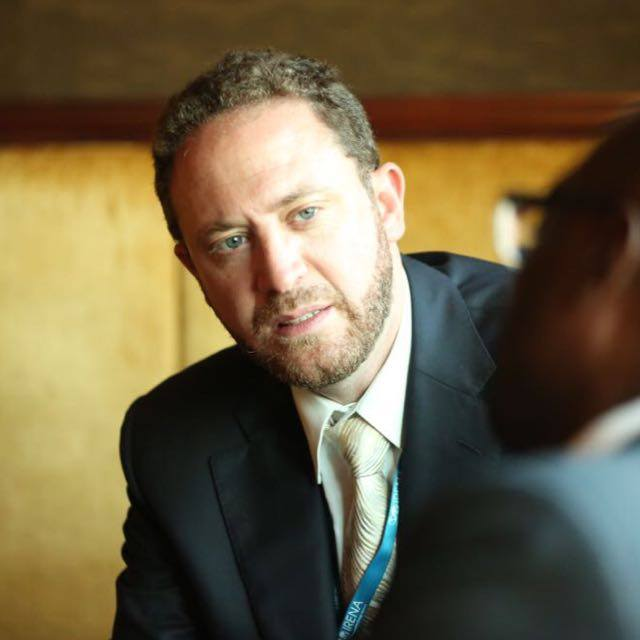
- Born: 1979 (age 46–47)
- Citizenship: Argentina
- Education: National Technological University (UTN)
- Occupations: Former Undersecretary of Renewable Energy of Argentina (2016-2019), Current CEO of GREENMAP
- Children: 2

Sebastian Alejandro Kind (born 1979) is an Argentinian engineer, policymaker and advisor. He served as Undersecretary of Renewable Energy at the Ministry of Energy in Argentina between 2016 and 2019. Kind led the country's energy transition towards a cleaner matrix through a program titled RenovAr. In 2018, he was appointed as Chair of the Council of the International Renewable Energy Agency (IRENA).

== Career and education ==
Kind attended the National Technological University of Buenos Aires (Argentina), where he completed his Bachelors degree in Mechanical Engineering.

In 2010, he founded the MS in Renewable Energy at the National Technological University (Argentina) and served as director until 2017.

Between 2013 and 2015, he performed as an advisor to the Senate and drafted Act 27,191, that was unanimously approved by Congress. This law set the policy framework and objectives that he is currently putting in practice as a government official.

Throughout the course of his tenure as Undersecretary of Renewable Energy, he was responsible for the drafting of the regulatory framework for renewables including the enovar, the FODER trust fund and the PPA regulation, among others. During Argentina's G20 presidency in 2018, he co-led the first Forum on renewable energy and energy efficiency at the Energy Transitions Working Group (ETWG) meetings in Buenos Aires. Kind earned MS in Renewable Energy from the EUREC Agency in Brussels (Belgium)/ NTUA in Athens (Greece)/University of Zaragoza (Spain).

== Awards and fellowships ==
In 2018, he was appointed as Chair of the Council of the International Renewable Energy Agency (IRENA), and was selected as Fellow of the Eisenhower Foundation (EF) in Philadelphia and as Global Leader of the World Economic Forum (WEF) in Geneva in recognition of his accomplishments. In 2019, he received the Clean Energy Award of the Latin American and Caribbean Council on Renewable Energy (LAC-CORE) and the Climate Breakthrough Award (an initiative of the Packard Foundation with the support of the Oak, Good Energies, and IKEA Foundations) for developing GREENMAP (Global Renewable Energy Mass Adoption Program). His objective for GREENMAP is to create a platform that fosters favorable market conditions and financial safeguards for renewable energy. The platform will enable the large-scale adoption of renewable energy in countries that have traditionally struggled to access international capital markets.

== Personal life ==
Kind lives in Spain with his wife and two children.
