= FRM =

FRM may refer to:

- Fatal risk management
- Financial Risk Manager, a risk management certification
- Fixed-rate mortgage
- Category of frames (Frm), in mathematics
- Fairmont Municipal Airport (Minnesota) (IATA and FAA LID codes), in the United States
- Fareham railway station, in England
- Fathers' rights movement, focused on custody and family law issues
- Frankfurt Rhine-Main, Germany
- Fondation pour la recherche médicale, a French foundation in the fields of medicine and pathophysiology
- FRM II (German: Forschungsreaktor München), a research reactor in Munich, Germany
- Front Row Motorsports, an American professional stock car racing team
- Middle French (ISO 639-2 and ISO 639-3 language codes: frm)
- National Technological University – Mendoza Regional Faculty (Spanish: Facultad Regional Mendoza), in Argentina
