= National Higher Institute of the Technician Professorate =

The National Higher Institute of the Technician Professorate (Castilian: Instituto Nacional Superior del Profesorado Técnico (INSPT-UTN)) is an accredited higher education institution of the Argentina Republic, dependent of the National Technological University.

== Careers ==
The institute, with main venue in the Triunvirato 3174 avenue, City of Buenos Aires, has the objectives of «form higher technicians, teachers and instructors in the diverse technological specialties that exist nowadays in the country», «assure the general, scientific and technical-teaching formation of the higher degree, according with the objectives of the level of each career» and organize the orientation, specialization, improvement, and constant update of their graduates.:

- Professorate in Industrial Disciplines
- Professorate in Superior Teaching
- Technologic Designing
- Electronic
- Automatization and Robotics
- Mathematics and Applied mathematics
- Chemistry and Applied Chemistry

== History ==
In 1956 the Argentinian government projected the creation of a "National Council of Technical Teaching", initiative that finally was realized on November 15, 1959, with the creation of the "National Technical Education Council" (CONET), «autarchic organism dependent of the minister of Education with the duties of direction, supervision and organization of the technical education and professional formation».

Fewer days after, on November 26, 1959, the "National Institute of the Technical Professorate" was created (Decree N° 15.958) for the teaching formation of the professionals required by the CONET schools. The Institute begun to operate in 1964 under the direction of the Leonardo Cozza dean, who stayed in that position until 1972. The Institute had a fast initial development and in 1975 it had 1570 student

Since its creation to 1990, the Institute «devoted exclusively to prepare the faculty with the technical schools requirements through formation careers, qualification courses and technical improvement and assistance», mainly given in the country but eventually taking the direction and supervision of the Multinational Project of Technical Education and Professional Formation of the Organization of American States (1972).

Beginning 1991, the possibility of Institute to broad its educational programs facing «the qualification needs that the country presents, according the challenges of the new technologies and flexibility that must confront the modern companies» was realized in 1994 with the creation of the "Higher Technician" degree, a three years undergraduate career, and the "Professorate in industrial disciplines", which integrates the "técnicatura" (scientific-technical degree) and the professorship formation degree.

On September 27, 1995, the institute was transferred to the National Technological University governing through an agreement between the Minister engineer Jorge Alberto Rodríguez in representation of the national executive power, and the Dean Héctor Carlos Brotto in representation of the university, arguing that the decision with «the needs to bind academically and administratively two institutions traditional separated and... with different histories, but both linked to the tech» maintaining the plans and objectives of the Institution with the additional objective of «functioning as center of permanent education for the teachers of the NTU».
