= National Technological University – Paraná Regional Faculty =

Coordinates: 31°45′1.09″S 60°30′15.54″W

The National Technological University – Paraná Regional Faculty or FRP (CastilianUniversidad Tecnológica Nacional(UTN-FRP)) is one of the universities of the National Technological University (UTN). It is located in Paraná, Argentina, and it offers academic degrees on the following subjects: The faculty began its academic activities in 1964 at the "José María Torres" Normal School.

- Electronic Engineering
- Civil Engineering
- Electromechanical Engineering

== See also ==
- UTN
