= Lencina =

Lencina is a surname. Notable people with the surname include:

- Jorge Lencina (born 1976), Argentine judoka
- Julio Lencina (1939–2022), Argentine cinematographer
- Marcos Lencina (born 1973), Argentine footballer
- Santiago Lencina (born 2005), Argentine footballer

== See also ==
- Daniel Lencina-Ribes (born 1977), Lithuanian tennis player
- Lencinas
