= Carlos Washington Lencinas =

Argentine politician (1888–1929)

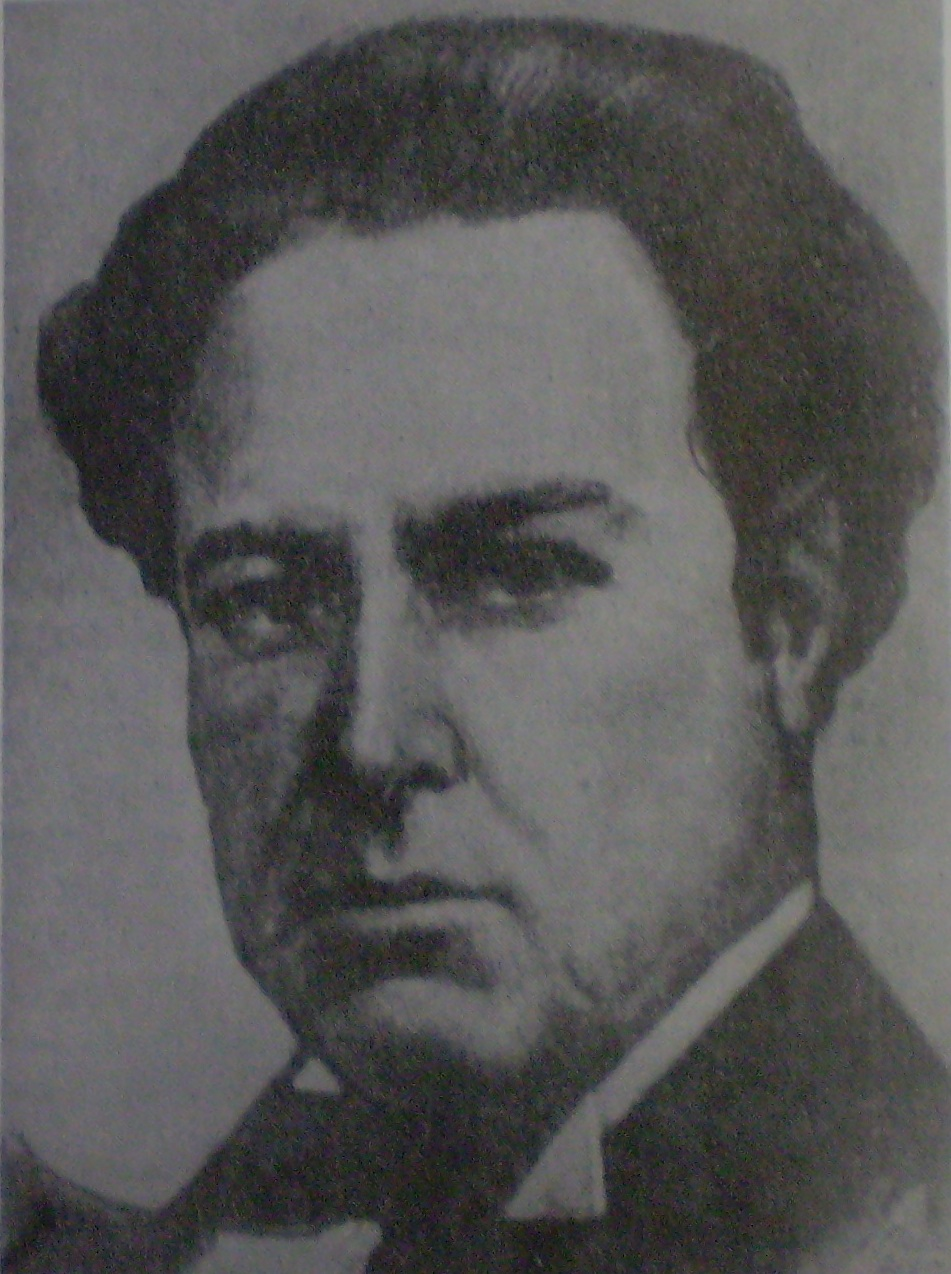

Governor of Mendoza
- In office 1922–1924
- Preceded by: Eudoro Vasos Gómez
- Succeeded by: Enrique Mosca

Personal details
- Born: November 13, 1888
- Died: November 10, 1929 (aged 40)

Carlos Washington Lencinas (November 13, 1888 – November 10, 1929) was an Argentine politician and governor of Mendoza, Argentina.

== Life and times ==
Carlos Washington Lencinas was born in Rivadavia Department, Mendoza, in 1888, to Fidela Peacock and José Néstor Lencinas. The elder Lencinas was a Mendoza Province lawmaker known for his tempestuous political rights advocacy. Carlos Lencinas enrolled at the National University of Córdoba, and upon earning a Law Degree, returned to Mendoza and joined his father as a local leader of the Radical Civic Union (UCR). He was elected to the Lower House of Congress alongside his father in 1916.

His father's progressive social and economic policies endeared him to the then-agrarian province's sizable population of tenant farmers and peons, many of which were victims of debt bondage. They also made enemies of the province's landowning elite, however, as well as of the reformist President Hipólito Yrigoyen, who sought the latter group's support, and had Lencinas removed as governor in late 1919. His father's death in 1920 made Congressman Lencinas a staunch opponent of President Yrigoyen, though without leaving the UCR. He, instead, became the leader of the "Situationist" UCR, one of a number of dissident UCR factions that arose on the heels of President Yrigoyen's numerous decrees removing governors and other lawmakers.

Lencinas was elected Governor of Mendoza in 1922, upon which his ticket became known as the "Lencinist" UCR. He focused public works spending on social infrastructure, notably the José Néstor Lencinas Hospital (inaugurated as a tuberculosis hospital). Restoring much of the suspended labor and social legislation signed by his father in 1919, Governor Lencinas fell out of step with the increasingly conservative UCR leadership, and was removed in 1924 by order of President Marcelo Torcuato de Alvear.

Maintaining a considerable following, he was elected to the Argentine Senate in 1928. As had occurred on numerous occasions in prior years, the Senate chose to exercise its prerogative allowing the body to refuse to seat any Senator-elect deemed "unfit to serve." Lencinas defended himself during lengthy hearings; but was ultimately refused his seat by a combination of UCR and Conservative votes.

He returned on November 10, 1929, to Mendoza with plans to rally support for his admittance into the Senate. Reportedly warned of a possible attempt on his life, Lencinas wrote to President Yrigoyen a letter in which he both requested protection, and made him responsible for anything untoward that might befall him; as he emerged onto a downtown Mendoza balcony to address supporters, Carlos Washington Lencinas was shot in the heart by an unknown assailant.

The nature of Lencinas' assassination, and that it remained an unsolved mystery, prompted a number of hypotheses in the subsequent decades, including speculation that he may have been killed over a love triangle, or that his assassination may have orchestrated by President Yrigoyen's Mendoza supporters. A historical inquiry concluded in 2004 found that, in fact, credible evidence existed to support the hypothesis of a political conspiracy; whether such a plot was organized by Yrigoyen's supporters, by reactionary landowners, or by others, remained indeterminable.
