= José Videla Castillo =

Argentine military officer

Governor of San Juan Province, Argentina
- In office 30 April 1830 – 5 April 1831
- Preceded by: Tomás Godoy Cruz
- Succeeded by: Manuel Lemos

Personal details
- Born: 1792 Mendoza, Viceroyalty of the Rio de la Plata
- Died: June 1832 (aged 39–40) Sucre, Bolivia
- Party: Unitarian Party

José Videla Castillo (1792 – June 1832) was an Argentine military officer who fought in his country's war of independence and later in the Argentine Civil Wars on the Unitarian side.

== Biography ==
José Videla del Castillo was born in Mendoza, Argentina in 1792. He joined the Argentine army in 1815. He joined the Army of the Andes and participated in the battles of Battle of Chacabuco, Cancha Rayada and Maipú. He was a captain in the Peruvian campaign to Peru, fought in the Battle of Cerro de Pasco and was decorated for the defense of the city of Lima. He spent a few months as a prisoner of the Royalist party, after being captured during the Callao uprising on 4 February 1824, then fought in the Battle of Ayacucho.

Castillo participated in the war against Brazil in the regiment of José María Paz, fighting in the Battle of Ituzaingó. He later joined the invasion by Paz of Córdoba Province in 1829, and fought at San Roque, La Tablada and Oncativo.

After this last battle, Paz sent Castillo to his home province of Mendoza to overthrow the government of Juan Rege Corvalán, a Federalist ally of Facundo Quiroga. In early April 1830 he entered Mendoza, where he held a "town meeting" consisting exclusively of Unitarians that elected Tomás Godoy Cruz as acting governor. After elections to form a new legislature, he had himself elected governor on 30 April 1830. He remained in charge of the military, but he let Tomás Godoy Cruz take all political and administrative decisions as his minister. He spent most of the time in the barracks outside the city.

In mid-January 1831 Castillo received the news that General Quiroga was coming to attack him from San Luis Province. Quiroga was supposed to have been permanently defeated at Oncativo. He left hurriedly to deal with the threat, but his troops were destroyed by Quiroga in the Battle of Rodeo de Chacón on 28 March 1831. Castillo managed to flee to join forces with Paz, who was facing Federalist attack by Estanislao López.

After Paz was captured, the army led by Gregorio Aráoz de Lamadrid retreated to Tucumán Province. They faced Quiroga again in the Battle of La Ciudadela, where he was the head of the Unitarian infantry. After the defeat, he went into exile in Bolivia. He dedicated himself to the production of coffee, sugar and pepper in Santa Cruz de la Sierra, but a fire destroyed his property, causing him severe depression. He died in Sucre in June 1832.
