= Roberto Iglesias =

Argentine politician

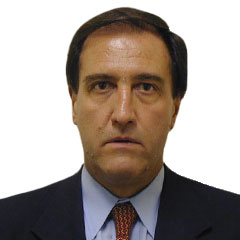

President of the National Committee of the Radical Civic Union
- In office December 2005 – November 2006
- Preceded by: Ángel Rozas
- Succeeded by: Gerardo Morales

National Deputy
- In office 10 December 2003 – 10 December 2007
- Constituency: Mendoza

Governor of Mendoza
- In office 10 December 1999 – 10 December 2003
- Preceded by: Arturo Lafalla
- Succeeded by: Julio Cobos

Personal details
- Born: 25 February 1951 (age 75) Mendoza, Argentina
- Party: Radical Civic Union

Roberto Raúl Iglesias (born 25 February 1951) is an Argentine Radical Civic Union (UCR) politician, a former leader of the party and formerly a deputy, and governor of Mendoza Province.

Iglesias was born in Mendoza, Argentina, and enrolled at the local campus of the National Technological University, earning a degree in construction engineering. He was elected city councilman in 1991, and Mayor of Mendoza, in 1995. Joining an alliance between the UCR and FrePaSo, he was elected Governor of Mendoza Province in 1999. He stepped down in 2003, being elected to the Argentine Chamber of Deputies.

In December 2005, Iglesias succeeded Ángel Rozas as president of the national committee of the Radical Civic Union, effectively leader of the party. In gaining the position, he took a hard-line approach against Peronist President Néstor Kirchner, largely opposing efforts to re-align the Radicals alongside the left-wing Kirchner.

Iglesias had supported fellow UCR member, Julio Cobos, to succeed him as governor in 2003, but they subsequently fell out in a high-profile manner. Cobos became a leading supporter of President Kirchner in Radical ranks, taking a more left-wing position, and Iglesias leading the opposition to Kirchner ahead of the 2007 elections. He threatened to resign if the UCR did not deal with deputies and governors who align themselves with Kirchner.

Iglesias led negotiations to find a suitable candidate for the UCR to back in the 2007 Presidential elections. Roberto Lavagna, a former minister under Kirchner who subsequently opposed his policies, appeared to be the favoured candidate for the majority of the Party. However, Iglesias eventually resigned the presidency of the party in November 2006 due to differences with Lavagna, having reached the conclusion that an alliance with him would be a mistake, and joined the camp which maintained that the party should look for its own candidate (the so-called Radicales R).

On 1 December 2006 the UCR National Committee appointed Jujuy Province Senator Gerardo Morales as its new president. Morales stated that he wanted to follow the mandate of the Rosario convention (that is, looking for a possible alliance with Roberto Lavagna) and went on to become Lavagna's running mate in the presidential election of October 2007, coming third. Cobos meanwhile was elected vice president as the running mate of Cristina Fernández de Kirchner. Iglesias stood to be governor of Mendoza once again but came fourth with less than 10% of the vote. He left the Chamber of Deputies at the same election.

Iglesias has accepted the request of Morales to plan together the future of the UCR, including to consider an alliance with the centre-left and a way to accommodate those Radicals who have hitherto backed Kirchnerism in the Plural Consensus.

Political offices
Preceded by Arturo Lafalla	Governor of Mendoza; 1999 – 2003	Succeeded by Julio Cobos
