= National Technological University – Córdoba Regional Faculty =

The National University of Technology – Córdoba Regional Faculty (Castilian: Universidad Tecnológica Nacional - Facultad Regional at Córdoba, Argentina, (UTN-FRC)).

== Structure ==
The site is to the north of Córdoba Air Base, in the west of the city.

== Careers ==
=== Short Careers ===
- Superior Technic on Industrial Maintenance.
- Superior Technic on Food.
- Superior Technic on Mechatronic.
- Superior Technic on Programming.

=== Degrees ===
- Engineering:
  - Civil Engineering.
  - Electronics Engineering.
  - Electrical Engineering.
  - Industrial Engineering.
  - Mechanic Engineering.
  - Metallurgical Engineering
  - Chemical Engineering.
  - Information Systems Engineering.

=== Postgraduate Degrees ===
- PhD degree:
  - Engineering doctor.
    - Mention in Chemical.
    - Mention in Electronic.
    - Mention in Materials.
- Master's degree:
  - Master of Quality Engineering.
  - Master of Business Administration.
  - Master of Environmental Engineering.
  - Master of University Teaching.
  - Master of Automatic Control Engineering.
  - Master of Information Systems Engineering.
- Specializations:
  - Specialization in Quality Engineering.
  - Specialization in Business Administration.
  - Specialization in Environmental Engineering.
  - Specialization in University Teaching.
  - Specialization in Automatic Control Engineering.
  - Specialization in Information Systems Engineering.
  - Specialization in Work Hygiene and Safety.
- Other:
  - Degree in Educational Technology.

=== Postgraduate Courses ===
- Gas Chromatography.
- Physics of Materials.
- Projects Management

== History ==
This NTU College is one of the 24 regional faculties of the Universidad Tecnológica Nacional of Argentina.

== Sources ==
- (in Spanish) Official website
