= Tomás Godoy Cruz =

Argentine statesman and businessman

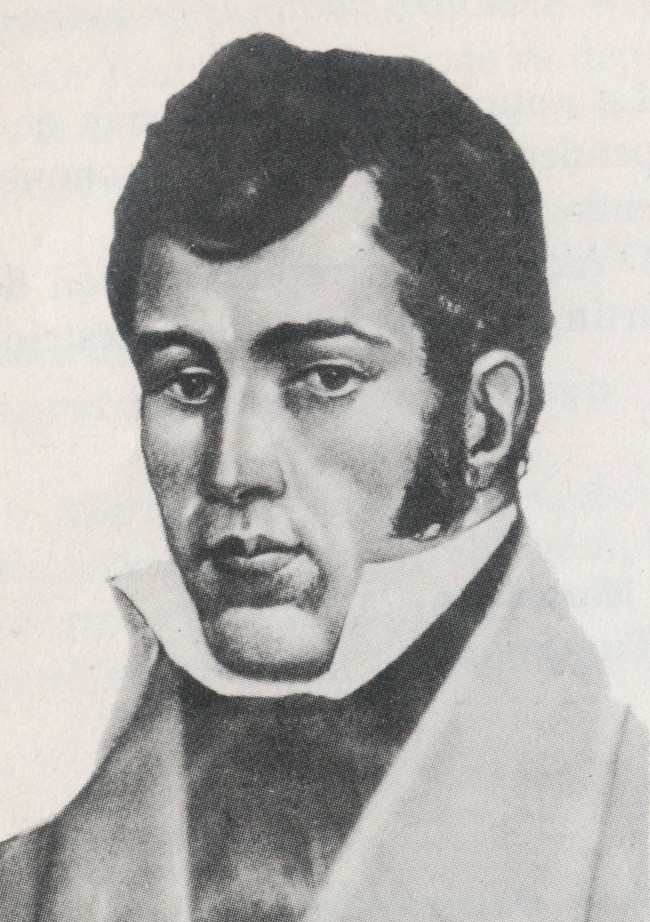
Tomás Godoy Cruz

Tomás Godoy Cruz (May 6, 1791 – May 15, 1852) was an Argentine statesman and businessman. He was a representative to the Congress of Tucumán which on July 9, 1816 declared the Independence of Argentina.

Godoy Cruz was born in Mendoza, Viceroyalty of the Río de la Plata. He studied in Mendoza, then in Santiago, Chile at the Royal University of San Felipe, graduating in philosophy, canonical and civil law. He lived in Santiago until 1814, and served in the Santiago Cabildo (council) during the last year of his stay. He then returned to Mendoza, setting up a gunpowder factory. He agitated to make General José de San Martín governor of Cuyo, and helped finance the Army of the Andes.

In 1815, at just 24 years old, Godoy Cruz was elected by Mendoza to the Tucumán Congress and served in 1816 for the declaration. He was president on two occasions and vice-president on one. He subsequently served as governor of Mendoza Province 1820–22. In 1831 he was exiled to Chile where he was a teacher and pioneered silkworm cultivation. He was also a successful merchant of woven goods.

The city of Godoy Cruz and its surrounding department in Mendoza, and streets across the country were named in his honour.

Preceded by Pedro José Campos	Governor of Mendoza; 1820 – 1822	Succeeded by Pedro Molina y Sotomayor
Preceded by Judges of First Instance	Governor of Mendoza (acting); 1830	Succeeded by José Videla Castillo
