= Juan de Dios Videla =

Argentine politician

35th Governor of Mendoza Province
- In office December 16, 1861 – January 2, 1862
- Preceded by: Laureano Nazar
- Succeeded by: Hilario Correas

Governor of San Juan Province
- In office January 5, 1867 – April 6, 1867
- Preceded by: Camilo Rojo
- Succeeded by: Camilo Rojo

Personal details
- Born: March 7, 1815 Mendoza, Viceroyalty of Rio de la Plata
- Died: September 3, 1880 (aged 65) Mendoza, Argentina
- Party: Federalist Party

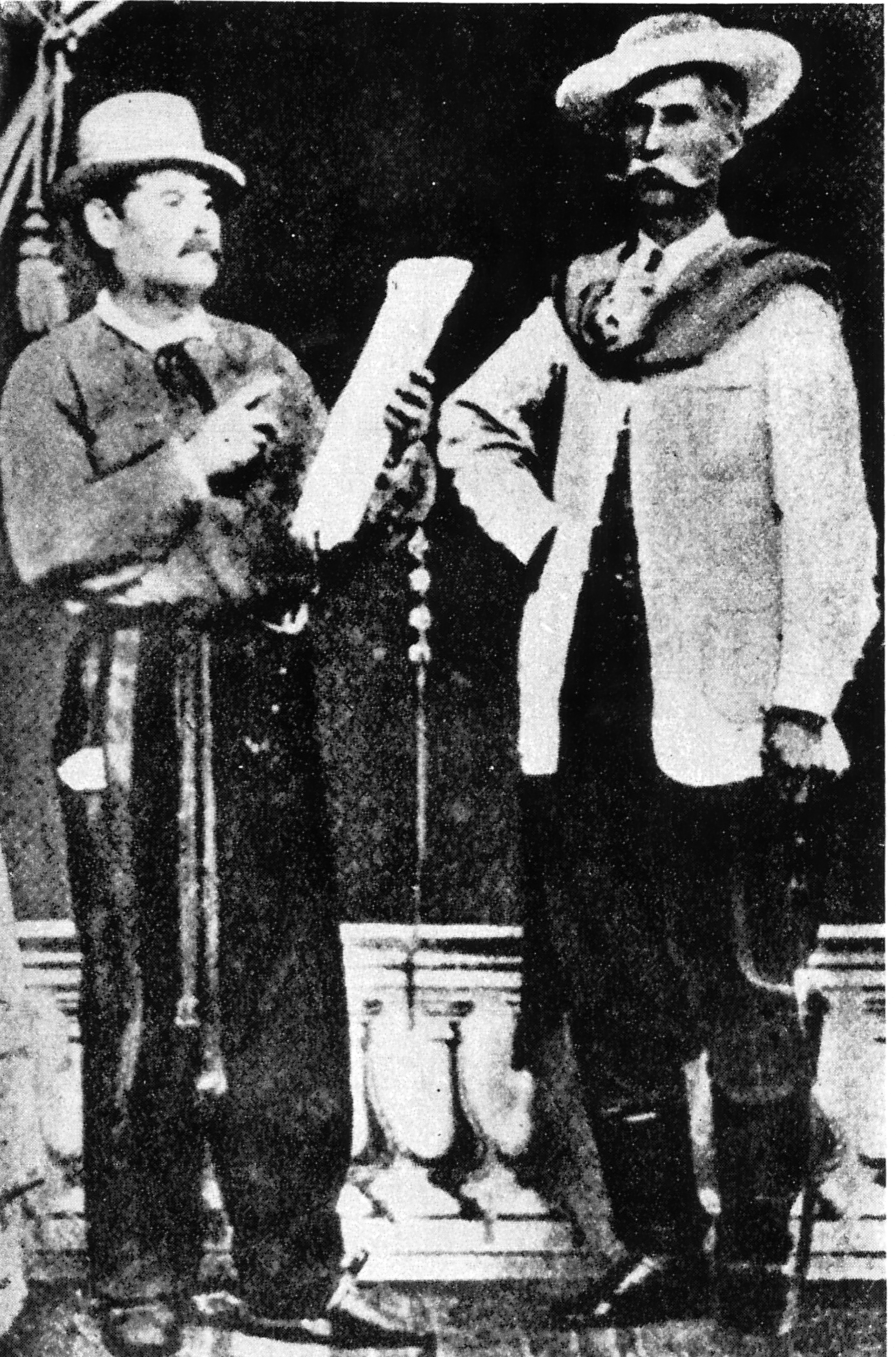

Juan de Dios Videla Moyano (1815 - 1880) was an Argentine soldier who held the position as Governor of Mendoza from December 16, 1861 to January 2, 1862 . He was also Governor of San Juan for a few months in 1867.
