= National Technological University – La Plata Regional Faculty =

Coordinates: 34°54′17.17″S 57°55′33.11″W

The National Technological University – La Plata Regional Faculty (Castilian: Universidad Tecnológica Nacional - Facultad Regional La Plata (UTN-FRLP)) (The UTN of La Plata, Argentina) is a university in Argentina. The university is housed in an 11,000 square metres (120,000 sq ft) building. Over 2,000 students have graduated from the University since its creation. The school specializes in technology subjects, offering seven undergraduate and five postgraduate concentrations.

== History ==
UTN is one of the 24 regional faculties of the National Technological University of Argentina, and was created on 24 September 1954. In the beginning it occupied the Mary O'Graham buildings, and later the building of the Colegio Nacional.

On 1 October 1961, the national government signed the Nº 9035 decree, which designated an official location for the University. This decree stated that the University was to be located on the corner of 60th avenue and 124th street, in the city of La Plata. But it was not until 1966 that the building was inaugurated with help from the government of the Buenos Aires Province.

== Courses ==
=== Undergraduate ===
- Engineering:
  - Civil engineering
  - Electrical engineering
  - Industrial engineering
  - Mechanical engineering
  - Naval engineering
  - Chemical engineering
  - Information systems engineering

=== Postgraduate ===
- Magister degrees:
  - Environmental engineering
  - Food technology
- Specializations:
  - Work hygiene and safety
  - Laboural engineering
  - Food technology
