= Ernesto Ueltschi =

Argentine politician, lawyer and teacher

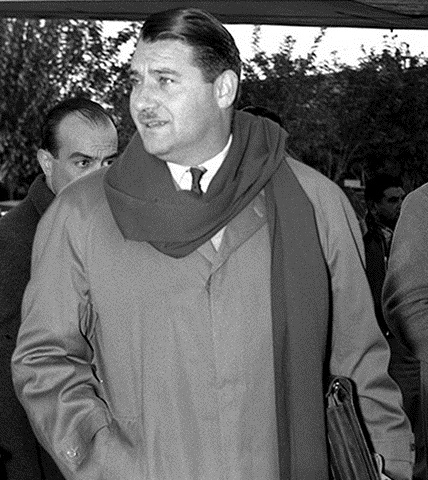
- Ueltschi in 1958

Governor of Mendoza
- In office May 1, 1958 – October 12, 1961
- Preceded by: Isidoro Busquets (de facto)
- Succeeded by: Francisco Gabrielli

Personal details
- Born: April 1, 1922 San Rafael, Mendoza, Argentina
- Died: July 6, 2014 (aged 92) Buenos Aires, Argentina
- Party: Radical Civic Union (UCR); Intransigent Radical Civic Union; Integration and Development Movement
- Spouse: Zulema Inés Lasa
- Children: Three

Ernesto Arturo Ueltschi (April 1, 1922 – July 6, 2014) was an Argentine politician, lawyer, and teacher. Ueltschi served as the Governor of Mendoza from May 1, 1958, until October 12, 1961. His political career spanned from 1940 until 1995, when he tendered his resignation from the Integration and Development Movement (MID).

Ueltschi was born in San Rafael, Mendoza, on April 1, 1922, to Oscar Rodolfo and Marta Hübbe. He and his family were of Swiss descent. He earned his law degree from the National University of La Plata in 1944. Ueltschi married Zulema Inés Lasa with whom he had three children - two lawyers and one engineer.

Ueltschi won the Mendoza state election on February 23, 1958, as a candidate for the Intransigent Radical Civic Union (UCRI), the political party of incoming President Arturo Frondizi. He was sworn into office as Governor of Mendoza on May 1, 1958, when he was 36 years old, and served until 1961. His vice governor was Pedro Luca Luja. His predecessor, Francisco Gabrielli, was elected through the state's first direct gubernatorial election in 1961.

Ernesto Ueltschi died in Buenos Aires, where he resided, on July 6, 2014, at the age of 92.
