= National Technological University – General Pacheco Regional Faculty =

The National Technological University – General Pacheco Regional Faculty (Castilian: Universidad Tecnológica Nacional - Facultad Regional General Pacheco (UTN-FRGP).

== Careers ==
=== Degrees ===
- Engineering:
  - Civil Engineering.
  - Electrical Engineering.
  - Mechanical Engineering.
  - Automotive Engineering.
  - Licentiate in Industrial Organisation.
  - Licentiate in Mathematics Education.

=== Postgraduate Degrees ===
- Magisters:
- Specializations:

== History ==
This NTU College is one of the 24 regional faculties of the Universidad Tecnológica Nacional of Argentina.

== Sources ==
- (in Spanish) Official website
