= Mario Barletta =

Argentine hydraulic engineer and politician

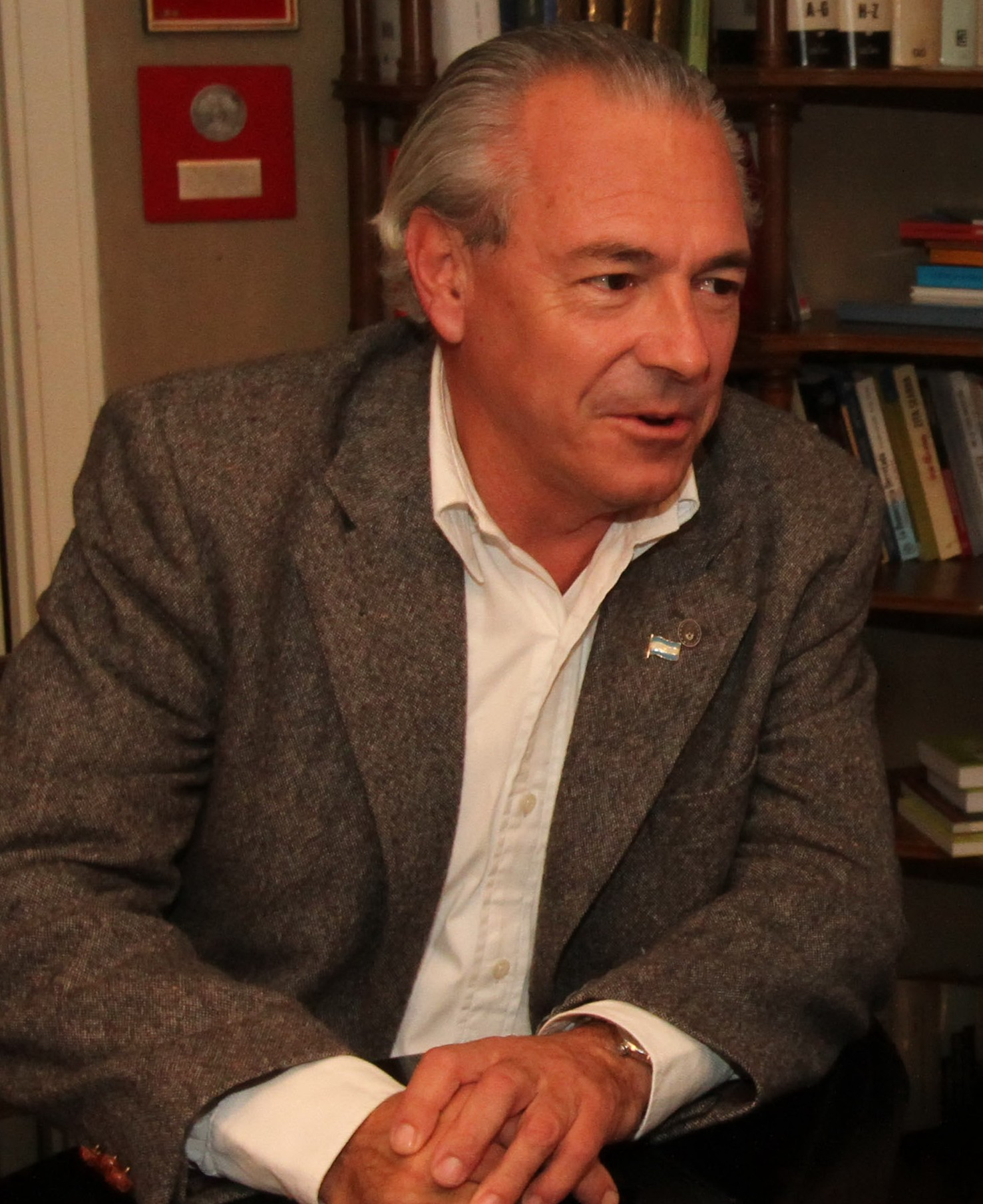

National Deputy
- Incumbent
- Assumed office 10 December 2021
- Constituency: Santa Fe
- In office 10 December 2013 – 10 December 2017
- Constituency: Santa Fe

Ambassador of Argentina to Uruguay
- In office 24 January 2018 – 10 December 2019
- Preceded by: Guillermo Montenegro
- Succeeded by: Alberto Iribarne

President of the National Committee of the Radical Civic Union
- In office 16 December 2011 – 4 December 2015
- Preceded by: Ernesto Sanz
- Succeeded by: José Manuel Corral

Mayor of Santa Fe, Argentina
- In office 10 December 2007 – 10 December 2011
- Preceded by: Ezequiel Balbarrey
- Succeeded by: José Corral

Personal details
- Born: December 30, 1953 (age 72) Santa Fe, Argentina
- Party: Radical Civic Union
- Education: National University of the Littoral; Latin American Social Sciences Institute
- Profession: Hydraulic engineer

Mario Domingo Barletta (born 30 December 1953) is an Argentine hydraulic engineer and politician. He served as mayor of Santa Fe, Argentina from 2007 to 2011, and was elected President of the Radical Civic Union (UCR) in 2011. Since 2021, he has been a National Deputy.

== Biography ==
=== Academic career ===
Barletta was born in Santa Fe. He enrolled at the National University of the Littoral (UNL) and graduated with a degree in Hydraulic Engineering in 1978. He later took postgraduate courses in the United States (at the universities of Illinois and Columbia). He has a Master of Social Sciences from FLACSO (the Latin American Social Sciences Institute).

Barletta was a professor at the Faculty of Engineering and Hydrical Sciences, and guest professor in other universities. He worked in his field at the Centro Regional Litoral and in the water departments of the provincial governments of Entre Ríos, Santa Fe, Chaco, Misiones and Río Negro.

He directed the Department of General and Applied Hydrology of the UNL, and was the first dean of his faculty. He served as Secretary of Scientific Investigation and Secretary General of UNL. On 22 February 2000 the University Assembly elected him rector, in order to complete the term of Hugo Storero (who had resigned to become a National Deputy). He presided the National Inter-University Council until October 2000, and was part of the Directorship of CONICET (the National Scientific and Technical Research Council), in representation of public and private universities.

He was reelected as rector of the UNL in November 2005, and served from March 2006 until December 2007, when he left to become mayor of Santa Fe.

=== Career in politics ===
Barletta ran for the office of Mayor of Santa Fe City on the election of 2 September 2007, representing the Progressive, Civic and Social Front (the same coalition which took the Socialist Hermes Binner to the governor's seat). He came first in the race (32.64% of the vote), with a slight difference of about 3,000 votes, ahead of the Justicialist/Front for Victory candidate Martín Balbarrey (the former mayor, running for reelection), and the independent Peronist candidate Oscar Martínez.

Among his first government measures, Barletta announced the start of a permanent internal audit of the municipality's finances, and declared a "hydrical emergency", to deal swiftly with the vulnerable state of the city facing large amounts of rainfall. Santa Fe City, located in low terrain besides two large rivers, suffered a large flood in 2003, and another serious flood during the autumn 2007 season.

Days after completing his term as Mayor of Santa Fe, Barletta was elected President of the National Committee of the Radical Civic Union (UCR) in December 2011 as a consensus candidate.
