= José Manuel Corral (politician) =

Argentinian politician

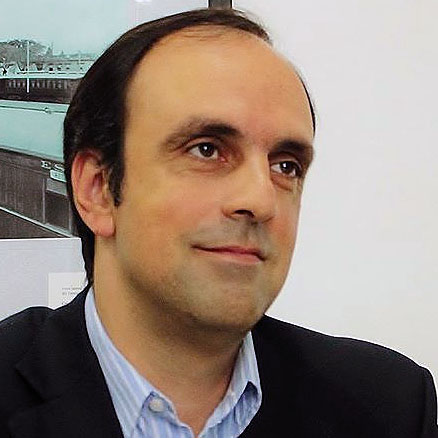
- Born: 28 October 1968 (age 57); Santa Fe, Santa Fe, Argentina
- Known for: Mayor of the Santa Fe city
- Political party: Radical Civic Union

José Manuel Corral (born October 28, 1968, in Santa Fe, Santa Fe, Argentina) is a lawyer, a political activist of the Radical Civic Union and a member of Cambiemos. He was Mayor of Santa Fe for eight years.

== Early life and education ==
He was born in Santa Fe de la Vera Cruz on October 28, 1968, to his parents Súper Manuel Corral and Celia García. He attended primary school at the School No. 6 Mariano Moreno and high school at the Industrial High School (EIS for its initials in Spanish), ending his studies at the High School No. 331 Admiral Guillermo Brown, earning a high school degree with a physical-mathematical orientation.

== Political career ==
During the first years of Argentina's return to democracy (during the eighties), he began his political activism at his high school, where he promoted – together with other students – the creation of students’ unions throughout the city. He was elected president of the Students’ Union of the Almirante Brown school. He studied law at the Universidad Nacional del Litoral Law School, where he was elected President of the Students’ Union in 1992 with 63% of the votes.

In 1994 he chaired the Universidad Nacional del Litoral Federation (FUL for its acronym in Spanish), which a second-degree body which brings together all students’ unions of the Universidad Nacional del Litoral (UNL for its initials in Spanish). In that year, he named Ernesto Sábato – the prestigious Argentine writer – as the Honorary President of the FUL. In 1995 – at a national seminar, where more than 2,000 young activists participated – he was elected Secretary General of the National Bureau of the University Political Group Franja Morada. Corral held that position for two years.

In 1998 he joined the university activity in the area of Planning and Evaluation. In 1999 he was designated Secretary of the University Extension office.

In November 2003, he was elected for the position of Secretary General of the UNL.

He completed his studies for an M.A. degree in Public Administration, at the College of Economic Sciences (FCE for its initials in Spanish) of the Universidad Nacional del Litoral. In December 2007 he was appointed Government Secretary by the mayor of Santa Fe, Mario Barletta. In that position, he worked to incorporate transparency policies to the current administration. He incorporated the camera system surveillance and the voluntary disarmament program. He also established a compulsory entrance exam to join the public administration and training courses for all municipal employees, as well as negotiations with the National Government claiming for the Train Station Manuel Belgrano and the City Train, among other projects.

By the end of 2009, he was chosen in almost all districts of the city and became president of the Municipal Council. During his term, he worked to obtain the approval for important legislation such as the Urban Management Plan, the creation of the Industrial Area "Polygons", various initiatives for urban planning and traffic safety, the creation of the Entity of Regulation of the Urban Transport for Passengers, and the recovery of emblematic public areas. Emphasis was placed on the policy of transparency and closeness to the neighbors.

On July 24, 2011, the citizens of Santa Fe elected him Mayor with 45.05% of the votes, winning 11 of the 18 districts of the city. He obtained more than 60% of the votes in downtown neighborhoods and he won in traditionally peronistas neighborhoods.

During his term of office, some lines proposed in his Development Plan for Santa Fe 2020, received international recognition. This is the case of the Mayor award of the World Champion Campaign 2010–2015 "Making Cities Resilient", awarded by the Office of the United Nations Disaster Risk Reduction. Santa Fe was the first city in Argentina to join this campaign. This same institution chose Santa Fe as an example of Model City.

Furthermore, Santa Fe is included in the 100 Resilient Cities initiative of The Rockefeller Foundation. Also, Santa Fe City – during Corral's government – obtained the Second Mention Award in Municipal Policies, awarded by the CIPPEC (Centro de Implementación de Políticas Públicas para la Equidad y el Crecimiento) in the context of Innovation in Public Management for quality and growth. Santa Fe city won this recognition for its innovative Municipal System for Early Childhood Education.
