= National Technological University – Haedo Regional Faculty =

Branch college in Haedo, Buenos Aires, Argentina

Coordinates: 34°38′26″S 58°36′07″W

UTN Facultad Regional Haedo
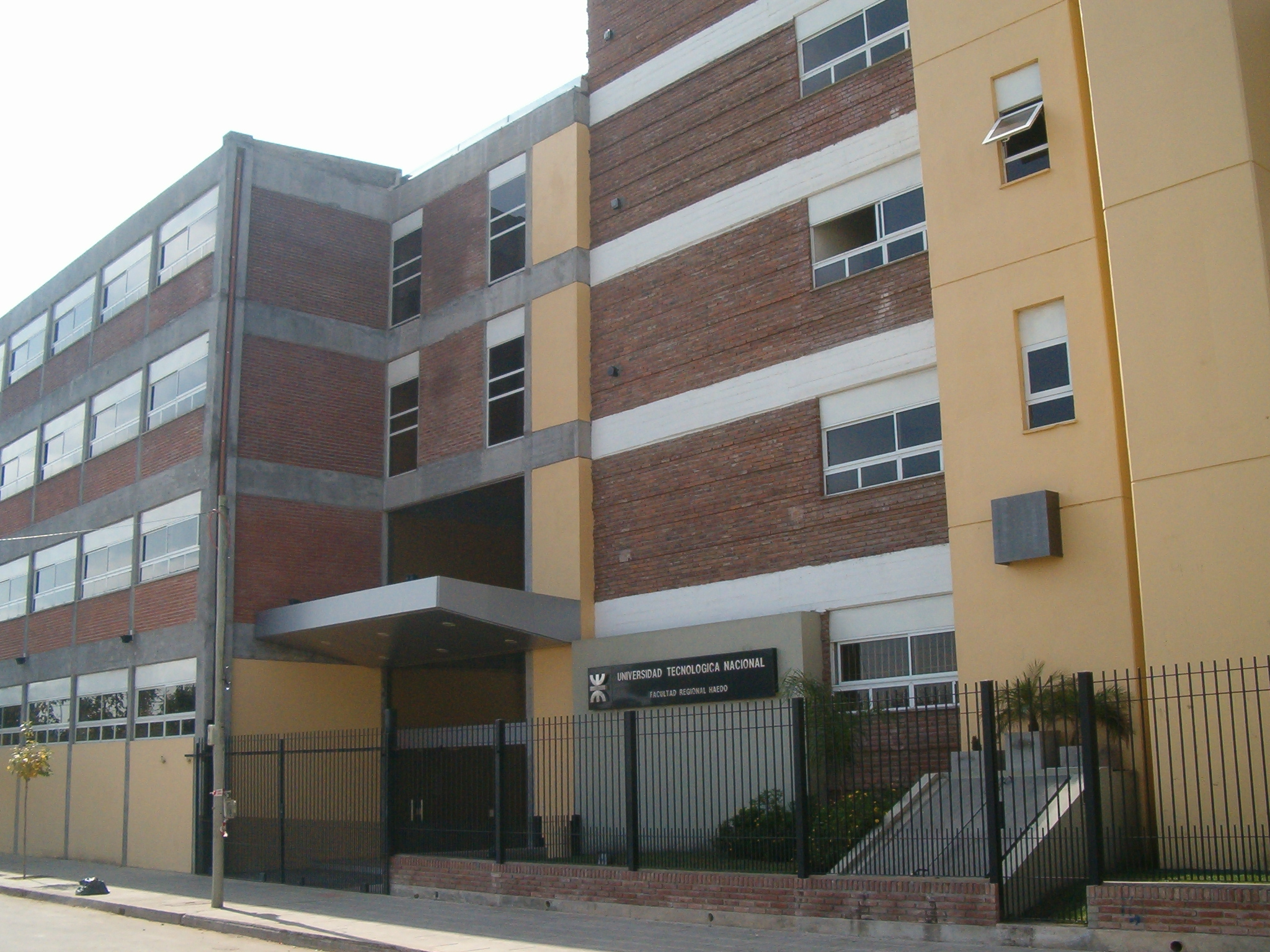
- UTN, Haedo campus
- Type: Public university (regional affiliate)
- Established: 13 September 1873; 152 years ago
- Dean: Ing. Carlos Salvador
- Location: Haedo, Buenos Aires Province, Argentina
- Campus: Urban
- Colours: Black and Green
- Website: frh.utn.edu.ar (Spanish)

The National Technological University – Haedo Regional Faculty (Castilian:Universidad Tecnológica Nacional - Facultad Regional Haedo (UTN-FRH)) is an affiliate of the National Technological University, the leading institution of its type in Argentina. Located in Haedo, a western suburb of Buenos Aires, it was established in 1967 and offers academic degrees in the following subjects:

- Aeronautical engineering
- Electronic engineering
- Industrial engineering
- Mechanical engineering
- Railway engineering
- Bioengineering

== See also ==
- UTN
