= José Néstor Lencinas =

Argentine politician (1859–1920)

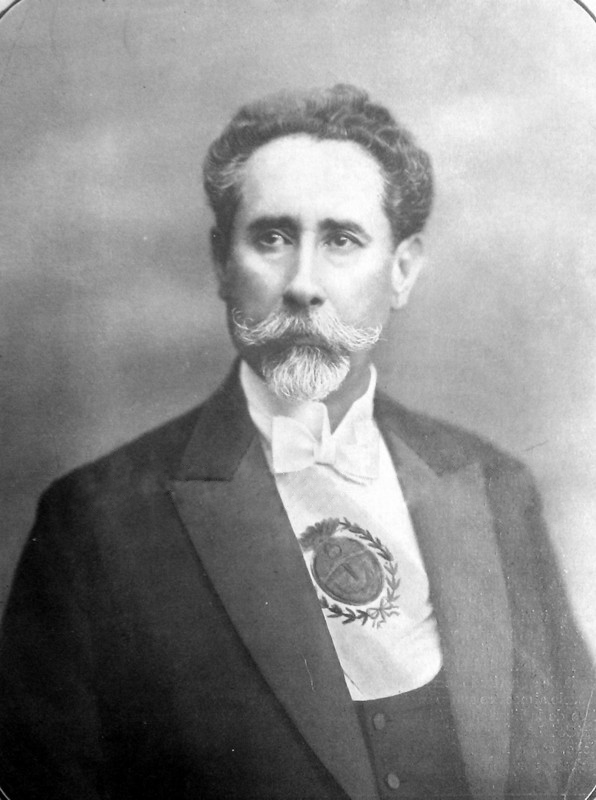
José Néstor Lencinas (1859–1920)

José Néstor Lencinas (February 26, 1859 – January 20, 1920) was an Argentine politician and former Governor of Mendoza Province.

== Life and times ==
Born in San Carlos, Mendoza, Lencinas enrolled at the University of Buenos Aires; while in law school, his adviser, Dr. Carlos Tejedor, recommended he transfer to the University of Córdoba. Lencinas became active politically at the latter school, and participated in an effort to force the Governor of Córdoba, Antonio del Viso, to resign (which the latter, a member of one of the province's leading families, did, in 1880). Lencinas earned his Law Degree with a thesis on Constitutional Law.

Lencinas returned to Mendoza Province, and was shortly afterwards elected to the Provincial Legislature. He stepped down in 1887 to travel extensively in Europe and the United States, at which time he became an adherent of Theosophy. During his travels, Lencinas reportedly took over the helm of an ocean liner whose captain had been incapacitated by panic. He returned in 1888, was reelected to the legislature, and in 1890, was named Economy Minister by interim Governor Oseas Guiñazú. He established a newspaper in the city of Mendoza, La Reforma, and was a founding member of what became the leading advocacy group for electoral reform and the secret ballot, the Radical Civic Union (UCR). Vigorously opposed by the senior Senator from Mendoza, Emilio Civit, these moves led the closure of La Reforma in 1892, and to the province's renewed "intervention" by federal authorities.

Electoral fraud led to a failed civil uprising on the part of the UCR in 1893, and again in 1905. Lencinas participated in both, and became notable for being the only insurrectionist to overthrow a provincial governor during the latter conflict (if only briefly). He avoided jail in the then-notorious Ushuaia prison, or execution, by fleeing to neighboring Chile after commandeering a Transandine Railway locomotive. Lencinas, as well as surviving fellow participants in the revolt, ultimately benefited from a 1906 pardon by President José Figueroa Alcorta.

The 1912 passage of the Sáenz Peña Law, which provided much of the electoral reform the UCR had agitated for, led to the election of their longtime leader, Hipólito Yrigoyen, in 1916. Lencinas was elected to the Lower House of Congress alongside his son, Carlos, and following President Yrigoyen's decree removing the Conservative governor of Mendoza in November 1917, Lencinas was elected to the post. Taking office on March 6, 1918, he pursued a progressive agenda for the standards of the day, enacting an ambitious program of labor and social legislation that included an 8-hour workday and a minimum wage (some of the nation's first reforms of their type). These policies put him at odds with not only the landed gentry; but also President Yrigoyen, who sought to maintain cordial relations with the then-agrarian country's powerful landowning elite. Lencinas, instead, believed the latter group was co-opting the UCR by joining its ranks, and advocated for Yrigoyen's break with what he termed "Fair-weather Radicals" (particularly the most prominent of these at the time, the President of the Senate, Leopoldo Melo). Following Lencinas' convalescence from a sudden pulmonary illness, Yrigoyen intervened once again, removing the governor on December 24.

The appointed Federal Receiver, Dr. Tomás de Veyga, resigned, however, and his successor, Dr. Perfecto Araya, reinstated Lencinas as governor. The ensuing struggle with Delfín Álvarez, Lencinas' former Vice-Governor and now nemesis, as well as with the Legislature and the courts, proved too much for Lencinas, who died in Mendoza on January 20, 1920. His son, Carlos Washington Lencinas, was elected governor in 1922.
