= Juan Rege Corvalán =

Argentine politician and military man

Juan Rege Corvalán (1787–1830) was an Argentine politician and military man. He was governor of the province of Mendoza and leader of the Federalist Party.
