= Oseas Guiñazú =

Argentine politician

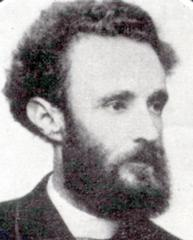
Oseas Guiñazú

Oseas Guiñazú Estrella was an Argentine politician of the late 19th century. He served as interim governor of Mendoza Province from 1890 until 1891, succeeding Domingo Bombal in the position.
