= Rodolfo Gabrielli =

Argentine politician

Rodolfo Gabrielli is an Argentine politician. He served as governor of the Mendoza Province from 1991 to 1995, and as Interior Minister during the presidencies of Adolfo Rodríguez Saá and Eduardo Duhalde. Since 2020 he has served as president of the Casa de Moneda, the Argentine national mint.
