= National Technological University – Mendoza Regional Faculty =

Coordinates: 32.896592°S 68.853087°W

The Facultad Regional Mendoza or FRM is one branch of the National Technological University (Castilian: Universidad Tecnológica Nacional - Facultad Regional Mendoza (UTN-FRM)). It is located in Mendoza the capital city of Mendoza in Argentina, and it offers academic degrees in the following fields:

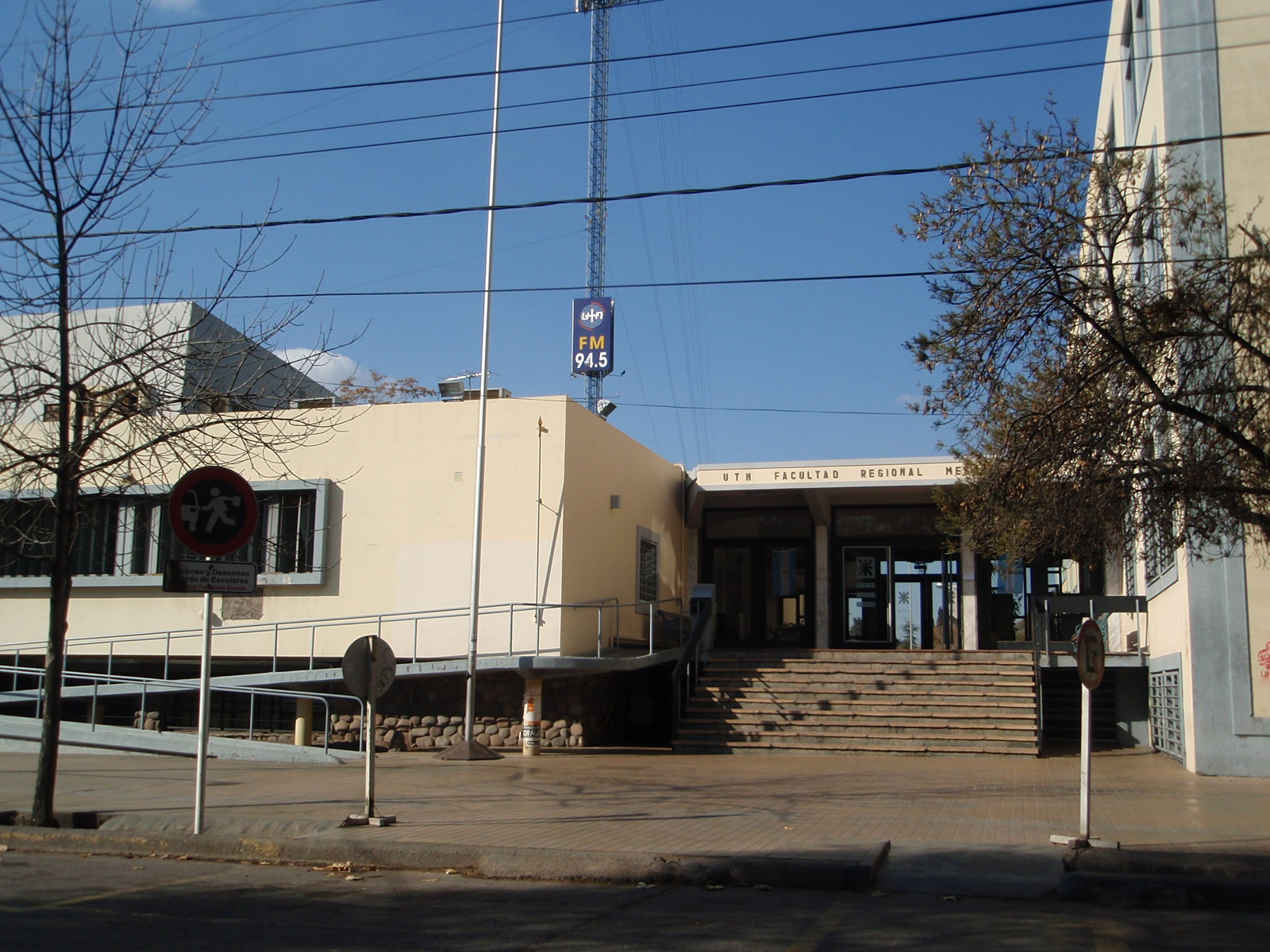
UTN - Facultad Regional Mendoza main entrance

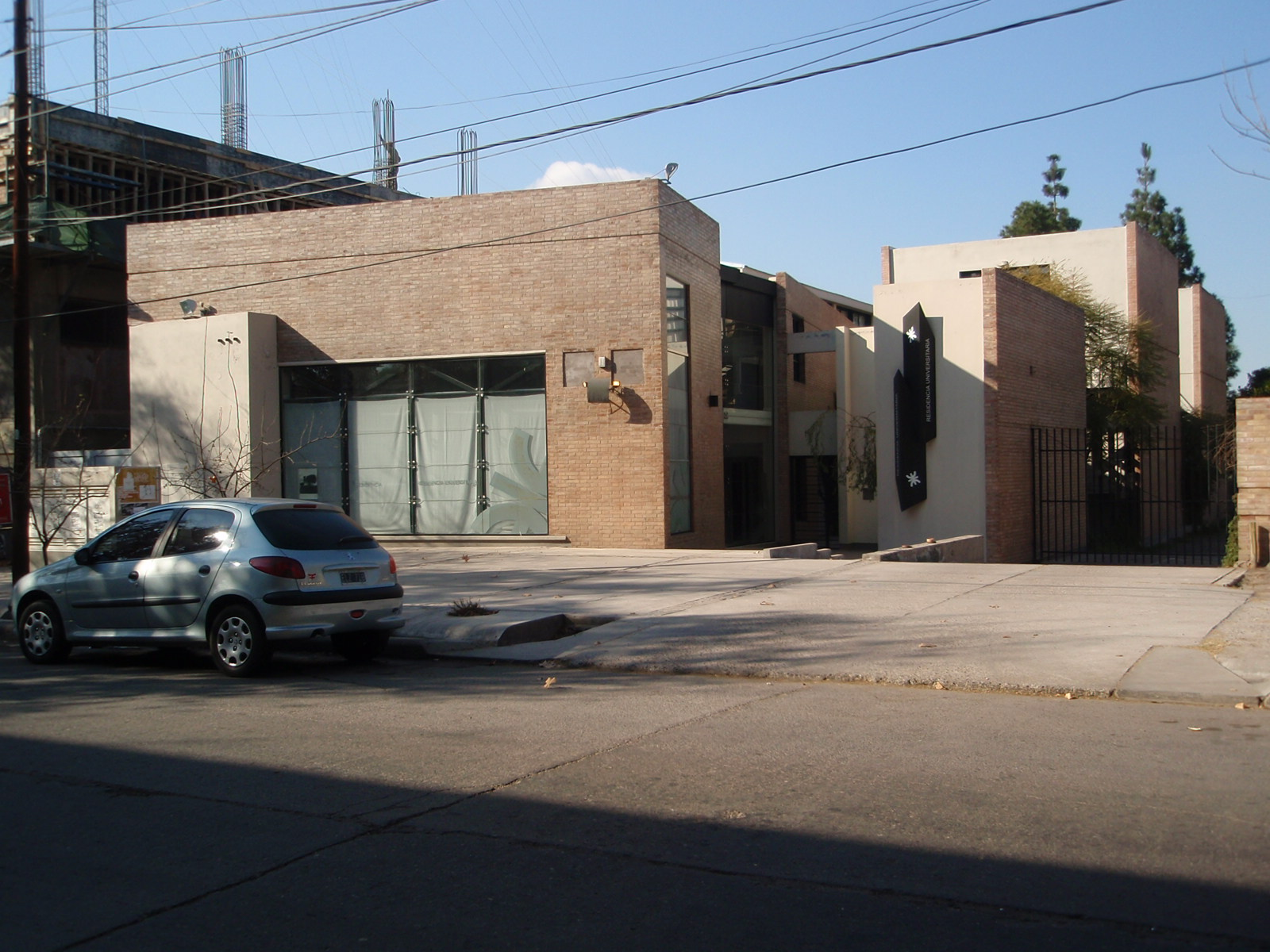
Residences

== Engineer's degrees ==
- Electronic Engineering
- Civil engineering
- Chemical engineering
- Systems engineering
- Electro-mechanical engineering

== Licentiate degrees ==
- Safety engineering Licenciate
- Business Administration Licenciate
- Educational technology Licenciate
- Tourism Business Administration Licenciate
- Enology Licenciate

== Technician degrees ==
- Computer Programming technician
- Tourism technician
- Hotel technician
- Enology technician
- Safety technician

== See also ==
- UTN
- Mendoza Province
