= Radical Civic Union =

Political party in Argentina

Coordinates: 34°36′42″S 58°23′29″W

Radical Civic Union Unión Cívica Radical
- Abbreviation: UCR
- President: Leonel Chiarella
- Vice Presidents: 1st: Olga Inés Brizuela y Doria 2nd: Javier Bee Sellares 3rd: María Inés Zigarán
- Secretary General: Piera Fernández de Piccoli
- Senate Leader: Eduardo Vischi
- Chamber Leader: Pamela Verasay
- Founded: 26 June 1891; 135 years ago
- Split from: Civic Union
- Headquarters: Adolfo Alsina 1786; Buenos Aires - Argentina
- Think tank: Alem Foundation
- Student wing: Franja Morada
- Youth wing: Juventud Radical de Argentina (Suspended from International Union of Socialist Youth)
- Membership (2023): 1,816,169 (2nd)
- Ideology: Social liberalism; Social democracy; Factions: Conservative liberalism; Historically: Radicalism
- Political position: Centre to centre-left
- National affiliation: None
- Regional affiliation: COPPPAL
- International affiliation: Socialist International
- Colors: Red White
- Anthem: "Marcha Radical"
- Seats in the Chamber of Deputies: 7 / 257
- Seats in the Senate: 10 / 72
- Governors: 5 / 24

Party flag

Website
- www.ucr.org.ar
- Politics of Argentina; Political parties; Elections; A: Disputed on whether it's apart of the UCR's core ideology or a faction.

The Radical Civic Union (Spanish: Unión Cívica Radical, UCR) is a major political party in Argentina. It has reached the national government on ten occasions, making it one of the most historically important parties in the country. Ideologically, the party has stood for radicalism, secularism and universal suffrage. Especially during the 1970s and 1980s, it was perceived as a strong advocate for human rights. Its factions however, have been more heterogeneous, ranging from conservative liberalism to social democracy.

Founded in 1891 by Leandro N. Alem, it is the second oldest political party active in Argentina. The party's main support has long come from the middle class. On many occasions, the UCR was in opposition to Peronist governments and declared illegal during military rule. Since 1995 it has been a member of the Socialist International (an international organisation of social democrat political parties).

The UCR had different fractures, conformations, incarnations and factions, through which the party ruled the country seven times with the presidencies of Hipólito Yrigoyen (1916-1922 and 1928-1930), Marcelo Torcuato de Alvear (1922-1928), Arturo Frondizi (1958-1962), Arturo Illia (1963-1966), Raúl Alfonsín (1983-1989) and Fernando de la Rúa (1999-2001). After 2001, the party has been particularly fragmented. As the Justicialist Party led by Nestor and Cristina Kirchner moved to the left, the UCR aligned itself with anti-Peronist centre-right parties.

From 2015 to 2023, the UCR was a member of the centre-right Cambiemos / Juntos por el Cambio coalition, along with Republican Proposal and Civic Coalition ARI, and supported Mauricio Macri in the 2015 and 2019 presidential elections. For the 2023 elections, the party supported the candidacy of Patricia Bullrich. The party is not currently in any coalition since Juntos por el Cambio's dissolution in 2023.

== History ==
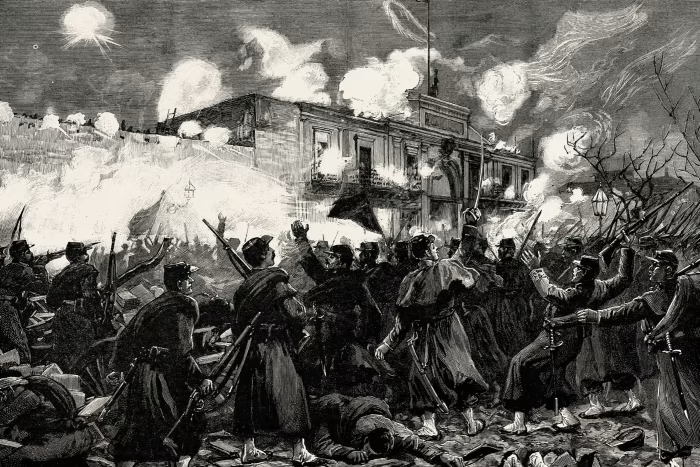
The Revolution of the Park of 1890.

The first logo of the UCR, first used in 1931.

The party was a breakaway from the Civic Union, which was led by Bartolomé Mitre and Leandro Alem. The term 'radical' in the party's name referred to its demand for universal male suffrage, which was considered radical at the time, when Argentina was ruled by an exclusive oligarchy and government power was allocated behind closed doors.

The Civic Union led an attempt to force the early departure of President Miguel Juárez Celman in the Revolution of the Park (Revolución del Parque). Eventually a compromise was reached with Juárez Celman's government. Hardliners who opposed this agreement founded the current UCR, led by Alem's nephew Hipólito Yrigoyen. In 1893 and 1905, the party led further attempts to overthrow the government.

With Alem's death in 1896, the party disbanded at the turn of the century before being revived by Yrigoyen in 1903. The party pressured the conservative government to implement democratic reforms. The party refused to participate in elections until universal adult male suffrage was introduced.

With the introduction of free, fair and confidential voting in elections based on universal adult male suffrage in 1912, the Party managed to win the general elections of 1916, when Hipólito Yrigoyen became president. As well as backing more popular participation, UCR's platform included promises to tackle the country's social problems and eradicate poverty. Yrigoyen's presidency however turned out to be rather dictatorial; he refused to cooperate with the Congress and UCR in government fell short of the democratic expectations it had raised when in opposition.

The UCR remained in power during the next 14 years: Yrigoyen was succeeded by Marcelo T. de Alvear in 1922 and again by himself in 1928. The first coup in Argentina's modern history occurred on September 6, 1930, and ousted an aging Yrigoyen amid an economic crisis resulting from the United States' Great Depression.

From 1930 to 1958, the UCR was confined to be the main opposition party, either to the Conservatives and the military during the 1930s and the early 1940s or to the Peronists during the late 1940s and early 1950s.

It was only in 1958 that a faction of the party allied with banned Peronists (in the Intransigent Radical Civic Union founded in 1956, splitting from what then called itself the People's Radical Civil Union) came back to power, led by Arturo Frondizi. The growing tolerance of Frondizi towards his Peronist allies provoked unrest in the army, which ousted the president in March 1962.

After a brief military government, presidential elections took place in 1963 with the Peronist Party banned (as in 1958). The outcome saw the candidate of the People's Radical Civic Union (the other party's faction) Arturo Illia coming first but with only 25% of the votes (approximately 19% of the votes were blank ballots returned by Peronists owing to their party being banned). Although Argentina experienced during Illia's presidency one of the most successful periods of history in terms of economic performance, the president was ousted by the army in June 1966. Illia's peaceful and ordered style of governing — sometimes considered too "slow" and "boring" - was heavily criticized at the time.

During the 1970s, Peronist government (1973–1976), the UCR was the second-most supported party, but this didn't actually grant the party the role of being the political opposition. In fact, the Peronist government's most important criticisms came from the same Peronist Party (now called Justicialist Party). The UCR's leader in those times, Ricardo Balbín, saluted Peron's coffin (Perón had died on July 1, 1974, during his third mandate as president) with the famous sentence "This old adversary salutes a great friend", thus marking the end of the Peronist-radical rivalry that had marked the pace of the Argentine political scene until then. The growing fight between left-wing and right-wing Peronists took the country into chaos and many UCR members were targeted by both factions. The subsequent coup in 1976 ended Peronist rule.

During the military regime, many members of the UCR were "disappeared", as were members of other parties.

Between 1983 and 1989, its leader, Raúl Ricardo Alfonsín, was the first democratically elected president after the military dictatorship headed by generals such as Jorge Videla, Leopoldo Galtieri and Reynaldo Bignone. Alfonsín was succeeded by Carlos Saúl Menem of the Peronist Justicialist Party (PJ).

The election of Mr. Alfonsin, who campaigned hard for clean government and civil rights, represented a fundamental change toward genuine democracy in Argentina.

In 1997, the UCR participated in elections in coalition with Front for a Country in Solidarity (FREPASO), itself an alliance of many smaller parties.

This strategy brought Fernando de la Rúa to the presidency in the 1999 elections. During major riots triggered by economic reforms implemented by the UCR government (with the advice of the International Monetary Fund), President de la Rúa resigned and fled the country to prevent further turmoil. After three consecutive acting presidents assumed and resigned their duties in the following weeks, Eduardo Duhalde of the PJ took office until new elections could be held.

After the 2001 legislative elections, the party lost and became the second-largest party in the federal Chamber of Deputies, winning 71 of 257 seats. It campaigned in an alliance with the smaller, more leftist FREPASO.

The party has subsequently declined markedly and its candidate for president in 2003, Leopoldo Moreau, gained just 2.34% of the vote, beaten by three Peronists and more seriously, by two former radicals, Ricardo López Murphy of Recrear and Elisa Carrió of ARI, who have leached members, support and profile from the UCR. Since Nestor Kirchner's led peronist PJ switched into political left, the UCR start to alliance with center-right anti-peronists.

In the 2005 legislative elections, the UCR was reduced to 35 deputies and 13 senators, but remains the second force in Argentine politics.

Ahead of the 2007 election, the remaining Radicals divided, between those who wanted to find an internal candidate and those who wanted to back a candidate from another movement, mostly former economy minister Roberto Lavagna, supported by former president Raúl Alfonsín.

In May 2005, the National Committee of the UCR, then led by Ángel Rozas, intervened (suspended of authorities of) the Provincial Committee of the UCR in Tierra del Fuego Province after Radical governor Jorge Colazo spoke in favour of Kirchner's reelection. The intervention was rejected by the Provincial Committee.

A party convention held in Rosario in August 2006 officially rejected the possibility of alliances with Kirchner's faction of Justicialism and granted former Party President Roberto Iglesias the permission to negotiate with other political forces. This led to several months of talks with Lavagna.

The continued dissidence of the Radicales K prompted the intervention of the UCR Provincial Committee of Mendoza on 1 November 2006, due to the public support of President Kirchner by Mendoza's governor, the Radical Julio Cobos. The measure was short-lived, as the Mendoza Province Electoral Justice overturned it three days later. Deputy and UCR National Committee Secretary General Margarita Stolbizer stated that the party is virtually "broken due to the stance of the leaders who support the alliance [with Kirchner]".

Roberto Iglesias eventually resigned the presidency of the party in November 2006 due to differences with Lavagna, having reached the conclusion that an alliance with him would be a mistake, and joined Stolbizer's camp, maintaining that the party should look for its own candidate (the so-called Radicales R). On 1 December 2006 the National Committee appointed Jujuy Province Senator Gerardo Morales as its new president. Morales stated that he wanted to follow the mandate of the Rosario convention (that is, looking for a possible alliance with Roberto Lavagna).

Morales went on to become Lavagna's running mate in the presidential election of October 2007, coming third. Although this campaign represented the mainstream of the national UCR leadership, substantial elements backed other candidates, notably the Radicales K. Cobos was elected vice president as the running mate of Cristina Fernández de Kirchner through the Plural Consensus alliance, and several Radicals were elected to Congress as part of the Kirchners' Front for Victory faction. The official UCR ranks in Congress were reduced to 30 in the Argentine Chamber of Deputies and 10 in the Argentine Senate.

In recent years, the UCR has been riven by an internal dispute between those who oppose and those who support the left-wing policies of Peronist President Cristina Fernández de Kirchner and her husband and predecessor Néstor Kirchner. However, most Radicales K support for the Kirchners ended by mid 2008, when Vice President Julio Cobos opposed the Government bill on agricultural export taxes. He later rejoined UCR, becoming a prominent figure in the opposition, despite being still the Vice President.

The UCR joined the Civic and Social Agreement to run for the 2009 elections. The loose coalition obtained 29% of the national votes and came a close second to the Front for Victory and allies national outcomes. The Party's reorganization, as well as the 2009 elections, resulted in a gain of party representatives in the National Congress.

In 2015, the UCR formed a coalition with Republican Proposal, a center-right political party, to form Cambiemos. Cambiemos won the presidential election, which ended its 12 years of opposition. The alliance with Republican Proposal was criticized by the Socialist International and the Young Radicals were suspended from the International Union of Socialist Youth. Since 2023 the UCR has been mostly in opposition to the Milei administration, while agreeing to negotiate individual reform bills.

== Ideology and factions ==
The UCR is generally classified as a centrist, or liberal. Due to its heterogeneity, the UCR has also been described as a big tent or catch-all party and social-liberal party, but it is also occasionally classified as a social-democratic. Radicals call themselves the party of civil liberties, democracy and the Constitution. In their history, they resisted authoritarian regimes, won universal suffrage and starred in the struggle for the causes of the popular majorities.

Raúl Alfonsín thought that radicalism advocated social democracy. He wanted to form a "broad popular, democratic, reformist and national movement"; to end privilege, authoritarianism and demagoguery and consolidate an authentic social democracy in the country. He also explained that Radicals do not define themselves, as European political parties usually do, on the left–right political spectrum, as radicalism is an ethic before being an ideology. However, according to Alfonsín, Radicals felt very comfortable as "observers" of all the tendencies that make up European social democracy. Moreover, in 1995 Raúl Alfonsín brought radicalism into the world organization of center-left parties, the Socialist International. Another former leader, Angel Rozas, defined the political-ideological identity of the party as humanist and center-left. He and his faction gave a progressive look to the party.

On the conservative side of the party sat Ricardo Balbín. The party was particularly divided since the 1960s and again since the end of the 1990s. After Balbín's death, Fernando de la Rúa who gave a neoliberal and conservative tint to the party and who famously said that "we are radicals, not socialists", kept UCR conservatives active until he became president in 1999.

During the 1989 general election, Eduardo Angeloz promised a "red pencil" to cut public deficit spending and mentioned the possible privatization of state companies, which would later be carried out by his rival, the Peronist Carlos Menem.

Since de la Rúa's demise in 2001, the UCR has become more and more fragmented politically and geographically. Besides the interventions in Tierra del Fuego and Mendoza, in September 2006, the party leaders had admitted that they reviewing requests of intervention against the provincial committees of Río Negro and Santiago del Estero. In Santa Fe, the UCR had teamed up with the Socialist Party to support Socialist candidate for governor Hermes Binner, in exchange for the vice-governorship, taken by the former governor Aldo Tessio's daughter, the fiscal federal Griselda Tessio, winning the 2007 elections.

The Unión Cívica Radical (UCR) has gradually shifted toward center-right positions since the 2005 legislative elections, due to internal divisions and the exclusion of the Alfonsinismo from its ranks. This political process has led the UCR to adopt a more conservative orientation in its focus and ideological alignment. According to the president of the party, "now within the organization we can find a centrist sector and another linked to right-wing values."

== Leaders ==
The UCR is headed by a National Committee; its president is the de facto leader of the party. A national convention brings together representatives of the provincial parties and affiliated organisations such as Franja Morada and Radical Youth, and is itself represented on the National Committee.

Presidents of the National Committee

- (1891-1896) Leandro N. Alem
- (1896-1897) Bernardo de Irigoyen
- (1897-1930) Hipólito Yrigoyen
- (1930-1942) Marcelo T. de Alvear
- (1942-1946) Gabriel A. Oddone
- (1946-1948) Eduardo Laurencena
- (1948-1949) Roberto J. Parry
- (1949-1954) Santiago H. del Castillo
- (1954-1957) Arturo Frondizi
- (1971-1981) Ricardo Balbín
- (1981-1983) Carlos Contín
- (1983-1991) Raúl Alfonsín
- (1991-1993) Mario Losada
- (1993-1995) Raúl Alfonsín
- (1995-1997) Rodolfo Terragno
- (1997-1999) Fernando de la Rúa
- (1999-2001) Raúl Alfonsín
- (2001-2005) Ángel Rozas
- (2005-2006) Roberto Iglesias
- (2006-2009) Gerardo Morales
- (2009-2011) Ernesto Sanz
- (2011) Ángel Rozas
- (2011) Ernesto Sanz
- (2011-2013) Mario Barletta
- (2013-2015) Ernesto Sanz
- (2015-2017) Jose Manuel Corral
- (2017-2021) Alfredo Cornejo
- (2021-2023) Gerardo Morales
- (2023-2025) Martín Lousteau
- (2025-present) Leonel Chiarella

== Splits ==
- Antipersonalist Radical Civic Union (1924)
- Radical Civic Union - Board Renewal (1945)
- Intransigent Radical Civic Union (1957)
- Civic Coalition ARI (2001)
- Recreate for Growth (2002)
- FORJA Concertation Party (2007)
- Generation for a National Encounter (2007)

== Focus: Yrigoyen presidency ==
In 1903, Hipólito Yrigoyen began to reorganize the UCR for a new revolution. Two years after he led the armed uprising known as the Revolution of 1905, which although it failed to put sufficient pressure on the official party, it was able to cause a party breakdown.

The more progressive leaders of the autonomists, such as Carlos Pellegrini and Roque Sáenz Peña, began to support that it was necessary to make institutional changes to hold back the growth of social and political conflict.

When Roque Sáenz Peña was elected president in 1910, the UCR already was not in the position to carry out new assembled uprisings, but the general belief that existed was that a revolution was imminent. Saénz Peña y Yrigoyen, who had been maintaining a personal friendship from childhood, they then had a private meeting in which they agreed to sanction a law of free suffrage. Two years later, in 1912, they approved the law of universal secret, and obligatory voting for men, known as The Sáenz Peña Law. On the other hand, it was also the first Argentinian political party to present a legal project for women to vote in 1919, that eventually did not pass given the conservative majority in Congress. Gabino Ezeiza was a great Payador, and he musically described the popular culture in favor of Yrigoyen.

The UCR put an end to their electoral political abstention, and went to the parliamentary elections, without forming electoral alliances. For the first time in Argentina, they voted in a voting booth to guarantee a secret ballot.

The predictable vote, the secret vote, and democracy. Before 1912, Argentina was using an electoral system in which votes were expressed verbally, or by ticket, in public place, and in a voluntary way, called the "predictable vote", which broke the electoral system. The struggle for democracy in Argentina, not related initially as much with universal suffrage but with the secret vote, in a voting booth, which made independent the wish of the voter from all external pressures. The Sáenz Peña Law of 1912 established the secret and obligatory vote, but due to the fact that it did not recognize the right of women to vote or to be voters, it is incorrect to say that Argentina had a truly universal voting system until 1947.

The UCR first won the elections to governor in Santa Fe (Manuel Menchaca), from which followed a trail of triumphs in the rest of the country.

Among the radical leaders at this time were: José Camilo Crotto (CF), Leopoldo Melo (CF), Vicente Gallo (CF), Fernando Saguier (CF), Marcelo T. de Alvear (CF), José L. Cantilo (CF), Delfor del Valle (PBA), Horacio Oyhanarte (PBA), Rogelio Araya (SF), Rodolfo Lehmann (SF), Enrique Mosca (SF), Elpidio González (CBA), Pelagio Luna (LR), Miguel Laurencena (ER), José Néstor Lencinas (Mza), Federico Cantoni (SJ).

The electoral triumphs of radicalism caused the collapse of the parties from the prior political system to the Sáenz Peña Law. The UCR auto-dispersed due to an initiative of Honorio Pueyrredón and its members massively joined radicalism. The National Autonomist Party dissolved.

On 2 April 1916, for the first time in Argentinian history, they carried out the presidential elections by means of a secret ballot. The UCR obtained 370,000 votes, against the 340,000 votes of all the other parties and in the Electoral College their way was put to a vote. Due to this, a long cycle of 14 consecutive years of radical government ensued. The Radical UCR won the presidential elections on three successive occasions: Hipólito Yrigoyen (1916-1922), Marcelo T. de Alvear (1922-1928), and Hipólito Yrigoyen once again (1928-1930). The series of radical governments would be violently interrupted by means of a military coup on December 6, 1930. The secret vote opened a new chapter in Argentinian History.

The government of the UCR indicated the arrival of the government and the direction of the state organization of members of the medial sects that until this moment were indeed excluded from these functions.

The first presidency of Hipólito Yrigoyen promoted a series of politics of a new type, which in conjunction was signaling a transformative nationalist tendency, between that which emphasized the creation of the state-owned oil business YPF, the new rural laws, the fortification of the public railways, the Reform University, and a strongly autonomous political exterior for the greatest improvements.

On the matter of labor, he propelled several laws for workers such as the law of the 8 hour work day and the law of Sunday rest, and he intervened as a neutral mediator in the conflicts between labor unions and big companies. However, during his time in government, several large worker massacres such as the Tragic Week, La Forestal massacre, and the Firing Squad Executions of Patagonia occurred, with thousands of workers killed. The historian Halperín Donghi explains that the radical governments resolved the problem of regional equality in Argentina, but as a consequence of this, they brought social inequalities to a higher level at the same time. This is because radicalism was lacking solutions for the people on the bottom of the social hierarchy, through systematically neglecting class differences.

Radicalism, during the first government of Yrigoyen, was in the minority in Congress: In the Deputy Chamber 45 members were radicals and 70 opposers, while amongst the 30 members of the Senate 4 were radicals. Nonetheless, Yrigoyen kept up an anti-accord force and a slightly inflammatory conversation and negotiation, not only with the traditional conservative parties that were controlling the senate, but also with the new popular parties that had gained leadership from the secret ballot: the Socialist Party and the Democratic Progressive party. Also, Yrigoyen took forward a political system of interventions to the provinces and a style of personal and direct management, that would be severely critical for his opposition both inside and outside of the UCR, calling it "personalism".
