= National Technological University =

Public university in Argentina

Coordinates: 34°36′16″S 58°22′22″W

- Universidad Tecnológica Nacional
- Seal of the National Technological University
- Former name: Universidad Obrera Nacional (National Workers' University)
- Type: Public
- Established: August 19, 1948
- Rector: Ing. Ruben Soro
- Vice-rector: Ing. Haroldo Avetta
- Students: 85,000
- Location: Various, Argentina
- Campus: Various
- Website: www.utn.edu.ar

The National Technological University (Spanish: Universidad Tecnológica Nacional, UTN) is a country-wide national university in Argentina, and considered to be among the top engineering schools in the country. Hosting over 85,000 students, its student body is comparable to Argentina's third-largest university (the National University of La Plata) and exceeded significantly only by the University of Buenos Aires (UBA) (over 300,000 students). It has 29 semi-independent branches of various sizes located all over the country.

The engineering programs taught at most of those locations are:

- Aeronautical Engineering
- Chemical Engineering
- Civil Engineering
- Electrical Engineering (program heavily focused on Power Systems Engineering)
- Electronic Engineering (program oriented towards electronics and telecommunications engineering)
- Industrial Engineering
- Information Systems Engineering
- Mechanical Engineering

It is the only national university in the country with a focus on engineering. Many of the available programs have an intermediate diploma as well, typically after completing up to the 3rd or 4th year (generally Analyst's and Technician's degrees). The university also offers a broad range of degrees at tertiary and postgraduate level, including those of specialist, master and doctorate (PhD) in Engineering.

Due to its strongly federalized approach, it is the only university with campuses across the country, graduating almost 50% of the new engineers in Argentina.

Research and Development is conducted in 18 official centers. Some of the areas these centers specialize in are: Chemical Engineering, Information Technology, Energy research, Environmental Science, Robotics, Mechanics, and Construction Engineering.

== Enrollment ==
As it is for most universities in Argentina, the only enrollment requirements are a secondary education degree and passing the university's entrance exam. Because of the low acceptance rate, it is common for applicants to take preparation courses given by either specialized private institutions, or by the university itself. Enrolling into the university's preparation courses given by the university itself does not require a minimum GPA. It only does so if the aspirant desires to take said preparation course before year's end, otherwise applicants are able to enroll in February courses freely, provided they have a valid high school diploma.

The students must declare the specialization of engineering they want to study at the moment of enrolling. If they wish to change it after their studies had begun, they have to take lectures in the specialized subjects. Only the foundational subjects are equivalent between degrees.

== Engineer's Degree ==
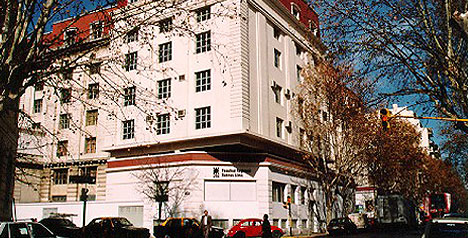
UTN Buenos Aires, the largest engineering college in Argentina

After completing a five to six years program (or typically after passing 45 final exams in a longer time period) students earn an Engineer's degree (Eng.), or Título de Ingeniero (Ing.) in Spanish. This is a professional degree with legal backing, enabling its graduates to perform any work in their chosen fields. All the programs include the same engineering foundational courses in Calculus, Physics, Algebra, Analytical Geometry, Probability, Statistics, Chemistry, Technical Drawing, Engineering in Society, Economics and Law.

Because of the length, breadth and rigid structure of the programs, and the declaration of intent during the enrollment process, the degrees are not equivalent to a Bachelor's degree. The objectives and the professional orientation of these programs are similar to those of a Master of Engineering, enabling graduates to apply for a PhD in Engineering or related disciplines after graduation. The programs comprise 3,600+ STEM clock hours of classes and labs, and include both a final Degree Thesis (Capstone Project) and Supervised Professional Practice in a real professional environment.

Some programs give students the option of getting an Intermediate Engineering Degree (IED) in their chosen fields after finishing the third or fourth year and completing an approved final project. The exact name of the IED varies depending on the field, for example the IED for the Chemical Engineer program is called University Chemical Technician, while the IED for Information Systems Engineer is University Information Systems Developer.

== Curricular Modernization ==
The curriculum has been going through a modernization process focused on analytic programs ("adecuación curricular"), and some careers have passed through a certification process ordered by the government agency CONEAU (Comisión Nacional de Evaluación y Acreditación Universitaria). The stated goal of this process is to start adapting the current model in accordance with the Bologna process.

== History ==
The National Technological University (Universidad Tecnológica Nacional, UTN) was established as the National Workers' University (Universidad Obrera Nacional) by Law 13229, signed by President Juan Perón on August 19, 1948. It was created to cover the lack of technical specialists in the country at that time. The degree granted was that of Factory Engineer in many specialties.

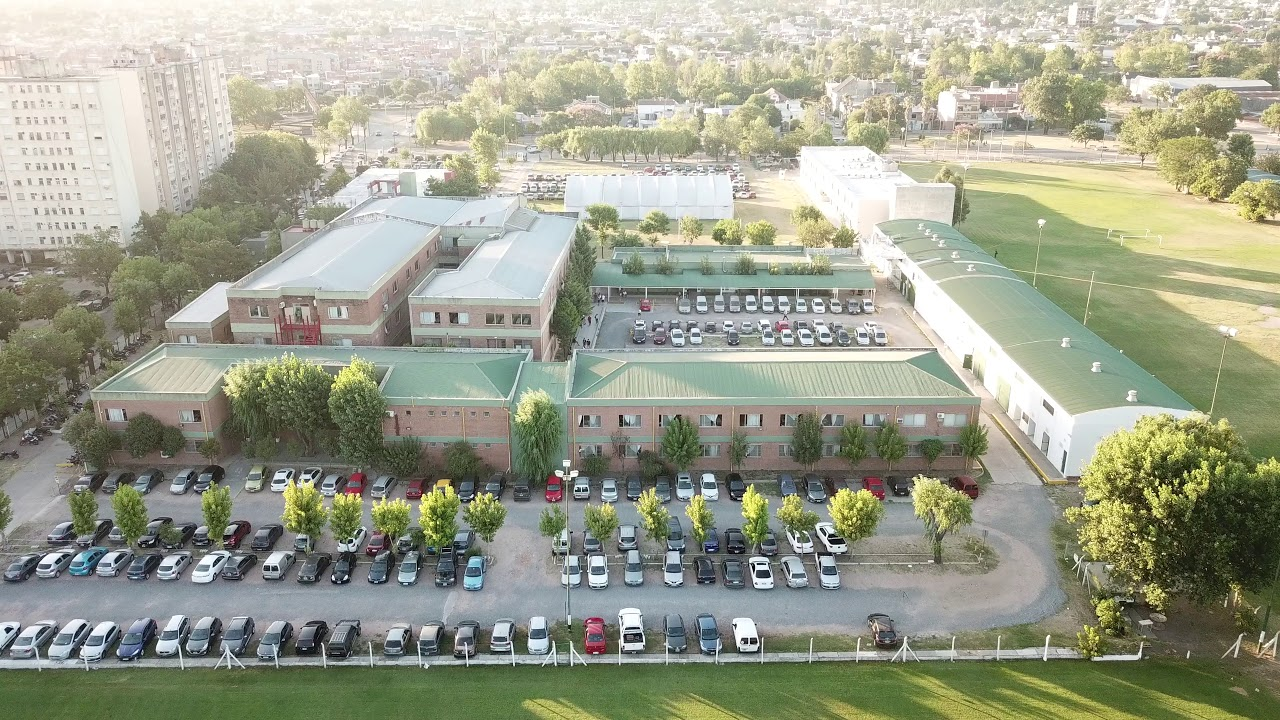
UTN Buenos Aires, campus headquarters

The university evolved rapidly. The necessity of professionals with a deeper knowledge was accomplished by big academic and organizational changes. By 1954 the University had 9 branches in Buenos Aires, Córdoba, Mendoza, Rosario, Santa Fe, Bahía Blanca, La Plata, Tucumán and Avellaneda.

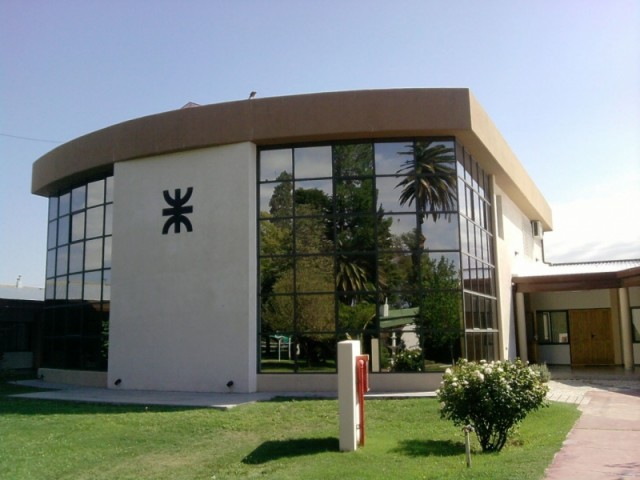
UTN. San Rafael campus

On October 14, 1959, the university was renamed as the National Technological University by law 14855. This marked the official beginning of the university as it is today.

Since then, more than 30,000 degrees in engineering have been granted. Today, the university maintains a strong network of international cooperation, and over 75 overseas institutions have signed cooperation agreements with the UTN.

== Branches ==
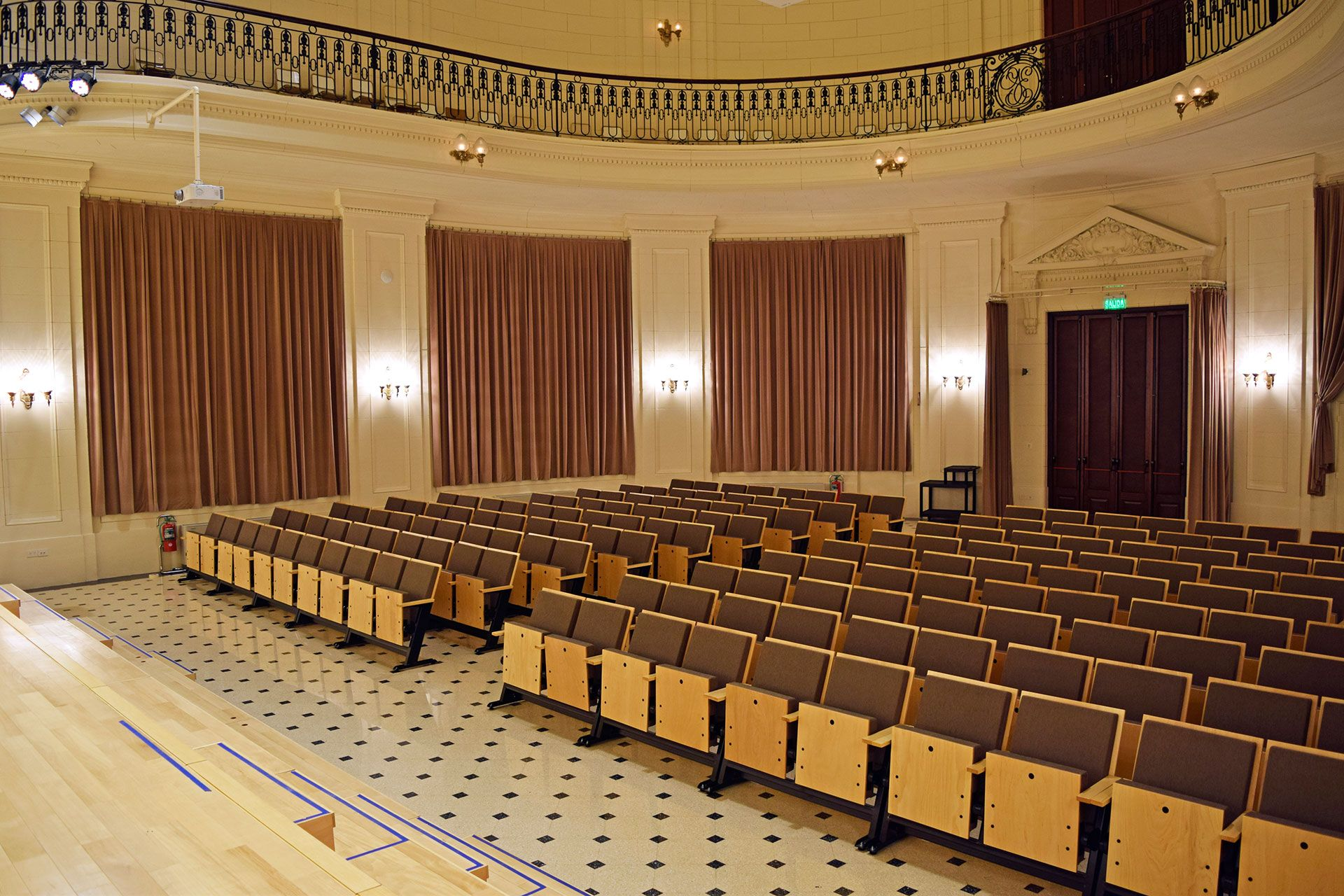
UTN Buenos Aires, lecture hall

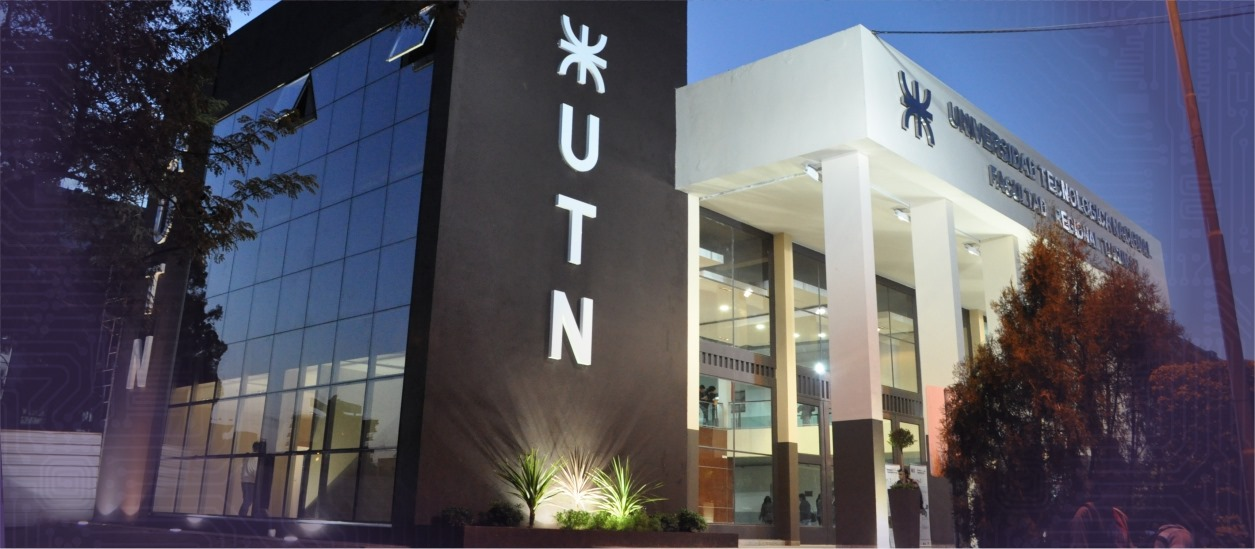
UTN. Tucumán campus

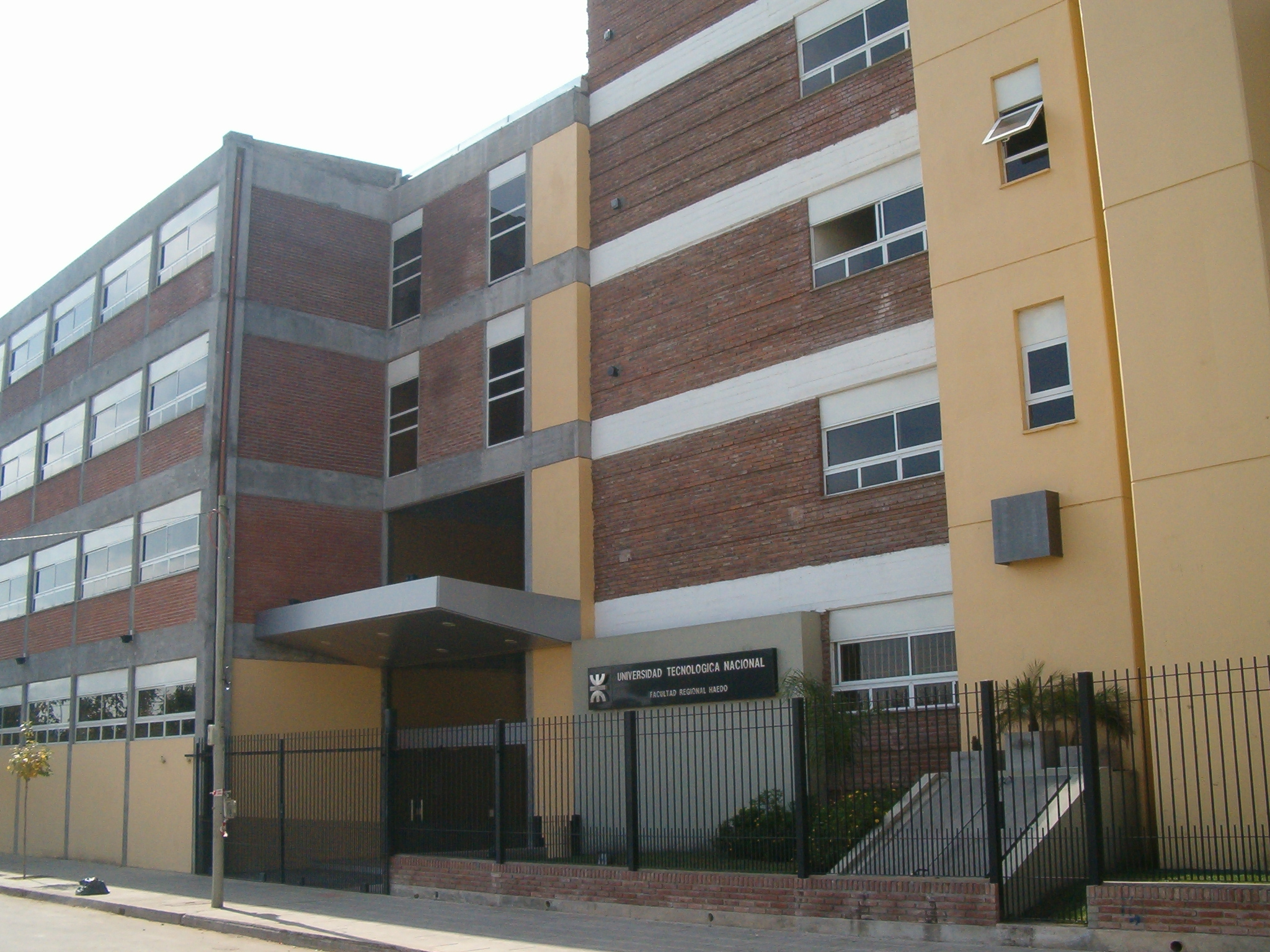
UTN, Haedo campus

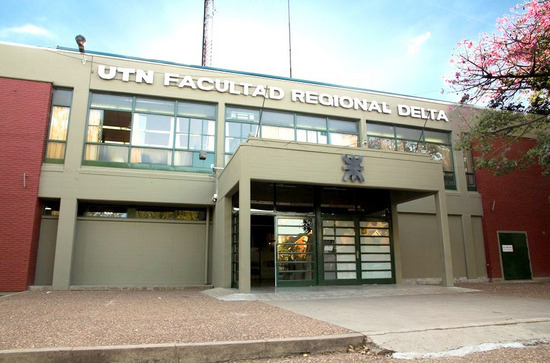
UTN, Delta campus

- Avellaneda Regional Faculty (FRA) Official website
- Bahía Blanca Regional Faculty (FRBB) Official website
- Buenos Aires Regional Faculty (FRBA) Official website
- Chubut Regional Faculty
- Concepción del Uruguay Regional Faculty (FRCU) Official website
- Concordia Regional Faculty
- Córdoba Regional Faculty (FRC) Official website
- Delta Regional Faculty (FRD) Official website
- General Pacheco Regional Faculty (FRGP) Official website
- Haedo Regional Faculty (FRH) Official website
- La Plata Regional Faculty (FRLP) Official website
- La Rioja Regional Faculty
- Mendoza Regional Faculty (FRM) Official website
- Neuquén Regional Faculty
- Paraná Regional Faculty (FRP) Official website
- Rafaela Regional Faculty
- Reconquista Regional Faculty
- Resistencia Regional Faculty (FRRE) Official website
- Río Grande Regional Faculty
- Rosario Regional Faculty (FRRO) Official website
- San Francisco Regional Faculty
- San Nicolás Regional Faculty
- San Rafael Regional Faculty
- Santa Cruz Regional Faculty
- Santa Fe Regional Faculty (FRSF) Official website
- Trenque Lauquen Regional Faculty
- Tucumán Regional Faculty (FRT) Official website
- Venado Tuerto Regional Faculty
- Villa María Regional Faculty
- National Higher Institute of the Technician Professorate - associated with UNT (INSPT) Official website

== Sports ==
The university has a competitive basketball team where some notable players such as Ernesto Oglivie, national team player for Panama, started their careers.

== See also ==
- List of universities in Argentina
