= 1884 in Argentina =

- Decades: 1860s; 1870s; 1880s; 1890s; 1900s
- See also: Other events of 1884; List of years in Argentina

The content below lists down the events in the year 1884 in Argentina.

== Incumbents ==
- President: Julio Argentino Roca
- Vice President: Francisco Bernabé Madero

=== Governors ===
- Buenos Aires Province: Dardo Rocha (until 1 May); Carlos Alfredo D'Amico (from 1 May)
- Cordoba: Gregorio Gavier
- Mendoza Province: José Miguel Segura (until 15 February); Rufino Ortega (from 15 February)
- Santa Fe Province: Manuel María Zavalla

=== Vice Governors ===
- Buenos Aires Province: Adolfo Gonzales Chaves (until 1 May); Matías Cardoso (starting 1 May)

== Events ==
- Passage of Argentine Law 1420

== Births ==
- January 30 - Pedro Pablo Ramírez, president of Argentina
- May 16 - José Buruca Laforia, goalkeeper
- August 13 - Agustín Bardi, tango musician
