= 1881 in Argentina =

- Decades: 1860s; 1870s; 1880s; 1890s; 1900s
- See also: Other events of 1881; List of years in Argentina

Events in the year 1881 in Argentina.

== Incumbents ==
- President: Julio Argentino Roca
- Vice President: Francisco Bernabé Madero

=== Governors ===
- Buenos Aires Province: Juan José Romero (until 1 May); Dardo Rocha (from 1 May)
- Cordoba: Miguel Juárez Celman
- Mendoza Province: Elías Villanueva (until 15 February); José Miguel Segura (from 15 February)
- Santa Fe Province: Simón de Iriondo

=== Vice Governors ===
- Buenos Aires Province: vacant (until 1 May); Adolfo Gonzales Chaves (starting 1 May)

== Events ==
- 23 July – A boundary treaty is signed by Argentina and the neighbouring country of Chile. The treaty is signed in Buenos Aires by Bernardo de Irigoyen, on the part of Argentina, and Francisco de Borja Echeverría, on the part of Chile, with the aim to establish a precise and exact borderline between the two countries based on the uti possidetis juris principle. Despite dividing largely unexplored lands, the treaty lays the groundwork for nearly all of Chile's and Argentina's current 5600 km of shared borders.
- 22 December – Limits of the Misiones Federation are agreed, leaving Posadas within the territory of what is now Corrientes Province.
- date unknown – The depreciated peso moneda corriente is replaced by the paper peso moneda nacional (national currency, (m$n or $m/n) at a rate of 25 to 1, the new currency is used until 1969

== Births ==
- 19 February – Gabino Coria Peñaloza, poet and lyricist (died 1975)
- 29 June – Ada Cornaro, actress and tango dancer (died 1961)
- 5 July – Enrique Muiño, Spanish-born Argentine actor (died 1956)
- 12 October – Carlos López Buchardo, classical composer (died 1948)
- 15 October – José Arce, physician, politician and diplomat (died 1968)
- 24 December – Delfina Bunge, writer and philanthropist (died 1952)

== Deaths ==
- 11 February – Salvador Jovellanos, Paraguayan leader who settled in Buenos Aires (born 1833)
- 6 October – Paul Günther Lorentz, German-born botanist (born 1835)
