= 1882 in Argentina =

- Decades: 1860s; 1870s; 1880s; 1890s; 1900s
- See also: Other events of 1882; List of years in Argentina

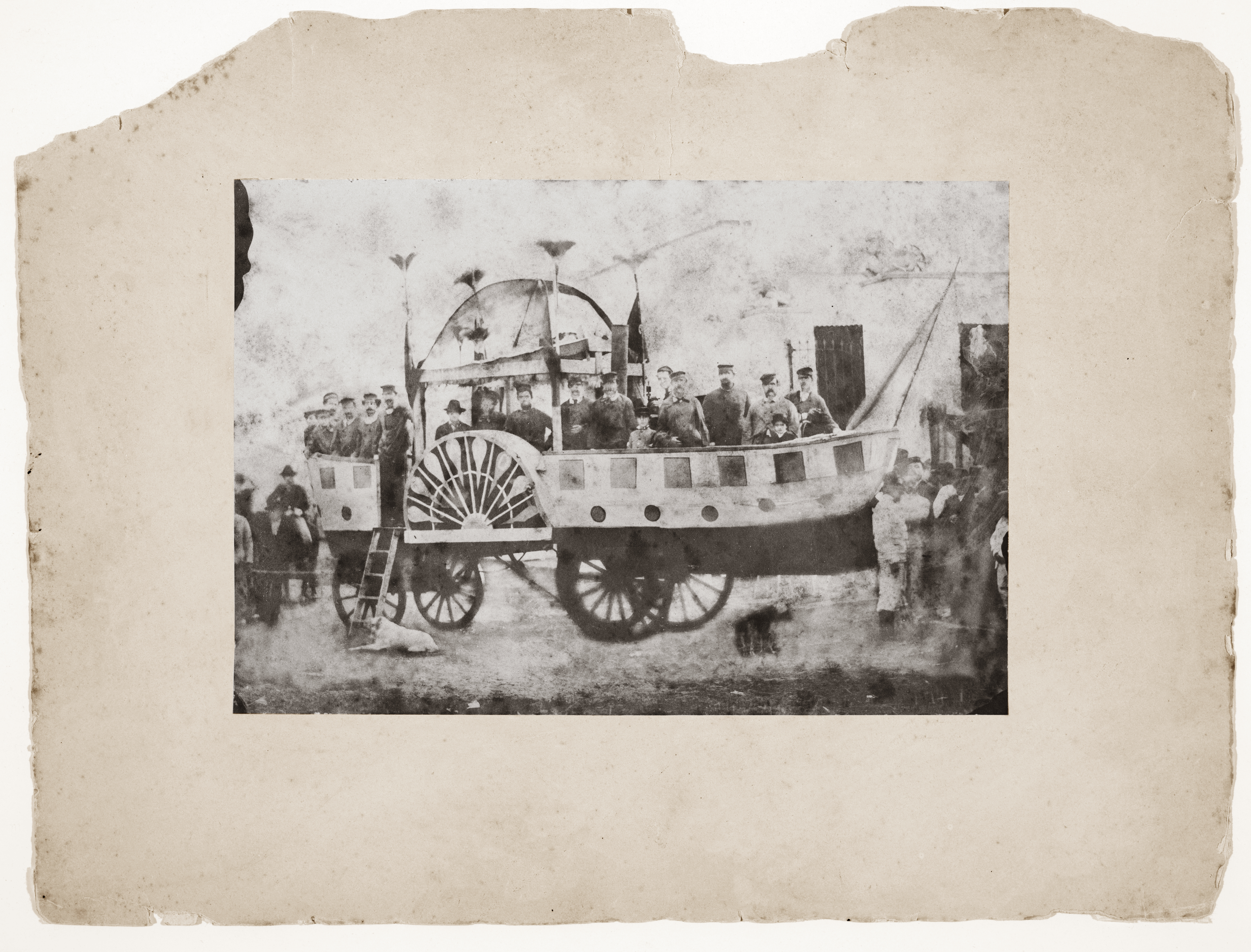
Carnival float pulled by eight horses, called "Great Progress of Santa Fe", which imitated the steamship "Primer Santafecino", Santa Fe, 1882.

== Incumbents ==
- President: Julio Argentino Roca
- Vice President: Francisco Bernabé Madero

=== Governors ===
- Buenos Aires Province: Dardo Rocha
- Cordoba: Miguel Juárez Celman
- Mendoza Province: José Miguel Segura
- Santa Fe Province: Simón de Iriondo then Manuel María Zavalla

=== Vice Governors ===
- Buenos Aires Province: Adolfo Gonzales Chaves

== Events ==
- Once railway station opens
- National Theatre is built
- South American Continental Exhibition is held
