= Plaza Moreno =

Square in La Plata, Argentina

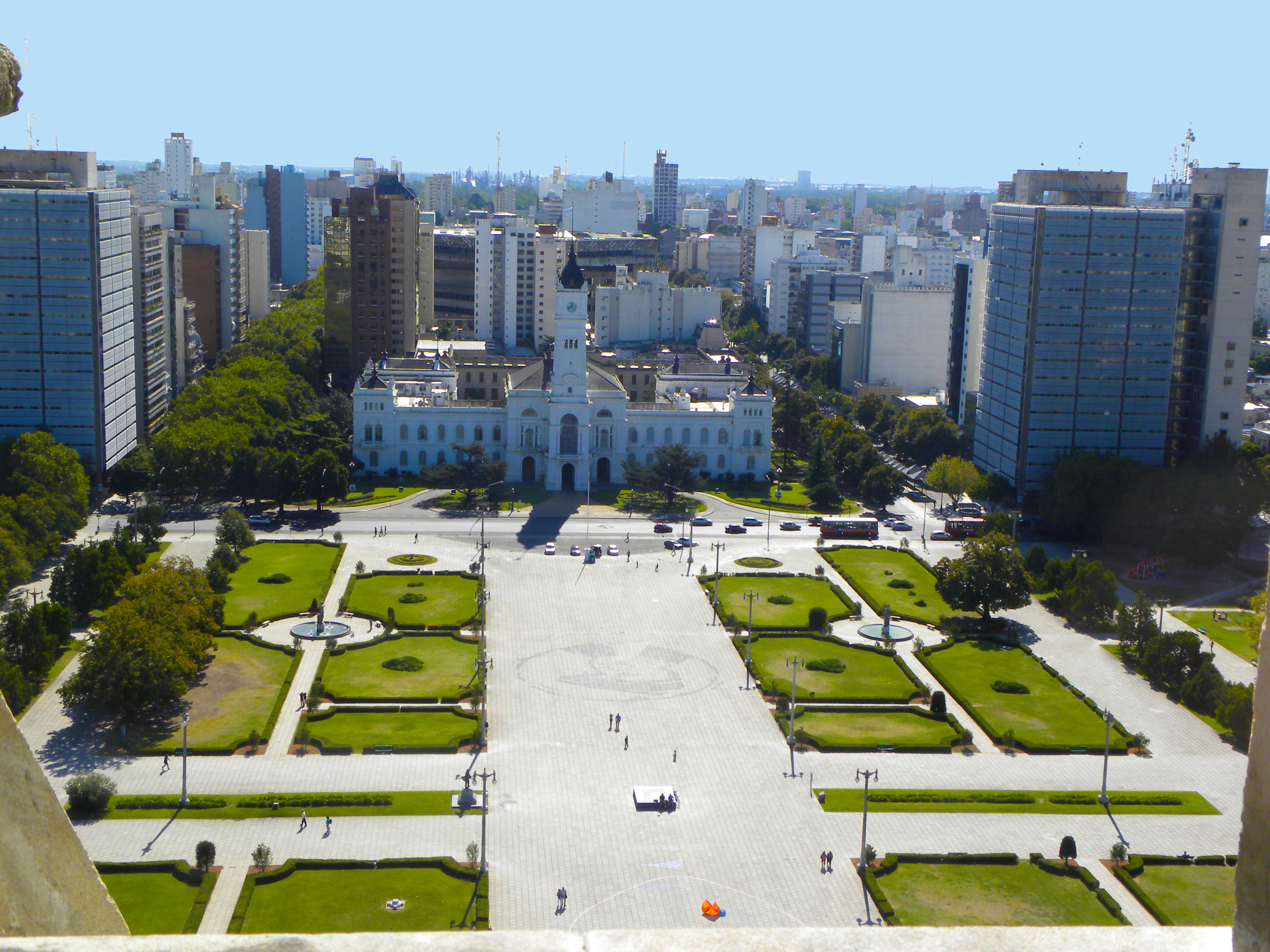
- Interactive map of Plaza Moreno
- Type: Public square
- Location: La Plata, Buenos Aires Province, Argentina Argentina
- Coordinates: 34°55′17″S 57°57′16″W
- Area: 7.2 ha (17.8 acres)
- Opened: 19 November 1882

Plaza Moreno is the central public square of La Plata, the capital of Buenos Aires Province, Argentina. Located at the geometric centre of the city's urban grid, it occupies nearly 8 hectares between streets 50, 54, 12 and 14, making it one of the largest public squares in Argentina. The square was the site of the founding ceremony of La Plata on 19 November 1882, when Governor Dardo Rocha laid the Piedra Fundacional (founding stone) at its centre. It is flanked on its southern edge by the Cathedral of La Plata and on its northern edge by the Municipal Palace, two of the most architecturally significant buildings in the city.

== History ==
=== Founding and early years ===
La Plata was designed from scratch in 1882 as the new capital of Buenos Aires Province, following a dispute over the federalisation of the city of Buenos Aires. Urban planner Pedro Benoit designed the city on a strict rationalist grid, with Plaza Moreno placed at its exact geometric centre. The square's symmetrical design reflected the 19th-century French aesthetic preferences of its planners.

On 19 November 1882, the founding ceremony of La Plata took place at Plaza Moreno. Governor Dardo Rocha presided over the event, which was attended by thousands of people who had travelled from across the country. A stone chest containing a lead urn was buried at the centre of the square; inside it were the founding act, a copy of the city plans, contemporary newspapers and other documents. At the ceremony, Rocha declared: "We have given the new capital the name of the magnificent river that bathes it, and we deposit under this stone, hoping that rivalries, hatreds, grudges and all the passions that have delayed the prosperity of our country will be buried here forever."

Until 1901 the square was known as Plaza Principal or Plaza Municipal. That year it was renamed in honour of Mariano Moreno, a lawyer, journalist and prominent figure of the Primera Junta of 1810. A monument to Moreno had stood in the square facing the Municipal Palace: an obelisk topped by a statue of Liberty, with a statue of Moreno near its base. In 1910 the monument was demolished and the statue of Moreno was relocated to the city of Pergamino, where it remains. A new statue of Moreno, created by sculptor Ricardo Dalla Lasta, was installed in the square in 1999.

=== 20th century redesigns ===
In 1912 four fountains representing the Four Seasons were added to the square, one in each quadrant. They were created by French artist Mathurin Moreau using cast iron and were initially positioned facing the corners of the square.

In the 1940s the original design of the square was significantly reformed. The central fountain was removed (replaced in 1961 by a mosaic bearing the coat of arms of La Plata), the sculptures El Océano and La Agricultura (1914) were relocated to Parque Saavedra and Plaza Olazábal, and the Four Seasons fountains were repositioned. Palm trees were removed and replaced with a variety of trees including lime trees, cedars and cypresses. New circulation paths were laid out to reflect the geometry of the city's broader urban plan.

The sculpture El Arquero Divino (The Divine Archer), created in 1924 by Troiano Troiani, was installed in the square in 1970. Troiani had been awarded a government scholarship to bring his works to Argentina. The sculpture was inspired by the Hercules the Archer by Antoine Bourdelle and was executed in the modelling style of Auguste Rodin. A local urban myth, since debunked, held that it was placed by members of Argentine freemasonry deliberately aiming toward the cathedral's cross as a statement against the Catholic Church.

In 1982, on the centenary of the city's founding, the Piedra Fundacional was opened and its contents briefly examined. The objects recovered, including coins and documents, are now displayed at the Museo Dardo Rocha. The capsule was resealed and is not scheduled to be reopened until 2082.

== Surrounding architecture ==
Plaza Moreno is bounded by several notable buildings that together form the civic and religious heart of La Plata.

The Municipal Palace (Palacio Municipal), on the northern edge along Street 12, was inaugurated in 1888. It was designed by German architect Hubert Stier and Ernesto Meyer in a Renaissance Revival style. Construction began in June 1883.

The Cathedral of La Plata, on the southern edge along Street 14, was opened for worship in 1902 but was not completed until 1999, when its neo-Gothic towers were finally finished. Designed by Pedro Benoit and Ernesto Meyer, it is the largest church in Argentina and ranks among the tallest churches in the world.

The Municipal Palace is flanked by two matching towers forming the Centro Administrativo Gubernamental (Government Administrative Centre) of Buenos Aires Province, known as Torre 1 and Torre 2. Designed in 1970, construction proceeded slowly and was not completed until 1987.

Other notable buildings on the edges of the square include the Escuela Normal Nacional No. 1 Mary O. Graham, opened in 1932, and the Museo Dardo Rocha, the former home of the city's founder, one of the oldest buildings in La Plata, dating from 1885.

== Features ==
The square contains 18 gardens with hedges and a variety of trees including cedars, cypresses and lime trees. At its geometric centre stands the Piedra Fundacional, a cornerstone commemorating the founding of the city. Every year the anniversary of the founding of La Plata is celebrated in the square with free concerts and fireworks.

== See also ==
- La Plata
- Cathedral of La Plata
- La Plata City Hall
- Dardo Rocha
- Pedro Benoit
- Mariano Moreno
