= 1883 in Argentina =

- Decades: 1860s; 1870s; 1880s; 1890s; 1900s
- See also: Other events of 1883; List of years in Argentina

== Incumbents ==
- President: Julio Argentino Roca
- Vice President: Francisco Bernabé Madero

=== Governors ===
- Buenos Aires Province: Dardo Rocha
- Cordoba: Miguel Juárez Celman then Gregorio Gavier
- Mendoza Province: José Miguel Segura
- Santa Fe Province: Manuel María Zavalla

=== Vice Governors ===
- Buenos Aires Province: Adolfo Gonzales Chaves

== Births ==
- January 21 - Elías Isaac Alippi
