= 1886 in Argentina =

- Decades: 1860s; 1870s; 1880s; 1890s; 1900s
- See also: Other events of 1886; List of years in Argentina

Events in the year 1886 in Argentina.

== Incumbents ==
- President:
  - Julio Argentino Roca (until 12 October)
  - Miguel Ángel Juárez Celman (from 12 October)
- Vice President:
  - Francisco Bernabé Madero (until 12 October)
  - Carlos Pellegrini (from 12 October)

=== Governors ===
- Buenos Aires Province: Carlos Alfredo D'Amico
- Cordoba: Gregorio Gavier then Ambrosio Olmos
- Mendoza Province: Rufino Ortega
- Santa Fe Province: Manuel María Zavalla then José Gálvez

=== Vice Governors ===
- Buenos Aires Province: Matías Cardoso

== Events ==
- 3 April – President Julio Argentino Roca, with the support of the agricultural elites – as well as of the London financial powerhouse, Barings Bank – fields his son-in-law, Córdoba Province Governor Miguel Juárez Celman, as the PAN candidate for president; he is elected almost unanimously.

== Births ==
- 23 February – Antonio Alice, painter (died 1943)
- 6 June – Salvador Mazza, epidemiologist (died 1946)
- 20 December – Celestino Piaggio, pianist, conductor and composer (died 1931)

== Deaths ==
- 1 February – Juan Esteban Pedernera, acting president in 1861 (born 1796)
- 21 October – José Hernández, journalist, poet, and politician (born 1834; heart disease)
