= 1885 in Argentina =

- Decades: 1860s; 1870s; 1880s; 1890s; 1900s
- See also: Other events of 1885; List of years in Argentina

This article is about events that occurred in 1885 in Argentina.

== Incumbents ==
- President: Julio Argentino Roca
- Vice President: Francisco Bernabé Madero

=== Governors ===
- Buenos Aires Province: Carlos Alfredo D'Amico
- Cordoba: Gregorio Gavier
- Mendoza Province: Rufino Ortega
- Santa Fe Province: Manuel María Zavalla

=== Vice governors ===
- Buenos Aires Province: Matías Cardoso

== Events ==
- June – Former president Nicolás Avellaneda travels to France with his wife, seeking medical treatment for nephritis. The treatment is unsuccessful and 48-year-old Avellaneda, Argentina's youngest-ever president, dies at sea on the return journey.
- 19 December – The city of Río Gallegos, Santa Cruz, is established, and a naval base created, to increase Argentine control over southern Patagonia.

== Births ==
- 7 January – Ernesto Brown, footballer (died 1935)
- 7 September – José Durand Laguna, football manager (died 1965)

== Deaths ==
- August – Saturnino María Laspiur, lawyer and politician (born 1829)
- 13 September – Roque Ferreyra, politician (born 1810)
- 24 November – Nicolás Avellaneda, 8th President of Argentina (born 1837)
