= 1956 in Argentina =

- Decades: 1930s; 1940s; 1950s; 1960s; 1970s
- See also: Other events of 1956; List of years in Argentina

Events in the year 1956 in Argentina.

== Incumbents ==
- President: Pedro Eugenio Aramburu
- Vice President: Isaac Rojas

=== Governors ===
- Buenos Aires Province: Juan María Mathet (until 15 November); Emilio A. Bonnecarrére (from 15 November)
- Mendoza Province: Héctor Ladvocat (until 9 May); Isidoro Busquets (from 9 May)

=== Vice Governors ===
- Buenos Aires Province: vacant

== Events ==
- January 22 – The Argentine Grand Prix is held in Buenos Aires and is won by Luigi Musso and Juan Manuel Fangio.
- March 5 – Enactment of Decree Law 4161/56
- June 9 – Juan Jose Valle launches a revolt against the government of President Aramburu. He and 26 others are executed after its failure.

== Films ==
- La pícara soñadora, starring Alfredo Alcón and Mirtha Legrand
- El Último perro, directed by Lucas Demare and starring Hugo del Carril and Gloria Ferrandiz

== Births ==
- Mario Cafiero, politician

=== January ===
- January 1 – Sergio Victor Palma, boxer
- January 14 – Francis Mallmann, chef
- January 19 – Adriana Acosta, militant and hockey player, missing person

=== February ===
- February 1 – Claudio Bonadio, judge

=== March ===
- March 9 – José Luis Manzano, businessman and former politician
- March 29 – Diana Conti, lawyer and politician

=== April ===
- April 6 – Sebastian Spreng, artist
- April 9 – Miguel Ángel Russo, footballer and manager

=== May ===
- May 12 – Sergio Marchi, Canadian politician and ambassador
- May 22 – Claudio Rissi, actor and stage director

=== June ===
- June 1 – Amanda Miguel, Mexican singer-songwriter
- June 29 – Pedro Caino, cyclist

=== August ===
- August 14 – Julio César Grassi, Roman Catholic priest and convicted child rapist
- August 23 – Cris Morena, television presenter and former fashion model

=== September ===
- September 1 – Juan Carlos Sánchez, footballer
- September 29 – Mónica Weiss, illustrator

=== October ===
- October 22 – Alejandro Kuropatwa, photographer

=== November ===
- November 10 – José Luis Brown, footballer and coach

== Deaths ==
- March 22 - Eduardo Lonardi, former president of Argentina from September–November 1955
- April 3 – Carlos Ibarguren, academic, historian and politician (born 1877)
- June 12 – Juan José Valle, Peronist military officer, executed by firing squad (born 1896)

== See also ==
- List of Argentine films of 1956
