= La Plata City Hall =

City government building in Argentina

Coordinates: 34°55′12″S 57°57′11″W

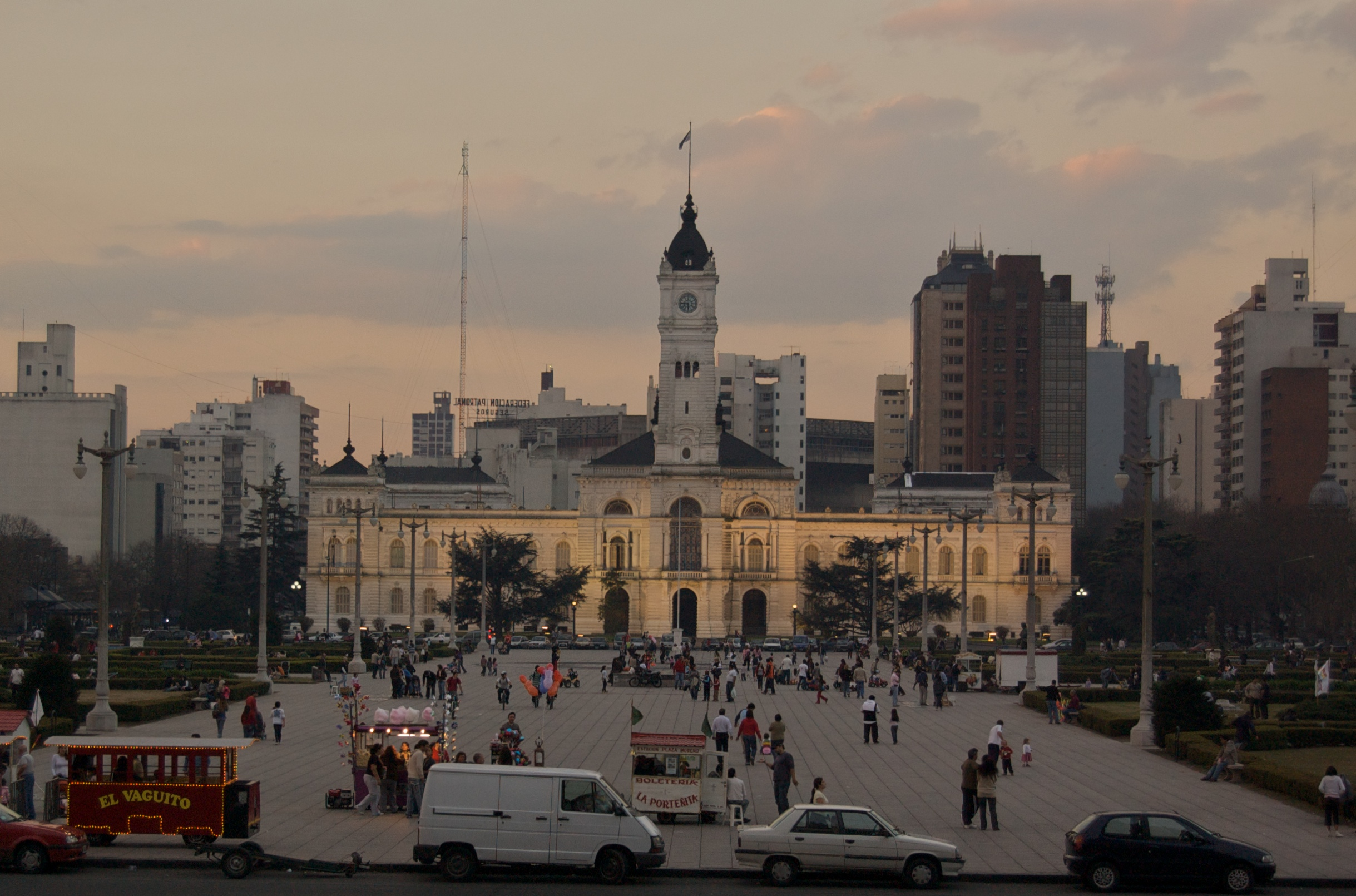
La Plata City Hall and Moreno Plaza

La Plata City Hall is the executive seat of government of the city of La Plata, the capital of Buenos Aires Province, Argentina.

== Overview ==
Governor Dardo Rocha's proposal for the establishment of a new capital for the paramount Province of Buenos Aires, useful to the mollification of the province's Independence-leaning gentry, was quickly approved by the Argentine Congress following the 1880 Federalization of Buenos Aires. Overseeing a furor of construction, Rocha inaugurated the city of La Plata on November 19, 1882, creating the first planned city in South America, and its first with electric lighting.

Planned by Pedro Benoit, La Plata's diagonal streets would be anchored by a central plaza, named in honor of Primera Junta statesman Mariano Moreno. Moreno Plaza is overlooked from the south by the Neogothic Cathedral, designed by Benoit and Ernesto Meyer, and from the north by City Hall, designed by Meyer and German architect Hubert Stier (who created the Hannover and Bremen Railway terminals, among other important works).

Construction on the project began in June 1883, and was completed in 1888. The 14,400 m^{2} (155,000 ft^{2}) building, an eclecticist design based on German Renaissance Revival architecture, features Romanesque interiors, including two courtyards, City Council chambers, and the Salón Dorado ("Gold Room"), a formal reception hall accessed via a grand, marble staircase, set in Slovenian oak floors, and featuring German vitreaux, and a 1.2 ton spider chandelier.
