= 1958 in Argentina =

- Decades: 1930s; 1940s; 1950s; 1960s; 1970s
- See also: Other events of 1958; List of years in Argentina

The following events occurred in Argentina in the year 1958.

== Incumbents ==
- President:
  - Pedro Eugenio Aramburu (until April 30)
  - Arturo Frondizi (from May 1)
- Vice President:
  - Isaac Rojas (until April 30)
  - Alejandro Gómez (from November 18)

=== Governors ===
- Buenos Aires Province:
  - Emilio A. Bonnecarrére (until 2 May)
  - Oscar Alende (from 2 May)
- Cordoba: Arturo Zanichelli (from month unknown)
- Chubut Province: Jorge Galina (from month unknown)
- Mendoza Province:
  - Isidoro Busquets (until 1 May)
  - Ernesto Ueltschi (from 1 May)
- Santa Fe Province:
  - Luis Cárcamo (until month unknown)
  - Carlos Sylvestre Begnis (from month unknown)

=== Vice Governors ===
- Buenos Aires Province: vacant (until 2 May); Arturo Crosetti (starting 2 May)

== Events ==
- February 14 – Prince Heinrich of Bavaria is killed in a car accident at San Carlos de Bariloche in the Andes. His body is returned to Bavaria for burial.
- February 23 – In the 1958 Argentine general election, the Intransigent Radical Civic Union wins 47% of the vote, on a record turnout of 90.9%, while its leader, Arturo Frondizi, is elected to the presidency.
- April 3 – Bill Haley & His Comets play the first of a series of concerts in Buenos Aires.
- May 1 – Arturo Frondizi is inaugurated as President of Argentina.
- June 27 – The Peronist Party becomes legal again in Argentina, three years after being outlawed.
- November 18 – Alejandro Gómez resigns as vice president after being expelled from his party.

== Films ==
- See List of Argentine films of 1958

== Births ==
- July 21 – Liliana Bodoc, fantasy writer (d. 2018)

== Deaths ==
- August 9 – Felipe Boero, composer (b. 1884)

== See also ==
- 1958 in Argentine football
