= Kuropatwa =

Kuropatwa is a Polish surname coming from the noble Polish Kuropatwa families: of Srzeniawa coat of arms and Jastrzębiec coat of arms.

- Alejandro Kuropatwa (1956–2003), Argentine photographer
- Aleksander Kuropatwa (died 1709), chancellor of the Lviv cathedral chapter in 1698, canon of the Lviv cathedral chapter in 1682–1698, deputy to the Main Crown Tribunal in Lublin in 1695
- Elżbieta Janiszewska-Kuropatwa (born 1946), Polish engineer, academic teacher, civil servant, economist, politician
- Jan Kuropatwa (died 1462), courtier of Queen Zofia Holszańska, chamberlain of Lublin, starost of Sanok, Chełm and Oświęcim, marshal of the royal court
- Ludwik Kuropatwa (1924–2019), colonel of the Polish People's Army, long-time commander of the Feliks Dzerzhinsky Central Training Center of the Military Internal Service
- Mikołaj Kuropatwa (died 1618), stolnik of Halych
- Stanisław Kuropatwa (died 1520), castellan of Chełm in 1496, starost of Chełm in 1501–1502, starost of Parczew in 1484–1515, royal courtier in 1485
