= Adolfo Gonzáles Chaves Partido =

Adolfo Gonzales Chaves
- Department
- Flag

- Country: Argentina
- Province: Buenos Aires
- Established: August 22, 1916
- Founded by: provincial law 3,632
- Seat: Adolfo Gonzales Chaves

Government
  - Intendant: Miriam Lucía Gómez (UCR)

Area
  - Total: 3,780 km^{2} (1,460 sq mi)

Population
  - Total: 12,037
  - Density: 3.18/km^{2} (8.25/sq mi)
- Demonym: chavense
- Postal Code: B7513
- IFAM: BUE002
- Area Code: 02983
- Patron saint: San José
- Website: gonzaleschaves.gob.ar

Adolfo Gonzales Chaves is a partido of Buenos Aires Province in Argentina, it is located at coordinates 38°02′S 60°05′W.

The provincial subdivision has a population of 12,496 inhabitants in an area of 3,780 km^{2} (1,460 sq mi), and its capital city is Adolfo Gonzales Chaves, which is located around 470 km (290 mi) from Buenos Aires.

The province was founded on August 22, 1916, and the people are known as chavense.

== Economy ==
The economy of Adolfo Gonzales Chaves Partido is dominated by agriculture. The main agricultural products of the district are; wheat, maize, sunflowers, barley oats, linseed and sorghum. Other industries include traditional rural work such as carpenters, masons and blacksmiths.

== Towns ==
- Adolfo Gonzales Chaves (pop 8,613)
- Álzaga
- De La Garma (pop 1,801)
- Juan Eulogio Barra (pop 252)
- Pedro Próspero Lasalle
- Vasquez (pop 35)
