= 1955 in Argentina =

- Decades: 1930s; 1940s; 1950s; 1960s; 1970s
- See also: Other events of 1955; List of years in Argentina

Events in the year 1955 in Argentina.

== Incumbents ==
- President: Juan Peron until September 21, Eduardo Lonardi until November 12, Pedro Eugenio Aramburu
- Vice President: Alberto Teisaire until September 23, Isaac Rojas

=== Governors ===
- Buenos Aires Province:
  - until 25 September: Carlos Aloé
  - 25 September-10 November: Arturo Ossorio Arana
  - from 10 November: Juan María Mathet
- Cordoba: Raúl Lucini
- Mendoza Province:
  - until 15 September: Carlos Horacio Evans
  - 15 September-13 December: Roberto Nazar
  - from 13 December: Héctor Ladvocat

=== Vice Governors ===
- Buenos Aires Province: vacant

== Events ==
- June 16 - Bombing of Plaza de Mayo: failed attempt by Argentine Naval Aviation to overthrow President Peron
- September 16 - Revolución Libertadora: Peron overthrown
- September-Major General Eduardo Lonardi took office as president. He wanted to rebuild the democratic government, but was overthrown.
- September- Major General Pedro Eugenio Aramburu overthrew Lonardi.

== Deaths ==
- June 16 - Benjamín Gargiulo, vice-admiral, suicide

== See also ==
- List of Argentine films of 1955
