= La Plata Cemetery =

Cemetery in La Plata, Argentina

- Cementerio de La Plata
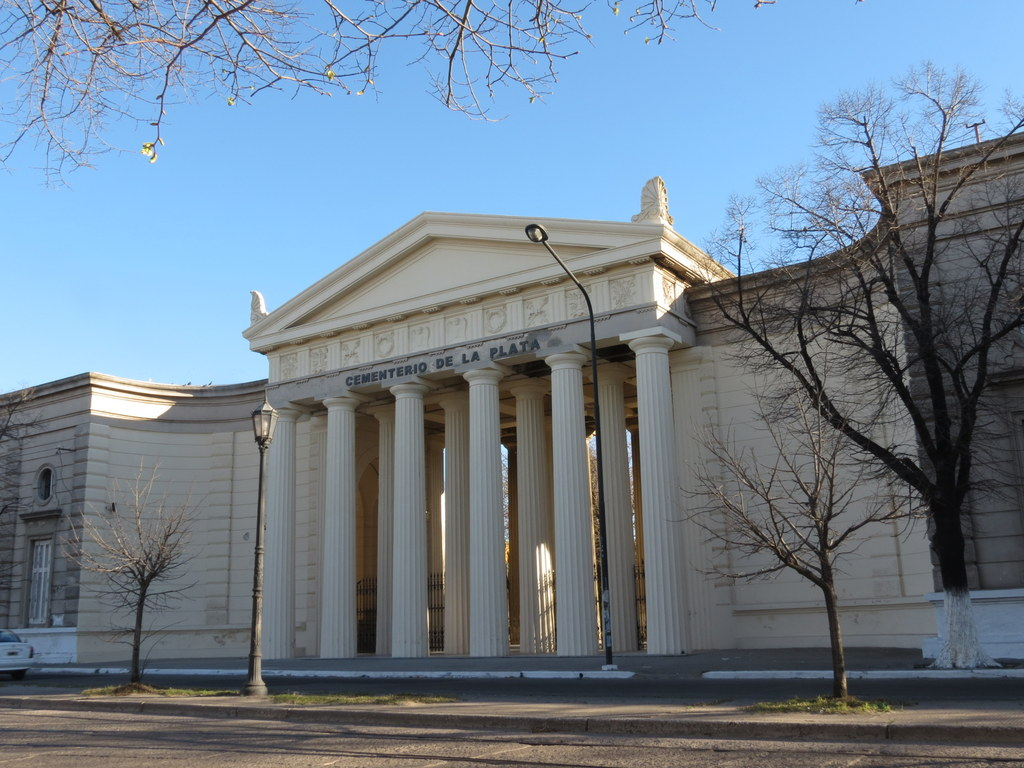
- Main entrance in 2012.
- Interactive map of La Plata Cemetery

Details
- Established: 1886
- Location: 131 y 72, La Plata
- Country: Argentina
- Coordinates: 34°57′20″S 57°57′06″W
- Size: 32 hectares (79 acres)

The Cemetery of La Plata (Spanish: Cementerio de La Plata) is one of the most important cemeteries in Buenos Aires Province, Argentina. It is located on the intersection of Avenue 31, 72 and diagonal 74 in Altos de San Lorenzo, La Plata. It was declared a Cultural Heritage and Memorial of Buenos Aires Province.

It was established in 1886 and designed by Pedro Benoit, who was also responsible for the design of the city. Some of its most remarkable architectural features are its main entrance and its many family vaults, which include neoclassical, Neo-Gothic, Art Nouveau (in its variant of Catalan Art Nouveau), Art Deco and Egyptian revival styles. The main entrance is an impressive neo-classical portico with Doric columns. The Catholic chapel, in Romanesque revival style, was finished in 1950.

Its annex, the Jewish Cemetery, belongs to the Asociación Mutual Israelita Argentina in La Plata and is located on Avenue 72.

== Bibliography ==
- Colombo, Nicolás (2016). Misterios de la ciudad de La Plata. Self-published. ISBN 978-987-42-0135-5.
- Sempé, María Carlota; Flores, Olga Beatriz (2011). El Cementerio de La Plata y su contexto histórico. Self-published. ISBN 978-987-33-0640-2.
- Dematti de Alaye, Adelina (2014). La marca de la infamia. Asesinatos, complicidad e inhumaciones en el cementerio de La Plata. Ministerio de Justicia y Derechos Humanos de la Nación. ISBN 978-987-3720-03-1.
