= Adriana Acosta =

Adriana Inés Acosta (Lomas de Zamora, 19 January 1956 – disappeared on 27 May 1978 in Buenos Aires) was an Argentine militant and field hockey player who was kidnapped by the military dictatorship that ruled Argentina from 1976 to 1983. On 1972 she integrated and was captain of the metropolitan champion youth team Lomas Athletic Club. On 1973 she was captain of the Buenos Aires team that won the Argentine championship. She also integrated the youth and the national field hockey team. During the dictatorship that took the power on 1976, she maintained a militancy against the regime. She was kidnapped on 27 May 1978, when she was 22 years old, and was taken to the clandestine detention center known as El Banco. She is still missing since then.

In her memory, the field hockey court in the CeNARD, has her name.
