= Mario Cafiero =

Argentine politician (died 2020)

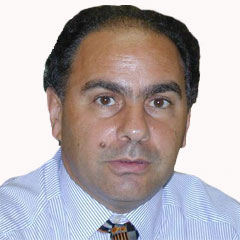
Mario Cafiero

Mario Cafiero (1956 – 13 September 2020) was an Argentine politician who served as a Deputy.
