= Pedro Benoit =

Argentine architect, engineer, and urbanist

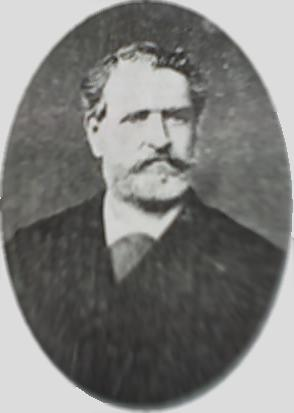
- Born: February 18, 1836; Buenos Aires, Argentina
- Died: April 4, 1897 (aged 61); La Plata, Argentina
- Occupations: Engineer and urban planner
- Known for: Master plan for the city of La Plata

Pedro Benoit (February 18, 1836 – April 4, 1897) was an Argentine architect, engineer, and urbanist best known for designing the layout of La Plata City.

== Life and times ==
Pedro Benoit was born in Buenos Aires in 1836 to María Josefa de las Mercedes Leyes and Pierre Benoît', a French émigré who had left his homeland following the Bourbon Restoration. His father, a trained architect, engineer and topographer instilled his interests in his son, who enrolled in 1850 at the Topography and Geodesics School of the Department of Engineering of the Province of Buenos Aires.

Gaining his first professional experience designing pontoon bridges for the Argentine Army, Benoit was contracted as a surveyor for the city of Buenos Aires. In this capacity, in 1858 he planned the first road to Ensenada, a harbor town 35 miles (56 km) south of Buenos Aires. The young surveyor was inducted into a local Freemason lodge in 1858 and the following year, he was commissioned by prominent local landowner Juan Dillon to design the urban layout for what became Merlo (a suburb west of Buenos Aires).

Benoit designed Merlo following patterns similar to those used by Pierre L'Enfant to design Washington, DC. Benoit relocated to the city he helped build, designing for it the first school and the Church of Our Lady of Mercy in 1863, still the city's central Roman Catholic church; Benoit's professed Freemasonry caused the Bishop of Buenos Aires, Monsignor Mariano Escalada, to deny the new parish a priest, however.

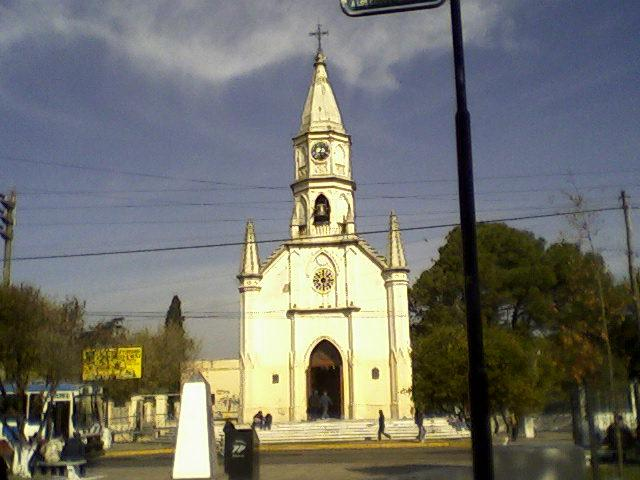
The Church of Our Lady of Mercy

Benoit continued his duties as Director of the Department of Topography, planning the rectification of the Riachuelo River flowing south of Buenos Aires, then prone to flooding. His diverse training allowed Benoit an appointment to Merlo's Committee on Public Health in 1867, when he designed the Santa Isabel Cemetery. Remaining at the Topography Department, he plotted a tramway line between Ensenada and Tolosa, two small cities southeast of Buenos Aires. A prominent Spanish Argentine landowner, Manuel Rodríguez Fragio, commissioned Benoit in 1872 to design the master plan for another new city, Ituzaingó (not far from Merlo), and towards 1880, Benoit returned to Buenos Aires to help design the new ramparts for what would later become Puerto Madero. These efforts earned him the honor of Lieutenant Colonel of the Argentine Corps of Engineers.

=== La Plata ===
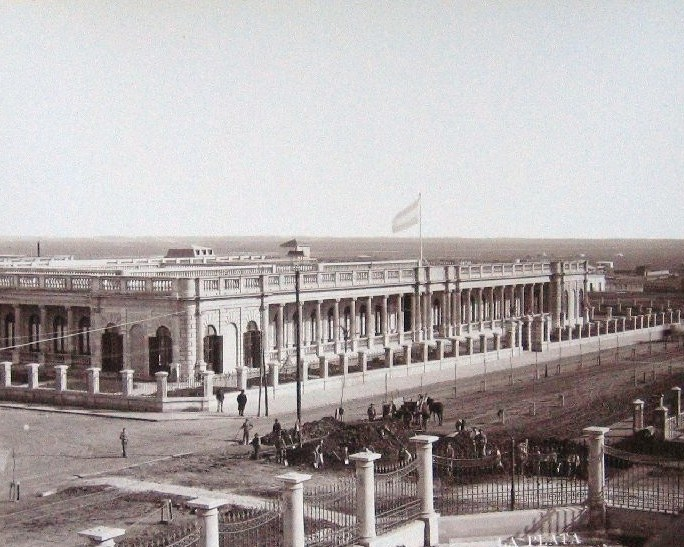
The old Economy Ministry building

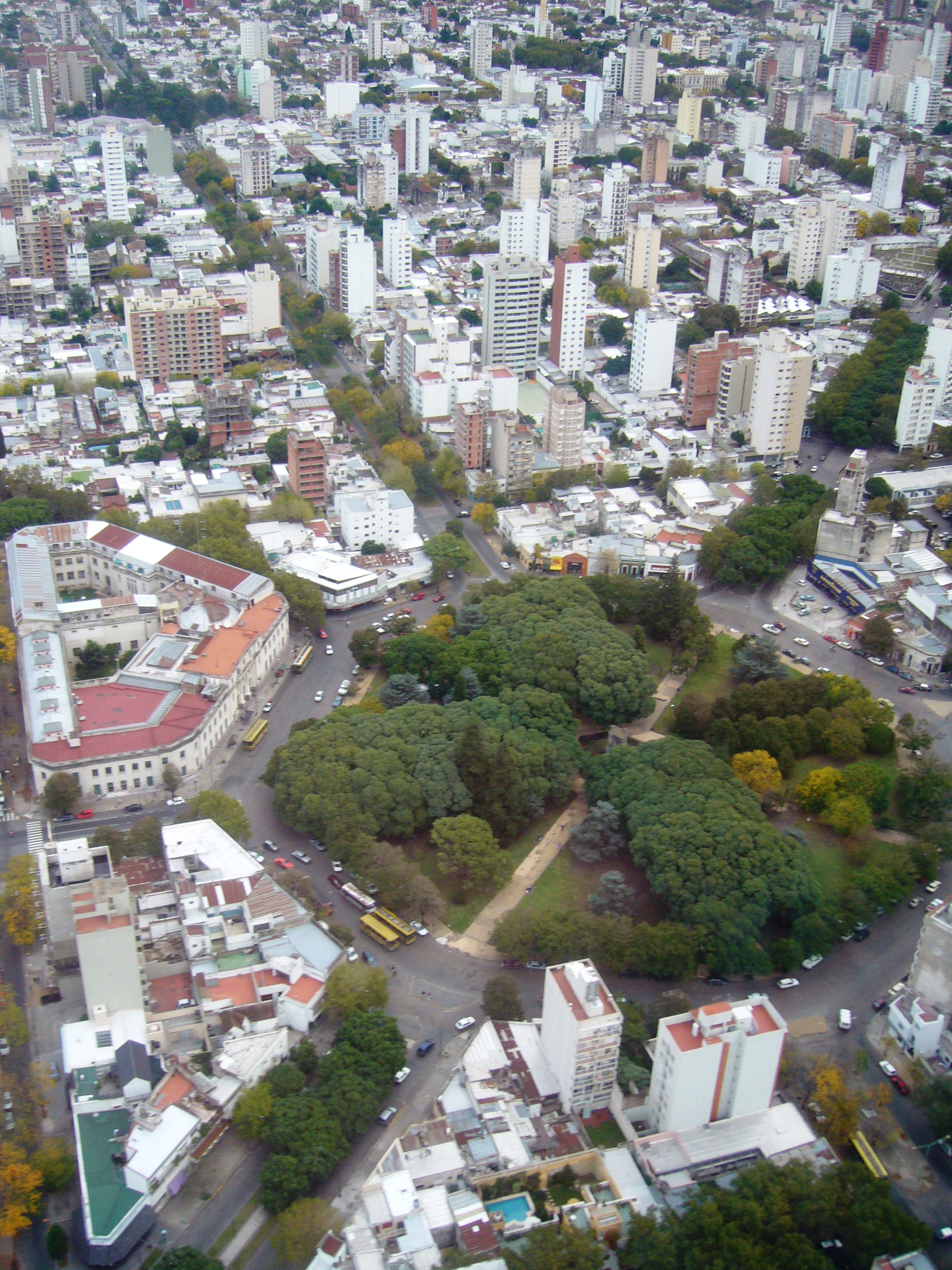
Aerial view of La Plata's diagonals and plazas, as planned by Benoit

Ongoing resentment over the apportionment of rapidly growing customs duties from the main port led to a failed insurrection in the Province of Buenos Aires against the newly elected administration of President Julio Roca in 1880. The province's voters, however, elected a candidate in 1881 who, despite his disadvantage in belonging to Roca's PAN, articulated a message of political integration with the suddenly prosperous Argentina: Dardo Rocha. Facing ongoing secessionist pressures from his constituency, Governor Rocha proposed the creation of a new provincial capital in replacement of the city of Buenos Aires, which was federalized as the nation's capital in 1880. The proposal, useful to the mollification of the province's Independence-leaning gentry, was quickly approved by Congress.

Governor Rocha commissioned Benoit to plan the new city, which became the renowned urbanist's most ambitious project. Named La Plata after its mention in José Hernández's epic Martín Fierro, the city was planned by Benoit in a regular pattern of diagonals and precisely-placed squares.

Benoit chose to echo the design of Buenos Aires in his plan for La Plata, particularly in his use of diagonals, small squares, and architectural styles. Some technical details, such as the cemetery location at the far end of a road that begins at the Río de la Plata, have been noted as containing deep symbolism for life beginning in the water and ending in the east.

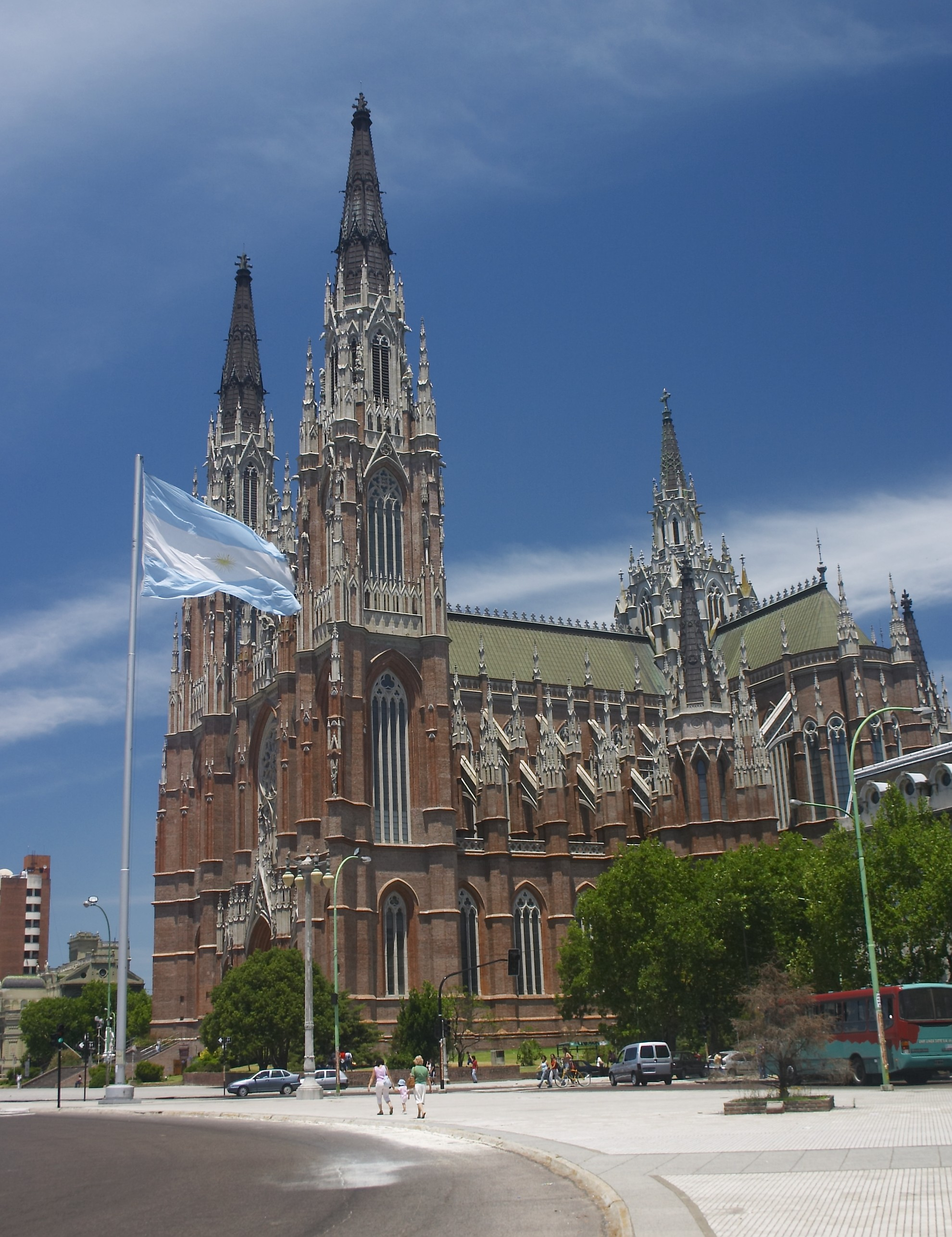
The La Plata Cathedral

Benoit, as technical director of the urbanist project, designed most of the early public buildings in La Plata, as well. His designs for the La Plata Observatory, Economy Ministry, Police Headquarters, Engineering Department and Governors' Offices were completed shortly after the city's November 19, 1882, christening. Giving the city its first house of worship, the Church of Saint Pontian, Benoit designed the Cathedral of La Plata with Ernesto Meyer (the architect of the German Renaissance revivalist City Hall) in 1884. The Neogothic cathedral, the second-largest of its kind in the world, was only completed in 1999. He also designed La Plata Cemetery (established 1886). The tireless urbanist was also commissioned to design master plans for Quilmes, San Pedro and Mercedes, all important cities in the Province of Buenos Aires.

His master plan for the city earned Benoit two gold medals at the 1889 Paris Universal Exposition, where it was honored as the "City of the Future." Benoit was elected to the La Plata City Council the following year, during which he designed his city's great seal, and as Mayor in 1893. Keeping a busy schedule, he also accepted a post as the Director of the Provincial Mortgage Bank and as the first Dean of the School of Engineering in the newly created University of La Plata, in 1897.

The strain proved too much for Benoit, however, who died suddenly that year, at age 61. He is buried in La Recoleta Cemetery.
