= Cathedral of La Plata =

- Cathedral of the Immaculate Conception
- Catedral de la Inmaculada Concepción (Spanish)
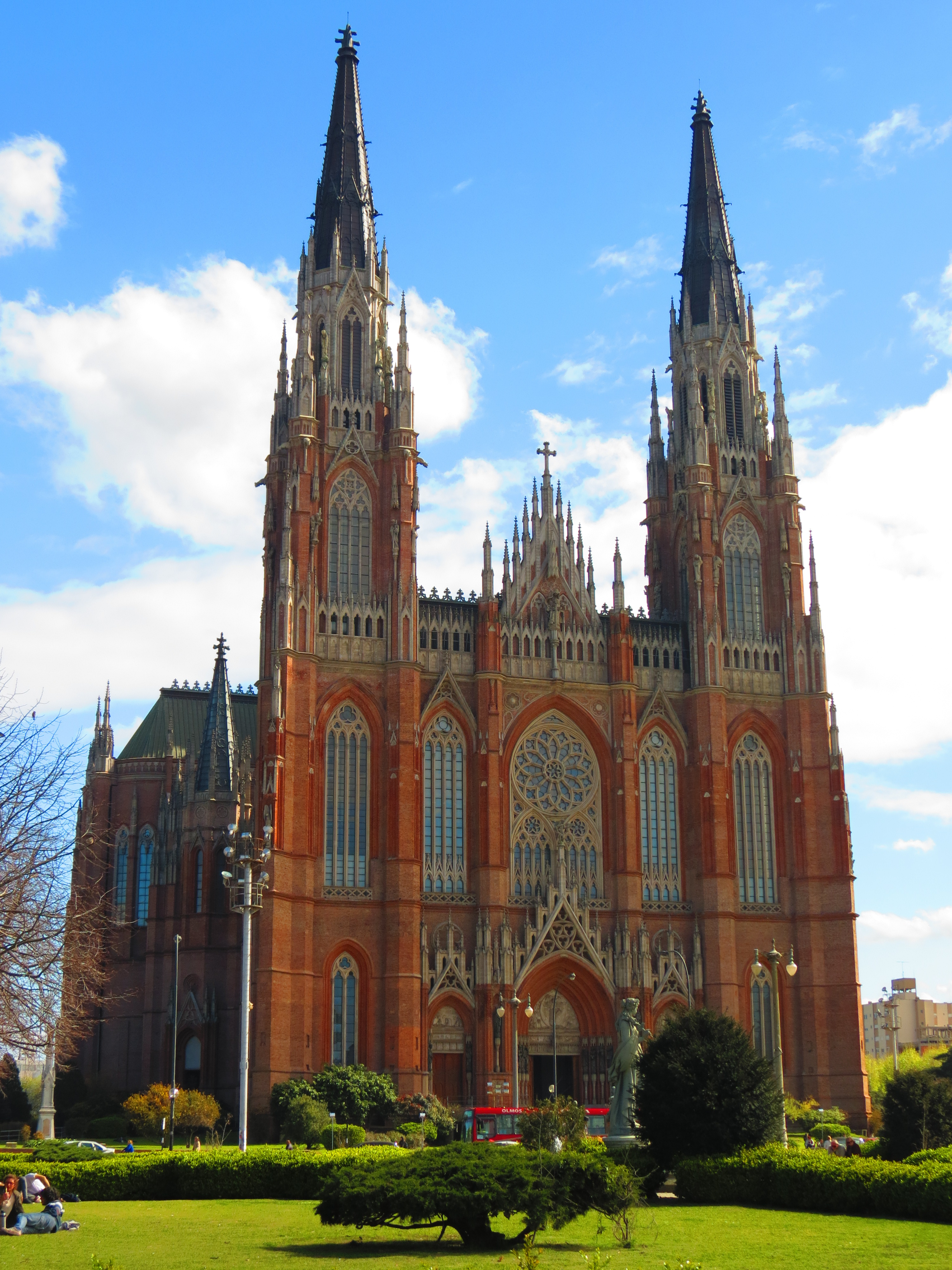
- Cathedral of La Plata
- 34°55′22″S 57°57′22″W
- Location: La Plata, Buenos Aires
- Country: Argentina
- Denomination: Catholic Church
- Sui iuris church: Latin Church
- Website: www.catedraldelaplata.com

History
- Status: Cathedral
- Founded: November 19, 1932
- Dedication: Our Lady of Sorrows

Architecture
- Functional status: Active
- Architect(s): Pedro Benoit, Ernesto Meyer and Emilio Coutaret
- Architectural type: church
- Style: Gothic Revival
- Years built: 1884-1932, 1996-1999
- Groundbreaking: April 30, 1884
- Completed: November 19, 1999

Specifications
- Capacity: 14,000
- Length: 120 m (390 ft)
- Height: 97 m (318 ft)

Administration
- Archdiocese: Archdiocese of La Plata

Clergy
- Archbishop: Héctor Aguer
- Vicar: Javier Fronza

The Cathedral of La Plata or the Cathedral of the Immaculate Conception (Spanish: Catedral de la Inmaculada Concepción) in La Plata, Argentina, dedicated to the Immaculate Conception, is the 58th tallest church in the world. This Neogothic edifice is located in the geographical center of the city, facing the central square, Plaza Moreno, and the City Hall.

Inspired by the European cathedrals of Amiens and Cologne, its plans were drawn by architect Ernesto Meyer under the direction of city planner Pedro Benoit. The cornerstone was laid in 1884, and it was consecrated as the Parroquia Nuestra Señora de los Dolores in 1902. The parish church, which continued undergoing works, was designated a cathedral in 1932.

== History ==
The cathedral was projected by the Engineering Department of the Buenos Aires province headed by engineer Pedro Benoit. The drawings were done by the architect Ernesto Mayer and the architect Emilio Coutaret collaborated with both of them. The design found inspiration in the Amiens Cathedral (France) and the Cologne Cathedral (Germany). Its style belongs to the Gothic Revival architecture (Neo-Gothic).

== Restoration and completion ==
In the 1930s, fearing that the foundation was insufficient for the projected size and weight of the structure, workers halted construction. The spires were left unfinished and the exterior brick work was left undressed. In the mid 1990s, an ambitious plan of restoration and completion was carried out. The 1990s plan included the following:

- Strengthening the foundation.
- Reversing the damage in the bricks and joints.
- Completing two spires, six turrets, 200 pinnacles, and 800 needles.
- Installing a 25-bell carillon.

Once the brickwork was restored and completed, the decision was made to leave the exterior undressed. The building's exposed-brick exterior is thus unusual to some extent, and it makes La Plata Cathedral resemble the brick Gothic or Neogothic style of many churches in northern Europe, such as Uppsala Cathedral in Sweden, St. John's Church, Helsinki in Finland and Roskilde Cathedral in Denmark. The refurbishment was inaugurated to the public in the year 2000.

With its towers rising 367 feet (112 m), it is among the six tallest churches in the Americas.

== Gallery ==
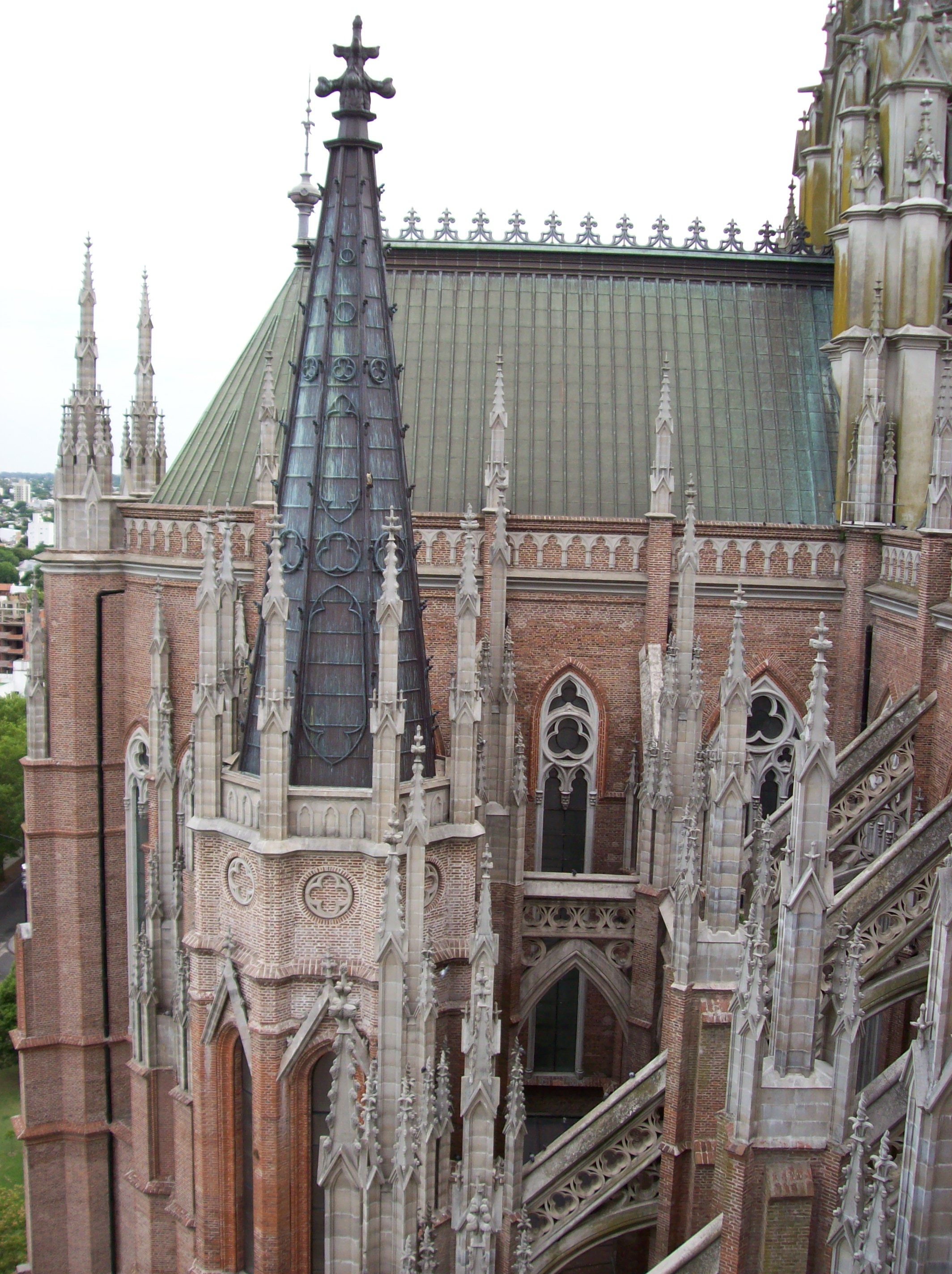
View of the lateral buttressing

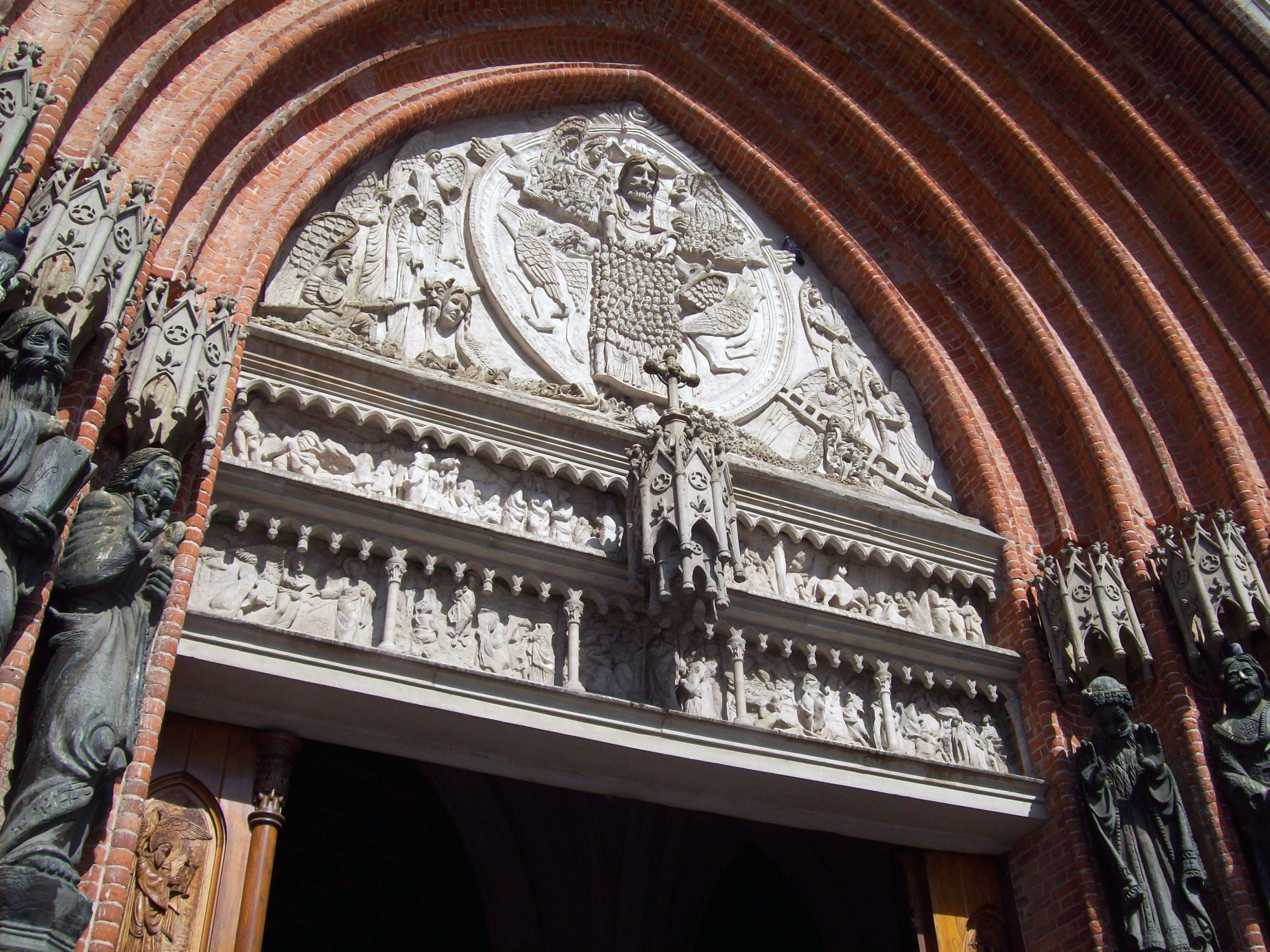
Detail of the ornaments of the main entrance added during the 1998 restoration

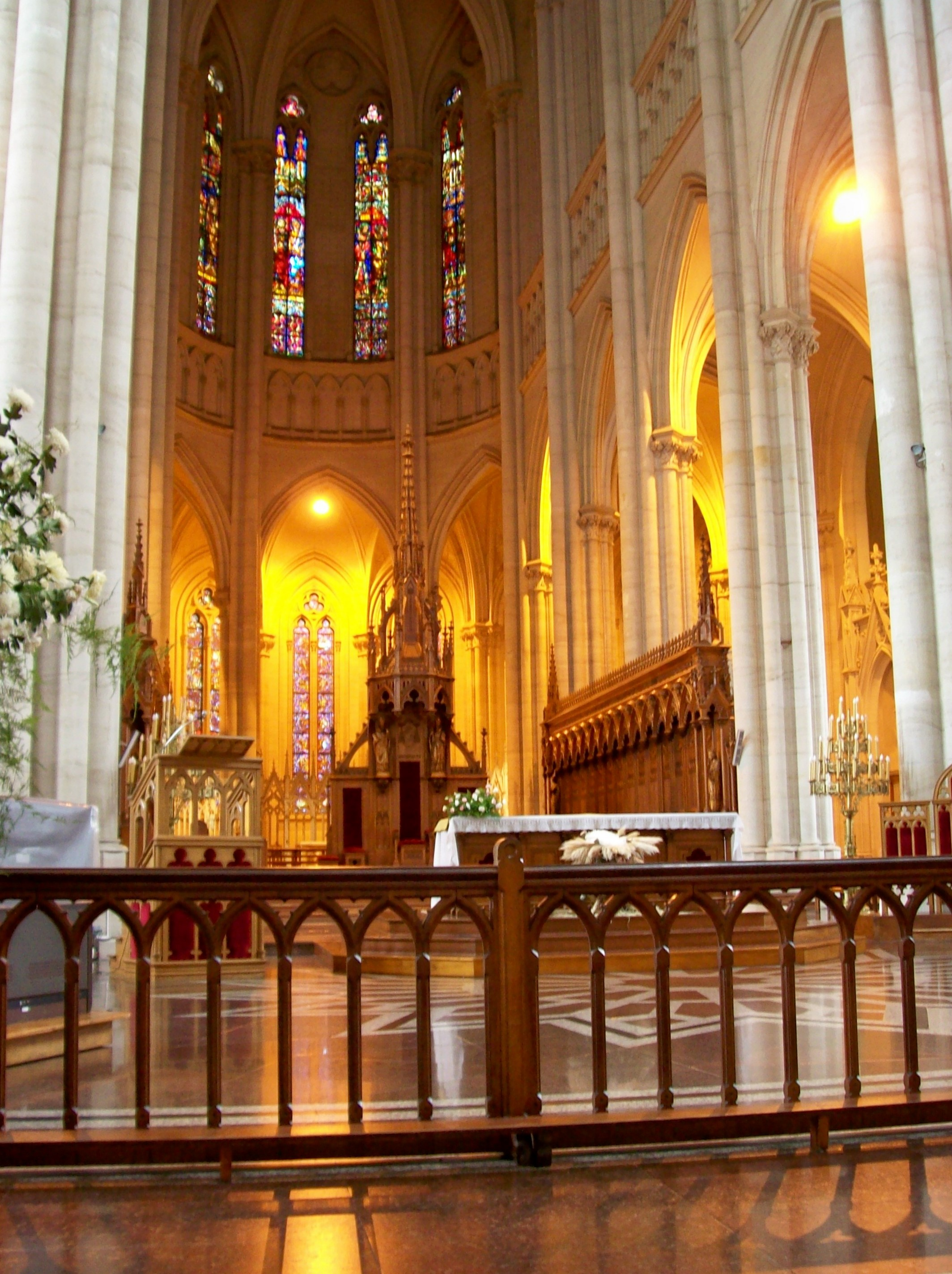
View of the altar

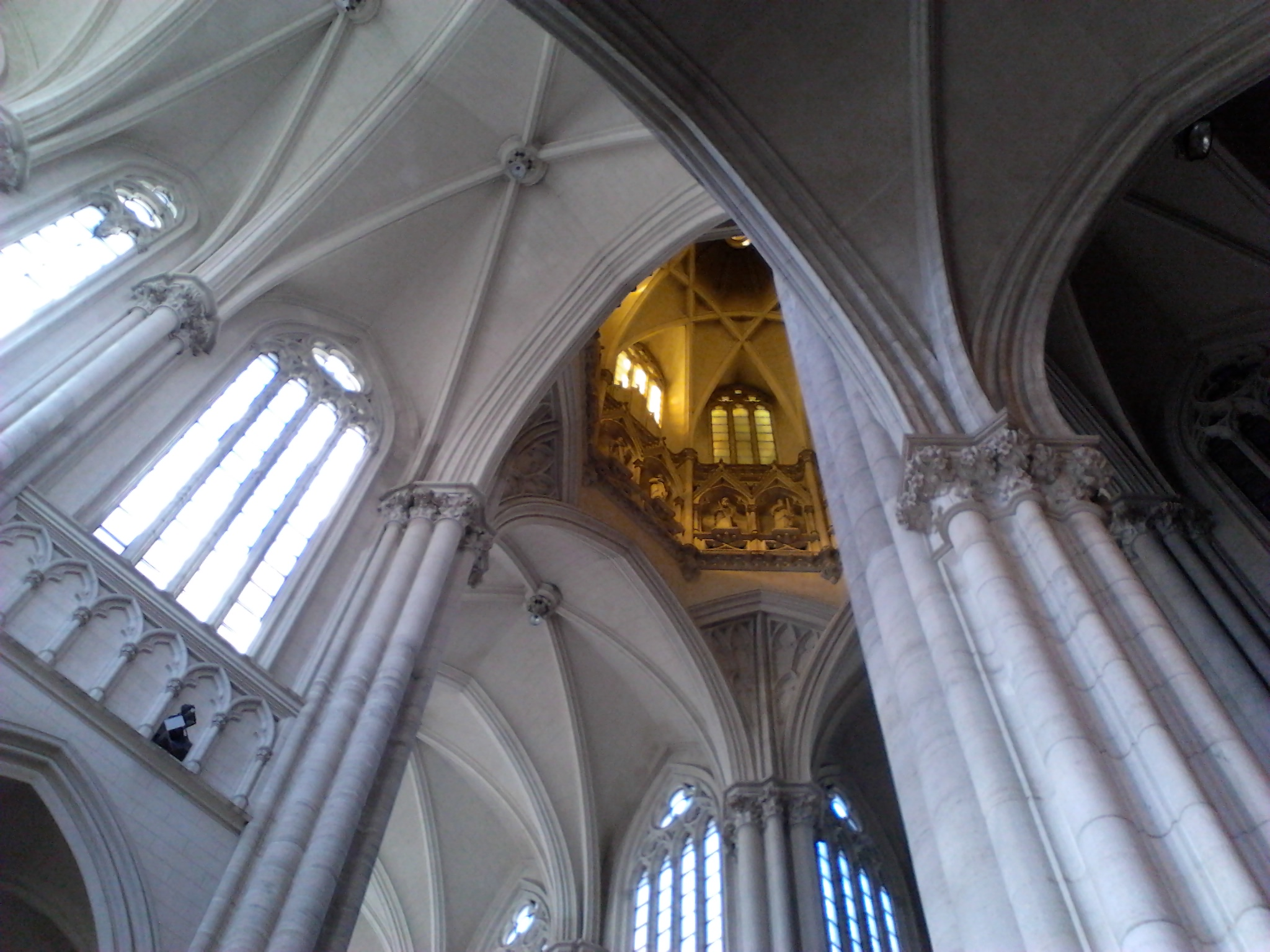
View of the ceiling and central cupola

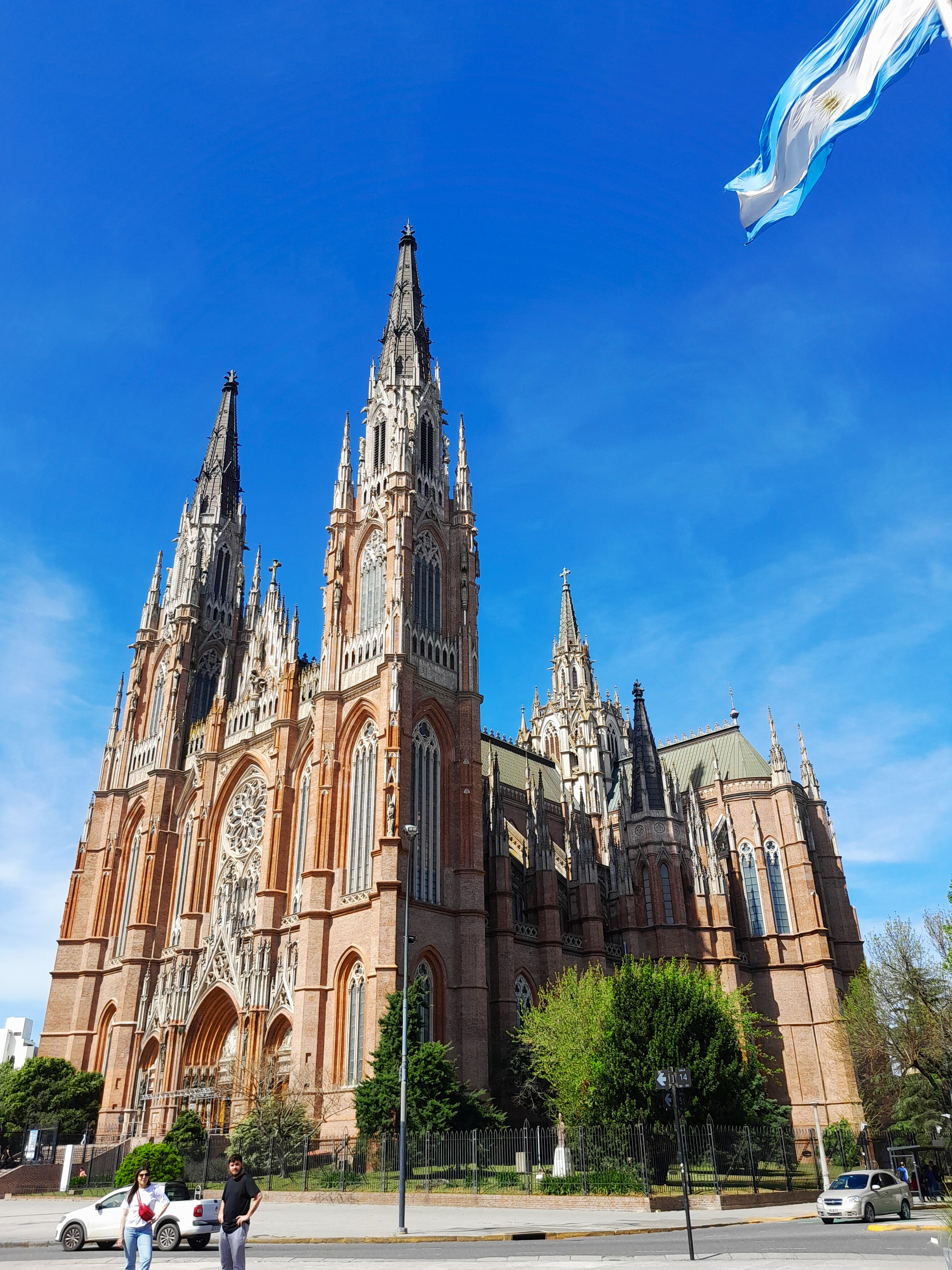
From the view of a pedestrian

== See also ==
- List of highest church naves
- List of tallest churches in the world
- Roman Catholic Archdiocese of La Plata in Argentina
- Plaza Moreno
