= Alejandro Kuropatwa =

Argentine photographer (1956–2003)

- Born: October 22, 1956; Buenos Aires, Argentina
- Died: February 5, 2003 (aged 46)
- Occupation: Photographer

Alejandro Kuropatwa (October 22, 1956 – February 5, 2003) was an Argentine photographer. Born in Buenos Aires to a family of Jewish immigrants, in his youth he studied photography at the Fashion Institute of Technology (New York) between 1979 and 1982. He then went back to Buenos Aires where he developed his career as a professional photographer. During the eighties and nineties, he became famous for his pictures of main Argentine rock stars such as Charly García, Gustavo Cerati and Fito Páez. Due to his festive lifestyle and extravagant personality, he was known as the "Argentine Andy Warhol". Openly gay, Kuropatwa discovered that he had AIDS in 1984. After coming close to death many times, a new generation of anti AIDS drugs stabilized his health and he survived for almost 20 years. In 2002, Kuropatwa won the Konex Award as the most influential Argentine photographer of the nineties. That same year, Kuropatwa exhibited his lifetime of work at the Buenos Aires National Museum of Fine Arts. Kuropatwa died in 2003 due to complications related to AIDS, at the age of 47.
