= Rufino Ortega =

Argentine military man and politician

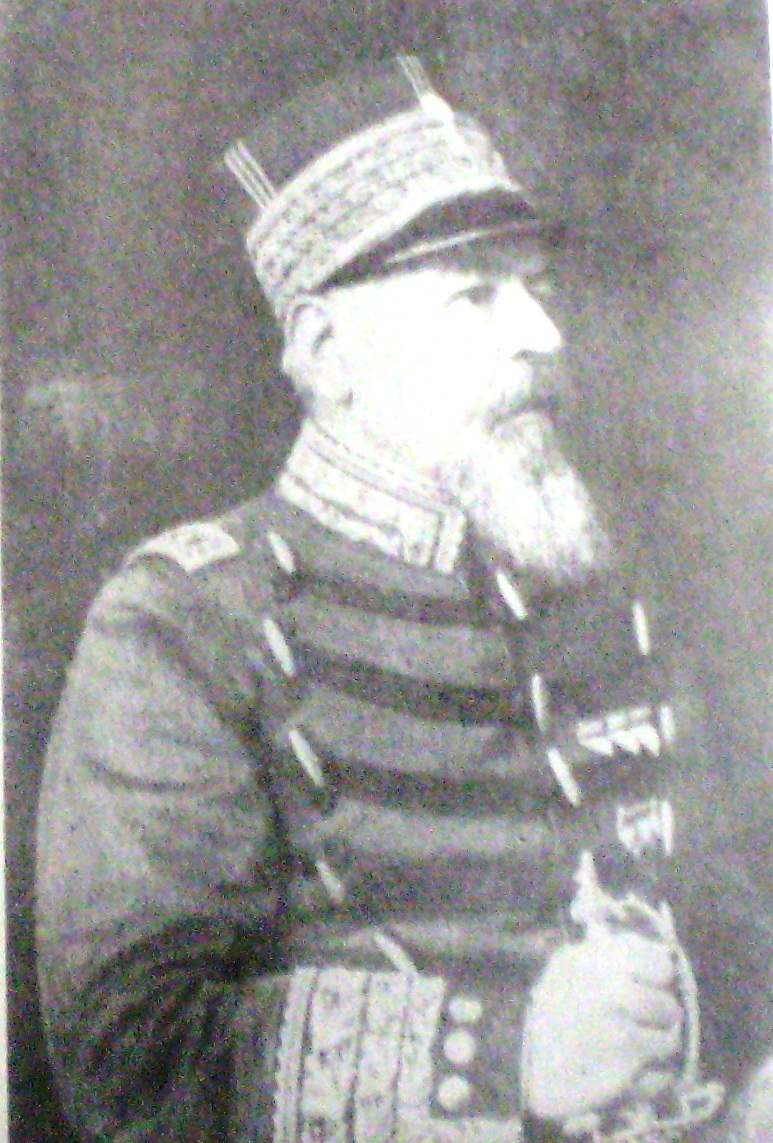
Rufino Ortega

Rufino Ortega (August 22, 1847 – November 20, 1917) was an Argentine military man and politician.

Сommanded the 4th Expeditionary Division under Lieutenant General Julio Argentino Roca. He was governor of the province of Mendoza from 1884 to 1887. He participated in the Battle of Santa Rosa in 1874, where he was severely wounded. Participated in the fighting during the Paraguayan War.
