= Carlos Alfredo D'Amico =

Argentine lawyer, politician and writer

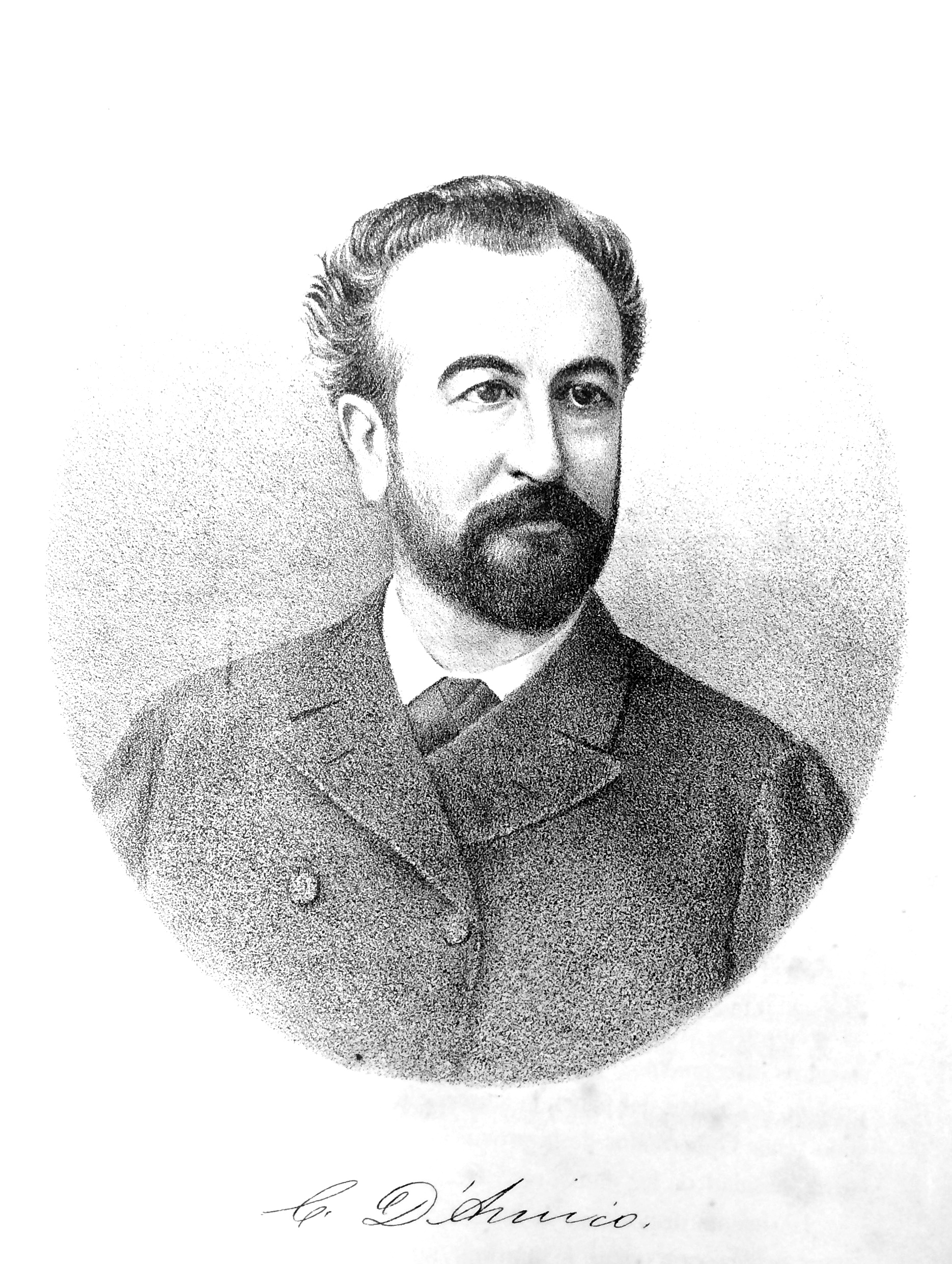
- Born: 23 March 1839; Buenos Aires
- Died: 18 August 1917 (aged 78); Buenos Aires
- Occupation: Lawyer, politician, writer
- Position held: member of the Argentine Chamber of Senators (1883–1884), Governor of Buenos Aires Province

Carlos Alfredo D'Amico (23 March 1839, Buenos Aires – 18 August 1917) was an Argentine lawyer, politician and writer. He is best known for having been governor of Buenos Aires between 1884 and 1887.

== Education and career ==
D'Amico became a lawyer and began his political career in his youth, being a supporter of Adolfo Alsina and contributor to El Nacional. Before becoming governor of the Province of Buenos Aires, he was its minister and national senator representative. He was an active Freemason.

In 1884, he was elected governor, succeeding Dardo Rocha in office with Matias Cardoso being his deputy governor. During his administration he saw the passage of the Provincial Act No. 1810, March 5, 1886, which regulated the activities of municipalities, establishing the creation of a unipersonal Executive Branch overseen by a mayor, and a Deliberative Power composed of councilors who make up the city council. On March 18 of that year, D'Amico regulated that law and decided that he would appoint the mayors of certain municipalities subject to the vote, leaving only the election of councilors. The municipalities whose mayors he appointed were Carmen de Areco, Arrecifes, Rojas, Nueve de Julio, Veinticinco de Mayo and Junin. His term ended in 1887.

He later traveled to Mexico. He returned to Argentina in 1904 and died in Buenos Aires in 1917.
