= Adolfo Gonzales Chaves, Buenos Aires =

Adolfo Gonzales Chaves
- Town
- Location in Argentina
- Coordinates: 38°02′S 60°05′W
- Country: Argentina
- Province: Buenos Aires
- Partido: Adolfo Gonzales Chaves
- Founded: June 20, 1906
- Elevation: 214 m (702 ft)

Population (2001 census [INDEC])
  - Total: 9,437
- CPA Base: B 7513
- Area code: +54 2983
- Climate: Cfb

Adolfo Gonzales Chaves is a town in Buenos Aires Province, Argentina. It is the head town of the Adolfo Gonzales Chaves Partido.

== History ==
- 1886 The opening of the Buenos Aires Great Southern Railway line between Tandil and Tres Arroyos saw the construction of a railway station named "Estación Adolfo Gonzales Chaves".
- June 20, 1906, the settlement was established on land donated by a politician named Adolfo Gonzales Chaves (1828-1887).
- August 19, 1916, the Adolfo Gonzales Chaves Partido was created by Governor Marcelino Ugarte with land from the Juarez, Tres Arroyos and Necochea.
- October 28, 1960, the settlement was officially declared a city.

== Economy ==
The main industry is based in the production of sunflower seeds and other grains.

== Sports ==
In 2008, the 1st FAI South American Gliding Championships took place in Adolfo Gonzales Chaves in conjunction with the 55th National Gliding Championships.

== Notable people ==
- Mario David (1930-2001) - film director and screenwriter
