= Dardo Rocha =

Argentine naval officer, lawyer and politician

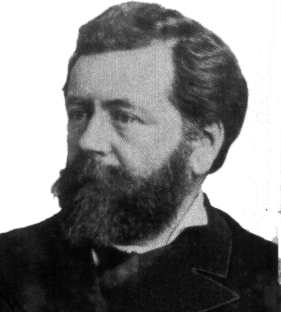

Rector of the University of La Plata
- In office 1897–1905
- Preceded by: post created
- Succeeded by: Joaquín V. González

Governor of Buenos Aires
- In office May 1, 1881 – May 1, 1884
- Preceded by: Juan José Romero
- Succeeded by: Carlos Alfredo D'Amico

Personal details
- Born: September 1, 1838 Buenos Aires
- Died: September 6, 1921 (aged 83) Buenos Aires
- Party: National Autonomist Party
- Spouse: Paula Arana
- Occupation: Lawyer and academic

Dardo Rocha (September 1, 1838 – September 6, 1921) was an Argentine naval officer, lawyer and politician best known as the founder of the city of La Plata and the first president of the University of La Plata.

== Life and times ==
Juan José Dardo Rocha was born to Juana Arana and Colonel Juan José Rocha in Buenos Aires in 1838; his father was a noted opponent of Governor Juan Manuel de Rosas, and fought with Giuseppe Garibaldi and Juan Lavalle against the Buenos Aires strongman. Rocha was invited by his father as a Freemason initiate in 1858, while he studied law at the University of Buenos Aires. He, however, interrupted his studies to enlist as a naval cadet in 1859 and fought in the Battle of Pavón, an 1861 encounter resulting in the unification of the Province of Buenos Aires into the Argentine Republic. He graduated with a law degree in 1863, but remained in the Argentine Navy during the Paraguayan War and was critically wounded during the 1866 Battle of Curupaity. He returned to civilian life as a lawyer and in 1873 married Paula Arana, with whom he had five children.

Invited to take part in the 1870 Constitutional Reform Convention of the province of Buenos Aires, he was elected to the Argentine Chamber of Deputies (the Lower House of Congress) in 1873 and to the Argentine Senate in 1874. He became a leading member in the Senate of Julio Roca's National Autonomist Party, to whose platform the federalization of Buenos Aires was central. A prominent proponent of this policy in Congress, he also earned plaudits for his work to regulate commerce along the contraband-laden Bermejo River bordering Paraguay, for the enactment of the nation's first patent laws, and for his support of protectionism for the nation's small but growing industrial sector.

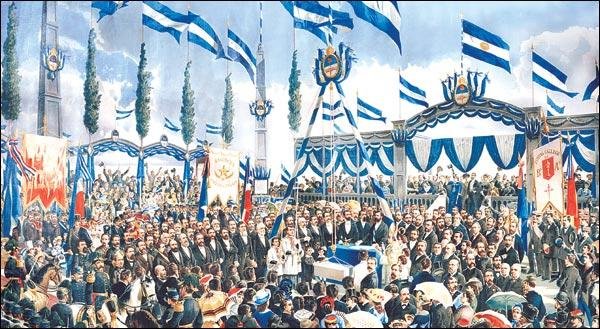
Period illustration of the 1882 placement of La Plata's foundation stone.

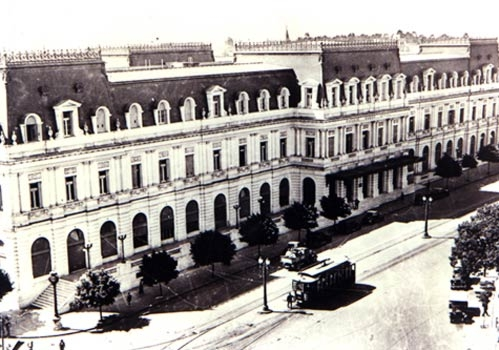
The Dardo Rocha Building, a La Plata landmark named in its founder's honor.

The prominence he earned in the Senate led to his becoming its Provisional President in 1876, whereby he served as acting President of Argentina during the ailing Nicolás Avellaneda's frequent medical leaves of absence. Newly elected in 1880, President Julio Roca supported Rocha's candidacy as Governor of Buenos Aires Province, the nation's most important and most politically contentious at the time. Following a failed insurrection against the Roca regime, his message of political integration with the suddenly prosperous Argentina persuaded the province's voters, and he was elected governor in 1881. Facing ongoing secessionist pressures from his constituency, Governor Rocha proposed the creation of a new provincial capital in replacement of the city of Buenos Aires, which was federalized as the nation's capital in 1880. The proposal, useful to the mollification of the province's independence-leaning gentry, was quickly approved by Congress.

Freemason architect Pedro Benoit was commissioned by Governor Rocha to plan the provincial capital city of La Plata, who created a compass pattern of diagonals and precisely-placed squares. Overseeing a flurry of construction, Rocha inaugurated La Plata on November 19, 1882, establishing the first planned city in South America and its first with electric lighting.

Rocha's success in La Plata and as governor led him to seek his party's nomination for the Presidency in 1886. He was a well-known, well-connected and persuasive candidate who had secured his place among Argentina's paramount Generation of 1880; but lost the nomination to Miguel Juárez Celman, the Governor of the Province of Córdoba and President Roca's son-in-law.

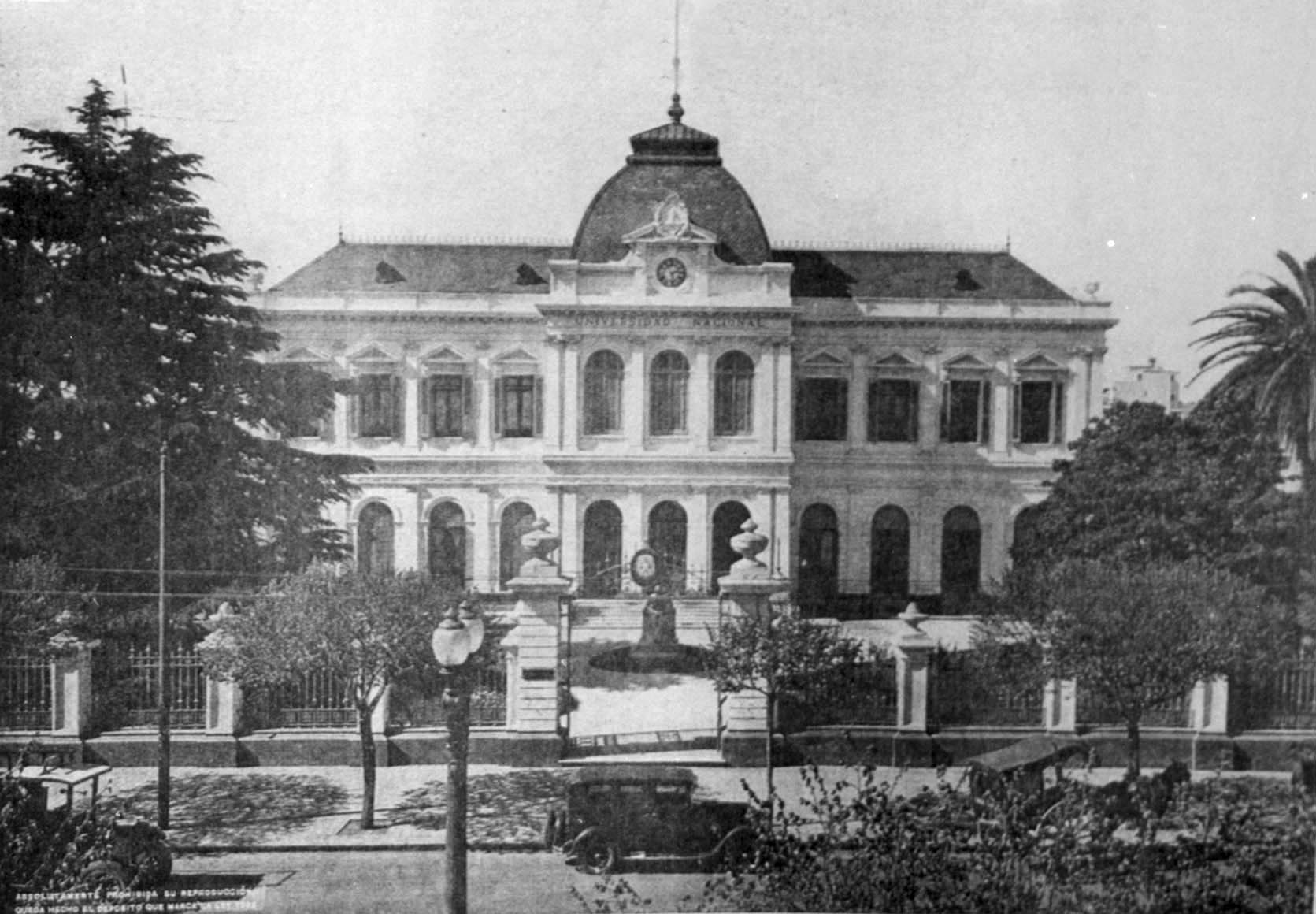
The President's offices at the University of La Plata.

Out of office, Rocha returned to journalistic pursuits, directing the political desk at La Plata's El Nacional until 1889; his colleague at El Nacional, Carlos Alfredo D'Amico, succeeded him as governor. He kept a low political profile following the institutional crisis of 1890 and devoted his time to the growing city he had founded, for which he established the University of La Plata in 1897 and stayed on as its president until the school's nationalization in 1905. His additional responsibilities as Director of the Constitutional Law syllabus at the school did not precluse Rocha from accepting a commission as Argentine observer to the 1904 Bolivia-Chile Border Demarcation Treaty.

Dardo Rocha died in Buenos Aires in 1921 at age 83. His unassuming La Plata home is today maintained as the Dardo Rocha Museum & Archives. Rocha's remains themselves became a subject of controversy. Initially buried in Buenos Aires' La Recoleta Cemetery, these were reinterred in the Cathedral of La Plata a decade later at the request of his eldest son, La Plata Mayor Carlos Rocha. The Roman Catholic Archdiocese of La Plata maintains that such were Dardo Rocha's own wishes. A descendant, Marcos Arana, filed an exhumation request in 2011, however, claiming that Rocha was not a practicing Catholic in life and that, "his remains should be surrounded by nature, rather than in darkness by symbols which are against his beliefs."
