= Francisco Bernabé Madero =

6th Vice President of Argentina

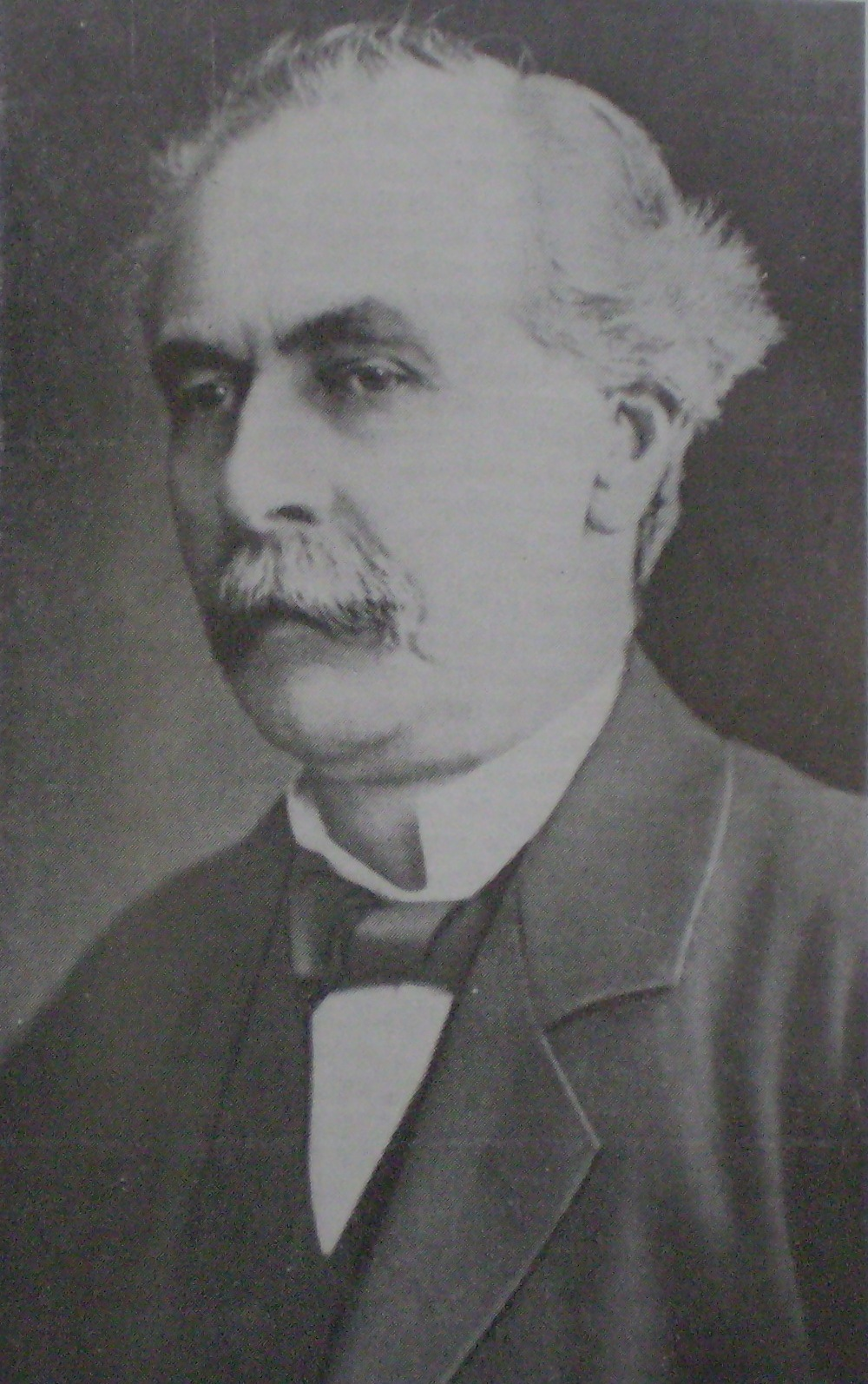

6th Vice President of Argentina
- In office October 12, 1880 – October 12, 1886
- President: Julio Roca
- Preceded by: Mariano Acosta
- Succeeded by: Carlos Pellegrini

Personal details
- Born: October 14, 1816 Buenos Aires
- Died: 1896 (aged 79–80) Buenos Aires
- Party: National Autonomist Party
- Profession: Lawyer

Francisco Bernabé Madero (October 14, 1816 – 1896) was an Argentine lawyer and politician. He served as Vice President of Argentina, and founded the town of Maipú.

== Life and times ==
Madero was born in Buenos Aires to María del Carmen Viana and Juan Bernabé Madero, the latter a Spanish nobleman whose family was originally from Alicante. He became an active Unitarian Party supporter, and joined Francisco Ramos Mexía as a leader of a failed 1839 rebellion against the Unitarians' nemesis, Buenos Aires Governor Juan Manuel de Rosas.

He married a daughter of Ramos Mexía's, Marta, in 1848, and had six children with her. They relocated to Spain after the wedding, but returned to Argentina following Rosas' defeat at the 1852 Battle of Caseros, and dedicated himself to animal husbandry at his wife's Pampas ranch, in rural Monsalvo. He was named Justice of the Peace of Monsalvo in 1857, and was elected to Congress in 1862. Madero retired to his ranch in 1866, though he was elected to the Argentine Senate in 1872. His tenure as Senator was marked by his work in the Economic Policy Committee and his having the newly established hamlet of Maipú recognized as a town.

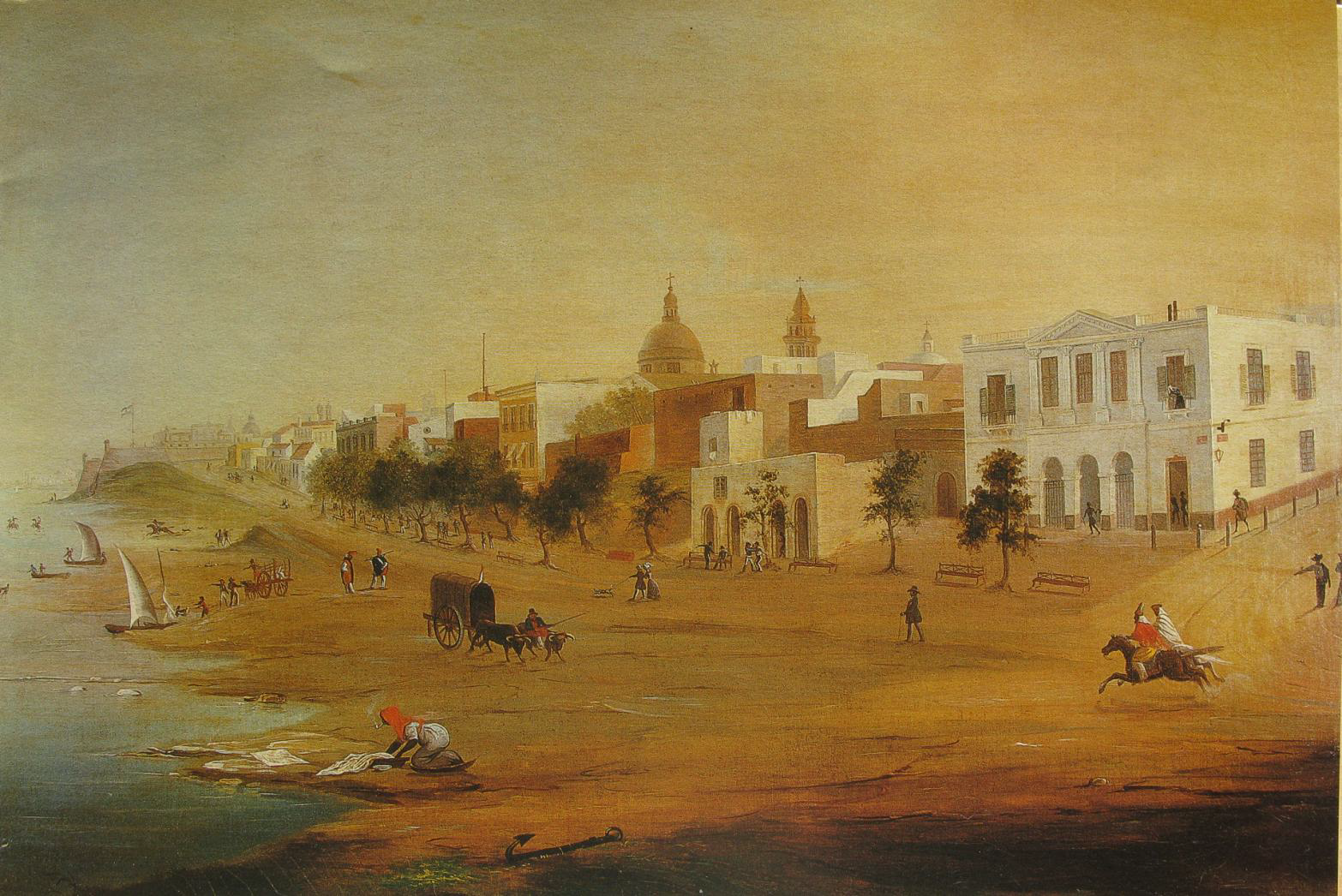
Madero's residence, on Paseo de Julio and Corrientes. (ca.1847)

Little known outside his local area, Madero was named the running mate for the governing National Autonomist Party candidate, Julio Roca. Elected in 1880, Madero built on the relationship he had established with the Western Railway (whose reaching Maipú that year had been the result of his efforts) to encourage their expansion throughout Buenos Aires Province.

Madero retired from public life in 1886, and retired to land owned by his wife in La Matanza County, just west of Buenos Aires. He died in 1896, and the property was later incorporated into the town of Villa Madero in 1901. A nephew of his, Eduardo Madero, obtained British financing to develop what today is known as Puerto Madero, former docklands that in the 1990s became Buenos Aires' newest neighborhood.

Political offices
Preceded by Mariano Acosta	Vice President of Argentina; 1880-1886	Succeeded by Carlos Pellegrini
