= Mario Bravo =

Argentine politician and writer (1882–1944)

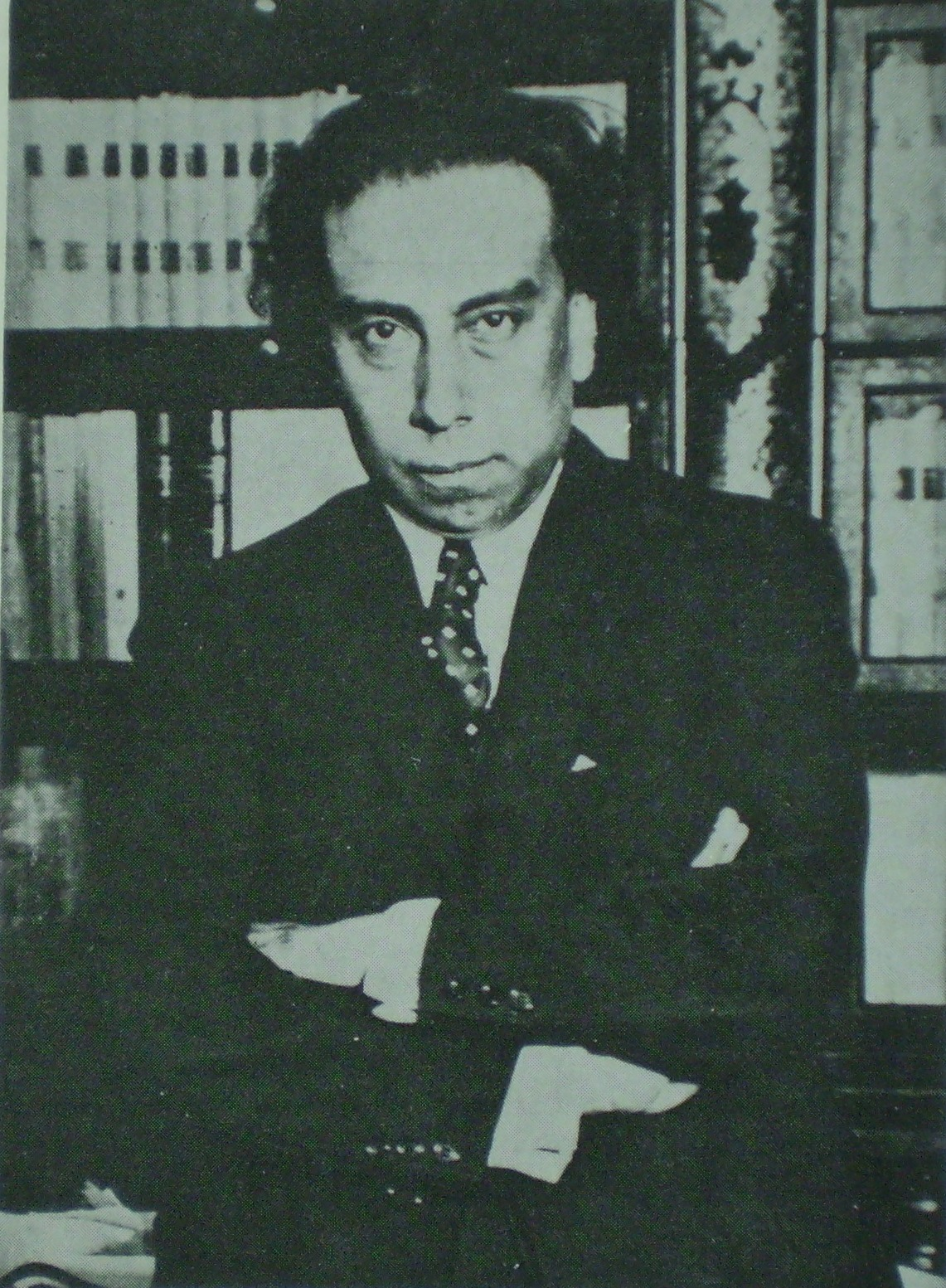
Mario Bravo

Mario Humberto Nicolás Bravo (June 27, 1882 – March 17, 1944) was an Argentine politician and writer.

== Life and times ==
Born in La Cocha, Tucumán Province, in 1882, Bravo enrolled at the University of Buenos Aires, and earned a Law Degree in 1905 after submitting his thesis on labor legislation. He joined the Socialist Party while a student, and in 1907, was named editor-in-chief of La Vanguardia, one of the best-known socialist publications in Argentina, at the time. He also published numerous works of prose, poetry, and non-fiction, from 1909 onwards.

Following Socialists' surprise victory in a 1913 Buenos Aires Senate seat race, Bravo was named second on the Socialist party list for the City of Buenos Aires delegation to the Lower House of Congress, and in 1914, was elected to Congress with cooperative movement leader Nicolás Repetto and four others from the party. He was re-elected to Congress in 1918, and in 1923, was elected to the Senate. A member of a minority party in a Congress dominated by the rivalry between the centrist UCR and conservatives, Bravo introduced numerous pieces of legislation, particularly bills advancing labor law reforms and women's rights. He continued to write while in Congress, publishing poetry as well as political works.

The Socialists entered a crisis ahead of the 1928 elections, when, during their 1927 convention, their party standard-bearer, Senator Juan B. Justo, selected former University of La Plata Director José Nicolás Matienzo as his running mate. Justo died suddenly in January 1928, however, leaving Matienzo as the nominee. Viewed by Bravo's supporters as too conservative, the Matienzo pick led to a schism in which the latter ran for President on an Independent Socialist ticket, and Bravo ran on the official one. Matienzo, who received the support of much of the press, garnered far fewer votes; whereas Bravo, who staked his campaign on support from Buenos Aires, received no votes in the electoral college; however, Matienzo received 3 as a result of support from San Juan Governor Federico Cantoni. The election resulted in a debacle for the Socialists, who were distantly outpolled by both UCR leader Hipólito Yrigoyen, as well as by conservatives.

Following the 1930 overthrow of President Hipólito Yrigoyen, Bravo negotiated a Civil Alliance between the Socialist Party and the PDP of the more conservative reformist, Lisandro de la Torre, in 1931. The Alliance became the leading party in opposition to the ruling Concordance following the deportation of UCR leader Marcelo Torcuato de Alvear; massive voter fraud contributed to Alliance's defeat in the 1931 elections, however.

Returned to the Senate by voters in 1932 (following Congress' suspension by a coup d'état against President Yrigoyen in 1930), Bravo became known for his work on arms control legislation. He was defeated in 1939, however, and resumed his post as editor-in-chief of La Vanguardia, as well as of the news and commentary weekly Argentina Libre.

Elections in 1942 returned Bravo to public office, and he served as Congressman from Buenos Aires. His health had deteriorated, however, and he shortly afterwards donated his extensive library to the University of Tucumán. Mario Bravo died in 1944, at age 61.

== Bibliography ==
- Poemas del campo y de la montaña (Poems from the Land and the Mountains, 1909)
- La huelga de mayo (The May Strike, 1909)
- Movimiento socialista y obrero (The Socialist Workers' Movement, 1910)
- Canciones y poemas (Songs and Poems, 1918), poetry
- Canciones de la soledad (Songs of Solitude, 1920), poetry
- Cuentos para los pobres (Tales for the Poor, 1923), short stories
- Capítulos de la legislación obrera (Chapters in Labor Law, 1925)
- Sociedades Cooperativas (Cooperatives, 1926)
- Derechos civiles de la mujer (A Woman's Civil Rights, 1927)
- En el surco (In the Groove, 1929), novel
- La Revolución de ellos (Their Revolution, 1932)
