= 1931 Argentine general election =

- Presidential election
- 8 November 1931

376 members of the Electoral College 189 votes needed to win
- Registered: 2,116,552
- Turnout: 73.80%
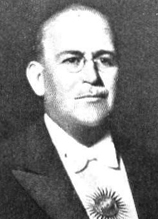

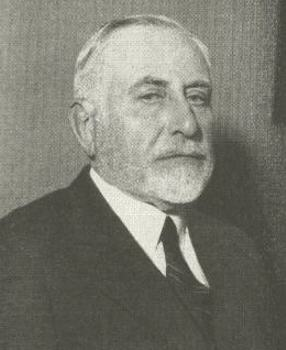
| Nominee | Agustín P. Justo | Lisandro de la Torre |
| Party | UCRA | PDP |
| Alliance | Concordancia | Civil Alliance |
| Running mate | Julio Roca/; José Matienzo | Nicolás Repetto |
| Electoral vote | 237 | 124 |
| Popular vote | 864,394 | 487,584 |
| Percentage | 61.44% | 34.66% |
- Results by province
President before election
José F. Uriburu
ALN
Elected President
Agustín P. Justo
PDN
- Chamber of Deputies
- 8 November 1931
- All 158 seats in the Chamber of Deputies; 80 seats needed for a majority
- Turnout: 73.81%
| Party | Vote % | Seats |
Chamber of Deputies
| Concordancia | 60.05 | 95 |
| Civil Alliance | 34.25 | 57 |
| Entre Ríos UCRA | 3.28 | 6 |
This lists parties that won seats. See the complete results below.
Results by province

General elections were held in Argentina 8 November 1931.

== Background ==
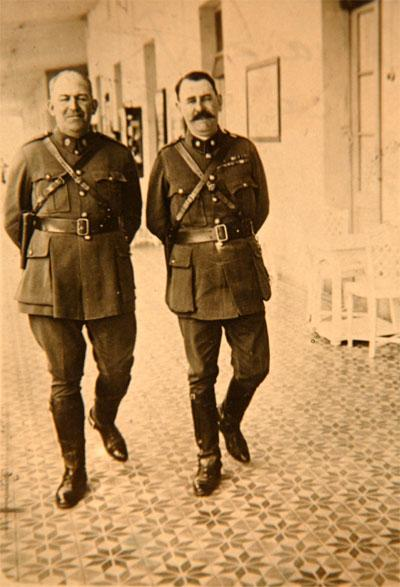
Concordance candidate Agustín Justo (left) and his benefactor, dictator José Félix Uriburu.

Following months of protest triggered in part by the onset of the Great Depression, a quiet coup d'état deposed the aging Hipólito Yrigoyen in September 1930. His country's first leader elected via secret male universal suffrage, Yrigoyen had strained alliances within his own centrist Radical Civic Union (UCR) through frequent interventions against willful governors and had set business powerhouses such as Standard Oil against him through his support of YPF, the state oil concern founded in 1922. Staging its first coup since 1861, the Argentine military, then dominated by conservative, rural interests, called on José Félix Uriburu, a retired general and member of the Supreme War Council, to assume the role of Provisional President. Uriburu, the nephew of former President José Evaristo Uriburu, had no taste for politics and was in ailing health.

He nevertheless set down an ambitious agenda, entrusting his Interior Minister, Matías Sánchez Sorondo, to replace the 1912 Sáenz Peña Law (which provided for universal male suffrage and the secret ballot) with one promoting a single, ruling party not unlike the one that kept the landowner-oriented National Autonomist Party (PAN) in power from 1874 to 1916. Aligning themselves behind the relatively moderate National Democratic Party, conservatives were defeated in gubernatorial polls in the paramount Province of Buenos Aires in April 1931. The results not only raised hopes for the centrist, urban-oriented UCR, it also persuaded Uriburu that Sánchez Sorondo's "electoral reform" would not keep conservatives in power, in and of itself.

The UCR turned to Marcelo Torcuato de Alvear for leadership ahead of the November 1931 elections. The scion of one of Argentina's traditional landed families and President from 1922 to 1928, Alvear's alliance with Yrigoyen soured as he challenged the latter's personality cult (hence his creation of a splinter, "Antipersonalist" UCR). The seasoned Alvear, however, took care to assuage the still-popular Yrigoyen's objections by naming former Salta Province Governor Adolfo Güemes (a staunch Yrigoyen supporter) as his running mate.

Facing a recovered and nearly-unified UCR, President Uriburu dispensed with his previous pledge to restore constitutional order and annulled the Buenos Aires Province elections. He also promoted the Argentine Civic Legion, an armed fascist organization entrusted to intimidate the opposition. Alvear's establishment of a Renewal Junta helped lead to a violent July 20 clash with Uriburu's forces in Corrientes Province, which gave the President the pretext for ordering Alvear's deportation, a few days later. Deprived of their candidate, the UCR boycotted the 1931 election, though party committees in a number of provinces participated in the November polls.

The support of UCR Senator Leopoldo Melo (the leader of the anti-Yrigoyen faction of the party) and Uriburu for retired General Agustín Justo as candidate resulted in the Concordance. This new, conservative alliance heeded Uriburu's sage advice during their nominating convention, sidestepping imposing landowners in favor of Justo, who had been President Alvear's War Minister in the 1920s. They picked former Córdoba Governor Julio Roca as his running mate; Roca, the son of the late PAN leader, Julio A. Roca, had led the Democratic Party of Córdoba.

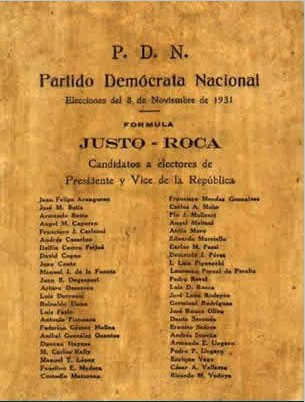
A National Democratic Party ballot.

The Democratic Progressive Party (PDP), known for its anti-corruption platform, nominated Senator Lisandro de la Torre, who also earned the endorsement of the Socialist Party of Argentina, a party in search of leadership following the passing of Juan B. Justo, in 1928. The alliance alienated conservatives in the PDP, however, who instead endorsed the aging Francisco A. Barroetaveña, a former Senator who ran on a UCR ticket limited to his Entre Ríos Province. Barroetaveña, who helped found the UCR in 1890, broke with Yrigoyen during the 1920s and hoped to rally the exiled Alvear's supporters behind him.

Ultimately, voter intimidation and widespread irregularities helped give the National Democratic-led Concordance a sizable victory on election night. The electoral college, however, which counted the conservatives' ad hoc Lista Única (Unified List) separately, was far more closely divided: 135 for Justo, 124 for de la Torre, and 117 for the numerous UCR tickets who defied Alvear's boycott (including Barroetaveña's). As most of these splinter UCR tickets were led by conservative figures opposed to the muck-raking Senator de la Torre, their pledge of most of their 117 electors handed Justo the Presidency.

== Candidates ==
- Concordance (conservative): General Agustín Justo of Entre Ríos Province
- Socialist-Democratic Progressive alliance (reformist): Former Deputy Lisandro de la Torre of the city of Buenos Aires
- Radical Civic Union (unofficial, center-right ticket): Former Deputy Francisco A. Barroetaveña of Entre Ríos Province
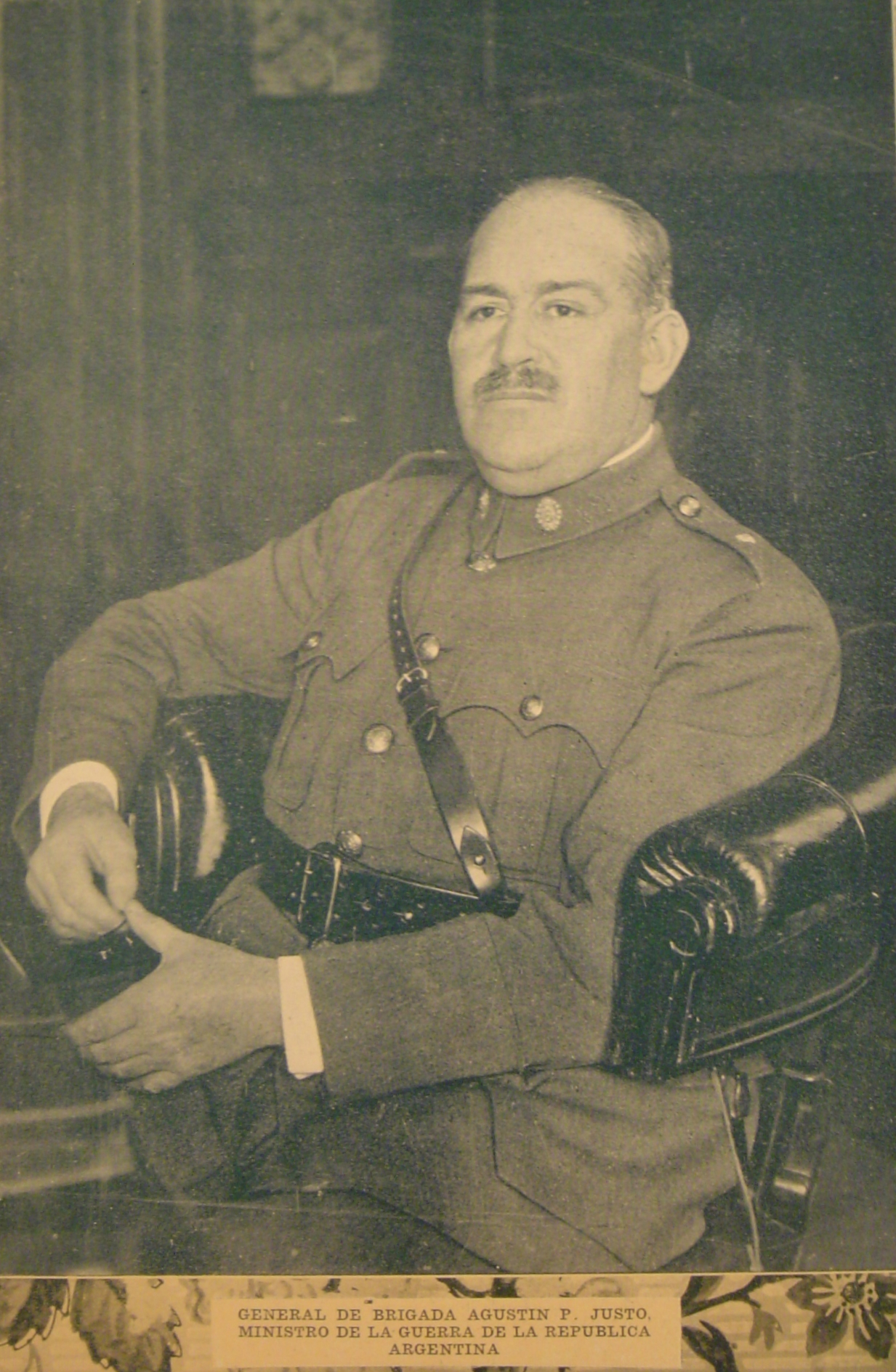
Justo

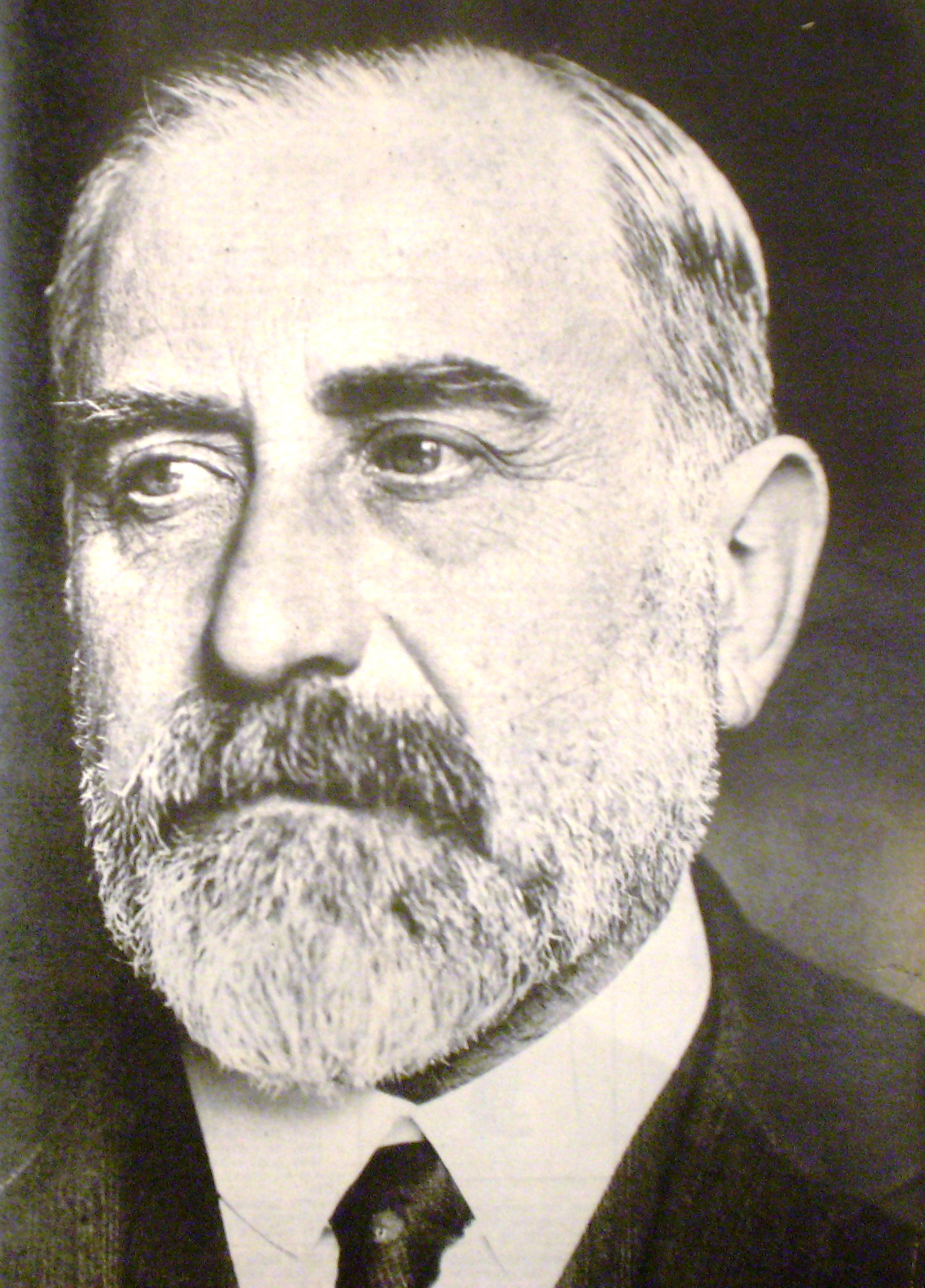
de la Torre

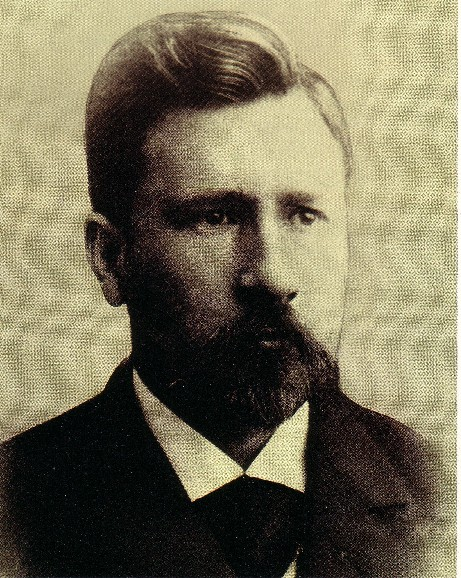
Barroetaveña

== Results ==
=== President ===
| Candidate | Running mate | Party or alliance | | Public vote | | Electoral vote | |
| Candidate | Running mate | Party or alliance | | Votes | % | Votes | % |
|---|---|---|---|---|---|---|---|
| Agustín Pedro Justo | Julio Argentino Pascual Roca | Concordancia | National Democratic Party | 508,271 | 36.13 | 157 | 44.10 |
| Agustín Pedro Justo | Julio Argentino Pascual Roca | Concordancia | Unified List | 126,392 | 8.98 | 2 | 0.56 |
| Agustín Pedro Justo | Julio Argentino Pascual Roca | Concordancia | PDN–Pactist Liberal–UCRA | 28,835 | 2.05 | 12 | 3.37 |
| Agustín Pedro Justo | Julio Argentino Pascual Roca | Concordancia | People's Party | 9,246 | 0.66 | 6 | 1.69 |
| Agustín Pedro Justo | Julio Argentino Pascual Roca | Concordancia | Total | 672,744 | 47.82 | 197 | 55.34 |
| Lisandro de la Torre | Nicolás Repetto | Civil Alliance (PDP–PS) | | 487,584 | 34.66 | 124 | 34.83 |
| Agustín Pedro Justo | José Nicolás Matienzo | Concordancia | Antipersonalist Radical Civic Union | 50,801 | 3.61 | 7 | 1.97 |
| Agustín Pedro Justo | José Nicolás Matienzo | Concordancia | Independent Socialist Party | 37,788 | 2.69 | 3 | 0.84 |
| Agustín Pedro Justo | José Nicolás Matienzo | Concordancia | Unified Radical Civic Union | 28,343 | 2.01 | 11 | 3.09 |
| Agustín Pedro Justo | José Nicolás Matienzo | Concordancia | Liberal Party of Corrientes | 27,139 | 1.93 | 6 | 1.69 |
| Agustín Pedro Justo | José Nicolás Matienzo | Concordancia | Provincial Defence–White Flag | 22,195 | 1.58 | 6 | 1.69 |
| Agustín Pedro Justo | José Nicolás Matienzo | Concordancia | Blockist Radical Civic Union | 20,910 | 1.49 | 7 | 1.97 |
| Agustín Pedro Justo | José Nicolás Matienzo | Concordancia | UCRA–PSI | 2,498 | 0.18 | | |
| Agustín Pedro Justo | José Nicolás Matienzo | Concordancia | Liberal Party of San Juan | 1,976 | 0.14 | | |
| Agustín Pedro Justo | José Nicolás Matienzo | Concordancia | Total | 191,650 | 13.62 | 40 | 11.24 |
| Francisco A. Barroetaveña | José Nicolás Matienzo | Independent Radical Civic Union | | 41,474 | 2.95 | 15 | 4.21 |
| Genaro Giacobini | Héctor González | Public Health Party | | 4,507 | 0.32 | | |
| No candidate | No candidate | National Agrarian Union | | 4,223 | 0.30 | | |
| No candidate | No candidate | Reform Party | | 4,163 | 0.30 | | |
| No candidate | No candidate | Dissident Liberal Party of Córdoba | | 532 | 0.04 | | |
| Total | | | | 1,406,877 | 100.00 | 356 | 100.00 |
| Valid votes | | | | 1,406,877 | 90.07 | | |
| Invalid/blank votes | | | | 155,156 | 9.93 | | |
| Total votes | | | | 1,562,033 | 100.00 | | |
| Registered voters/turnout | | | | 2,116,552 | 73.80 | | |
Source: Cantón, Minitry of the Interior, Chamber of Deputies

=== Chamber of Deputies ===
| Party or alliance | | Votes | % | Seats | | |
| Party or alliance | | Votes | % | 1932–34 | 1932–36 | Total |
|---|---|---|---|---|---|---|
| Concordancia | National Democratic Party | 479,087 | 34.93 | 27 | 31 | 58 |
| Concordancia | Independent Socialist Party | 96,544 | 7.04 | 6 | 5 | 11 |
| Concordancia | Santa Fe Radical Civic Union | 80,822 | 5.89 | 3 | 3 | 6 |
| Concordancia | Antipersonalist Radical Civic Union | 46,905 | 3.42 | 5 | 0 | 5 |
| Concordancia | Unified Radical Civic Union | 29,941 | 2.18 | 2 | 2 | 4 |
| Concordancia | Liberal Party of Corrientes | 28,522 | 2.08 | 2 | 3 | 5 |
| Concordancia | Provincial Defence–White Flag | 24,797 | 1.81 | 1 | 1 | 2 |
| Concordancia | Blockist Radical Civic Union | 20,330 | 1.48 | 2 | 0 | 2 |
| Concordancia | People's Party | 11,414 | 0.83 | 2 | 0 | 2 |
| Concordancia | UCRA–PSI | 3,107 | 0.23 | 0 | 0 | 0 |
| Concordancia | Liberal Party of San Juan | 2,193 | 0.16 | 0 | 0 | 0 |
| Concordancia | Total | 823,662 | 60.05 | 50 | 45 | 95 |
| Civic Alliance | Socialist Party | 360,813 | 26.30 | 20 | 22 | 42 |
| Civic Alliance | Democratic Progressive Party | 99,603 | 7.26 | 6 | 7 | 13 |
| Civic Alliance | Civic Alliance | 9,402 | 0.69 | 1 | 1 | 2 |
| Civic Alliance | Total | 469,818 | 34.25 | 27 | 30 | 57 |
| Entre Ríos Antipersonalist Radical Civic Union | | 44,982 | 3.28 | 2 | 4 | 6 |
| Agrarian Party | | 14,670 | 1.07 | 0 | 0 | 0 |
| Reform Party | | 9,098 | 0.66 | 0 | 0 | 0 |
| Public Health Party | | 5,424 | 0.40 | 0 | 0 | 0 |
| Dissident Democratic Party of San Luis | | 2,121 | 0.15 | 0 | 0 | 0 |
| Labour Gathering Party | | 1,051 | 0.08 | 0 | 0 | 0 |
| Republican Gathering | | 856 | 0.06 | 0 | 0 | 0 |
| Total | | 1,371,682 | 100.00 | 79 | 79 | 158 |
| Valid votes | | 1,371,682 | 87.81 | | | |
| Invalid/blank votes | | 190,460 | 12.19 | | | |
| Total votes | | 1,562,142 | 100.00 | | | |
| Registered voters/turnout | | 2,116,552 | 73.81 | | | |
Source: Cantón, El Orden, Diario Santa Fe, El Litoral

==== Results by province ====
| Province | Concordance | | | Civic Alliance | | | Others | | |
| Province | Votes | % | Seats | Votes | % | Seats | Votes | % | Seats |
|---|---|---|---|---|---|---|---|---|---|
| Buenos Aires | 229,248 | 64.19 | 28 | 123,272 | 34.52 | 14 | 4,602 | 1.29 | 0 |
| Buenos Aires City | 90,874 | 33.18 | 10 | 171,545 | 62.63 | 22 | 11,494 | 4.20 | 0 |
| Catamarca | 19,444 | 100 | 2 | — | — | — | — | — | — |
| Córdoba | 97,333 | 80.34 | 10 | 19,421 | 16.03 | 5 | 4,400 | 3.63 | 0 |
| Corrientes | 54,661 | 93.82 | 7 | 3,598 | 6.18 | 0 | — | — | — |
| Entre Ríos | 31,303 | 35.18 | 3 | 12,704 | 14.28 | 0 | 44,982 | 50.55 | 6 |
| Jujuy | 11,414 | 81.88 | 2 | 2,526 | 18.12 | 0 | — | — | — |
| La Rioja | 13,535 | 89.75 | 2 | 1,546 | 10.25 | 0 | — | — | — |
| Mendoza | 29,064 | 75.56 | 4 | 9,402 | 24.44 | 2 | — | — | — |
| Salta | 22,316 | 85.68 | 3 | 3,729 | 14.32 | 0 | — | — | — |
| San Juan | 29,489 | 87.64 | 3 | 4,159 | 12.36 | 0 | — | — | — |
| San Luis | 12,154 | 69.84 | 2 | 3,128 | 17.97 | 1 | 2,121 | 12.19 | 0 |
| Santa Fe | 80,822 | 43.43 | 6 | 99,603 | 53.52 | 13 | 5,668 | 3.05 | 0 |
| Santiago del Estero | 51,823 | 86.37 | 6 | 3,241 | 5.40 | 0 | 4,935 | 8.23 | 0 |
| Tucumán | 50,182 | 80.77 | 7 | 11,944 | 19.23 | 0 | — | — | — |
| Total | 823,662 | 60.05 | 95 | 469,818 | 34.25 | 57 | 78,202 | 5.70 | 6 |
