= 1928 Argentine general election =

- 1 April 1928
- Presidential election

376 members of the Electoral College 189 votes needed to win
- Registered: 1,807,566
- Turnout: 80.86%
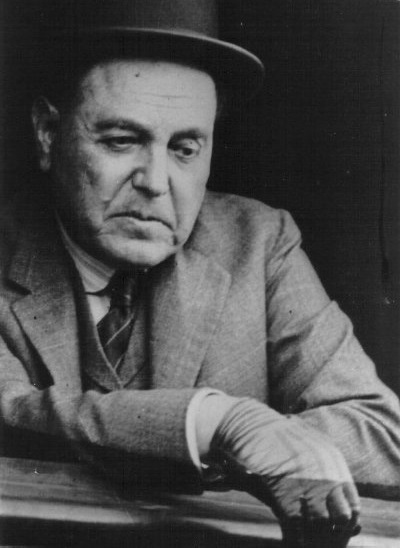

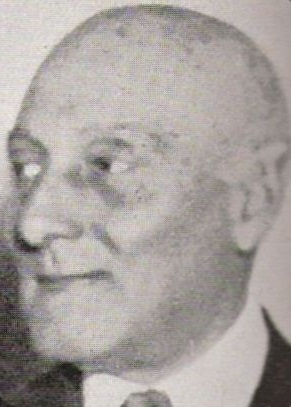
Nominee	Hipólito Yrigoyen	Leopoldo Melo
Party	UCR	Confederation
Running mate	Francisco Beiró	Vicente Gallo
Electoral vote	249	124
Popular vote	839,140	470,050
Percentage	61.42%	34.48%
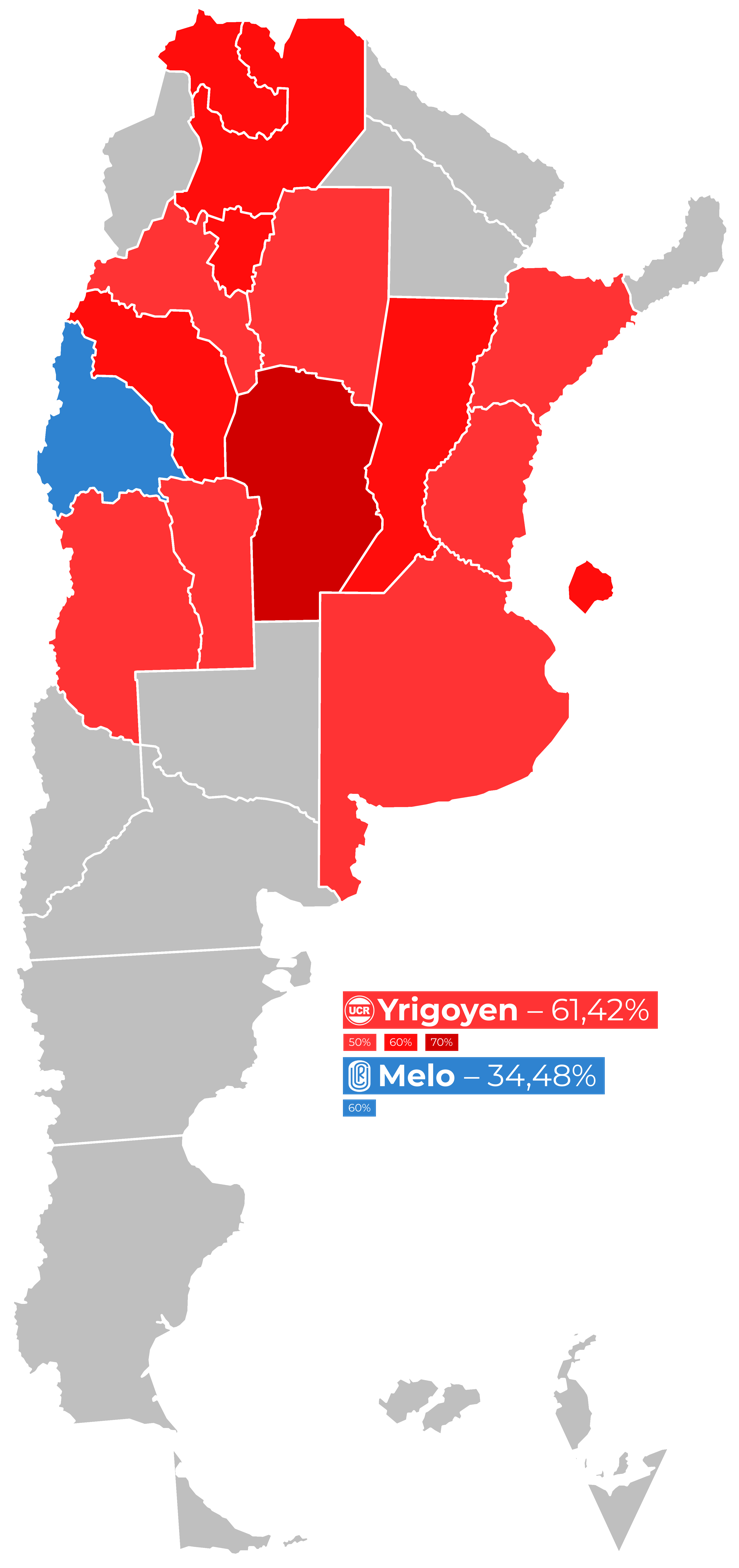
- Results by province
President before election
Marcelo T. de Alvear
UCR
Elected President
Hipólito Yrigoyen
UCR
- Chamber of Deputies
- 80 of the 158 seats in the Chamber of Deputies
- Turnout: 83.12%
Party	Vote %	Seats	+/–
Radical Civic Union	56.92	53	+39
Confederation of the Right	29.06	21	−17
Independent Socialist Party	3.89	6	New
This lists parties that won seats. See the complete results below.
Results by province

General elections were held in Argentina on 1 April 1928. Hipólito Yrigoyen of the Radical Civic Union (UCR) was elected president, with the UCR also gaining a majority of seats in the Chamber of Deputies. Voter turnout was 81%.

== Background ==
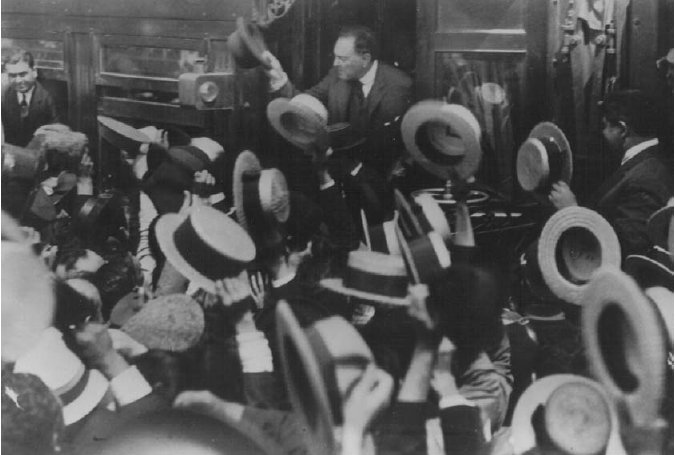
Former President Hipólito Yrigoyen works the crowd in a 1926 rally. Nostalgia for the charismatic populist brought UCR voters back into his fold in 1928.

Former President Hipólito Yrigoyen's differences with his successor and erstwhile ally, Marcelo Torcuato de Alvear, persuaded him to campaign for the presidency again. Doing so meant overcoming a host of obstacles, however: his "Antipersonalist" opposition within the UCR, though divided, eroded his allies' majority in Congress from 91 seats (out of 158) to 72 in 1924 and 60 in 1926, and he himself was 78 and in declining health.

These developments encouraged not only the Antipersonalists, but also conservatives, who united behind Julio A. Roca's Rightist Confederation. The Governor of the important Córdoba Province, Roca was the son of General Julio Roca, who had dominated the country politically between 1880 and 1906 and, in the minds of their supporters, recalled a certain nostalgia for the pastoral Argentina of the time. President Alvear's Antipersonalist UCR nominated the leader of the 1924 dissension that created the movement, Senator Leopoldo Melo. Melo underscored the conservative bent of his campaign by naming Senator Vicente Gallo as his running mate; Gallo was a founding member of the paramilitary Argentine Patriotic League, and had resigned as President Alvear's Interior Minister after unsuccessfully lobbying to have a pro-Yrigoyen governor removed.

The Socialists, who vied for the majority in the Buenos Aires City Legislature (but had little following elsewhere), themselves balked at the possibility of victory in 1928 and split during their 1927 convention over Senator Juan B. Justo's intransigent leadership of the party. Senator Justo died suddenly in January 1928, and the party presented two tickets: the Authentic Socialists, led by Congressman Mario Bravo and running only in the City of Buenos Aires, and the more conservative Independent Socialists, led Justo's running-mate, former University of La Plata Director José Nicolás Matienzo.

Election night was a referendum on the charismatic Yrigoyen, as well as on the largely positive memories voters had of his 1916–1922 term. Yrigoyen had further built on this sentiment by focusing debate in the closing days of the campaign on the future of YPF, thereby presenting himself as its best defense against the oil concern's chief antagonist, Standard Oil. His ticket swept the polls, recovering the majority it enjoyed in the Lower House in the early 1920s (with 53 of 79 seats at stake), and winning 5 of 10 contested Senate seats. His faction won majorities in all major districts: the City of Buenos Aires, and in Buenos Aires, Córdoba and Santa Fe Provinces (the latter two had been in opposition hands since 1920 and 1918, respectively). Mendoza Province, which remained in the reformist former Governor Carlos Washington Lencinas' Dissident UCR column, continued to be denied its two senators by the body, itself.

Bravo's Authentic Socialists lost to Matienzo's splinter ticket (though only an endorsement by San Juan Governor Federico Cantoni gave the latter 3 electoral votes). Roca's Unified Front, which lost in their home province of Córdoba, had endorsed the Antipersonalist UCR Melo-Gallo ticket, and pledged their 20 electors to the latter in a symbolic alliance. Minor and provincial parties, for their part, opted instead to abstain from casting most of their combined 84 electoral votes, thereby creating the largest such deficit in the history of the Argentine Electoral College (abolished in 1994 by the constitutional convention held that year). Yrigoyen's running mate, Francisco Beiró, died before taking office, and Córdoba Governor Enrique Martínez was elected to the post by the electoral college. Yrigoyen was sworn in on October 12, 1928.

== Candidates ==
- Radical Civic Union (populist): Former President Hipólito Yrigoyen of the city of Buenos Aires
- Antipersonalist Radical Civic Union/United Front (center-right): Senator Leopoldo Melo of Entre Ríos Province
- Socialist Party: Senator Mario Bravo of Tucumán Province
- Independent Socialist Party: Former Minister of Labor José Nicolás Matienzo of Buenos Aires Province
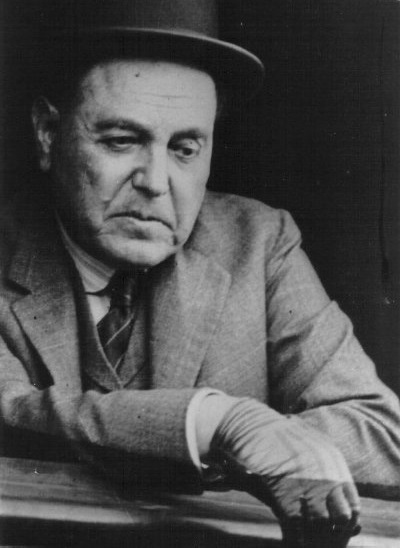
Yrigoyen

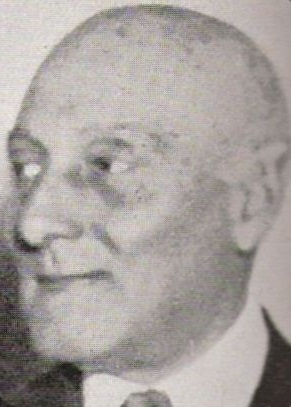
Melo

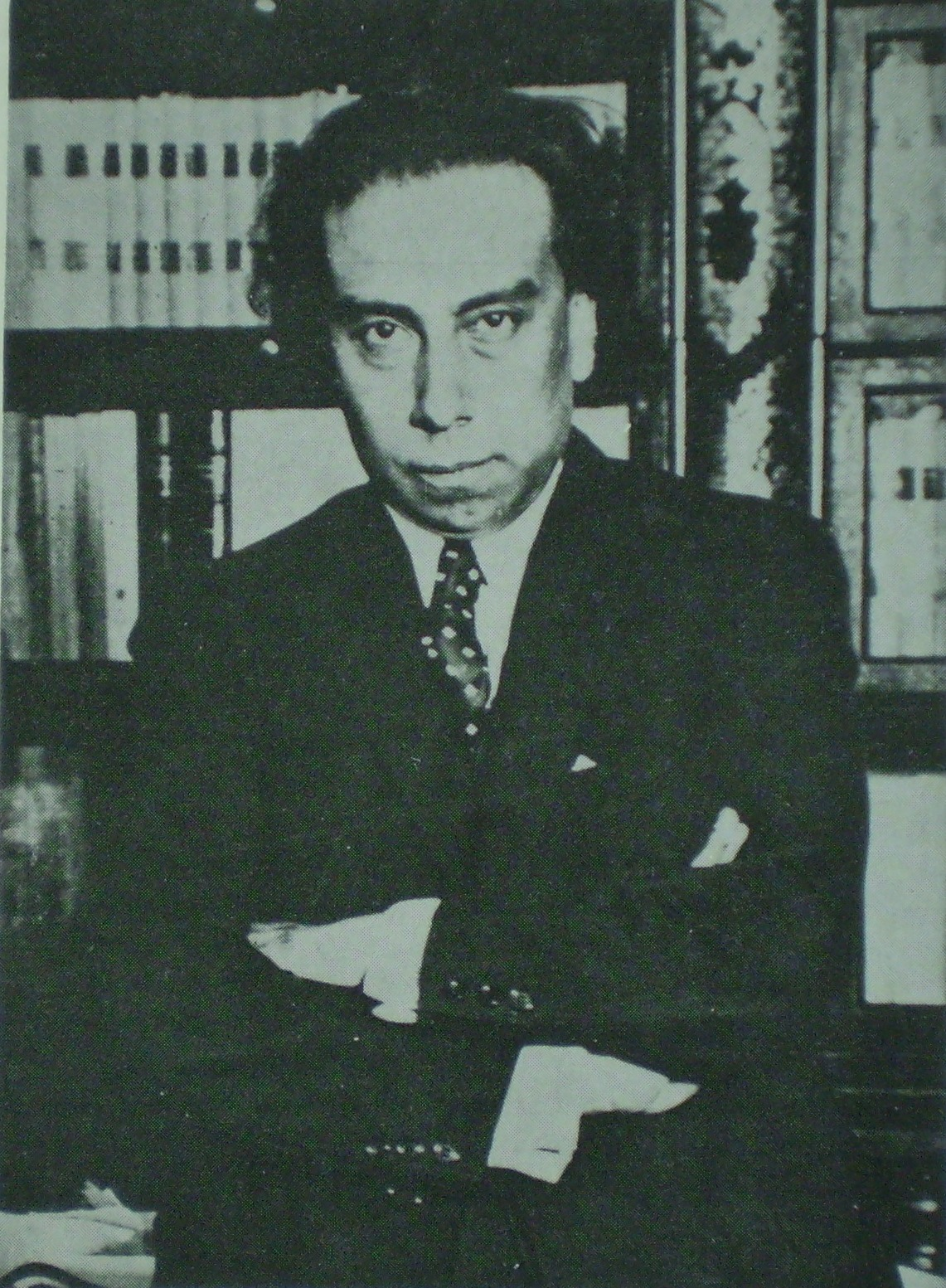
Bravo

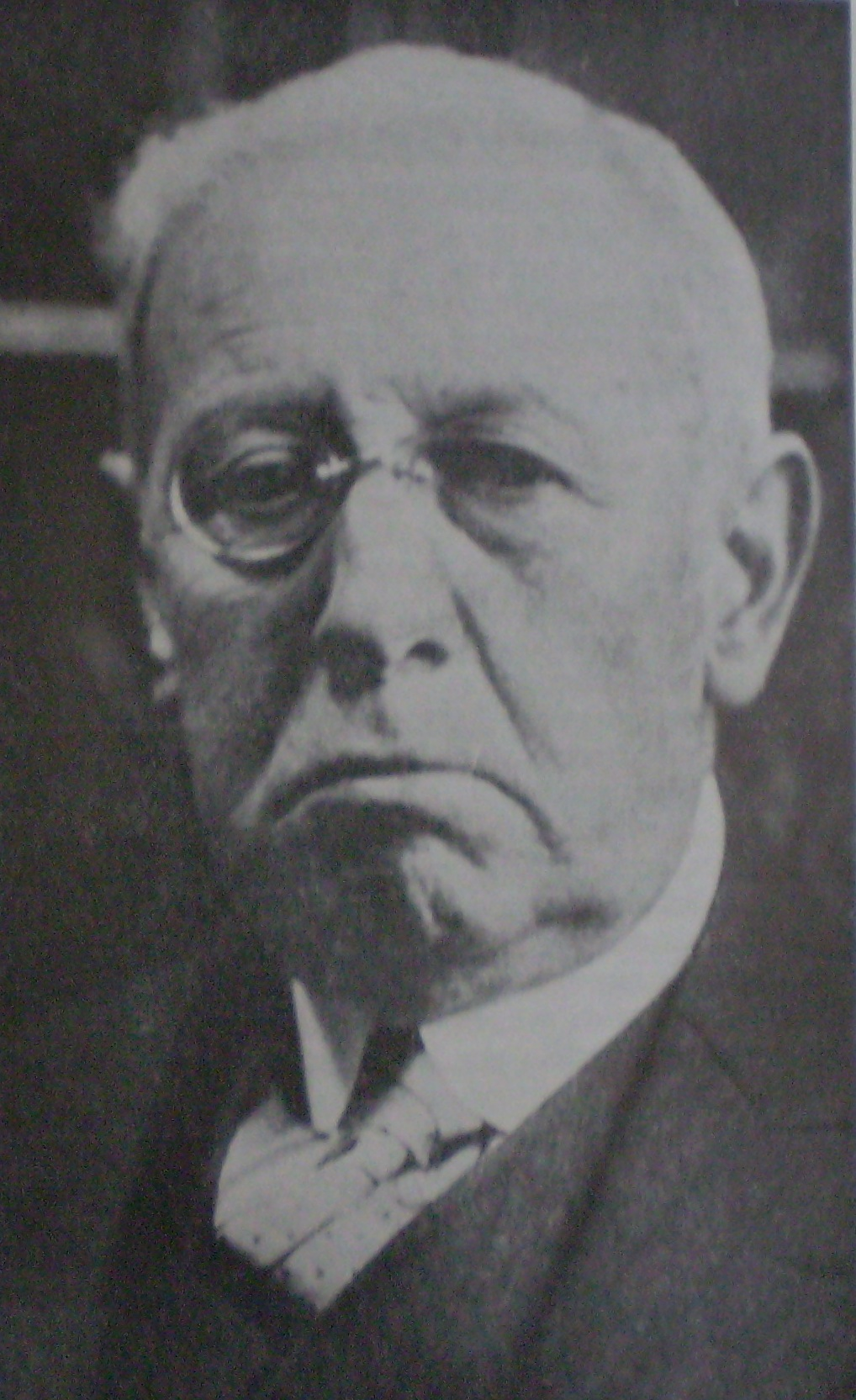
Matienzo

== Results ==
=== President ===
Candidate	Running mate	Party or alliance		Public vote		Electoral vote	
Candidate	Running mate	Party or alliance		Votes	%	Votes	%
Hipólito Yrigoyen	Francisco Beiró	Radical Civic Union		839,140	61.42	249	66.22
Leopoldo Melo	Vicente Gallo	Confederation of the Right	Antipersonalist Radical Civic Union	155,371	11.37	40	10.64
Leopoldo Melo	Vicente Gallo	Confederation of the Right	United Front	89,249	6.53	20	5.32
Leopoldo Melo	Vicente Gallo	Confederation of the Right	Conservative Party	73,048	5.35	29	7.71
Leopoldo Melo	Vicente Gallo	Confederation of the Right	Unified Radical Civic Union	47,412	3.47	14	3.72
Leopoldo Melo	Vicente Gallo	Confederation of the Right	Lencinist Radical Civic Union	20,166	1.48	5	1.33
Leopoldo Melo	Vicente Gallo	Confederation of the Right	Blockist Radical Civic Union	16,379	1.20	7	1.86
Leopoldo Melo	Vicente Gallo	Confederation of the Right	Liberal Party of Tucumán	15,718	1.15	6	1.60
Leopoldo Melo	Vicente Gallo	Confederation of the Right	Liberal Democratic Party	11,300	0.83	3	0.80
Leopoldo Melo	Vicente Gallo	Confederation of the Right	Liberal Party of Mendoza	1,407	0.10	0	0.00
Leopoldo Melo	Vicente Gallo	Confederation of the Right	Total	430,050	31.48	124	32.98
Mario Bravo	Nicolás Repetto	Socialist Party		67,423	4.94		
No candidate	No candidate	Democratic Progressive Party		14,173	1.04		
José Nicolás Matienzo	Manuel Carlés	Dissident; Radicalism	Radical Civic Union – Railway to Jáchal	3,218	0.24	3	0.80
José Nicolás Matienzo	Manuel Carlés	Dissident; Radicalism	Radical Civic Union – Railway to Calingasta	2,782	0.20	3	0.80
José Nicolás Matienzo	Manuel Carlés	Dissident; Radicalism	Total	6,000	0.44	3	0.80
Rodolfo Ghioldi	Miguel Contreras	Communist Party of Argentina		4,658	0.34		
José Fernando Penelón	Florindo Moretti	Communist Party of the Argentine Republic		1,286	0.09		
No candidate	No candidate	Communist Workers' Party		493	0.04		
No candidate	No candidate	Others		2,996	0.22		
Total				1,366,219	100.00	376	100.00
Valid votes				1,366,219	93.47		
Invalid/blank votes				95,386	6.53		
Total votes				1,461,605	100.00		
Registered voters/turnout				1,807,566	80.86		
Source: Cantón, Ministry of the Interior, Diario Santa Fe

=== Chamber of Deputies ===
Party or alliance		Votes	%	Seats	
Party or alliance		Votes	%	Won	Total
Radical Civic Union		751,044	56.89	53	89
Confederation of the Right	Unified Radical Civic Union	70,400	5.33	4	12
Confederation of the Right	United Front	67,350	5.10	0	0
Confederation of the Right	Conservative Party	65,101	4.93	8	15
Confederation of the Right	Antipersonalist Radical Civic Union	59,144	4.48	1	8
Confederation of the Right	Democratic Party of Córdoba	32,454	2.46	3	6
Confederation of the Right	Autonomist Party of Corrientes	24,871	1.88	2	3
Confederation of the Right	Lencinist Radical Civic Union	20,287	1.54	1	1
Confederation of the Right	Liberal Party of Corrientes	15,739	1.19	0	2
Confederation of the Right	Liberal Party of Tucumán	14,886	1.13	1	4
Confederation of the Right	Liberal Democratic Party	11,255	0.85	1	1
Confederation of the Right	Liberal Party of Mendoza	1,974	0.15	0	1
Confederation of the Right	Blockist Radical Civic Union			–	2
Confederation of the Right	Provincial Union			–	2
Confederation of the Right	Total	383,461	29.05	21	57
Socialist Party		70,023	5.30	0	4
Independent Socialist Party		51,273	3.88	6	6
Democratic Progressive Party		15,328	1.16	0	0
Communist Party of Argentina		4,248	0.32	0	0
Public Health Party		3,538	0.27	0	0
Communist Party of the Argentine Republic		2,082	0.16	0	0
Independent Workers' Party		1,506	0.11	0	0
Communist Workers' Party		676	0.05	0	0
National Feminist Party		215	0.02	0	0
Labor Party		114	0.01	0	0
Independents		36,611	2.77	0	0
Vacant				–	2
Total		1,320,119	100.00	80	158
Valid votes		1,320,119	94.75		
Invalid/blank votes		73,197	5.25		
Total votes		1,393,316	100.00		
Registered voters/turnout		1,676,217	83.12		
Source: Cantón, Chamber of Deputies, El Orden, Crítica
