= Agustín Pedro Justo =

18th President of Argentina

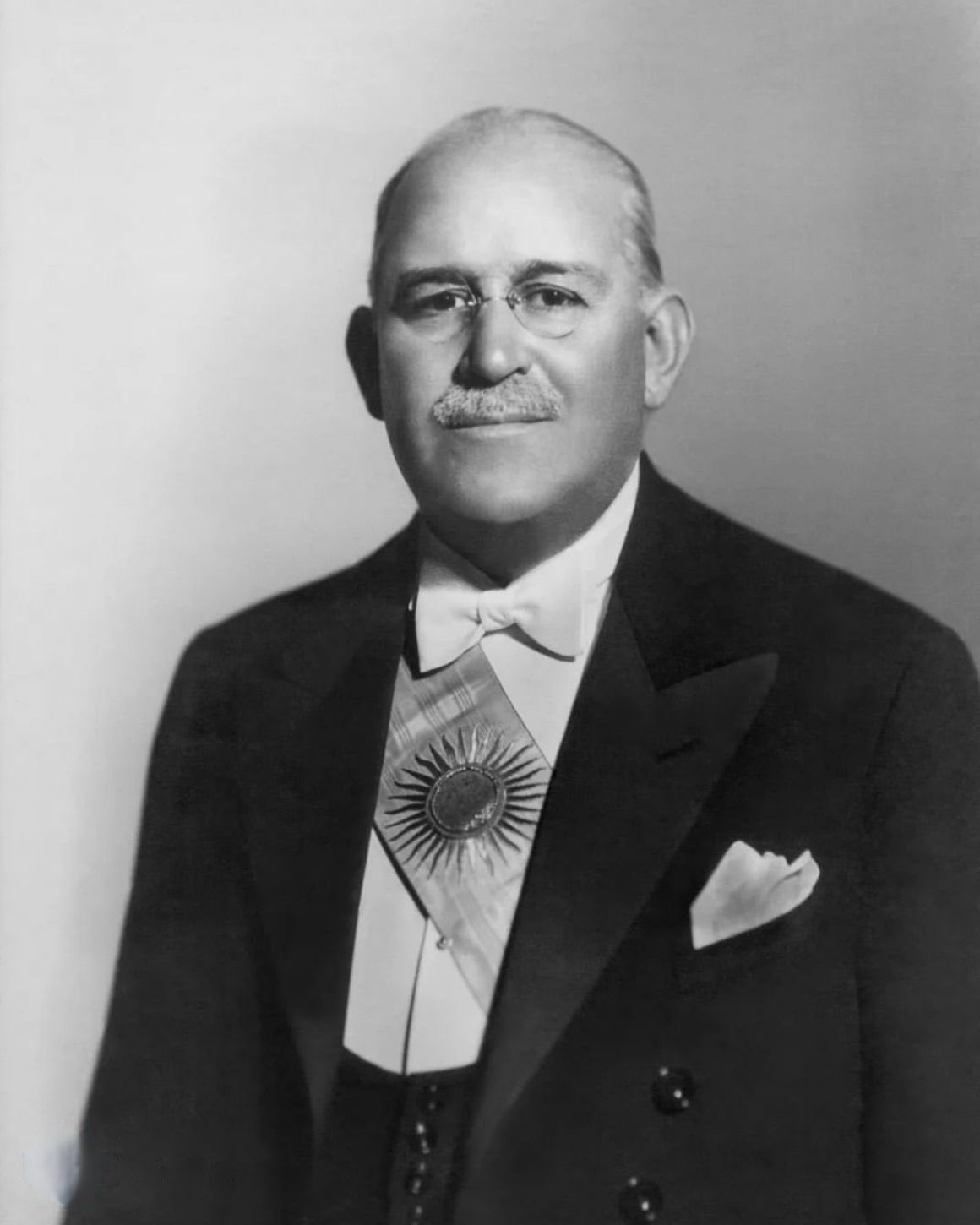
- Justo, c. 1932–1938

23rd President of Argentina
- In office 20 February 1932 – 20 February 1938
- Vice President: Julio Argentino Pascual Roca
- Preceded by: José Félix Uriburu
- Succeeded by: Roberto M. Ortiz

Minister of War
- In office 12 October 1922 – 12 October 1928
- President: Marcelo Torcuato de Alvear
- Preceded by: Julio Moreno
- Succeeded by: Luis Dellepiane

Personal details
- Born: 26 February 1876 Concepción del Uruguay, Entre Ríos
- Died: 11 January 1943 (aged 66) Buenos Aires, Argentina
- Party: Radical Antipersonalist Civic Union
- Other political affiliations: Concordancia
- Profession: Military

Military service
- Branch/service: Argentine Army
- Years of service: 1892–1931
- Rank: Major General

Agustín Pedro Justo Rolón (26 February 1876 – 11 January 1943) was the president of Argentina from 1932 to 1938, during the Infamous Decade. Justo took part in the coup of 1930, becoming president two years later thanks to widespread electoral fraud. His presidency was part of the period known as the Infamous Decade, which lasted from 1930 until 1943. He established the country's central bank and introduced a nationwide income tax together with a maternity leave insurance system and paid vacations.

Appointed War Minister by President Marcelo Torcuato de Alvear, his experience under a civilian administration and pragmatic outlook earned him the conservative Concordance's nomination for the 1931 campaign. He was elected president on 8 November 1931, supported by the political sectors that would form shortly after la Concordancia, an alliance created between the National Democratic Party (Partido Demócrata Nacional), the Anti-personalist Radical Civic Union (Unión Cívica Radical Antipersonalista) (UCRA), and the Independent Socialist Party (Partido Socialista Independiente). There were accusations of electoral fraud, and the name patriotic fraud was used for a system of control established from 1931 to 1943. Conservative groups wanted to use this to prevent any radicals from coming to power. During this period there was persistent opposition from the supporters of Yrigoyen, an earlier president, and from the Radical Civic Union.

The outstanding diplomatic work of his Foreign Minister, Carlos Saavedra Lamas, was one of the greatest accomplishments of his administration, stained by constant accusations of corruption and of delivering the national economy into the hands of foreign interests, the British in particular, with whom his vice-president Julio A. Roca Jr. had signed the Roca-Runciman Treaty. His name was mentioned as a candidate a new period during the unsteady government of Ramón Castillo, but his early death at 66 thwarted his plans. He worked on a preliminary study for the complete works of Bartolomé Mitre, whom he admired profoundly.

== Biography ==
Justo was born in Concepción del Uruguay, Entre Ríos Province. His father, also named Agustín, had been governor of Corrientes Province and was soon a national deputy. He was active in politics, and soon after his son was born, he moved with his family to Buenos Aires. His mother Otilia Rolón came from a traditional Corrientes family. When he was 11 Justo went to the Colegio Militar de la Nación (National Military College). As a cadet he joined with various other students and participated in the Revolución del Parque, taking the weapons off the guards to add to the column of the revolutionaries. Arrested and later given amnesty, he graduated with the rank of ensign.

Without abandoning his military career, he studied engineering at the University of Buenos Aires. In 1895 he was promoted to second lieutenant. In 1897 he became first lieutenant. In 1902 he became a captain. Having attained a civil engineering degree at the University of Buenos Aires, a governmental decree validated his title as a military engineer in 1904. He was appointed as teacher at the Escuela de Aplicación para Oficiales. With his promotion to the rank of major two years later he was proposed for the school of mathematics at the Military Academy and for the studies of telemetry and semaphores at the Escuela Nacional de Tiro (National Gunnery School), which would be granted in 1907.

The following year, he received the nomination as executive officer in the Batallón de Ferrocarrileros, at the same time in which they were promoting him to be subdirector at the gunnery school. With the rank of Lieutenant Colonel he completed diplomatic actions, becoming military attaché to the Argentina's envoy at the centennial festivities in Chile in 1910. His return to Argentina was to Córdoba, as commander of the Fourth Artillery Brigade.

=== Beginning of political career ===
In 1915, during the term of office of Victorino de la Plaza, he was appointed director of the Military College, a post where he would remain for the following seven years. The great influence of this position helped him to weave contacts in political circles, just as in the military. Pursuant to the radical anti-personalist political branch (those that opposed the party leadership of Hipólito Yrigoyen), he established good relations with Marcelo T. de Alvear. During his tenure he enlarged the curriculum of the college and promoted the formation of the faculty.

During Alvear's administration in 1922 he left the Military College to become the Minister of War. Promoted to the rank of brigadier general on 25 August 1923, Justo requested an increase of the defense budget to get equipment and improve the Army infrastructure. He also fomented the reorganization of the armed forces structure. At the end of 1924 he was sent as plenipotentiary to Peru, where they were celebrating the centennial of the Battle of Ayacucho. During the next few years, he temporarily was the Minister of Agriculture and Public Works, besides holding the post at as Minister of War, which he would not abandon until the end of the term of office of Alvear. In 1927 he had received the promotion to General de División (Major General).

With his constant anti-personalist temperament, Justo supported the candidates Leopoldo Melo and Vicente Gallo, of the Alvear Line of the UCR. Before the triumph of the formula of Yrigoyen and Beiró, who began in 1928 their second term of office with massive support of the voters and the majority in the House of Representatives. Justo received invitations of the ever more organized right to join the shock program against the radical caudillo. Although close to the concepts of the publications La Nueva República (The New Republic) — managed by Ernesto Palacio and the brothers Rodolfo and Julio Irazusta — and La Fronda, under the direction of Francisco Uriburu, they stayed close to the need of "order, hierarchy and authority". He did not adhere closely to them, the program of suppression of a republican government and their substitution with a corporative system, similar to the fascists in Italy and Spain, went against his liberal vocation.

=== 1930 Coup ===
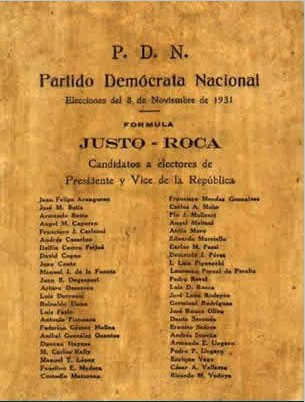
1931 ballot, Justo-Roca

Another faction assembled around Justo, not any less intent on taking arms against the constitutional government of Yrigoyen. Justo wrote for the newspapers La Nación and Crítica, actively promoted by general José Luis Meglione, a classmate of Justo, and by colonel Luis J. García, who soon would be one of the heads of the Grupo de Oficiales Unidos. Declarations made by Justo in July 1930 about the inconvenience of military intervention, which would put the constitutional rule of law in danger, testify to the opposition between the factions. By contrast with the more radicalized Argentine Navy, a significant part of the Army supported the ideas proposed by Justo, with the notable exception of the nationalist core that soon would converge at the Grupo de Oficiales Unidos. Before José Félix Uriburu, the head of an extremist group, promised to maintain institutional order, Justo agreed to the coup on 6 September. This started a military government in Argentina for the first time since the signing of the Constitution. He did not join the government's direction nor, in the first instance, the governing group, which was led by Uriburu with a cabinet that was composed largely of local lobbyists of the multinational oil companies.

Justo expressly sought to distance himself from Uriburu, who counted on a large group of supporters among the military officials. Uriburu could not get the same support from the political parties, which quickly divided themselves after Yrigoyen's death. This was the focus of the antipathy against him. He rejected the vice-presidency that Uriburu offered him, and he only briefly accepted the command of the army, resigning soon after. In Buenos Aires Province, Uriburu did not manage to implement the corporate model with which he wished to replace the republican system. This failure cost him the political career of his Interior Minister, Matías Sánchez Sorondo. Justo again rejected the offers of Uriburu to join the government and form a coalition. With the support of an alliance of the conservative National Democratic Party, the Independent Socialist Party, and the most anti-personalist faction of the Radical Party (then to be the Coalition of Parties for Democracy), he ran for president on the elections of 8 November 1931. With Yrigoyen's faction banned from the elections and its supporters using the strategy of "revolutionary abstention", Justo easily won against Lisandro de la Torre and Nicolás Repetto, although under suspicion of fraud. Julio Argentino Roca Jr., from the conservative faction, joined him as vice-president.

== Presidency (1932–1938) ==
Justo became president on 20 February 1932. In addition to political turmoil caused by the coup, he had to make progress on the problems relating to the Great Depression, which had put an end to commercial profits and the full employment enjoyed by the Yrigoyen and Alvear administrations. His first minister of the Treasury, Alberto Hueyo, took very restrictive measures against the economy. The independent socialist Antonio de Tomaso joined him in Agriculture. He reduced the public expense and restricted the circulation of currency and applied harsh fiscal measures. An empréstito patriótico, or patriotic loan, was made, attempting to strengthen the financial coffers. The first of these measures was imposed on gasoline. It was meant to finance the newly created Dirección Nacional de Vialidad, or the National Office of Public Highways, which undertook the betterment of the highway network. The difficulties for Hueyo's program would finally convince Justo to adopt this model in his economic policy. In addition, he encouraged the project of the mayor of Buenos Aires, Mariano de Vedia y Mitre, who undertook an ambitious project of urban organization, opening the Diagonal Norte and Diagonal Sur, paving Avenida General Paz, widening Avenida Corrientes, constructing the first stretch of 9 de Julio Avenue and building the Obelisco de Buenos Aires.

The substitution of Hueyo by the independent socialist Federico Pinedo would mark a change in the political scene in the government. The intervention of the government in the economy was more significant, creating the Junta Nacional de Granos, or the National Grain Committee, and of Meat, and soon after, with the advice of English economist Otto Niemeyer, the creation of the Banco Central de la República Argentina, or the Central Bank of the Argentine Republic.

=== Relationship with the UCR ===
The radical opposition was very significant. On 5 April 1931, the political ideology of the supporters of Yrigoyen had won the election for governor in the province of Buenos Aires against the hopes of Uriburu and Sánchez Sorondo; though the military government rings, cost the career of the Minister and forced Uriburu to give up his power. Before this, soldiers loyal to the constitutional government of Yrigoyen, with the support of armed civilians, organized insurrections to restore that earlier government. The first of these was directed by the Yrigoyenist general Severino Toranzo in February 1931. In June, in Curuzú Cuatiá in the province of Corrientes, they assassinated Colonel Regino Lescano, who was preparing a Yrigoyenist mobilization. In December, before an attempted coup led by Lieutenant Colonel Atilio Cattáneo, Justo decreed a state of siege, and again imprisoned the old Yrigoyen, and also arrested Alvear, Ricardo Rojas, Honorio Pueyrredón, and other leaders of the party.

In 1933, the attempted coups continued. Buenos Aires, Corrientes, Entre Rios, and Misiones would be the stage of radical uprisings, which would not end before more than a thousand people being detained. Seriously ill, Yrigoyen was returned to Buenos Aires and kept under house arrest. He died on 3 June, and his burial in La Recoleta Cemetery was an occasion of a mass demonstration. In December, during a meeting of the national convention of the UCR, a joint uprising of the military and politicians broke loose in Santa Fe, Rosario, and Paso de los Libres. José Benjamin Abalos, who was Yrigoyen's ex-Minister, and Colonel Roberto Bosch were arrested during the uprising and the organizers and leaders of the party were imprisoned at Martín García. Alvear, Justo's former patron, was exiled, while others were detained in the penitentiary in Ushuaia.

=== Roca-Runciman Treaty ===
One of the most controversial events of Justo's presidency took place in 1933, when the measures of production protectionism that were adopted by the UK led Justo to send his vice-president at the head of a technology delegation, to deal with the adoption of a commercial agreement that might benefit Argentina. At the 1932 Ottawa Conference, the British had adopted measures that favored imports from its own colonies and dominions. The pressure from the Argentine landowners for whom the government restored trade with the main buyer of Argentine grain and meat had been very strong. Led by the president of the British Trade Council, Viscount Walter Runciman, they were intense and resulted in the signing on 27 April of the Roca-Runciman Treaty.

The treaty created a scandal because the UK allotted Argentina a quota less than any of its other dominions. In exchange for many concessions to British companies, 390,000 tons of meat per year were allotted to Argentina. British refrigerated shippers arranged 85% of exportation. The tariffs of the railways operated by the UK were not regulated. They had not established customs fees over coal. They had given special dispensation to the British companies with investments in Argentina. They had reduced the prices of their exports. As many problems resulted from the declarations of the vice-president Roca, who affirmed after the signing of the treaty that "by its economic importance, Argentina resembled just a large British dominion."

Lisandro de la Torre, one of his most vociferous and principal opponents, mocking the words of Roca in an editorial, wrote that "in these conditions we wouldn't be able to say that Argentina had been converted into a British dominion because England does not take the liberty to impose similar humiliations upon its dominions."

In the National Democratic Party, one of those who had supported the nomination of Justo for President, had split because of this controversy. Finally, the Senate rescinded the treaty on 28 July. Many worker strikes followed the deliberations, especially in Santa Fé Province, which ended with government intervention.

== Death ==
He died in 1943 and was buried in La Recoleta Cemetery in Buenos Aires.

== See also ==
- List of heads of state of Argentina

Political offices
Preceded by Julio Moreno	Minister of War; 1922–1928	Succeeded by Luis Dellepiane
Preceded by José Félix Uriburu	President of Argentina; 1932–1938	Succeeded by Roberto María Ortiz
Party political offices
Alliance established	Concordancia nominee for President of Argentina; 1931	Succeeded by Roberto María Ortiz
