= Nicolás Repetto =

Argentine politician (1871–1965)

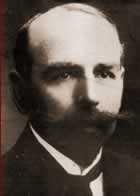
Nicolás Repetto

Nicolás Repetto (21 October 1871 – 29 November 1965) was an Argentine physician and leader of the Socialist Party of Argentina.

== Biography ==
Nicolás Repetto was born in Buenos Aires in 1871 and enrolled at the prestigious Colegio Nacional de Buenos Aires, a public college preparatory school. He was introduced to politics by a friend and medical student, Juan B. Justo, who enrolled Repetto in the reformist Civic Youth Union, by which Repetto took part in the violently-repressed Revolution of the Park, in 1890. He married Fenia Chertkoff, a feminist and sculptor. Repetto received a medical degree from the University of Buenos Aires in 1895, earning an internship at the renowned Inselspital in Bern, Switzerland. He began his practice as a pediatric surgeon in 1897, while teaching at his alma mater's important School of Medicine.

He established the Diario del Pueblo (People's Journal) with Justo and in 1900, joined the Argentine Socialist Party (founded by Justo and others in 1896). He and Justo founded a cooperative, El Hogar Obrero ("The Working Home") in 1905. The establishment quickly became a leading homebuilder and general store operator, and grew with Argentina's booming economy of the time. Publishing numerous articles in peer-reviewed journals, he became part in 1906 of the charity emergency clinic operated by La Prensa (then Argentina's second-most circulated newspaper). These accomplishments and the enactment of universal (male) suffrage in Argentina helped lead to Repetto's election to the Argentine Chamber of Deputies for the federal district of Buenos Aires, in 1912. A close ally of the Federación Agraria Argentina, a small-holders' organization, he supported assistance to family farms and worked to expose abusive labor conditions in plantations throughout the north. He received his party's nomination for the presidency in 1922, a campaign hampered by violence from the paramilitary Argentine Patriotic League and by the popularity of the incumbent, centrist UCR. Repetto resigned from Congress in 1923, but returned the following year. He then lost his wife in 1927, and his friend and closest political associate, Senator Juan B. Justo, died just weeks before the 1928 election, leaving the party's leadership to him.

A coup d'état removing the aging, populist President Hipólito Yrigoyen in 1930 gave way to new elections the following year. Facing long odds, Repetto negotiated a "Civil Alliance" with the reformist Democratic Progressive Party (PDP), and agreed to be the running mate for PDP leader Lisandro de la Torre, a well-known anti-corruption activist. The caretaker government, led by General José Félix Uriburu, supported the center-right Concordance and refused to guarantee free and fair elections (or, even safety) for the opposition, leading the UCR to boycott the polls. This left the Civil Alliance poised for possible victory, and Repetto was imprisoned. On election night - amid widespread irregularities - the Concordance won a sizable margin of the popular vote (a practice justified by the regime as "patriotic fraud"). The two parties were nearly tied in the electoral college, however, and no party had received a majority of electors; though ultimately, enough faithless electors were swayed into supporting the Concordance.

Socialist and PDP victories in congressional races raised the possibility of another, similar alliance for 1937. Lisandro de la Torre resigned from the Senate, however, following a 1935 assassination attempt on the floor of the chamber, itself. Repetto accepted the Socialist nomination for the 1937 campaign, though the return of the UCR to national politics far overshadowed his party's chances. A second coup d'état dissolved Congress in 1943, ending his tenure there. Repetto led his party in 1945 into the Democratic Union, an uneasy alliance led by the UCR and conservatives united mainly by their shared opposition to the populist Juan Perón. Following Perón's election, Repetto was jailed (as were growing numbers of opposition figures). The 1955 overthrow of the increasingly autocratic Perón led to his return to national politics, and the interim president, General Eduardo Lonardi, named him to his influential Civilian Advisory Board. Following the victory of a UCR splinter candidate endorsed by the exiled Perón, Arturo Frondizi, the Socialist Party was divided over the degree of opposition to resurgent Peronism. The party's leaders, Repetto and veteran labor reformer Alfredo Palacios, were unable to prevent a schism in 1958 and Américo Ghioldi led the more anti-peronist faction into the Democratic Socialist Party, which split the Socialist vote in the 1963 election.

The author of numerous books on Argentine history and policy, as well as of a biography of his friend, Juan B. Justo, Repetto died in Buenos Aires in 1965. He was 94.
