= Federación de Obreros y Empleados Ferroviarios =

Argentine railway union

Federación de Obreros y Empleados Ferroviarios ('Railway Workers and Employees Federation', abbreviated FOEF) was a trade union of railway workers in Argentina. FOEF was founded in 1939 by syndicalists and Radicals, as a rival union of the established Unión Ferroviaria (UF). The formation of FOEF was encouraged by the government. However, the government of Roberto María Ortiz soon shifted its position and withdrew its support FOEF. FOEF was then dissolved in February 1940, and its members rejoined UF.
