= Leopoldo Melo =

Argentine lawyer and politician (1869–1951)

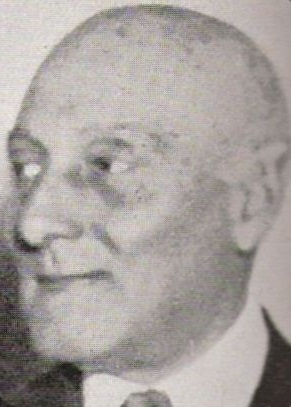

Minister of the Interior of Argentina
- In office February 20, 1932 – April 29, 1936
- President: Agustín Justo
- Preceded by: Octavio Pico
- Succeeded by: Ramón Castillo

National Senator
- In office June 5, 1917 – September 6, 1930
- Constituency: Entre Ríos

National Deputy
- In office April 25, 1914 – June 5, 1917
- Constituency: Entre Ríos

Personal details
- Born: 1869 Diamante, Entre Ríos Province
- Died: 1951 (aged 81–82) Pinamar, Buenos Aires Province
- Other political affiliations: Radical Civic Union
- Education: University of Buenos Aires
- Profession: Lawyer, Academic

Leopoldo Melo (1869 – 1951) was an Argentine lawyer, diplomat, and politician. He was a leading figure in the Radical Civic Union, a nominee for president, and later minister of the interior.

== Biography ==
Leopoldo Melo was born in Diamante, Entre Ríos Province, in 1869. He enrolled at the University of Buenos Aires and earned a Law Degree, later becoming an important leader in the centrist Radical Civic Union (UCR), the party chiefly responsible for the adoption of universal male suffrage in Argentina, in 1912. He was elected to the Argentine Chamber of Deputies for Entre Ríos Province in 1914 and to the Argentine Senate in 1917. He taught at his alma mater's Law School and was its Dean in 1920 and 1921 while he was in Congress.

Elected on the UCR ticket, Melo broke with longtime UCR leader Hipólito Yrigoyen following the 1922 elections. Yrigoyen's fractious opposition, which together continued to enjoy a majority in the Upper House, appointed Melo Provisional President of the Senate in the same year. He led the establishment of the "Antipersonalist" UCR in 1924, becoming its caucus leader in the Senate.

He secured his party's nomination for the presidency ahead of the 1928 election. Although the voters' support for the state oil concern established by Yrigoyen during his first term, YPF, and nostalgia for the aging leader himself translated into a landslide defeat for Melo and his running-mate, Vicente Gallo.

Following General José Félix Uriburu's 1930 coup against President Yrigoyen, Melo endorsed the conservative candidate (and Uriburu's pick), General Agustín Justo, because the UCR nominee, former president Marcelo Torcuato de Alvear had been reunited with the Yrigoyen faction. Amid widespread irregularities, the Concordance formed by Melo and Justo won the 1931 elections, for which Melo was rewarded with an appointment to the powerful post of interior minister. Under his aegis, the special branch of the Federal Police was created, implementing a policy of systematic torture of opposition figures.

Melo was dismissed as interior minister in 1936. In 1939, he was named representative to the Pan-American Union, where he participated in a mutual defense treaty entered into by the United States and most of the other nations of the Americas in 1940 as a response to World War II.

Melo retired from politics and continued to teach commercial and maritime law; he died in the seaside resort city of Pinamar in 1951.
