= Concordancia (Argentina) =

Center-right political party in Argentina during the Infamous Decade (1931-43)

Concordance Concordancia
- Political leader: Agustín Justo
- Ideological leader: Leopoldo Melo
- Founded: 31 July 1931
- Dissolved: 4 June 1943
- Headquarters: Buenos Aires
- Ideology: Conservatism; Radicalism; Anti-Yrigoyenism; Economic nationalism
- Political position: Centre-right to right-wing
- Members: PDN; UCR-A; PSI; In parlament and elections: UCR-SF; URCU; PLCo; DP-BB; UCR-B; PPoJ; UCR-A - IS; LPoSJ; PDN - PL - UCR-A; PACo; UCR-A (T); UCR-A (A d M); RNDN; UCR-S; UCR-BA; UCR-SJ; UCR-I; AP - PACo; UCR-A (Entre Ríos)

The Concordancia was a political alliance in Argentina. Three presidents belonging to it, Agustín P. Justo, Roberto Ortiz, and Ramón Castillo were in power from 1931 to 1943, a period known in Argentina as the "Infamous Decade".

== Overview ==
=== Formation of the alliance ===
A coup d'état deposed the aging President Hipólito Yrigoyen on September 6, 1930. His country's first leader elected via secret male universal suffrage, Yrigoyen had strained alliances within his own centrist Radical Civic Union (UCR) through frequent interventions against unwillful governors and had set business powerhouses such as Standard Oil against him through his support of YPF, the state-owned oil concern founded in 1922. Staging its first coup since 1861, the Argentine military, then dominated by conservative, rural interests, called on José Félix Uriburu, a retired general and member of the Supreme War Council, to assume the role of Provisional President. The ailing Uriburu called general elections for November 1931.

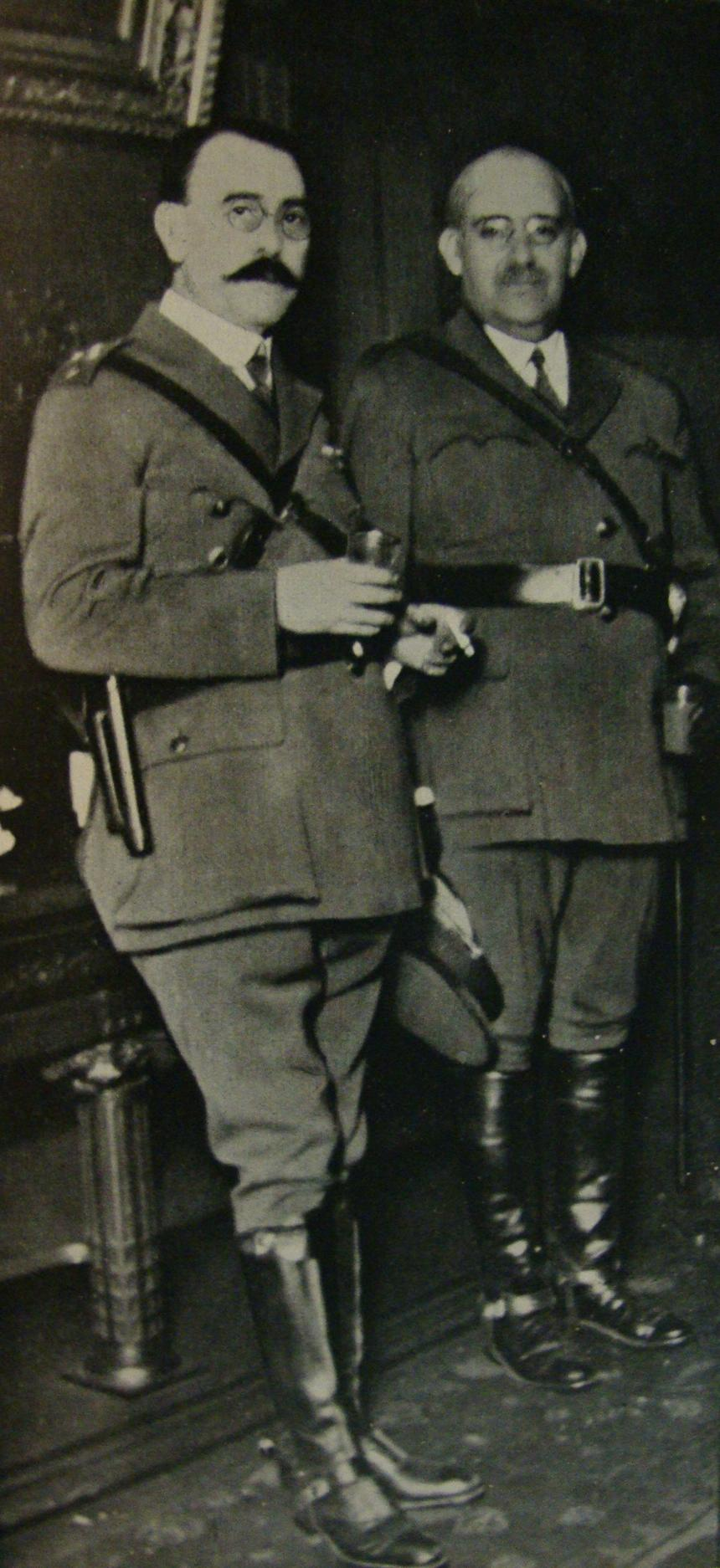
Generals Uriburu and Justo formed the Concordance with right-wing politicians who shared their distrust of the electorate.

Yrigoyen's opponents within the UCR during the 1920s, who referred to themselves as "Antipersonalists" (in reference to their belief that the populist leader was advancing a personality cult) became divided by the 1930 coup. Opponents of the coup itself would support former President Marcelo Torcuato de Alvear, while more conservative UCR figures supported former Senate President Leopoldo Melo. These latter, in turn, joined Conservative and Democratic leaders (successors of the National Autonomist Party (PAN) that had controlled Argentine politics from 1874 to 1916) following a meeting in the Hotel Castelar in downtown Buenos Aires, and the resulting agreement became known as the "Concordance."

Enjoying President Uriburu's support, the Concordance did not run as such, but rather on the National Democratic ticket, as well as a number of smaller ones. Initially rejected by Yrigoyen's supporters and moderates alike, National Democrats openly defended the 1930 coup, arguing that the country's social, economic and institutional fabric had been at risk of unraveling. Their opposition initially rallied behind Alvear's UCR Renewal Front. Uriburu, however, had him deported, and with his supporters' boycott of the election, opposition to the Concordance organized behind the Civil Alliance (the Democratic Progressive Party (PDP) and the Socialist Party).

Melo and other Concordance chose as their standard-bearer General Agustín Justo, who was not from the landed oligarchy to which most Concordance leaders belonged, and had been President Alvear's War Minister. Uriburu employed less pretense, however, and established the Argentine Civic Legion, an armed fascist organization, to intimidate the opposition. Amid widespread irregularities, Justo was elected, and took office in February 1932.

Much of Justo's cabinet reflected the alliances that had created the Concordance:

- Former Córdoba Governor Julio Roca was the son of the late PAN leader, Julio A. Roca, and had led the Democratic Party. He would now serve as Vice President.
- Leopoldo Melo, the Antipersonalist leader, was handed the powerful Interior Ministry, which oversaw law enforcement and the administration of elections, among other key functions.
- Ramón Castillo, a feudal landowner and old-line PAN Conservative, was named Minister of Justice.
- Antonio de Tomaso and Federico Pinedo, founders of the splinter Independent Socialist Party, were appointed ministers of Agriculture and the Economy, respectively.

=== Legacy ===
The Concordance was organized by leaders with agricultural interests, and owed its existence in no small measure to Standard Oil and other trusts (which lobbied the Argentine military for a coup against Yrigoyen). The regime's economic policies were more pragmatic than these ties might have suggested, however, and reflected both nationalism, as well as a priority on recovering the Argentine economy from the effects of the Great Depression (GDP fell by one fourth between 1929 and 1932).

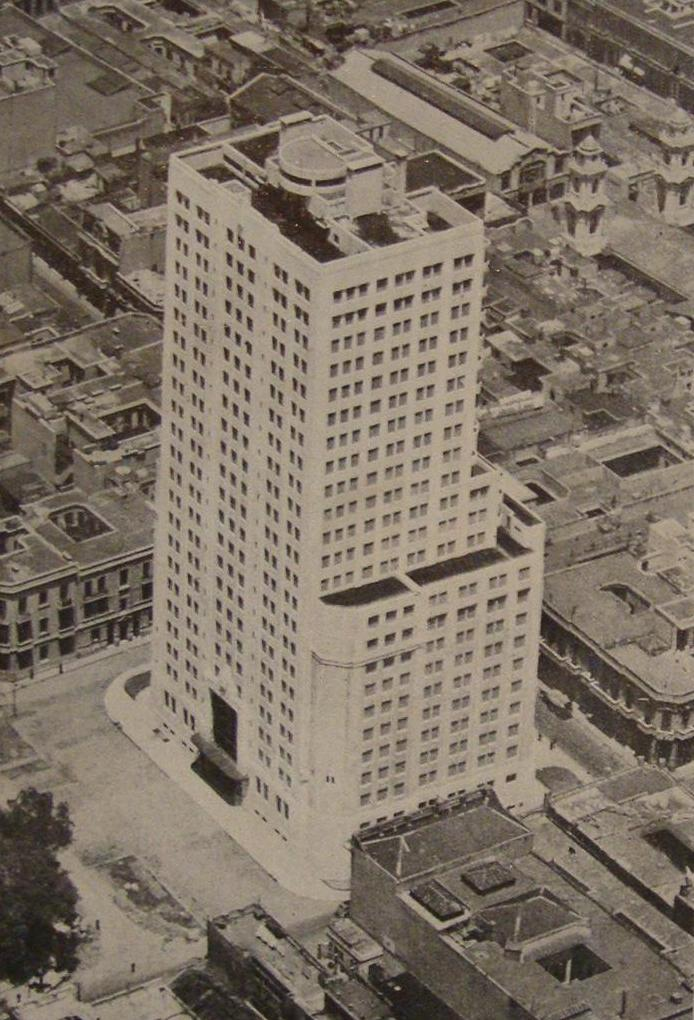
The new headquarters of the Ministry of Public Works reflected an emphasis on development projects.

Tax, tariff and trade policies were formulated to reduce the public debt, to discourage the import of consumer goods, and to secure bilateral trade agreements with nations best positioned to supply Argentina with the capital goods needed for industrialization. The goal of import substitution industrialization guided these and other domestic policies, including a more conciliatory stance towards labor unions than had been expected when Uriburu left office. Uriburu's deep cuts in public works and other spending were, likewise, reversed. The National Highway Bureau, commodity Regulatory Boards (Juntas) and the Central Bank were established. The economy recovered from the depression, albeit slowly, and by 1943, value added by manufacturing exceeded that of agriculture for the first time in the historically agrarian country's history.

The Concordance administration also practiced client politics for traditionally powerful interests in Argentina, however. Railways and abattoirs with ties to the government were left unregulated, and national interests were to some extent subordinated to those of the British Empire. Among the era's most controversial policies in this regard was the Roca-Runciman Treaty, which exempted British imports from protectionist barriers applied to other suppliers', penalized local competitors of the Anglo-Argentine Tramway service, and mandated the deposit, in escrow at the Bank of England, of any Argentine surpluses earned in the bilateral trade, while freeing restrictions on the repatriation of factor income earned by British firms in Argentina.

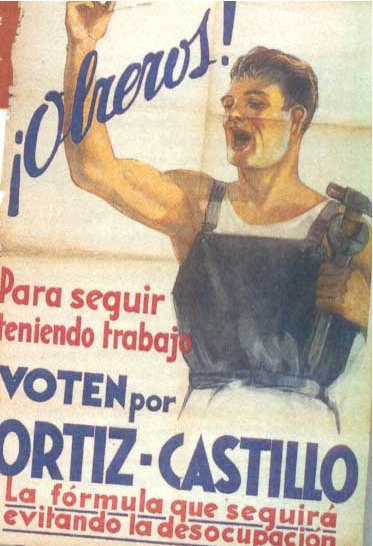
Though founded by agrarian interests, the Concordance encouraged industrialization, and courted the labor vote.

The regime was authoritarian in numerous ways. The chief party in opposition in the regime's early years, the Democratic Progressive Party (PDP), was repeatedly denied victories at the provincial and congressional level alike. Certain abuses, such as the use of presidential "intervention" to remove opposition governors, had become routine in Argentine politics; indeed, the deposed Yrigoyen ordered no less than 18 gubernatorial removals during his tenure (including numerous ones from his own party).

The Concordance regime resorted to unprecedented electoral fraud, however, and where ballot stuffing, voter intimidation, the arrest of voting precinct officials, and violence were not employed to guarantee Concordance majorities, results could be annulled (as occurred in Buenos Aires and Santa Fe Province, the nation's two largest at the time). At least one political assassination took place, as well (that of Senator Enzo Bordabehere).

Justo sought a patina of legitimacy over his government, and made a gentlemen's agreement with Alvear in 1935, whereby the UCR leader could return to Argentina and campaign for the presidency on fair terms. The 1937 elections, however, included the names of so many deceased that, according to one observer, "democracy was extended to the hereafter," and the Concordance candidate, Roberto María Ortiz, was handily elected. One of the beneficiaries of the system, Buenos Aires Governor Manuel Fresco, was himself removed by President Ortiz at the behest of ultraconservatives.

This practice, made explicitly illegal by the Sáenz Peña Law of 1912, was openly defended by numerous Concordance figures, who believed it to be the only alternative to mob rule. The rhetoric used in its defense caused the policy to become known by a term of bitter humor coined by activist Deodoro Roca: "patriotic fraud."

The Concordance administration ended when, on June 4, 1943, President Ramón Castillo's decision to be succeeded by Salta Province Governor Robustiano Patrón Costas (who, like Castillo, represented feudal interests), resulted in the former's military overthrow.
