= Francisco A. Barroetaveña =

Argentine lawyer and politician

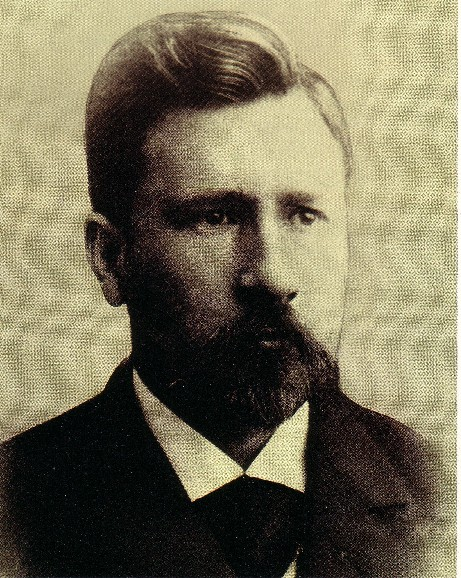
Francisco Barroetaveña, president of the Civic Youth Union

Francisco Antonio Barroetaveña (1856–1933) was an Argentine lawyer and politician, founder of the Civic Youth Union, the Civic Union, and co-founder of the Radical Civic Union.

== Biography ==
Born in Gualeguay, Entre Ríos, Barroetaveña owed his fame to an article published in La Nación on August 20, 1899, titled ''"¡Tu quoque juventud! En tropel al éxito" — "You too, youth, in the rush for success!" — which criticized young people who supported the regime of Miguel Juárez Celman:

"This affiliation is nothing more than the renunciation of civic life by the young, in favor of absorption into a superior will that converts them into the mere instruments of the Executive".

The article precipitated a historic political movement that led first to the creation of the Civic Youth Union, of which Barroetaveña was president, then to the creation of the Civic Union in 1890, then to the Revolution of the Park, and in 1891 to the creation of the Radical Civic Union, of which he was a founding member and national deputy on various occasions.

Within the Radical Civic Union he was allied with Leandro Alem and Marcelo T. de Alvear, and tenaciously opposed to Hipólito Yrigoyen.

He left the Radical Civic Union and joined the Democratic Progressive Party. In 1932 he ran for the presidency on behalf of the PDP-PS alliance.

Barroetaveña was an active Freemason and a prominent figure in Argentine Freemasonry.

== See also ==
- Civic Youth Union
- Radical Civic Union
- Revolution of the Park
