= Roberto Marcelino Ortiz =

19th President of Argentina

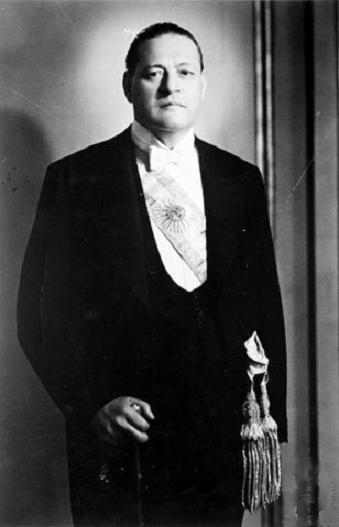
- Official portrait, 1938

24th President of Argentina
- In office 20 February 1938 – 26 June 1942
- Vice President: Ramón Castillo
- Preceded by: Agustín P. Justo
- Succeeded by: Ramón Castillo

Personal details
- Born: 24 September 1886 Buenos Aires, Argentina
- Died: 15 July 1942 (aged 55) Buenos Aires, Argentina
- Party: Antipersonalist Radical Civic Union
- Other political affiliations: Concordancia
- Spouse: María Luisa Iribarne Daubert
- Profession: Lawyer

Jaime Gerardo Roberto Marcelino Ortiz (24 September 1886 – 15 July 1942) was President of Argentina from 1938 until his resignation in 1942. He became president in 1938 following the 1937 presidential election, described as being among the most fraudulent in Argentine history. His main management objective was to end fraud. The attempt to normalize the institutions confronted him with his vice president, Ramón Castillo, leader of the conservative sectors of the government coalition. The president and vice president belonged to different political groupings. Ortiz was a radical antipersonnel and Castillo was a conservative in the National Democratic Party. Both were part of the formula of Concordancia, a coalition that had ruled since 1932.

== Life ==
Ortiz was born in Buenos Aires on 24 September 1886. As a student at the University of Buenos Aires, he participated in the unsuccessful Argentine Revolution of 1905. In 1909 he graduated from the university and became a lawyer.

He became active in the Radical Civic Union and was elected to the Argentine National Congress in 1920. He served as Minister of Public Works from 1925 to 1928. He supported the Revolution of 1930 and served as Minister of the Treasury from 1936 to 1937. Beside his support for the coup d'état, he rejected José Félix Uriburu's attempt to create a "corporatist" government (inspired by Mussolini's fascism in Italy), arguing that this model was not working in Europe.

== Presidency ==
In the presidential elections of 1937, Ortiz won as the official government candidate. The opposition accused him of participating in fraud, as irregularities were widespread. Ortiz never denied these charges, but once he took office, he tried to make Argentine politics more open and democratic. He also presided over the passage of a law in September 1939 that introduced a maximum eight-hour workday, together with the introduction of social insurance for the national merchant marine. Soon after becoming president, Ortiz became seriously ill with diabetes and on 3 July 1940, he delegated his powers to Vice President Ramón Castillo. He favored the Allies during World War II, but because of opposition within the army, he did not break relations with the Axis powers. He resigned from the presidency on 24 June 1942, three weeks before dying of bronchial pneumonia at age 55.

== Honours ==
- Order of Isabella the Catholic
- Order of the White Rose of Finland

== See also ==
- History of Argentina

Political offices
Preceded by Agustín Pedro Justo	President of Argentina; 1938–1942	Succeeded by Ramón Castillo
Party political offices
Preceded by Agustín Pedro Justo	Concordancia nominee for President of Argentina; 1937	Alliance dissolved
