= Democratic Party (Argentina) =

Political party in Argentina

Democratic Party Partido Demócrata
- Abbreviation: PD
- President: Carlos Balter
- Secretary-General: Estella Güerci
- Founder: Robustiano Patrón Costas
- Founded: 1931; 2019 (Note: Refoundation at national level)
- Dissolved: 1958 (Note: Dissolved at national level)
- Preceded by: National Autonomist Party
- Headquarters: Buenos Aires
- Ideology: National conservatism; Liberal conservatism
- Political position: Right-wing
- National affiliation: La Libertad Avanza (since 2021); Concordancia (1931–1943)
- Colours: Dark blue; Blue
- Seats in the Chamber of Deputies: 7 / 257
- Seats in the Senate: 1 / 72

The Democratic Party (Spanish: Partido Demócrata, PD) is a conservative political party in Argentina created in 1931. Founded as the National Democratic Party (Spanish: Partido Demócrata Nacional, PDN), it was generally known simply as Conservative Party (Spanish: Partido Conservador). It is considered the successor of the National Autonomist Party (PAN), which disappeared in 1916. It is made up of seven district parties: Democratic Party of Buenos Aires, Democratic Party of the Federal Capital, Democratic Party of Chaco, Democratic Party of Córdoba, Democratic Party of Mendoza, Democratic Party of San Luis and Democratic Party of Santa Fe. It also has provisional legal status in San Juan and provincial personality in Misiones.

Along with the Antipersonalist Radical Civic Union (UCR-A) and the Independent Socialist Party (PSI) it was a part of the Concordancia, a coalition government that ruled between 1932 and 1943, a period of Argentine history known as the "Infamous Decade", characterised by massive voter fraud.

Among its leading figures were Robustiano Patrón Costas, Julio Argentino Pascual Roca, Manuel Fresco and Rodolfo Moreno. Ramón S. Castillo, Vice-President to Roberto María Ortiz, who went to serve as acting President between 1940 and 1942, and later as President until June 4, 1943, was a member of this party. The party was renamed in 1946 as the Democratic Party.

After the "Revolución Libertadora" (1955–1958), the military uprising which overthrew Juan Perón, the party was dissolved at a national level, with only a few regional branches remaining active, such as the Democratic Party of the City of Buenos Aires or the Democratic Party of Córdoba.

In 2019, the party emerged again at a national level after 61 years. For the 2023 Argentine general election, they joined La Libertad Avanza coalition led by Javier Milei and party member Victoria Villarruel. Milei won the election in the run-off, and the Democratic Party obtained seven seats in the Chamber of Deputies and one in the Senate.

== Symbols ==
National Democratic Party

=== Flag ===
National Democratic Party flag

== See also ==
- Infamous Decade
- Agustín Pedro Justo
- Roberto María Ortiz
- Ramón S. Castillo
