= La Cocha =

Coordinates: 27°46′12″S 65°35′09″W

- Interactive map of La Cocha
- Country: Argentina
- Province: Tucumán Province

Government
  - Type: Municipality
  - Intendant: Gabriela Susana Rodríguez (PJ)
- Time zone: UTC−3 (ART)

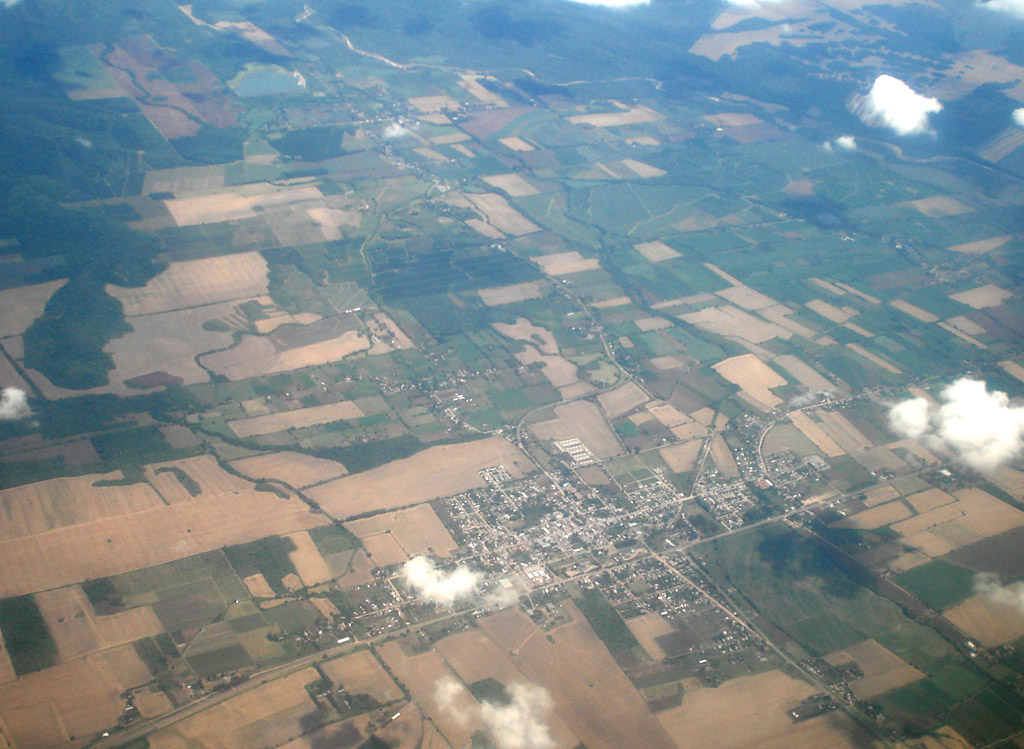
La Cocha

La Cocha is a settlement in Tucumán Province in northern Argentina.
