= Vicente Gallo =

Argentine politician (1873–1942)

Vicente C. Gallo
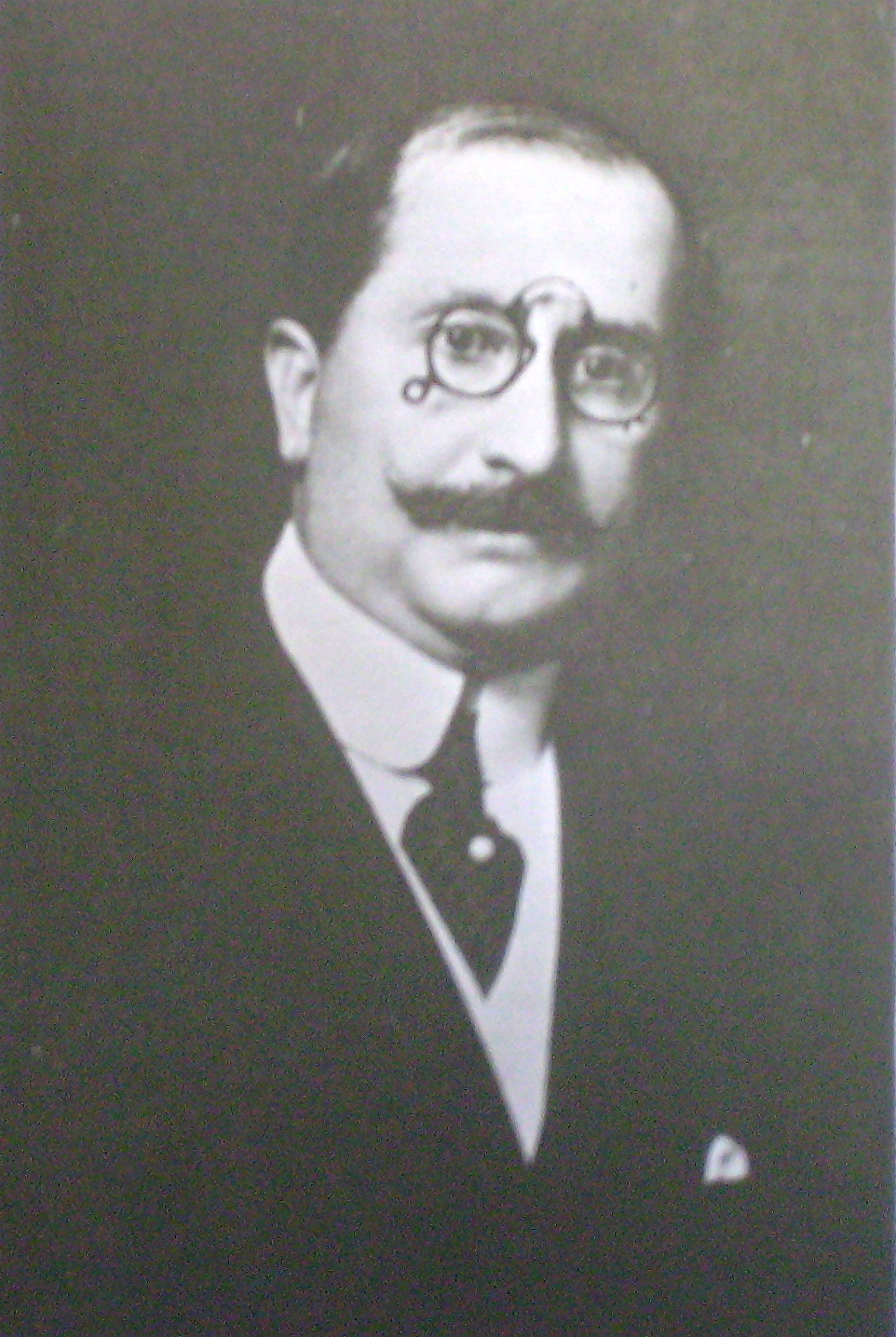

Minister of the Interior
- In office October 12, 1923 – July 27, 1925
- President: Marcelo T. de Alvear
- Preceded by: José Nicolás Matienzo
- Succeeded by: José P. Tamborini

Personal details
- Born: October 3, 1873 San Miguel de Tucumán
- Died: June 3, 1942 (aged 68)
- Party: Radical Civic Union; Antipersonalist Radical Civic Union
- Education: University of Buenos Aires
- Profession: Politician

Vicente Carmelo Gallo (October 3, 1873 – June 3, 1942) was an Argentine lawyer, academic, politician, and member of the Radical Civic Union and the Antipersonalist Radical Civic Union.

== Life ==
Born in San Miguel de Tucumán, Gallo joined the Radical Civic Union (UCR) from its inception, forming part of a group of young people who worked with Hipólito Yrigoyen in the mid-1890s to secure universal male suffrage. Following the passage of the Sáenz Peña Law to that effect, he was elected to Congress in 1912 on the UCR ticket, and to the Senate (1919-1923), always representing the city of Buenos Aires.

In 1920, Gallo was one of the founding members of the Argentine Patriotic League, a far-right paramilitary organization. President Marcelo Torcuato de Alvear named Gallo Minister of Internal Affairs in 1923, and in 1924, he was part of a group of UCR members who broke with their longtime leader, the populist Yrigoyen, and formed the splinter Antipersonalist UCR. He resigned in 1926 when Alvear declined to support his proposal for a federal intervention in Buenos Aires Province, where a moderate UCR figure, Valentín Vergara, had been elected governor.

Supported by conservatives since his attempted removal of Governor Vergara, he was the Anti-Personalist UCR candidate for Vice-President, as running mate to Leopoldo Melo, in the 1928 elections. Yrigoyen defeated their ticket in a landslide, however.

Between 1934 and 1941 Gallo was Dean of the University of Buenos Aires, where he was a professor in Administrative Law. He was married to Celia Gallo, the daughter of his uncle, politician Delfín Gallo.
