= José Nicolás Matienzo =

Argentine lawyer, writer and politician

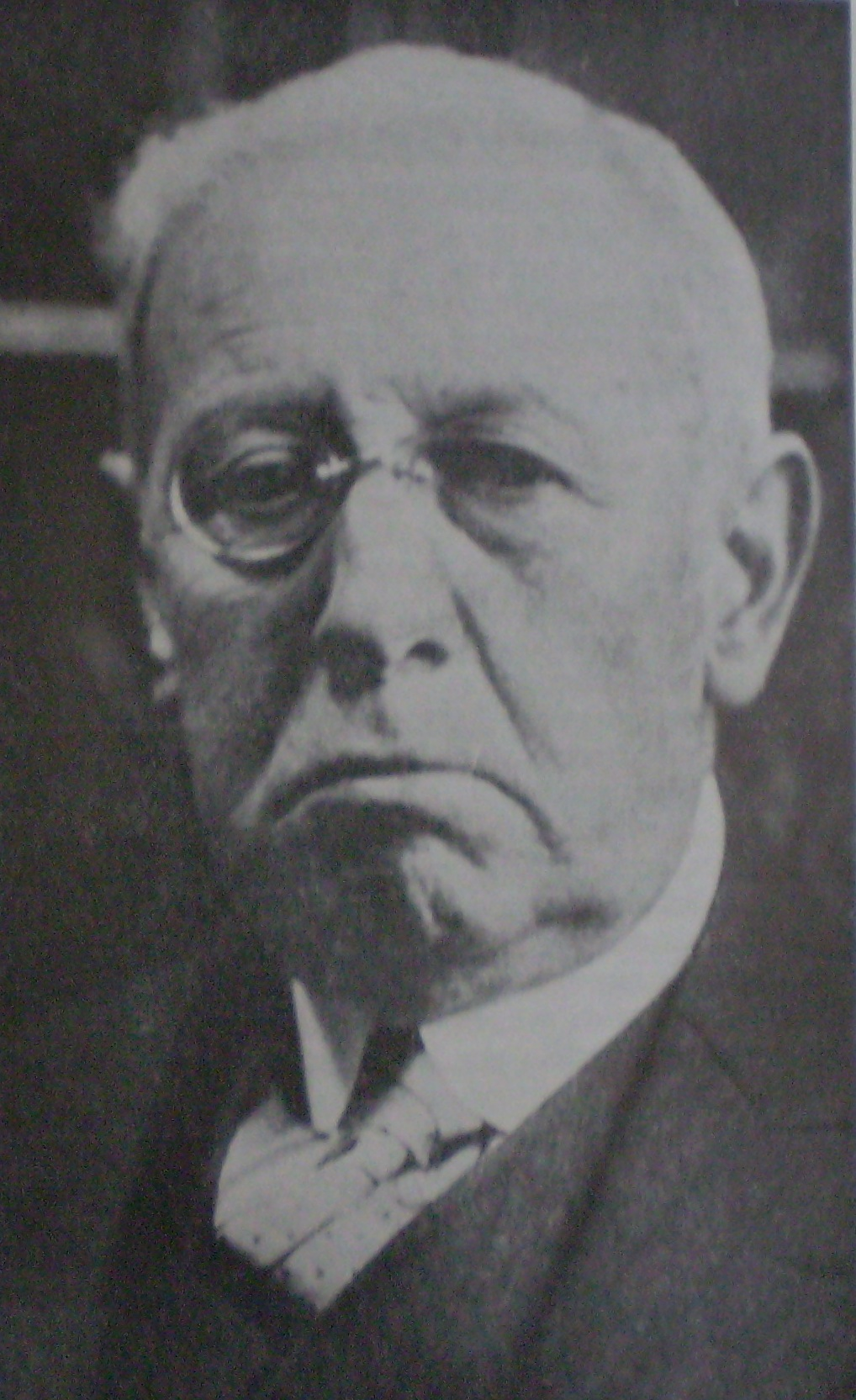

National Senator
- In office January 20, 1932 – January 3, 1936
- Constituency: Tucumán

Attorney General of Argentina
- In office November 27, 1917 – January 3, 1922
- President: Hipólito Yrigoyen
- Preceded by: Julio Botet
- Succeeded by: Horacio Rodríguez Larreta

Minister of the Interior
- In office October 12, 1922 – November 26, 1923
- President: Marcelo T. de Alvear
- Preceded by: Francisco Beiró
- Succeeded by: Vicente Gallo

Personal details
- Born: October 4, 1860 Tucumán, Argentina
- Died: January 3, 1936 (aged 75) Buenos Aires, Argentina
- Party: Radical Civic Union
- Education: University of Buenos Aires
- Profession: Lawyer, Academic, Politician

José Nicolás Matienzo (October 4, 1860 – January 3, 1936) was a prominent Argentine lawyer, writer, academic, and policy maker.

== Life and times ==
José Nicolás Matienzo was born in San Miguel de Tucumán, Argentina, in 1860. He enrolled at the University of Buenos Aires Law School, where he was mentored by Professor José Manuel Estrada, graduating with a juris doctor in 1882. The mercurial student began contributing articles and columns on a variety of subjects during law school, and continued in subsequent years. He was first appointed to public service as Legal Advisor to the Ministry of Public Works of Buenos Aires, in 1885. This experience earned him a seat on Emilio Mitre's Railroad Regulatory Commission, which contributed to the orderly and rapid development of rail transport in Argentina, after 1889. He then served as a civil court judge in La Plata, until 1890.

Maienzo had supported the paramount National Autonomist Party; but became disenchanted with it during President Miguel Juárez Celman's despotic 1886-90 rule. He provided legal advice to reform activists following the violently-suppressed Revolution of the Park (1890). Following a term in the Senate of the Province of Buenos Aires, during which he became well known for his defense of federalism, Matienzo returned to the University of Buenos Aires in 1904 as Professor of Philosophy and Letters. He was appointed dean of his school in 1906, and later established the Institute of Historical Research.

The reformist President José Figueroa Alcorta appointed Matienzo Minister of Labor in 1907. Accepting the post during a period of upheaval in the Argentine labor movement, he committed the bureau to accelerated labor law reform and ordered the publication of a bulletin detailing its activities. Continuing to teach he wrote the seminal Federal Representative Government in the Argentine Republic, in 1910. The text articulated his view as historian that Argentine politics would shift along roughly 18-year cycles and that reform could only evolve as quickly as the educational level of the public at large. He was later appointed Attorney General by the first democratically elected President of Argentina, Hipólito Yrigoyen. The president retained him during his entire 1916-22 term, though Matienzo developed differences with the increasingly autocratic Yrigoyen. This helped earn him the powerful post of Minister of the Interior (overseeing law enforcement) under Yrigoyen's successor, Marcelo Torcuato de Alvear, who removed almost all other high-level Yrigoyen appointees.

Matienzo retired from his professorship in 1927, when he accepted Socialist Party leader Juan B. Justo's invitation to join his ticket as a running mate. The decision to include the pragmatic Matienzo sparked a division in the party during their 1927 convention, however. Three months before the April 1928 election, Justo died unexpectedly, and Matienzo fared poorly. In 1932 the aging academic was elected to the Argentine Senate from his native Province of Tucumán, and he remained there until his death in 1936, at age 75.
