= Francisco Beiró =

Argentine politician

Francisco Beiró (19 September 1876 – 22 July 1928) was an Argentine politician and lawyer, who was elected to Vice President of Argentina with Hipólito Yrigoyen as President, but died before taking office. He was also National Deputy between 1918 and 1922 and Minister of Interior during the first presidency of Yrigoyen.

He was born in Rosario del Tala, Entre Ríos province. There is an avenue in Buenos Aires named in his honour in the neighborhood of Villa Devoto.
