= Lisandro de la Torre =

Argentine politician (1868–1939)

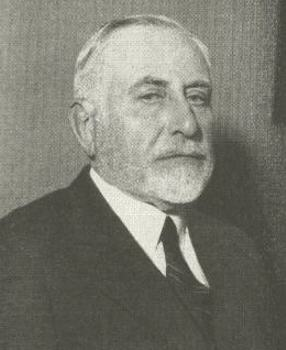

National Senator
- In office 20 February 1932 – 5 January 1937
- Constituency: Santa Fe

National Deputy
- In office 29 April 1922 – 29 April 1926
- Constituency: Santa Fe
- In office 29 April 1912 – 29 April 1916
- Constituency: Santa Fe

Provincial Deputy of Santa Fe
- In office 27 March 1911 – 1 June 1912
- Constituency: San Lorenzo Department

Personal details
- Born: 6 December 1868 Rosario, Argentina
- Died: 5 January 1939 (aged 70) Buenos Aires, Argentina
- Cause of death: Suicide by firearm
- Party: Radical Civic Union (1891–1897); Democratic Progressive Party (1914–1939)
- Education: University of Buenos Aires

Lisandro de la Torre (6 December 1868 – 5 January 1939) was an Argentine politician, born in Rosario, Santa Fe. He was and is considered as a paramount model of ethics in politics. He was a national deputy and senator, a prominent polemicist, and founder of the Democratic Progressive Party in 1914. He ran twice for the office of President, in 1916 and in 1931.

De la Torre became a lawyer in 1890. His thesis about municipalities and communes, as well as other works of his, gave rise to the idea of municipal autonomy in Argentina, which was included in the Argentine Constitution in the 1994 reform. In 1898 he founded the newspaper La República ("The Republic") in Rosario.

== Beginnings in politics ==
A member of the Radical Civic Union (Unión Cívica Radical, UCR) under the leadership of Leandro Alem, de la Torre abandoned the party in 1897 due to disagreement with the new leader, Hipólito Yrigoyen. Later, in 1908, he was part of the founding group of the Southern League (Liga del Sur), a local party. In 1911 he was elected for the provincial legislature representing the San Lorenzo Department; in 1912 he became a representative of Santa Fe (diputado) for the Southern League in the lower house of the National Congress.

On 14 December 1914 de la Torre took part of the constitutive assembly of the Democratic Progressive Party (Partido Demócrata Progresista, PDP) at the Hotel Savoy, Buenos Aires. The new party appointed him the presidential candidate for the 1916 elections, with Alejandro Carbó as the vice-president. The PDP was defeated by the UCR's candidate (H. Yrigoyen). De la Torre also lost the 1919 elections where he had presented as a candidate for senator representing the city of Buenos Aires.

De la Torre's PDP participated in the shaping of a new provincial constitution for Santa Fe, in 1921, which was considered modern and progressive for the time, but ended up being vetoed by the Radical governor Enrique Mosca.

De la Torre was elected national representative for Santa Fe in 1922. In 1925, however, he announced his retirement from active politics. In 1928 the PDP was overwhelmingly defeated in the province, which moved the wannabe-governor Francisco Correa to exclaim, "We are too few to win, but too many to disappear". In 1931 the PDP entered the Democratic-Socialist Alliance, which appointed De la Torre and Nicolás Repetto for the presidential elections, but they were defeated by Agustín Pedro Justo and Julio Argentino Pascual Roca.

== Work in the National Senate ==
In 1932 the PDP met triumph again when Luciano Molinas became the governor of Santa Fe. At the same time, de la Torre became a Democratic Progressive Party national senator. In 1935 he initiated an investigation on the meat trade, which had been previously attempted without success by his fellow party member Julio Noble. In the midst of the investigation, de la Torre's disciple, senator-elect Enzo Bordabehere, was murdered by Ramón Valdez Cora, and the province of Santa Fe was intervened. The bullet that killed Bordabehere, it is said, was destined for de la Torre. Valdez Cora was sentenced to 20 years of prison, of which he served 18. He was released in 1953, but died shortly after that, 18 months later. The murder was depicted by Juan José Jusid's 1984 film, Asesinato en el Senado de la Nación.

The debate had been caused by some protectionist laws, destined to protect the prices of grains, beef, wine, etc. De la Torre and two ministers exchanged insults until eventually the senator was challenged to a duel. He accepted the challenge of Federico Pinedo, Minister of Finance, but refused the duel with the Minister of Agriculture, Luis Duhau, since he did not consider Duhau a gentleman. Pinedo shot to kill, but missed, and de la Torre missed deliberately, so neither was injured, but reconciliation never came. De la Torre was a member of the Senate until 1937.

== De la Torre's death and legacy ==
Although some historians considered he was overwhelmed by his economic problems, it is generally agreed that Lisandro de la Torre was deeply saddened by Bordabehere's murder, as well as feeling disgusted and disheartened with the corruption and injustice prevalent in Argentina's politics at the time. He died by suicide after shooting himself in the heart with a revolver on 5 January 1939, in Buenos Aires. His ashes are now in an urn, buried in the El Salvador Cemetery of Rosario.

The Dr. Julio Marc Provincial Historical Museum, also in Rosario, displays a reproduction of de la Torre's residence in 22 Esmeralda St. of Buenos Aires, with the original furniture.

A meatpacking plant in Buenos Aires, famously the site of a major labor conflict in 1959, was named after him.

Today, a barrio (neighbourhood) in the north-east of the city (Barrio Lisandro de la Torre, also known as Arroyito, the home of the Rosario Central football club) carries his name, as well as a one-block street in the southern region, and many streets and avenues throughout Argentina.

A movie filmed in 1984, called Asesinato en el senado de la nación, dramatized the final days before the murder of Enzo Bordabehere. De la Torre was portrayed by Pepe Soriano; the movie was directed by Juan José Jusid.

== Bibliography ==
Works by Lisandro de la Torre include:

- Intermedio filosófico ("Philosophical intermission")
- Cuestiones monetarias y financieras ("Monetary and financial matters")
- Grandeza y decadencia del fascismo ("Greatness and decadence of fascism")
- Las dos campañas presidenciales ("The two presidential campaigns")
