= Independent Socialist Party (Argentina) =

Political party in Argentina

Independent Socialist Party Partido Socialista Independiente
- Abbreviation: PSI
- Leader: Antonio de Tomaso and Federico Pinedo
- Founded: 1927
- Dissolved: 1943
- Split from: Socialist Party
- Succeeded by: Independent Party; National Democratic Party
- Ideology: Socialism (de jure); Conservatism; Economic liberalism
- Political position: Centre-right
- National affiliation: Concordancia
- Colors: Red

The Independent Socialist Party was a political party in Argentina that was founded in 1927 as a split from the Socialist Party. It united socialists, who opposed openly the radical president Hipólito Yrigoyen and participated in his overthrow in 1930 in a military coup. The new party joined Concordancia in 1931 along with conservatives and "antipersonalist" radicals. The alliance maintained power until 1943 with the help of voter fraud. The Independent Socialist Party held several important positions, in particular the minister of economy Federico Pinedo Jr. and the minister of agriculture Antonio De Tomaso. The party disappeared in the second half of the 1930s. The PSI has been criticized for being in effect a right-wing conservative party that drifted away from socialism.

== Bibliography ==
- Azaretto, Roberto (1998). Federico Pinedo: político y economista. Buenos Aires: Emecé. Federico Pinedo, político y economista consultado
- Sanguinetti, Horacio (1987) Los socialistas independientes. Buenos Aires: CEAL.
- Santillán, Fernando (2005). Antonio de Tomaso, diputado socialista (1914-1926); tesis de maestría. Buenos Aires: Universidad Torcuato Di Tella, 2005.
- Troncoso, Oscar (1971). «El plan de Pinedo». Revista Panorama. Abril (1971).
