= José Félix Uriburu =

17th President of Argentina (1868–1932)

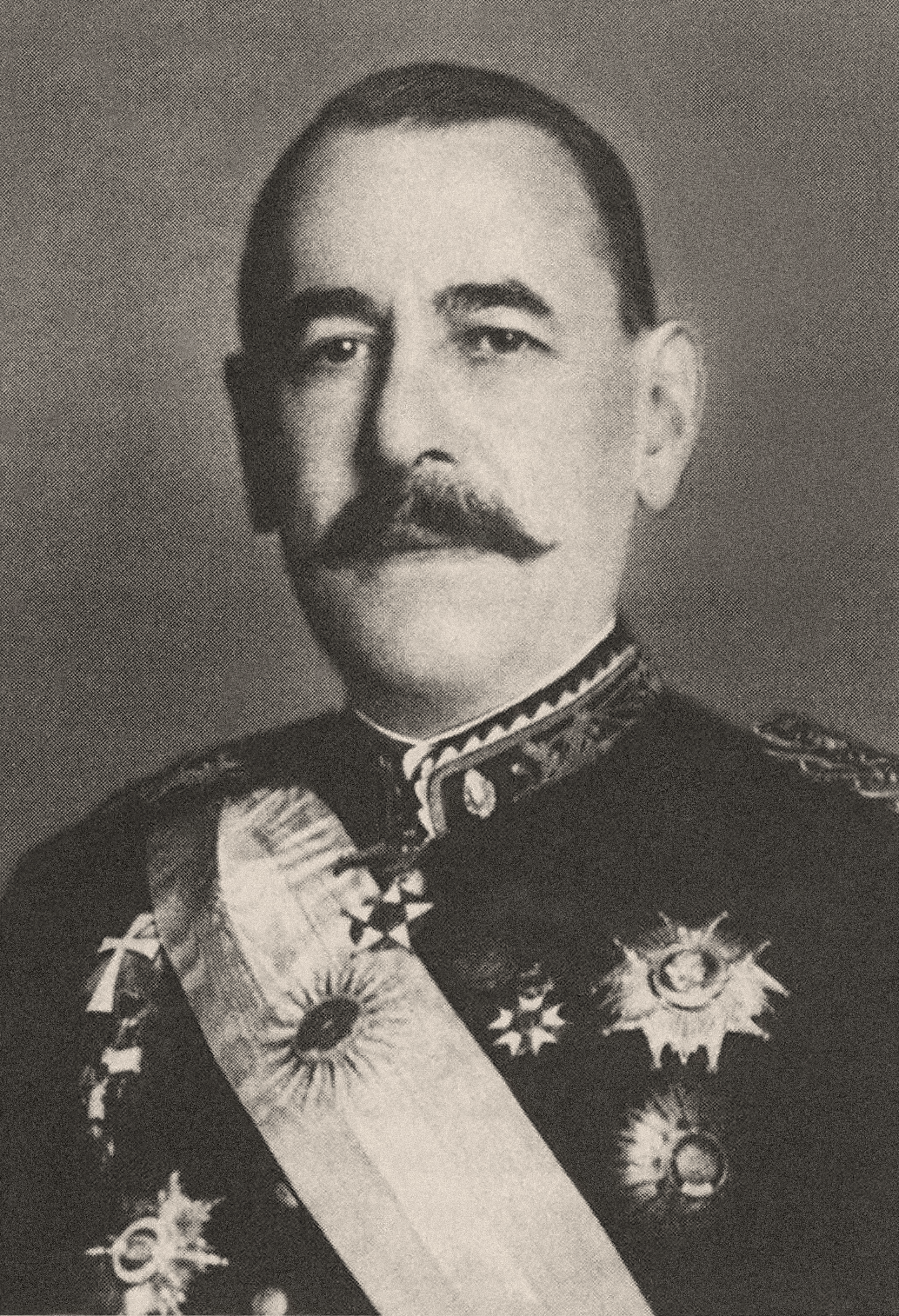

22nd President of Argentina
- In office 6 September 1930 – 20 February 1932
- Vice President: Enrique Santamarina (1930); None (1930–1932)
- Preceded by: Hipólito Yrigoyen
- Succeeded by: Agustín P. Justo

Personal details
- Born: 20 July 1868 Salta, Argentina
- Died: 29 April 1932 (aged 63) Paris, France
- Party: Argentine Civic Legion
- Spouse: Aurelia Madero Buján
- Profession: Military

Military service
- Allegiance: Argentina
- Branch/service: Argentine Army
- Years of service: 1890–1932
- Rank: Lieutenant General
- José Félix Uriburu's voice Uriburu's speech overthrowing Hipolito Yrigoyen (recorded 1930)

José Félix Benito Uriburu (20 July 1868 – 29 April 1932) was an Argentine military officer and politician, he was the President of the Provisional Government of Argentina, ousting the successor to President Hipólito Yrigoyen by means of a military coup and declaring himself president. From 6 September 1930 to 20 February 1932, he controlled both the Executive and Legislative branches of government. As "President of the Provisional Government," he acted as the de facto Head of state of Argentina. His was the first of a series of successful coups d'état and unconstitutional governments that came to power in 1943, 1955, 1962, 1966, and 1976.

Uriburu's coup was supported by the Nacionalistas, a far-right Argentine nationalist movement that around 1910 grew out of the "traditionalist" position, which was based on nostalgia for feudal economic relations and a more "organic" social order.

In the aftermath of the coup, major changes to Argentine politics and government took place, with Uriburu banning political parties, suspending elections, and suspending the 1853 Constitution. Uriburu proposed that Argentina be reorganized along corporatist and fascist lines.

== Biography ==
Uriburu was born on 20 July 1868 in Salta to José de Uriburu y Poveda and Serafina de Uriburu y Álvarez de Arenales, who were cousins. He was also the nephew of President José Evaristo Uriburu and a descent of Juan Antonio Álvarez de Arenales, a general in the Spanish American wars of independence. According to genealogist Narciso Binayán Carmona, he was descended from Spanish conquistador Domingo Martínez de Irala. On 17 March 1885, he entered the Colegio Militar de la Nación as a cadet. With the rank of sublieutenant, he was one of the 33 officers that participated in the organization of the Revolution of the Park in 1890.

On 19 November 1894, he married Aurelia Madero Buján (1873–1959), the daughter of Eduardo Madero and Marcelina Buján Ellauri, with whom he had three children: Alberto Eduardo, Elena, Teresa, and Marta Mercedes. He served as an assistant to his uncle José Uriburu and to president Luis Sáenz Peña. In 1905, he supported President Manuel Quintana in the suppression of the Radical Revolution of 1905. In 1907, he became the director of the Superior School of War and was later sent to Germany for three years to perfect his training program. When he returned to Buenos Aires, he attended the scientific conventions for the Centennial celebrations and later took the command of Chief of Staff in the Argentine borderlands. In 1913, he returned to Europe as a military attaché to Germany and the United Kingdom. When he returned to Argentina in 1914, he was elected to the Argentine National Congress. In 1921, he ascended to the rank of Division General, and the following year was appointed inspector general of the army by Marcelo Torcuato de Alvear. He was a member of the Supreme Council of War until 1926, when Yrigoyen forced him to retire for having reached the age of retirement.

== 1930 coup d'etat ==
=== Economic crisis ===
The world economic crisis in 1929, known as the Great Depression, had a profound impact on Argentina. It primarily affected the economy, since 80% of its revenue came from foreign trade. The crisis created a situation of social tension, with decreases in salary and increases in unemployment. This economic unrest created the political context for the 1930 coup. This crisis of democratic systems was seen throughout all of Latin America.

Furthermore, the social teachings of the Catholic Church at the time were based in the 1891 encyclical Rerum novarum, which dealt with the conditions of the working class, made clear the church's support for workers' unions, reaffirmed its support for the right to private property, and discussed relations between the government, corporations, workers, and the Church, proposing a socioeconomic relationship which later became known as corporatism.

=== Corporatist doctrines ===
The nationalist ideologies that arose from the rise to power of Italy's Benito Mussolini, who supported the introduction of corporatism, created a division within the People's Party and its eventual dissolution. It was then that the Catholic nationalists supported the publication La Nueva República, a newspaper opposed to the radical government of Hipólito Yrigoyen, who was harshly criticized for a series of federal interventions and for his government's ties to assassinating opposition leaders, such as Senator Lencinas, which produced a weakening of the democracy and led to the military coup led by general José Félix Uriburu.

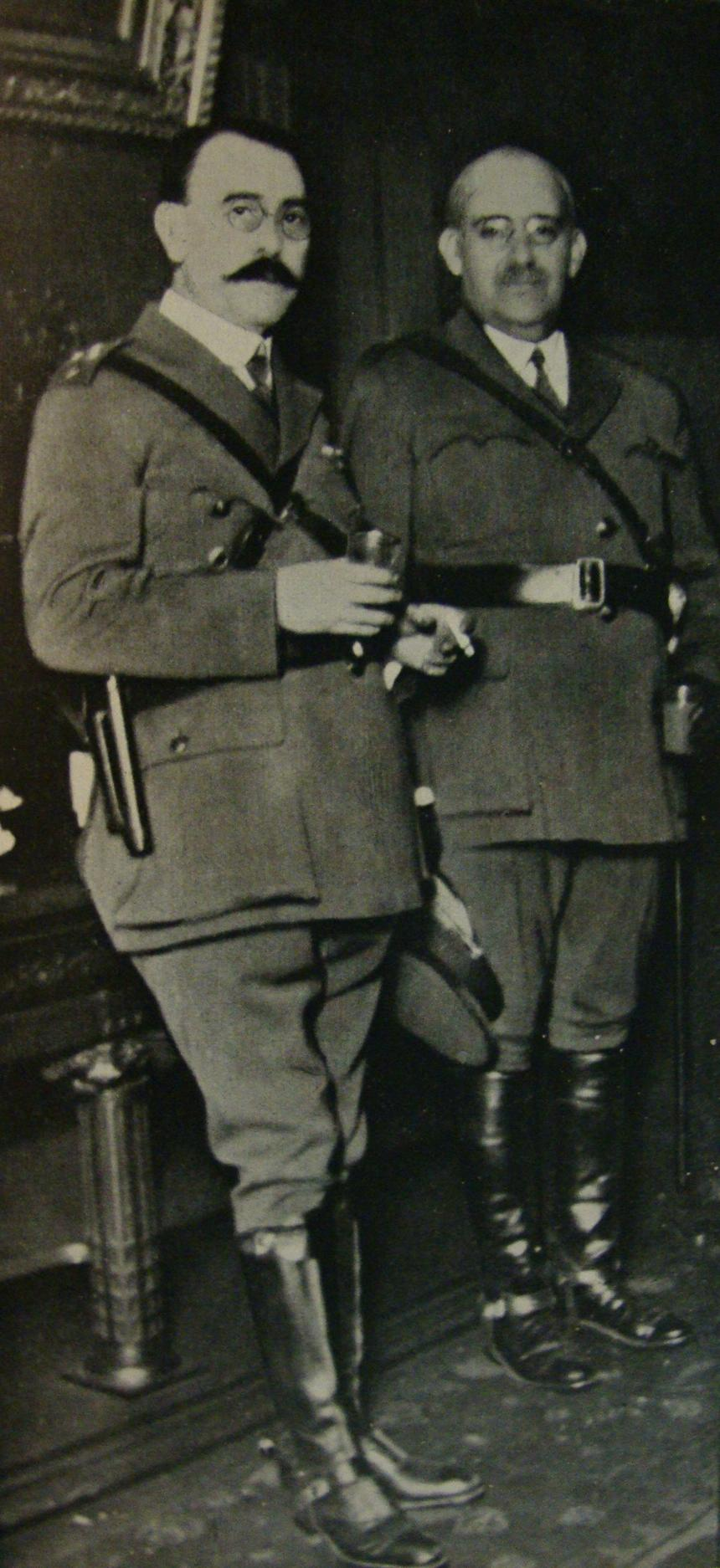
José Félix Uriburu and Agustín Pedro Justo

=== 6 September 1930 uprising ===
On 6 September 1930, Uriburu staged a coup d'état that overthrew the constitutional government of Hipólito Yrigoyen and established a military dictatorship, the first of several that lasted until 1983. At the time, Uriburu essentially represented Catholic neo-corporatist nationalism. Plans rooted in this ideology included a system in which there would be corporate chamber with representation from unions and businesses, and another chamber with political representation. It could be said that this ideology was rooted in the Catholic nationalism which had been on the rise in Argentina since the 1920s.

The coup d'état that came to power was unprecedented in the modern history of Argentina. According to Argentine philosopher Mario Bunge, the 1930 military coup ended a half-century-long period of internal peace and ongoing economic, political, and cultural progress in the country. It was also the first time that fascism rose its head in the continent; the first time in the history of the country that the Armed Forces took political power; the first time since the Tragic Week of 1919 and the repression of the Patagonia Rebelde of 1922 that the government assassinated union members; and the first time since the end of Rosas' dictatorship that the Catholic Church had meddled in politics, this time with a distinctly fascist orientation.

Uriburu entrusted poet Leopoldo Lugones with the task of writing the revolutionary proclamation, although the first version was accused of being fascist by Colonel José María Sarobe and General Agustín P. Justo, who represented the traditional conservative liberalism in Argentina. Lugones therefore had to modify the proclamation. The proclamation read:

The Army and Navy of the Fatherland, responding to the unanimous fervor of the people of the Nation and the urgent purposes that the duty of the Argentines imposes upon us in this solemn hour for the fate of the country, have resolved to raise the flag in order to cut ties with the men of the government, who have betrayed the trust of the people and of the Republic, and demand the immediate discharge of their command, which they no longer execute for the common good, but for their personal desires. We therefore notify you categorically that they no longer have the support of the armed forces, whose primary objective is to defend personal respect, which they have compromised, and there will no longer be in our ranks a single man who will uprise against his comrade to defend a cause that has become the shame of the Nation. We also notify you that we will not tolerate last-minute maneuvers or communications that hope to save a government repudiated by public opinion or keep in power the remains of a political conglomeration that is strangling the Republic.

== Military government ==
On 10 September 1930, Uriburu was recognized as President of the Nation by means of an infamous and controversial ruling by the Supreme Court, which gave rise to the De facto government doctrine. This doctrine legitimized the new government, "as long as it executes the administrative and political function derived from its possession of the force as guarantee of order and social security." He dissolved the National Congress, declared a state of siege, replaced the governors of the provinces with radical governors through federal intervention, and attempted to establish a neo-corporatist government. In this system of government, similar to fascism, Uriburu saw an example of peace and political order. On 18 September 1930, the ambassadors from the United States and England (a country Uriburu had served as an attaché), recognized his provisional government.

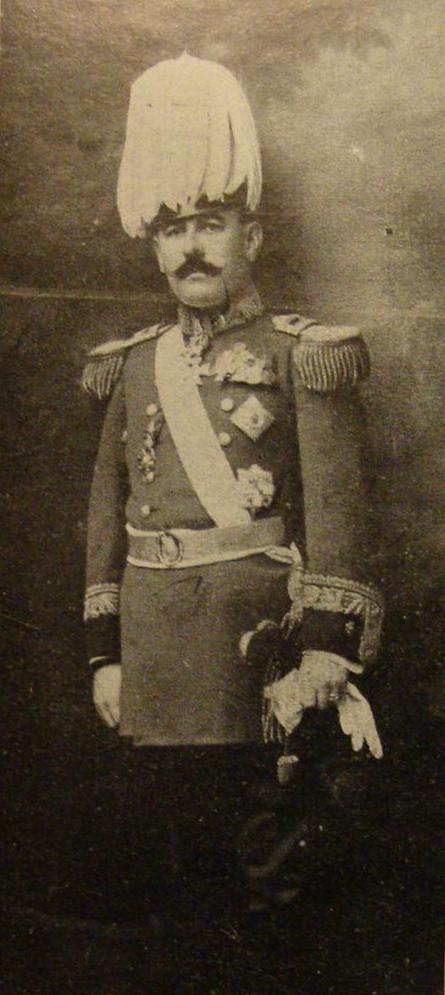
A young José Félix Uriburu wearing an old-style Gala uniform as a brigadier (taken before 1921)

Though Uriburu publicly claimed to respect the Constitution, he personally felt that it was necessary to return the country to the rule of a conservative government as was the case prior to the Law of Sáenz Peña, which had established a secret vote for all men over 18. In a speech given to the Superior School of War, Uriburu expressed his opposition to universal suffrage:

We must try to achieve a political authority based in reality rather than purely theory... Aristotle defined democracy as a government by those best fit to rule. The difficulty is in making those who are best fit the rulers. It is difficult to make that happen in any country where, like ours, there is a 60% illiteracy rate, therefore it is clear and evident that it is those 60% that govern the country, because in legal elections, they are the majority.

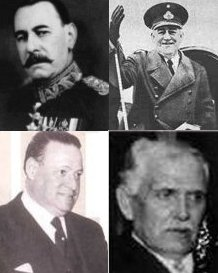
The four Argentine presidents of the Infamous Decade: José Félix Uriburu, Agustín P. Justo, Roberto Ortiz, and Ramón Castillo

He established a repressive regime that included for the first time the systematic use of torture against political opponents, particularly anarchists, communists, and radical yrigoyenists, using the Sector of Public Order of the Capital Police, with Leopoldo Lugones, Jr. at the helm. He declared martial law and executed anarchist militants such as Severino Di Giovanni, Gregorio Galeano, José Gatti, Joaquín Penina, Paulino Scarfó and Jorge Tamayo Gavilán. He imprisoned several political leaders, such as former president Hipólito Yrigoyen; censured news publications; and took over the nation's universities, eliminating the autonomy and co-government that they had enjoyed since the University Reform of 1918. Once the coup had taken place, the newly founded General Confederation of Labor (CGT) adopted an attitude of complacency towards the military regime.

In the economic sphere, the Great Depression had an impact on the country and caused a significant decrease in revenue, a decline in consumption, and an increase in unemployment. In the political sphere, Uriburu attempted a highly repressive model of government, with martial law and military courts to try civilians who opposed the de facto government. His idea was to establish a corporative regime in the style of Italian fascist Benito Mussolini, but the result of the elections demonstrated that it did not have popular support and he was unable to follow through with the plan.

In early 1931, he called elections in the Province of Buenos Aires, but later annulled them after the Radical Civic Union (UCR) won. In November of that year, he again called elections after prohibiting UCR candidates and organizing a system that was broadly recognized as fraudulent, marking the beginning of the so-called Infamous Decade in Argentina. It was under these conditions that General Agustín P. Justo was elected president, representing the party that had earlier been wiped out by the Sáenz Peña Law.

In March 1931, Uriburu received Edward Windsor, then prince of Wales and later King Edward VIII, with whom he visited the Campo de Mayo, the National Hippodrome, and the seaside resort of Mar del Plata to inaugurate the British Exposition of Arts and Industries at La Rural.

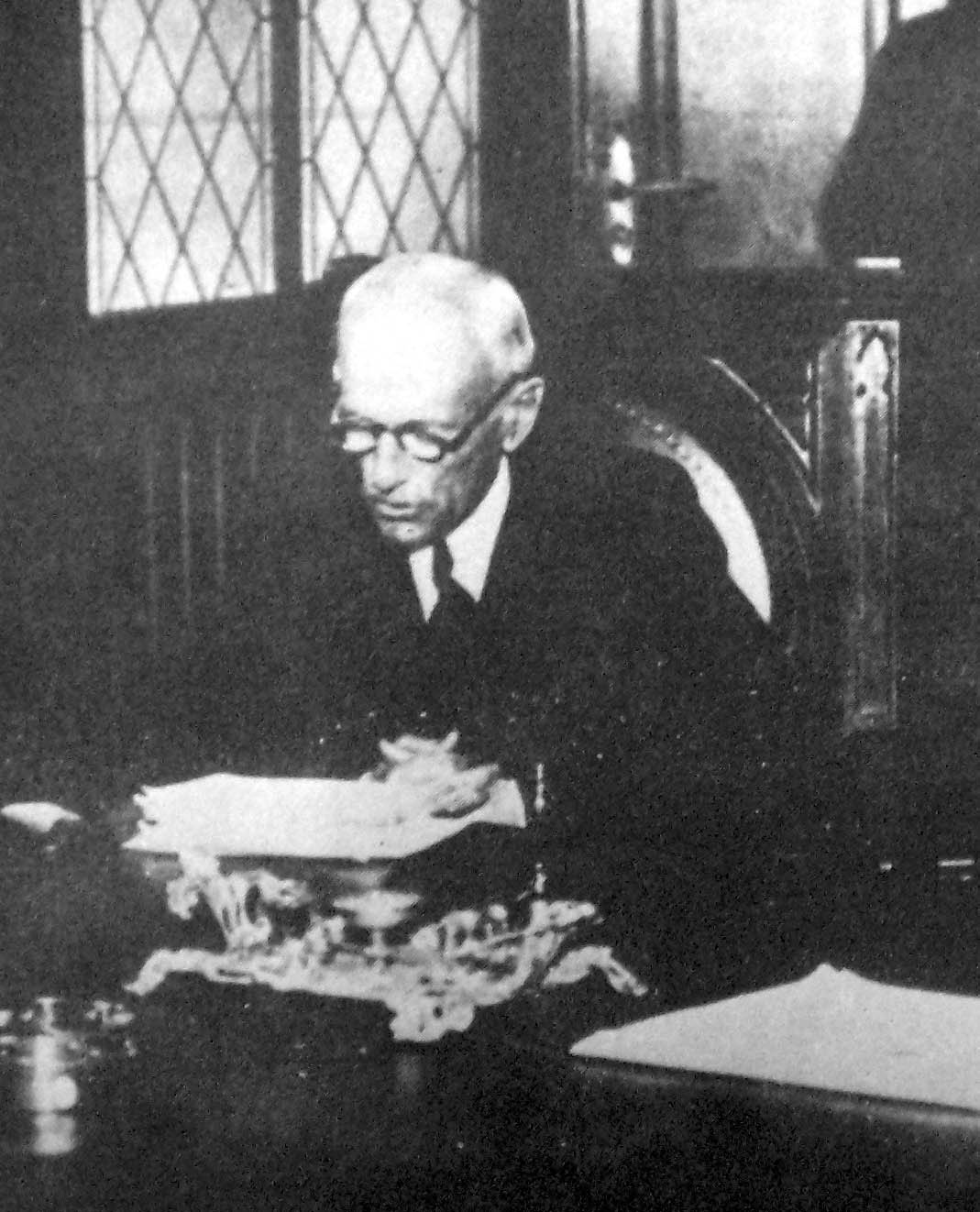
Ernesto Bosch, Minister of Foreign Affairs under President Uriburu

== Cabinet ==
Cabinet of Ministers
Ministry	Minister	Period
Ministry of the Interior	Matías Sánchez Sorondo Octavio Sergio Pico	6 September 1930 – 15 April 1931 April 6, 1931 – 20 February 1932
Ministry of Foreign Affairs and Worship	Ernesto Bosch Adolfo Bioy	6 September 1930 – 9 October 1931 October 9, 1931 – 20 February 1932
Ministry of the Treasury	Enrique Simón Pérez Enrique Uriburu	6 September 1930 – 16 April 1931 April 17, 1931 – 20 February 1932
Ministry of Justice and Public Instruction	Ernesto Padilla Guillermo Rothe	6 September 1930 – 15 April 1931 April 16, 1931 – 20 February 1932
Ministry of Agriculture	Horacio Beccar Varela David Arias	6 September 1930 – 15 April 1931 April 16, 1931 – 20 February 1932
Ministry of Public Works	Octavio Sergio Pico Pablo Calatayud	6 September 1930 – 16 April 1931 April 17, 1931 – 20 February 1932
Ministry of War	Francisco Medina	6 September 1930 – 20 February 1932
Ministry of the Navy	Abel Renard Carlos G. Daireaux	6 September 1930 – 16 April 1931 April 17, 1931 – 20 February 1932

== Death ==
After turning his power over to Agustín P. Justo, he left the country for health reasons and died in Paris two months later after undergoing surgery for stomach cancer. His body was later repatriated and buried at the Recoleta Cemetery.

== Removal of memorials ==
During the 20th century, several busts and memorial were created and streets named in the dictator's honor, many during de facto governments. However, during the 21st century, these monuments have been removed and the streets renamed.

In the city of San Carlos de Bolívar, there was a bust of Uriburu in Las Acollaradas Park, but in 2012 the city council voted to remove it. In the city of Balcarce, there is still a monument on Avenida Favaloro, previously named Avenida Uriburu. While the City Council approved its removal in 2014, the monument still remains. Until 2015, there was a bust of Uriburu in Park Mitre in the city of Olavarría just a few meters from the Monument to Liberty erected by the French. It was removed in 1966 and kept in a municipal warehouse. Later, the municipal leader Enrique Mario Alfieri, put in by de facto President Juan Carlos Onganía, placed it on his desk, and in 1973, another conservative municipal leader, Juan Ángel Moya, this time put in by de facto President Roberto M. Levingston, returned the bust to the park, just before that year's 11 March Democratic Elections. In January 2019, the bust was removed after city council approval.

Political offices
Preceded by Hipólito Yrigoyen	President of Argentina; 1930–1932	Succeeded by Agustín P. Justo
