= Democratic Progressive Party (Argentina) =

Political party in Argentina

Democratic Progressive Party Partido Demócrata Progresista
- Abbreviation: PDP
- General Secretary: Ana Copes
- Founder: Lisandro de la Torre
- Founded: 14 December 1914
- Preceded by: Liga del Sur
- Headquarters: Entre Ríos 1443, Rosario, Santa Fe
- Ideology: Liberalism
- Political position: Center-right to right-wing
- National affiliation: Juntos por el Cambio
- Seats in the Chamber of Deputies of Santa Fe: 1 / 50
- Seats in the Senate of Santa Fe: 0 / 19

Website
- www.pdp.org.ar

The Democratic Progressive Party (Spanish: Partido Demócrata Progresista) is a political party in Argentina, principally active in Santa Fe.

== History ==
Following the adoption of the Sáenz Peña Law (which established universal and compulsory suffrage for native-born male citizens) in 1912, the conservative elite that had ruled Argentina saw itself in need of a strong, centralized and organic party in order to compete against the growing threat of the Radical Civic Union and the Socialist Party. As a response to this need, the PDP was founded by Santa Fe senator Lisandro de la Torre at the Savoy Hotel in Buenos Aires on December 14, 1914. It was made up of members of eight different provincial conservative parties. However, the conservative elite of Buenos Aires Province, the largest and wealthiest in the country, were not convinced by the reformist profile De la Torre had imprinted onto the new party, and so they boycotted the PDP, leaving it unable to group the entirety of the conservative elite.

In the 1983 election, the Democratic Progressive Party made an alliance with the Socialist Democratic Party by proposing the presidential ticket of Martínez Raymonda - René Balestra, obtaining 0.32% of the vote, without obtaining parliamentary representation.
