= Argentina during World War II =

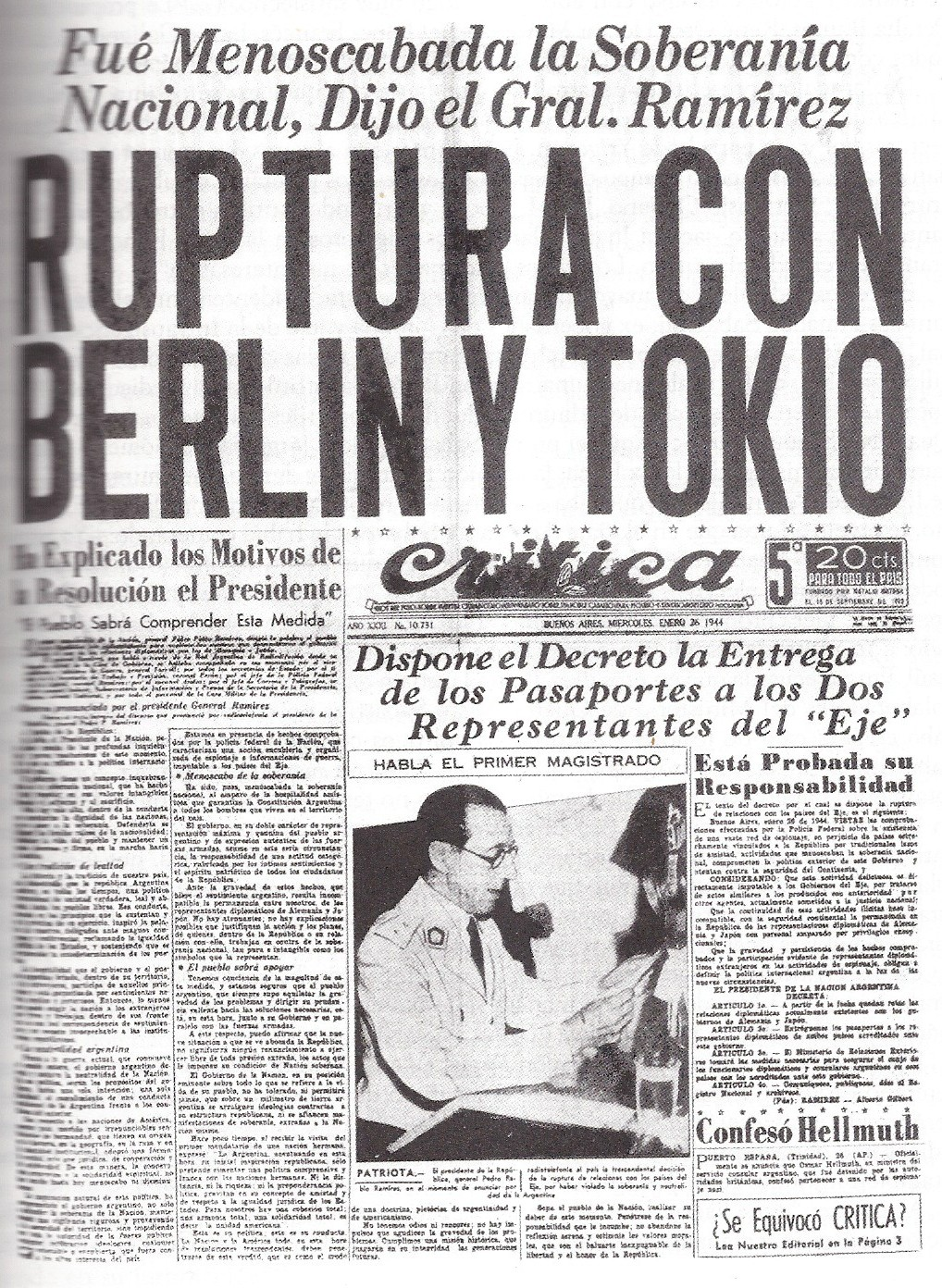
- A newspaper announcing Argentina's severing of diplomatic relations with the Axis powers on 26 January 1944.
- Location: Argentina
- Date: 1939–1945
- Events: Battle of the River Plate (13 December 1939); Operation Bolivar begins (May 1940); Revolution of '43 (4 June 1943); Hellmuth Incident (4 November 1943); Severing of relations (26 January 1944); Declaration of war (27 March 1945); U-530 Incident (10 July 1945); U-977 incident (17 August 1945)

Since the 19th century, relations between Argentina and Britain had been strong due to trade, as well as British investments and immigration. Nationalistic groups resented this influence over Argentina's economy. In the interwar years, fascist Italian and German influence in the country increased due to trade, investment, and the presence of numerous immigrants from both countries.

The refusal to break relations with the Axis powers as the war progressed furthered the belief that Argentina was sympathetic to them. Because of strong divisions and internal disputes within the Argentine military, Argentina remained neutral for most of World War II, despite pressure from the United States to join the Allies. Argentina eventually gave in to the Allies' pressure, breaking relations with the Axis on 26 January 1944 and declaring war on them on 27 March 1945.

The Nazis had a presence in the country as early as 1925, growing to a peak of 2,110 party members in 1935 before officially dissolving in 1939. Afterwards, Buenos Aires was a major center of Axis espionage under the guise of German labor organizations and with support from the United Officers' Group. Argentine, Chilean, and U.S. agencies shut down some local spy networks, but pro-Nazi activity occurred as late as 1950 under Juan Perón, allowing perhaps 5,000 collaborators to escape there.

== Pre-war political and economic background ==
=== 19th century–World War I ===
Argentina maintained a long tradition of neutrality regarding European wars, upheld and defended by all major political parties since the 19th century. One of the main reasons for this policy was related to Argentina's economic position as one of the world's leading exporters of foodstuffs and agricultural products, to Europe in general and to the United Kingdom in particular.

Relations between Britain and Argentina had been strong since the mid-19th century, due to the large volume of trade between both countries, the major presence of British investments particularly in railroads and banking, as well as British immigration, and the policy of neutrality had ensured the food supply of Britain during World War I against the German U-boat campaign.

=== Before the Great Depression ===
In 1916, following the enactment of universal and secret male suffrage by conservative president Roque Saenz Peña, the voting franchise was expanded, and electoral transparency improved, leading to the first truly free presidential elections in the country. As a result of these electoral changes, Hipólito Yrigoyen, leader of the centrist Radical Civic Union (UCR), was elected President of Argentina. Under the successive administrations of presidents Yrigoyen (1916–1922) and Marcelo Torcuato de Alvear (1922–1928), Argentina continued the trend of strong economic growth and democratic consolidation that had begun under previous administrations, matching countries such as Canada or Australia in per capita income, while the government enacted social and economic reforms and extended assistance to small farms and businesses. Beginning in 1928, Yrigoyen's second administration faced a crippling economic crisis, precipitated by the Great Depression (1929–1939).

=== 1930 military coup ===
In 1930, Yrigoyen was ousted from power by the military led by José Félix Uriburu, in what became the first military coup in modern Argentine history, marking the beginning of what would be later called the Infamous Decade in Argentina.

Supported by nationalistic sectors of the military, Uriburu tried to implement major changes to Argentine politics and government, banning political parties and suspending both elections and the 1853 Constitution, aiming to reorganizing Argentina along corporatist and fascist lines. However, Uriburu's policies would face widespread opposition from civil society and from conservative factions of the military, and only a year later, in 1931, he was forced to step down. Thus, in November 1931, the military government called for elections, but only after banning UCR candidates and organizing a system that was broadly recognized as fraudulent. It was under these conditions that General Agustín P. Justo was elected president.

=== Presidency of Agustín P. Justo ===
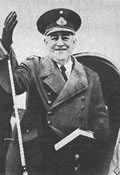
General Agustín P. Justo

Elected on 8 November 1931, Justo was supported by a newly created conservative party known as Concordancia, which was born as an alliance between the National Democratic Party, dissident sectors of the Radical Civic Union that had opposed Hipólito Yrigoyen, and the Independent Socialist Party. Still reeling from the aftermath of the Great Depression, Justo's government at first undertook fiscally conservative economic policies, reducing public expenditure and restricting the circulation of currency in an attempt to strengthen the public coffers. However, as in other countries during this period, Keynesian ideas were eventually implemented, and more emphasis was placed on public works and infrastructure, resulting in the creation of the National Office of Public Highways, expansion of the road network, creation of the Junta Nacional de Granos (National Grain Board) and the Junta Nacional de Carnes (National Meat Board), and, in 1935, creation of the Central Bank of the Argentine Republic, under the advice of economist Otto Niemeyer.

In foreign policy, the most pressing issue of the Justo administration was the restoration of international trade, which had collapsed following the Great Depression. As a byproduct of Black Tuesday and the Wall Street crash of 1929, Great Britain, principal economic partner of Argentina in the 1920s and 1930s, had taken measures to protect the meat supply market in the Commonwealth. At the 1932 Imperial Conference negotiations in Ottawa, bowing to pressure, mainly from Australia and South Africa, Britain had decided to severely curtail imports of Argentine beef. The plan provoked an immediate outcry in Buenos Aires, and the Argentine government dispatched Vice President Julio Argentino Pascual Roca and a team of negotiators to London. As a result of these negotiations, on 1 May 1933, the bilateral treaty known as the Roca–Runciman Treaty was signed between Argentina and the United Kingdom, which guaranteed Argentina a beef export quota that was equivalent to the levels sold in 1932, in exchange for Argentina reducing tariffs on almost 350 British goods to 1930 rates and to refrain from imposing duties on coal, strengthening the commercial ties between Argentina and Britain and ensuring a trade surplus during the turmoil of the Great Depression, but drawing ire from nationalistic sectors and several opposition senators, including the denunciations of liberal Senator Lisandro de la Torre, who claimed that Britain received the most benefits from the treaty. Ratified by the Argentine Senate, the Roca–Runciman Treaty lasted three years and was renewed for another three years as the Eden-Malbrán Treaty of 1936. Argentina under Justo would also rejoin the League of Nations, and hold state visits to presidents Getúlio Vargas of Brazil and Gabriel Terra of Uruguay, signing commercial treaties with those nations. Justo's foreign minister, Carlos Saavedra Lamas would also serve an important role as a mediator in the Chaco War between Bolivia and Paraguay, helping both countries reach a peace deal, thus winning the 1936 Nobel Peace Prize.

=== Mounting political tensions ===
In the aftermath of the 1930 military coup and the subsequent accusations of electoral fraud against Justo, political tensions in Argentina would remain high throughout the 1930s. On 5 April 1931, supporters of deposed president Yrigoyen won the elections for governor in Buenos Aires Province, but the government of Uriburu declared the elections invalid. On December, facing uprisings by UCR supporters, Justo decreed a state of siege, and again imprisoned the old Yrigoyen, as well as Alvear, Ricardo Rojas, Honorio Pueyrredón, and other leading figures of the party.

In 1933, attempted revolts continued. The provinces of Buenos Aires, Corrientes, Entre Ríos, and Misiones would be the stage of UCR uprisings, which ended with more than a thousand people being detained. Seriously ill, Yrigoyen was returned to Buenos Aires and kept under house arrest. He died on 3 June, and his burial in La Recoleta Cemetery was the occasion of a mass demonstration. In December, during a meeting of the national convention of the UCR, a joint uprising by the military and politicians broke loose in Santa Fe, Rosario, and Paso de los Libres. José Benjamin Abalos, who was Yrigoyen's former Minister, and Colonel Roberto Bosch were arrested during the uprising and the organizers and leaders of the party were imprisoned at Martín García. Former President Marcelo Torcuato de Alvear was exiled by the government, while others were detained in the penitentiary in Ushuaia.

In 1935, Alvear was allowed to return from exile as part of a gentlemen's agreement with Justo, with Alvear promising there would be no more violent rebellions in exchange for Justo promising an end to fraudulent elections. Thus Alvear took on leadership of the UCR party, vowing that the UCR would once again take part in elections and to continue the fight against fraudulent practices. That same year, once again amid accusations of fraud, the Justo administration managed to secure the victory of its candidate Manuel Fresco for governor of Buenos Aires Province, but it could not avoid the UCR victory of Amadeo Sabattini for governor in Córdoba, despite bloody incidents that aimed at disrupting the election. Meanwhile, the province of Santa Fe, under the leadership of opposition Democratic Progressive Party governor Luciano Molinas, was the subject of a federal intervention by the national government.

In 1937, presidential elections were to be held. Alvear, together with his running mate Enrique Mosca campaigned across the country, vowing that "not even fraud could defeat them". Meanwhile, the ruling Concordancia party, nominated lawyer Roberto Marcelino Ortiz, from the dissident anti-Yrigoyen UCR faction, as presidential candidate, with conservative lawmaker Ramón Castillo, as his running mate. The 1937 presidential elections were held in September. Completely flouting on his promise, Justo kept his political and security forces busy on election day. Amid widespread reports of intimidation, ballot stuffing and voter roll tampering (whereby, according to one observer, "democracy was extended to the hereafter"), Ortiz won the elections handily.

== Beginning of the war ==
=== Political situation ===
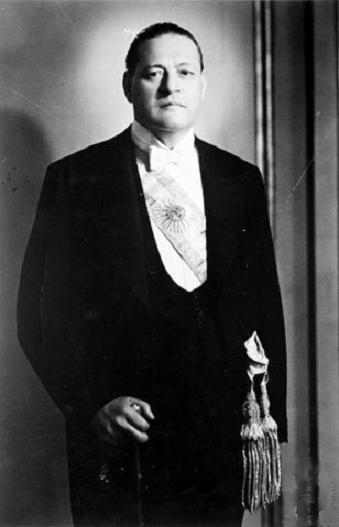
Roberto M. Ortiz came to power through the system of electoral fraud, but soon after taking office he tried to dismantle it.

Despite winning the presidency in 1937 in a process that was widely recognized as fraudulent by both the government and the opposition, by 1939 Ortiz's government had made democratic normalization a priority of its agenda. To achieve this aim, the administration resorted to federal interventions, but in the opposite way that these had been used under Justo, intervening those provinces where governors had won by proven fraud (namely San Juan, Santiago del Estero, Catamarca and Buenos Aires), while respecting the results and autonomy in those provinces with no irregularities, including those where elections had been won by the opposition UCR, such as the cases of Tucumán (October 1938 and March 1939) as well as Córdoba (March 1940). In 1940, legislative elections were held in a clean fashion, giving the opposition UCR a majority in Congress. This policy of democratic restoration would soon put the administration of Ortiz at odds with the more conservative factions of his own ruling Concordancia party, including conservative vice-president Ramón Castillo.

The opposition UCR, in turn, was divided between FORJA, a political grouping that consisted of hardline supporters of deposed UCR president Hipólito Yrigoyen (who died in 1933) and opposed any form of cooperation with the government, and the majoritarian faction of the UCR under the official leadership of Alvear, who, while also remaining in opposition to the government, soon adopted a more conciliary tone to the Ortiz administration as a result of these changes. The two other major parties, the Socialist Party and the liberal Democratic Progressive Party would also remain in opposition to the government. Meanwhile, the Communist Party, also staunchly opposed to the government, initially followed a policy of courting the trade unions, and gave priority to supporting the international stance of the Soviet Union.

Economically, recovery from the Great Depression had been underway since 1933, but the beginning of the war resulted in changes to the Argentine economy, as imports from Europe were reduced. Thus began a process of import substitution industrialization, which had some antecedents during the Great Depression. This led to a process of internal migration as well, with people living in the countryside or in small villages moving to urban centers.

=== Initial diplomatic reaction ===
At the beginning of the Second World War on 1 September 1939, the Argentine government proclaimed its neutrality in the conflict. On 3 September, the diplomatic representatives of the United Kingdom and France informed the Argentine government that their countries had entered a state of war against Nazi Germany. Following the initial policies of other states in the Americas, the Ortiz government issued a decree on 4 September 1939, declaring Argentine neutrality in the conflict. To enforce the observance of neutrality, on 14 September 1939, Ortiz issued a second presidential decree, creating a special commission integrated by representatives from each ministry, housed on the Ministry of Foreign Affairs and chaired by a delegate from this ministry.

=== Battle of the River Plate ===
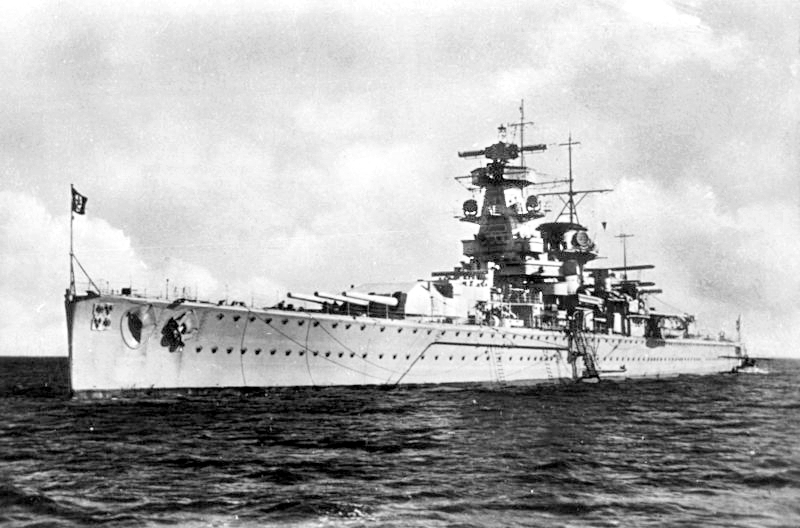
The German pocket battleship Admiral Graf Spee took part in the Battle of the River Plate, and was scuttled by her captain after being damaged in combat.

On 13 December 1939, the Battle of the River Plate took place. During this battle, the German pocket battleship Admiral Graf Spee was severely damaged by British ships on the waters of the River Plate estuary. Cornered, the German captain Hans Langsdorff ordered the scuttling of the ship, while the crew were taken under custody and interned by Uruguayan and Argentine authorities. While under custody, Hans Langsdorff later committed suicide at the Immigrant's Hotel in Buenos Aires, while the crew was eventually released, a dozen of them taking residence in Argentina and Uruguay.

=== Aborted attempt to join the Allies ===
In December 1939, partly as a consequence of the Battle of the River Plate, the Ortiz government concluded that the worldwide nature of the conflict would eventually make neutrality untenable and impossible to maintain. Thus, Minister of Foreign Affairs José Maria Cantilo was tasked with drafting a proposal, under which Argentina, together with the U.S. and eventually other Latin American states, would join the Allies as "non-belligerent" states, offering economic and diplomatic support to the European Allies.

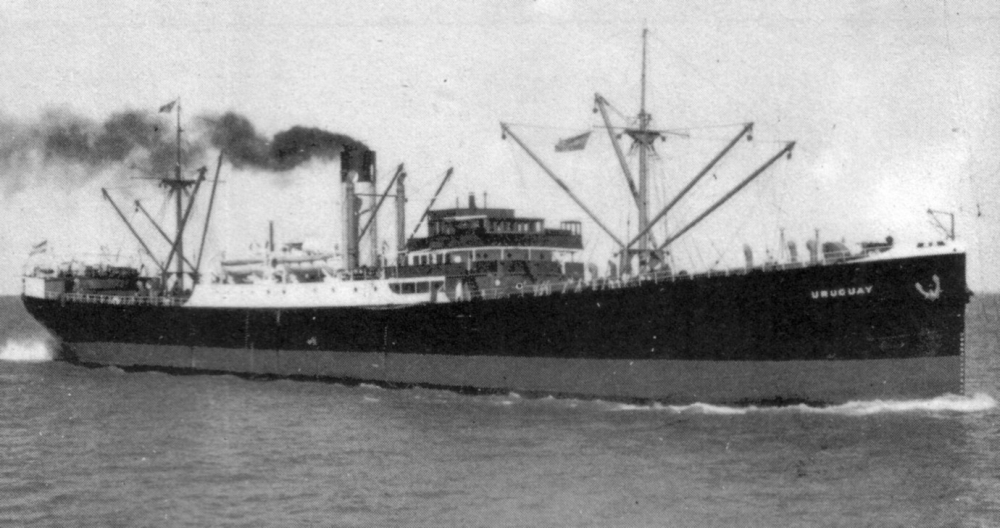
The Argentine cargo ship Uruguay, stopped and scuttled by the German submarine U-37 on 27 May 1940

In April 1940, Foreign Affairs Minister Cantilo made a visit to U.S. ambassador Normal Armour, presenting the Argentine proposal for the U.S., Argentina and other Latin American states to join the war together as non-belligerent parties. However, the Argentine proposal suffered from bad timing, as then U.S. president, Franklin D. Roosevelt, was in the midst of a challenging and controversial re-election campaign for an unprecedented third term in office. To make things worse, on 12 May 1940, the Argentine proposal was leaked to the press, and was published nationwide by Argentine daily newspaper La Nación, leading to much confusion in the country, and outrage among nationalist groups, who demanded Ortiz's resignation. On 13 May, the Argentine government issued a communique acknowledging the existence of the proposal, and on 18 May another communique was issued, clarifying that Argentina would continue to observe the "most strict neutrality" in the conflict.

The leak of this proposal at an early stage of the conflict, together with the perceived diplomatic snub, severely weakened the position of the Ortiz administration and of pro-Allied factions within the Argentine government, intensifying nationalist sentiment and opposition to Ortiz in military circles.

=== Ortiz's resignation and growing divisions ===
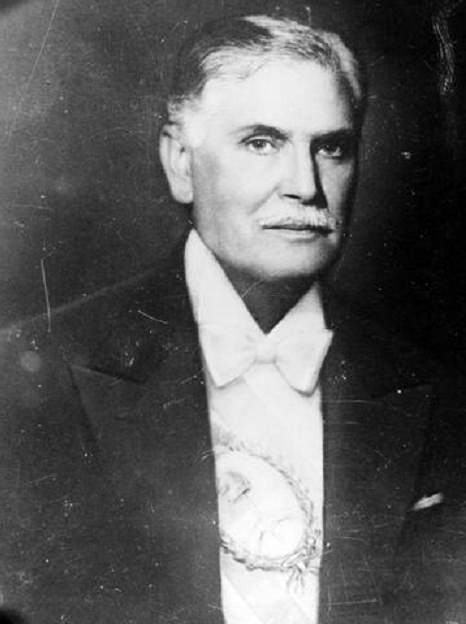
Vice-president Ramón Castillo, a conservative politician from Catamarca Province, became acting President of Argentina following the leave of absence by Ortiz in 1940.

From the beginning of his administration, Ortiz had been suffering from diabetes, and his health continued to deteriorate throughout his presidency. By 3 July 1940, after only two years in office, Ortiz had lost much of his eyesight, and thus he requested a temporary leave of absence from his duties as president, being replaced by conservative Vice-president Ramón S. Castillo, who became acting president. During Castillo's tenure, stances towards the war became more complex as the conflict developed. The main political parties, newspapers and intellectuals supported the Allies, yet Castillo maintained neutrality. Meanwhile, Ortiz was in leave of absence and unable to serve as president, but he did not resign from office. The position of Argentina vis-à-vis the war generated disputes between them, with Castillo often prevailing.

Despite several treatments from Argentine ophthalmologists, and the kind gesture of support from President Roosevelt who sent one of the best ophthalmologists from the U.S. to provide treatment as well, Ortiz's health got progressively worse, until he finally lost his eyesight completely. On 27 June 1942 he would present his full resignation to the presidency, and vice-president Castillo took office as president to fulfill the remaining two years of his mandate. Only 18 days after his resignation, Ortiz died.

Meanwhile, among civil society and the main political parties, support for Argentine intervention on the Allied side continued to grow and became widespread as the war progressed. The main pro-Allied advocacy organization was Acción Argentina, founded on 5 June 1940, from a proposal of the Socialist Party. The initial manifesto of Acción Argentina was drafted by former president Marcelo T. de Alvear, and leading members of the organization included major intellectuals, journalists, artists and politicians from a wide ideological spectrum, among them Alicia Moreau de Justo, Américo Ghioldi, José Aguirre Cámara, Mauricio Yadarola, Rodolfo Fitte, Rafael Pividal, Raúl C. Monsegur, Federico Pinedo, Jorge Bullrich, Alejandro Ceballos, Julio A. Noble, Victoria Ocampo, Emilio Ravignani, Nicolás Repetto, Mariano Villar Sáenz Peña and Juan Valmaggia. The organization grew to encompass 300 chapters across the country, and organized political meetings and protests, propaganda posters, leaflets, and even direct actions attempting to expose Nazi activity in the country.

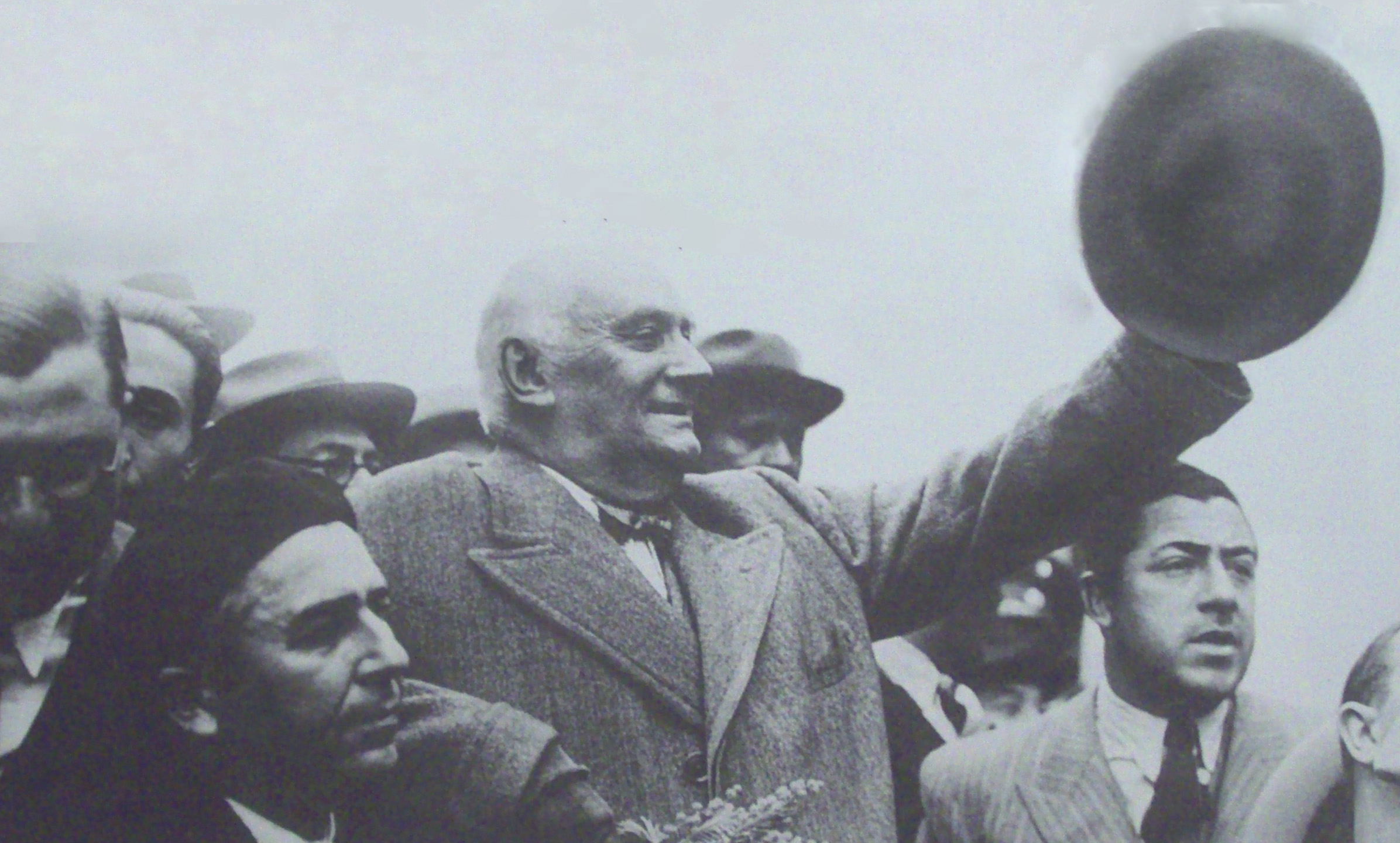
Former President Marcelo T. de Alvear remained a leading advocate for the entry of Argentina on the Allied side, and a major political figure until his death in 1942.

On the side of those opposing entry into the war, FORJA was the only political party that supported neutrality throughout the war, seeing it as an opportunity to get rid of what they considered British meddling with the Argentine economy. Starting in 1940, the FORJA faction led by Dellepiane and Del Mazo had drifted away from the organization and rejoined the UCR, while FORJA itself adopted more nationalistic and left-wing ideas, under the leadership of Arturo Jauretche. Nationalistic sectors of the army also promoted neutrality as a way to oppose the United Kingdom and its economic influence. During this time, a plan was presented by one naval officer to invade the Falkland Islands, but it went no further. On the other hand, the newspaper El Pampero, financed by the German embassy, actively supported Adolf Hitler.

Within the Argentine Army, Germanophile sentiments were strong among many officers, an influence that predated both world wars, having been steadily growing since 1904. Generally, it did not involve a rejection of democracy but rather an admiration of German military history, which combined with an intense Argentine nationalism influenced the main stance of the army towards the war: maintaining neutrality. The arguments in favor ranged from support for the Argentine military tradition (as the country had been neutral during both World War I and the War of the Pacific), to a rejection of foreign attempts to coerce Argentina into joining a war perceived as a conflict between foreign countries with no Argentine interests at stake, to outright Anglophobia. Though only a handful of military leaders actually supported Hitler and pro-Axis positions were a minority, their true influence inside the army remains difficult to ascertain, as their advocates generally disguised themselves and adopted nationalist arguments.

Meanwhile, the Communist Party aligned itself with the diplomatic policies of the Soviet Union. As a result, it supported neutrality and opposed the British influence in Argentina during the early stages of the war, in line with the Treaty of Non-Aggression between Germany and the Soviet Union. The launching of Operation Barbarossa and the consequent Soviet entry in the war changed that attitude. Some Trotskyists promoted the fight against the Third Reich as an early step of an international class struggle.

As for the Castillo administration, there are a number of interpretations for his reasons for staying neutral. One such perspective focuses on the Argentine tradition of neutrality. Others see Castillo as a nationalist, not being influenced by the power structure in Buenos Aires (since he was from Catamarca), so that, with the support of the army, he could simply defy the pressure to join the Allies. A similar interpretation considers instead that Castillo simply had no power to go against the wishes of the army, and if he declared war he would be deposed in a military coup. A third point of view considers that the U.S. was the sole promoter of Argentina's entry into the war, whereas the United Kingdom benefited from Argentine neutrality as it was a major supplier of beef and wheat. This, however, fails to acknowledge the Anglophile factions' constant requests to declare war. Most likely, it was a combination of the desires of the British diplomacy and the Argentine army, which prevailed over the pro-war factions.

Socialist deputy Enrique Dickmann created a commission in the National Congress to investigate a rumored German attempt to seize Patagonia and then conquer the rest of the country. The conservative deputy Videla Dorna claimed that the real risk was a similar Communist invasion, and FORJA believed that a German invasion was only a potential risk, whereas British dominance of the Argentine economy was a reality.

A diplomatic mission by the British Lord Willingdon arranged commercial treaties whereby Argentina sent thousands of cattle to Britain at no charge, decorated with the Argentine colours and with the phrase "good luck" written on them. El Pampero and FORJA criticised this arrangement, with Arturo Jauretche and Homero Manzi proclaiming "these are the goods that are not being sent to our needy compatriots in the provinces".

== After Pearl Harbor ==
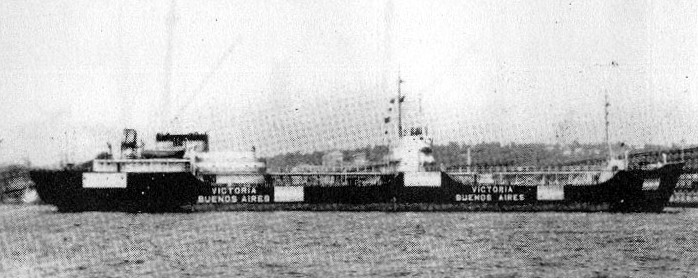
The cargo ship Victoria, which the German submarine U-201 damaged in error on 18 April 1942.

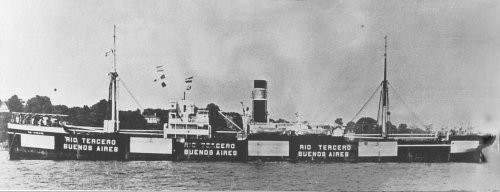
The cargo ship Rio Tercero, which the German submarine U-202 sank in error off New York on 22 June 1942.

The situation changed dramatically after the Japanese attack on Pearl Harbor and the subsequent American declaration of war upon Japan. During the Third Consultation Meeting of Foreign Ministers of the Americas (1942 Rio Conference), the U.S. tried to get every Latin American country to join the Allies to generate a continent-wide resistance to the Axis. But the government of Castillo, through foreign minister Enrique Ruiz Guiñazu, opposed the American proposal. From that moment onwards, relations between both countries worsened, and American pressure for Argentine entry into the war began to increase.

Castillo did, however, declare a state of emergency after the attack on Pearl Harbor.

=== Military plots ===
Castillo's term was due to end in 1944. Initially, it was arranged that Agustín Pedro Justo would run for president for a second time, but after his unexpected death in 1943 Castillo was forced to seek another candidate, finally settling on Robustiano Patrón Costas. The army, however, was neither willing to support the electoral fraud that would be necessary to secure Costas's victory, nor to continue conservative policies, nor to risk Costas breaking neutrality. A number of generals reacted by creating a secret organization called the United Officers' Group (GOU) to oust Castillo from power. Future president Juan Perón was a member of this group but did not support an early coup, recommending instead to postpone the overthrowing of the government until the plotters had developed a plan to make necessary reforms. The coup was to take place close to the elections, should the electoral fraud have been confirmed, but it was instead carried out earlier in response rumors of the possible sacking of the minister of war, Pedro Pablo Ramírez.

It is not known for certain whether Patrón Costas would have maintained neutrality or not. But some declarations of support to Britain and his ties with pro-allied factions suggest that had he become president he would have declared war.

=== 1943 coup ===
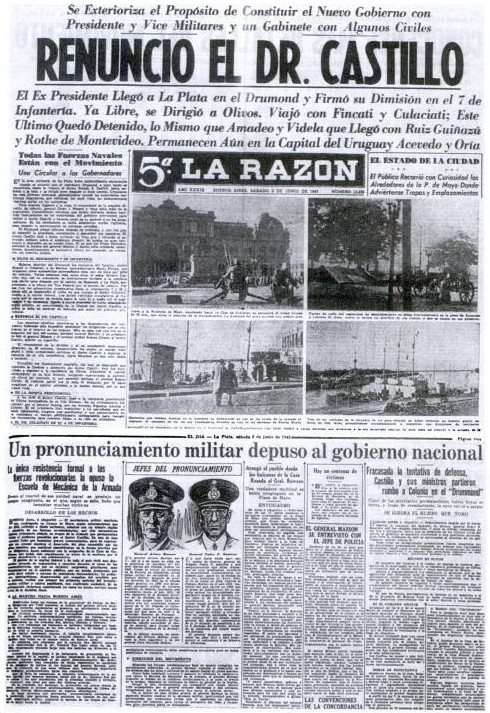
A newspaper announcing the 1943 military coup.

The military coup that deposed Castillo took place on 4 June 1943. It is considered the end of the Infamous Decade and the starting point of the self-styled Revolution of '43. Arturo Rawson took power as de facto president. The nature of the coup was confusing during its first days: German embassy officials burned their documentation fearing a pro-Allied coup, while the U.S. embassy considered it a pro-Axis coup.

Rawson met with a delegate from the British embassy on 5 June and promised to break relations with the Axis powers and declare war within 72 hours. This turn of events enraged the GOU, as did Rawson's choices for his cabinet. A new coup took place, replacing Rawson with Pedro Pablo Ramírez. Thus, Rawson became the shortest non-interim president in Argentine history.

One of the first measures of the new Ramírez government was to prohibit Acción Argentina and its pro-Allied advocacy activities.

The new government proceeded with both progressive and reactionary policies. Maximum prices were established for popular products, rents were reduced, the privileges of the Chadopyff factory were annulled and hospital fees were abolished. On the other hand, the authorities intervened trade unions, closed the Communist newspaper La Hora and imposed religious education at schools. Perón and Edelmiro Julián Farrell, hailing from the Ministry of War, fostered better relations between the state and the unions.

As previously discussed, the Communist Party had aligned itself with the diplomatic policies of the Soviet Union. Following the launching of Operation Barbarossa and the consequent Soviet entry in the war, the Communists became pro-war and halted its support for further labour strikes against British factories located in Argentina. This switch redirected workers' support from the Communist Party to Perón and the new government.

As a result, the Communist Party turned against the government, which it viewed as pro-Nazi. Perón countered complaints by declaring that "The excuses they seek are very well known. They say we are 'nazis', I declare we are as far from Nazism as from any other foreign ideology. We are only Argentines and want, above all, the common good for Argentines. We do not want any more electoral fraud, nor more lies. We do not want that those who do not work live from those who do".

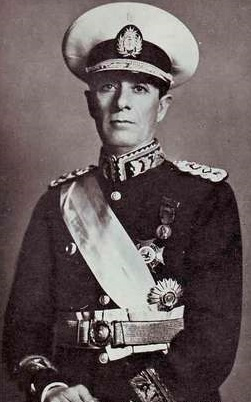
One of the leading figures behind the 1943 military coup, Pedro Pablo Ramírez was suspected of having Axis sympathies.

The government held diplomatic discussions with the U.S., with Argentina requesting aircraft, fuel, ships and military hardware. The Argentine Minister of Foreign Affairs Segundo Storni argued that, although Argentina refrained from participating in the war, it remained closer to the Allies, sending them food, and that up to then the Axis powers had not taken action against the country to justify a declaration of war. U.S. Secretary of State Cordell Hull replied that Argentina was the only Latin American country to not have broken relations with the Axis, that Argentine food was sold at lucrative return, and that U.S. military hardware was intended for countries already at war, some of which were facing more severe fuel shortages than was Argentina. Storni resigned after this rejection. The U.S. took further measures to increase pressure on Argentina. All Argentine companies suspected of having ties with the Axis powers were blacklisted and boycotted, and the supply of newsprint was limited to pro-Allied newspapers. American exports of electronic appliances, chemical substances and oil production infrastructure were halted. The properties of forty-four Argentine companies were seized, and scheduled loans were halted. Hull wanted to weaken the Argentine government or force its resignation. Torn between diplomatic and economic pressure as opposed to an open declaration of war against Argentina, he opted for the former to avoid disrupting the supply of food to Britain. Nevertheless, he also saw the situation as a chance for the U.S. to have a greater influence over Argentina than Britain.

The U.S. also threatened to accuse Argentina of being involved with the coup of Gualberto Villarroel in Bolivia, and a plot to receive weapons from Germany after the allied refusal, to face the possible threat of invasion either by the U.S. itself or Brazil acting on their behalf. However, it would be unlikely that Germany would provide such weapons, given their fragile situation in 1944. Ramírez called a new meeting of the GOU, and it was agreed to break diplomatic relations with the Axis powers (albeit without yet a declaration of war) on 26 January 1944.

The break in relations generated unrest within the military, and Ramírez considered removing both the influential Farrell and Perón from the government. However, their faction discovered Ramírez's plan. They broke up the GOU, to avoid letting the military loyal to Ramírez know they were aware of his plot, and then initiated a coup against him. Edelmiro Julián Farrell became then the new president of Argentina on 24 February.

The U.S. refused to recognise Farrell as long as he maintained the neutralist policy, which was ratified by Farrell on 2 March, and the U.S. broke relations with Argentina two days later. Winston Churchill complained about the harsh policy of the U.S. against Argentina, pointing out that Argentine supplies were vital to the British war effort and that removing their diplomatic presence from the country would even force Argentina to seek Axis protection. British diplomacy sought to guarantee the supply of Argentine food by signing a treaty covering it, while US diplomatic policy sought to prevent such a treaty. Hull ordered the confiscation of Argentine goods in the U.S., suspension of foreign trade with her, prohibited US ships from mooring at Argentine ports, and denounced Argentina as the "nazi headquarters in the Western hemisphere".

According to historian Norberto Galasso, at this point Washington held talks with Brazil, exploring plans for military intervention. The Brazilian ambassador in Washington is said to have claimed that Buenos Aires could be completely destroyed by the Brazilian Air Force, allowing Argentina to be dominated without the open intervention of the U.S., who would support Brazil by providing ships and bombs.

=== War's end ===
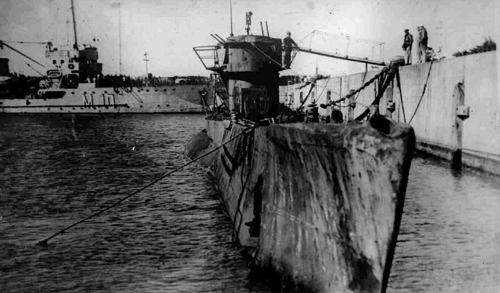
The German submarine U-977 moored at Mar del Plata, after being surrendered to the Argentine Navy in August 1945

The Liberation of Paris in August 1944 gave new hopes to the pro-Allied factions in Argentina, who saw it as an omen of the possible fall of the Argentine government and called for new elections. The demonstrations in support of Paris soon turned into protests against the government, leading to incidents with the police. It was rumored that some Argentine politicians in Uruguay would create a government in exile, but the project never came to fruition. President Franklin Roosevelt supported Hull's claims about Argentina with similar statements. He also cited Churchill when he stated that history would judge all nations for their role in the war, both belligerents and neutrals.

By early 1945, World War II was nearing its end. The Red Army had captured Warsaw and was closing in on East Prussia, and Berlin itself was under attack. Allied victory was imminent. Perón, the strong man of the Argentine government, foresaw that the Allies would dominate international politics for decades and concluded that although Argentina had successfully resisted the pressure to force it to join the war, remaining neutral until the end of the war would force the country into isolationism at best or bring about a military attack from the soon to be victorious powers.

Negotiations were eased by the departure of Hull as Secretary of State, replaced by Edward Stettinius Jr., who demanded that Argentina hold free elections, declare war against the Axis powers, eradicate all Nazi presence in the country and give its complete cooperation to international organizations. Perón agreed, and German organizations were curtailed, pro-Nazi manifestations were banned, and German goods were seized. The Argentine merchant navy was instructed to ignore the German blockade. These measures eased relations with the U.S. When the Allies advanced into Frankfurt, Argentina finally formalized the negotiations. On 27 March, per Decree 6945, Argentina declared war on Japan and, by extension, on Germany, an ally of Japan. FORJA, one of the main proponents of neutrality, distanced itself from the government, but eventually Arturo Jauretche would come to support the government's change of position a year later. Jauretche reasoned that the U.S. opposed Argentina because of its perceived sm by refusing to declare war although neutrality was based instead on Argentine interests; which were no longer at stake with a declaration of war when the country would not actually join the conflict. Jauretche came to believe that Perón's pragmatism was better for the country than his own idealistic perspective of keeping a neutral stance to the end of the war.

A few days later, on 10 April, the United Kingdom, France, the U.S., and the other Latin American countries restored diplomatic relations with Argentina. Still, diplomatic hostility against Argentina from the U.S. resurfaced after the unexpected death of Roosevelt, who was succeeded by Harry S. Truman. Ambassador Spruille Braden would organize opposition to the government of Farrell and Perón.

The final Axis defeat in the European Theatre of World War II took place a month later and was greeted with demonstrations of joy in Buenos Aires. Similar demonstrations took place in August, after the surrender of Japan, bringing World War II to its final end. Farrell lifted the state of emergency declared by Castillo after the 1941 attack on Pearl Harbor.

In early May 1945, amid Germany's surrender at the end of World War II in Europe, two German U-boats, U-530 and U-977, opted to flee to Argentina rather than surrender to the Allies. The subs reached Mar del Plata, Buenos Aires Province, on 10 July and 17 August 1945, respectively. Argentina quickly handed them over to the American military after first summoning U.S. and British Royal Navy experts to interrogate them and examine documentation. U-530's captain did not explain why the ship's log and crew identity papers were tossed overboard or their two-month delay.

== Local Nazi activity ==
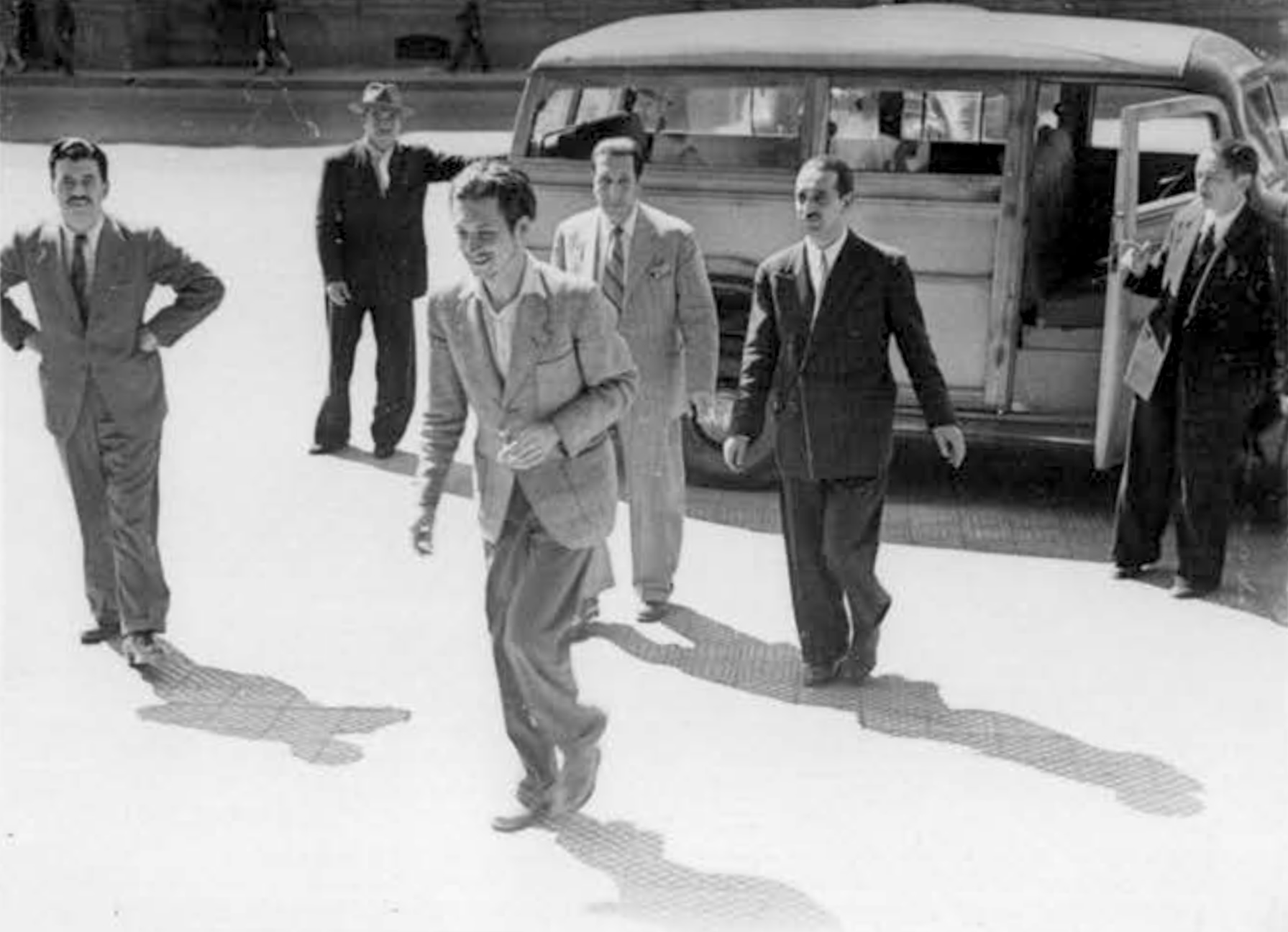
Nazi supporters, evidently including Juan Perón (center), and potential undercover counterespionage agents (from Chile's international anti-Nazi probe)

The Nazis had a presence in Argentina since 1925, with a peak of 2,110 local party members in 1935, dwindling to 1,400 in 1938, and officially dissolving in May 1939; subsequently, they operated in secret under the guise of German labor organizations. Buenos Aires served a major center of Axis espionage.

There was also a substantial German community in Argentina as a result of 19th-century immigration. This community included many German Jews, liberals, social democrats and other opponents of Nazism (e.g. staff of Argentina's main German-language newspaper, which was banned in Germany for its opposition to Hitler). However, it also included supporters of Hitler and the Nazi Party, and Argentina hosted a strong, well-organized pro-Nazi element that was controlled by the German ambassador. During the war, Nazi Germany conducted espionage activities in Latin America, which was investigated by Chile and the United States Federal Bureau of Investigation. The network at large was dismantled and most (but not all) of its agents were arrested in 1944. Additionally, by 1946, the U.S. Senate had a list of party memberships c. 1939.

At some point, German-Argentine millionaire Ludwig Freude, who oversaw Buenos Aires's German Overseas Bank (a subsidiary of Deutsche Bank), established contacts with Swiss banks. An early 1940s investigation ordered by anti-Nazi president Ortiz identified 12,000 Nazi sympathizers in Argentina who had contributed some US$40.5 million (2025 currency) to a single account at Schweizerische Kreditanstalt (later acquired by Credit Suisse). The various government documents indicate financial ties amidst the German Overseas Bank, the nearby German-South American Bank (a subsidiary of Dresdner Bank and the site of the Nazi headquarters), Freude, the Eichhorns, and others linked to numerous Argentine companies blacklisted by the U.S., such as subsidiaries of IG Farben (which supplied the Nazis with Zyklon B). In 1943, the pro-fascist GOU destroyed all known copies of the list. (Note: In 1984, a copy of the list was obtained by an employee of an Argentine state-owned bank (reportedly housed in the former Nazi headquarters). In 2020, the list was shared with the Simon Wiesenthal Center (SWC), which theorized that funds derived from Nazi plunder was sent to the listed Nazi collaborators for deposit in the Swiss account for Nazi Germany to withdraw in exchangeable, non-German currency. The SWC requested access to Credit Suisse's archives to determine if wealth looted from Holocaust victims was still being held.)

In June 1941, Germany sent 83 boxes of documents from its embassy in Tokyo, Japan, via the MS Nana Maru to Buenos Aires. Customs agents impounded the boxes, which were searched by Argentina's foreign ministry. Five boxes contained Nazi propaganda hidden amid material labeled as "scientific, literary and cultural", while the others housed mostly children's books, magazines and war photographs. A month later, Argentine officials raided the secret offices of the banned Nazi Party. Perhaps 5,000 seized memberships from the German Labor Front and the German trade union association were stored by the Supreme Court of Argentina.

In May 1943, Schutzstaffel (SS) functionary Walter Schellenberg secured a secret agreement with the Argentine military that excluded Nazis from arrest in Argentina and established a diplomatic pouch exchange system between the two regimes. The coup d'état that June opened a way for Perón's rise to power. Meanwhile, German wealth derived from looting Holocaust victims was placed in a Reichsbank account under the false name of Max Heiliger. By 1944, this was worth millions of Reichsmarks, in addition to shipments to the Reich Chancellery headquarters of Martin Bormann. SS officer Otto Skorzeny facilitated the international transfer of wealth from the account, reportedly depositing it in the name of Perón's future wife, Eva. According to The New York Times, the U.S. State Department reported in 1945 that "the personal fortunes of Nazi officials" were delivered to Buenos Aires via diplomatic pouch, with Nazi higher-up Hermann Göring possessing over US$20 million and a U-boat loaded with Nazi loot.

Reportedly aligned with Nazi intelligence, Ludwig Freude coordinated contributions from Nazi collaborators to Perón's 1946 presidential campaign. Perón appointed anthropologist Santiago Peralta (an avowed anti-Semite) as his immigration commissioner and Ludwig's son Rodolfo Freude as the head of the country's first intelligence bureau.

=== Ratline escapees ===
After their appointment, Peralta and Rodolfo Freude evidently aided European war criminals by streamlining their pathway to citizenship and employing them within their departments. Péron's regime collaborated with an existing ratline and operated additional ratlines through Scandinavia and Switzerland. As many as 5,000 Nazi war criminals escaped to Argentina, some as late as 1950, the year Adolf Eichmann arrived. Péron later stated that he helped as many Nazi officials as possible in a reaction to the Nuremberg trials of Nazi war criminals (1945–1946), which he thought were a "disgrace".

In the late 1940s, under Perón's leadership, the government secretly allowed entry of a number of war criminals fleeing Europe after Nazi Germany's collapse, as part of the ratlines. More than 300 Nazi fugitives fled to Argentina, including war criminals such as Erich Priebke, Joseph Mengele, Eduard Roschmann, Josef Schwammberger, Walter Kutschmann, and Gestapo Colonel Adolf Eichmann. This also included members of the ultranationalist Ustaše regime from the Independent State of Croatia, including its leader, Ante Pavelić.

In May 1960, Eichmann was kidnapped in Argentina by the Israeli Mossad and brought to trial in Israel, where he was executed in 1962. At the time, Argentina condemned the Israeli government for abducting Eichmann, demanding he be returned to face arrest and extradition through the proper channels. This led to a diplomatic spat between the nations, which was solved amicably shortly afterwards.

In 1992, President Carlos Menem declassified several police files regarding the escape of Nazi fugitives to Argentina, and in 1997 he created a special commission to investigate their activities. This, along with collaboration between local authorities and the Simon Wiesenthal Center, led to the arrest of notorious war criminals such as Priebke, Šakić and Kutschmann. In 2000, President Fernando de la Rúa issued a formal state apology for Argentina's role in aiding the escape of Nazi fugitives.

== Argentines in World War II ==
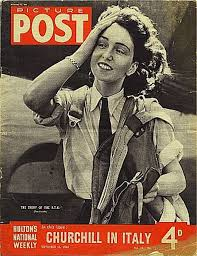
Anglo-Argentine pilot Maureen Dunlop recorded over 800 hours of service for the Air Transport Auxiliary and was featured on the cover of the Picture Post on 16 September 1942.

During World War II, 4,000 Argentines served with all three British armed services, even though Argentina was officially a neutral country during the war. Over 600 Argentine volunteers served with both the Royal Air Force and the Royal Canadian Air Force, mostly in No. 164 (Argentine) squadron, whose shield bore the sun from the Flag of Argentina and the motto, "Determined We Fly (Firmes Volamos)".

Maureen Dunlop, born in Quilmes, left her Australian/English parents to join the Air Transport Auxiliary. She recorded over 800 hours of service, ferrying Supermarine Spitfires, de Havilland Mosquitos North American P-51 Mustangs, Hawker Typhoons, and bomber types including the Vickers Wellington and Avro Lancaster to the frontline RAF stations. After being photographed exiting a Fairey Barracuda, she featured on the cover of Picture Post on 16 September 1942, and became a wartime pin-up. Dunlop returned to Argentina after the war, and continued work as a commercial pilot who also flew for and trained pilots of the Argentine Air Force. She later raised pure-blood Arab horses with her husband on their stud farm, "Milla Lauquen Stud".

Nearly 500 Argentines served in the Royal Navy around the world, from the North Atlantic to the South Pacific. Many were part of the special forces, such as John Godwin.

Many members of the Anglo-Argentine community also volunteered in non-combat roles, or worked to raise money and supplies for British troops. The Anglo-Argentine Fellowship of the Bellows in Argentina raised money to buy aircraft for the RAF. In April 2005, a special remembrance service was held at the RAF church of St Clement Danes in London.

On 9 May 2015, the remains of the Argentine volunteer Group Captain Kenneth Langley Charney DFC & Bar, were repatriated and buried in the British Cemetery in Buenos Aires. Charney was born in Quilmes, Argentina, in 1920, and died in Andorra in 1982.

== Gallery ==
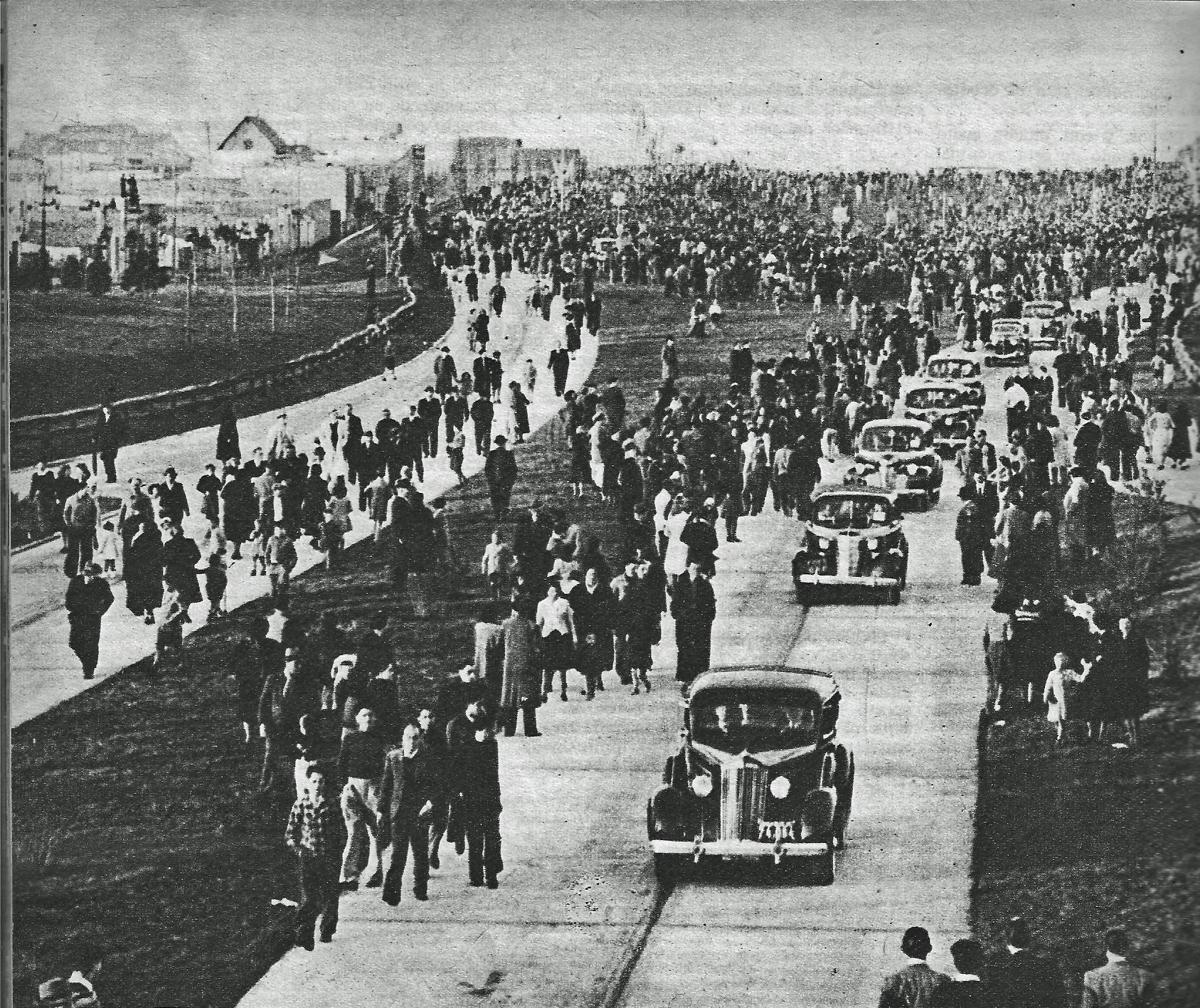
The grand opening of the Avenida General Paz in 1941

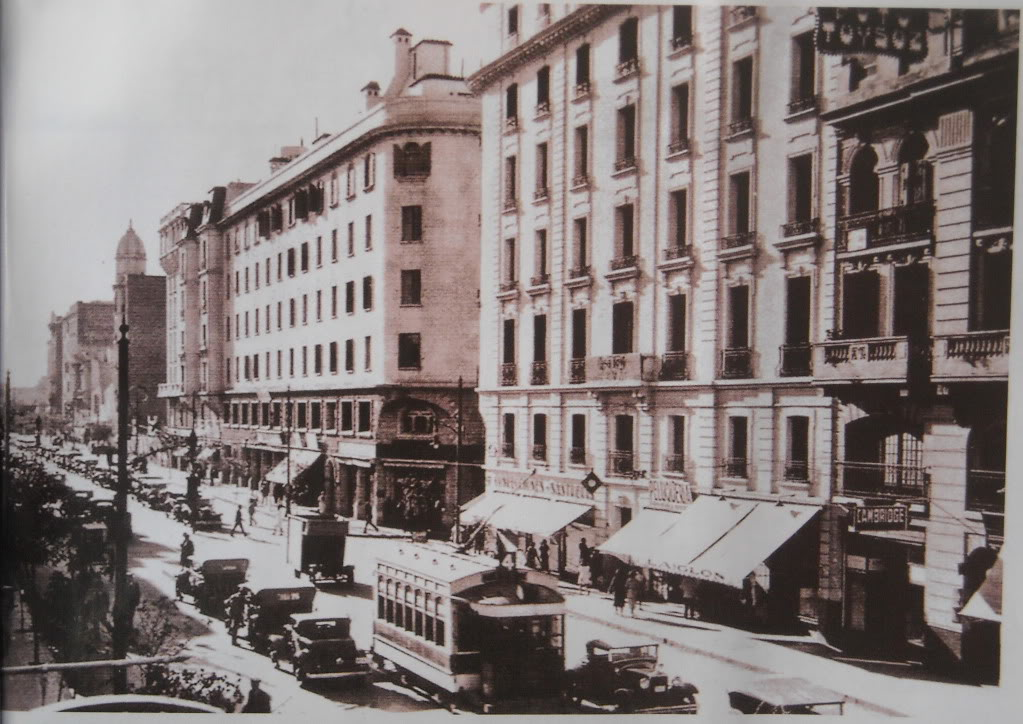
Cordoba's Emilio Olmos Avenue in 1943

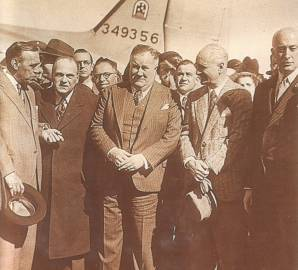
U.S. ambassador to Argentina Spruille Braden and others in 1945

== See also ==
- American Theater (1939–1945)
- Brazil in World War II

== Bibliography ==
- Di Tella, Guido, and D. Cameron Watt, eds. (2017). Argentina Between the Great Powers, 1939–46.
- Goñi, Uki (2002). The Real Odessa: Smuggling the Nazis to Perón's Argentina (1st ed.). London: Granta. ISBN 1862075816.
- Guelar, Diego Ramiro (1998). "Argentine Neutrality, and the 'Black Legend'". American University International Law Review. 14 (1): 201–204.
- Kedar, Claudia (2010). "The Beginning of a Controversial Relationship: The IMF, the World Bank, and Argentina, 1943–46." Canadian Journal of Latin American and Caribbean Studies 35.69: 201–230.
- Landsborough, Gordon (2016) [1956]. The Battle of the River Plate: The First Naval Battle of the Second World War (5th ed.). Barnsley, United Kingdom of Great Britain: Frontline Books. ISBN 978-1-4738-7897-6.
- McGaha Jr, Richard L. (2009). The Politics of Espionage: Nazi Diplomats and Spies in Argentina, 1933–1945 (Diss. Ohio University).
- Newton, Ronald C. (1992). The "Nazi Menace" in Argentina, 1931–1947. Stanford, California: Stanford University Press. ISBN 0-8047-1929-2.
- Sheinin, David M. K. (1991). "Argentina's Early Priorities in the European War: Compliance, Antisemitism, And Trade Concerns in the Response to the German Invasion of the Netherlands." Canadian Journal of Latin American and Caribbean Studies 16.31: 5–27.

=== In Spanish ===
- Filipuzzi, Pedro Alberto (2020). La Ruta del Dinero de los Nazis Argentinos: La Organización Nazi Unión Alemana de Gremios – Listado de miembros [The Money Trail of the Argentine Nazis: The Nazi Organization German Union of Guilds – List of members] (in Spanish). Letter to Credit Suisse by Ariel Gelblung, Simon Wiesenthal Center. Buenos Aires: Editorial Dunken. ISBN 978-987-85-0645-6.
- Galasso, Norberto (2006). Perón: Formación, ascenso y caída (1893–1955) (in Spanish). Buenos Aires: Colihue. ISBN 950-581-399-6.
- Galasso, Norberto (2011). Historia de la Argentina, vol. I&II (in Spanish). Buenos Aires: Colihue. ISBN 978-950-563-478-1.
- Mendelevich, Pablo (2010). El Final (in Spanish). Buenos Aires: Ediciones B. ISBN 978-987-627-166-0.
- Ruiz Moreno, Isidoro J. (1997). La Neutralidad Argentina en la Segunda Guerra Mundial (in Spanish). Buenos Aires: Emecé. ISBN 950-04-1762-6.
