= José Tamborini =

Argentine physician and politician

José P. Tamborini
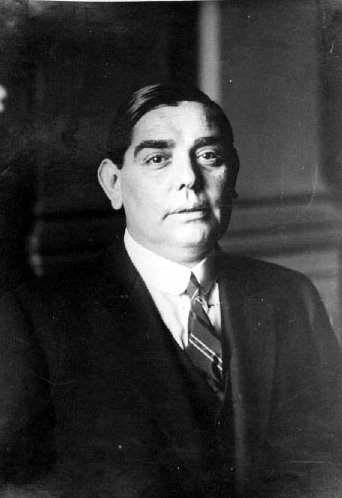

Minister of the Interior
- In office August 5, 1925 – October 12, 1928
- President: Marcelo T. de Alvear
- Preceded by: Vicente Gallo
- Succeeded by: Elpidio González

Personal details
- Born: February 22, 1886 Buenos Aires
- Died: September 25, 1955 (aged 69) Buenos Aires
- Party: Radical Civic Union; Antipersonalist Radical Civic Union
- Education: University of Buenos Aires
- Profession: Physician

José Pascual Tamborini (February 22, 1886 – September 25, 1955) was an Argentine physician, politician, and presidential candidate.

== Life and times ==
José Pascual Tamborini was born in Buenos Aires, in 1886. He enrolled at the public college preparatory school, the National College of Buenos Aires and by 1900, became affiliated with the Radical Civic Union (UCR) - then the nation's leading advocacy group for universal male suffrage. He then headed the school's UCR chapter and published its newsletter.

Tamborini received a medical degree from the University of Buenos Aires and by 1912, headed that city's UCR committee. That year, free and fair elections guaranteed by the landmark Sáenz Peña Law led to the victory of numerous UCR candidates for the Argentine Congress, including Tamborini. Following the election to the presidency of longtime UCR leader Hipólito Yrigoyen in 1916, however, Tamborini aligned himself against what a faction in the UCR viewed as the president's growing personality cult. This opposition was fueled by Yrigoyen's numerous removals of provincial governors, for instance, and soon became known as "anti-personalism."

The election of a diplomat with anti-personalist sympathies, Marcelo Torcuato de Alvear, as president in 1922 led to a division in the UCR. Congressman Tamborini joined Senate President Leopoldo Melo and others in the formation of the Antipersonalist UCR in 1924. President Alvear named Tamborini Interior Minister (overseeing law enforcement), in 1925. The aging Yrigoyen returned to power in 1928, deeping inter-party divisions; but his 1930 overthrow helped unify the UCR, and Tamborini joined the City Hotel Declaration of April 1931 to that effect.

Seeking to thwart a UCR victory ahead of the 1931 elections, the dictator, General José Félix Uriburu jailed much of its leadership - including Alvear and Tamborini. Freed after the election (which the UCR boycotted), Tamborini was returned to Congress in 1934 and stood for the UCR nomination in 1937; but he was defeated by Alvear. Elected Senator in 1940, he became the dominant figure in the UCR following Alvear's death in 1942.

A coup d'état in 1943 led to rise of the populist new Labor Minister, Col. Juan Perón. Forcing the junta to call elections for early 1946, Perón's populism and anti-U.S. sentiment rallied an unusually diverse opposition against him. Tamborini led the majority of the UCR, the reformist Democratic Progressive Party, Socialists, Communists and the conservative National Democrats (part of the Concordance that kept the UCR from power by "patriotic fraud" in the 1930s) into a Democratic Union. Joined by interests in the financial sector and the chamber of commerce, the alliance also enjoyed the support of U.S. Ambassador Spruille Braden, and was united solely by the goal of keeping Perón from the Casa Rosada. Organizing a massive kick-off rally in front of Congress on December 8, the Democratic Union nominated Tamborini and his fellow political prisoner in 1931: former Congressman Enrique Mosca. The alliance, however, failed to win over several prominent lawmakers opposed the Union's ties to conservative interests. Ambassador Braden's leak of a white paper accusing Perón of fascist ties and his addressing Democratic Union rallies in person backfired, moreover. Perón seized on this to make the election a choice between "Perón or Braden," while prevailing on President Edelmiro Farrell to enact his populist agenda and dismissing Tamborini and Mosca as "the tambourine and the fly." The Democratic Union was defeated by 11%.

Tamborini was unable to return to prominence following his break with less conservative UCR figures during that election. He ran once again for his party's nomination in 1951; but he lost to Congressman Ricardo Balbín. President Perón was overwhelmingly reelected, though on September 19, 1955, he was violently overthrown. The ailing Dr. Tamborini died a week later, at age 69.
