= Democratic Union (Argentina) =

Democratic Union Unión Democrática
- Founded: 14 November 1945
- Ideology: Liberalism; Radicalism; Republicanism; Anti-Peronism; Anti-Nazism; Socialism; Communism
- Political position: Big tent
- Colours: Red

The Democratic Union (Spanish: Unión Democrática; UD) was an electoral alliance formed in 1945 in Argentina between the Radical Civic Union, the Socialist Party, the Communist Party and the Democratic Progressive Party, to oppose the presidential ticket of Juan Domingo Perón and Hortensio Quijano at the 1946 general election.

The Radical Civic Union (UCR), at the time under control of the Alvearista faction, held the final say in the coalition. The coalition's candidates for president and vice president, respectively José Tamborini and Enrique Mosca, were UCR members. This left out the yrigoyenista section of the UCR, which was divided between supporters of Perón (Unión Cívica Radical Junta Renovadora) and the internal opposition within the Union, the "Movimiento de Intransigencia y Renovación" led by Ricardo Balbín and Arturo Frondizi.

The UCR also excluded from the alliance their old adversaries, the conservatives, which had been grouped under the banner of the National Democratic Party. This exclusion signified a coup de grace for the PDN, which soon disappeared, thus giving no conservative party a chance in elections for many decades.

The defeat of the UD alliance at the 24 February election caused the dissolution of it and compelled the participating parties to modify their strategies.
