= British investment in Argentina =

Foreign direct investment by Great Britain into Argentina was attempted, initially with little success, from the early years after Argentina's independence from Spain in the 1820s. However, it grew to large proportions in the second half of the 19th century and remained so up to the Second World War, in association with greater political stability and favourable policies in Argentina. British ownership of large parts of Argentina's industry and railway system, and British control of the financial capital that backed Argentina's growing prosperity at that time, resulted in a strong relationship between the two countries, which is viewed by some as having contained elements of imperialism.

Starting with Juan Perón in the 1940s until the 1970s, a series of presidents pursued policies of nationalization and import substitution industrialization, involving domestic ownership of industry and reduced dependence on foreign capital.

== First signs of British economic ties with Argentina (early 1800s) ==
Before the British had begun investing in Argentina, they had attempted to take military control of the Rio de Plata region while Argentina was still under Spanish rule. In 1806, British forces were able to gain control of the trading port at Buenos Aires for 45 days, during which $1 million pounds worth of cargo was imported into the city. In 1807 the British moved forward with a secondary attack which involved many more boots on the ground. While the military campaign was a failure, the result was that the population of British people in society had drastically increased. The British population in Argentina around this time during the early to mid-1800s was known for being very involved in Argentinian society, joining many social groups and forming their own business establishments. As a result of the large British population at this time, as well as the British presence in the business community, British investment from overseas increased. This is reflected in the statistic that by 1808, Buenos Aires was importing $1.3 million pounds of British goods.

=== Violence ===
The impact of this drastic increase in British imports during the early to mid-1800s meant that local artisans lost business, and the conflict caused by the shift in depending on local artisans and infrastructure for goods to depending on Britain was one of the causes of the violent civil war conflict that took place after Independence from Spain in 1816. Additionally, Caudillo owned industries in the federal states or provinces were handed over to British companies by the government in Buenos Aires. One notable case is that of the Famatina gold mines and the violence that followed.

=== Cultural Impact ===
The increase in imports and investment from Britain also had an impact on Argentinian culture, and led to overall more European influence on the culture than there would have been if Buenos Aires had not had such a strong trading relationship with England.

One aspect in which British culture clearly overtook the existing colonial Spanish culture in Argentina was in regards to dish ware. In the wake of Argentinian Independence from Spain, owning or using goods (most notably dish ware) that were of Spanish design was seen as non-patriotic, and using imported British made goods (which were plentiful due to the recent spike in British imports) became a way of expressing anti-Spanish sentiment and Argentinian nationalism. British dish ware designs with blue and white in particular were common.

== Post independence investment ==
Argentina had a unique relationship with Britain during the period after Argentinian independence all the way up to World War 2. British investment began in the 1820s, with investments in industries such as mining and agriculture, associated with prospective large-scale immigration from Europe.

=== British investment in Argentina under President Bernardino Rivadavia ===
Bernardino Rivadavia was the first President of Argentina, from 1826-27. Rivadavia wanted to open Argentina to liberal policies that he thought would increase wealth and industrialization in Argentina. His policy was to allow free trade and to lower tariffs, replacing them with taxes on the selling and renting of Argentina's plentiful reserves of land, whilst also selling off Argentinian land to foreign investors who would increase the productivity of the land. Another way Rivadavia tried to secure foreign capital was by encouraging the development of businesses that focused on agriculture and took advantage of immigration, this was part of his plan to Europeanize Argentina by welcoming European immigrants and basing economic policies off of European policies.

Despite Rivadavia's efforts to encourage British investment, a variety of factors resulted in British investment not being profitable. Rivadavia had set up the government's revenue model to heavily depend on tariff's from imports (mainly from England) -however when the Cisplatine War broke out (as a result of militants against the Brazilian government launched an attack on Brazil from Buenos Aires), Brazil responded to the aggression with a naval blockade on Argentina (blockade of the Río de la Plata), sharply decreasing government revenues that would normally be made from import tariffs. As a result of this reduction in government revenue, the Argentinian government was no longer able to afford the subsidies it had agreed to give various British industries such as mining and land ownership companies. All of these factors made Argentina appear unstable and therefore diminished foreign investors' willingness to invest in the new state. Therefore, industrialization of Argentina and its vast pampas (plains) would have to wait until the industrializing capital of Great Britain would be imported decades later.

These economic inhibitors were followed by the coming to power of the "cattle baron", Juan Manuel de Rosas, who chose to steer Argentina away from receiving foreign investment/trade from England, as well as immigrants.

=== British investment post de Rosas under General Urquiza (1852 onwards) ===
During this time period, among other factors such as European (and especially Italian) immigrants contributing to the workforce, British companies began to build railroads in Argentina, which connected the rural Pampas with cities, supporting the industry of raising cattle and growing produce in the Pampas.

The government at the time also worked to initiate economic activity by creating subsidies to encourage people to take advantage of the railroads the British were building, and travel to work in rural lands. This government initiative was known as the "Conquest of the Desert". British investment, coupled with government economic intervention led to economic success at the time and relatively superior living standards for Argentinians (compared to the rest of the world) – although the structure was simultaneously oligarchic in nature, with a small sector of the population owning much of the land. While the text acknowledges that these initiatives marked a point of modernization and economic development for Argentina, it also notes that the railroad investments made by the British and the economic success coexisted with other characteristics of the economy, such as the nation's economic success being heavily reliant on a small or non diverse group of raw exports. The text also mentions another facet of economic relations with England at the time, referring to England being a main source of imports of finished goods to Argentina.

== Investment in the Argentinian railway system ==
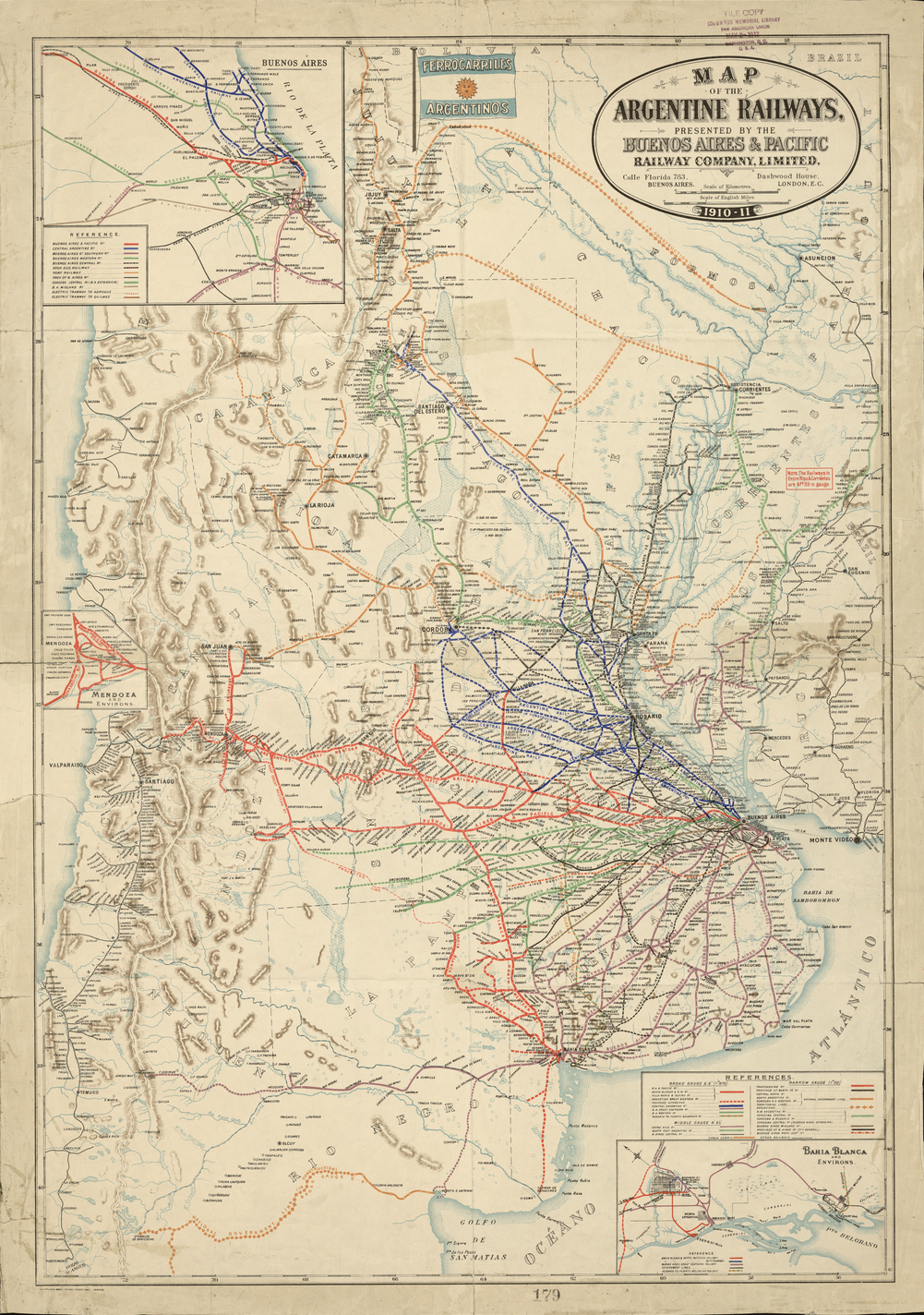
Argentinian Railway system as of 1910, the tenth largest system in the world at the time. It was financed by British investors, shown by the use of wider tracks, common to the British and not the Americans.

An essential component of the investment and development of the Argentine economy was the importation of a modern railway system. The British were responsible for the creation of the Argentine railway system. From 1860 there were 39 kilometers of railways in Argentina; by 1910 there were 23,994 kilometers. At the beginning of the twentieth century the Argentinian railway system was the 10th largest in the world, most of it being a product of English capital financing the new projects. By 1937 there were around 40,000 kilometers of railways, of which 66% was British owned, a very high proportion of foreign ownership for an independent country at this time. Since Argentina at this time did not have a well developed steel industry, the Argentinean railway projects needed to be funded by English capital since capital was limited domestically in Argentina. Railway technology also needed to be imported into Argentina from Europe or the USA.

The purpose of the Argentine railway system was not so much to transport people, as to ship out the agrarian products of the pampas. Since Argentina was developing as an agrarian export economy, railroads were built to connect the rural farmland to the main ports of Argentina, as seen in the map of Argentinian Railways in 1910-1911. Most of the lines centre on cities such Buenos Aires or Bahia Blanca and branch out to the pampas in order to retrieve goods to bring back and ship out to European markets, mainly the British. The British would send in industrial goods to make Argentinian agriculture more modern and productive, in exchange for primary products exported to Great Britain.

== Modern investment ==
With the 1943 Coup d'Etat in Argentina, and the populist President Juan Perón winning power, investment in Argentina started appearing less profitable. In 1948, Perón nationalized the railway system, which, at the time, was still mainly owned by the British. Many of the military dictators of Latin America in the 20th century were keen to practice Import Substitution Industry, that meant isolating the Latin American economies from the economies of western European and North America. The method attempted to discourage the buying of finished goods from other countries and instead to produce such goods domestically. Under the import substitution policy, democratically elected Perón, as well as several dictators, in the latter half of the twentieth century nationalized industries, with the aim of building up the industrial sector without relying on foreign capital. This naturally resulted in decreased foreign investment.

== Debate between scholars: informal empire or mutually beneficial economic partnership? ==
A scholarly article published in 2008 highlights the fact that the nature of the economic relationship between England and Argentina has been contested over time by scholars, with some scholars arguing that the relationship was an innocent economic partnership, and other scholars arguing that the relationship involved an unequal distribution of power and was colonial in nature. At times, the literature argues that the economic relationship was more hegemonic or exploitative in nature, and a form of colonialism or imperialism, citing treaties that put the British at an economic advantage. At the same time, scholars (very often the same scholars), upon gathering new information, have shifted their arguments in favor of labeling British-Argentine relations has mutually beneficial, and actually as something Argentinians (at least the elites) were openly grateful for and supportive and inviting of. Overall, the article claims that there is evidence to support both arguments, implying that the relationship was not black and white, but more nuanced.

=== An economic partnership: Argentinian (elites) views of British investment in Argentina ===
Argentinian elites viewed the British as economic allies that had supported Argentina in its economic development goals. During the late 1920's, Argentina had one of the largest populations of British people in the world. Due to their large numbers, the British were able to largely influence Argentinian culture, and that they did this by being very active in social groups in society. Argentinians also viewed England as the only European country to have directly supported their economic goals, France as culturally influential, and Italy as influential as far as Garibaldi's help during their revolution, but England was put on a pedestal compared to the other countries because of their large amount of investment in the country. This evidence is what influences some scholars to argue that the nature of the relationship between the two countries was not one of hostile economic control.

=== Propaganda regarding the nature of the relationship ===
The many British schools in Argentina, played a role in shaping public opinion on the debate regarding the nature of England and Argentina's partnership in the early twentieth century. The term "imperialist" was framed as a positive term that could be used as another way to describe democracy or liberty, and as a result, the Argentine-British economic relationship was framed in a positive nature. Later on in the 1930s, members of the Argentinian nationalist movement began to question and challenge the idea that the Anglo-Argentine relationship was free of colonial elements of control and subordination, taking on a more postcolonial approach to understanding the relationship.

=== Informal Empire: treaties that favoured the British ===
Evidence that paints the relationship between Argentina and Britain as more colonial also exists. The Roca-Runciman Treaty of 1933 provided economic protections for British companies, and fewer taxes for British goods entering Argentina (making British goods cheaper to consumers and allowing them to compete with domestic producers). This treaty is also referred to as a "legal statute of colonialism". Additionally, Britain benefitted from an agreement with Argentina that allowed it to import Argentinian beef and other goods without having to provide direct payment or agree on a payment date.

== "Control over credit" ==
Towards the 1870s, it was clear that the British were extremely influential in the economics of Argentina. This set up a unique power dynamic between the two sovereign states of Great Britain and Argentina. Some scholars have even argued that Argentina was a part of Britain's "informal empire". A. G. Hopkins explains that for imperialism to occur, the sovereignty of one state is being diminished by another state with more structural power. Susan Strange, an English political scientist, identified four main forms of structural power in her study States and Markets, one of these is "control over credit", for a developing nation it is clear that a free line of credit is essential to nation-building. Capital is needed to build industries, and the Argentinians lost their line of credit when they declared independence from Bourbon Spain. Argentina, as well as most of Latin America, lacked the domestic capital to rebuild after the destruction of infrastructure during the revolutions. Therefore, the City of London stepped in and provided the needed capital where Argentina could not. In return for this foreign capital, the Argentinians were encouraged to ensure political stability and keep the interests of foreign investors in mind.

=== Potential pressures towards globalization ===
There is also scholarly debate regarding whether or not the Argentinian elites felt like they had the ability to refuse British investment. Scholars who argue that the elites did not really have another option highlight the War of the Triple Alliance, in which Paraguay, which had refused to globalize and open its markets to British imports, ended up suffering heavy losses in an ensuing war between Paraguay and its neighbors, who some revisionist historians claim were encouraged by the British.

== See also ==
- Economic history of Argentina
