= 1940 Argentine legislative election =

- 3 March 1940
- 82 of the 158 seats in the Chamber of Deputies
- Turnout: 70.31%
Party	Vote %	Seats	+/–
Radical Civic Union	47.62	52	+25
Concordancia	39.41	25	−27
Socialist Party	8.43	5	+5
This lists parties that won seats. See the complete results below.
Results by province

Legislative elections were held in Argentina on 3 March 1940. Voter turnout was 70%.

== Results ==
Party or alliance		Votes	%	Seats	
Party or alliance		Votes	%	Won	Total
Radical Civic Union		876,991	47.62	52	78
Concordancia	National Democratic Party	453,869	24.65	17	49
Concordancia	Santa Fe Radical Civic Union	122,007	6.63	3	8
Concordancia	Concordania – National Front	68,948	3.74	0	0
Concordancia	Civic Concentration	38,151	2.07	2	6
Concordancia	Antipersonalist Radical Civic Union	32,740	1.78	3	11
Concordancia	Independent Socialist Party	4,210	0.23	0	0
Concordancia	Unified Radical Civic Union	3,769	0.20	0	0
Concordancia	Buenos Aires Province Radical Civic Union	2,063	0.11	0	0
Concordancia	Total	725,757	39.41	25	74
Socialist Party		155,152	8.43	5	5
Labour Gathering Party		30,312	1.65	0	0
Tucumán Radical Civic Union		23,888	1.30	0	1
Mendoza Radical Party		8,810	0.48	0	0
Defenders of State Employees Group		5,884	0.32	0	0
Buenos Aires City Radical Party		5,278	0.29	0	0
Socialist Workers' Party		4,647	0.25	0	0
Buenos Aires City Conservative Party		3,253	0.18	0	0
Agrarian Party		1,471	0.08	0	0
Others		30	0.00	0	0
Total		1,841,473	100.00	82	158
Valid votes		1,841,473	96.67		
Invalid votes		314	0.02		
Blank votes		63,180	3.32		
Total votes		1,904,967	100.00		
Registered voters/turnout		2,721,806	69.99		
Source: National Congress

=== Results by province ===
Province	UCR			Concordance			PS			Others		
Province	Votes	%	Seats	Votes	%	Seats	Votes	%	Seats	Votes	%	Seats
Buenos Aires	272,592	54.62	15	211,250	42.33	7	15,248	3.06	0	18	0.00	0
Buenos Aires City	164,362	40.56	12	76,927	18.98	0	119,186	29.41	5	44,727	11.04	0
Córdoba	117,422	54.83	6	92,583	43.23	3	4,159	1.94	0	—		
Corrientes	—			64,689	99.98	4	—			12	0.02	0
Entre Ríos	77,324	57.89	4	53,510	40.06	2	2,746	2.06	0	—		
Mendoza	27,059	39.69	2	27,098	39.75	1	558	0.82	0	13,457	19.74	0
San Luis	9,534	38.97	1	14,934	61.03	2	—			—		
Santa Fe	139,214	51.47	8	122,007	45.11	3	9,268	3.43	0	—		
Santiago del Estero	29,551	42.89	1	38,151	55.37	2	1,195	1.73	0	—		
Tucumán	39,933	43.08	3	24,608	26.55	1	2,792	3.01	0	25,359	27.36	0
Total	876,991	47.62	52	725,757	39.41	25	155,152	8.43	5	83,573	4.54	0
