= Enrique Mosca =

Argentine politician (1880–1950)

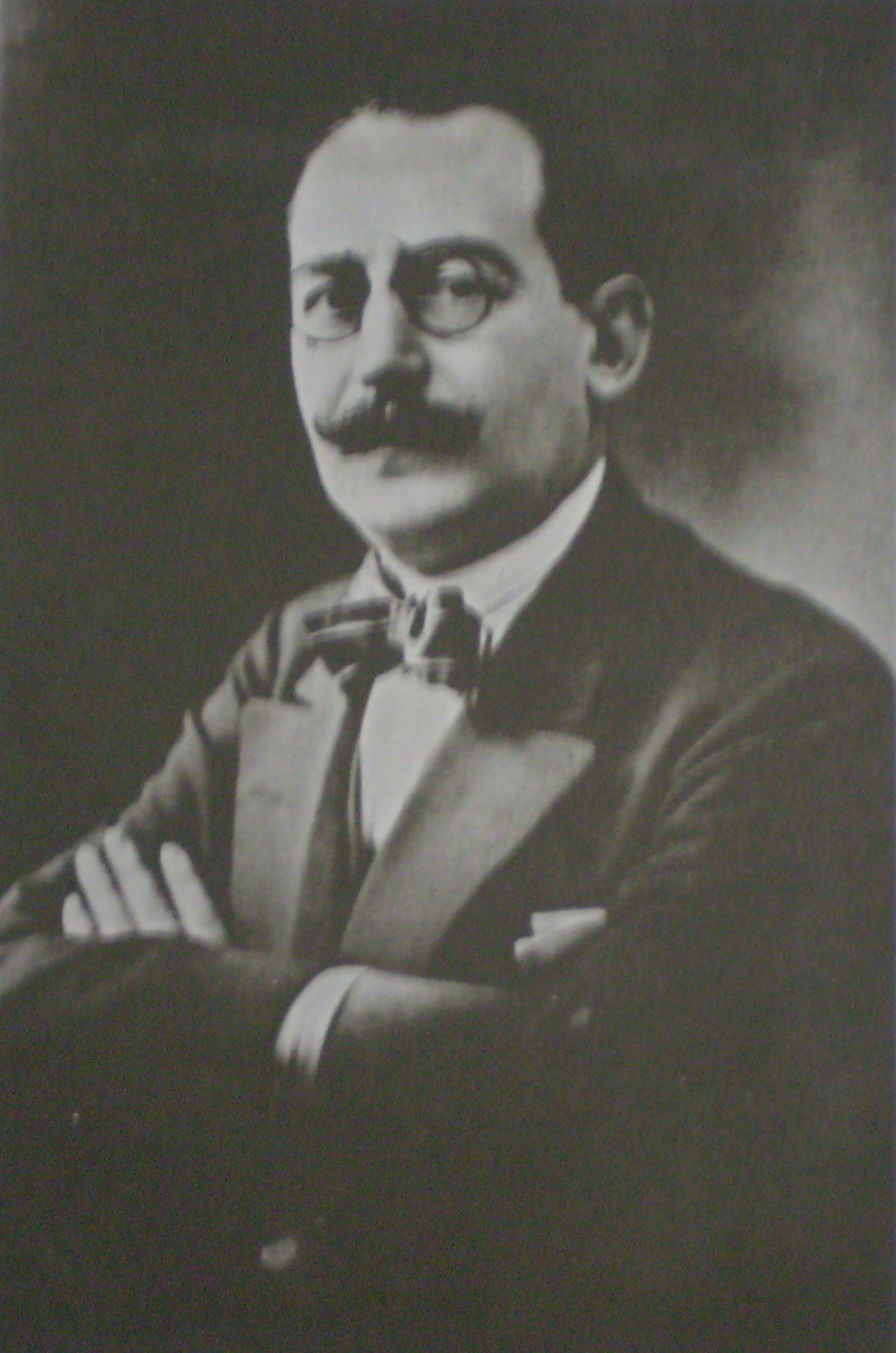
Enrique Mosca

Enrique Mosca (July 15, 1880 – July 22, 1950) was an Argentine lawyer and politician prominent in the centrist Radical Civic Union (UCR).

== Life and times ==
Enrique Mosca was born in Santa Fe, in 1880. He enrolled at the Jesuit College of the Immaculate Conception and received a juris doctor from the University of the Province of Santa Fe (today the National University of the Littoral), in 1906.

Affiliated to the UCR from his years at the university, he helped advance the UCR's push for democratic elections through his post as editor-in-chief of La Argentina, one of Santa Fe's leading newsdailies at the time. Their securing that critical reform in 1912 led to the election of the UCR's leader, Hipólito Yrigoyen, in 1916. That election also carried Mosca to Congress, and in 1920, he was elected governor of his native Santa Fe Province.

Governor Mosca enacted numerous reforms in office, while keeping a pragmatic agenda. He rescinded annual fees for public primary school students and created the Provincial Library and Archives. He vetoed the replacement of the provincial constitution for the sake of avoiding future conflict; but responded to strikes among logging industry workers by sanctioning the formation of paramilitary groups against them. This record helped earn Mosca an appointment as Federal Interventor of Mendoza Province in 1924 when President Marcelo Torcuato de Alvear removed the progressive governor, Carlos Washington Lencinas. He joined the "Antipersonalist UCR" when this faction's opposition to Yrigoyen led to a split from the party, in 1924. He was named head of the National Education Council in 1926 and was among the few Antipersonalists to win a seat in Congress in the 1928 elections, when Yrigoyen was returned to the presidency in a landslide.

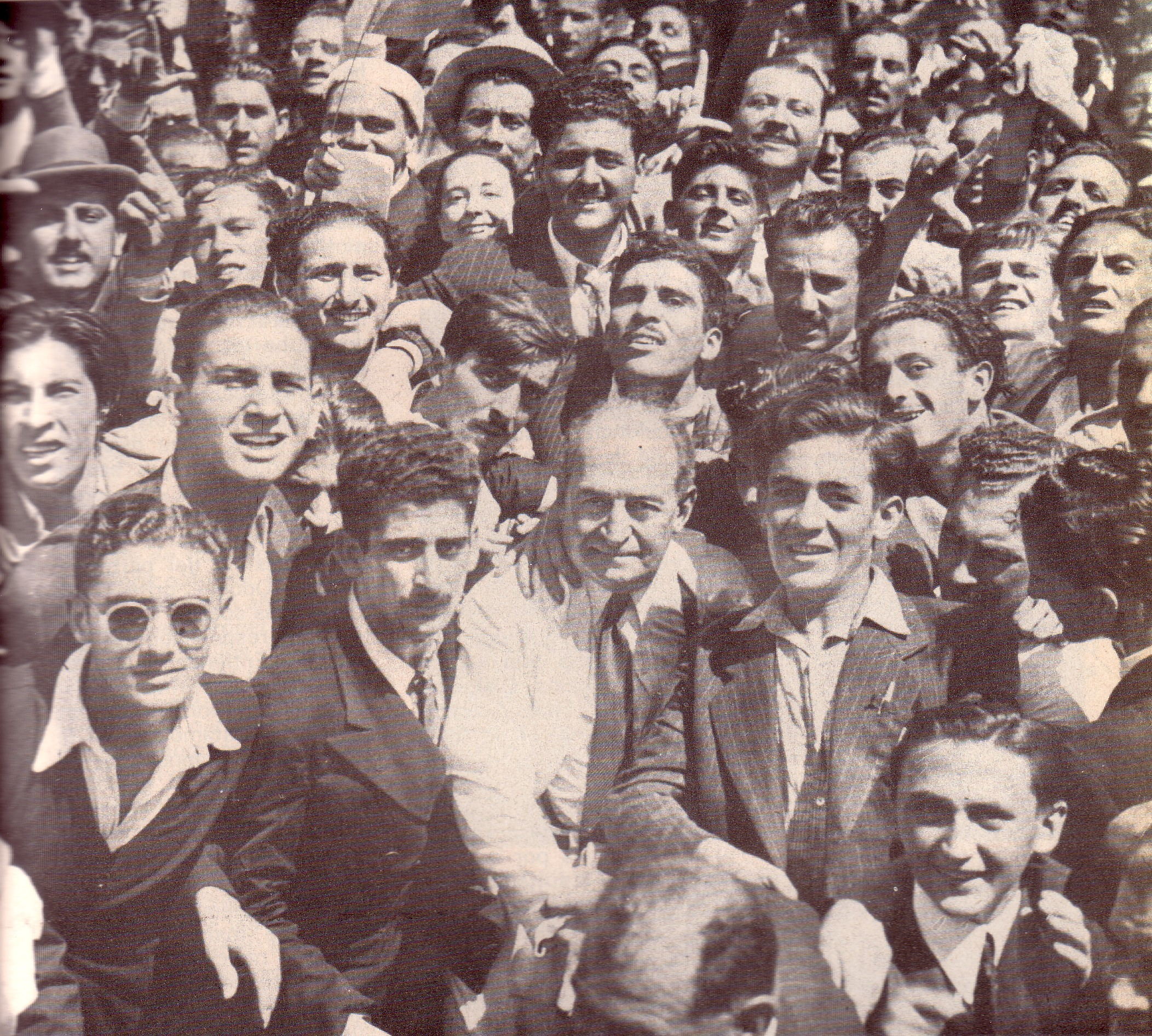
Enrique Mosca (elder man, center) in a UCR rally during the 1945-46 campaign against Juan Perón.

The overthrow of the aging Yrigoyen in 1930 met with vocal opposition from Mosca, despite his enmity towards the former. The dictatorship had him imprisoned in the notorious Ushuaia prison (now a museum) in 1931, by which Mosca's health deteriorated. Freed in 1934, he was offered the vice-presidential nomination by his party's leader, former President Alvear, ahead of the 1937 elections. Amid widespread voter intimidation and fraud, however, the duo was defeated by the ruling party candidate.

A coup d'état in 1943 led to rise of the populist new Labor Minister, Col. Juan Perón, who later forced the junta to call elections for early 1946. UCR leader José Tamborini led an unusually diverse coalition against the charismatic Perón, and named Mosca his running mate. The alliance (the Democratic Union) was united solely by the goal of keeping Perón from the Casa Rosada, and failed to win over several prominent lawmakers opposed the Union's ties to conservative interests. It was also burdened with U.S. Ambassador Spruille Braden's vocal support, which allowed Perón to make the election a choice between "Perón or Braden," while prevailing on President Edelmiro Farrell to enact his populist agenda and dismissing Tamborini and Mosca as "the tambourine and the fly." The elections, held in February, resulted in a defeat for the Tamborini-Mosca ticket by 11%.

Enrique Mosca retired from active political life and died in Buenos Aires in 1950, at age 70.
