= History of Argentina (1916–1930) =

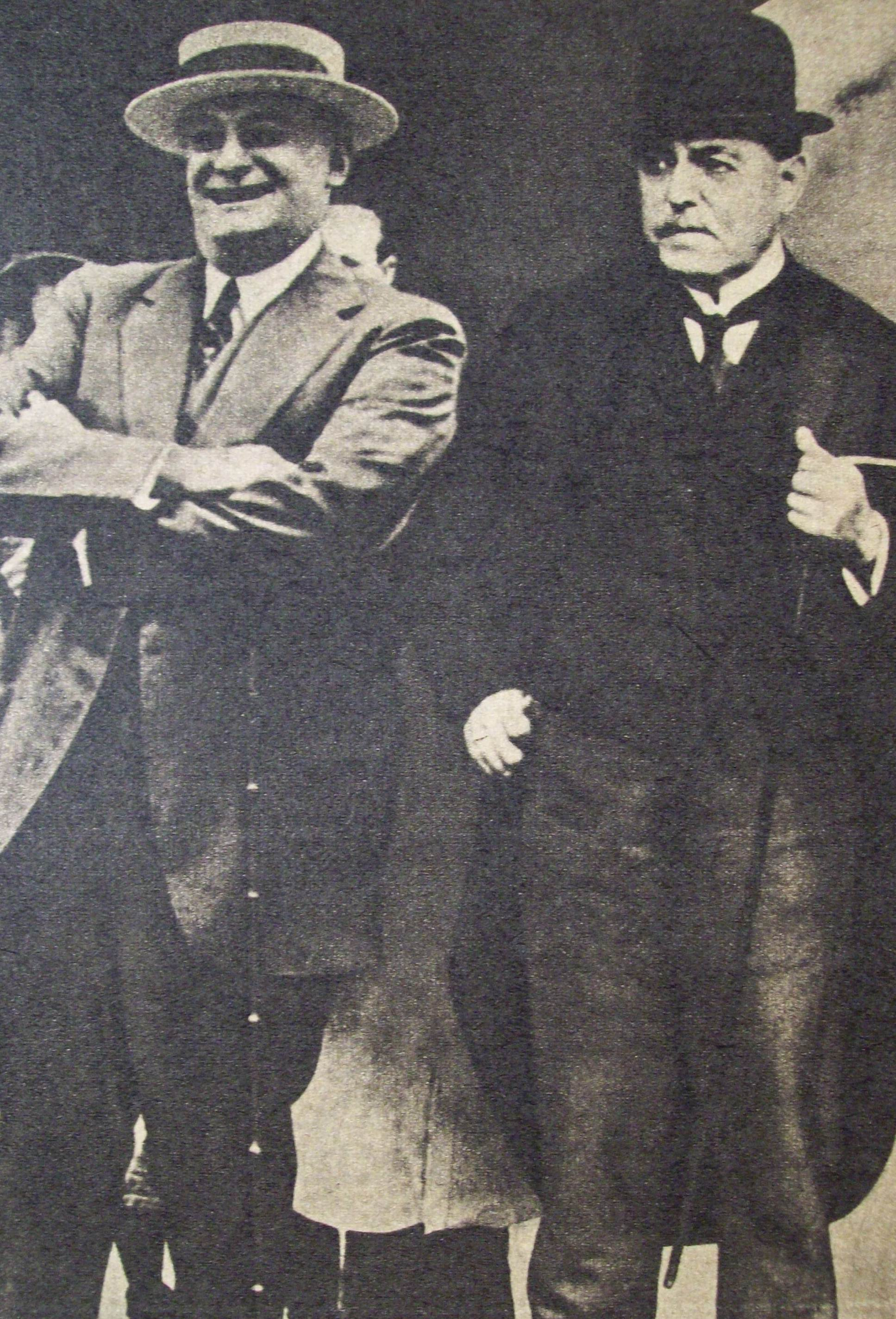
Marcelo T. de Alvear with Hipolito Yrigoyen

The period spanning from 1916 to 1930 in Argentina is known as the Radical Phase (Spanish: Etapa Radical), as it began with the election of the Radical Civic Union candidate Hipólito Yrigoyen, ending the conservative Generation of '80's domination on politics. Yrigoyen's second term, which started in 1928, was interrupted by Argentina's first military coup, which established José Félix Uriburu in power and initiated the Infamous Decade.

== The First Yrigoyen presidency (1916–1922) ==
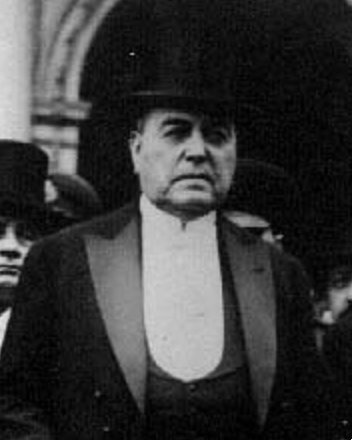
Hipólito Yrigoyen.

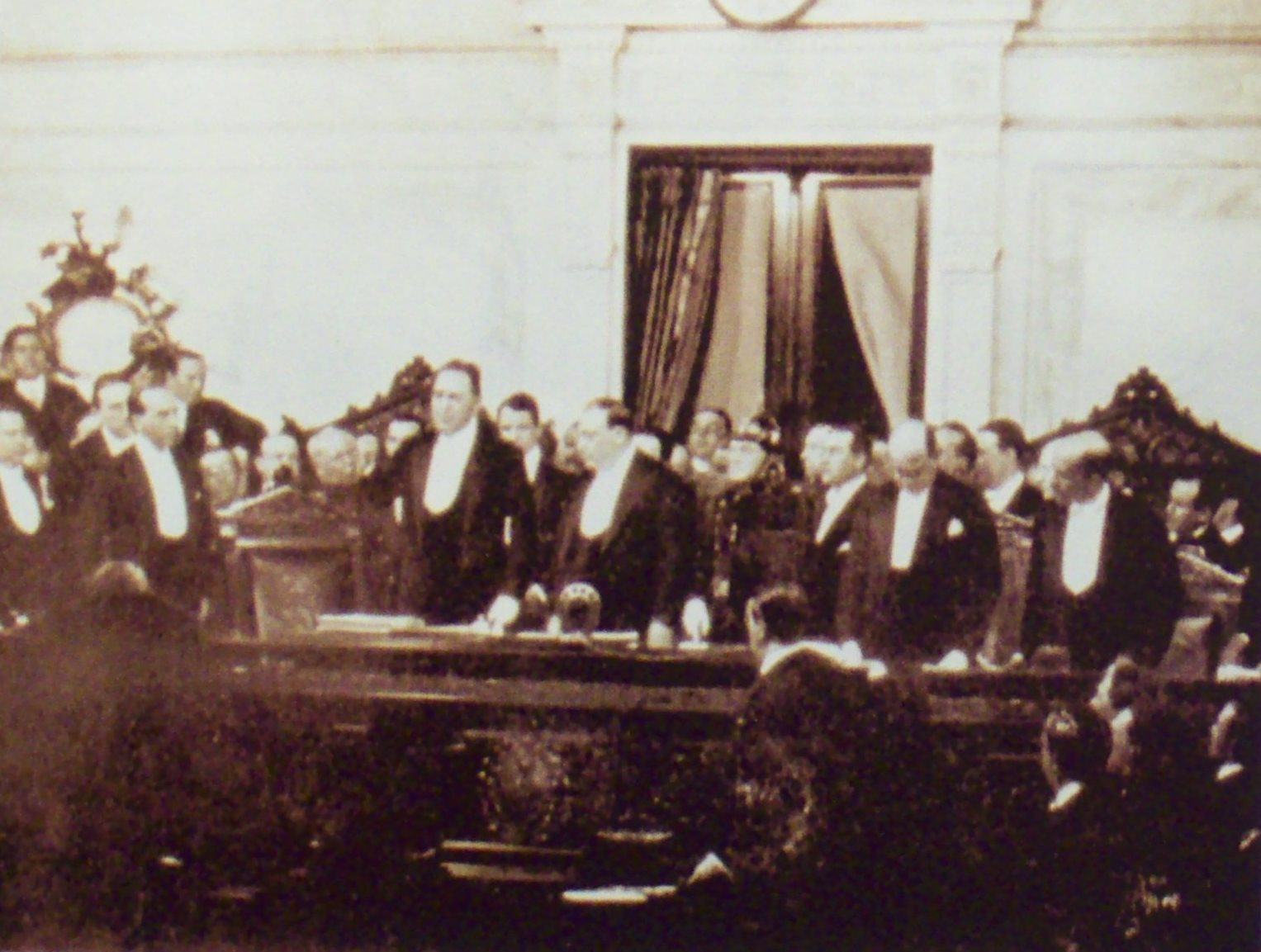
Hipólito Yrigoyen before the National Congress upon assuming office in 1916.

=== Overview ===
Conservative forces dominated Argentine politics until 1916, when their traditional rivals, the Radicals, led by Hipólito Yrigoyen, won control of the government through the 1916 presidential election, the first national elections in Argentine history conducted by secret ballot (and compulsory voting), only for men, established by the Sáenz Peña Law of 1912. 745,000 citizens were allowed to vote, on a total population of 7.5 million (women and immigrants, who constituted most of the population, were not allowed to vote), of which 400,000 abstained themselves. Yrigoyen, however, only obtained 45% of the votes, which did not allow him a majority in Parliament, where the conservatives remained the first force. Thus, on 80 draft laws proposed by the executive, only 26 were voted by the conservative majority. The moderate agricultural reform was refused by the Parliament, as well as a tax on interests and the creation of a Bank of the Republic (which was to have the missions of the current Central Bank).

The Constitution mandated an indirect system via provincial electoral colleges and that of the Federal Capital; inhabitants of the national territories could not vote. The Radical Civic Union won six of the fifteen districts (Federal Capital, Córdoba, Entre Ríos, Mendoza, Santiago del Estero and Tucumán); conservative parties won five (Buenos Aires, Catamarca, San Juan, San Luis and La Rioja); the Progressive Democratic Party won two (Corrientes and Salta); and the dissident Radical Civic Union won Santa Fe. As a result, the UCR lacked its own majority in the electoral colleges and depended on dissident electors from Santa Fe, with whom it prevailed by a single vote. For several days the result remained uncertain, until the dissident UCR decided to support the ticket of Hipólito Yrigoyen–Pelagio Luna.

The electoral victory brought to positions of state leadership a broad social sector that had until then been excluded from public office. These were middle sectors without great economic resources or connections to the upper classes. The presence of officials “without a surname” became a frequent subject of jokes in the conservative press. Throughout his government, he often had to rely on decrees, since many initiatives sent to Congress did not pass. Only after the 1918 legislative elections did the Radical Civic Union obtain a majority in the lower house. Prior to that, the government had submitted several projects that were not approved, including the expropriation of national-flag ocean-going ships, the construction of a shipyard, and reconstruction of access channels to the river ports of Rosario and Buenos Aires.

During his administration, Yrigoyen promoted a series of policies that together implied a transformative tendency. Between 1916 and 1930, GDP expanded at an average annual rate of 4.34%.

Despite this conservative opposition, the Radical Civic Union (UCR), with their emphasis on fair elections and democratic institutions, opened their doors to Argentina's expanding middle class as well as to social groups previously excluded from power. Yrigoyen's policy was to "fix" the system, by enacting necessary reforms which would enable the agroindustrial export model to preserve itself. It altered moderate social reforms with repression of the social movements. A student movement started at the University of Córdoba, which eventually led to the University Reform of 1918, which quickly spread to the rest of America. In May '68, French students recalled the Córdoba movement.

Thus, on one hand, the Tragic Week of January 1919, during which the Argentine Regional Workers' Federation (FORA, founded in 1901) had called for a general strike after a police shooting, ended up in 700 killed and 4,000 injured. General Luis delle Piane marched on Buenos Aires to re-establish civil order. Despite being called for by some to initiate a coup against Yrigoyen, he remained loyal to the President, at the sole condition that the latter would allow him a free hand on the repression of the demonstrations. Social movements thereafter continued in the Forestal British company, where about 600 people (workers and their families) were massacred, and in Patagonia, where Hector Varela headed the military repression, assisted by the Argentine Patriotic League, killing 1,500.

On the other hand, Yrigoyen's administration enacted the Labor Code establishing the right to strike in 1921, implemented minimum wages laws and collective contracts. It also initiated the creation of the Dirección General de Yacimientos Petrolíferos Fiscales (YPF), the oil state company, in June 1922. Radicalism rejected class struggle and vouched for social conciliation.

=== Relations with conservative governments ===
During the first government of Hipólito Yrigoyen, the Radical Party was in the minority in Congress: in the Chamber of Deputies 101 members were radicals and 129 opposition members, while in the Senate only 2 of 58 were radicals.

=== Federal interventions in the provinces ===
Hipólito Yrigoyen made extensive use of the power of federal intervention in the provinces, usually by decree, taking advantage of parliamentary recess to bypass the Senate approval required by the Constitution. By the end of his first term in 1922, he had intervened in all provinces (then fourteen), except Santa Fe; some were intervened three times. In total, he decreed nineteen provincial interventions. Nine affected conservative-governed provinces (Buenos Aires, Corrientes, Mendoza and Jujuy in 1917; La Rioja, Catamarca, Salta and Santiago del Estero in 1918; San Juan in 1919), and ten affected radical-governed provinces (Córdoba in 1917; San Luis in 1919; Salta and Jujuy in 1921; Tucumán in 1917 and 1920; Mendoza in 1918 and 1920; and San Juan twice in 1921).

=== Economic policy ===
YPF laid the foundations of Argentine economic nationalism.

Hipólito Yrigoyen believed that Argentina should manage its own currency, its own credit and the commercialization of its production, as well as the exploitation and distribution of energy and transport. To this end, he planned a State Central Bank, in order to nationalize foreign trade, managed by the grain exporters, founded YPF and imposed controls on the concessions of foreign companies that managed the railways. In railway matters, rigorous controls were imposed on the railways in British hands, especially with regard to tariffs and the setting of capital accounts; in addition, the works of the State Railways were promoted, seeking an outlet to the Pacific to facilitate the transport of the production of the northwest and southwest-central parts of the country to reach Peru, Chile and Bolivia.

The historian of radicalism Gabriel del Mazo says that Yrigoyen's government was characterized by its "Land and Oil Plan", in which the State reserved for itself a decisive interventionist role. Radicalism showed an economic tendency that departed from classical liberalism, based on the idea of State intervention in the economy, considered an antecedent of the New Deal that Roosevelt would carry out in the United States almost two decades later. Yrigoyen's economic nationalism is clearly set out in the grounds for the veto of the railway law that the conservative opposition managed to pass in 1920, where he says:

The policy of the Executive Branch is to keep in the hands of the State the exploitation of natural sources of wealth, whose products are vital elements of the country's development... The State must acquire an increasingly preponderant position in industrial activities that respond mainly to the provision of public services.

— Hipólito Yrigoyen

However, Yrigoyen had to face in Argentina the problems arising from World War I. His policy was to maintain neutrality, which in economic terms meant continuing to supply the Allies, traditional clients. The nations at war demanded cheap food, as well as some industrial items such as blankets and canned meat, whose exports tripled during the period from 1914 to 1920. By contrast, exports of corn and chilled meat (of better quality than canned meat) stagnated. At the same time, imports of industrial manufactures that had previously been produced in Europe slowed, since the countries taking part in the conflict focused their resources on the war industry. This caused industries to begin emerging to produce those products that had previously been imported. Between 1914 and 1921, trade with the United States grew, since England and the other European countries had nothing to offer Argentina.

When the war began, President Victorino de la Plaza ordered the suspension of the delivery of gold in exchange for banknotes carried out by the Conversion Office, as a palliative for the "banking panic" and to prevent capital flight. This allowed the Argentine currency to maintain a fixed backing in relation to gold. Fourteen million pesos in gold were repatriated; their origin was from legations in Paris and London, where it had been deposited as payment made by European merchants on behalf of Argentine exporters. Thanks to this, the Argentine peso came to have 80% gold backing by the end of Yrigoyen's first government. The government unsuccessfully attempted to create the Bank of the Republic in 1917, a financial entity whose objective would be to regulate the national economy and finances. During the five-year period no debt securities were issued, and the external debt was reduced to 225 000 000 pesos; to achieve this, several public jobs were left vacant in order to reduce government spending. Congress did not pass the income tax whose enactment the government requested in 1919. In that year, a regulation on conciliation and arbitration of labor conflicts was sent to Congress, which established a board chaired by the head of the National Department of Labor (also to be composed of one representative from each party to the conflict), to subject both workers and employers to reaching a viable understanding. Also in 1919, a law was brought before Congress regulating work in logging camps and yerba mate plantations, since the conditions of the workers were inhuman; thus Law 11 728 was approved during the following radical administration in 1925. But it would be vetoed by Marcelo T. de Alvear at the insistence of Congress.

International market prices began to decline very slowly from 1914 onward, while the manufactured products that Argentina imported began to become more expensive in relation to the price of cereals. Thus an increasingly difficult situation was created, leading to a general crisis of the economy, whose greatest expression was the year 1929, in step with the international crisis. With an industry with little development that had been created during World War I but later contracted, a fiscal organization that obtained almost all its resources through customs duties, and an almost normally deficit budget, among other aspects, characterized the Argentine economy during the radical period from 1916 to 1930.

Thus, in the metallurgical sector, the companies Tamet and La Cantábrica emerged; the first began as a small workshop and continued growing until it became the largest metallurgical company in South America in the 1920s. At that time the vehicle fleet was 48 000 units, an average of 187 inhabitants per automobile.

=== Energy policy ===
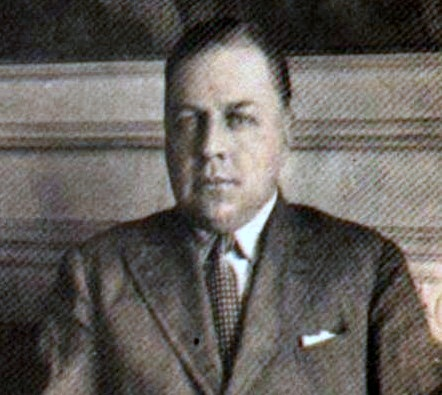
General Enrique Mosconi was in charge of YPF until the 1930 coup d'état.

Two months after assuming the presidency, the government requested authorization from the Congress to take out a loan of 100 000 000 pesos destined for several measures, including promoting the exploitation of YPF. In 1919, the president sent Congress a thirteen-chapter project detailing the legal, technical, economic and financial regime of petroleum. The project aimed to establish the principle of State ownership of oil fields. A few days later, another project was added declaring all elements necessary for oil exploitation to be of public utility. However, these initiatives were stalled in Congress for some time. In 1921, the Executive Branch sent a message to Congress insisting on the approval of the aforementioned projects, but the message was unsuccessful. In response, Yrigoyen issued a decree organizing the General Directorate of YPF under the Ministry of Agriculture. Despite the significant petroleum works, Yrigoyen did not achieve the nationalization of hydrocarbons; however, he laid the groundwork to prevent agreements contrary to local economic independence.

With State support and financing, Mosconi promoted the growth of YPF with the aim of achieving self-sufficiency in petroleum, vital for the country’s autonomous development, and promoted measures aimed at reducing competition between YPF and foreign companies. He achieved the construction of a refinery in La Plata, which freed the country from the purchase of gasoline. A few months after its opening, aviation fuel production began. This industrial plant was the tenth largest refinery in the world.

Carlos Madariaga, a member of YPF’s board, financed some works for YPF with his own fortune. Thanks to this, gasoline production, which was nonexistent in 1922, reached the point where in 1928 YPF sold 100 000 000 liters of that fuel, in addition to 25 000 000 liters of kerosene. Meanwhile, Standard Oil obtained concessions in 1925 from conservative sectors in Salta, but the Yrigoyen-aligned governor Julio Cornejo annulled them in 1928. Thanks to the decrees enacted in 1924, the government of Alvear gradually restricted exploitation concessions held by private companies, while simultaneously delimiting extensive oil reserve areas to be exploited by the national entity directed by Mosconi. Legislators, mostly Yrigoyenist radicals, believed that oil should be nationalized and that a State monopoly should be established for its exploitation. Ultimately, oil nationalization was voted for by Yrigoyenists, antipersonalists, socialists, independent socialists and even certain conservative sectors. By 1929, near the end of the radical period, the private oil-producing companies were the Railway Company, the Anglo-Persian Oil Company (both British capital), Standard Oil (U.S. capital), Astra (German and Argentine capital), and Royal Dutch Shell (Dutch capital). YPF produced virtually the same amount of oil as all these companies combined.

Mosconi set out to break the trusts when, while serving as Director of the Army Aeronautical Service in 1922, the West India Oil (a subsidiary of Standard Oil of New Jersey) demanded advance payment for aviation fuel. Mosconi said of this episode:

Note that the Army Aeronautical Service does not owe your company a cent; that it is a solvent military division dependent on the Ministry of War, and therefore I am not only surprised by your statements and demands, but I consider them impertinent and I do not accept them. (...)

There, at that very desk, I swore to myself to cooperate by all legal means to break the trusts.

— Enrique Mosconi.

=== Land policy ===
Thanks to a somewhat more open colonization policy, during this period a proportionally larger number of tenant farmers became landowners than in the conservative period. However, the rural population declined: from 42% in 1914 to 32% in 1930. It was composed of small farmers in cereal-producing provinces, laborers on large estates in livestock areas, and semi-industrial workers in regions where sugar cane, timber, yerba mate, vines and cotton were produced; however, this sector was subject to very low living standards and had few opportunities for economic advancement. In contrast, in cities, the population increased from 58% to 68% between 1914 and 1930. In addition, economic prospects and educational opportunities for their children enabled many descendants of immigrants to rise rapidly into the middle classes.

The enormous influx of agricultural colonies, the proliferation of farms, the intensification of cultivation through the sharecropping system, and the urban localization of trade and emerging industries made it necessary to address various interconnected rural and urban problems: agrarian reform and labor issues. Yrigoyen adopted measures benefiting small rural producers. Public lands had been the greatest desire of the Argentine oligarchic class; railway owners had benefited from acquiring land around their railways thanks to an 1862 law, later reselling it at higher prices to land companies that were merely parallel enterprises. Yrigoyen opposed continued sales of public land, instead seeking to preserve this source of wealth for the State. Thus, the government forced those who had illegally occupied lands to return them, paying fees for the time they had occupied them. The Banco Hipotecario Nacional experienced remarkable growth by opening lines of credit for rural producers.

The government succeeded in passing a series of rural lease laws (Laws 11.156 and 11.170) to protect settlers and small farmers against large landowners. In the same direction, it reorganized the Banco Hipotecario Nacional to support small rural proprietors with subsidized credit. In 1918, for the first time, the State intervened as the sole seller of grain harvests abroad, with Argentina setting the sale prices.

=== Railways and transport ===
One month after taking office, President Hipólito Yrigoyen decreed the cancellation of 10 000 km of imaginary railway lines whose construction deadlines had expired, which hindered the expansion of the State network. The policy of readjusting the companies was completed in July 1919, when the capital accounts of the Central Argentine Railway, Buenos Aires to the Pacific Railway, Transandine, Gran Oeste Argentino Railway, Southern and the Central Córdoba Railway were officially established. In August 1921, fare increases that had been implemented without authorization were annulled. Following an Executive investigation, the companies admitted their error, and the government ordered them to refund the excess amounts charged. The government attempted to send Congress a bill for the construction of the Huaytiquina railway, but due to delays in Parliament, Yrigoyen decided to issue a decree to begin construction on March 12, 1921. In July 1922, the Noel-Barros Jarpa treaty was signed with Chile to coordinate work on railway lines via Huaytiquina or Socompa in the north and Zapala in the south. The railway works took thirty years to complete.

In a bill sent to Congress in 1916, the Executive Branch requested authorization to issue a loan of one hundred million pesos to, among other things, acquire ships for the National merchant navy, as well as to create YPF; however, the project failed in Parliament and Yrigoyen had to resort to decrees to obtain new ships. At the beginning of 1918, he ordered by decree the purchase of the German ship Bahía Blanca of 13 000 tons, and shortly afterward five more were acquired, totaling 32 000 tons. Old decommissioned ships were refurbished for use in the merchant navy.

He promoted a policy of expansion and strengthening of State railways, and issued measures aimed at regulating powerful foreign railway companies when he vetoed a law passed by the opposition to create a mixed railway company. He carried out the project known as the Train to the Clouds (Salta Province), part of the General Belgrano Railway, connecting Salta with the Pacific Ocean at Antofagasta (Chile), through the Andes, a major feat of engineering. Tariffs were regulated and capital accounts were established, as these companies maintained false accounting, declaring low profits and high costs. In addition, the works of the State Railways were promoted, seeking an outlet to the Pacific to facilitate transport from the northwest and southwest-central regions to Peru, Chile and Bolivia. The concession of 10 000 km of railway lines under construction was annulled. During the railway strike of 1917, employers advised Yrigoyen to replace workers with naval machinists, but the president refused, accepting the right to strike. The railway network grew from 32 500 km in 1914 to 40 000 km in 1929.

=== Education policy ===
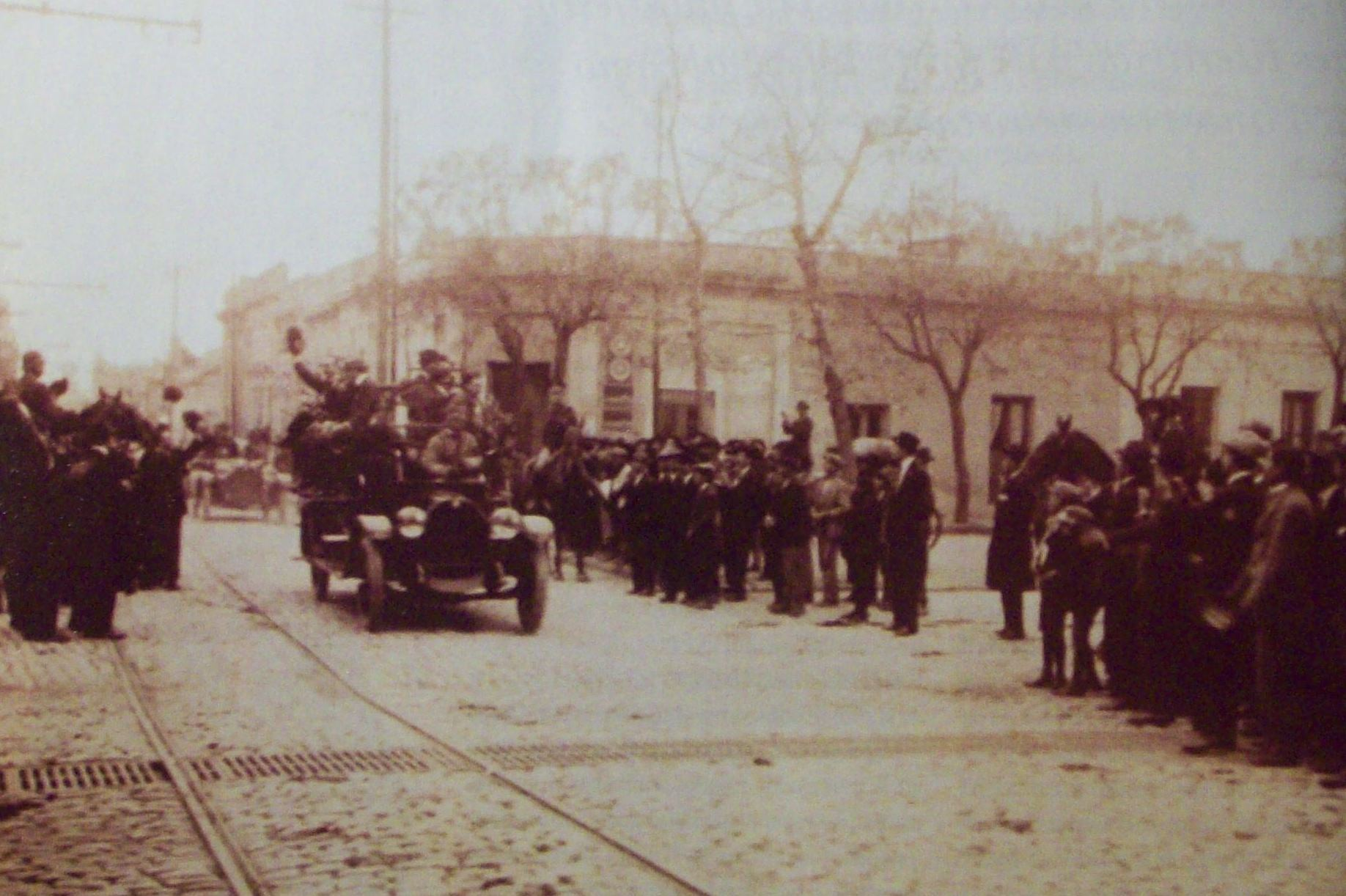
University students being transported by police, 1918.

In the city of Buenos Aires, thirty-seven secondary schools and twelve schools of arts and trades were founded. In addition, 3,126 primary schools were built throughout Argentine territory. During the six years of government, school enrollment increased by more than four hundred thousand. Evening secondary education was introduced, with strong attendance from the working class. In the 1920s, the standardization of teachers and students in public schools through the use of the white smock—used since the beginning of the century—became widespread, symbolizing democratic austerity, hygiene, morality, bodily discipline and ethnic purity, while an incipient welfare state developed in parallel, distributing food and goods free of charge among the most needy population.

=== Labor situation ===
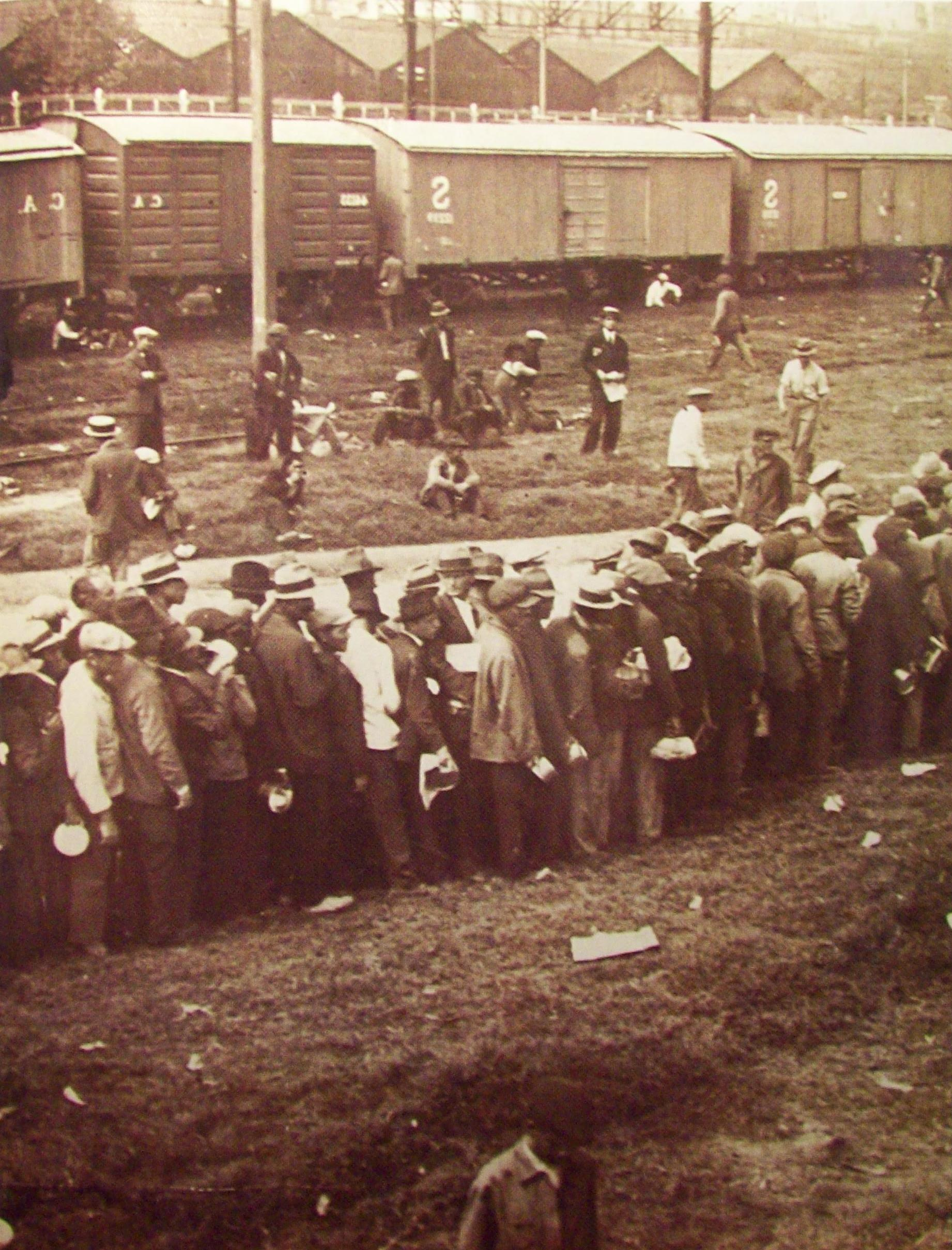
Group of workers in one of the first shantytowns of the city of Buenos Aires in the 1930s. The housing shortage remains one of the country's major problems.

In 1915, the Argentine Regional Workers' Federation (FORA) held its historic Ninth Congress, unifying under the majority leadership of the revolutionary syndicalist current, which would adopt a policy of dialogue and rapprochement with the radical government.

Yrigoyen adopted a novel policy of state mediation in labor conflicts, promoting their resolution through collective bargaining or arbitration awards when no agreement was reached. Radical historian Gabriel del Mazo described the new approach that radicalism brought to labor conflicts, recounting Yrigoyen's response to the employers' delegation that had demanded repression of the railway strike of 1917:

Is that the solution you bring to the government of your country; is that the measure you come to propose to the government that has emerged from the very heart of democracy, after thirty years of dominance and privilege? Understand, gentlemen, that privileges have ended in the country and that from now on, the armed forces of the Nation will move only in defense of its honor or its integrity. The government will not destroy by force this strike, which represents the demand of unheard suffering.

— Hipólito Yrigoyen.

During Yrigoyen's government, strikes multiplied tenfold and lasted longer (see chart), a fact also used by conservative sectors and media to denounce "social chaos" and demand repressive policies. Yrigoyen responded by mediating in conflicts, as occurred in his successful interventions in the maritime workers' strikes of 1916/1917 and the railway workers' strike of 1917.

In labor legislation, the Yrigoyen government introduced several bills, including labor and social welfare codes, which were not approved by Congress, except for the home work law (No. 10,505), approved in 1918, and the law on work in logging camps and yerba mate plantations (No. 11,728), approved in 1925.

In housing, the government amended the Civil Code to establish limits on residential lease contracts (laws 11,156 and 11,157, known as the "Rent Law"), freezing rents, setting minimum terms and establishing time periods for evicting properties. This regime would be modified in 1933 to ensure tenant protection. In 1917, Law No. 10,284 on the family protection regime, better known as homestead, was passed, establishing that essential goods and work tools needed to ensure family subsistence could not be seized. Laws 11,156 and 11,157 imposed minimum lease terms and benefited tenants by giving them time periods to vacate the property.

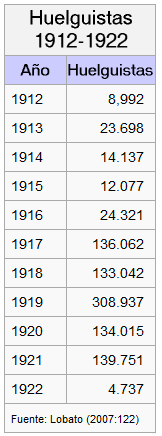
The number of strikers multiplied tenfold during Yrigoyen's government (1916-1922).

Yrigoyen maintained very conflictive relations with the Socialist Party, which accused him of being authoritarian and demagogic, as well as with the anarcho-syndicalist current, which controlled the FORA of the Fifth Congress, and the communist current, created in 1919. By contrast, he maintained close relations with revolutionary syndicalism, the majority union current that controlled the FORA of the Ninth Congress and the railway and maritime unions, which were the most powerful. The radical government's favoritism toward the revolutionary syndicalist sector earned Argentina an international sanction during the founding conference of the International Labour Organization.

Together with democratic freedoms and the government's tolerant policy toward unions and strikes, unionism expanded exponentially during Yrigoyen's first government. Whereas at the end of 1915 the FORA had 51 unions and 20,000 pesos in contributions, five years later the number had risen to 731 unions and contributions to 700,000 pesos. The labor movement also spread throughout the country, organizing even rural workers in places as distant as Patagonia, the quebracho forests of the Southern Chaco, and the yerba mate plantations of Corrientes and Misiones. The dissolution of FORA IX and the founding of the Unión Ferroviaria in 1922, which became the axis of Argentine unionism during the following decades, would gradually open a new stage in Argentine unionism, more oriented toward collective bargaining and political participation with the aim of gaining political power.

In the first two years of government, during World War I, real wages lost 30% of the purchasing power they had in 1915, but strikes, the strengthening of unionism and new labor laws drove real wages upward from 1918 until, in 1922, they reached a 37% increase over their 1915 purchasing power.

==== Workers' massacres ====
During the radical governments, the largest workers' massacres in Argentine history occurred. Thousands of workers were murdered, executed, tortured and disappeared in several repressive episodes. Radicalism combined a novel mediation policy to promote collective bargaining between employers and unions to resolve labor conflicts, but also, in several cases where the government did not know how to handle the situation, repressive action took place, including mass killings and the activity of far-right terrorist parapolice organizations such as the Argentine Patriotic League, led by radical leader Manuel Carlés, and the National Labor Association.

===== Tragic Week =====
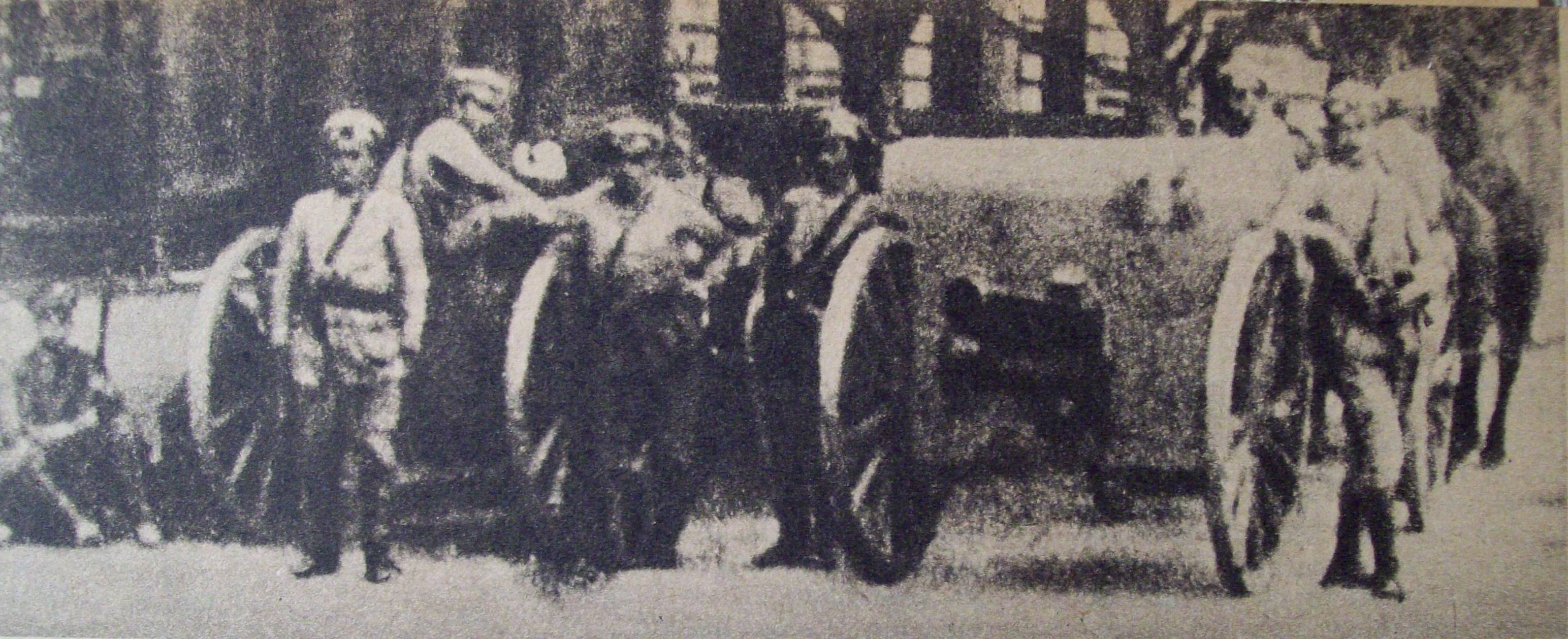
Cannons at the corner of Congress, during the Tragic Week, 1919.

In December 1918, a strike had begun at the Vasena metallurgical factory, located in the San Cristóbal neighborhood of Buenos Aires. The government intervened and proposed an agreement that included most of the workers' demands, but the company proved extremely intransigent and sought to wear down the strikers. The strike, however, spread with the support of neighborhood solidarity. Tension grew for a month, with clashes, attempts to murder delegates, and several injuries.

The metalworkers' union belonged to the anarchist FORA, which was directly opposed to Yrigoyenist "democratism" and social dialogue, while awaiting a social outbreak that would overthrow capitalism. During the conflict, the government negotiated with the FORA IX, of revolutionary syndicalist tendency and close to the government, but this majority central had no members at Vasena.

On 7 January 1919, a group of strikebreakers, guarded by more than one hundred police officers, confronted the strike picket blocking the factory entrance, and the police unleashed a pandemonium, firing more than two thousand bullets in two hours, leaving five people dead and more than forty wounded. Three of the dead were in their homes. The police report stated that only four police officers had been injured: a lieutenant with a "puncture wound", a cadet with a "bruised toe", an officer with a "bite on the little finger" and another officer with a "bruise on the forehead".

In response to the massacre, the FORA of the Fifth Congress declared a general strike, joined by unions from both federations, and the city was paralyzed. On 9 January, tens of thousands gathered to bury their dead at La Chacarita Cemetery. The funeral procession was attacked several times along the way, and upon reaching the cemetery the police fired indiscriminately on the crowd, killing fifty people and wounding four hundred others. Outrage over the slaughter produced a popular insurrection that expelled the police from the working-class neighborhoods.

That same night, Yrigoyen ordered the Army to regain control of the city, under the command of General Luis Dellepiane, a military officer loyal to Yrigoyen who had participated in the radical revolution of 1905. For three days, Buenos Aires was a free-fire zone for the repressive action of the Army, the police and groups of armed civilians and "radical civic guards", who a few days later would organize under the name Argentine Patriotic League. In the Jewish neighborhood of Once, the repressive forces carried out the only pogrom (massacre of Jews) ever committed on the American continent, calling for "hunting Russians". Amid the massacre, the phrase "I, Argentine" appeared, used as a safe-conduct to save one's life. The toll was about 800 unidentified dead: elderly people, women, children and men. There were also dozens of disappeared people, thousands wounded, and more than 50,000 detained. Workers' homes, synagogues, union and party premises, newspapers, Jewish popular libraries and cooperatives were burned. The government detained and tortured thousands of citizens, such as the Jewish immigrant Pinie Wald, who was falsely accused of being the leader of a Judeo-communist revolution, and allowed parapolice groups to use police stations as operational bases. Once released, Pinie Wald recounted the torture and outrages he suffered in the book Koschmar (Pesadilla), written in Yiddish and translated into Spanish only in 1987.

The two FORAs were unable to act in any way to stop the massacre. The anarchist FORA because it opposed all contact with the government or deputies and simply confined itself to promoting insurrection, and FORA IX because it was hesitant and had no control over the unions or influence over the strikers.

There is consensus among scholars that Yrigoyen was overtaken by the hardest and most criminal sectors acting within and outside radicalism. But there is also consensus that Yrigoyen was responsible both for the decisions he made and those he did not make, including the cover-up of the events and the impunity of the killers. A radical historian such as Gabriel del Mazo attributed responsibility to "the lurking political and plutocratic oligarchy, whose aspiration was directed toward overthrowing the constitutional government through a military operation under the pretext of restoring disturbed order". Another radical historian, Félix Luna, stated generically that "Yrigoyen was forced to take energetic measures to guarantee the population's peace". After the massacre, the government publicly congratulated the troops that carried out the repression, and high society organized a collection to reward them with money.

Almost one hundred years after the massacre, the victims still have not been officially remembered. In 1972, Julio Godio wrote a book titled La semana trágica, recovering the event for collective memory. More recently, Herman Szwarcbart's documentary Un pogrom en Buenos Aires (2007) recorded testimonies of the degree of barbarity, class hatred and racism of that action.

===== Rebel Patagonia =====
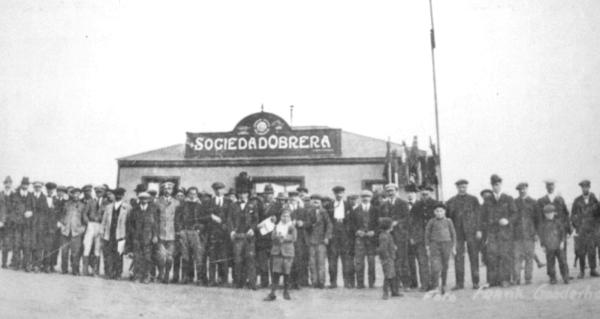
Workers on strike during the Patagonia rebelde.

In November 1920, a strike by rural laborers and meatpacking workers broke out in Santa Cruz. Immediately, the largest ranchers, such as Menéndez Behety, the Rural Society, the British meatpacking plants and even the embassy of Great Britain requested intervention by the national government to end the strike.

The strike was led mainly by the Río Gallegos Workers' Society, created in 1918. Its secretary general was known as "Gallego" Soto, a Spanish anarchist who belonged to the anarchist FORA (FORA V). As the conflict spread, other workers' societies established in the other towns of Santa Cruz joined the strike. Three union currents (anarchists, socialists and revolutionary syndicalists) came into conflict with each other, but the anarchists of FORA V predominated. The conflict was full of violent acts, from beatings, torture and murders of unionists by the police and the parapolice group Argentine Patriotic League, to the occupation of ranches and the taking of hostages by the strikers.

Yrigoyen gave orders to mediate in the conflict and reach an agreement. To do so, he sent a new Yrigoyenist governor, Ángel Yza, and shortly afterward Colonel Héctor Benigno Varela, commanding an Army regiment. Yza and Colonel Varela managed to bring the parties together and reach an agreement formalized through an award by the governor, accepted by the unions and employers, which was finally approved on 22 February 1921.

Immediately after the troops withdrew, the ranchers disregarded the agreement and retaliated using parapolice groups. In October, a new wave began of occupations of ranches, towns and hostage-taking.

At the end of 1921, there was a sharp drop in the price of wool, causing a large amount of accumulated stock and a major fall in the product's price. The greatest problem was that the workers had a coming shearing season, which worsened the situation. To avoid this, the workers again occupied the ranches, once more cautiously and without violence; some owners even joined the demand because they considered it just.

In November, Yrigoyen again sent Colonel Varela, commanding 200 soldiers, this time with the order to "pacify" Patagonia, granting him a proclamation of the death penalty to apply to strikers for subversion. Historians debate what weight the Chilean presence in the conflict, especially of Carabineros (police) personnel, had in the decision to intensify repression against the workers to such a degree.

Between 11 November 1921 and 10 January 1922, the Army proceeded to arrest and shoot hundreds of strikers, whom Osvaldo Bayer estimates reached 1,500. The bodies were burned and buried without markers. Yrigoyen's government never provided a list of the people executed or produced any report on the operations.

===== La Forestal =====
In 1919, the workers of the British company La Forestal, producer of quebracho and tannin in northern Santa Fe Province, built a union organization affiliated with the 9th-Congress FORA and declared a general strike that ended with the signing of an advanced collective agreement.

In the following two years, the company failed to comply with the agreement and succeeded in getting the radical government of Santa Fe to create a police force financed by the company to protect its interests, called the Flying Gendarmerie. Simultaneously, the parapolice organization Argentine Patriotic League settled in the area, while the labor movement was divided by struggles between the different 9th-congress and Fifth-congress (anarchist) FORAs.

Under those conditions, in December 1920 La Forestal began a prolonged lockout, closing its factories and dismissing thousands of workers, exposing several towns (Villa Guillermina, La Gallareta, Villa Ana and Tartagal) to starvation. On 29 January 1921, a widespread social outbreak occurred in the region, with dozens of armed clashes in towns and forests for three months. The outbreak was harshly repressed by the Flying Gendarmerie and the parapolice Patriotic Legion; about 600 workers died in the confrontation, and there were also cases of torture, rape and the burning of homes by police forces. Only in November 1922 did La Forestal reopen its factories. By then, the Tannin Union and every trace of union organization among the quebracho workers had disappeared.

Three decades later, with the quebracho forests felled, La Forestal would definitively close its plants in Argentina, causing the greatest social and ecological disaster that a company had generated in Argentine history. A 2004 report by the National Secretariat of Environment and Sustainable Development and the National Agricultural Technology Institute (INTA) studied in detail the devastation of natural forests and the process of desertification in Santa Fe Province, caused in the north of the province mainly by La Forestal. As a result of the type of logging carried out in Santa Fe by La Forestal and other companies, the province lost 86% of its forests.

This massacre, which had been publicized by the film Quebracho (1974), by Ricardo Wüllicher, has been studied in detail by Alejandro Jasinski in the book Revuelta obrera y masacre en La Forestal: sindicalismo y violencia empresaria en tiempos de Yrigoyen.

===== Napalpí massacre =====
In 1924, during the presidency of Marcelo T. de Alvear, a major labor protest by Indigenous Qom and Mocoví people took place in the locality of Napalpí, in the then national territory of Chaco, over the undignified conditions of cotton production. The protest was repressed by the police, killing about 200 people. At least 700 victims, including women, elderly people and children. Those who did not die from police bullets were beheaded with machetes and axes. It was one of the largest massacres committed in Argentina during the 20th century. As in the other cases, no investigation was opened and no list of victims was made public at the time. In 2014, ninety years later, the Argentine state, through the Public Prosecutor's Office, investigated the possible crimes against humanity committed in Napalpí for four years, and requested the opening of a trial for truth, because all potential culprits had already died.

=== University Reform of 1918 ===
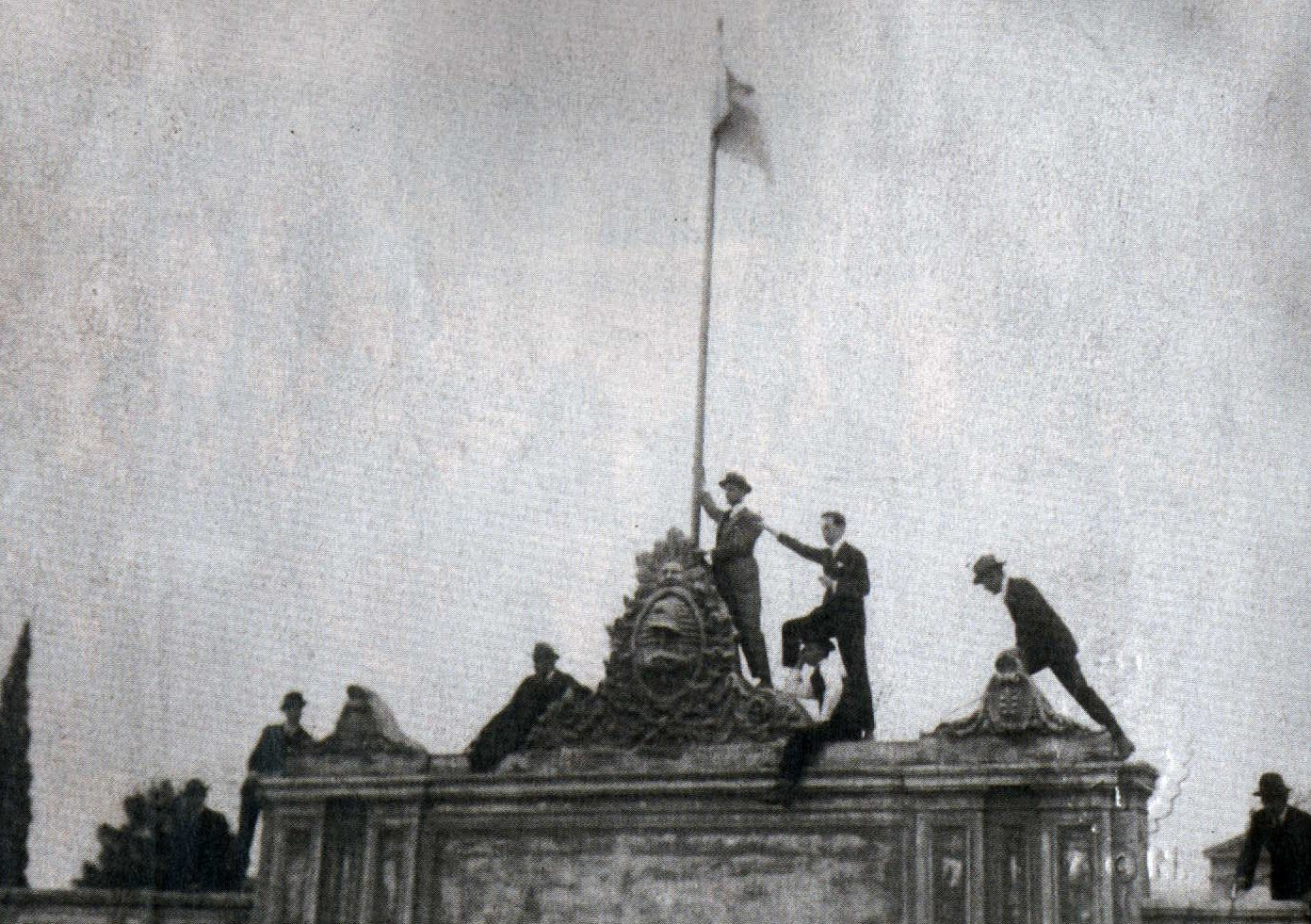
In 1918 the University Reform movement began.

Yrigoyen viewed sympathetically an existing movement to reform the university regime, calling for autonomy for each university and government by representatives elected by professors, students and graduates, within the framework of democratizing university education. Therefore, he created new institutions of higher education so that the middle classes would have greater access to university. As Gabriel del Mazo, one of the student leaders and later a UCR leader, explained:

His government belonged to the new spirit, which identified with the just aspirations of the students, and the University had to be brought into line with the state of consciousness reached by the Republic.

— Gabriel del Mazo.

The president appointed José Nicolás Matienzo as interventor, who took charge of reforming the statutes of the University of Córdoba and established the election of new authorities. However, Doctor Nores, opposed to the reform, won, provoking student opposition; after the failure of Matienzo's intervention, the students decided that the strike would be indefinite. On 21 June 1918, a manifesto titled La juventud argentina de Córdoba a los hombres libres de Sud América was released. In July 1918, the radical government sent Congress a law establishing the three levels of instruction. The University of the Littoral was created at the request of the National Congress of University Students, and the University of Tucumán was nationalized.

The university reform was projected into other countries of Latin America, such as Peru – where the reformist leader was Víctor Raúl Haya de la Torre – Mexico, Colombia, Cuba, Chile, Uruguay, Guatemala, the Dominican Republic, Costa Rica, Bolivia and Venezuela.

=== World War I and Foreign Relations ===
Meanwhile, the Radicals continued Argentina's neutrality policy during World War I, despite the United States' urge to push them into declaring war on the Triple Alliance. Neutrality enabled Argentina to export goods to Europe, in particular to Great Britain, as well as to issue credit to the belligerent powers.

Hipólito Yrigoyen's international policy was the subject of strong debate, including within radicalism itself. His policy was based mainly on the principles of self-determination and equality of nations before the great powers, and neutralism toward the world war.

Facing World War I (1914–1918), Yrigoyen continued the neutrality already decided by the previous president, Victorino de la Plaza, and maintained it even after the United States entered the war in 1917 and pressed for all American countries to enter. Neutralism was also adopted by other Latin American nations such as Colombia, Venezuela, Mexico and Chile. Yrigoyen attempted to have the countries of Latin America maintain an autonomous position of bloc neutrality, and for this purpose convened a conference of nations in Buenos Aires in 1917. But opposition from the United States, which considered Yrigoyen pro-German, together with the fact that Brazil had already broken relations with Berlin, caused the attempt to fail. Only Mexico and Colombia agreed to the conference, which was never held.

On 4 April 1917, the civilian schooner Monte Protegido, which was carrying a cargo of flax to the Netherlands, was sunk by a German submarine. A few weeks later, on 22 June 1917, another German submarine sank the civilian Argentine steamship El Toro near Gibraltar, while it was carrying frozen meat, hides, wool, fats and tannin to Genoa. In both cases, radical policy was to demand material and moral reparations from Germany, on the understanding that if it did not do so Argentina would declare war. Germany accepted the Argentine demands and pledged not to sink any more Argentine ships.

In 1917 demonstrators attacked and wrecked the German Club, the German Delegation, and the German Transatlantic Electricity Company. These events, together with news that the German minister in Buenos Aires, Karl von Luxburg, had sent secret telegrams recommending the sinking of Argentine ships "without leaving traces", and insulting references to Foreign Minister Honorio Pueyrredón, led public opinion, as well as many radical leaders, to pressure Yrigoyen to break diplomatic relations with Germany, but the president maintained neutrality.

The diplomatic incident ended only with the expulsion of the German ambassador, Karl von Luxburg. Yrigoyen organized a Conference of Neutral Powers in Buenos Aires, to oppose the United States' attempt to bring American states in the European war, and also supported Sandino's resistance in Nicaragua.

The radical government faced another international incident when the British ambassador in Buenos Aires, Reginald Tower, stated that Great Britain would give trade preferences to allied countries such as Brazil and Uruguay. The president asked the minister to appear at his office to explain his statements and, faced with the threat of expulsion from the country, Tower retracted them.

Yrigoyen's neutralist stance was highly criticized, both by the domestic opposition and by forces outside the party, which argued that it would lead to the country's isolation. Marcelo T. de Alvear himself, who was Argentine ambassador to France, confronted Yrigoyen, demanding that he adopt a defined position that would allow Argentina to place itself at the head of the Spanish-American countries. The Socialist Party also demanded in Congress that Argentina declare war on Germany in response to the sinking of the ships Toro and Monte Protegido, but the UCR rejected the demand, and Yrigoyen remained inflexible.

Regarding the Treaty of Versailles and the creation of the League of Nations, Argentina's position was to uphold the separation of the two acts: the Treaty was a matter that should be limited to the countries that fought, while the League of Nations, by contrast, should be an equal and voluntary association of all the nations of the world. In addition, at the League of Nations, Yrigoyen instructed the Argentine representatives to request that both victorious and "defeated" nations be treated equally, despite the opposition of some members of the delegation, such as Marcelo T. de Alvear and Fernando Pérez. The rejection of the Argentine position, driven mainly by the European imperial nations, at a time when the peoples of Africa and Asia were still governed by European colonialism, led to the withdrawal of the Argentine delegation from the League.

Yrigoyen sent a bill to forgive the debt that Paraguay had carried since the War of the Triple Alliance (1864-1870), but it did not pass. The next radical government would return to the issue.

By decree, he established 12 October as a national holiday under the name Día de la Raza, in homage to "discovering and conquering Spain", considering "that the discovery of America is the most momentous event humanity has carried out throughout the ages".

In 1918, an agreement was concluded between the Argentine government and those of England and France by which the surplus wheat crop and other cereals, totaling 2,500 tons, were sold at a base price of 250,000,000 gold pesos. Shortly afterward, a similar initiative was attempted, but the Senate rejected it despite the president's insistence. This refusal was a cause of the wool disaster that occurred in Patagonia. A barter agreement exchanging wool for railway materials that was to be concluded with Germany, France and Belgium in 1921 could not be finalized.

Yrigoyen sought to contain the expansionism of large foreign economic groups operating in the country. Faced with the aggressive interventionist policy of the United States in Latin America, he defended the principle of non-intervention, in one case ordering Argentine warships to salute the flag of the Dominican Republic rather than that of the United States, which had raised its own on the island during the 1916 invasion.

In September 1922, Yrigoyen's administration refused to follow the cordon sanitaire policy enacted against the Soviet Union, and, basing itself on the assistance given to Austria after the war, decided to send the USSR 5 million pesos in assistance.

== The Alvear administration (1922–1928) ==
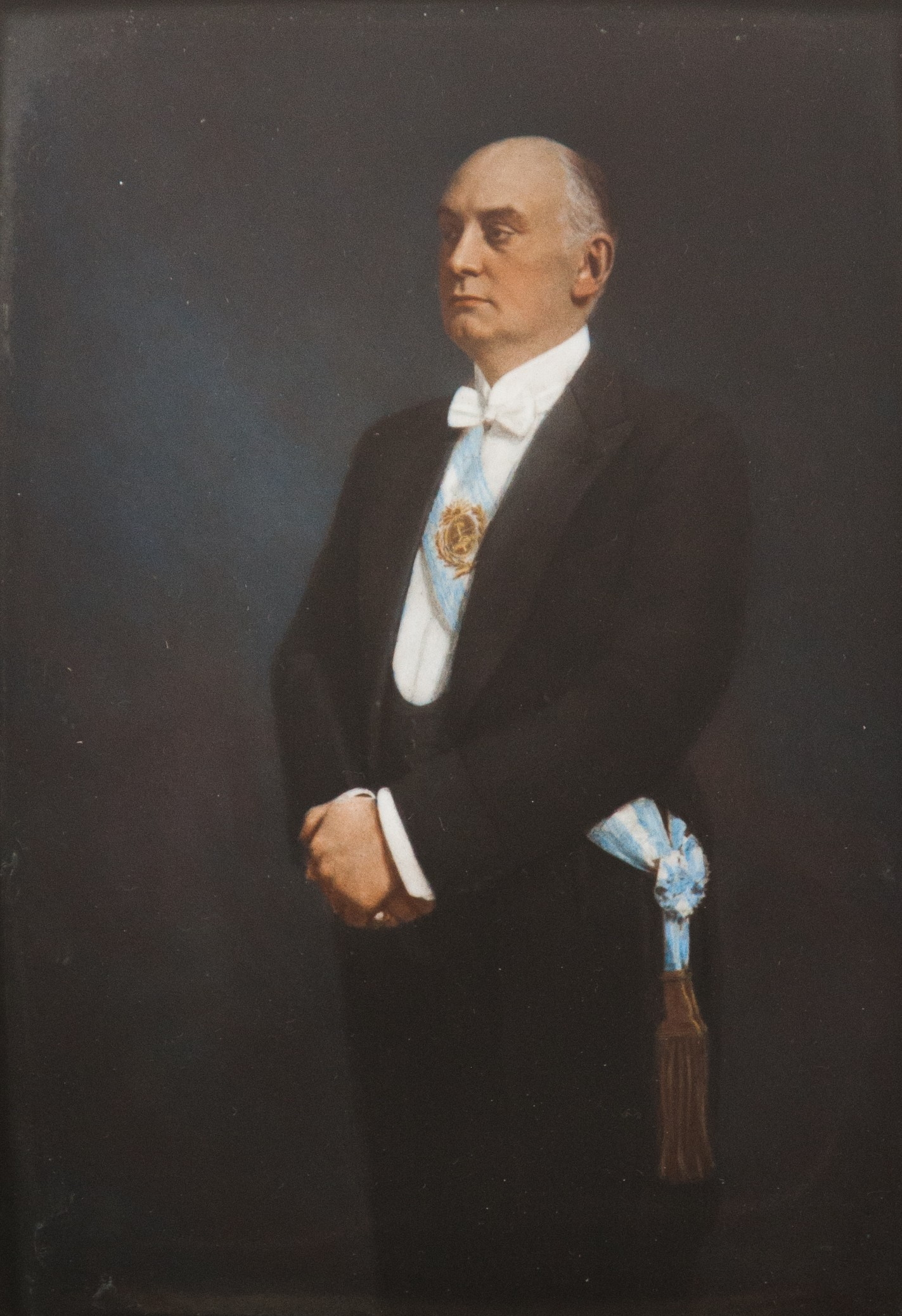
Marcelo T. de Alvear wearing the presidential sash, official portrait, Museo del Bicentenario.

The same year, Yrigoyen was replaced by his rival inside the UCR, Marcelo Torcuato de Alvear, an aristocrat. The elections were held on 2 April 1922. Alvear defeated Norberto Piñero's Concentración Nacional (conservative electoral alliance) with 458,457 votes against 200,080; the Socialist Party obtained 75,000 votes; and the Progressive Democratic Party obtained 75,000 votes. The vice president was Elpidio González. Alvear brought to his cabinet personalities belonging to the traditional ruling classes, such as José Nicolás Matienzo at the Interior Ministry, Ángel Gallardo at Foreign Relations, Agustín P. Justo at the War Ministry, Manuel Domecq García at the Marine and Rafael Herrera Vegas at the Haciendas. Alvera's supporters founded the Unión Cívica Radical Antipersonalista, opposed to Yrigoyen's party.

Marcelo T. de Alvear developed a presidency markedly different in style and content from that of Hipólito Yrigoyen.

Firstly, radicalism during his term showed a clear vocation for dialogue and alliances with other political forces, especially with the socialists and progressive democrats. The presence of radical militants in the cabinet was limited, and ministers and secretaries enjoyed greater autonomy. Minister José Nicolás Matienzo played a coordinating role in the cabinet. Two ministers in Alvear's cabinet would become presidents of Argentina during the Infamous Decade: Agustín P. Justo and Roberto M. Ortiz.

Secondly, certain policies of economic, political and social transformation and labor laws outlined by Yrigoyen's government were softened, if not directly reversed, during Alvear's government. The most extreme case was the University Reform. This did not prevent Alvear's government, however, from sending Congress the bill to nationalize oil, although it never managed to have it approved.

In 1922, the poet Leopoldo Lugones, who had turned towards fascism, made a famous speech in Lima, known as "the time of the sword", in presence of the War Minister and future dictator Agustín P. Justo, which called for a military coup and the establishment of a military dictatorship. The preceding year, the counter-revolutionary Logia General San Martín was founded, and diffused nationalist ideas in the military until its dissolving in 1926. Three years later, the misnamed Liga Republicana (Republican League) was founded by Roberto de Laferrere, on the model of Benito Mussolini's Black shirts in Italy. The Argentinian Right found its major influences in the 19th-century Spanish writer Marcelino Menéndez y Pelayo and in the French royalist Charles Maurras.

On the other end of the political spectrum, the Italian anarchist Severino Di Giovanni headed a propaganda of the deed campaign in support of Sacco and Vanzetti, as well as directing bombings against Fascist Italy's interests in Argentina. He was executed in 1931, after having perpetrated the most important bombing in Argentina, against the Italian consulate in May 1928.

Nevertheless, although to a lesser extent than his predecessor, the new radical adopted several social welfare measures, such as Law No. 11,289 in 1923; although it represented progress toward universal and compulsory retirement, later in 1926 the Industrial Union succeeded in annulling it through the new Law 11.35, arguing that it would be too costly to maintain. The labor movement also complained about it, since workers did not want the 5% corresponding to workers' contributions deducted from their wages. Law No. 11,317, enacted in 1924, prohibited the work of women and minors in the Federal Capital and in the national territories; Pablo Troncoso noted that Article 23 of that law empowered trade-union societies to report and criminally accuse any violation of its provisions. In 1926, a commission headed by the socialist Mario Bravo managed to draft and enact Law No. 11,388, called the "Legal Regime of Cooperative Societies", whose second article expressed the principles of free and voluntary association, promotion of education, and avoidance of privileges for founders. Almost simultaneously, Law No. 11,380, called the law for "promotion of cooperatives", was promulgated, authorizing the Banco de la Nación Argentina and the Mortgage Bank to grant credit to cooperative entities, as well as exempting these societies from national stamp-paper taxes and from taxes on the value of buildings, installations and patents.

Pension laws were also enacted: retirement for bank employees, Laws No. 11,232 and 11,575, and primary school teachers, Law No. 11,312. In addition, Law No. 11,289 created the Social Welfare Fund for retirement of employees and workers; Law No. 11,275 established identification of Argentine industrial goods; and Law No. 11,278 regulated the payment of wages in national currency, to avoid the use of exchange vouchers. Law No. 11,287 established inheritance taxes, which this time produced greater redistribution and served to strengthen popular education. In 1924, teachers' pensions were increased, as they had previously been very low. However, the government practically softened the process of university reform when it intervened in the higher education institutions of La Plata and the Littoral, and enacted an anti-reformist statute for the Buenos Aires institution.

During his presidency, and because of the end of the war, the flow of immigration to Argentina revived. From 1924 to 1929, almost two million people entered the country, of whom 650,000 settled there.

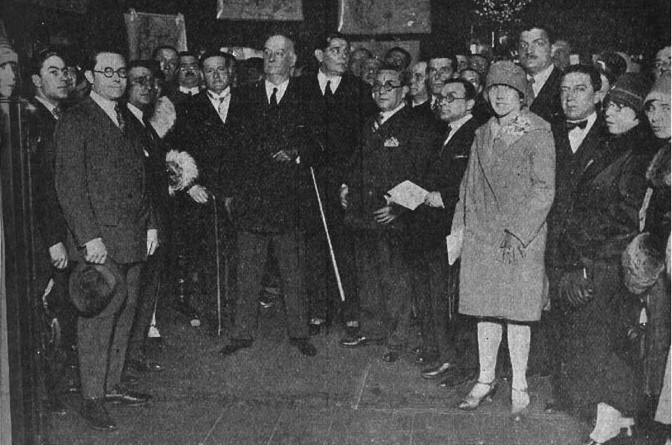
The first Book Fair in Argentina took place in Buenos Aires in September 1928; in the photo, the president is with his ministers Roberto Marcelino Ortiz and José Tamborini, touring it on opening day.

From 1925 onward, there was a very large increase in foreign investment from the United States, carried out through companies related to the meat packing industry, energy distribution and production organizations, and consumer goods. This sudden "invasion" of American capital created competition with capital from the United Kingdom, a rivalry reflected in areas such as transport, between automotive products exported from the United States and British railways. Competition also intensified with meatpacking companies linked to these two countries. These conflicts led to a deterioration in relations with the British. As a result, due to the American-origin loans contracted during the second radical presidency, the public debt grew notably during Alvear's administration compared with Yrigoyen's first presidency; by 1928 it stood at 1,763 million pesos.

When Alvear took office, there was a crisis in the livestock sector, since the frozen meats produced by Argentina were not useful for a war economy such as Europe's; in previous years, frozen meat exports had declined. Breeders with excess cattle had to sell their animals at low prices. Cattle breeders had requested protection in 1921 from the Argentine government against the operations of the meat trusts. For this reason, in 1923 the government enacted three laws, Nos. 11,226, 11,227 and 11,228. The first established a control regime for the meat trade; the second set minimum and maximum sale prices; and the third established a control regime for commercial cattle transactions to prevent vouchers, common in the interior. Thus a state meatpacking plant was created, years later named Lisandro de la Torre. Efforts were made to prevent speculation and establish forms of marketing and control, ensuring supply at reasonable prices.

At the end of Alvear's administration in 1928, the country had more automobiles than France and more telephone lines than Japan.

=== Diversity and division of radicalism ===
==== Yrigoyenism and anti-personalism ====
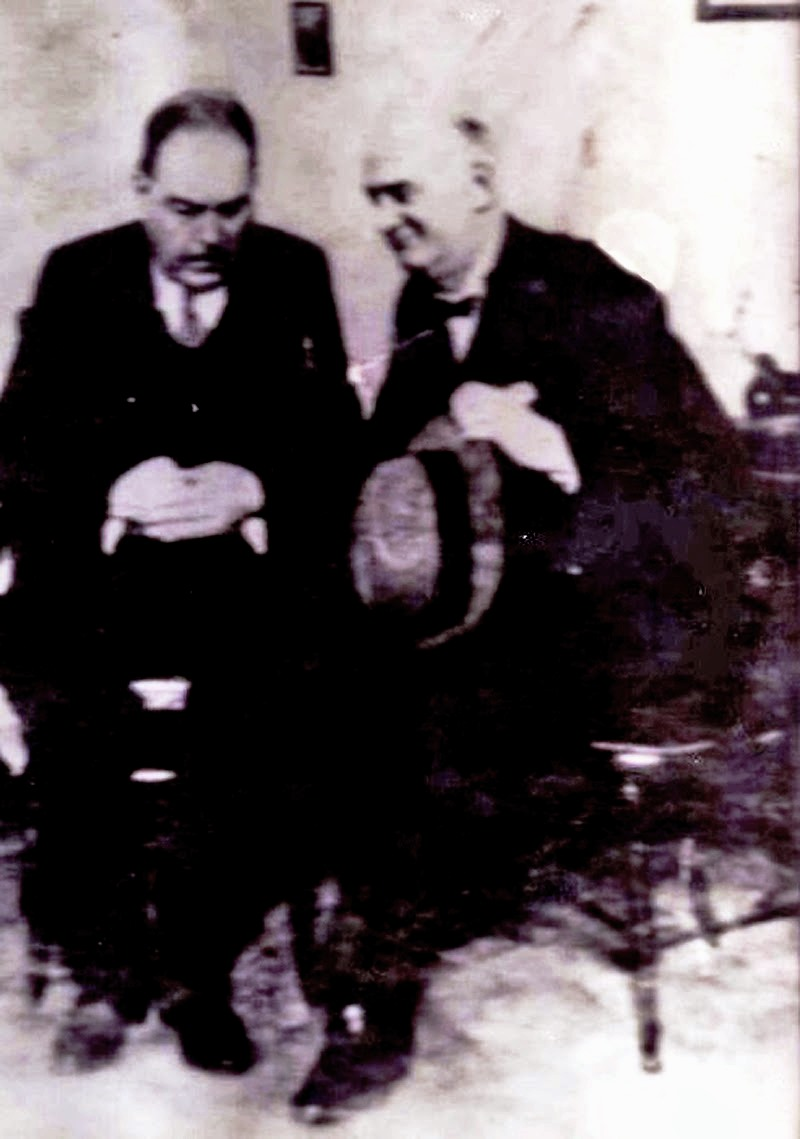
Hipólito Yrigoyen with Marcelo Torcuato de Alvear. In the mid-1920s, radicalism split into Yrigoyenists and antipersonalists.

Yrigoyen imposed a very personal and direct leadership style, in which his ministers appeared to have little autonomy. The opposition, and later a broad sector of the UCR, would strongly criticize this style, which was labeled personalist.

The Radical Civic Union had been internally divided since the beginning of the century between the so-called "Blues" (azules) or "top-hats" (galeritas), of a more conservative tendency and upper-middle-class social origin, very strong in the City of Buenos Aires, and the so-called "Greys" (grises), of a more popular tendency and lower-middle-class social origin, strong in the Buenos Aires Province.

The roots of the confrontation go back to the time of the Radical Revolution of 1893, which divided the party between followers of its founder, Leandro N. Alem, and his nephew, Hipólito Yrigoyen. Many of Alem's followers, such as Francisco Barroetaveña, Martín Torino, Tomás Le Breton, and Emilio Gouchón, joined the ranks of the group opposed to Yrigoyen, forming the basis of future anti-Yrigoyenism. Another radical sector had followed Bernardo de Irigoyen in his governorship of Buenos Aires Province; when they rejoined the main branch of radicalism, several members of this group did not accept Yrigoyen's leadership. Finally, a sector led by Leopoldo Melo confronted Yrigoyen in 1909, opposing the abstentionism that Yrigoyen upheld as the core of his political strategy.

The antipersonalists criticized Yrigoyen's vertical and personalist leadership, as well as his closed personality and reluctance to engage in dialogue. They attached maximum importance to one of the four principles that Leandro Alem had identified as the basis of radicalism: "the impersonality of the coalition".

==== Bloquismo in San Juan ====
The Bloquist Party originated in a major division of the Radical Civic Union in San Juan. Brothers Federico Cantoni and Aldo Cantoni, the former a radical and the latter a socialist, founded the Bloquist Radical Civic Union with a progressive popular program that became widely popular in the province.

Federico Cantoni was elected governor in 1923 and again in 1931.

Bloquismo in San Juan carried out one of the most progressive governmental programs in Argentine history: women's suffrage in 1927 (the first in Argentine history), advanced labor laws, a progressive tax system, development of technical education, agrarian reform, state intervention to promote wine and olive industries, a road network to populate the territory, public parks, and housing plans for workers.

==== Principista Radicalism in Entre Ríos ====
Laurencena adopted an openly oppositional stance toward Hipólito Yrigoyen after his election as president in 1916, eventually breaking away from the Radical Civic Union to form the Principista Radical Civic Union or Radical Civic Union of Entre Ríos, which nominated him as a presidential candidate in 1922; he received a minimal number of votes (18,000 compared to the 450,000 obtained by Alvear). In 1924, the principista radicals joined the group of radical leaders who founded the Antipersonalist Radical Civic Union.

==== Verismo in Tucumán ====
In 1922, Octaviano Vera was elected governor of Tucumán Province. Vera, who had adopted the alpargata as a party symbol, sought to represent workers in the sugar industry and confront the powerful sugar mill owners who controlled the provincial economy.

The combination of a major strike in April that year and the promotion of advanced labor legislation (minimum wage and eight-hour workday) put employers on alert, leading the Argentine Sugar Center to reorganize to coordinate measures aimed at blocking Tucumán's "labor legislation". In November 1923, the province was intervened by the National Executive and Vera was removed from office.

The federal interventor Dr. Gondra was supported by industrialists, who lent him 2,000,000 pesos to pay the public administration, in advance of the 1924 harvest tax. Meanwhile, one of the radical factions, led by national deputy Antonio B. Toledo, asked the interventor to enforce the "labor laws" establishing the eight-hour day and a minimum wage of 4.20 pesos. But Gondra did not apply them because he was aligned with the industrial sector.

==== Tanquismo in Jujuy ====
Miguel Tanco was a radical leader who served as minister and later governor of Jujuy Province during the 1920s. Tanco promoted an advanced social and pro-indigenous policy aimed at subsidizing land purchases in the Puna and the Quebrada de Humahuaca to distribute them among Indigenous communities, along with infrastructure works, industrial development and workers' housing. A UCR leaflet described tanquismo policy as follows:

To the People of Jujuy!... Through this law the powerful, those who have amassed millions with the sweat and exhaustion of workers' lives, are obliged to give them bread and a humble roof... Today the children of the people must no longer drag chains! Let everyone attend en masse when the law is to be passed, to personally identify and not confuse the legislators who do not wish to approve it, who from that moment will be guilty of high treason against the interests of the humble. Long live the children of the people! Long live the liberated!

— Radical Civic Union, 1923

Tanquismo was resisted by conservative sectors of the UCR and the upper classes of Jujuy. In 1930, allied with Yrigoyen, Tanco was elected governor and expropriated a large amount of land in the Puna and Quebrada de Humahuaca, but within months he was overthrown by the coup d'état that removed the Yrigoyen government. In 1946, Tanco was elected senator under Peronism.

=== Antipersonalist Radical Civic Union ===
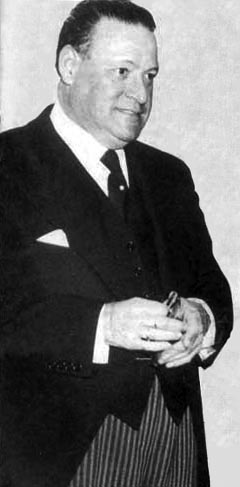
The antipersonalist radical Roberto M. Ortiz would become president in 1938.

Internal opposition sectors quickly aligned behind Alvear, forming a differentiated faction known as the Antipersonalist Radical Civic Union. At first, there was no formal split, because antipersonalists apparently intended to displace Yrigoyen's supporters from all their positions, including within the party. They achieved several provincial governments and occupied almost all ministries; their main opponent was Vice President Elpidio González, openly pro-Yrigoyen. According to Félix Luna in his book Yrigoyen, Alvear had not encouraged the creation of the antipersonalist faction, but his distancing from the leader was enough for the most conservative sectors of radicalism to turn against the "personalists".

But the division of the UCR became inevitable in 1923: nine radical senators declared themselves "antipersonalists", opposing the "personalism" of Hipólito Yrigoyen, and supported President Marcelo Torcuato de Alvear. There were also tensions between Alvear and Vice President Elpidio González. The division effectively began when senators started to harass the vice president. Yrigoyenists regarded antipersonalists as conservatives, while antipersonalists claimed that Yrigoyen violated the rules of the political system. These disputes continued and, worse still, spread to the National Congress, where deputies loyal to Yrigoyen often obstructed executive initiatives, either through debate or by leaving the chamber to deny a quorum. In this context, President Alvear closed extraordinary sessions by decree, given the near paralysis of legislative activity.

Although Alvear supported antipersonalism, when that faction asked him to intervene in Buenos Aires Province to affect Yrigoyenist electoral chances, Alvear refused, seriously damaging the antipersonalist movement. His response to his antipersonalist allies was very illustrative of his political stance:

Don't bother me! Sort it out yourselves and win if you can!

=== Return of Yrigoyenism ===
In 1927, the Antipersonalist Radical Civic Union chose Leopoldo Melo as its presidential candidate, accompanied by Vicente Gallo for vice president; the ticket was immediately supported by the Confederation of the Right, which unified the entire conservative spectrum.

At the beginning of 1928, Yrigoyenism won in Tucumán, Santa Fe and, above all, the governorship of Córdoba, until then in the hands of the Democrats (Confederation of the Right). Yrigoyen's return to power began to appear as a landslide. The Yrigoyenist campaign included Ignacio Corsini, a famous tango singer, who sang Enrique P. Maroni's tango "Yrigoyen Presidente" throughout the country.

== Yrigoyen's return to power (1928–1930) ==
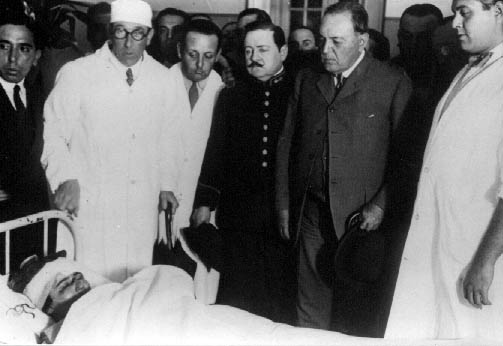
Hipólito Yrigoyen visiting a policeman wounded in a confrontation, in 1928.

=== Overview ===
Yrigoyen was re-elected in 1928. Historian Félix Luna said of that moment:

The breakdown of the liberating impetus of the radical government was fundamentally due to the breakdown of radicalism itself.

Yrigoyen was toppled by a military coup in 1930. Enrique Martínez was for one day acting President of Argentina.

=== Economic policy ===
On 29 October 1929, the Great Depression began when the Wall Street stock market crashed, dramatically affecting the entire world. In Europe and the United States, banks failed en masse; although this did not occur in Argentina, there were numerous factory and shop closures. As a consequence of the crisis, unemployment inevitably increased, while sales and real-estate income fell. A violent imbalance developed in the balance of trade, since the agricultural products exported to generate foreign exchange for Argentina's imports became dangerously unstable. Protectionist measures in the United States and Europe blocked Argentine exports to encourage local production, while the withdrawal of gold from Argentina made the crisis a complicated situation.

Radicalism, led by Hipólito Yrigoyen, did not know how to respond to the effects of the crisis. Several advances were made in communications: some radio stations began broadcasting in the country, three in Buenos Aires and Radio Capitol in Córdoba. In 1929, a ferry to transport cars between Santa Fe and Paraná was inaugurated, airmail with the United States was consolidated, and the Aeroposta company added Comodoro Rivadavia among its destinations. As a result of the global crisis, the closure of the Conversion Office was decreed.

Law 11,170 on agricultural exploitation was successfully enacted in January 1930 after a long debate. It modified tenancy rules by making a written contract and its duration mandatory. The Ministry of Public Health and the Institute of Nutrition were created, and scientific research was subsidized to strengthen public health. The Institute of Pedagogy was created for teacher improvement.

One of the last agreements managed by the government was a barter agreement with England, consisting of a commitment by both parties to open a credit of 100,000,000, with the idea that Argentina would buy railway material from England for the state railways, while England would acquire cereals and other products. The initiative was approved in the Chamber of Deputies but did not obtain Senate approval, despite the presidential message of January 1930.

=== Interventions ===
Yrigoyen intervened in the provinces of Mendoza and San Juan, governed by opponents: lencinismo in the former and the bloquismo of the Cantoni brothers in the latter. On 10 November 1929, opposition senator from Mendoza Carlos Washington Lencinas was assassinated by a Yrigoyenist group. The crime shocked the country and, logically, Yrigoyen was accused of having ordered it, although there is no evidence that this occurred. Carlos Lencinas was openly opposed to Yrigoyen, who had intervened in Mendoza, and had just been excluded from the Senate by the Yrigoyenist majority. One month later, on 24 December, an anarchist attack against Yrigoyen occurred as he left his home to go to the Casa Rosada. The attacker was an Italian anarchist named Gualterio Marinelli, who fired three shots at the car carrying the president without hitting the target; he was killed by the presidential guard when they repelled the attack. Soon the new Yrigoyen administration was viewed negatively by public opinion, since only a short time earlier he had walked the streets without a guard, while now his guards had killed a person.

The year 1930 began with the assassination of an opponent in a province under federal intervention: the bloquist lawyer Manuel Ignacio Castellano. On 2 March, parliamentary elections were held, in which the Radical Civic Union suffered a major defeat in the City of Buenos Aires: against the 100,000 votes obtained by the Independent Socialist Party, followed by the original Socialist Party with 84,000, the radicals obtained only 83,000 votes. Nationwide, the UCR's electoral support declined, obtaining 655,000 votes, while the opposition reached 695,000. That year, Yrigoyen signed the pardon of the anarchist Simón Radowitzky, something he had promised during his first presidency. However, the government deported him to Uruguay.

=== Energy policy ===
Hipólito Yrigoyen attempted to implement a policy in which oil management would be in the hands of the Nation. But this was poorly received by the feudal oligarchies that still governed some provinces, as well as by foreign interests that even reached the Senate; these factors prevented the passage of the oil nationalization law. On 1 August 1929, the state oil company Yacimientos Petrolíferos Fiscales, under the management of Enrique Mosconi, decided to intervene in the oil market to set prices and break the trusts, lowering official gasoline prices; the measure meant annual savings of twelve million pesos. These policies affected the interests of the U.S. company Standard Oil.

The coup d'état of 1930 cut short any possibility of nationalizing the resource. One of the motives for that conspiracy was the radical government's decision to nationalize hydrocarbons. Yrigoyen stated in his message to Congress:

The national mining laws, consistent with principles of civil law adopted by our code, were enacted at a time when the economic value and social importance that mineral oils or hydrocarbons, industrialized and placed on the market, would acquire in the future could not have been suspected. Hence, they did not introduce an exception within the legal regime adopted for natural substances existing underground, distributing their ownership between the Nation and the provinces in accordance with their political sovereignty, which means entrusting the management of the enormous interests of every kind related to oil to the multiple, changing and frequently contradictory administrative judgment of fourteen jurisdictions, in addition to federal jurisdiction (...) It is enough to state this state of affairs to verify its serious inconveniences and even its dangers, already shown in the hasty alignment of concessions by some provincial governments, whose ill-considered measures caused such justified concern and which, later revoked by the change of thought emerging from the renewal of local authorities, have left behind a trail of conflicts, currently submitted to the jurisdiction of the Supreme Court of Justice of the Nation.

— Yrigoyen's message to Congress, 1929.

Radicalism began the debate over oil nationalization in the Chamber of Deputies in 1927. There were conflicting opinions in the chamber: socialists supported mixed exploitation, while antipersonalist radicals and conservatives opposed the project. Finally, after three months, the Chamber approved the initiative in September 1928; however, the project became stalled in the Senate. When Yrigoyen began his second term in 1928, he included the measure among the matters to be discussed by the Senate during the extended sessions of 1929. On the initiative of Ricardo Rojas, the executive branch created the Petroleum Institute for specialization in the resource and its derivatives. In January 1930, the president complained to the Senate about the lack of consideration of the project, without positive results.

Since YPF could not satisfy domestic oil consumption, and given the danger of depending on U.S.-capital corporations that opposed nationalization of the resource, Yrigoyen decided in early 1930 to undertake negotiations with the oil company Luyamtorg, belonging to the Soviet Union. The treaty would provide 250,000 tons of crude oil in exchange for national products such as hides, quebracho extract, wool, sheep and casein. However, the agreement was once again not completed due to obstacles in the national legislature, and opponents branded Yrigoyen a Bolshevik.

=== Assassination of Senator Lencinas ===
Lencinas was a dissident radical who strongly opposed Hipólito Yrigoyen and had created in Mendoza a majority anti-Yrigoyenist radical current of antipersonalist orientation, known as lencinismo. The radical governments had adopted a policy of strong confrontation with lencinismo, intervening in the province whenever lencinismo won elections. In 1929, Lencinas was elected national senator for Mendoza, but the Senate, with the agreement of radicals and conservatives, rejected his credentials. The press criticized the decision and presented it as another example of Yrigoyen's authoritarianism.

Because rumors existed that the radical government was preparing his assassination, his inner circle recommended that he not return to Mendoza, which was under intervention by the Yrigoyenists, but Lencinas ignored the recommendation and declared that if anything happened to him it would be Yrigoyen's fault. Upon returning to Mendoza on 10 November 1929, he was shot dead.

The events occurred in the city of Mendoza, minutes after Lencinas returned from Buenos Aires, when he appeared on one of the balconies of the Mendoza Arms Club during the party welcome event. At one point someone shouted "Long live Yrigoyen!" and a shot was fired that struck Lencinas in the chest, killing him. Immediately afterward, police and lencinista supporters shot Juan Cáceres, who died of his wounds three days later. The judicial investigation established Juan Cáceres as the perpetrator.

The causes of the assassination were never clarified. At the time of the killing, Mendoza was under the intervention of the Yrigoyenist Carlos Borzani, accompanied by two young Yrigoyenist militants: Arturo Jauretche and Ricardo Balbín. Borzani, Jauretche and Balbín would all be identified by Yrigoyen's critics as intellectual authors of the crime, acting under Yrigoyen's orders.

=== International policy ===
At the end of 1929, recently elected U.S. president Herbert Hoover visited Argentina. During his stay, he emphasized the idea that the United States would refrain from intervening in the internal affairs of Latin America, arguing that such a policy was unpopular in his country, and that the United States would adopt a policy of "good neighborliness" toward the region. In Hoover's view, U.S. interventions had been carried out to protect citizens' rights, not for economic interests. His statements were received with skepticism by the Argentine press, although Hoover would dismantle some imperialist structures in several Caribbean countries. Relations with the northern power were not very fluid as a consequence of the radical government's neutralist policy. In addition, on one occasion Yrigoyen kept the Argentine ambassador to Washington in Buenos Aires and did not send the delegates appointed by Marcelo T. de Alvear to the Washington Conference of 1923 on conciliation and arbitration.

On the occasion of the inauguration of the telephone line between Argentina and the United States, Yrigoyen and Hoover had a telephone conversation in which the Argentine president stressed that both agreed on how international conflicts should be solved. A fragment of the conversation read:

But I must tell you, with my conviction increasingly accentuated, that the uniformity of human thought and feeling is not to be affirmed so much in the advances of the exact and positive sciences, but in the concepts that, like heavenly inspirations, must constitute the reality of life: since when we believed that humanity was completely secured under its own moral guarantees, we were surprised by such a hecatomb that nothing and no one could recount it in all its magnitude.

== See also ==
- History of Argentina
- Generation of '80
- Infamous Decade
- 1924 Napalpí massacre
