= Severino Di Giovanni =

Italian anarchist (1901–1931)

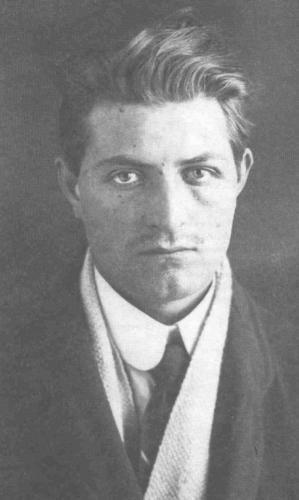
- Born: 17 March 1901; Chieti, Kingdom of Italy
- Died: 1 February 1931 (aged 29); Buenos Aires, Argentina
- Cause of death: Execution by firing squad
- Movement: Anarchism

Severino Di Giovanni (17 March 1901 – 1 February 1931) was an Italian anarchist, typographer, and journalist who immigrated to Argentina, where he became a prominent figure of expropriative anarchism during the 1920s. He settled in Buenos Aires where he founded the periodical Culmine and organized numerous protests and bombings agitations in support of Sacco and Vanzetti and against antifascism.

== Italy ==
Di Giovanni was born on 17 March 1901, in Chieti, Abruzzo. Raised right after World War I in a period of deprivations, such as hunger and poverty, his upbringing had a huge impact on his politics. He attended courses to become a teacher, and soon started teaching, before graduating, in a school in his town. He was self taught in the art of typography and read, in his free time, Mikhail Bakunin, Malatesta, Proudhon, and Élisée Reclus.

== Arrival in Argentina ==
Di Giovanni arrived in Buenos Aires with the last big wave of Italian immigrants before World War II. He lived in Morón and travelled daily to Buenos Aires Capital to participate in meetings and plan actions against fascism and Italian fascist supporters in Argentina.

An anarchist, Di Giovanni had nothing but contempt for the party in power, the UCR, which he saw as a pale reflection of more right-wing and fascist elements in Argentine politics. Severino Di Giovanni's first direct action took place on 6 June 1925, during the celebration of the 25th anniversary of Victor Emmanuel III's accession to the Italian throne, which took place at the Teatro Colón. President Alvear, his wife, opera singer Regina Pacini, and Count Luigi Aldrovandi Marescotti, ambassador of Fascist Italy, were present at the act, as well as numerous Blackshirts put in place by Marescotti to prevent any disorder. When the orchestra started the Italian hymn, Giovanni and his companions threw leaflets around, at the cries of "Assassins! thieves!" The Blackshirts managed to overcome them, and hand them over to the police.

== Culmine, Sacco and Vanzetti, and Propaganda of the Deed ==
After being quickly released, Di Giovanni took part in international protests against the arrest and trial of Sacco and Vanzetti, members of the Galleanist anarchist group, who were accused of a robbery and murder of two payroll guards. At the time, Di Giovanni was one of the most active anarchists in Argentina defending the two Italian immigrants, writing in various newspapers, including his own, founded in August 1925 and titled Culmine, and in the New York publication L' Adunata dei refrattari. Culmine advocated direct action and propaganda of the deed. Di Giovanni worked at it at nighttime, supporting his activism and family by working in factories and as a typesetter. He summarized Culmine's objectives:

- To spread anarchist ideals among Italian workers;
- To fight the propaganda of pseudo-revolutionary political parties, which use fake anti-fascism as a tool for winning political elections;
- To start anarchist agitation among Italian workers and keep anti-fascism alive;
- To interest Italian workers in Argentina in protest and expropriation;
- To establish an intense and active collaboration between anarchist groups, isolated partners and the regional anarchist movement.

On 16 May 1926, several hours after Sacco and Vanzetti's death sentence was announced, Di Giovanni bombed the U.S. embassy in Buenos Aires, destroying the front of the building. The following day, President Alvear ordered several police searches of those suspected in the attack, and the police requested assistance from the Italian embassy to identify suspects. The embassy immediately named Giovanni, who had disturbed the celebrations of the Teatro Colón. He was soon arrested by the police and tortured for five days, but would not provide information. Di Giovanni was released for lack of evidence.

Meanwhile, in Massachusetts, the defense counsel for Sacco and Vanzetti managed to postpone their executions until 23 August 1927. A movement in support of the Galleanist anarchists continued to agitate for their pardon and release. On 21 July 1927, the U.S. embassy published an article in the conservative newspaper La Nación, which described the two Italian anarchists as common criminals. On the following day, Di Giovanni and two of his anarchist comrades, Alejandro and Paulino Scarfó, blew up a statue of George Washington in Palermo, Buenos Aires, and several hours later, exploded a bomb at the Ford Motor Company. Confronted with evidence of anarchist involvement in the bombings, on 15 August 1927, Eduardo Santiago, the Federal Police officer in charge of the investigation, claimed that everything was under control and that no anarchist in the world would defeat him. On the following day, Santiago barely escaped from the bombing of his house by Di Giovanni and his group, having gone to buy cigarettes a few minutes before.

On 23 August 1927, Sacco and Vanzetti were executed; in response, a 24-hour general strike was proclaimed in Buenos Aires, as well as many other capitals of the world. Several days after the executions, Di Giovanni received a letter from Sacco's widow, which thanked him for his work, and informed him that the director of the tobacco firm Combinados had proposed her a contract to produce a cigarette brand named "Sacco & Vanzetti". On 26 November 1927, Di Giovanni and his comrades duly bombed Bernardo Gurevich's tobacco shop Combinados on Rivadavia 2279. Di Giovanni and his comrades continued their anti-U.S. campaign of terror. The headquarters of Citibank and the Bank of Boston were severely damaged in a bombing on 24 December 1927, killing two people and injuring twenty-three others.

At the beginning of 1928, the Italian liberal newspaper from Buenos Aires, L'Italia del Popolo, denounced the Italian consul, Italo Capil, as an informer and supporter of fascist elements in the Federal Police. Upon being told that the consul would visit the new consulate, along with the new ambassador, Giovanni and the Scarfó brothers bombed the Italian consulate on 23 May 1928, killing nine people and injuring 34 others. At the time, the Italian consulate bombing was the deadliest bombing ever to take place in Argentina. Opponents of the Italian fascist government claimed derisively that the funerals of the consular employees were performed in accordance with the "fascist funeral rite", in the presence of the ambassador, the state delegate of Italian fascists in Argentina (Romualdo Matarelli), President Alvear (and his wife, Regina), and General Agustín P. Justo. On the same day, Di Giovanni attempted to bomb Benjamín Mastronardi's pharmacy, in La Boca. Mastronardi was the president of the Fascist Committee of La Boca. The bomb was deactivated by Mastronardi's son.

Giovanni's penchant for 'propaganda by the deed' triggered fierce debates inside the anarchist community; some anarchist leaders argued that Di Giovanni's actions were counterproductive, and could only result in a military coup and a victory for fascist forces. Anarchist journals such as La Antorcha and La Protesta criticized Di Giovanni's methods of direct action and indiscriminate violence. La Protesta, edited by a fierce opponent of Di Giovanni, the anarcho-syndicalist Diego Abad de Santillán, took an openly anti-Di Giovanni line, which hardened as the bombings got more indiscriminate. La Antorcha was more ambiguous in its criticism. Neither paper pleased Di Giovanni, and both were denounced by Culmine. The war of words escalated. On 25 October 1929, someone assassinated Emilio López Arango, an editor of La Protesta. At first a group of bakers who were members of the same union as Arango were suspected of the killing but were never charged with the crime. Di Giovanni and his group were reportedly the prime suspects in the assassination.

La Protesta immediately denounced the bombing of the Italian consulate. The criticism had no effect. Three days after the Italian consulate bombing, Di Giovanni struck again in Caballito, bombing the home of Cesare Afeltra, a member of Mussolini's secret police. Alfeltra was accused by Italian anarchist exiles of having practiced torture on members of various radical anarchist and anti-fascist groups in Italy. U.S. President-elect Herbert Hoover visited Argentina in December 1928. Di Giovanni wanted to bomb Hoover's train in revenge for the execution of Sacco and Vanzetti, but the bomber, Alejandro Scarfó, was detained shortly before installing the explosives on the rails.

This debacle led Di Giovanni to suspend his bombing campaign; he focused instead on his journal Culmine. In 1929, he wrote:

Spending monotonous hours among the common people, the resigned ones, the collaborators, the conformists – isn't living; it's a vegetative existence, simply the transport, in ambulatory form, of a mass of flesh and bones. Life needs the exquisite and sublime experience of rebellion in action as well as thought.

Following the September 1930 military coup, which overthrew Hipólito Yrigoyen, replaced by General José Félix Uriburu and Agustín P. Justo, Giovanni made plans to free his comrade Alejandro Scarfó from prison. Needing funds to bribe the prison guards, he assaulted Obras Sanitarias de la Nación on 2 October 1930, achieving the most important robbery until then in Argentina, taking with him 286,000 pesos. However, the planned breakout never occurred, and Scarfó remained in prison.

== Capture and execution ==
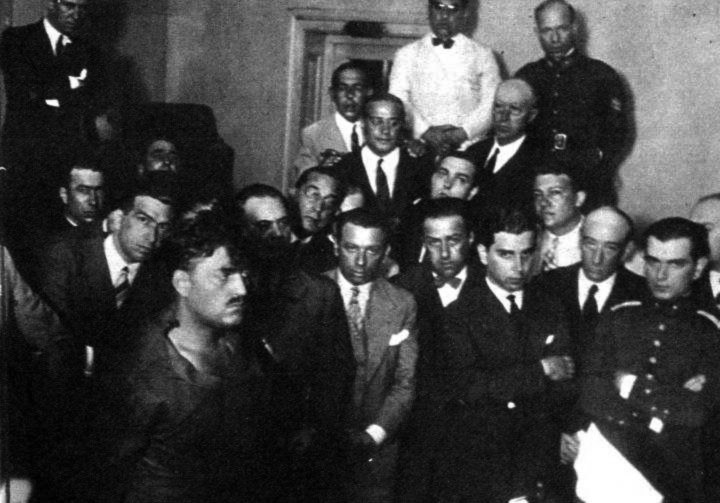
Di Giovanni in court

In 1928, Giovanni separated from his wife, Teresa Masciulli, largely due to the perils of his underground lifestyle and political persecution, though he continued to support her and their children. Around this time, he began a committed relationship with América Josefina ("Fina") Scarfó, the teenage sister of the Scarfó brothers, Alejandro and Paulino. To escape her strict parents and remain with Di Giovanni, Fina entered into a fake marriage with Silvio Astolfi. At the beginning of the Infamous Decade initiated by the military coup, Di Giovanni passed long periods of his time in seclusion, working on Elisée Reclus's complete works. The police attempted to arrest him at a printing shop, but Di Giovanni managed to escape during a gun battle in which one policeman was killed and another injured.

On 29 January 1931, Di Giovanni was arrested following a shootout and a suicide attempt. The following morning, the police raided their farm in Burzaco. América announced that the 300 chickens found in their house were to be given to the poor of Burzaco.

The military junta publicized the arrests as a victory of the new regime, and immediately organized a military tribunal. Di Giovanni was ably defended by his appointed defence counsel, Lieutenant Juan Carlos Franco, who spoke out in favour of the independence of the judicial system, and alleged that Di Giovanni had been tortured by the police. Franco's spirited defence of his client caused his own arrest after the trial; he was later dismissed from the ranks of the armed forces and briefly imprisoned before his deportation from Argentina. It was to no avail; the evidence against Di Giovanni was overwhelming. Both he and Paulino Scarfó were sentenced to death; Fina, being underage, was freed.

Severino Di Giovanni was executed by firing squad on 1 February 1931; he was 29 years old. He shouted "Evviva l'Anarchia!" (Long live Anarchy!), before being hit by at least eight 7.65 mm Mauser rifle bullets. After exchanging a final farewell, Paulino Scarfó was also executed a few hours later. Di Giovanni's body was to be buried secretly, on orders of the Interior Minister Matías Sánchez Sorondo, in La Chacarita Cemetery. However, on the following day, his grave was anonymously decorated with flowers.

== Postscript ==
After Di Giovanni's execution, Fina abandoned her husband Silvio Astolfi, and eventually remarried, settling down to a quiet life in Buenos Aires. After serving a lengthy prison term, Astolfi returned to Europe and carried on with his antifascist activity: he was later killed during the civil war in Spain. On 28 July 1999, Fina Scarfó obtained the love letters which Di Giovanni had sent to her from prison decades earlier, but which had been seized by the police.

Fina died on 19 August 2006, at age 93. Teresa Masciulli, Di Giovanni's widow, remarried, and Di Giovanni's children changed their names. Alejandro Scarfó, after serving a term of imprisonment for the attempted assassination of President Hoover, was released from prison in 1935.

== See also ==
- Anarchism in Argentina
- History of Argentina (1916–1930)
- Insurrectionary anarchism

== Bibliography ==
- Revolutionary Unionism - The FORA In Argentina
- L'Adunata dei refrattari The Buenos Aires Tragedy: The Last Tango of Severino Di Giovanni & Paul Scarfo. London and Berkeley: Kate Sharpley Library, 2004
- Bayer, Osvaldo. Severino Di Giovanni, El idealista de la violencia. Buenos Aires: Galerna, 1970 (in Spanish)
- Noble, Cristina. Severino Di Giovanni, Pasión Anarquista. Buenos Aires: Ed. Capital Intellectual, 2006 (in Spanish)
