= La Forestal massacre =

1920 killing of workers in Santa Fe, Argentina

La Forestal massacre was the mass killing, torture, rape and burning of houses of workers aligned with the anarcho-syndicalist union FORA by private police forces and the paramilitary nationalist organization Argentine Patriotic League in January 1921 in several towns of the north of the Santa Fe province of Argentina. The number of victims of the massacre was about 600 people, striking workers (and their families) of the British tanning company La Forestal (The Forestal Land, Timber and Railways Company Limited).

== Background ==
Before the arrival of La Forestal, quebracho woods occupied the south of the Chaco province and the north of the Santa Fe province. In 1906, with very limited state regulation, La Forestal took control of more than 5 million acres of land, obtaining one of the largest tannin reserves in the world and started production operations. It founded about 40 towns, built 400 kilometers of railways, around 30 factories and its own ports. The extraction of tannin by the company caused environmental problems in the local habitat including floods due to deforestation and the extinction or endangerment of wildlife species.

The living and labor conditions of the workers were not good: 12-hour workdays and bad health conditions. Payments were made in vouchers which could only be used to buy food and other goods from the company's own stores. Trading of goods besides through the company stores was prohibited.

As a result of the poor working and living conditions, the workers organized through the anarchist and revolutionary socialist Federación Obrera Regional Argentina (FORA) to improve their working conditions. The company created a repressive body named Gendarmería Volante with the permission of the local authorities and in December 1920 closed some factories and fired workers.

== The events ==
On 29 January 1921, a workers revolt took place in which 300-400 workers tried to capture two factories. The company responded by sending the Gendarmería Volante which along with the paramilitary nationalist Argentine Patriotic League attacked the workers and their families killing about 600 of them. Besides the killings, many people were tortured and women raped and workers' houses were burned to the ground.

== See also ==
- Tragic Week (Argentina)
- Patagonia Rebelde
- Napalpí massacre
- Radical Civic Union
- History of Argentina (1916–1930)
