= World of Labor Institute =

The Instituto del Mundo del Trabajo (Spanish for World of Labor Institute) is an Argentine labor research institute, with offices in Buenos Aires, Mar del Plata and other cities. Its current chairman is Julio Godio.
