= Julio Godio =

Argentine sociologist

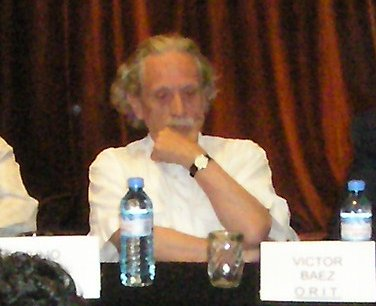
Godio at Summit of the Americas, Mar del Plata in 2005

Julio Godio (1939 – May 20, 2011) was an Argentine sociologist.

Born at La Plata, Buenos Aires Province, he was elected president of the students' union of the University of La Plata in 1958. Very much related with the labor movement (in Argentina and Latin America), Julio Godio was an official of ILO-ACTRAV, and worked actively with the Friedrich Ebert Seitung, ICFTU-ORIT, IMF, BWI, UNI, etc. He wrote important books and publications about the labor movement, among them: The Tragic Week, History of the Argentine Labor Movement (1878–2000), History of the Latin American Labor Movement, The MERCOSUR, The workers and the FTAA, etc.

He also served as Chairman of the World of Labor Institute.

== Publications ==
- La Semana Trágica (1973), ISBN 950-614-374-9
- Diálogo sindical Norte-Sur (1982)
- El movimiento obrero latinoamericano 1880-2000 (2 volúmenes) (1982).
- El movimiento obrero argentino 1880-1990 (5 volúmenes) (1991)
- Los sindicatos en las economías de mercado (1994).
- La conquista del poder: el sistema político argentino (1996).
- La incertidumbre del trabajo (1998).
- Sociología del trabajo y política (2001).
- Argentina: en la crisis está la solución (2002).
- Argentina: luces y sombras en el primer año de transición (2003).
- El MERCOSUR, los trabajadores y el ALCA (2004).
- El Tiempo de CFK (2008)
