= La Forestal =

The Forestal Land, Timber and Railways Company Limited
- Industry: Wood
- Founded: 1906
- Defunct: 1963; 62 years ago
- Fate: Defunct
- Headquarters: Chaco Santafesino (Santa Fe Province), Argentina
- Area served: Worldwide
- Products: Tannin
- Number of employees: 20,000
- Parent: Murrieta & Co., London

The Forestal Land, Timber and Railways Company Limited, commonly known as La Forestal, was a British forestry company that operated in the region between the southern Chaco and northern Santa Fe provinces in Argentina. During the late 19th and early 20th centuries, La Forestal exploited the extensive quebracho forests in these provinces, becoming the leading global producer of tannin. The company played a significant role in establishing approximately 40 towns, constructing ports, laying down 400 kilometers of private railways, and operating around 30 factories. At its peak, La Forestal employed about 20,000 people.

Throughout its presence in Argentina, La Forestal possessed 2,000,000 hectares of quebracho forests, owned five tannin plants and operated 400 kilometers of railways. The company functioned like a self-contained entity within the region, managing ports and towns. It even had its own security force, the Gendarmería Volante, established following the 1919 strikes and managed by Santa Fe Governor Enrique Mosca. Moreover, La Forestal introduced its own currency, which workers used to exchange for food and clothing.

La Forestal's exports were substantial, and its Chaco tannin played a crucial role in tanning leather goods, including boots and other gear, for British soldiers during World War I.

Between 1919 and 1923, workers' unions within the company engaged in labor struggles, culminating in the La Forestal massacre in 1921, one of the largest massacres in Argentine history. The company eventually departed Argentina in 1963, leading to the closure of the towns it had established. Unfortunately, this departure was preceded by the deforestation of almost 90% of the forests, causing significant ecological damage and desertification estimated at approximately 3 billion dollars.

== History ==
=== Origins ===
During the mid-19th century, the Chaco Santafesino region was largely undeveloped, characterized by wetlands and red quebracho forests. The area was inhabited by indigenous groups such as the Abipones and Mocovíes, who eventually faced displacement or elimination due to military campaigns. Additionally, there were some agricultural colonies and scattered farms in the region. Life in the area was marked by the typical circumstances and conflicts of border regions.

In 1872, the provincial government took action to develop the Chaco Santafesino by contracting a loan with the London firm "Murrieta & Co.," represented by the Argentine Lucas González. The loan, totaling GBP 180,187, was intended to serve as the initial capital for the establishment of the Banco Provincial de Santa Fe. However, the loan was not repaid on time, leading to lengthy negotiations. Eventually, in 1880, the National Government, under González's guidance, passed a bill to honor one-third of the debt with Treasury bonds and the remaining two-thirds with public land, which would be restricted and sold in England and other parts of Europe.

The law's implementation resulted in González being appointed as the agent for the London firm, tasked with selling 668 square leagues of land, approximately 2 million hectares, covered with quebracho trees, making it the largest tannin reserve in the world. Consequently, these lands were owned by English, German, and French interests, mainly represented by Murrieta & Co. The transaction faced little questioning in the National Parliament, and there were rumors that the lands might be subdivided into colonies, as the region was seen as suitable for the settlement of Anglo-Saxon settlers.

Over the years and after several business mergers, "The Forestal Land, Timber and Railways Company Limited," known as "La Forestal," was formally established in 1906.

=== Development and work conditions ===
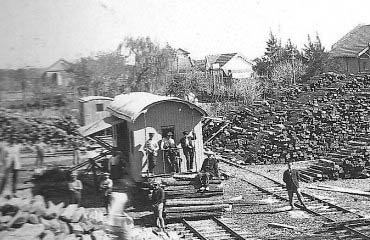
The company had its own railway lines to transport goods and workers

During the late 19th and mid-20th centuries, the tannic industry played a significant role in the economy of the Chaco region. Numerous tannin factories were established in the northern province of Santa Fe, attracting thousands of workers and giving rise to new urban centers known as "forest towns." Notable examples include Villa Guillermina, Tartagal, La Gallareta, and Villa Ana. The workers in the tannin industry faced challenging living conditions, particularly those employed in the forestry obrajes, where the work was demanding.

To address the labor shortage, La Forestal invested in infrastructure to attract and retain workers in the forest. As a result, factory towns emerged within the quebracho Colorado forests, housing workers associated with the industrial process. The workforce was divided, and hierarchical differences were prevalent between the workers and the company.

The main towns featured tannin factories, general stores, elegant English-style residences for married managers and employees, "bachelor" accommodations for single men, simple ranches for workers and laborers, sports clubs, golf courses, and amenities such as electricity, running water, sewer systems, and medical care. However, deep within the closed forest, workers and their families lived in modest taperas or enramadas.

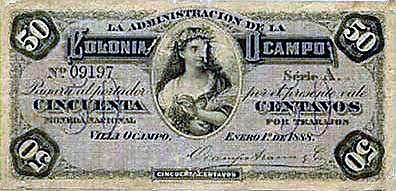
Banknote issued by La Forestal

Most loggers were internal migrants from provinces such as Corrientes and Santiago del Estero, often accompanied by their families. Payment was made using tokens, which workers exchanged for food and clothing available exclusively at La Forestal stores. The company enforced a monopoly on retail trade in the region.

The obrajes were temporary settlements, inhabited until the quebracho exploitation in a specific area was complete. Families were then relocated by rail to new, untouched areas, where they settled in rudimentary ranches. Most workers lived in harsh conditions, sleeping on the ground or in ditches for warmth.

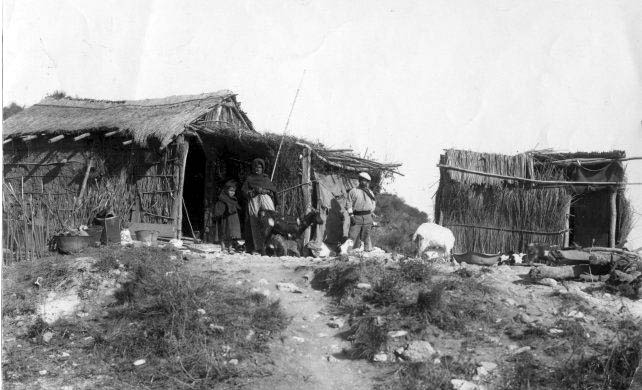
Workers of La Forestal lived in poor conditions

Women were crucial in supporting the exhausted workforce, serving as wives, mothers, teachers, nurses, prostitutes, midwives, healers, seamstresses, cooks, laundresses, ironers, and sellers at obrajes dances. Many women provided their services without remuneration.

La Forestal also established private railway lines spanning 140 kilometers from its territory to Argentine ports. As the only railway in the region, the company profited by charging other state or private companies for transporting their goods. This arrangement increased production costs in northern Argentina but also facilitated exports that would have otherwise been difficult to achieve.

=== Strikes and massacre ===
In 1919, during the presidency of UCR's Hipólito Yrigoyen (1916–1922), the workers at La Forestal successfully established a strong union organization and initiated a general strike. Their demands included wage increases, the cessation of dismissals, and an 8-hour workday. The strike was resolved after rail workers blocked train routes, and the company agreed to the wage increase.

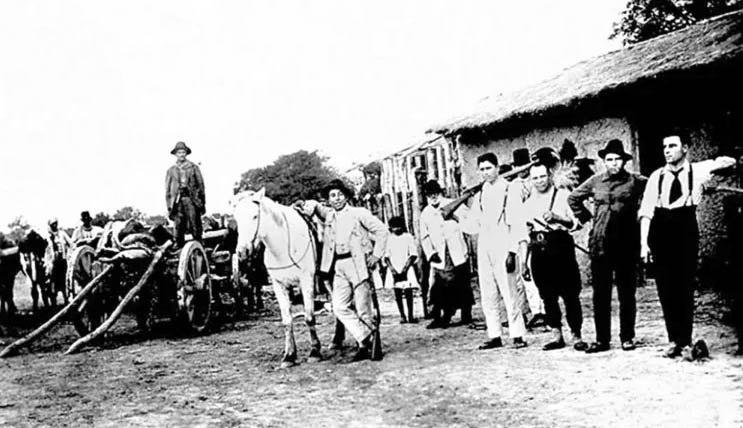
Gendarmería Volante, the parapolice group of La Forestal

However, in the following years, La Forestal breached the agreement and influenced the radical government of Santa Fe to create a paramilitary group called the Gendarmería Volante, funded by the company, to protect its interests. Simultaneously, the Argentine Patriotic League (Liga Patriótica Argentina), a civil organization, deployed armed groups in the area to confront strikers.

In December 1919, another strike began, lasting until mid-January 1920. It was marked by daily picketing to expand the influence of the Workers' Center in all workplaces. The company responded with a massive show of force, using prison guards, infantry soldiers, and police to confront the strikers. The rail and works railway workers obstructed train movements by removing railway signal needles. After a fierce struggle, the workers' resistance resulted in a new wage increase and the implementation of three 8-hour shifts.

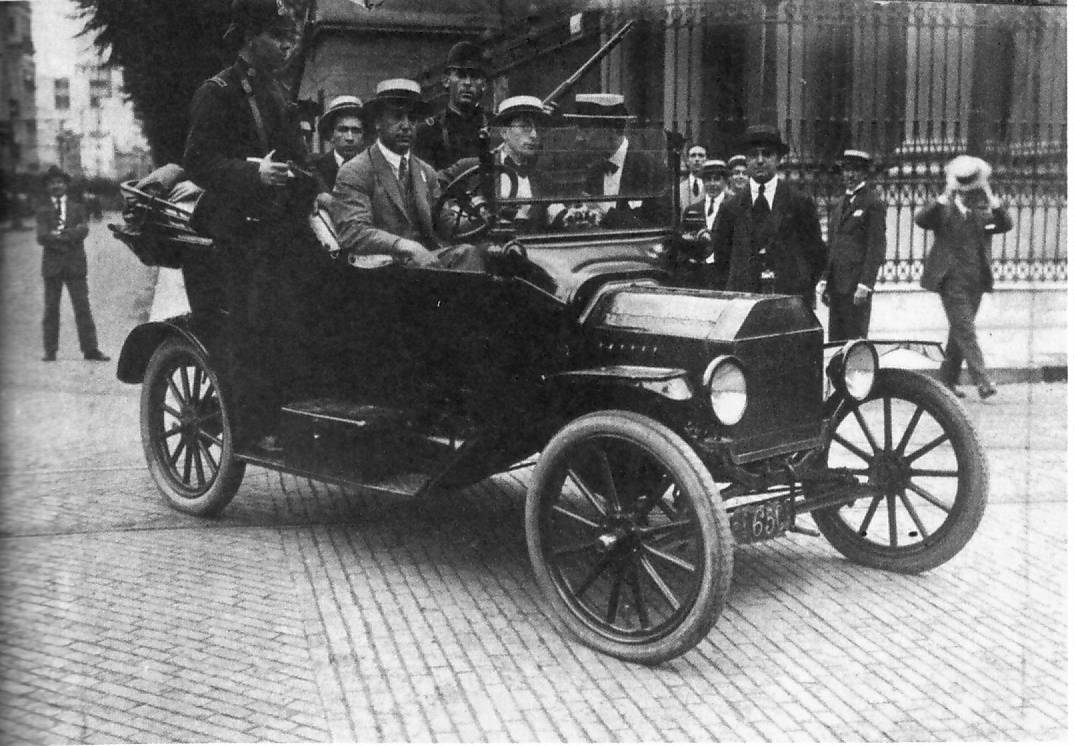
Armed members of the Patriotic League (photographed in Buenos Aires) were one of the armed groups that confronted strikers

Following these events, in December 1920, La Forestal initiated a prolonged lockout, closing its factories and laying off thousands of workers. This led to severe food shortages in several towns (such as Villa Guillermina, La Gallareta, Villa Ana, and Tartagal). The situation sparked a general social outbreak in the region on January 29, 1921, with armed clashes persisting for three months in towns and forests.

On that date, known as "the final workers' revolt," approximately 300 to 400 workers attempted to take over the Villa Ana and Villa Guillermina factories, engaging in a frontal fight against the Flying Gendarmerie. Despite arriving by train and armed, the workers were forced into the forest, where they faced a brutal crackdown by the authorities. The violent confrontation resulted in numerous deaths and injuries, with estimates of fatalities ranging from 500 to 600.

The rebellion faced brutal repression from the Gendarmería Volante and the Patriotic Legion, resulting in the deaths of approximately 600 workers and reports of torture, rape, and the burning of houses. By November 1922, La Forestal had reopened its factories, but by then, the Tanino Union and all traces of union organization among the quebracho workers had vanished.

Three decades later, with the quebrachales (quebracho forests) depleted, La Forestal permanently closed its plants in Argentina, causing the most significant social and ecological disaster ever generated by a company in Argentine history.

The rebellion of January 1921 marked the final episode in a series of open conflicts in northern Santa Fe that had begun in late 1918. During this period, workers in tannin factories, workshops, forests, trains, and boats organized themselves, formed unions, and presented a list of demands to improve working and living conditions. The workers sought respect from the hierarchies, united across various towns, and gained support from national labor federations. The struggle for improved conditions and rights culminated in the uprising of January 1921.

=== Demise ===
In 1963, La Forestal closed its last factory and ceased its operations in Argentina, marking the end of activity in the obrajes (forestry workstations). The company relocated its production to South Africa, where the Apartheid system allowed for fewer controls and cheaper labor. This move resulted in a trail of abandoned towns and displaced workers in Argentina.

Notably, La Forestal had previously operated in South Africa during the 1910s, where it took over two competing companies: the South African Extract Company Ltd. and the Natal Tanning Extract Company. Additionally, around 1920, amid the crucial workers' rebellion in Argentina, the company founded The Kenya Tanning Extract Company in Kenya and the Wattle Company in Zimbabwe (1945). As the company expanded its business in Africa and faced increasing costs in Argentina, it ultimately decided to end its operations in the country.

During its presence in Argentina, La Forestal significantly contributed to deforestation, cutting down almost 90% of the quebracho forests. The depletion of these forests had substantial ecological implications for the region.

== Aftermath – natural devastation ==
By 1940, La Forestal was consuming more than 1,300 tons of logs daily, equating to approximately 400,000 tons annually, and destroying 16,000 hectares of forest each year. The company consistently claimed that reforestation was not feasible and that previous experimental attempts had been unsuccessful.

In 2004, a joint report conducted by the Ministry of Environment and Sustainable Development of the Nation and the National Agricultural Technology Institute (INTA) extensively studied the devastation of natural forests and the process of desertification in the northern region of the province of Santa Fe, primarily attributed to the actions of La Forestal. As a consequence of the logging practices employed by La Forestal and other companies in Santa Fe, the province lost a staggering 82% of its forests.

Throughout the 80 years of La Forestal's operations, the company contributed only a minimal amount in taxes to the state. According to the company's financial records, in 1916, it paid the province a mere $0.3 million in taxes. A report prepared by the Ministry of the Environment and INTA estimated the ecological cost caused solely by La Forestal at a staggering $3 billion.

== Similar cases ==
In the Chaco province of Argentina, the city of Villa Ángela has a history of quebracho exploitation. "La Chaqueña," a tannin extractor, was founded in 1917 by Julio Martín and Carlos Grüneisen. Before this, around 1902, they had explored the national territory on horseback. The factory, which ceased operations in 1983, still features a 40-meter-high tower and well-preserved ruins. Recognized as Provincial Historical Heritage, La Chaqueña thrived during its heyday, employing 200 people in the plant and engaging over two thousand loggers who transported quebracho from the forests.

== See also ==
- Tragic Week (Argentina)
- Rebellion in Patagonia
