= Colonia Aborigen Chaco =

Coordinates: 26°57′25″S 60°12′10″W

- Municipality and village
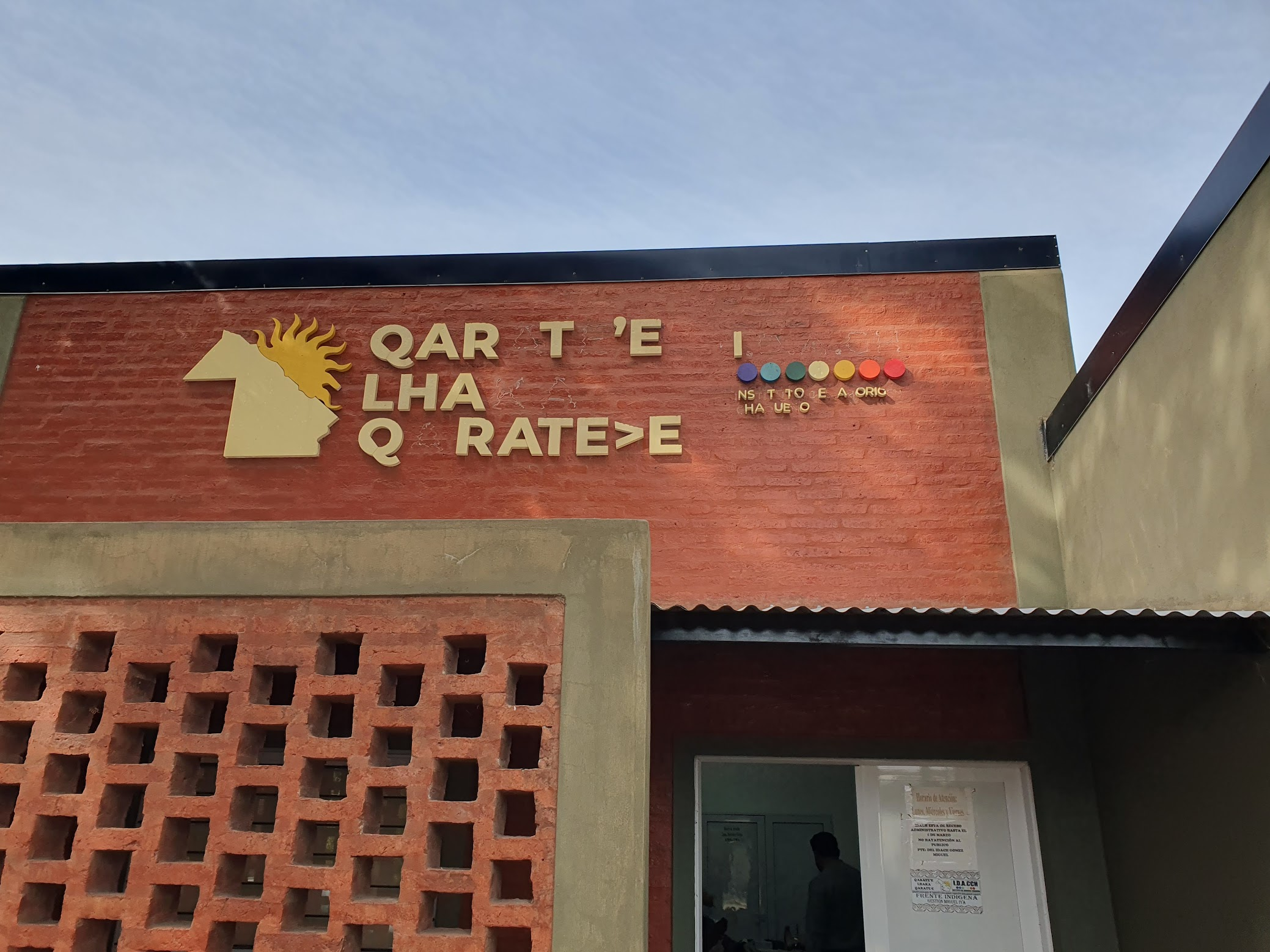
- Front of the new building of the institute of the aboriginal people of Chaco
- Interactive map of Colonia Aborigen Chaco
- Country: Argentina
- Province: Chaco Province
- Time zone: UTC−3 (ART)

Colonia Aborigen Chaco is a village and municipality in Chaco Province in northern Argentina.
