= Marcelo Torcuato de Alvear =

President of Argentina from 1922 to 1928

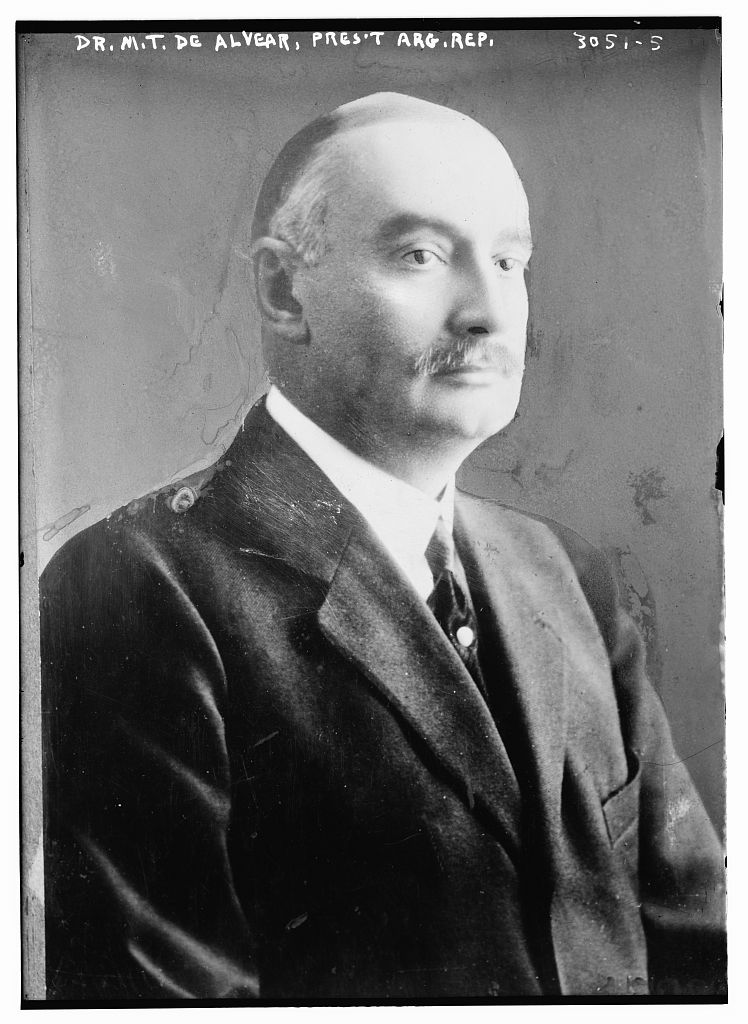
- Alvear c. 1915

20th President of Argentina
- In office 12 October 1922 – 12 October 1928
- Vice President: Elpidio González
- Preceded by: Hipólito Yrigoyen
- Succeeded by: Hipólito Yrigoyen

President of the Radical Civic Union National Committee
- In office December 1931 – 23 March 1942
- Preceded by: José María Martinez
- Succeeded by: Gabriel Oddone

Personal details
- Born: Máximo Marcelo Torcuato de Alvear Pacheco; 4 October 1868 Buenos Aires, Argentina
- Died: 23 March 1942 (aged 73) Don Torcuato, Buenos Aires, Argentina
- Resting place: La Recoleta Cemetery; Buenos Aires, Argentina
- Party: Radical Civic Union
- Spouse: Regina Pacini
- Education: University of Buenos Aires
- Profession: Lawyer

Military service
- Allegiance: Argentina
- Branch/service: Argentine Army
- Rank: Lieutenant colonel
- Marcelo Torcuato de Alvear's voice Marcelo Torcuato de Alvear in the province of Mendoza (recorded 1926)

Máximo Marcelo Torcuato de Alvear y Pacheco (4 October 1868 – 23 March 1942) served as president of Argentina from 1922 to 1928.

His period of government coincided precisely with the end of the postwar world crisis, which allowed him to improve the economy and finances of the country without major setbacks. He also stood out in the development of the automotive industry and the successful oil exploitation, with which he achieved an economic prosperity unknown until then for Argentina, and that was demonstrated with the great increase achieved in the GDP per inhabitant. In 1928, it had reached the sixth position among the highest in the world. In the labor and social sphere, this period was characterized by a process of urban concentration in the Litoral and Greater Buenos Aires, in addition to the establishment of half a million immigrants; there was an increase in the middle class, a rise in real wages, and a decrease in strikes and similar conflicts.

When he left the presidency he settled in France. He returned to the country a few years later to reunify his party and try to become president for the second time in 1931, but his candidacy was prohibited by the military regime of José Félix Uriburu. Alvear, along with other radical coreligionists, was persecuted, imprisoned or had to go into exile on repeated occasions by the repressive regime of the infamous decade, for which he experienced the Martín García prison on the island.

On 23 March 1942 struck down by a heart attack, Marcelo Torcuato de Alvear died next to his wife Regina Pacini at their home in Don Torcuato.

== Biography ==
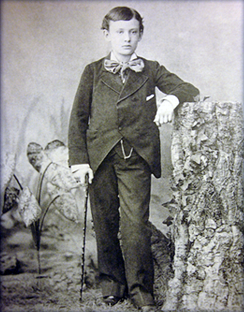
Alvear as a child

Máximo Marcelo Torcuato de Alvear was born on 4 October 1868 in the city of Buenos Aires. son of Torcuato de Alvear and Elvira Pacheco y Reinoso, descended from the wealthy Alvear family, a patrician family of Basque origin.

His great-grandfather Diego de Alvear y Ponce de León participated in the setting of boundaries with Brazil and became Brigadier General of the Royal Spanish Armada in 1770. His grandfather Carlos María de Alvear became supreme director of the United Provinces of the Río de la Plata and commander of the national Army in the war in Brazil. His father Torcuato de Alvear was mayor of the city of Buenos Aires.

Alvear's youth was typical of that of a young man of the aristocracy. He frequented the different circuits of the Buenos Aires night, which ranged from the respectable theaters in the centre of the city of Buenos Aires to meeting places of dubious reputation.

He entered the Colegio Nacional de Buenos Aires in 1879. His studies were very irregular: he finished second and third years only in 1881; two years later, the fourth and fifth, concluding his studies in 1885; however, he had finished high school at the National School of Rosario. In February 1886, he asked Dr. Manuel Obarrio, dean of the Law School of the University of Buenos Aires, to enroll him as a regular student to study Law. In that same year he failed in Introduction to Law, but approved Public International Law. He was taking subjects regularly, without delays and with high marks, especially in the courses on civil law. Finally in 1891, just a year after the death of his father, he obtained his law degree.

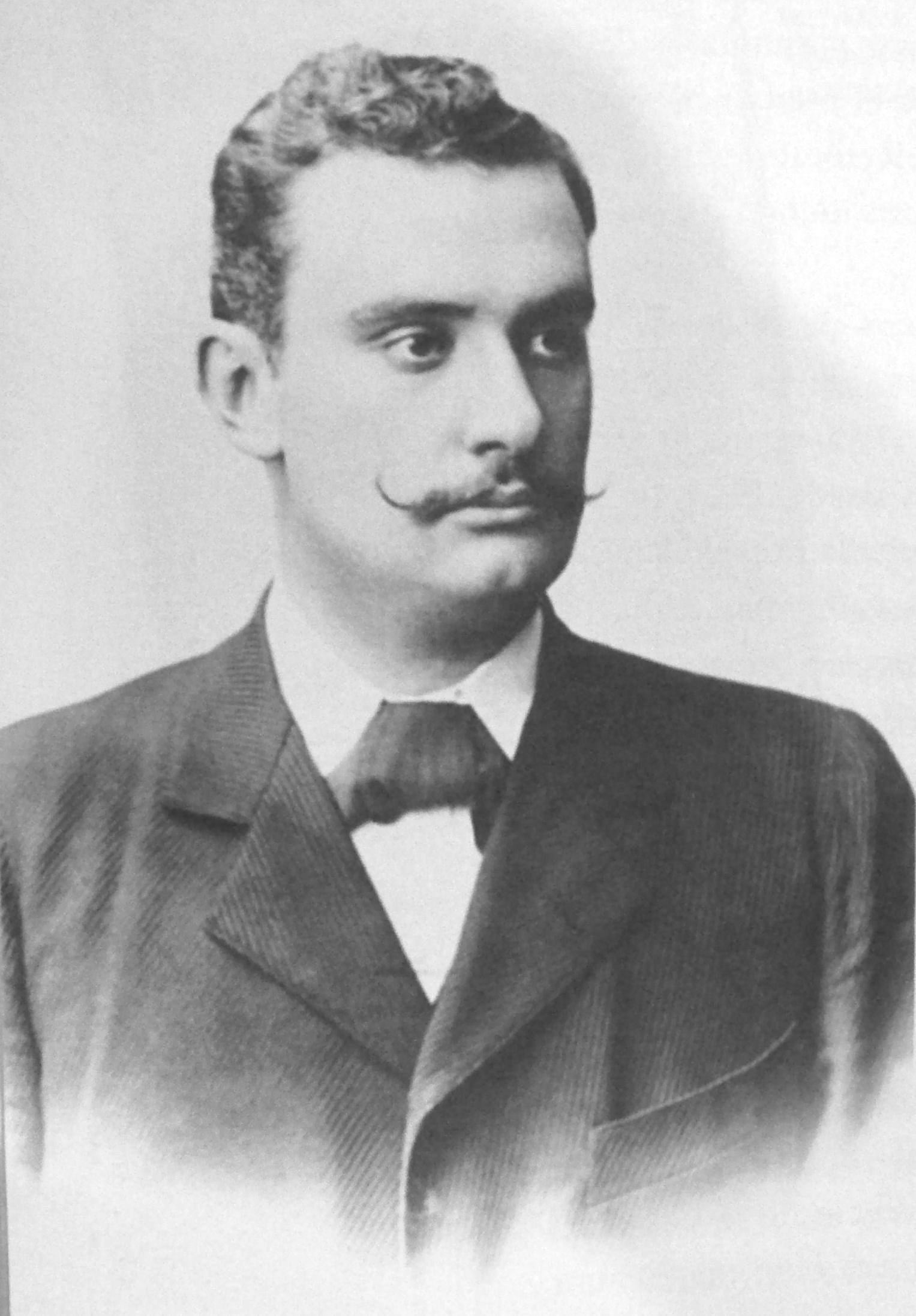
Alvear in 1893

The young Alvear, along with his fellow students and friends José Luis Cantilo, Fernando Saguier and Tomás Le Breton, formed a group with a certain reputation as public troublemakers. Some of those altercations even ended with some of the gang members in jail.

A man of fortune, he traveled widely in Europe and in 1906 he married the lyrical artist Regina Paccini in Lisbon; but his estrangement did not prevent him from following closely the events of the country and maintaining his interest in the efforts of radicalism in favor of the purity of suffrage and free vote.

=== Political career ===
Alvear had an outstanding performance by successfully organizing the meeting in the Florida Garden on 1 September 1889, a meeting that helped popularize Leandro N. Alem among the youth of Buenos Aires, who had been retired from political life since the 1880s. In this meeting the Revolution of the Park was also devised. Alvear was in charge of organizing the event, which was well attended. Immediately after the meeting at the Florida Garden, he began to work as Alem's secretary, and also accompanied him after the founding in 1890 of the Unión Cívica. In turn, he was a member and later president of the Socorro Club, member of the Directive Commission of the Civic Union and secretary of its National Committee. There are not many records of Alvear's performance in the Park Revolution, since he acted anonymously.

In the middle of the year 1891 the division of the Civic Union took place, between the supporters of Leandro N. Alem and those of Bartolomé Mitre; Alvear – whose father had been an autonomist – chose to stay on Alem's side, and was one of the signatories of the manifesto of 2 July of that year, the founding act of the Unión Cívica Radical. That same year, Alvear accompanied the radical caudillo on a tour of the interior of the country to launch the Bernardo de Irigoyen-Juan M. Garro formula.

During the afternoon of 30 July 1893, an emissary informed the young Alvear, who was in the box of the Lyric Theater, that in half an hour he had to leave to participate in the radical revolution. He withdrew at night and, with the help of Aurelio Bagú as a guide along with other young people, they took over the Temperley police station. Three days later, Hipólito Yrigoyen arrived with 1500 men, after revolting the entire centre of the province of Buenos Aires. Yrigoyen, along with four thousand men, entered the city, where they were applauded by its inhabitants. On 4 August the head of the rebellion created several battalions to defend his settlement at Temperley.

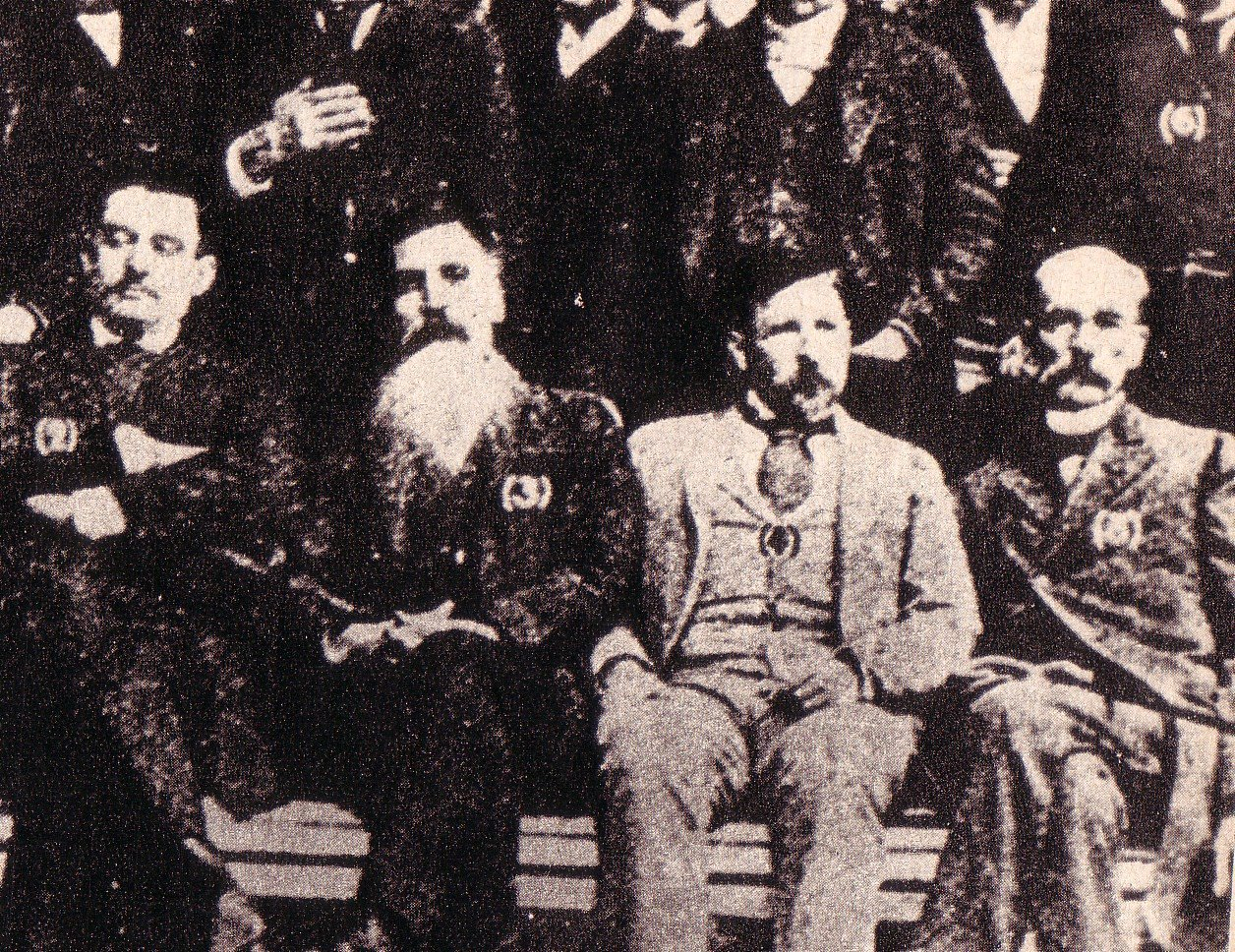
Alvear with Lenadro N. Alem, Francisco A. Barroetaveña and Juan Passe.

With the Sáenz Peña law of 1912, which established the secret and compulsory vote, the radicals abandoned the electoral abstention and Alvear was elected national deputy for the capital. Shortly afterwards he was taken to the presidency of the Jockey Club.

=== Regina and his years in France ===
In 1898, Alvear met the Portuguese soprano Regina Pacini, his future wife, when she was giving a season in Buenos Aires, at the General San Martín Municipal Theater. However, a first attempt to woo her was unsuccessful. Thus, Alvear left for Europe on the longest of the many trips he had made, determined to go after the Portuguese soprano, even going so far as to follow her throughout Europe, since the "persecution" would last eight years. At that time it was not well seen for an aristocrat to marry an artist.

They finally got married at seven in the morning on Saturday, 29 April 1907, in the Lisbon church of Nuestra Señora de la Encarnación. After getting married, Alvear lived in Paris for several years.

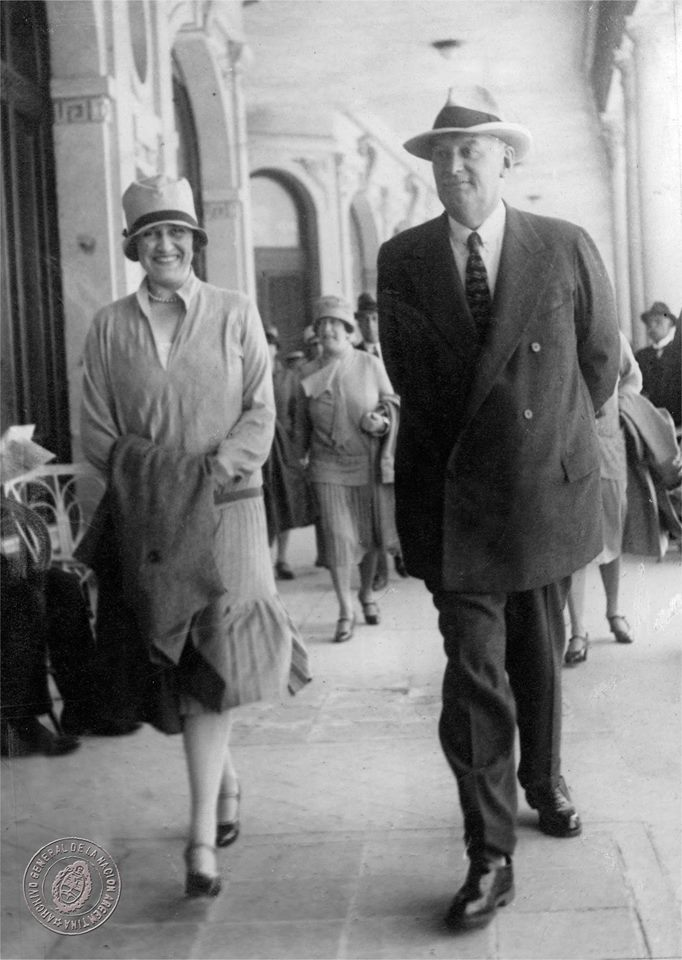
Alvear and Pacini in Mar del Plata.

=== Deputy and ambassador ===
When the Chamber of Deputies was renewed, he was elected deputy for the province of Buenos Aires; He was a hardworking parliamentarian and presented to Congress a bill related to civil servants of the State, which tended to base promotions in the hierarchical ladder by competition and antecedents.

During his period as a deputy he presented projects for the regulation of the civil code, debated on the organization of the army, He also supported, together with the deputies Carlos Saavedra Lamas, Julio Argentino Pascual Roca and Lisandro de la Torre, a law to create a body of Gendarmerie to protect the Argentine borders, although the project would not ultimately succeed.

In 1916 the new president, Hipolito Yrigoyen, privately proposed the post of Minister of War, but Alvear rejected it. He then offered to be ambassador to France, a position he accepted and held until 1922. During the five years that the First World War lasted, Alvear carried out missions to help the allies in Paris, donating together with his wife Regina Pacini a war hospital and a blood bank, where Pacini was in charge of caring for the wounded. The funds for this were obtained thanks to the contacts that Alvear had. For example, when the French military officer Joseph Joffre suggested to the Argentine ambassador to install an Argentine pavilion in the university city of Paris, Alvear was able to pay for the work thanks to the contributions of Otto Bemberg. He also assisted in the negotiations for the sale of crops to the allies during the Great War. Here the first differences between Alvear and Yrigoyen appeared: when the latter argued that Argentina should maintain a neutral position, Alvear was in favor of the country declaring itself to the side of the Triple Entente.

== 1922 election ==
After the first radical government of Hipólito Yrigoyen, the problem of presidential succession arose. Faced with disputes within the party, in March 1922 the National Convention of the UCR, despite the episode of the commission in Geneva that aired the fact of ideological differences, Yrigoyen decided to support Alvear, at that time ambassador to France, and a member of the most conservative faction of the UCR, of patrician and landowning social origin, and with few ties to the popular base of the party.

The National Convention elected him a candidate in March 1922 by 139 votes to 33 (which brought together various candidates). The Alvear-González formula triumphed over the Piñero-Núñez binomial in the elections of 2 April 1922, imposing itself in all districts except for Corrientes, Salta and San Juan.

Alvear acceded to the presidency winning with 47.5% of the votes, or 419,172 votes. On 12 June, 235 radical voters out of 88 opponents consecrated Alvear, who still resided in France, as the Nation's president.

The European governments saw with satisfaction the election of the new Argentine president, widely associated with the representative men of Western politics.

== Presidency ==
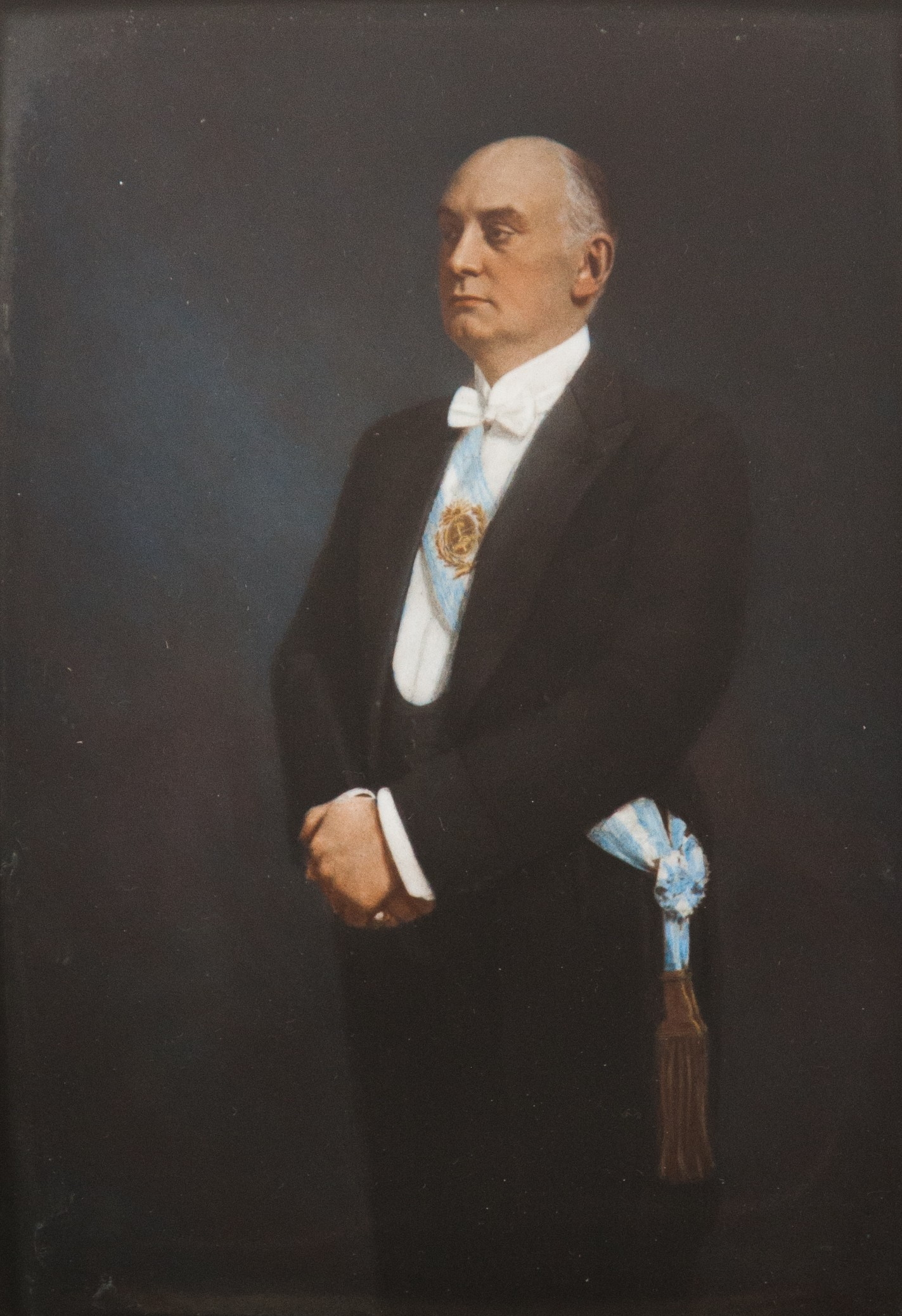
Alvear's official portrait, 1922.

Marcelo Torcuato de Alvear assumed the presidency of Argentina on 12 October 1922, but his cabinet caused a bad impression among many radicals, since almost none of the ministers was in favor of the former president, although it was, in most cases, of personalities of recognized intellectual capacity. For this reason, the distance between Alvear and Yrigoyen began. Certain appointments of ministers were surprising, as was the case of Admiral Manuel Domecq García, fervent repressor of the striking demonstrations during the Yrigoyen government, as well as the appointment of General Agustín Justo.

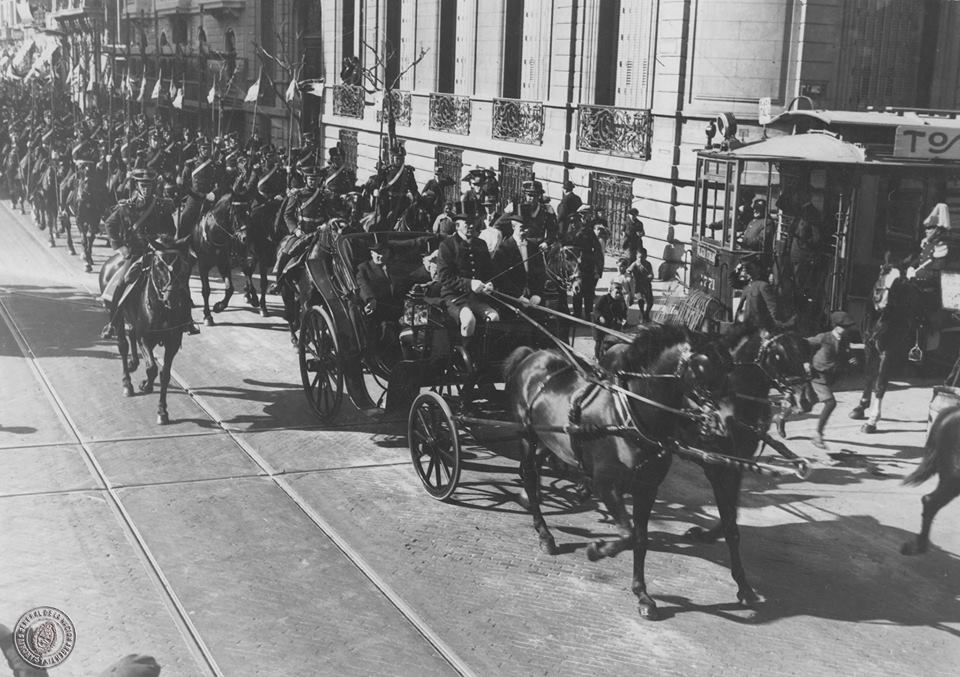
Alvear addressing Congress to be sworn in as president.

The Argentine radio broadcast the ceremony of the transfer of command, and for the first time in the history of Argentina the voice of a president was heard on the radio. The Sunday following the inauguration, Alvear visited the Jockey Club. It had been six years since a president had not attended there, as Yrigoyen refused to do so. Alvear's cabinet fully attended an interpellation in the Chamber of Deputies, when the ministers had not attended at least since 1919. On 1 May 1923 Alvear read the presidential speech. At 8:00 p.m., Alvear took his car and drove to the Constitución neighborhood to Yrigoyen's house, who invited him to dinner.

=== Economic policy ===
The economic expansion that Argentina experienced during the period known as the radical republic (1916–1930), had an average annual expansion of 8.1%.His period of government began just when the postwar world crisis ended, which allowed the economy and finances to improve without major setbacks.

During his government, the Argentine economy reached the most prosperous situation it has ever had in its history: GDP per inhabitant for 1928 reached sixth place among the highest in the world, and income increased by almost 100,000,000 gold pesos. Furthermore, for three years the commercial exchange had been positive. These conditions occurred mainly thanks to the favorable external front: the reactivation after the First World War caused European countries to buy Argentine crops. For this reason, the Alvear government focused on agro-export policies, especially meat and cereals.

By 1925, Argentina covered 72% of world flax exports, 66% of corn, 50% of meat, 32% of oats, and 20% of wheat and flour. Industrial crops such as cotton also increased exponentially, from 2,000 hectares in 1914 to 122,000 in 1930. In addition, the area planted with yerba mate, peanuts, rice, grapes, sugar cane and tobacco grew.

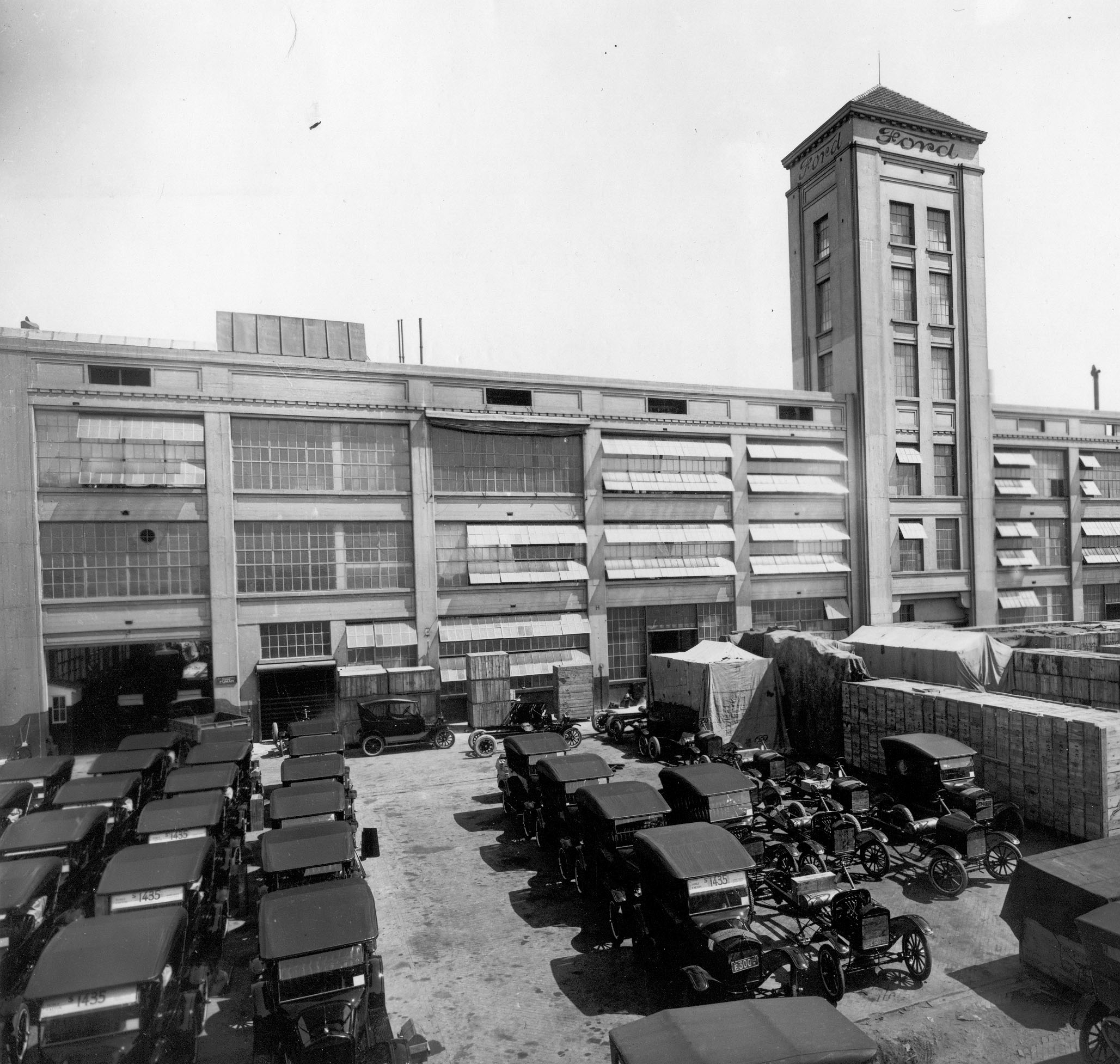
The Ford Motor assembly plant in La Boca, Buenos Aires.

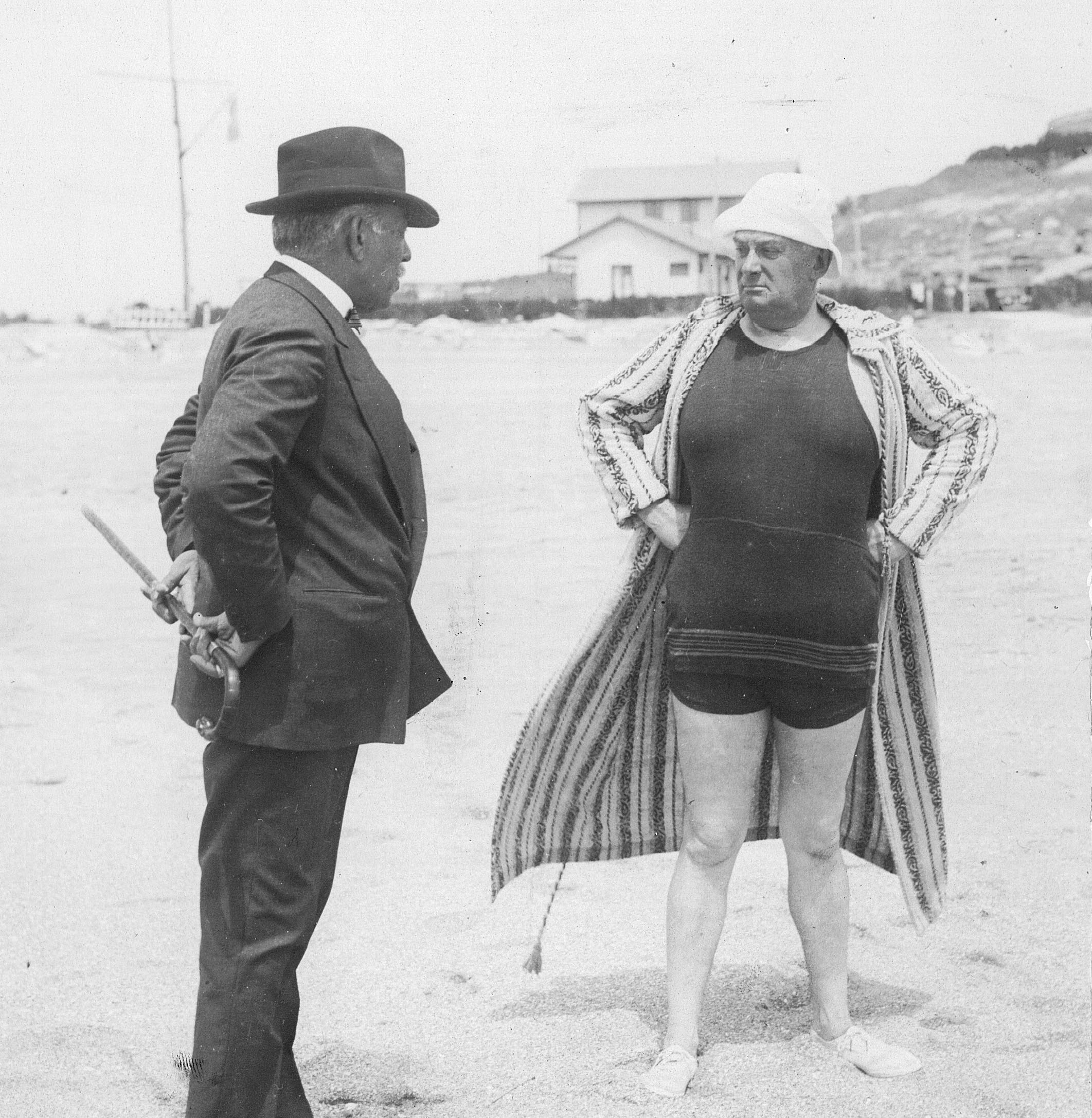
Alvear with Justo in Mar del Plata.

In addition to the growth in agriculture, industrial development also spread – albeit to a lesser extent – installing in 1922 the first Ford automotive production plant in Latin America, with an investment of $240,000 for its construction. Just one year later, the state-owned YPF installed the first gasoline pump, on the corner of Bartolomé Mitre and Rosales, in the city of Buenos Aires. In 1925 the popular Ford T went on sale; after two years, production reached 100,000 units.

Starting in 1925, there was a huge increase in foreign investments from the United States, carried out through companies related to the refrigeration industry, with energy distribution and production organizations, and consumer goods. This sudden "invasion" of US capital created competition with capital from the UK. That rivalry was reflected in areas such as transportation, as the automotive products exported from the United States competed with the British railways. But competition with refrigeration companies linked to these two countries also intensified. These conflicts led to the deterioration of relations with the British.

=== Social policy ===
A number of reforms were carried out during Alvear's presidency, amongst which included the creation of a Children's Bureau, a law that ended night work for bakers, a law intended to protect women and children factory workers, legislation forcing the payment of salaries in money and not goods, and a pension plan for bank employees. A decree of December 1922 set up an arbitration tribunal for railway questions. Law No. 11,357, which was signed by the President on 22 September 1926, granted to women “(single, divorced or widowed) of legal age all the civil rights and functions which the law grants to men who have attained their majority". An Act of August 1925 compelled (as noted by one authority) “the payment of wages in the national currency.” In 1926, the government started to take cognizance of agricultural cooperatives, with the Banco di la nacion legally empowered that year "to grant financial assistance, arrange amortization of loans, and otherwise aid in the formation of cooperative societies". Law No. 11388 was also passed by the government, "which officially recognized the cooperative movement and set forth regulations to guide the formation and operation of agricultural cooperatives". A decree was also signed approving regulations for mortgage loans by the Board of Directors of the Bank Employees' National Pension Fund. According to these regulations, loans from the Bank Employees' National Pension Fund "may be made to bank employees who have served 10 years under the national retirement laws recognized by the banking institutions where they are employed".

=== International policy ===
During Alvear's administration, border agreements were signed with Bolivia. An attempt was made to cancel the debt that Paraguay had with Argentina due to the War of the Triple Alliance. An attempt was also made to implement a tonnage limitation programme for warships alongside Chile.

On 30 October 1922, an act was signed between the Argentine ambassador Horacio Carrillo and the Bolivian chancellor Severo Fernández Alonso in which it was agreed to review the 1889 treaty to modify the border between both countries. In 1924, Román Paz assumed his position as the new Foreign Minister of Bolivia, for which reason the revision of the treaty had to be agreed upon between the Bolivian authority and Carrillo. Paz proposed that the city of Los Toldos remain in Bolivian rule.

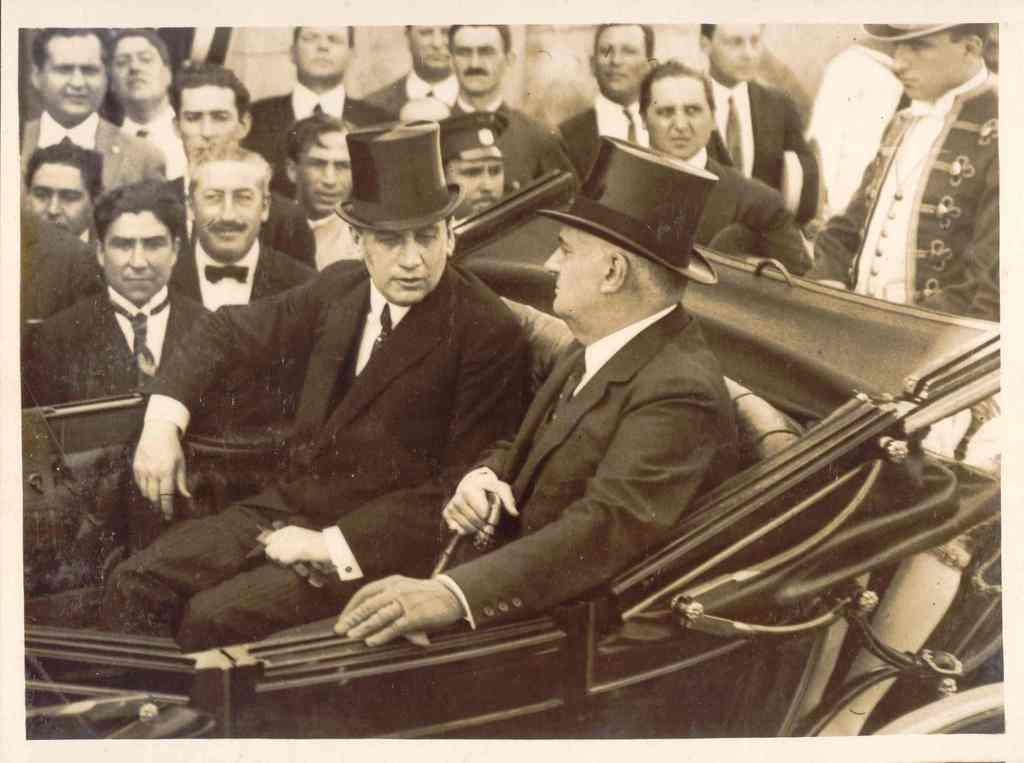
Together with the Chilean president, Arturo Alessandri, 1925.

This discussion lasted all of 1924, until an agreement could be reached with the new Bolivian foreign minister in office, Eduardo Díez de Medina, who did not intend major changes in the limit. The Bolivian president agreed to modify some boundary line in order to compensate Argentina and seal the agreement. The Carrillo-Díez de Medina treaty was signed on 9 July 1925 and ceded the town of Yacuiba to Bolivia.

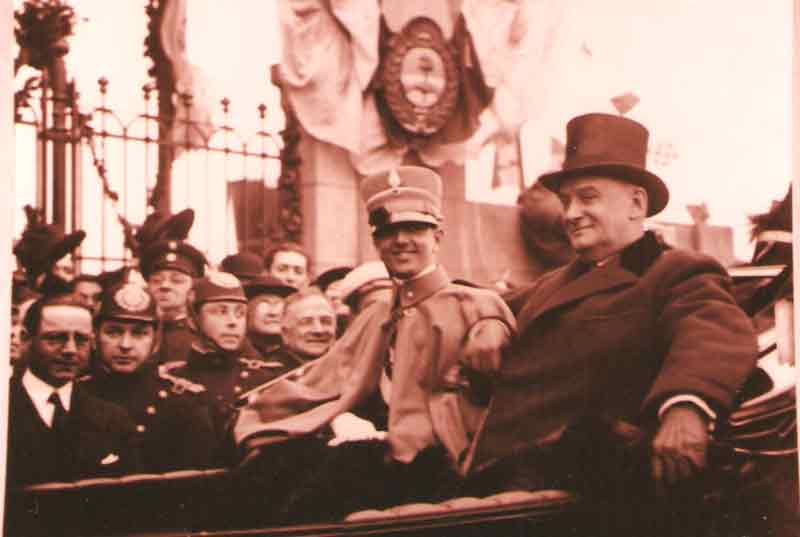
Humberto of Savoy, crown prince of Italy and the Argentine president, Marcelo T. de Alvear.

On 6 August 1924, celebrations and official entertainments were held on the occasion of the visit to the country of the crown prince to the throne of Italy, Umberto of Savoy. Alvear invited the future king to attend a parade of 25,000 children from Argentine public schools in the Congress Square.

The Government decided from 1922 to reject telephone and telegraphic postal correspondence to and from the Malvinas Islands in order to add concrete pressure to the diplomatic claim on the archipelago that was being occupied by the English. The government of the islands tried to alleviate the Argentine action by hiring steamers from Montevideo, and the British protest was not long in coming. Buenos Aires responded by alleging that the measure was not official, but that it was personal initiatives of the officials. In any case, by March 1928, communications with the islands were fully reestablished, after a clarification had been made that the resumption of service in no way implied renouncing the Argentine right to claim them.

During the V Pan American Conference meeting in Santiago de Chile in 1923, the host country proposed to Argentina to limit the arms race of both countries. The Chilean delegation accepted a first proposal from the United States of Brazil, which consisted of a limit of 80,000 tons for warships, but Argentina rejected it and responded with a counterproposal of 55,000 tons as a ceiling for warships.

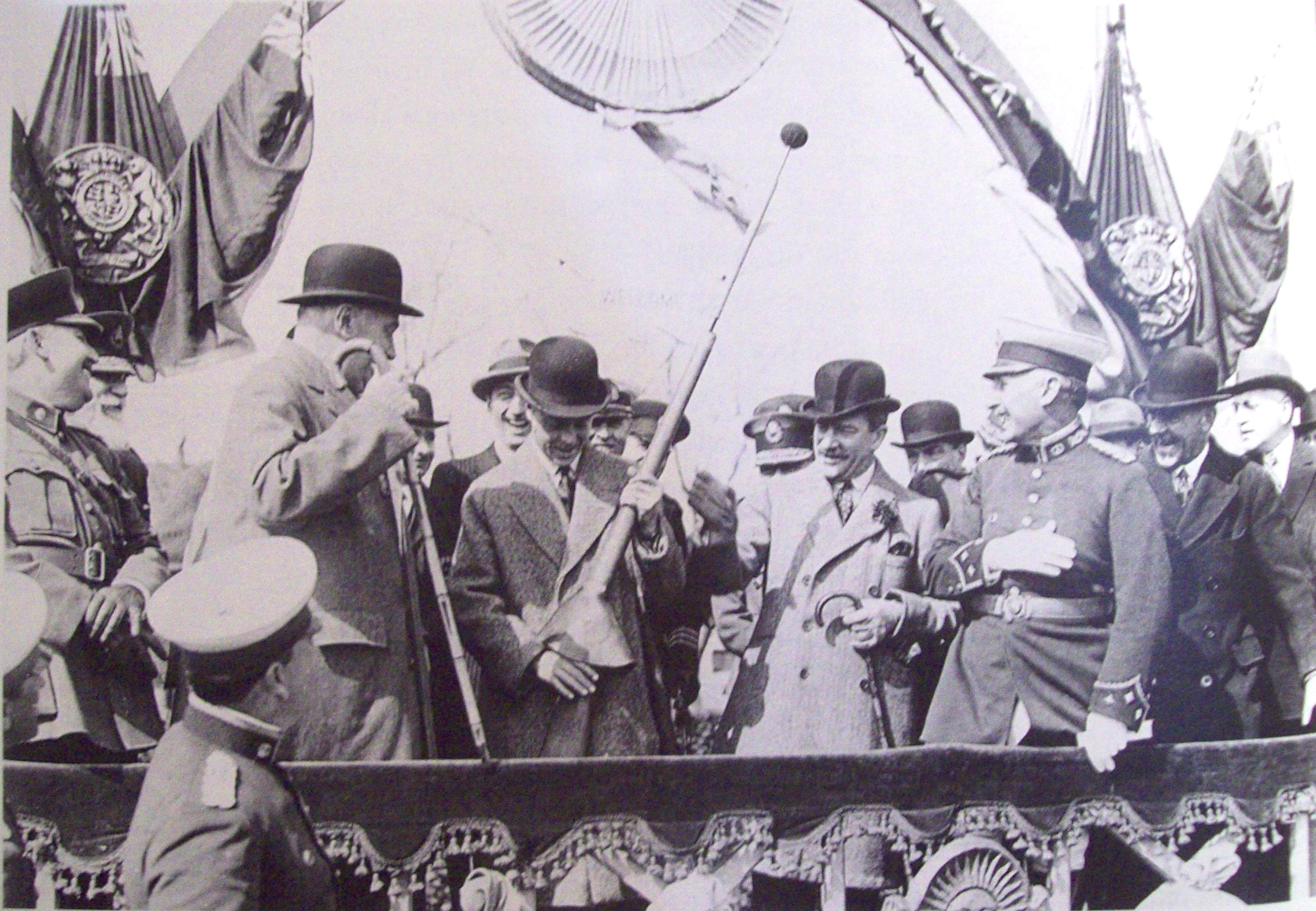
Alvear with the Prince of Wales, 1925.

This new proposal did not succeed either, and for this reason diplomatic relations with Chile cooled down during the short administration of Chilean President Emiliano Figueroa. In addition, Chile was militarily rearmed in 1926, in response to what Argentina had done in 1924. There was another Chilean attempt at disarmament by the new president, Colonel Carlos Ibáñez del Campo, but it was also rejected by Argentina.

On 24 March 1925, the scientist Albert Einstein and his wife Elsa arrived in Argentina —in the framework of a tour also carried out by Brazil and Uruguay— to stay in the country for exactly one month. It was a remarkable fact that Einstein traveled to Argentina during that period, since with his visit he certified the good state that the country was going through at that time. The scientist, known worldwide for his theory of relativity, came to meet with the Argentine president. He had arrived at an invitation from the University of Buenos Aires and the Argentine Hebraic Society, and during his stay he gave twelve lectures, the vast majority explaining the new theory.

On 17 August, the Prince of Wales, Edward of Windsor, heir to the British crown, arrived in Argentina. As a result of his visit and the Maharaja of Kapurthala, Alvear organized an excursion to Huetel (in the partido of 25 May, province of Buenos Aires), to the estancia of Concepción Unzué de Casares (a kind of palace in the style of the France of Louis XIII) in the Argentine pampas, where they heard Carlos Gardel sing. Prince of Wales, the Maharaja of Kapurthala and Prince Umberto of Savoy produced an excess in the expenses foreseen for the events, whose total amount was around 500,000 pesos. Minister Víctor Molina informed the president that the amount has been spent and proposed to pass the expense to general income, but Alvear decided to take over the payment of half a million pesos, for which he had the subdivision and sale of part of his inherited lands in Don Torcuato.

=== Oil policy ===
One of the first actions of the Alvear government was to appoint General Enrique Mosconi as general director of Yacimiento Petrolifos Fiscales (YPF). Mosconi promoted YPF's growth with government support, with the aim of achieving oil self-sufficiency, vital for the country's autonomous development, and promoted measures to reduce competition between YPF and foreign companies. He managed the construction of the La Plata Industrial Complex, launched for oil refining in 1925, which made the country independent from the purchase of gasoline. Five months after its licensing, the production of gasoline for airplanes began. This industrial plant was the tenth largest distillery in the world.

During his eight years in office, Mosconi almost tripled oil production, from 348,888 cubic meters in 1922 to 872,171 cubic meters in 1929. The state oil company YPF inaugurated the first kerosene pump on 22 February 1923 in Buenos Aires; three months later another six were installed. On 20 June, the first gasoline pump for vehicles was built in Mitre and Rosales Avenue, manufactured by the industrialist Torcuato Di Tella after consulting with his friend, General Mosconi. YPF had fifty thousand employees. Both oil and self-sufficiency became campaign issues during the year 1928, when oil exploitation began in the province of Salta; in 1933 oil would be discovered in Tranquitas, in the same province.

=== Public and cultural works ===
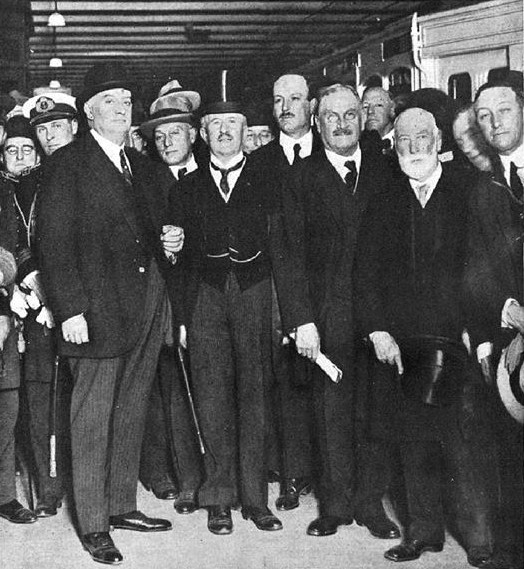
Marcelo T de Alvear inaugurating the Electric West Railway.

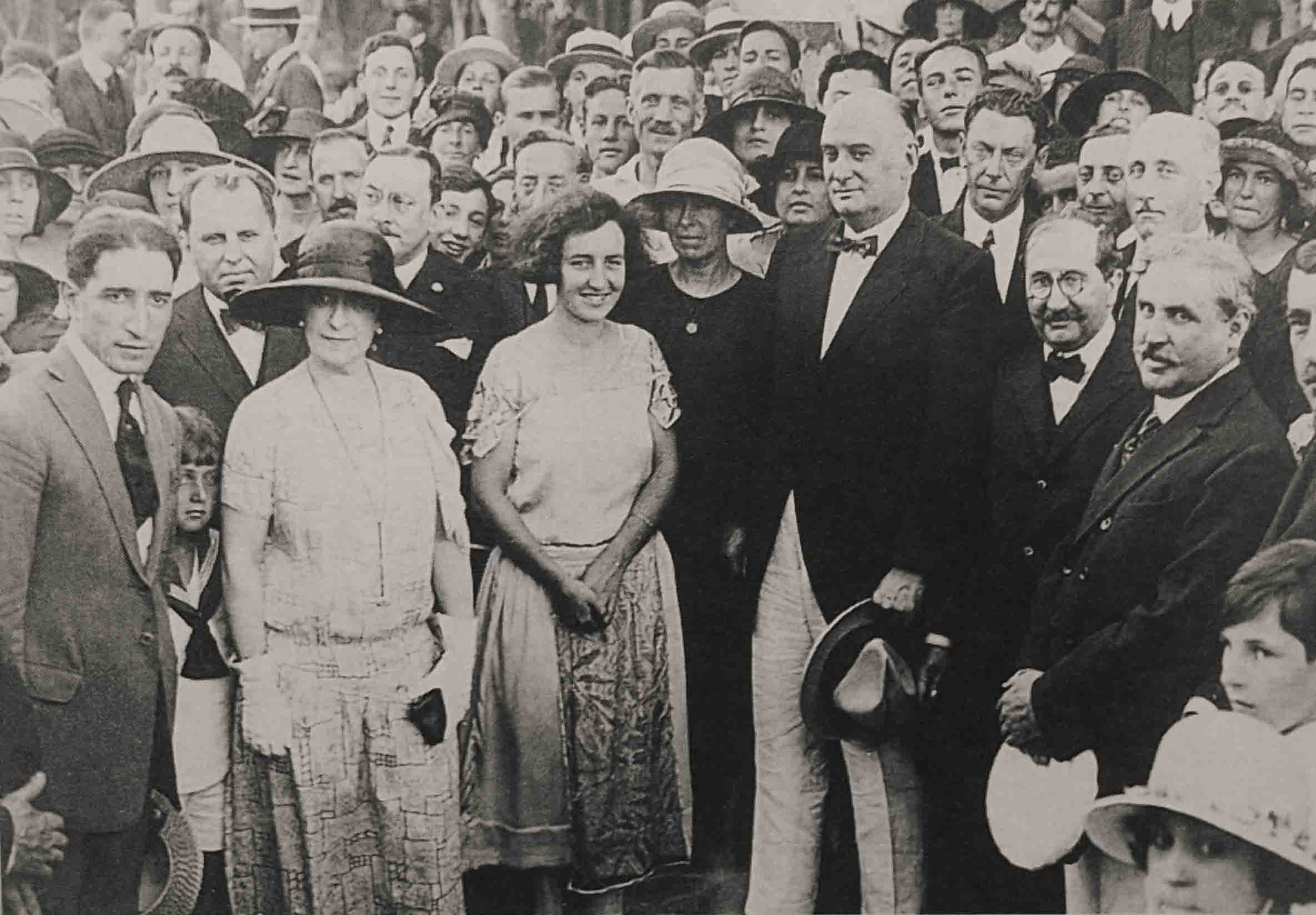
President Alvear with swimmer Lilian Harrison.

During this administration, a large number of monuments and public and private works were built; Unlike his predecessor, Alvear always tried to be present at ceremonies, inaugurations and all kinds of social events. Regarding public works, the construction of the Ministry of Finance, Public Works, War and Navy and the building of the National Bank in Plaza de Mayo began. It also promoted culture, with the construction of theaters, museums and various artistic institutions. According to various historians, more public works were inaugurated during his tenure than during that of any of his predecessors, and as many official ceremonies were held with the participation of the Head of State as had never been seen before.

In 1923 the Luján Museum was inaugurated. In the city of Buenos Aires the mayor Carlos Noel had an outstanding mandate; His works included the completion of the Paseo de la Costanera Sur, the construction of ovens for the incineration of garbage, and the purchase of the Lezica farm to build the Rivadavia park. Noel also had many streets of the city paved.

In 1923 the president sent to the National Congress a project to form a national delegation to participate in the 1924 Paris Olympic Games, but the initiative did not prosper. On 31 December of that year, a decree was signed creating the Argentine Olympic Committee and thus the concurrence of Argentina to the Olympic Games was resolved, counting to cover the expenses with 250,000 pesos from an amount not collected in the National Lottery, with based on law 11 067. Thus, the first official participation in the Olympic Games by Argentina took place in 1924.

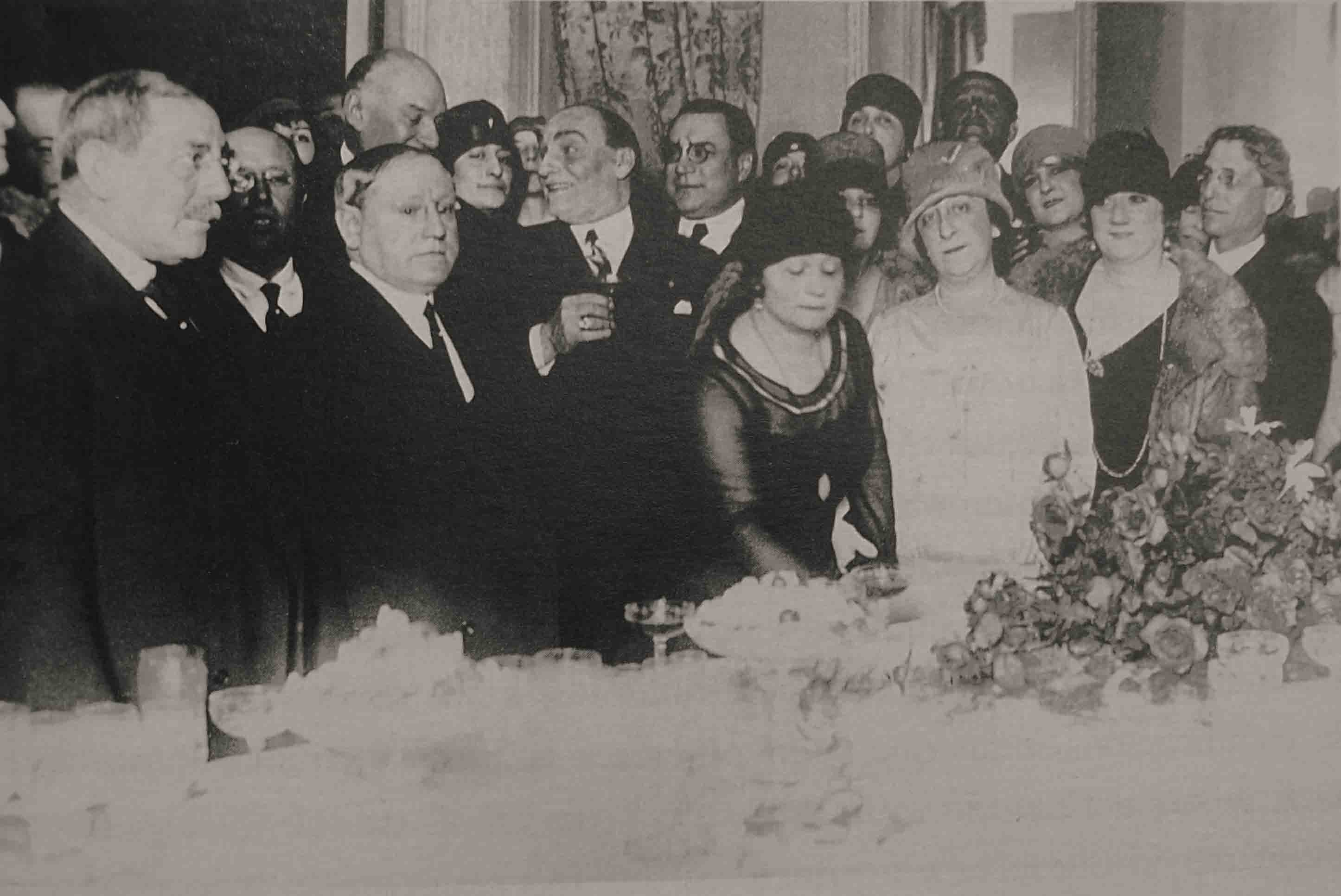
The Alvear's at the Casa del Teatro.

At the initiative of his wife, Regina Pacini, and motivated by the memories of the difficult times their parents had to go through, it occurred to him to found an institution that would protect them. He debated the idea with Enrique García Velloso and Angelina Pagano, among others, and called on theater entrepreneurs and artists. On 30 December 1927, the Deliberative Council granted the concession of a site for fifty years located in Santa Fe in 1200, while the Colón Theater gave special functions to raise funds; at the evening held at the Colón Beniamino Gigli and Claudia Muzzio sang. This is how the Casa del Teatro was born. Similarly, at the initiative of Pacini, Alvear authorized by decree the creation of the Municipal Radio 710 KHz, officially dedicated to broadcasting the season of operas and concerts from the Colón Theater, so that people who could not attend the theater could listen to classical music. The first broadcast was on 23 May and Giuseppe Verdi's opera Rigoletto was broadcast.

=== The division of radicalism ===
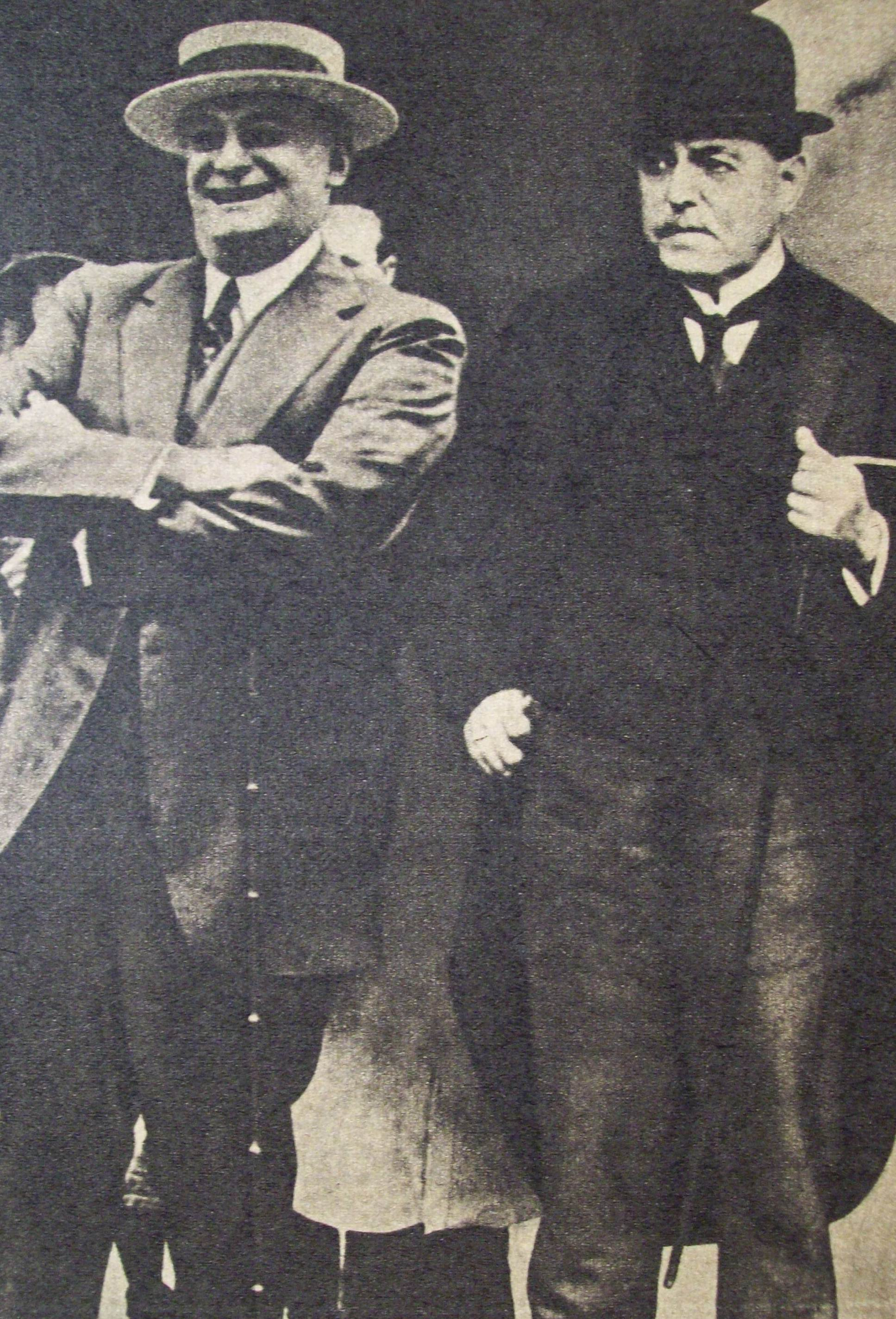
Alvear with Hipólito Yrigoyen.

The division of the radical party became inevitable in 1923: nine radical senators declared themselves "anti-personalists," that is, against Yrigoyen's personalism, and gave their support to President Alvear.

There were also frictions between him and his vice president Elpidio González, since the latter was a Yrigoyenista; In fact, the division began when the senators began to harass Vice President González. Yrigoyenismo took the antipersonalists as conservatives, while the antipersonalists considered that Yrigoyen violated the rules of the political game. These disputes continued and, what was worse, they moved to Congress, where the deputies loyal to Yrigoyen came to obstruct several of the initiatives that emerged from the Executive Power, either through discussions or by withdrawing from the premises to avoid giving a quorum. In this context, in January 1925 President Alvear closed the extraordinary sessions by decree, as legislative activity was almost nil.

== 1928 election ==
The Radical Civic Union was divided into two political parties as the presidential elections of 1928 approached: on the one hand, the followers of Yrigoyen, called "personalistas", promoted the leader himself as a candidate for president of the nation together with Francisco Beiró; On the other hand, the UCRA presented the Leopoldo Melo-Vicente Gallo formula, while the conservatives led by Julio A. Roca decided to abstain and support the antipersonnelists.

Yrigoyen's victory in the 1928 elections was overwhelming: with 62% of the votes, he was again elected president. When Alvear went to transfer command to him on 12 October, his supporters began to threaten him, shouting "¡traitor! ”, at which Alvear pounced on them ready to start a fight; but some people held him back to avoid a pitched battle. Alvear tried to shorten distances with Yrigoyen, and visited him in December 1928, after several years without seeing the caudillo.

== Later life ==
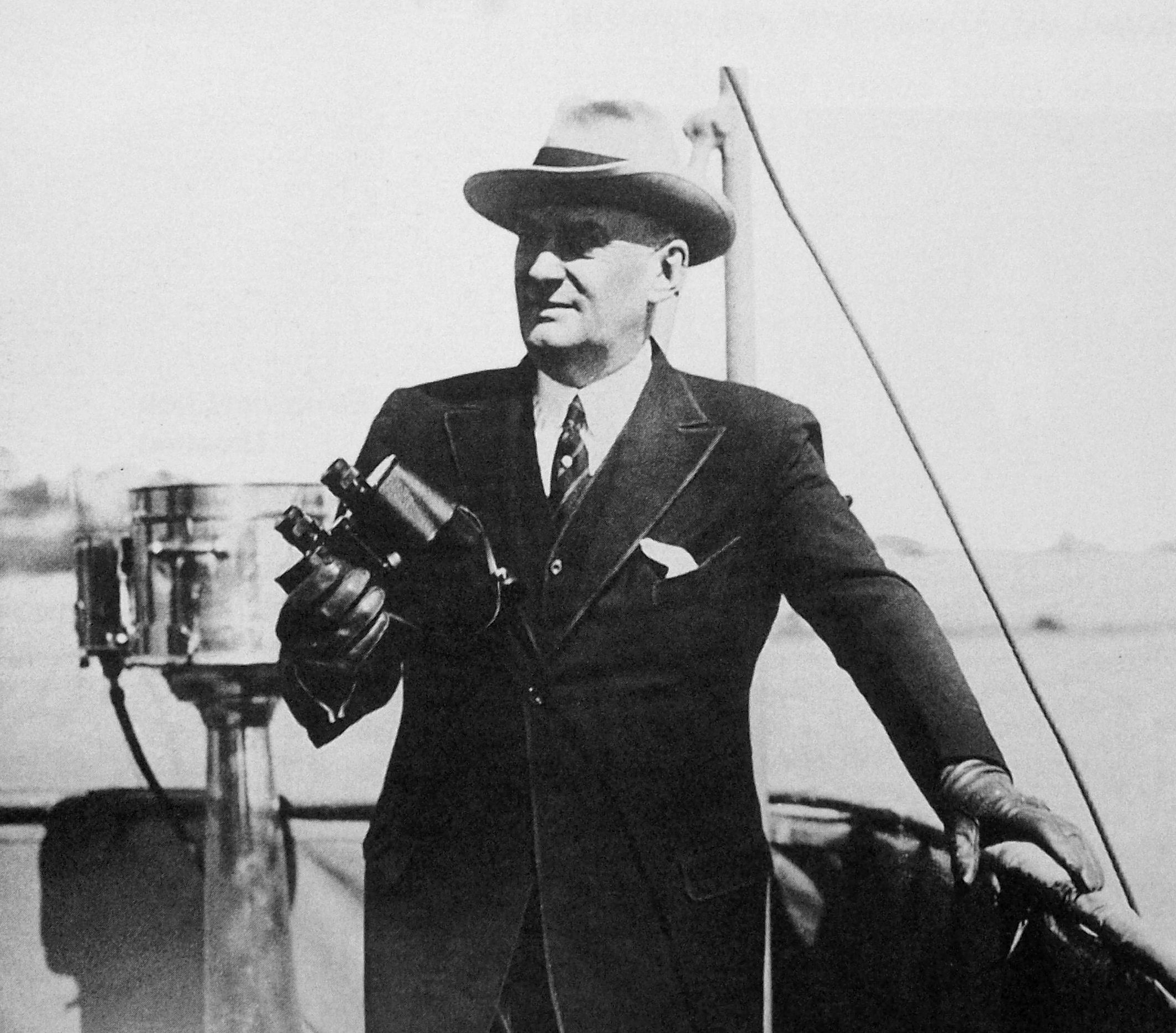
Alvear aboard a boat.

Once his government ended, Alvear settled in 1930 in Paris, a city that he was passionate about personally. Installed in Europe, his relatives sent him letters from Argentina explaining the chaotic situation in which the country's politics was, such as the deteriorated figure of Hipólito Yrigoyen. This is how he learned about the coup d'état by José Félix Uriburu. This fact had not surprised him, since the economic crisis of 1929 and the lack of reaction on the part of an elderly and ill Yrigoyen had rapidly deteriorated his power. During the period from 1928 until the coup occurred in 1930, Alvear was informed of the Argentine political situation only through the numerous letters sent to him by his friends – in most cases from the anti-personalists most opposed to Yrigoyen. – which for the most part described to him a much more chaotic situation than it really was.

He made stern public statements about the personalist deviation from radicalism and about the character of the radical third government; He returned to the country under the impulse of duty, to put his personal influence at the service of the regrouping of the various fractions of radicalism, when he understood that the men of 6 September intended to govern without the consecration of the people, thereby altering the structures democratic institutions for which he had fought for more than forty years.

=== Return to Argentina ===
On 11 April 1931 Alvear embarked for Buenos Aires, where he arrived on 25 April, received at the port by some 6000 people, among whom were General Justo and an aide representing the de facto president José Félix Uriburu. Alvear he met with Uriburu, who told the radical leader that he could regain the presidency, as long as he guaranteed that there were no Yrigoyenists on his list; but Alvear rejected that proposal and began the efforts to unify the radicalism around his figure.

On 20 July 1931 a revolution broke out in the province of Corrientes, led by Lieutenant Colonel Gregorio Pomar. Although it was quickly repressed, it gave Uriburu the excuse he was looking for: the government denounced the existence of a terrorist plan and ordered the raid on the radical premises, which forced several political leaders, including Alvear himself, to go into exile from the country .

At 10 p.m. on 28 July 1931, he went into exile, one day after having drawn up a manifesto that the dictatorship prohibited him from publishing, and which he therefore had to spread clandestinely.

When Yrigoyen died in July 1933, he was recognized as the undisputed leader of radicalism. He governed the party as he had governed the country: respectful of its organic statute, of the district autonomies, of the personality of its members, giving an example of conciliation.

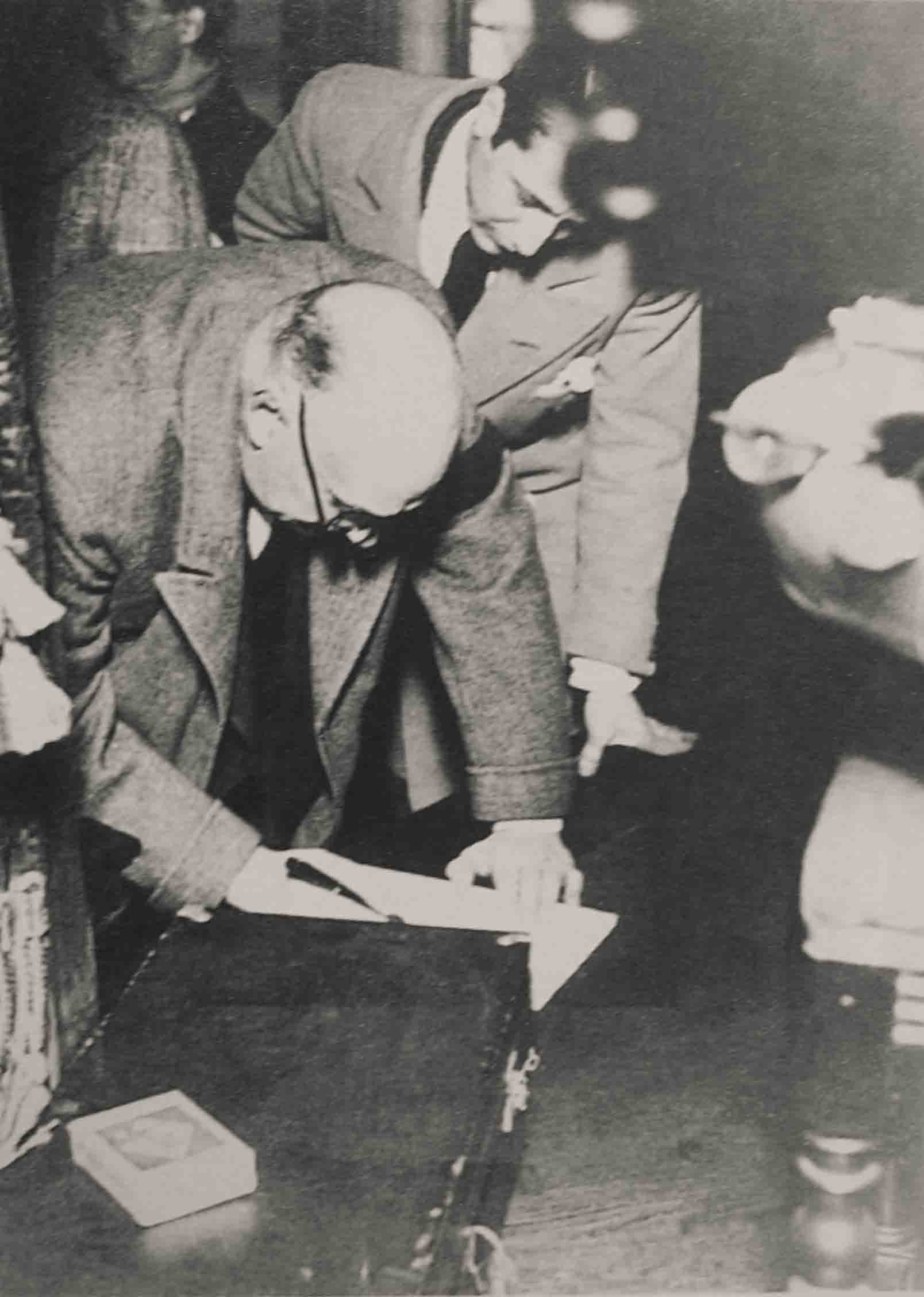
Alvear signs letter heading for exile.

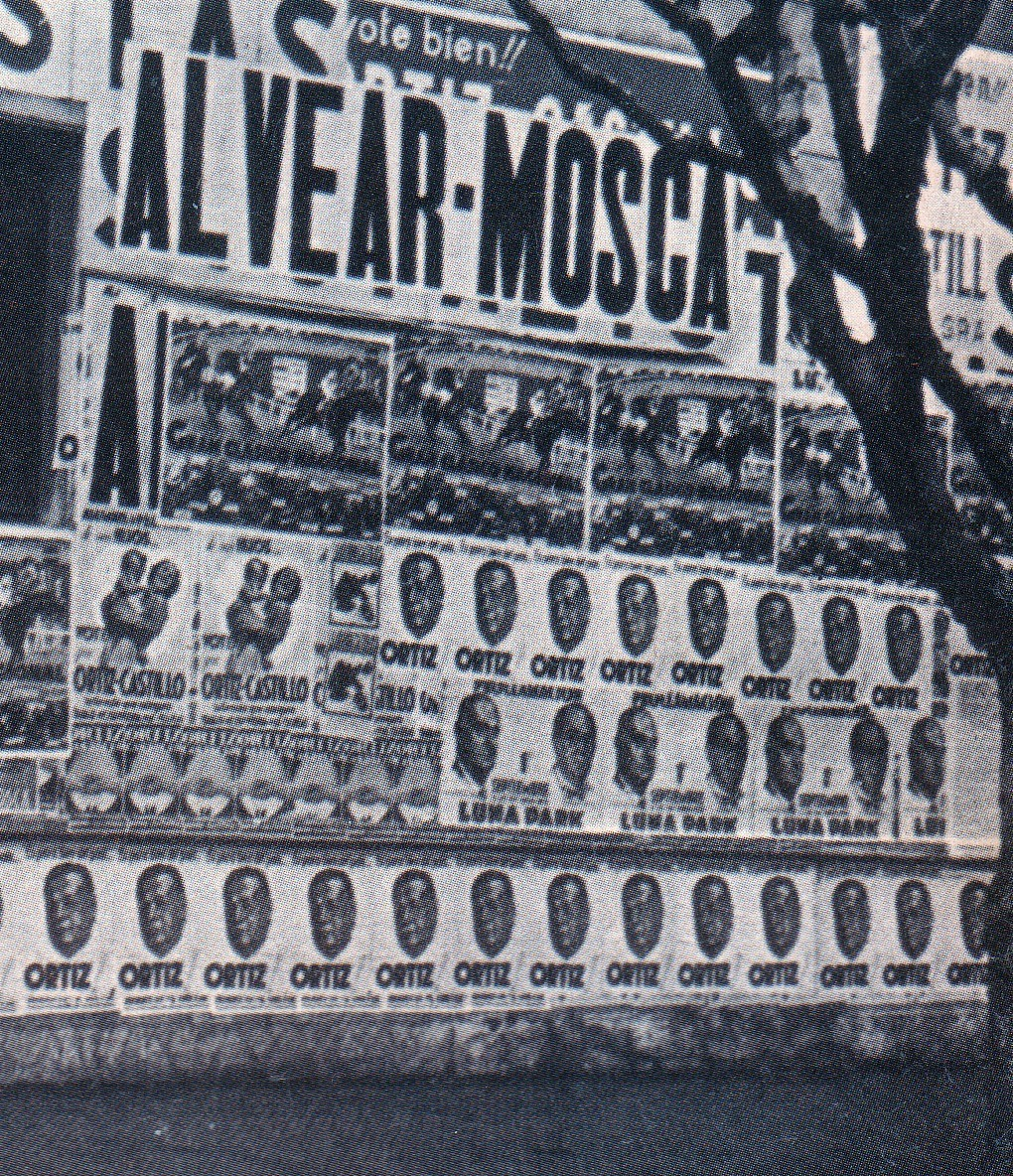
Alvear-Mosca's political slogan.

=== 1937 Presidential election ===
The committee's office of 2 January 1935 decided to lift the electoral abstention. The initiative was approved with 98 votes to 49, and radicalism thus began to run in elections to elect national governors and deputies, some fraudulent and others not. In some electoral contests, radicalism emerged victorious, as was the case with the province of Entre Ríos in the 1935 elections, for which Alvear campaigned for the first time, visiting a large number of towns and giving several speeches a day. But he himself was beginning to be criticized as an accomplice of the Justista electoral regime. For this reason, during 1935 the Yrigoyen and intransigent leaders began to gather, criticizing the Alvearista leadership. But by 1936 Alvearismo led the party with almost no internal resistance, since Alvear's harsh character – labeled as dictatorial by some leaders – led to the abandonment of internal critics.

Radicalism managed to win in the provincial elections of November 1935, and in the elections of March of the following year, in which eighty-two seats of deputies were renewed, Alvear went out to campaign in the provinces of the coast and north of Argentina. In those of Santa Fe, Mendoza, Salta and Buenos Aires (the latter to a lesser extent) the elections were victims again of the same vices, although in the remaining elections the elections were carried out relatively normally; thus, radicalism managed to win in the provinces of Santa Fe, Buenos Aires, Córdoba and Entre Ríos.

On 12 February 1937 Alvear met with President Justo with the idea that he would guarantee him an electoral act clean of fraud; It was the first time they had seen each other since 1931. The following day, the Interior Minister called Alvear and told him that some points of the interview would be fulfilled, a fact that did not happen, since the Santa Fe elections were signed by the same vices.

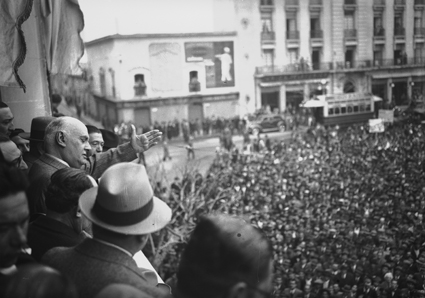
Alvear with Sabattini in Cordoba doing political campaign.

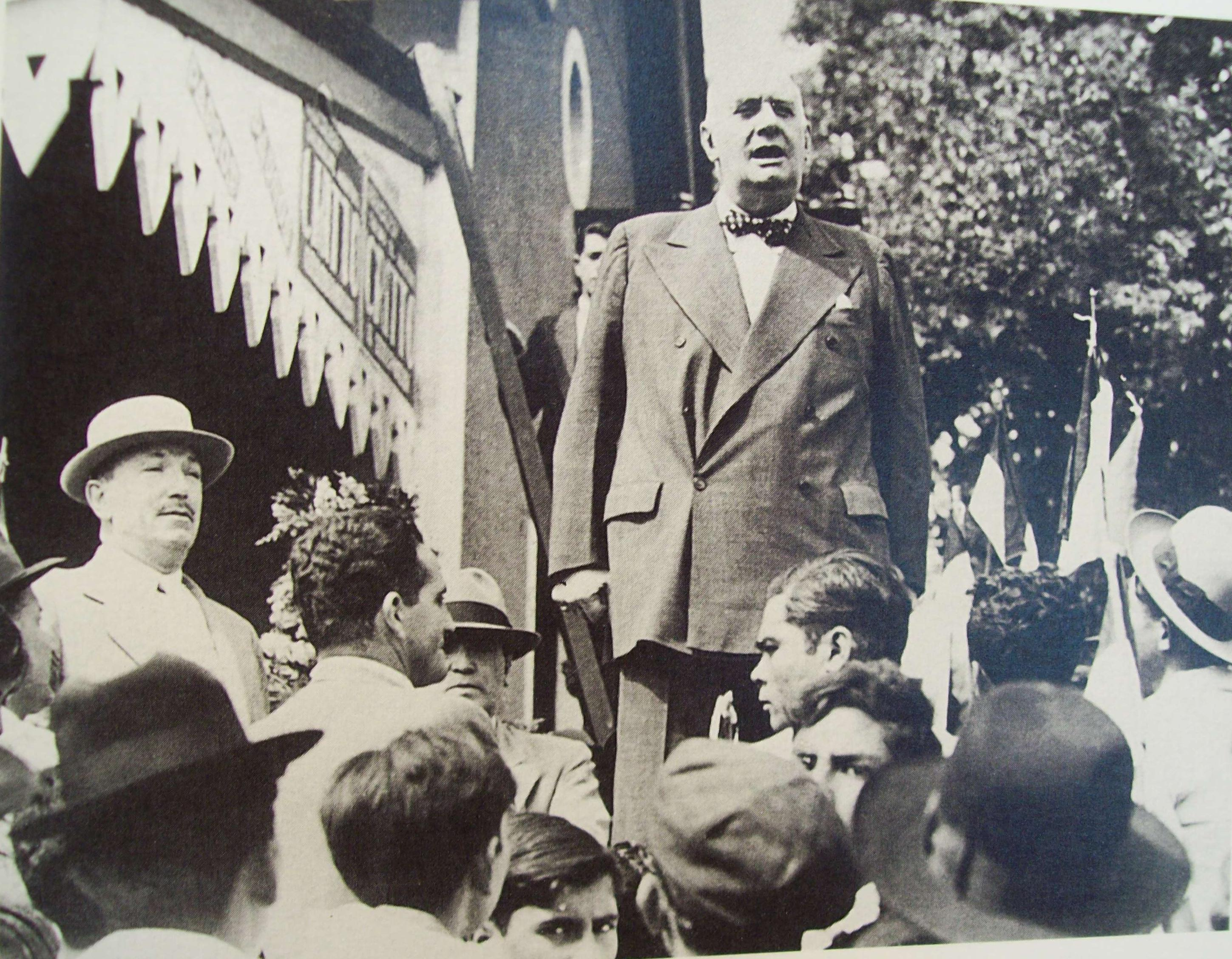
Alvear of campaign in Tucuman.

On 28 May 1937, the presidential binomial was voted on at the Coliseo theater. Among the vice presidential candidates were Mosca, Pueyrredón, Güemes and Laurencena. Alvear unanimously won the candidacy for the presidency, while Mosca won the candidacy for the vice-presidency by 145 votes compared to the 24, 8 and 4 that Laurencena, Pueyrredón and Güemes obtained, respectively.

On 5 September 1937, an enthusiastic crowd gathered at Luna Park, acclaimed his name as a candidate for the presidency of the Nation. He was 69 years old. The presidential elections were held, in which the candidate of the Concordance Roberto M. Ortiz, a radical antipersonnel who had been Minister of Public Works during the presidency of Alvear, triumphed; this managed to gather almost 42% of the votes, although it only obtained 127 voters against 245 for Ortiz. The radicalism made several denunciations of electoral fraud in most of the provinces, but Ortiz was proclaimed president. He was defeated in the elections, which were not free elections, but the result of pressure and fraud; but he did not faint from frustration and continued fighting for the Constitution and democracy.

The fact that Alvear and Ortiz died respectively in March and July 1942 meant that neither of the two main candidates in the election survived long enough to see the end of the presidential term they contested.

During the last years of his life, he made party tours throughout the country. In political events he was accompanied by young radicals who later became prominent party politicians, such as Ricardo Balbín and Crisologo Larralde.

=== Last years and death ===
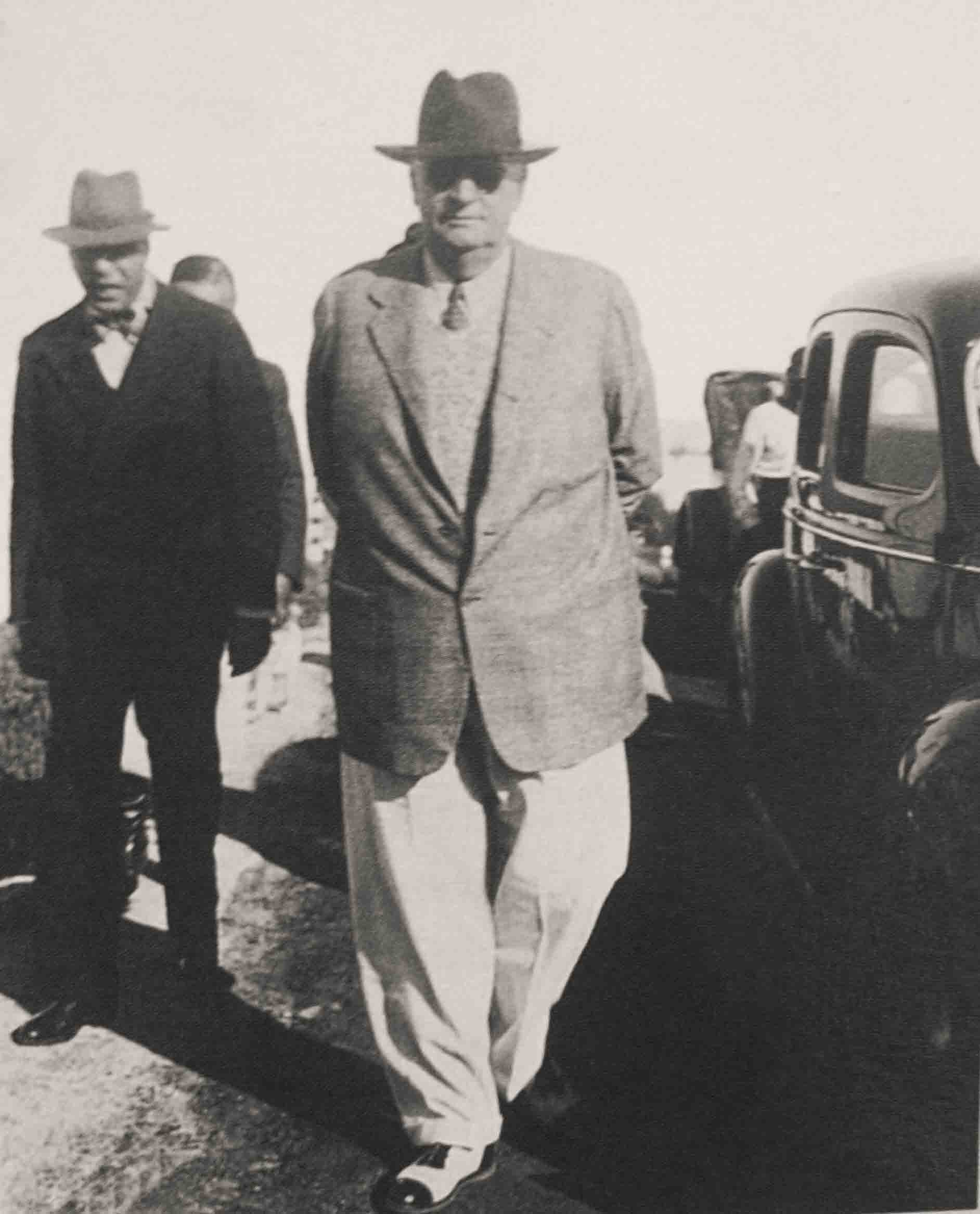
Alvear in 1940.

By the end of the 1930s, Alvear's health had deteriorated, as a result of a flu from which it was difficult for him to recover and the political situation that the country was experiencing in those years. During a meeting of the National Committee, the surprise resignation of Alvear was read, made to leave the way to Tamborini clear. A delegation went to his home in Don Torcuato to inform him that the committee had rejected his resignation. Alvear could not receive them due to his delicate state of health, but with his secretary as an intermediary, he thanked them for the visit with the conclusion that "I am very ill, with one foot in the grave."

On 23 March 1942, struck down by a heart attack, Marcelo Torcuato de Alvear died next to his wife Regina Pacini at their home in Don Torcuato. A significant number of people moved to the town to say goodbye to the old president, despite the fact that it had rained for much of the day. The following day he was transferred to the Casa Rosada and watched over by the "official" authorities, precisely by those who had closed his access to the presidency through electoral fraud. Several leaders who had won thanks to fraud, such as Roberto Marcelino Ortiz, Agustín Pedro Justo and Rodolfo Moreno, gave Alvear words of praise.

During his funeral, incidents occurred when a crowd of people forcibly stole the coffin from the official funeral liturgy held at the Casa Rosada; the coffin was carried by the people chanting slogans against the government to the Recoleta Cemetery. His remains are in the family mausoleum of the Recoleta Cemetery, together with those of his grandfather Carlos María de Alvear and his father Torcuato de Alvear, next to the grave of Juan Facundo Quiroga. The mausoleum was designed by the architect Alejandro Christophersen in 1905.

== Tribute and legacy ==
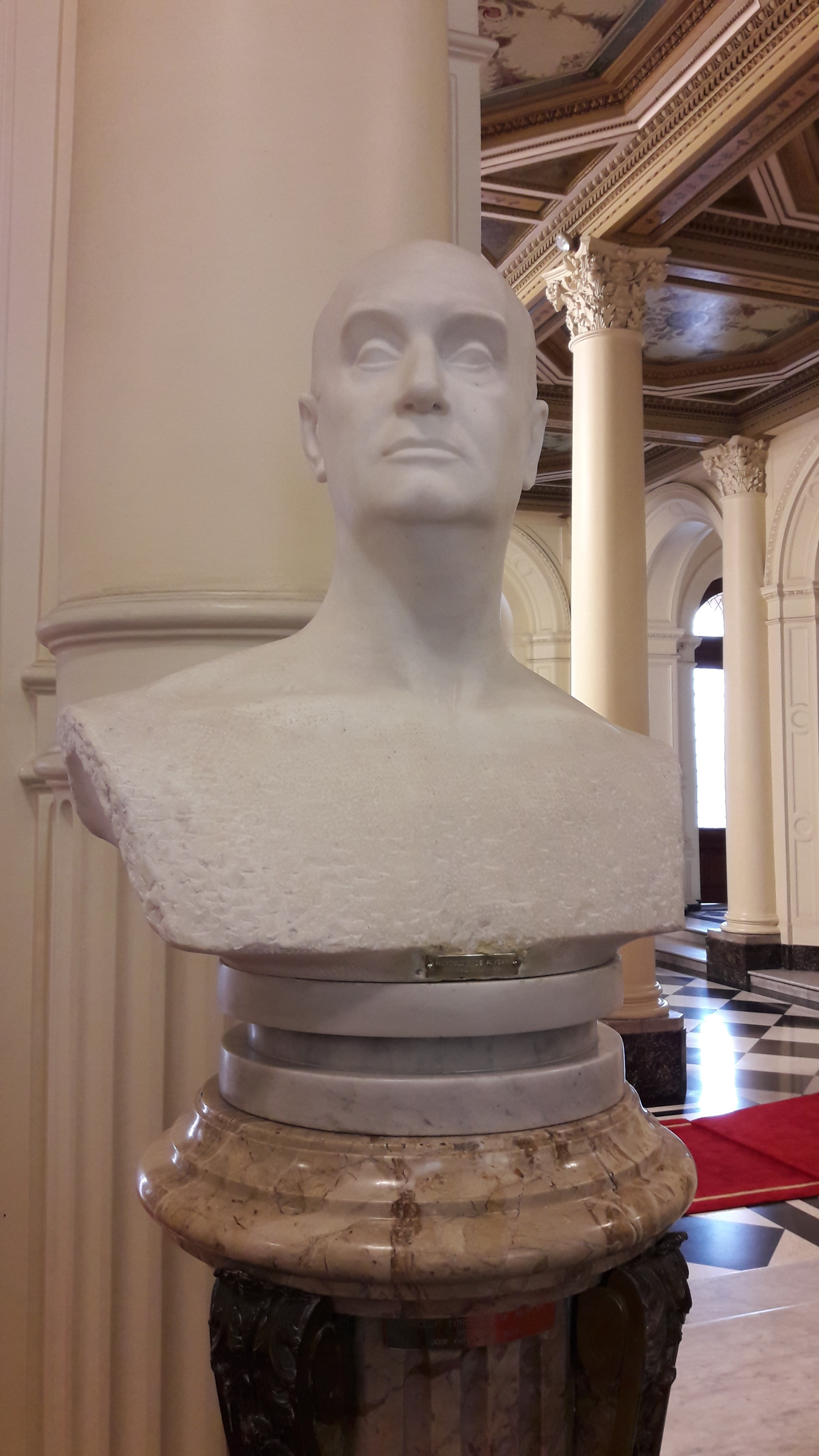
Alvear bust in the busts room of the Casa Rosada.

He is considered by many to be a good president, who knew how to lead Argentina on the path of progress in the brilliant years of the 1920s. The cartoonists used to caricature the corpulent figure of Alvear in several of the situations, such as his attempt to correctly accommodate himself in an armchair, since the president was forced to turn his chair to do so and thus be able to cross his long legs; or hurriedly leaving Congress to go to the beach at Mar del Plata or vice versa, referring to his habit of spending vacations in that city. His patience in the face of the exhausting division that shook radicalism was also a common point of several humorists of the time. The cartoonists baptized him as the bald man, in "opposition" to the hairy one that was Hipólito Yrigoyen.

The newspaper La Prensa paid tribute to Alvear's personality:

Last night the life of a citizen who rendered eminent services to the country and who was an example of civic virtues through half a century of public performance was extinguished. Alvear knew, in short, the satisfactions, concerns and bitterness that the exercise of public functions and political activities provide; he showed, in his tireless dedication, in an incessant approach to the fundamental problems of the country and in his fervent preaching of democratic principles, which both since the level as from the highest positions it is possible to be useful to the country when it is loved dearly and only its good is pursued.

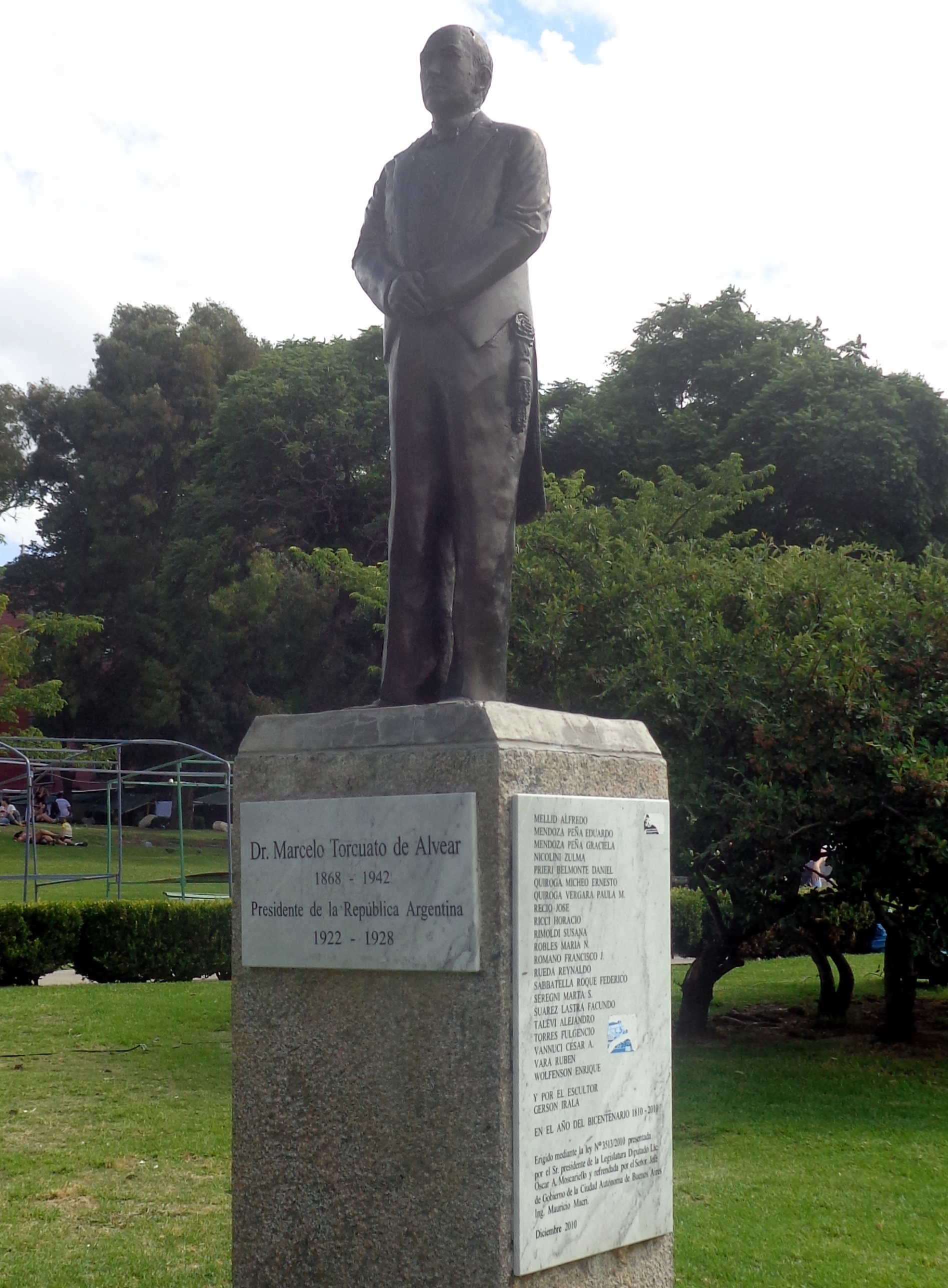
Statue of Marcelo Torcuato de Alvear, in Recoleta, Buenos Aires.

One of the first tributes to Marcelo Torcuato de Alvear was the inauguration of the Presidente Alvear Theater, on 23 March 1942, a month after the death of the former president.

The father and geographer Alberto María de Agostini gave the name Sierra Alvear to a mountain range in the Andes Mountains, which includes the highest peaks in the Argentine part of the Island of Tierra del Fuego. On 23 March 2017, on the 75th anniversary of Alvear's death, the UCR paid tribute to the former president at the Bicentennial Museum, where a space with objects of him was also inaugurated to remember his figure.

To this is added the wide number of towns and streets named in his honor and that of his family:

- Village Alvear, Santa Fe.
- Department General Alvear, Buenos Aires (Province).
- Municipality and village General Alvear, Misiones.
- Department General Alvear, Mendoza.
- Department General Alvear, Corrientes.
- City Alvear, Corrientes.

== Honours ==
Coat of arms of Alvear as knight of the Order of Charles III.

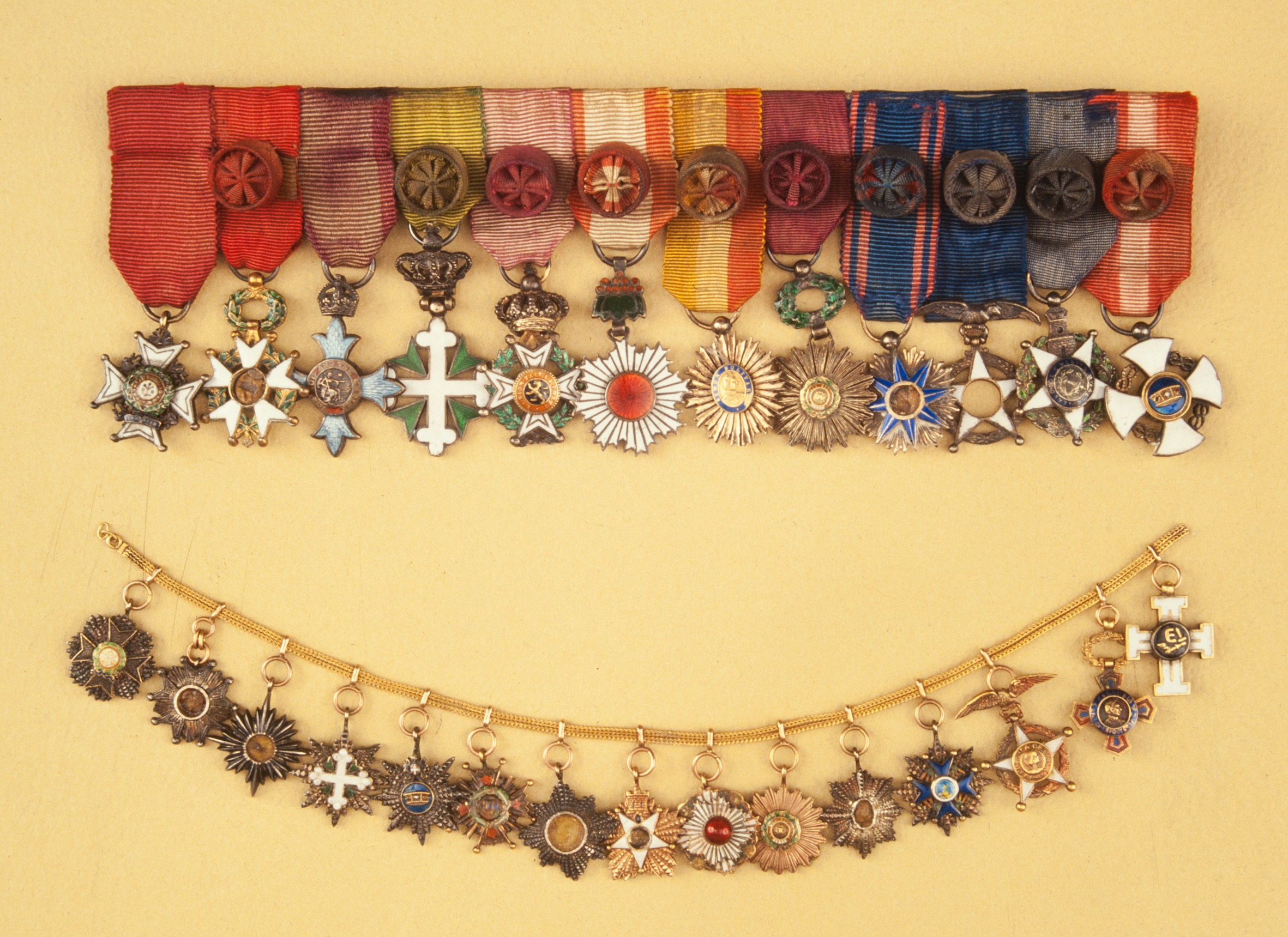
Foreign decorations of Marcelo T. de Alvear.

=== Decorations ===
Award or decoration	Country
Grand Cordon of the Order of Leopold	Belgium
Grand Cross of the Order of Merit	Chile
Grade I, Clase I of the Cross of Liberty	Estonia
Knight Grand Cross of the Order of the Legion of Honour	France
Knight Grand Cross of the Order of Saints Maurice and Lazarus	Italy
Knight Grand Cross of the Order of the Crown of Italy	Italy
Grand Cordon of the Order of the Chrysanthemum	Japan
Grand Cross of the Order of the Sun of Peru	Peru
Grand Cross of the Order of the Tower and Sword	Portugal
Knight of the Collar of the Order of Charles III	Spain
Honorary Knight Grand Cross of the Order of the Bath	United Kingdom
Knight Grand Cross of the Order of the British Empire	United Kingdom
Grand Cordon of the Order of the Liberator	Venezuela
Grand Cross of the Order of Pope Pius IX	Vatican

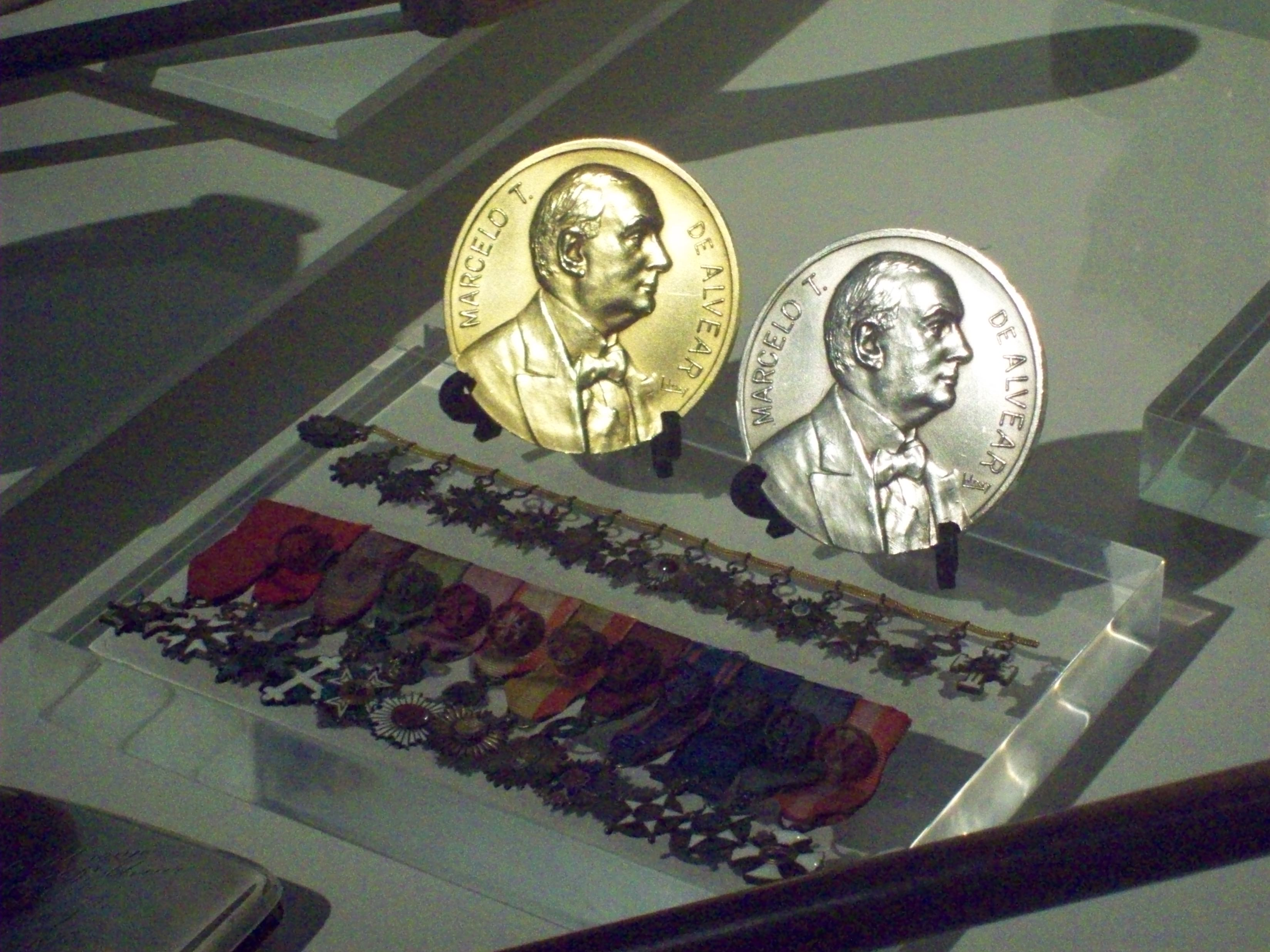
Alvear decorations.

== See also ==
- History of Argentina (The Radicals in Power, 1916-1930)

Political offices
Preceded by Hipólito Yrigoyen	President of Argentina; 1922–1928	Succeeded by Hipólito Yrigoyen
Party political offices
Preceded by José María Martinez	President of the Radical Civic Union Committee; 1931–1942	Succeeded by Gabriel Oddone
