= Regina Pacini =

Portuguese opera singer and First Lady of Argentina

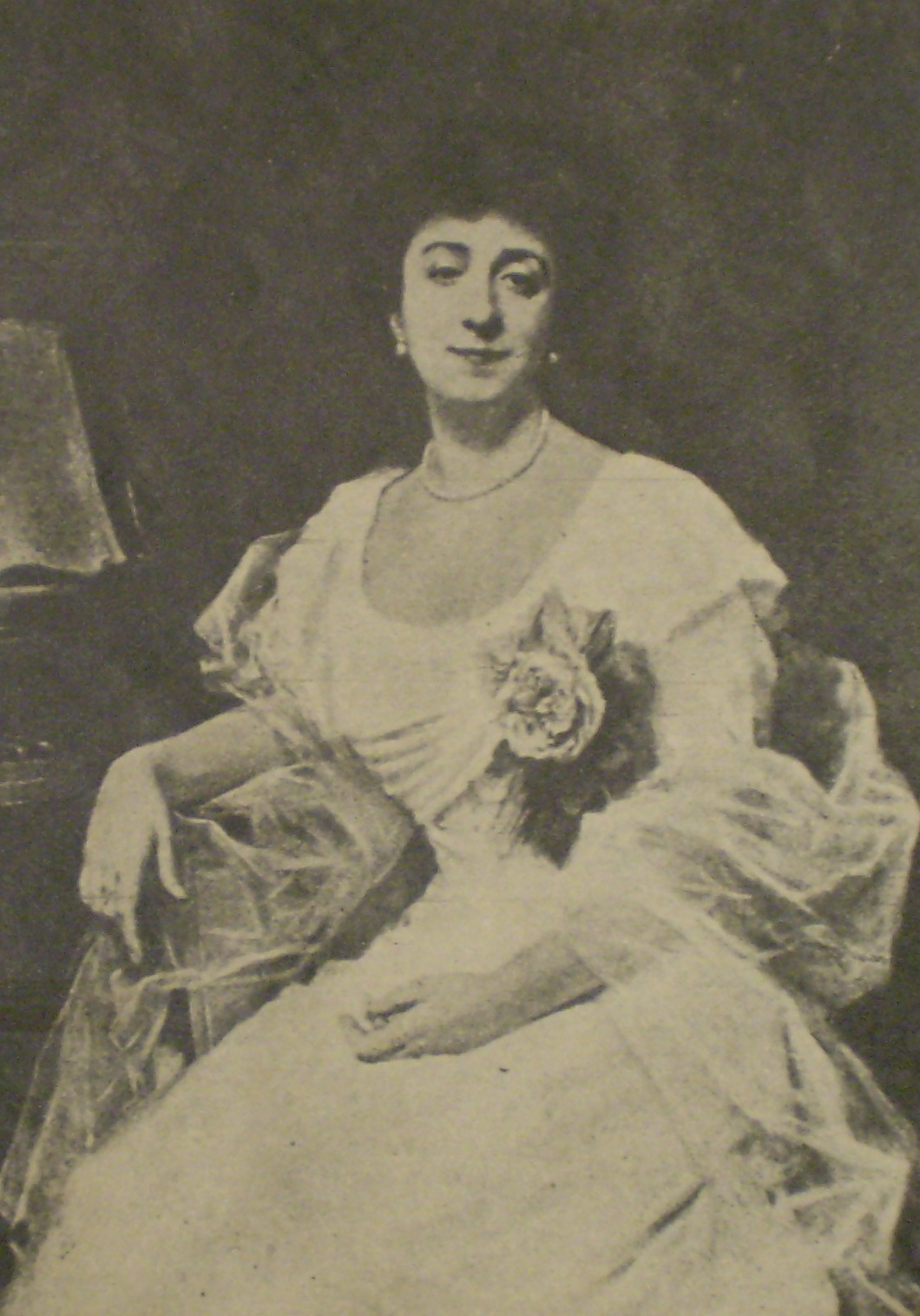

First Lady of Argentina
- In role 12 October 1922 – 12 October 1928
- President: Marcelo Torcuato de Alvear
- Preceded by: Emily Henry de la Plaza
- Succeeded by: Aurelia Madero Buján de Uriburu

Personal details
- Born: Regina Isabel Luisa Pacini Quintero; January 6, 1871 Lisbon, Portugal
- Died: September 18, 1965 (aged 94) Buenos Aires, Argentina
- Spouse: Marcelo Torcuato de Alvear

Regina Isabel Luisa Pacini Quintero (January 6, 1871 – September 18, 1965) was a Portuguese lyric soprano, and First Lady of Argentina as the wife of Marcelo Torcuato de Alvear.

== Biography ==
Pacini was born on January 6, 1871, in Lisbon, Portugal. Her father was the Italian baritone Pietro Andrea Giorgi-Pacini; her mother was Felisa Quintero.

As soprano, Pacini was a major exponent of bel canto. She studied in Paris with Mathilde Marchesi. Her debut performance was in 1888, when she performed as Amina in Bellini's La Sonnambula at the Lisbon Theatre. Pacini continued to sing at the Lisbon Theatre until 1904.

During 1889, Pacini performed internationally, singing in Milan, Palermo and London. In 1890, she first appeared at the Teatro Real to perform La Sonnambula. She performed at the Teatro Real regularly until 1905. In 1899, Pacini performed at the Teatro Solis, Montevideo, and the Politeama Theatre, Buenos Aires. It was at the Politeama Theatre that she met Marcelo Torcuato de Alvear, the future president of Argentina (1922-1928). Alvear proposed to Pacini and followed her around the world for a number of years until she accepted his proposal.

The new century brought performances for Pacini in different Italian theaters, including San Carlo, Naples, and La Scala, Milan. In 1907, Pacini married Alvear and retired from performing. During World War I, the couple lived in Paris. In 1938, Alvear founded the Casa del Teatro in Buenos Aires. In honour of Pacini, he named the Regina Theatre in her honor. Pacini died in Buenos Aires on September 18, 1965.
