= Tranquitas =

Coordinates: 26°37′S 65°02′W

- Municipality and village
- Interactive map of Tranquitas
- Country: Argentina
- Province: Salta Province
- Time zone: UTC−3 (ART)

Tranquitas is a village and rural municipality in Salta Province in northwestern Argentina.
