= General Alvear, Misiones =

Coordinates: 27°25′35″S 55°10′10″W

General Alvear (Misiones)
- Municipality and village
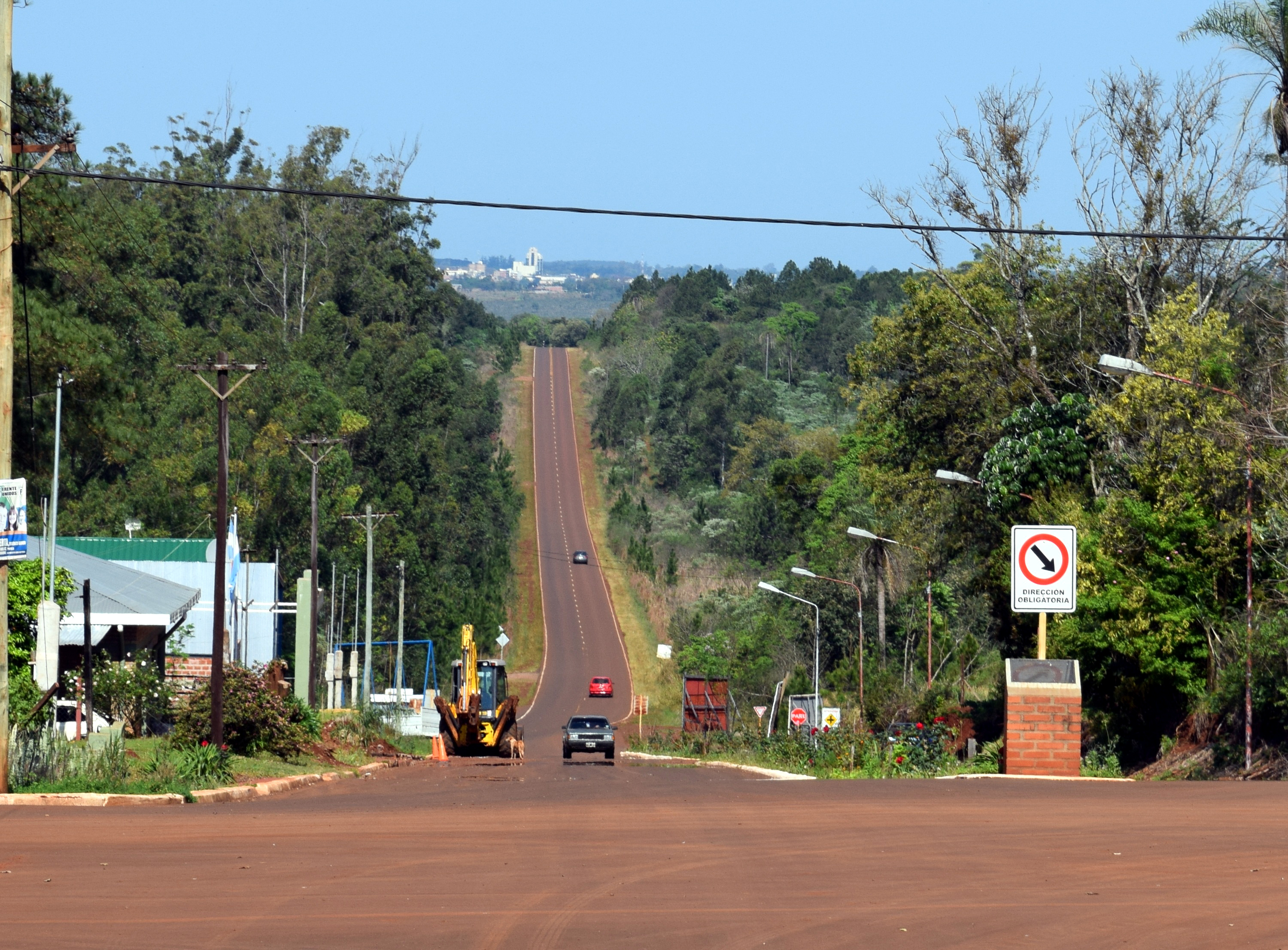
- Interactive map of General Alvear (Misiones)
- Country: Argentina
- Province: Misiones Province
- Time zone: UTC−3 (ART)

General Alvear (Misiones) is a village and municipality in Misiones Province in north-eastern Argentina.
