= 1994 =

1994 in various calendars
- Gregorian calendar: 1994; MCMXCIV
- Ab urbe condita: 2747
- Armenian calendar: 1443; ԹՎ ՌՆԽԳ
- Assyrian calendar: 6744
- Baháʼí calendar: 150–151
- Balinese saka calendar: 1915–1916
- Bengali calendar: 1400–1401
- Berber calendar: 2944
- British Regnal year: 42 Eliz. 2 – 43 Eliz. 2
- Buddhist calendar: 2538
- Burmese calendar: 1356
- Byzantine calendar: 7502–7503
- Chinese calendar: 癸酉年 (Water Rooster); 4691 or 4484 — to — 甲戌年 (Wood Dog); 4692 or 4485
- Coptic calendar: 1710–1711
- Discordian calendar: 3160
- Ethiopian calendar: 1986–1987
- Hebrew calendar: 5754–5755
- Hindu calendars
- Vikram Samvat: 2050–2051
- Shaka Samvat: 1915–1916
- Kali Yuga: 5094–5095
- Holocene calendar: 11994
- Igbo calendar: 994–995
- Iranian calendar: 1372–1373
- Islamic calendar: 1414–1415
- Japanese calendar: Heisei 6 (平成６年)
- Javanese calendar: 1926–1927
- Juche calendar: 83
- Julian calendar: Gregorian minus 13 days
- Korean calendar: 4327
- Minguo calendar: ROC 83 民國83年
- Nanakshahi calendar: 526
- Thai solar calendar: 2537
- Tibetan calendar: ཆུ་མོ་བྱ་ལོ་ (female Water-Bird); 2120 or 1739 or 967 — to — ཤིང་ཕོ་ཁྱི་ལོ་ (male Wood-Dog); 2121 or 1740 or 968
- Unix time: 757382400 – 788918399

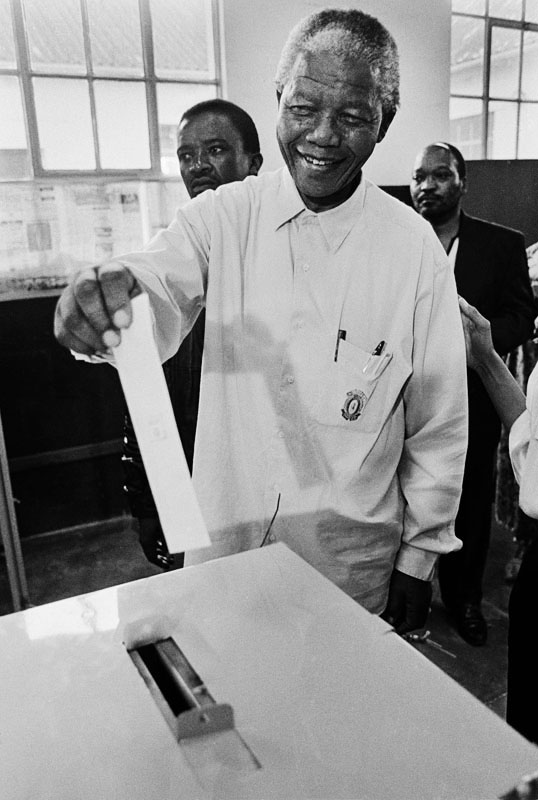
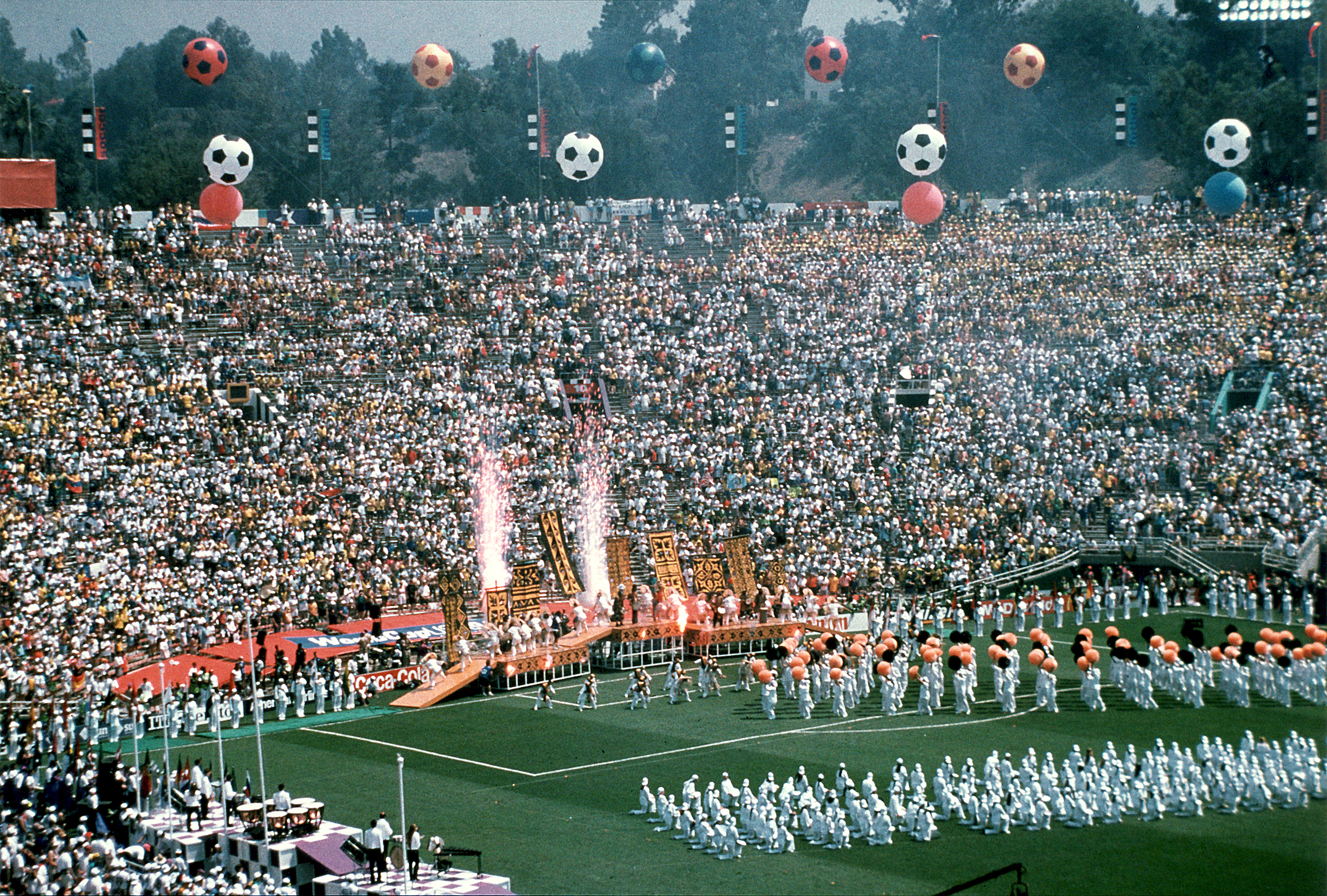
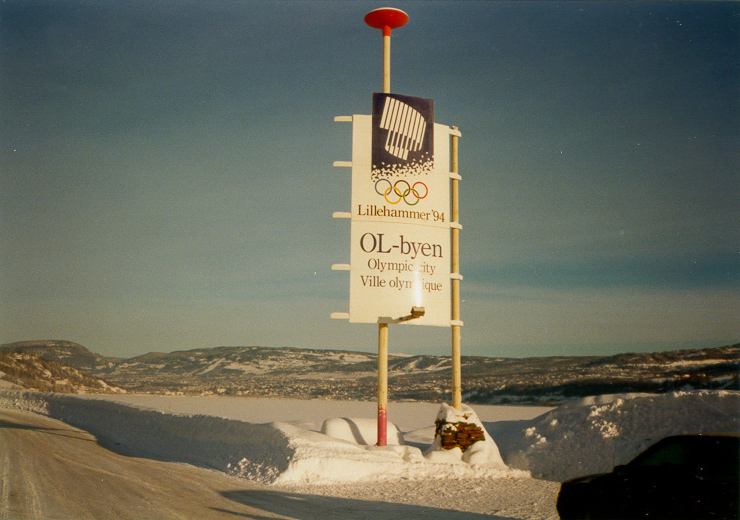
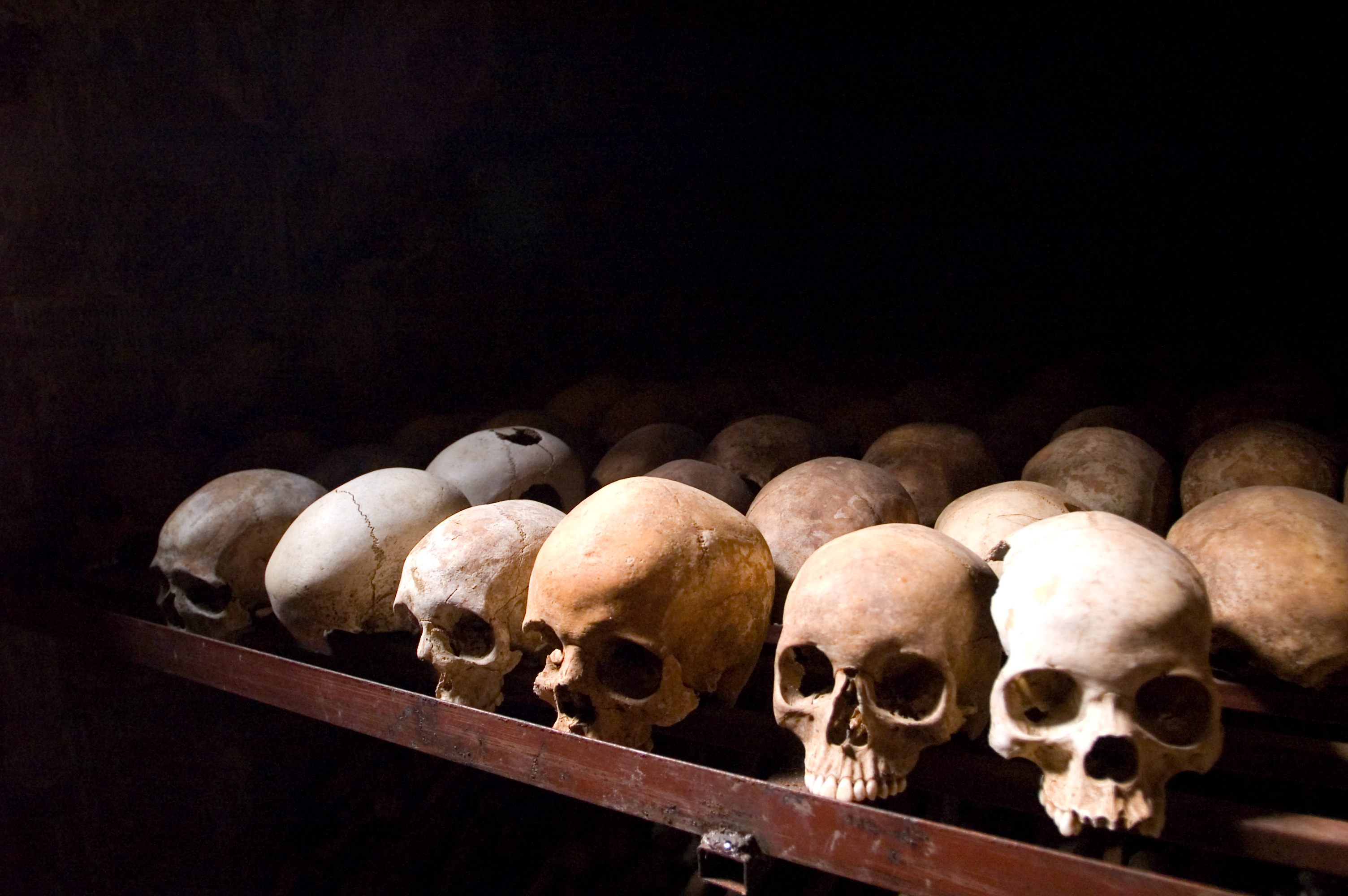
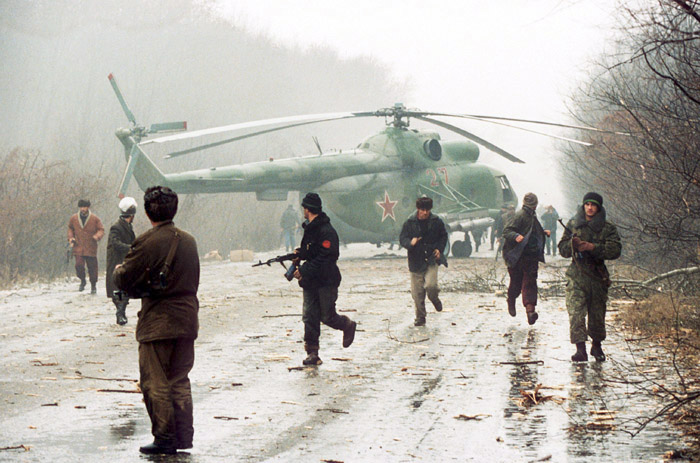
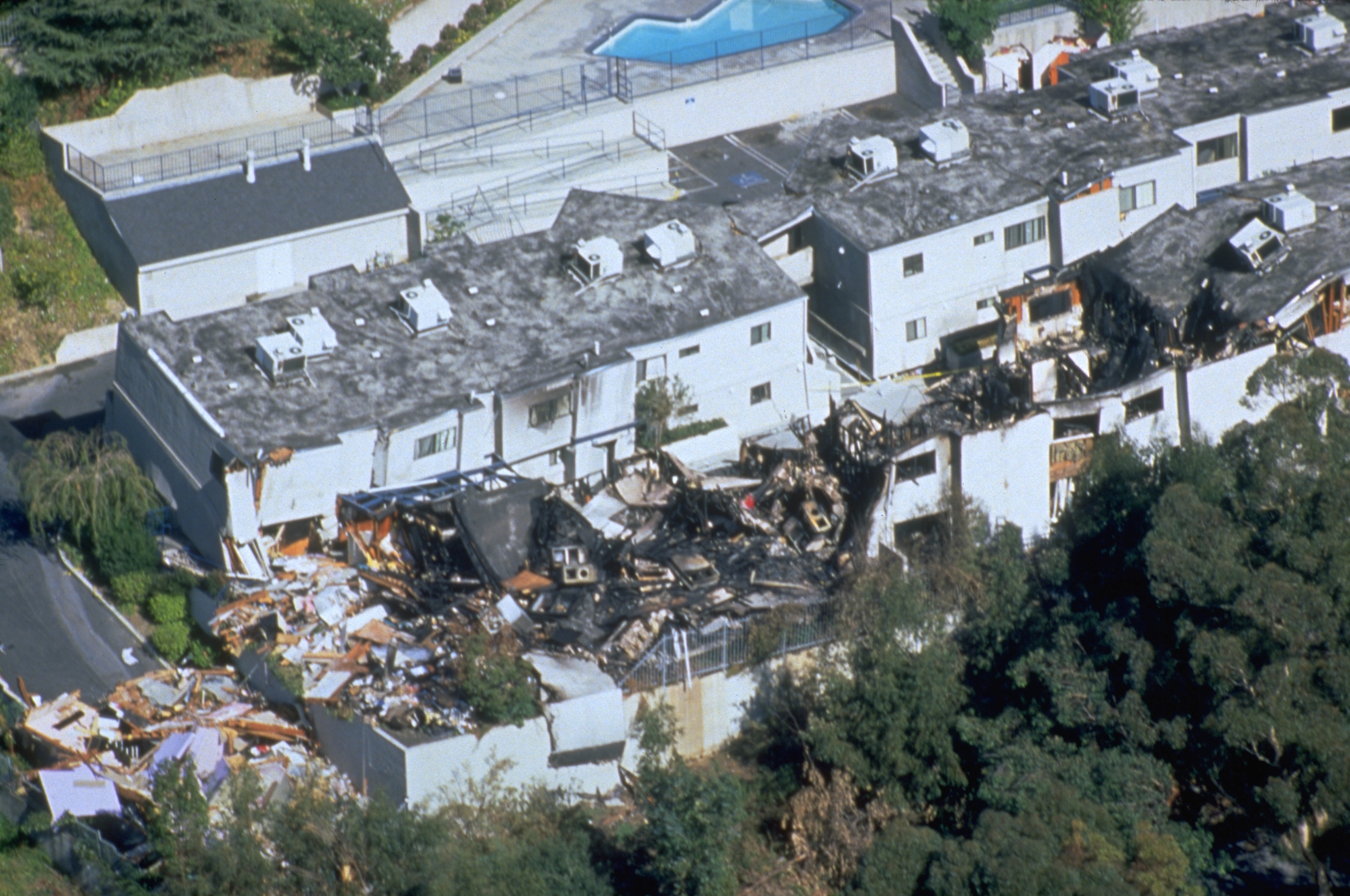
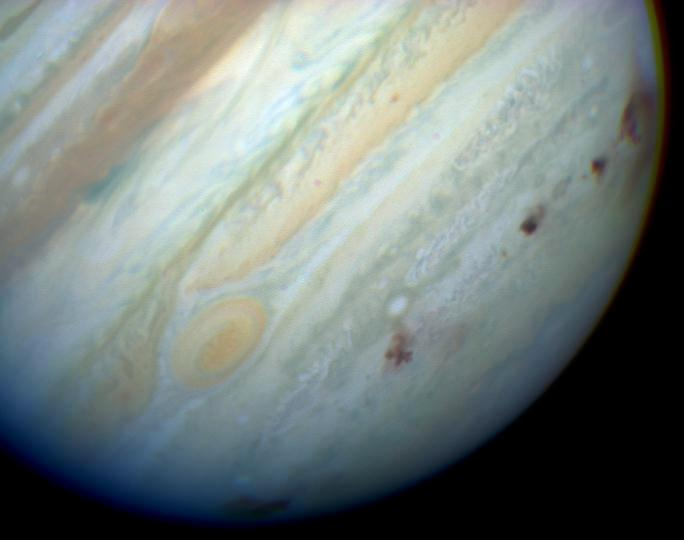
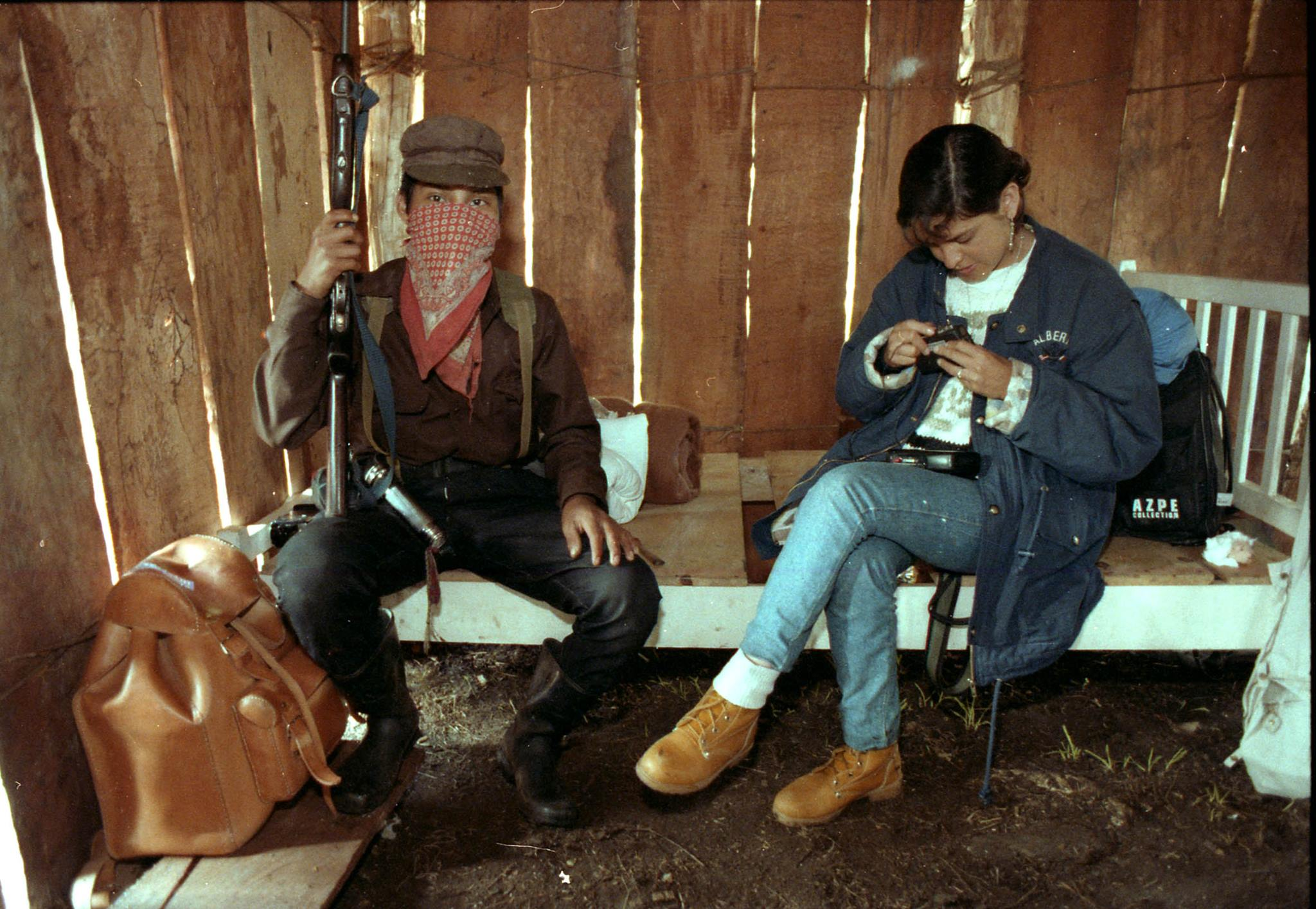
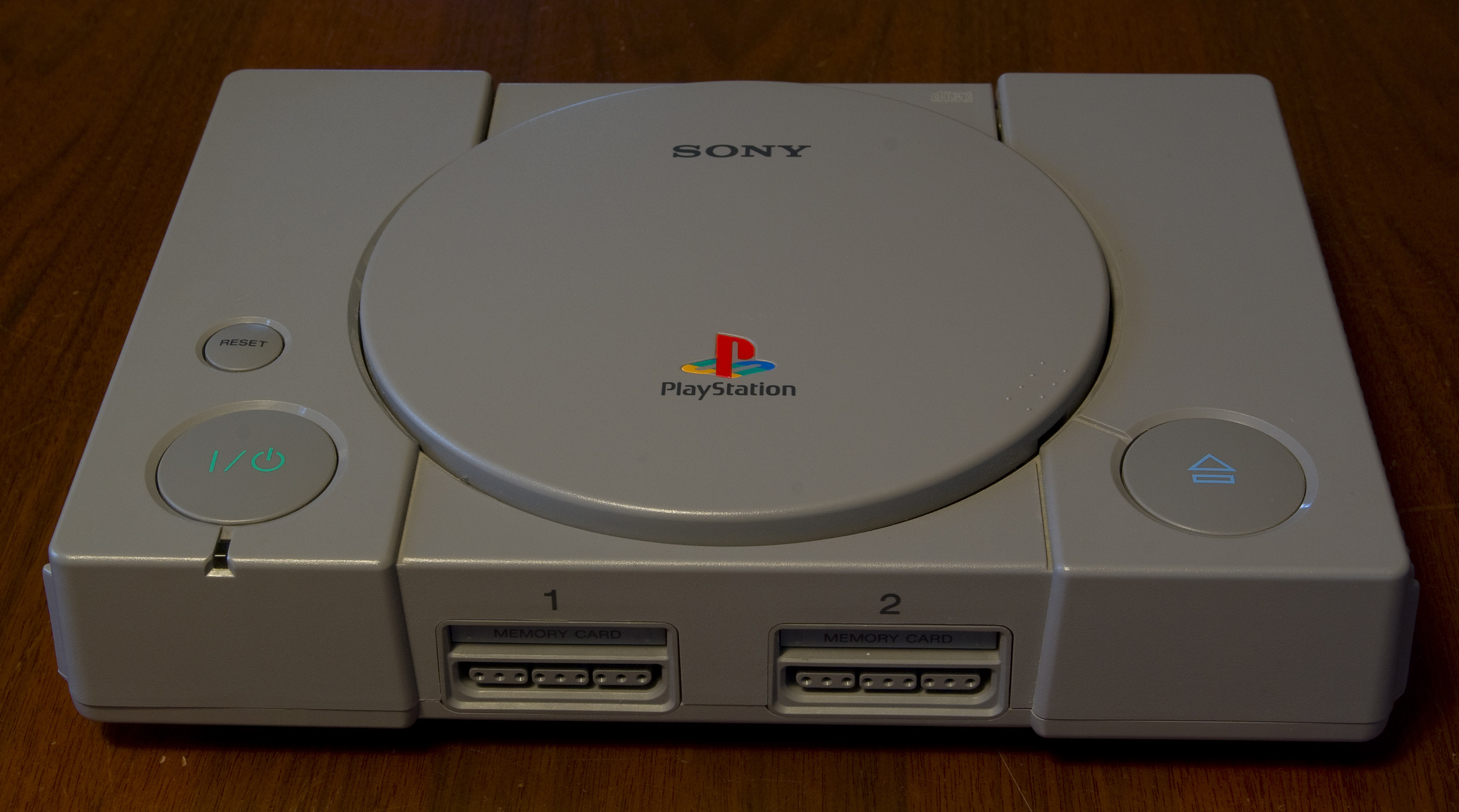
From top to bottom, left to right: Nelson Mandela is elected President of South Africa in the nation's first multiracial democratic elections; the 1994 FIFA World Cup is held in the United States and was won by Brazil; the 1994 Winter Olympics are held in Lillehammer, Norway; the Rwandan genocide unfolds over 100 days, resulting in the deaths of an estimated 800,000 Tutsi and Hutu; the First Chechen War begins as Russian forces invade Chechnya; the 1994 Northridge earthquake devastates Southern California, causing widespread destruction and killing dozens; Comet Shoemaker-Levy 9 breaks up and violently collides with Jupiter; the Zapatista uprising erupts in Chiapas, Mexico; and the Sony PlayStation is released in Japan.

1994 (MCMXCIV) was a common year starting on Saturday of the Gregorian calendar, the 1994th year of the Common Era (CE) and Anno Domini (AD) designations, the 994th year of the 2nd millennium, the 94th year of the 20th century, and the 5th year of the 1990s decade.

The year 1994 was designated as the "International Year of the Family" and the "International Year of Sport and the Olympic Ideal" by the United Nations.

In the Line Islands and Phoenix Islands of Kiribati, 1994 had only 364 days, omitting December 31. This was due to an adjustment of the International Date Line by the Kiribati government to bring all of its territories into the same calendar day.

== Events ==
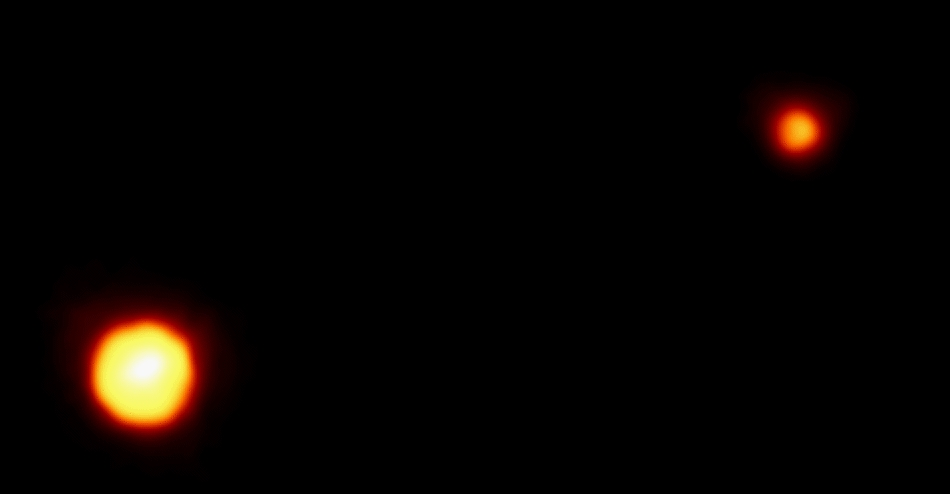
The February 1994 photo of Pluto and Charon from the Hubble Space Telescope.

=== January ===
- January 1
  - The North American Free Trade Agreement (NAFTA) is established.
  - Beginning of the Zapatista uprising in Mexico.
- January 8 – Soyuz TM-18: Valeri Polyakov begins his 437.7-day orbit of the Earth, eventually setting the world record for days spent in orbit.
- January 11 – The Irish government announces the end of a 15-year broadcasting ban on the Provisional Irish Republican Army and its political arm Sinn Féin.
- January 14 – U.S. president Bill Clinton and Russian president Boris Yeltsin sign the Kremlin accords, which stop the preprogrammed aiming of nuclear missiles toward each country's targets, and also provide for the dismantling of the nuclear arsenal in Ukraine.
- January 17 – The 6.7 M_{w} Northridge earthquake strikes the Greater Los Angeles Area of the United States, with a maximum Mercalli intensity of IX (Violent), leaving 57 people dead and more than 8,700 injured.

=== February ===
- February 3 – In the aftermath of the Chadian–Libyan conflict, the International Court of Justice rules that the Aouzou Strip belongs to the Republic of Chad.
- February 6 – Markale massacres: a Bosnian Serb Army mortar shell kills 68 civilians and wounds about 200 in a Sarajevo marketplace.
- February 9 – The Vance–Owen peace plan for Bosnia and Herzegovina is announced.
- February 12
  - Edvard Munch's painting The Scream is stolen in Oslo (it is recovered on May 7).
  - The 1994 Winter Olympics begin in Lillehammer.
- February 24 – In Gloucester, England, local police begin excavations at 25 Cromwell Street, the home of Fred West, a suspect in multiple murders. On February 28, he and his wife are arrested.
- February 25 – Israeli Kahanist Baruch Goldstein opens fire inside the Cave of the Patriarchs in the West Bank; he kills 29 Muslims before worshippers beat him to death.
- February 28 – Four United States F-16s shoot down four Serbian J-21s over Bosnia and Herzegovina for violation of the Operation Deny Flight and its no-fly zone.

=== March ===
- March – China gets its first connection to the Internet.
- March 6 – A referendum in Moldova results in the electorate voting against possible reunification with Romania.
- March 12 – The Church of England ordains its first female priests.
- March 20 – Italian journalist Ilaria Alpi and TV cameraman Miran Hrovatin are assassinated in Somalia.
- March 21 – The 66th Academy Awards, hosted by Whoopi Goldberg, are held at the Dorothy Chandler Pavilion in Los Angeles. Steven Spielberg's Holocaust drama Schindler's List wins seven Oscars including Best Picture and Best Director (Spielberg).
- March 23
  - Green Ramp disaster: two military aircraft collide over Pope Air Force Base, North Carolina, United States, causing 24 fatalities.
  - Mexican presidential candidate Luis Donaldo Colosio is assassinated at a campaign rally in Tijuana.
- March 27
  - TV tycoon Silvio Berlusconi's right-wing coalition wins the Italian general election.
  - The biggest tornado outbreak in 1994 occurs in the southeastern United States; one tornado kills 22 people at the Goshen United Methodist Church in Piedmont, Alabama.
- March 28 – Shell House massacre: Inkatha Freedom Party and ANC supporters battle in central Johannesburg, South Africa.
- March 31 – The journal Nature reports the finding in Ethiopia of the first complete Australopithecus afarensis skull.

=== April ===
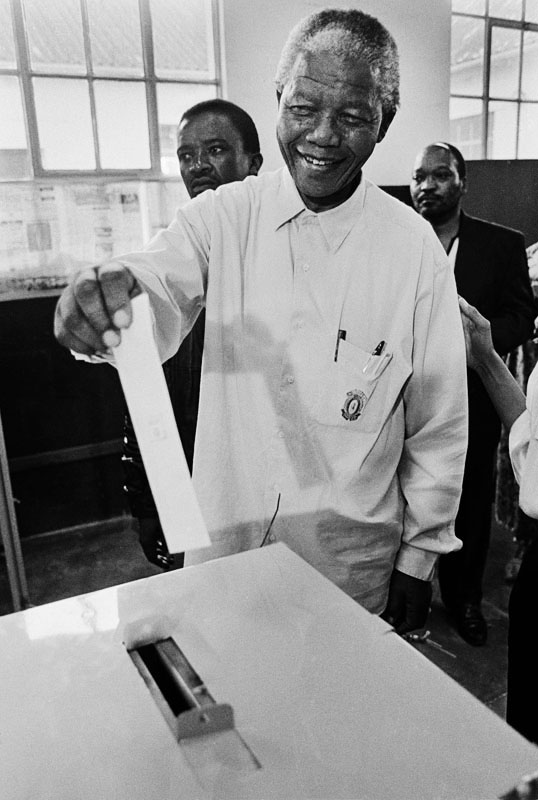
Nelson Mandela casts his vote in the 1994 South African general election

- April 2 – The National Convention of New Sudan of the SPLA/M opens in Chukudum.
- April 5 – Kurt Cobain, the lead singer of Nirvana commits suicide at the age of 27 at his home in Seattle. His body was found three days later.
- April 6 – Rwandan President Juvénal Habyarimana and Burundi President Cyprien Ntaryamira die when a missile shoots down their jet near Kigali, Rwanda. This is taken as a pretext to begin the Rwandan genocide.
- April 7 – The Rwandan genocide begins in Kigali, Rwanda.
- April 16 – Voters in Finland decide to join the European Union in a referendum.
- April 20 – South Africa adopts a new national flag, replacing the "Oranje, Blanje, Blou" flag adopted in 1928 that was used during apartheid.
- April 21 – The Red Cross estimates that hundreds of thousands of Tutsi have been killed in Rwanda.
- April 25 – Sultan Azlan Muhibbudin Shah ibni Almarhum Sultan Yusuff Izzudin Shah Ghafarullahu-lahu ends his term as the 9th Yang di-Pertuan Agong of Malaysia.
- April 26
  - Tuanku Jaafar ibni Almarhum Tuanku Abdul Rahman, Yang di-Pertuan Besar of Negeri Sembilan, becomes the 10th Yang di-Pertuan Agong of Malaysia.
  - China Airlines Flight 140, an Airbus A300, crashes while landing at Nagoya, Japan, killing 264 people.
- April 27 – South Africa holds its first fully multiracial elections, marking the final end of the last vestiges of apartheid. Nelson Mandela wins the elections and is sworn in as the first democratically elected president the following month.

=== May ===
- May 1 – Three-time Formula One world champion Ayrton Senna is killed in an accident during the San Marino Grand Prix in Imola, Italy.
- May 5 – The Bishkek Protocol between Armenia and Azerbaijan is signed in Bishkek, Kyrgyzstan, effectively freezing the Nagorno-Karabakh conflict.
- May 6 – The Channel Tunnel, which took 15,000 workers more than seven years to complete, officially opens between England and France; it will enable passengers to travel by rail between the two countries in 35 minutes.
- May 10 – Nelson Mandela is inaugurated as South Africa's first black president.
- May 17 – Malawi holds its first multiparty elections.
- May 18 – The Flavr Savr, a genetically modified tomato, is deemed safe for consumption by the FDA, becoming the first commercially grown genetically engineered food to be granted a license for human consumption.
- May 20 – After a funeral in Cluny Parish Church, Edinburgh attended by 900 people and after which 3,000 people line the streets, UK Labour Party leader John Smith is buried in a private family funeral on the island of Iona, at the sacred burial ground of Reilig Odhráin, which contains the graves of several Scottish kings as well as monarchs of Ireland, Norway and France.
- May 22 – Pope John Paul II issues the Apostolic Letter Ordinatio sacerdotalis from the Vatican, expounding the Catholic Church's position requiring "the reservation of priestly ordination to men alone".

=== June ===
- June 1 – The Republic of South Africa rejoins the Commonwealth of Nations after its first democratic election; South Africa had departed the then-British Commonwealth in 1961.
- June 6–8 – Ceasefire negotiations for the Yugoslav War begin in Geneva; they agree to a one-month cessation of hostilities (which does not last more than a few days).
- June 15 – Israel and the Vatican establish full diplomatic relations.
- June 17
  - NFL star O. J. Simpson and his friend Al Cowlings flee from police in a white Ford Bronco. The low-speed chase ends at Simpson's Los Angeles mansion, where he surrenders.
  - The 1994 FIFA World Cup starts in the United States.
- June 19 – Ernesto Samper is elected President of Colombia.
- June 23 – NASA's Space Station Processing Facility, a new state-of-the-art manufacturing building for the International Space Station, officially opens at Kennedy Space Center.
- June 25 – Cold War: the last Russian troops leave Germany.
- June 28 – Members of the Aum Shinrikyo cult execute the first sarin gas attack at Matsumoto, Japan, killing eight and injuring 200.
- June 30
  - The Liberal Democratic Party in Japan regains power after spending 11 months in opposition, in coalition with the Japan Socialist Party.
  - Tropical Storm Alberto forms, hitting parts of Florida causing $1.03 billion in damage and 32 deaths.

=== July ===
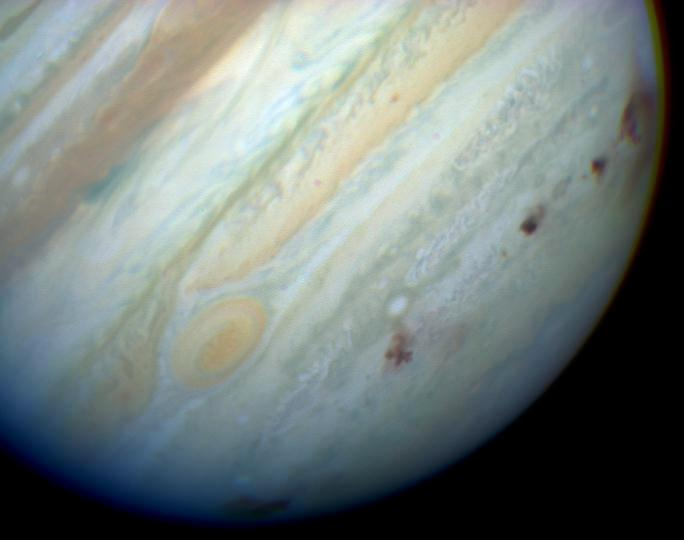
Brown spots mark impact sites of the Shoemaker–Levy Comet on Jupiter's southern hemisphere.

- July 4 – Rwandan Patriotic Front troops capture Kigali, a major breakthrough in the Rwandan Civil War.
- July 5 – Jeff Bezos founds Amazon.
- July 7 – 1994 civil war in Yemen: Aden is occupied by troops from North Yemen.
- July 8 – North Korean President Kim Il Sung dies, but officially continues to hold office.
- July 12 – The Allied occupation of Berlin officially ends with a casing of the colors ceremony attended by U.S. president Bill Clinton.
- July 16–22 – Fragments of Comet Shoemaker–Levy 9 impact the planet Jupiter.
- July 17 – Brazil wins the 1994 FIFA World Cup, defeating Italy 3–2 in a penalty shootout in the final (full-time 0–0).
- July 18
  - AMIA bombing: In Buenos Aires, a terrorist attack destroys a building housing several Jewish organizations, killing 85 and injuring many more.
  - Rwandan Patriotic Front troops capture Gisenyi, forcing the interim government into Zaire and ending the Rwandan genocide.
- July 25 – Israel and Jordan sign the Washington Declaration as a preliminary to signature on October 25 of the Israel–Jordan peace treaty, which formally ends the state of war that has existed between the nations since 1948.

=== August ===
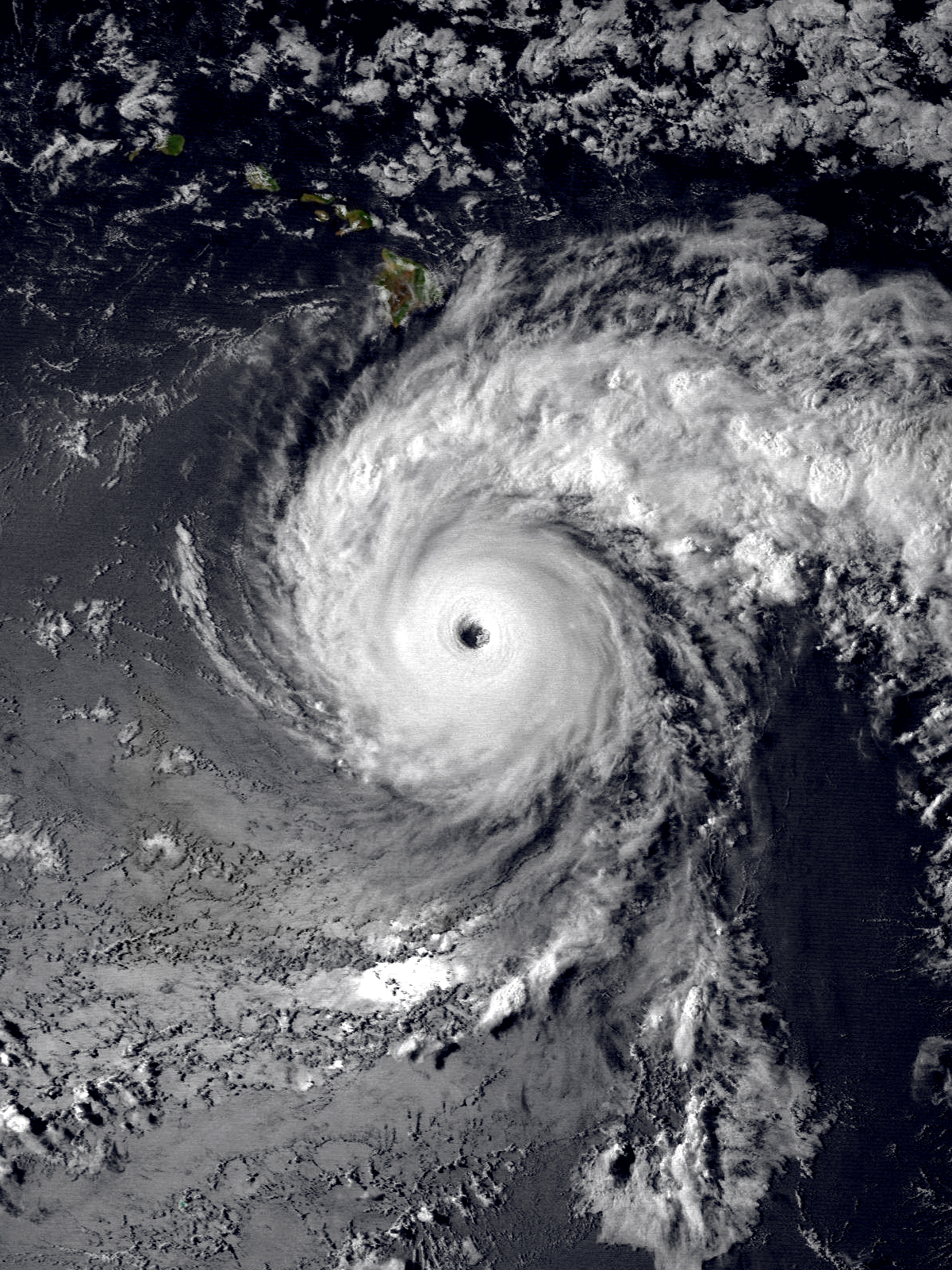
Hurricane John near peak intensity to the south of Hawaii on August 23

- August 5 – Maleconazo: Groups of protesters spread from Havana, Cuba's Castillo de la Punta ("Point Castle"), creating the first protests against Fidel Castro's government since 1959.
- August 12 – Woodstock '94 begins in Saugerties, New York, United States, marking the 25-year anniversary of Woodstock in 1969.
- August 18
  - 1994 Mascara earthquake: a 5.8 earthquake leaves 171 dead in Algeria.
  - Liebeck v. McDonald's Restaurants: a 12-person jury reaches its verdict to award Stella Liebeck $2,860,000 in compensatory and punitive damages, later reduced to $640,000, for burns she received from a spilled hot coffee. McDonald's and Liebeck will later settle out of court.
- August 20 – Tyke, a female African bush elephant, injures her groomer and kills her trainer at the Neal S. Blaisdell Center in Honolulu, Hawaii. She then escapes the arena, and runs amok in the streets for half an hour, before police officers shoot her 86 times. She eventually collapses from her wounds and dies.
- August 31
  - The Troubles: The Provisional Irish Republican Army announces a "complete cessation of military operations" as part of the Northern Ireland peace process. This will temporarily end in 1996 with the Docklands bombing in England before a definite ceasefire in 1997. In 1998, the Good Friday Agreement is signed and the IRA decommissions its weapons in 2005
  - The Russian Army leaves Estonia and Latvia, ending the last traces of Eastern Europe's Soviet occupation.
  - Argentine president Carlos Menem signs a decree abolishing conscription in Argentina following months of social outrage after the murder of Omar Carrasco, a 20-year-old conscript. The abolition takes effect in 1995.
- c. August – Pizza Hut becomes the first restaurant to offer online food ordering, in California.

=== September ===
- September 3 – Cold War: Russia and the China agree to de-target their nuclear weapons against each other.
- September 5 – New South Wales State MP for Cabramatta John Newman is shot outside his home, in Australia's first political assassination since 1977.
- September 8 – USAir Flight 427, a Boeing 737 with 132 people on board, crashes on approach to Pittsburgh International Airport killing all on board.
- September 13 – President Bill Clinton signs the Federal Assault Weapons Ban, which bans the manufacture of new firearms with certain features for a period of 10 years.
- September 14 – The 1994 World Series in baseball is officially cancelled due to the ongoing work stoppage. It is the first time a World Series will not be played since 1904.
- September 16
  - Danish tour guide Louise Jensen is abducted, raped and murdered by three British soldiers in Cyprus.
  - Britain lifts the broadcasting ban imposed on Sinn Féin and paramilitary groups from Northern Ireland.
- September 19 – Operation Uphold Democracy: U.S. troops stage a bloodless invasion of Haiti to restore the legitimately elected leader, Jean-Bertrand Aristide, to power.
- September 28
  - The car ferry MS Estonia sinks in the Baltic Sea, killing 852 people.
  - José Francisco Ruiz Massieu, Mexican politician, is assassinated on orders of Raúl Salinas de Gortari.
- September–October – Iraq disarmament crisis: Iraq threatens to stop cooperating with UNSCOM inspectors and begins to once again deploy troops near its border with Kuwait. In response, the U.S. begins to deploy troops to Kuwait.

=== October ===
- October 1
  - In Slovakia, populist leader Vladimír Mečiar wins the general election.
  - Palau gains independence from the United Nations Trusteeship Council.
- October 5 – The day after five members of the Order of the Solar Temple were found dead in Morin-Heights, Quebec, Canada, Swiss police find 48 members of the cult dead, in what was found to be a mass murder-suicide.
- October 15
  - After three years of U.S. exile, Haiti's president Aristide returns to his country.
  - Iraq disarmament crisis: following threats by the U.N. Security Council and the U.S., Iraq withdraws troops from its border with Kuwait.
- October 16 – Robbery on the Bank of the Republic: In the Colombian city of Valledupar, a branch of the Colombian central bank Banco de la Republica (Bank of the Republic) is robbed of COP$24,075 million of non emitted bills (some US$33 million); this comes to be known as "El Robo del Siglo" (the bank heist of the century).

=== November ===
- November 5
  - A letter by former U.S. president Ronald Reagan, announcing that he has Alzheimer's disease, is released.
  - American boxer George Foreman wins the WBA and IBF World Heavyweight Championships by KO'ing Michael Moorer becoming the oldest heavyweight champion in history.
  - Influential Afrikaner theologian and critic of apartheid Johan Heyns is assassinated; the killers are never apprehended or identified.
- November 6
  - A flood in Piedmont, Italy, kills dozens of people.
  - Bražuolė bridge bombing in Lithuania damages a railway bridge but trains are stopped in time to avoid casualties.
- November 7 – WXYC, the student radio station of the University of North Carolina at Chapel Hill, provides the world's first internet radio broadcast.
- November 8
  - "Republican Revolution": Georgia Representative Newt Gingrich leads the United States Republican Party in taking control of both the House of Representatives and the Senate in midterm congressional elections, the first time in 40 years the Republicans secure control of both houses of Congress. George W. Bush is elected Governor of Texas.
  - Hurricane Gordon hits Central America, Jamaica, Cuba, the Bahamas, Haiti and the Southeastern United States, causing $594 million in damages and 1,152 fatalities.
- November 11
  - Duy Tan University, Vietnam's University, is established.
  - Iraq formally rescinds its claims over Kuwait, which it has claimed as a province since 1990 and had administered under military occupation until 1991 when it was ejected by an international coalition during the Persian Gulf War.
- November 13 – Voters in Sweden decide to join the European Union in a referendum.
- November 14 – The first Eurostar train passengers travel through the Channel Tunnel.
- November 15
  - 1994 Nepalese general election The CPN (UML) is elected with a minority government, becoming the first democratically elected Communist party in Asia.
  - 1994 Mindoro earthquake A 7.1 earthquake hits the central Philippine island of Mindoro, killing 78 people, injuring 430 and triggering a tsunami up to 8.5 m (28 ft) high.
- November 16 – United Nations Convention on the Law of the Sea {1982) comes fully into effect on receiving 60 signatures.
- November 20 – The Angolan government and UNITA rebels sign the Lusaka Protocol.
- November 27 – A Fuxin Yiyuan dance hall catches fire in Liaoning Province, China, killing 233 persons, with another 71 rescued, according to a confirmed Chinese government official report.
- November 28 – Voters in Norway decide not to join the European Union in a referendum.

=== December ===
- December 1 – Ernesto Zedillo takes office as President of Mexico.
- December 2 – The Australian government agrees to pay reparations to indigenous Australians who were displaced during the nuclear tests at Maralinga in the 1950s and 1960s.
- December 3
  - Sony releases the PlayStation video game system in Japan; it will sell over 100 million units worldwide by the time it is discontinued in 2006.
  - Taiwan holds its first full local elections: James Soong is elected as the first and only directly elected Governor of Taiwan; Chen Shui-bian becomes the first direct elected Mayor of Taipei; Wu Den-yih becomes the first directly elected Mayor of Kaohsiung.
- December 11 – Russian president Boris Yeltsin orders troops into Chechnya.
- December 13
  - The trial of former president Mengistu begins in Ethiopia.
  - Fred West, 53, a builder living in Gloucester, England, is remanded in custody, charged with murdering 12 people (including two of his own daughters) whose bodies are mostly found buried at his house in Cromwell Street. His wife Rosemary West, 41, is charged with 10 murders.
- December 14 – Construction commences on the Three Gorges Dam, at Sandouping, China.
- December 19
  - A planned exchange rate correction of the Mexican peso to the US dollar, becomes a massive financial meltdown in Mexico, unleashing the 'Tequila' effect on global financial markets. This prompts a US$50 billion "bailout" by the Clinton administration.
  - Civil unions between same-sex couples are legalized in Sweden.
- December 31 – This date is skipped by the Phoenix Islands to switch from the UTC−11 time zone to UTC+13, and by the Line Islands to switch from UTC−10 to UTC+14. The latter becomes the earliest time zone in the world, one full day ahead of Hawaii.

== Births ==
=== January ===
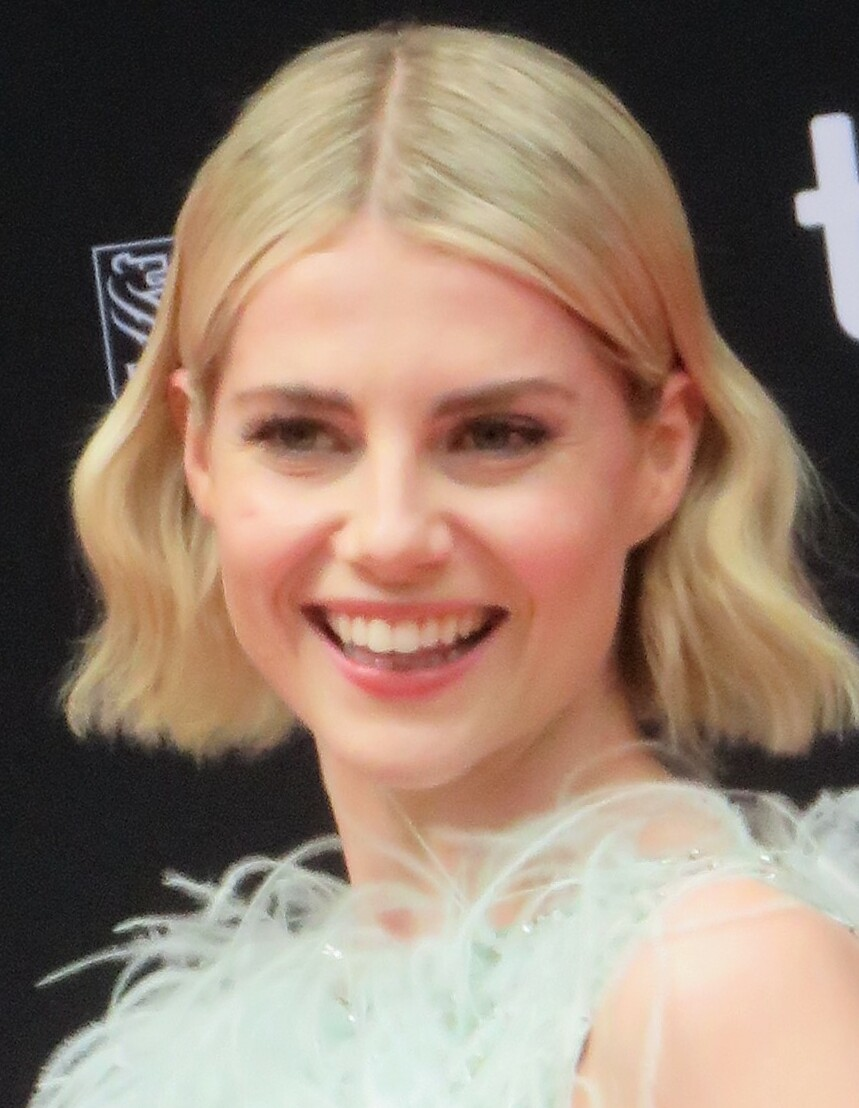
Lucy Boynton

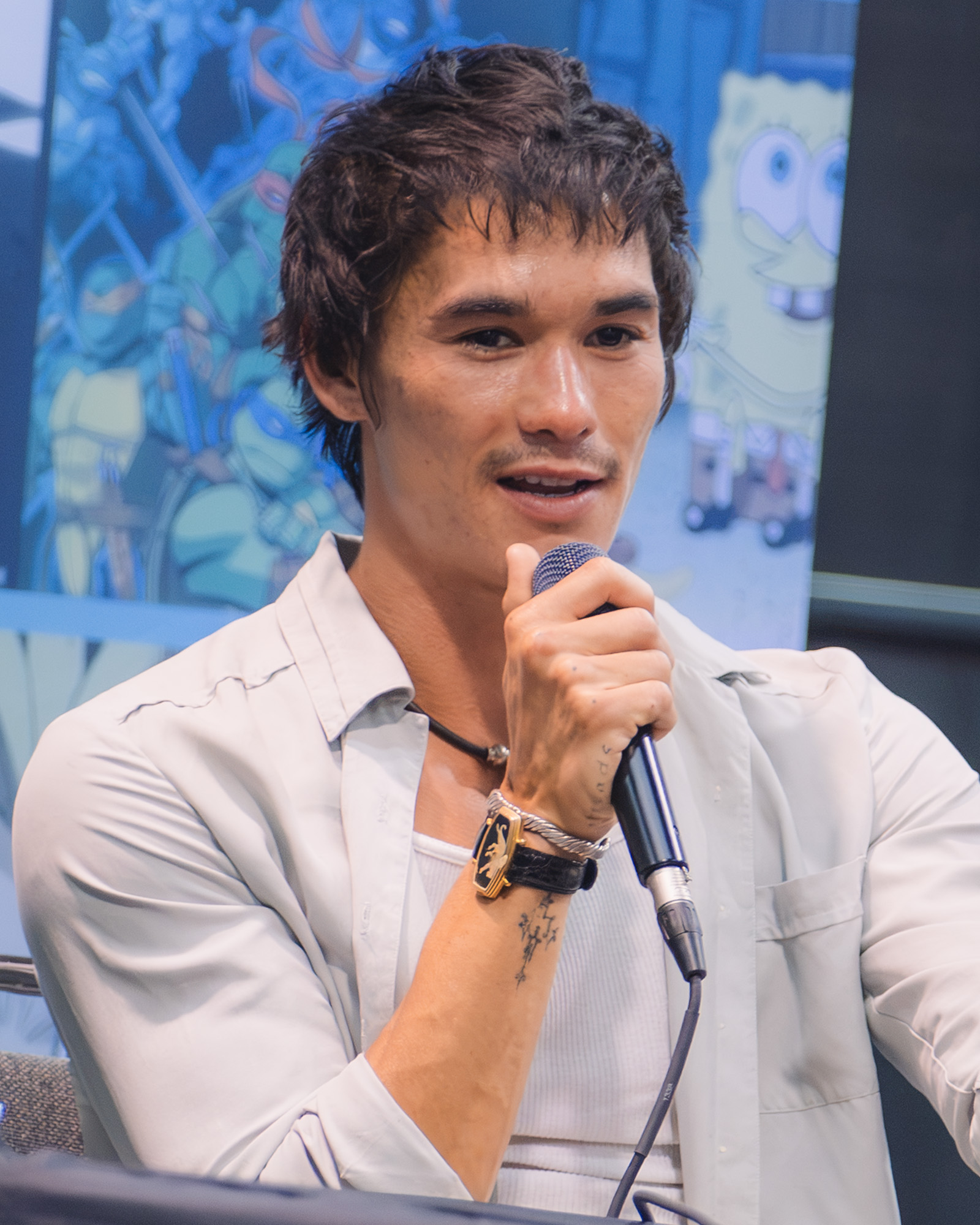
Booboo Stewart

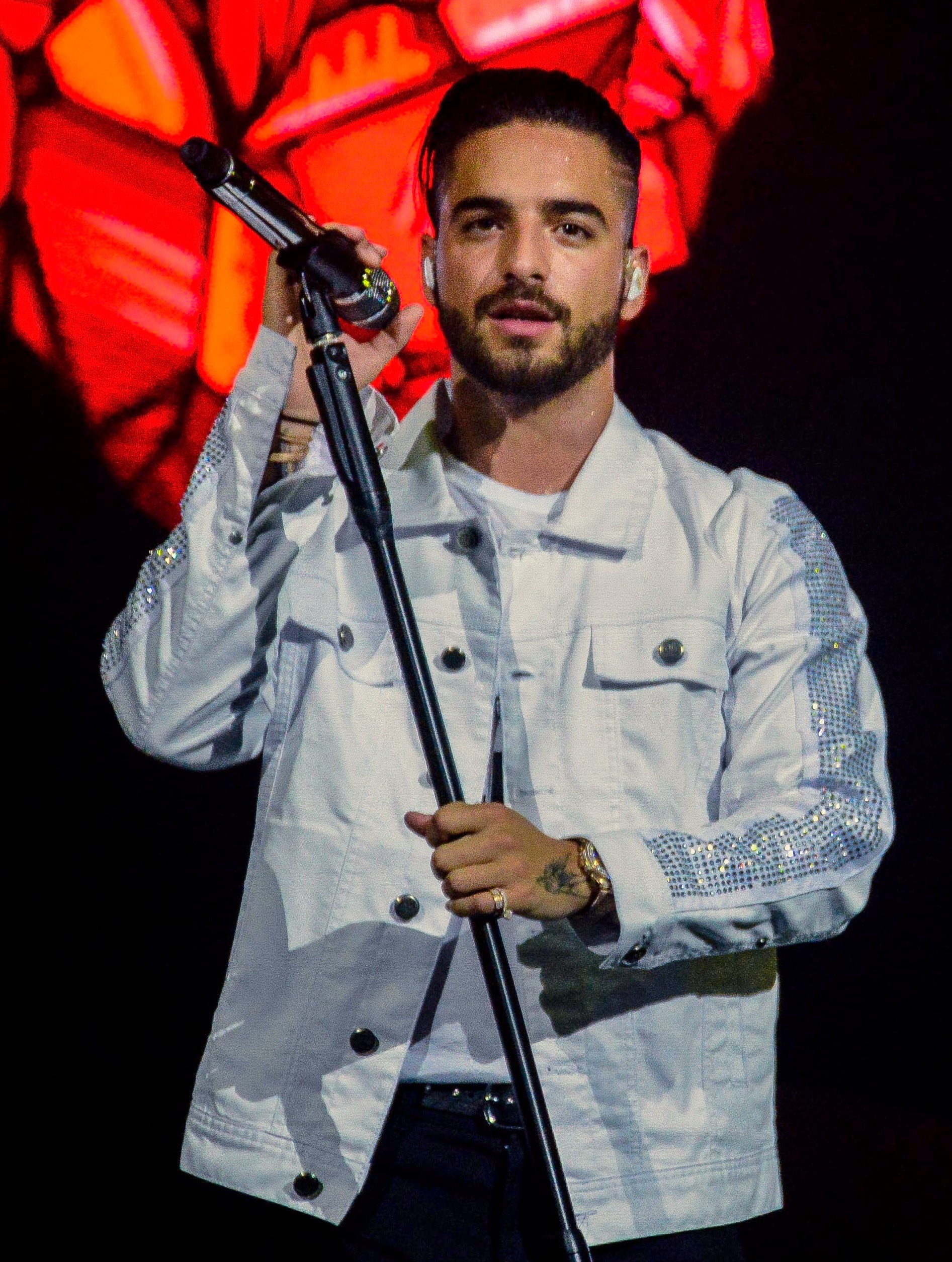
Maluma

- January 1 – Emilie Hegh Arntzen, Norwegian handball player
- January 3 – Isaquias Queiroz, Brazilian sprint canoeist
- January 4 – Viktor Axelsen, Danish badminton player
- January 5 – Zemgus Girgensons, Latvian ice hockey player
- January 7 – Lee Sun-bin, South Korean actress and singer
- January 10 – Faith Kipyegon, Kenyan middle-distance runner
- January 11 – Desirae Krawczyk, American tennis player
- January 12 – Emre Can, German footballer
- January 14
  - Muktar Edris, Ethiopian long-distance runner
  - Kai, South Korean singer
- January 18
  - Minzy, South Korean singer, rapper and dancer
  - Jiyoung, South Korean singer and actress
- January 19 – Matthias Ginter, German footballer
- January 21 – Booboo Stewart, American actor
- January 28 – Maluma, Colombian singer

=== February ===
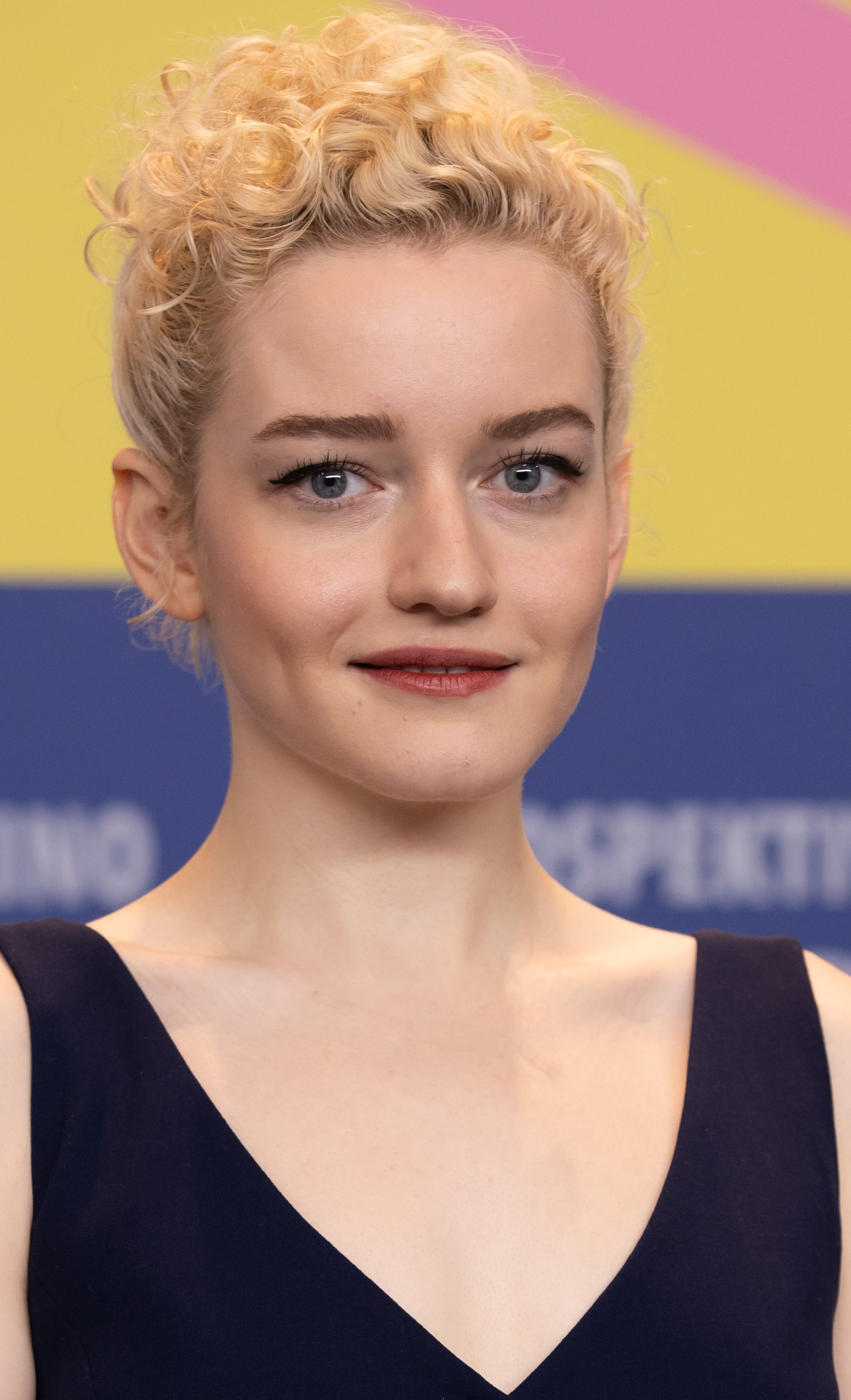
Julia Garner

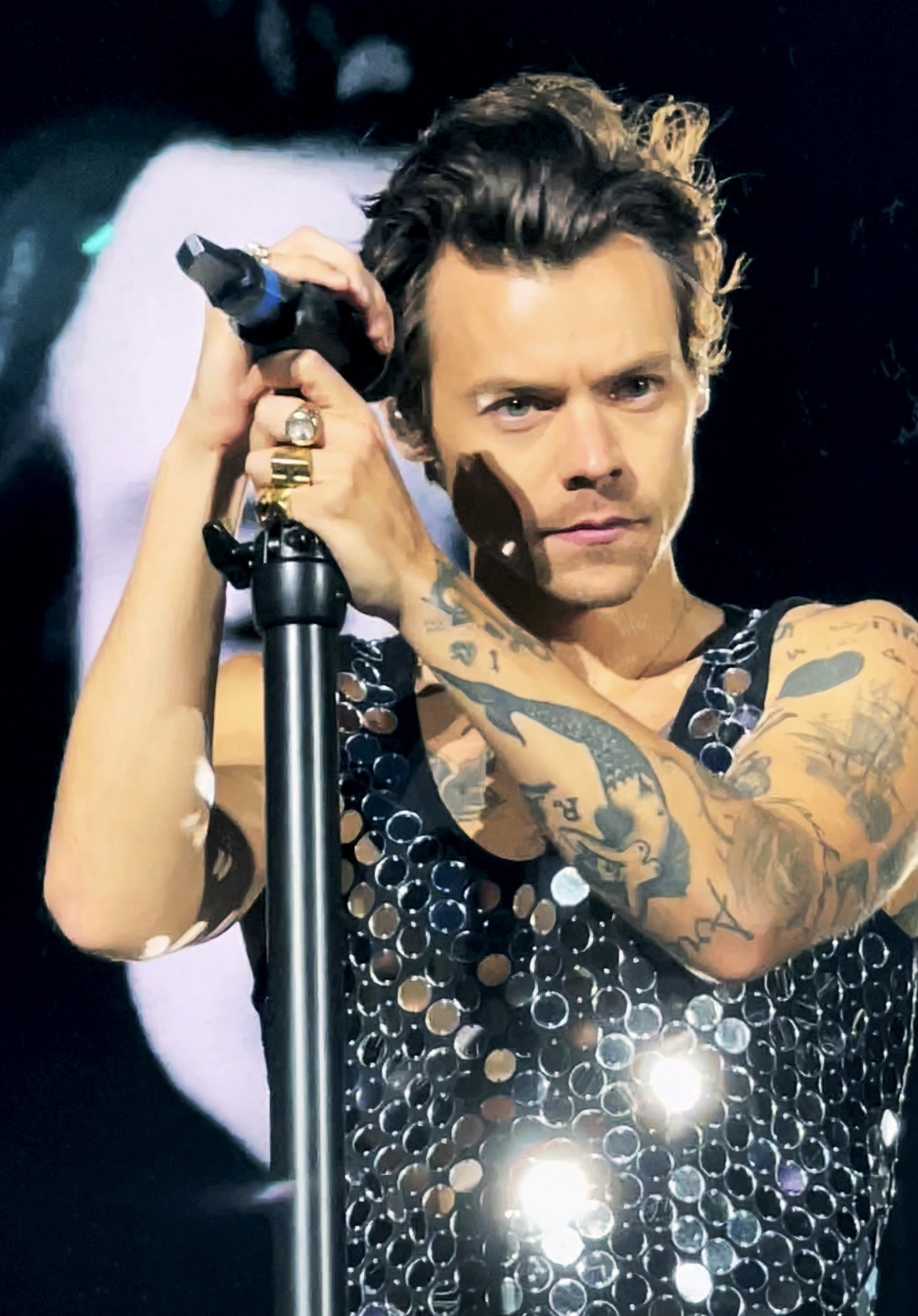
Harry Styles

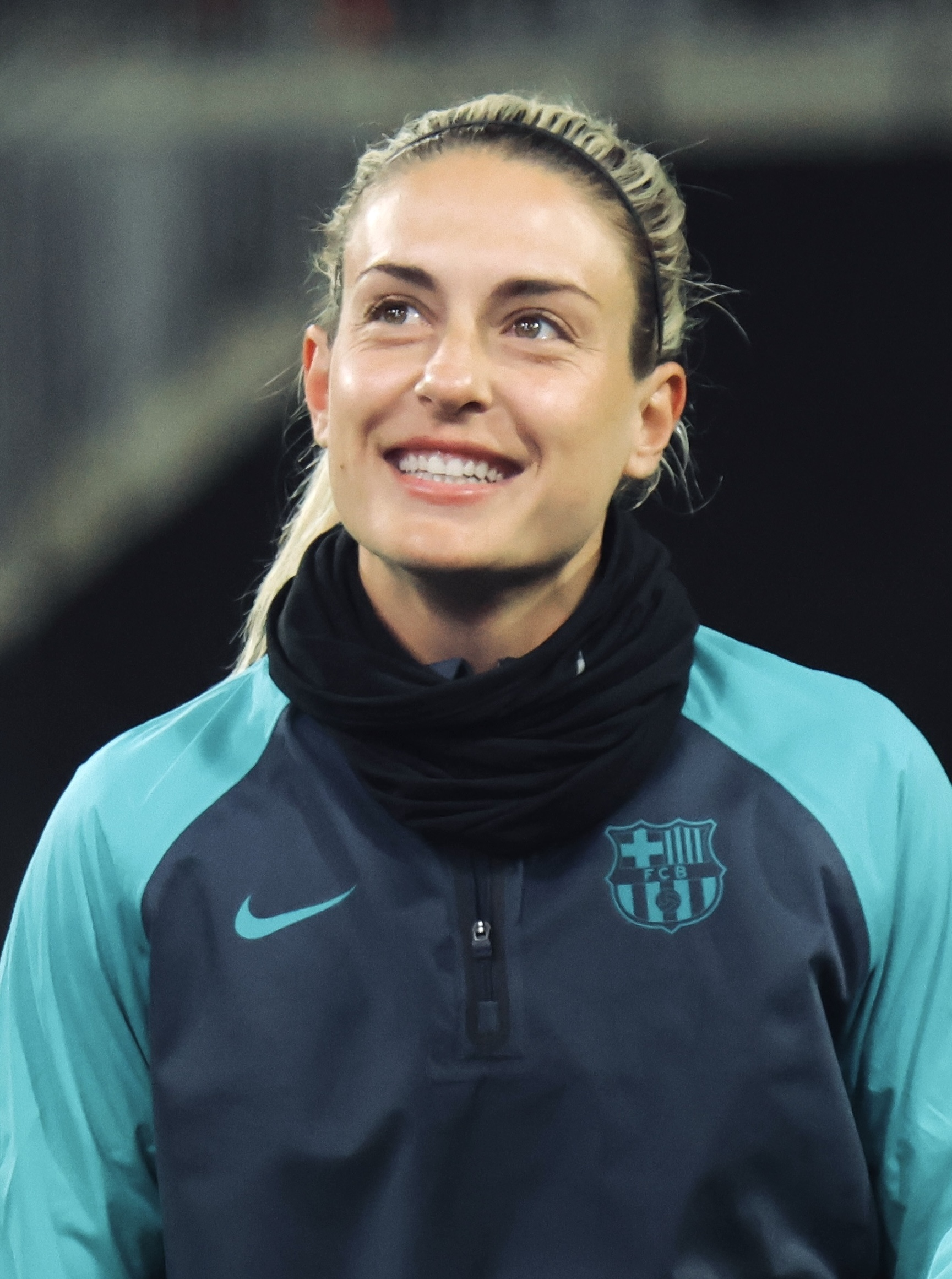
Alexia Putellas

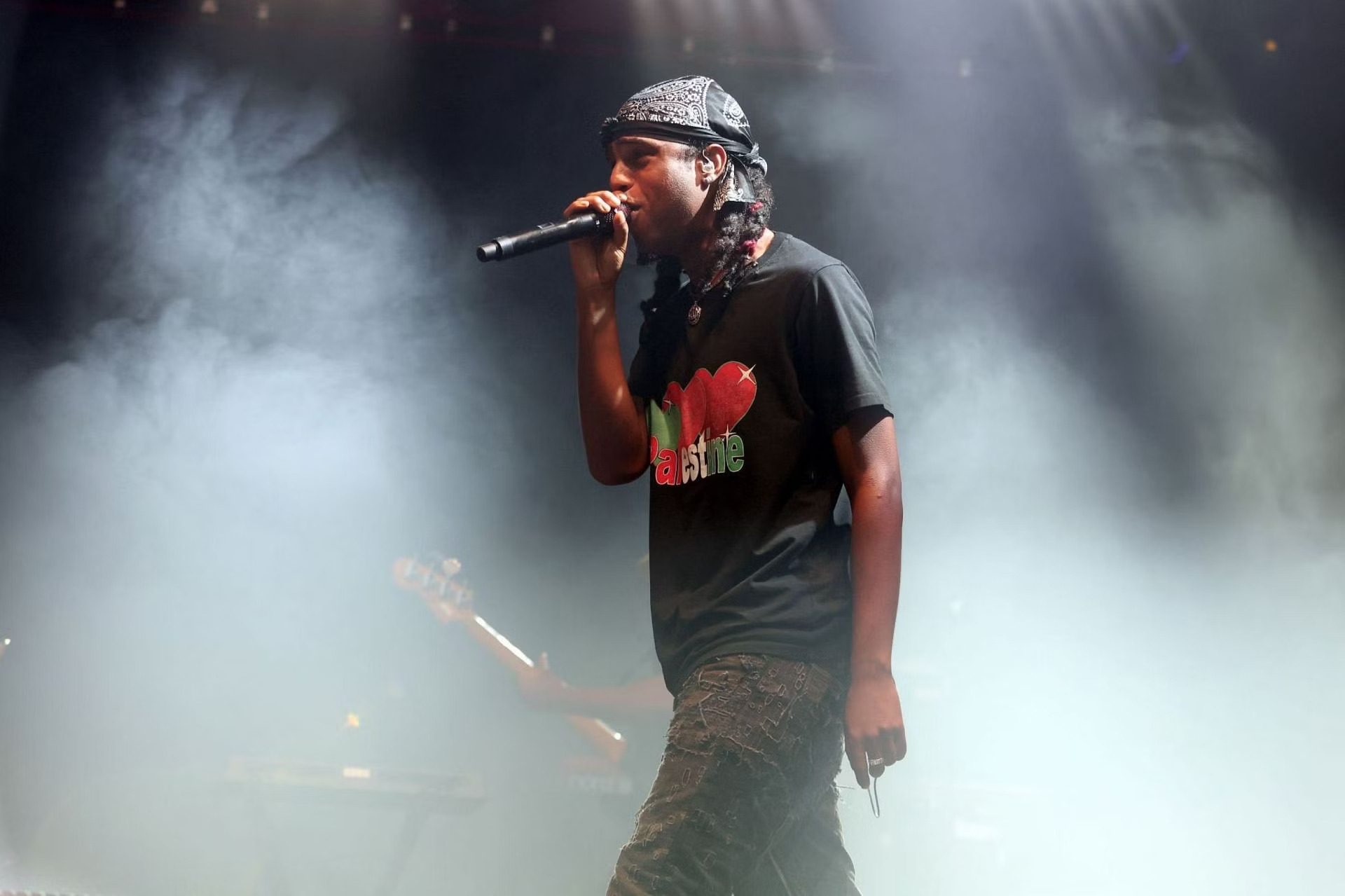
Bakar

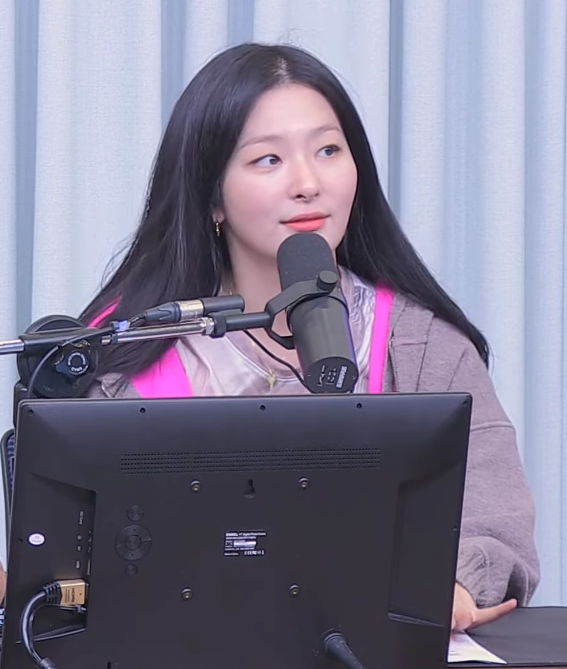
Seulgi

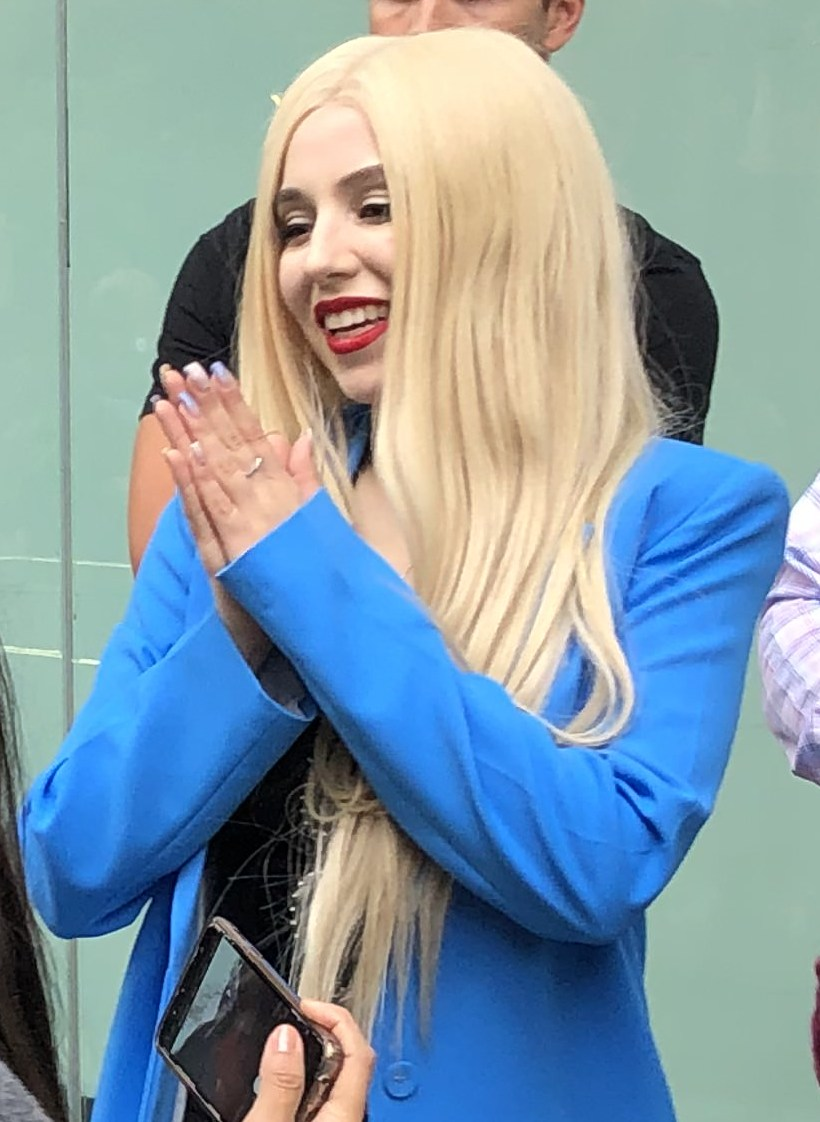
Ava Max

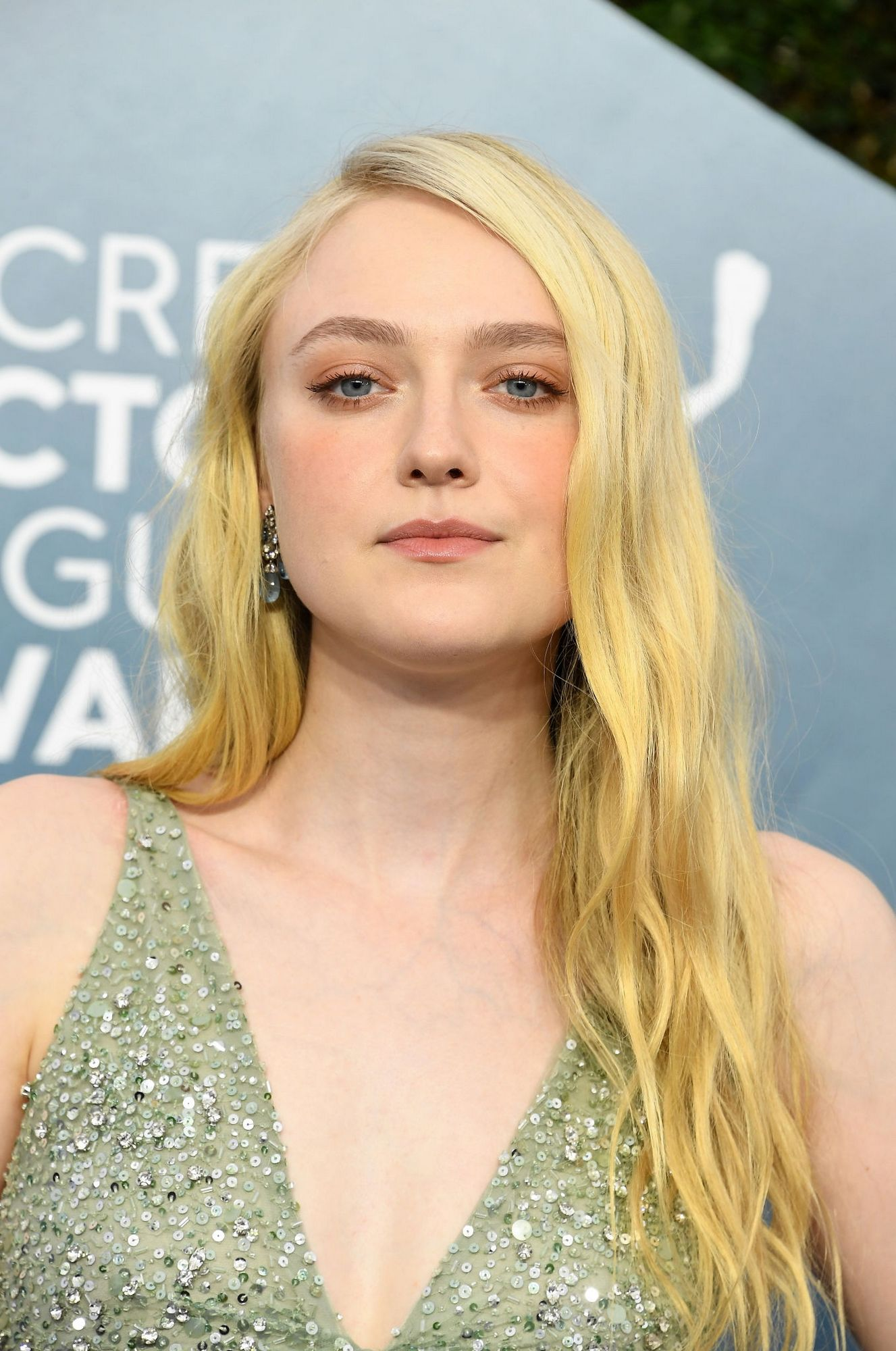
Dakota Fanning

- February 1
  - Julia Garner, American actress
  - Luke Saville, Australian tennis player
  - Harry Styles, English singer
- February 3 – Malaika Mihambo, German athlete
- February 4 – Alexia Putellas, Spanish footballer
- February 8 – Hakan Çalhanoğlu, Turkish footballer
- February 12
  - Arman Hall, American sprinter
  - Bakar, British musician
- February 13 – Memphis Depay, Dutch footballer
- February 14
  - Becky Hill, British singer
  - Petchmorakot Petchyindee Academy, Thai Muay Thai kickboxer and former ONE Featherweight Muay Thai World Champion
- February 16
  - Federico Bernardeschi, Italian footballer
  - Ava Max, American singer
- February 18
  - J-Hope, South Korean rapper and songwriter
  - Gabriela Schloesser, Mexican born-Dutch archer
- February 20 – Brigid Kosgei, Kenyan marathon runner
- February 21 – Wendy, South Korean singer
- February 23
  - Dakota Fanning, American actress and fashion model
  - Lucas Pouille, French tennis player
- February 24 – Jessica Pegula, American tennis player
- February 25 – Eugenie Bouchard, Canadian tennis player
- February 26 – Mahra Al Maktoum, Emirati princess.
- February 27 – Hou Yifan, Chinese chess player
- February 28 – Arkadiusz Milik, Polish footballer

=== March ===
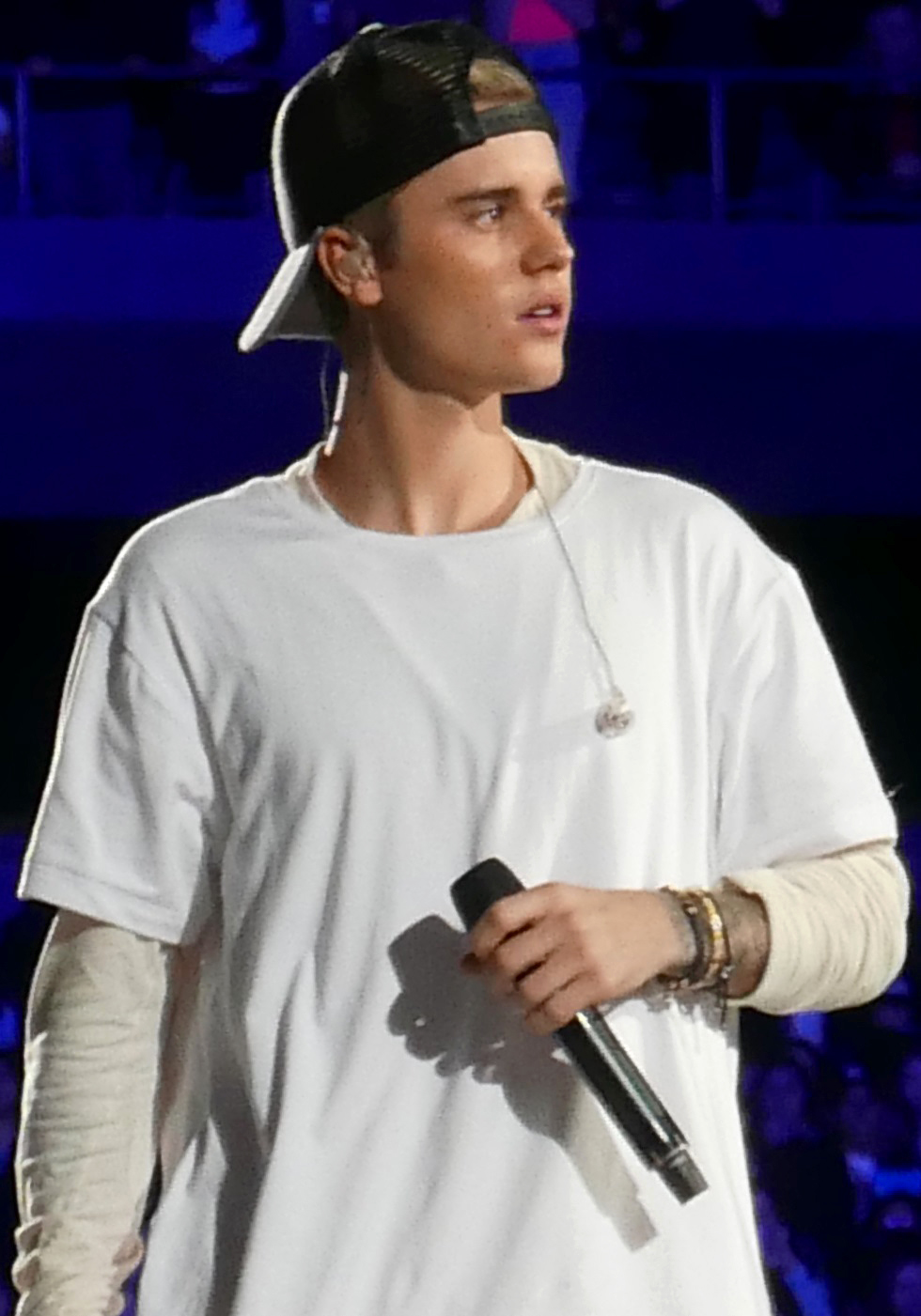
Justin Bieber

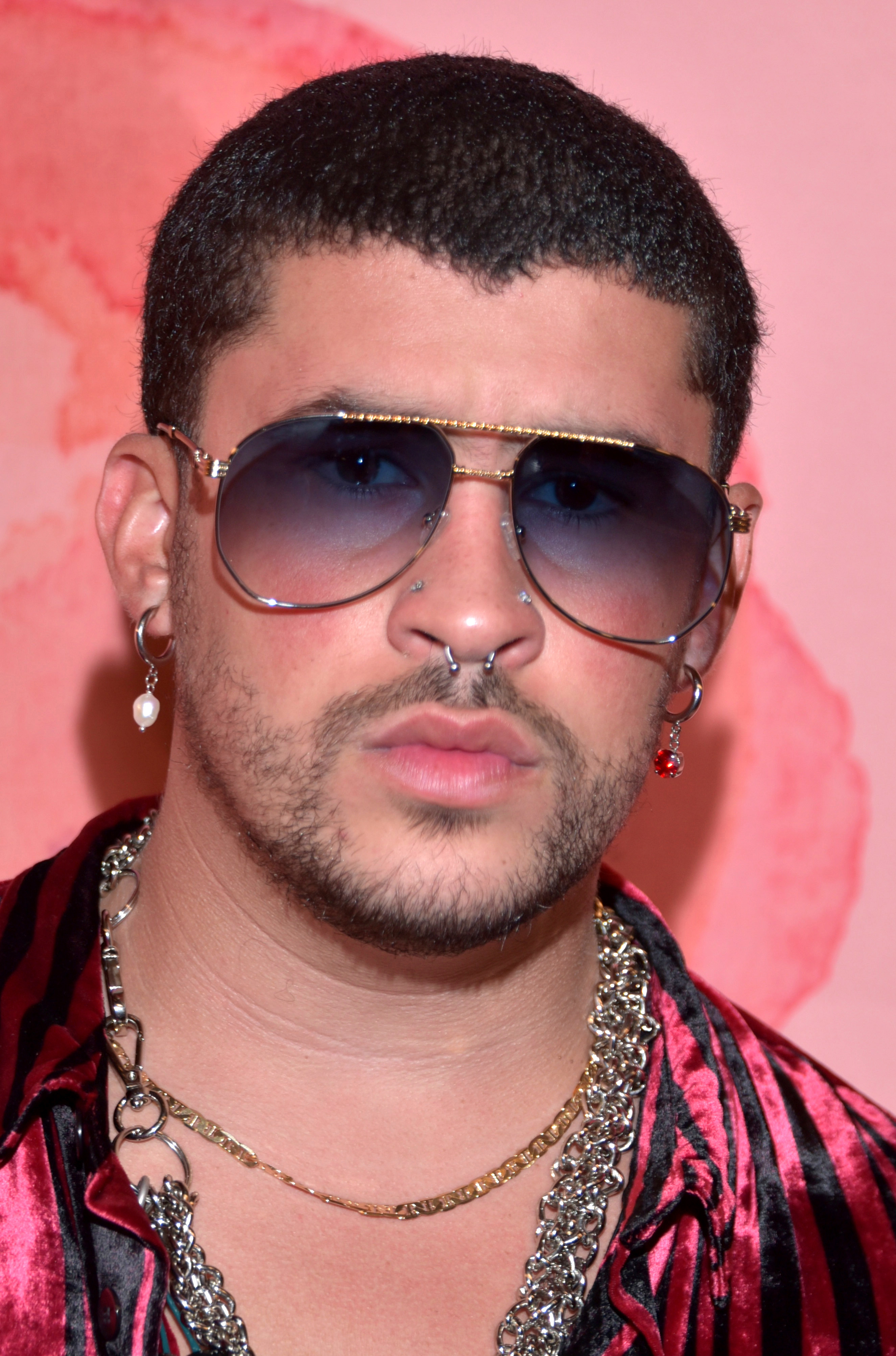
Bad Bunny

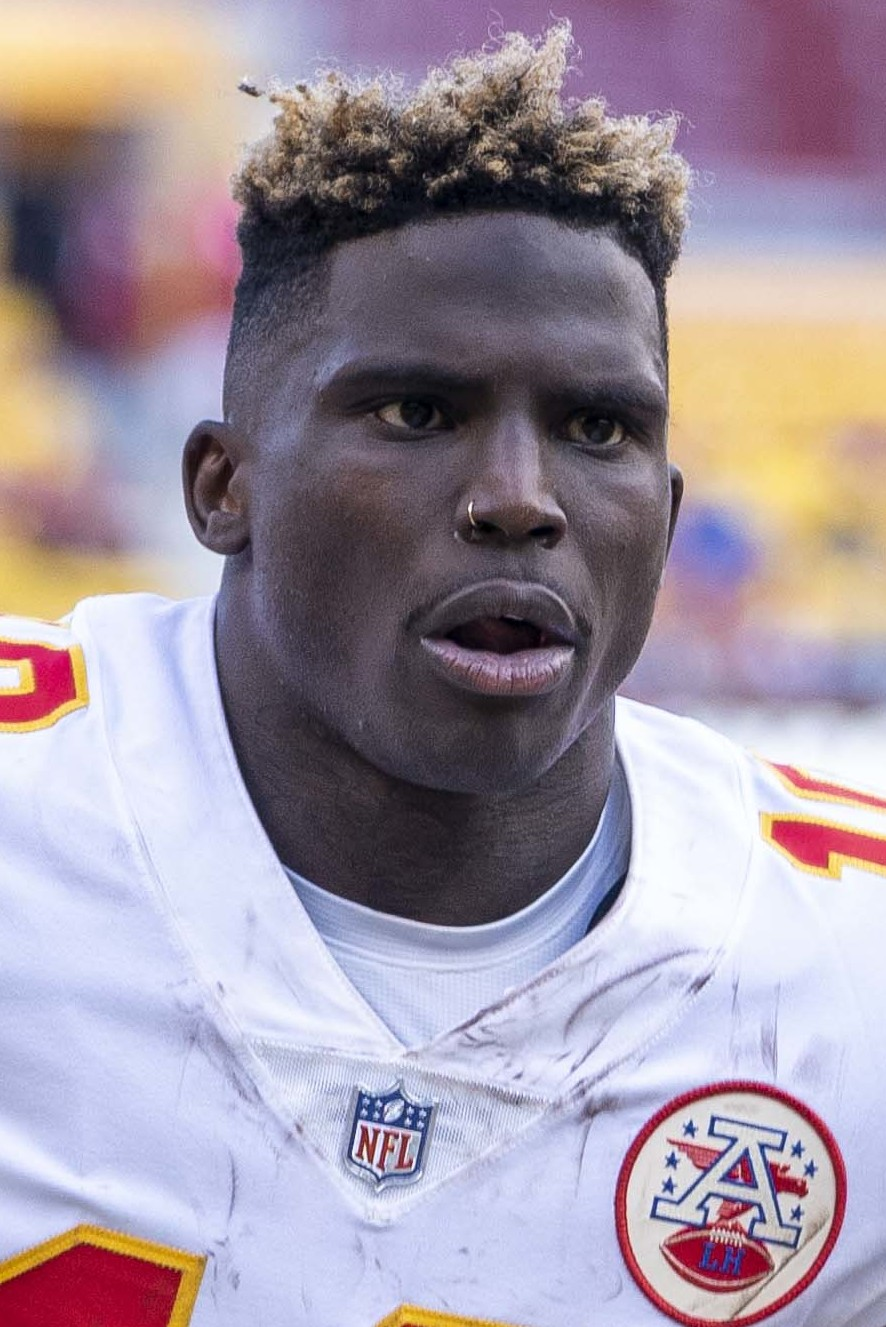
Tyreek Hill

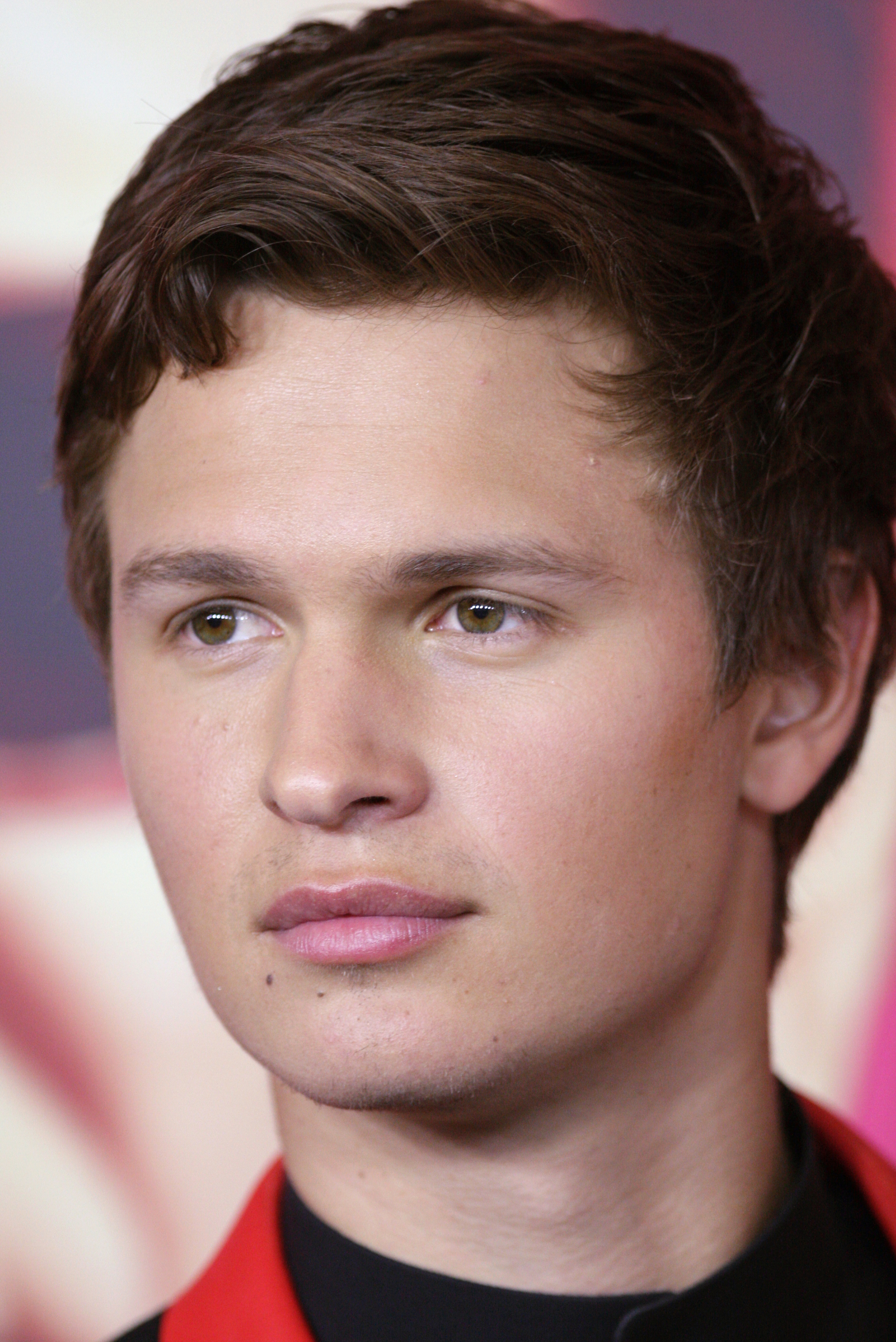
Ansel Elgort

- March 1 – Justin Bieber, Canadian singer
- March 10
  - Bad Bunny, Puerto Rican singer
  - Nikita Parris, English footballer
- March 11 − Andy Robertson, Scottish footballer
- March 12
  - Katie Archibald, Scottish track cyclist
  - Christina Grimmie, American singer (murdered. 2016)
- March 14 – Ansel Elgort, American actor, singer, and DJ
- March 15 – Georgia Taylor-Brown, British triathlete
- March 16 – Joel Embiid, Cameroonian basketball player
- March 22 – Douglas Santos, Brazilian footballer
- March 23 – Bridger Zadina American actor
- March 24 – Giulia Steingruber, Swiss artistic gymnast
- March 26 – Mayu Watanabe, Japanese singer
- March 29 – Sulli, South Korean singer, songwriter, actress and model (d. 2019)
- March 30 – Jetro Willems, Dutch footballer

=== April ===
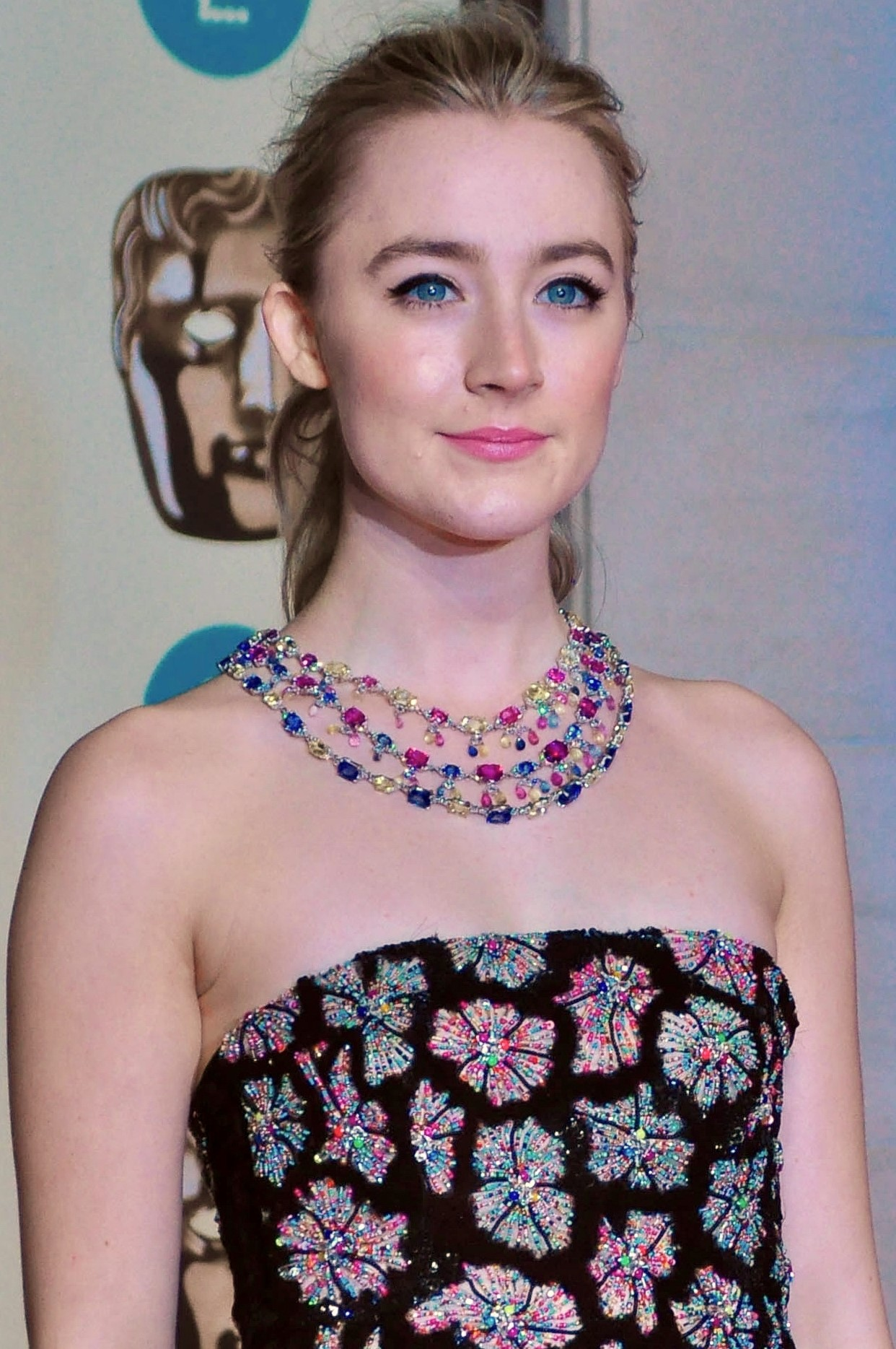
Saoirse Ronan

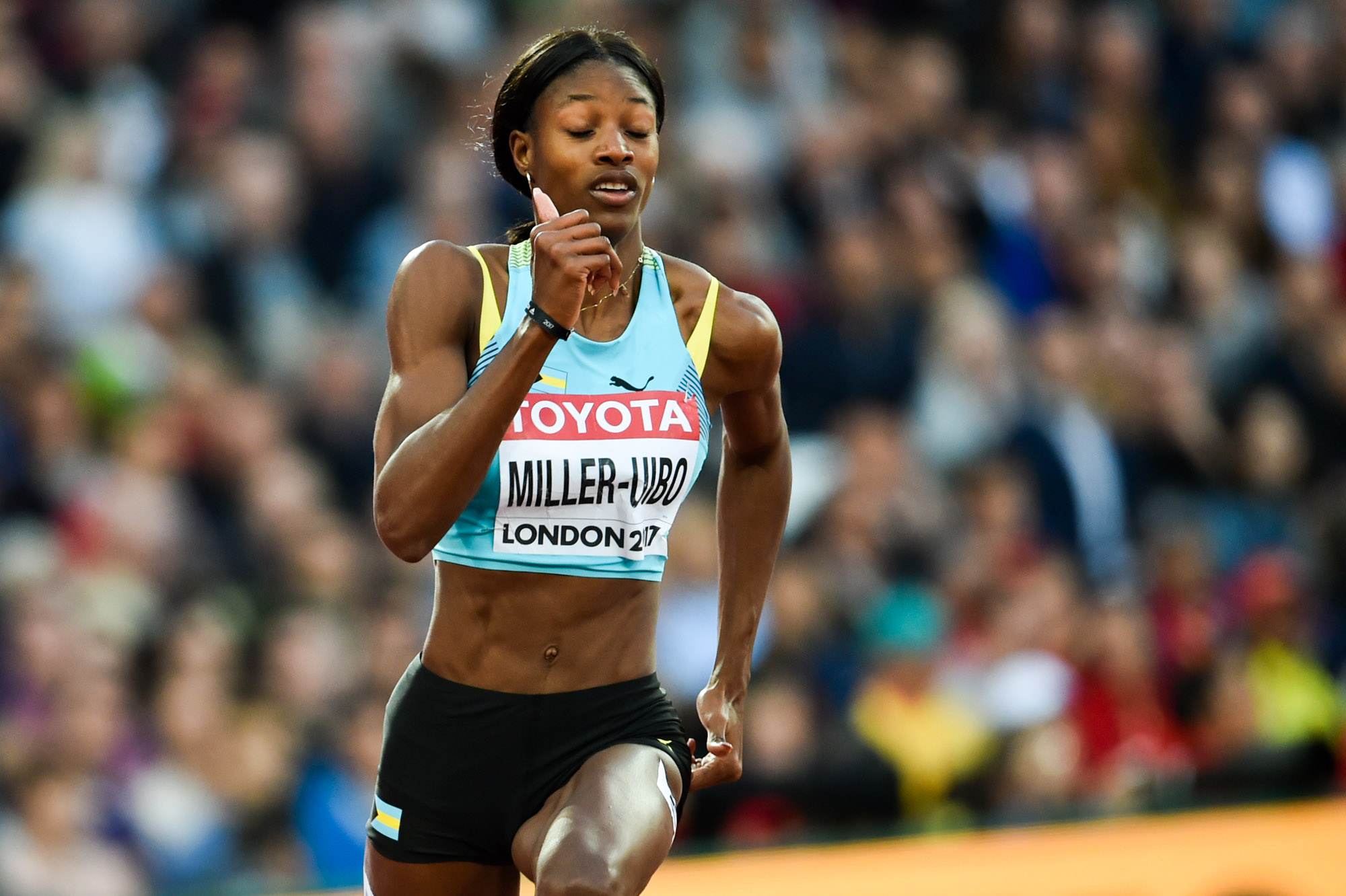
Shaunae Miller-Uibo

- April 3
  - Feng Bin, Chinese discus thrower
  - Srbuk, Armenian singer
- April 9 – Rosamaria Montibeller, Brazilian volleyball player
- April 11
  - Duncan Laurence, Dutch singer
  - Dakota Blue Richards, English actress
- April 12
  - Eric Bailly, Ivorian footballer
  - Oh Se-hun, South Korean singer
  - Saoirse Ronan, United States-born Irish actress
- April 14 – Pauline Ranvier, French fencer
- April 20 – Alexander Massialas, American fencer
- April 21 – Gulnaz Khatuntseva, Russian cyclist
- April 22 – Maria Verschoor, Dutch field hockey player
- April 24 – Bruna Moura, Brazilian cross-country skier
- April 25 – Omar McLeod, Jamaican hurdler

=== May ===
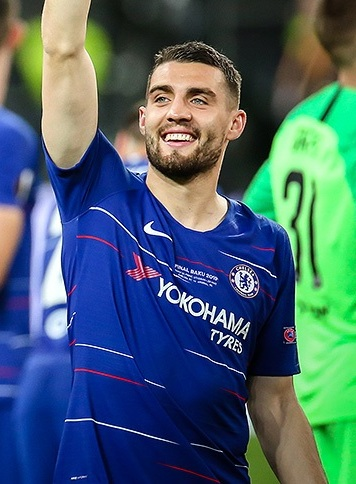
Mateo Kovačić

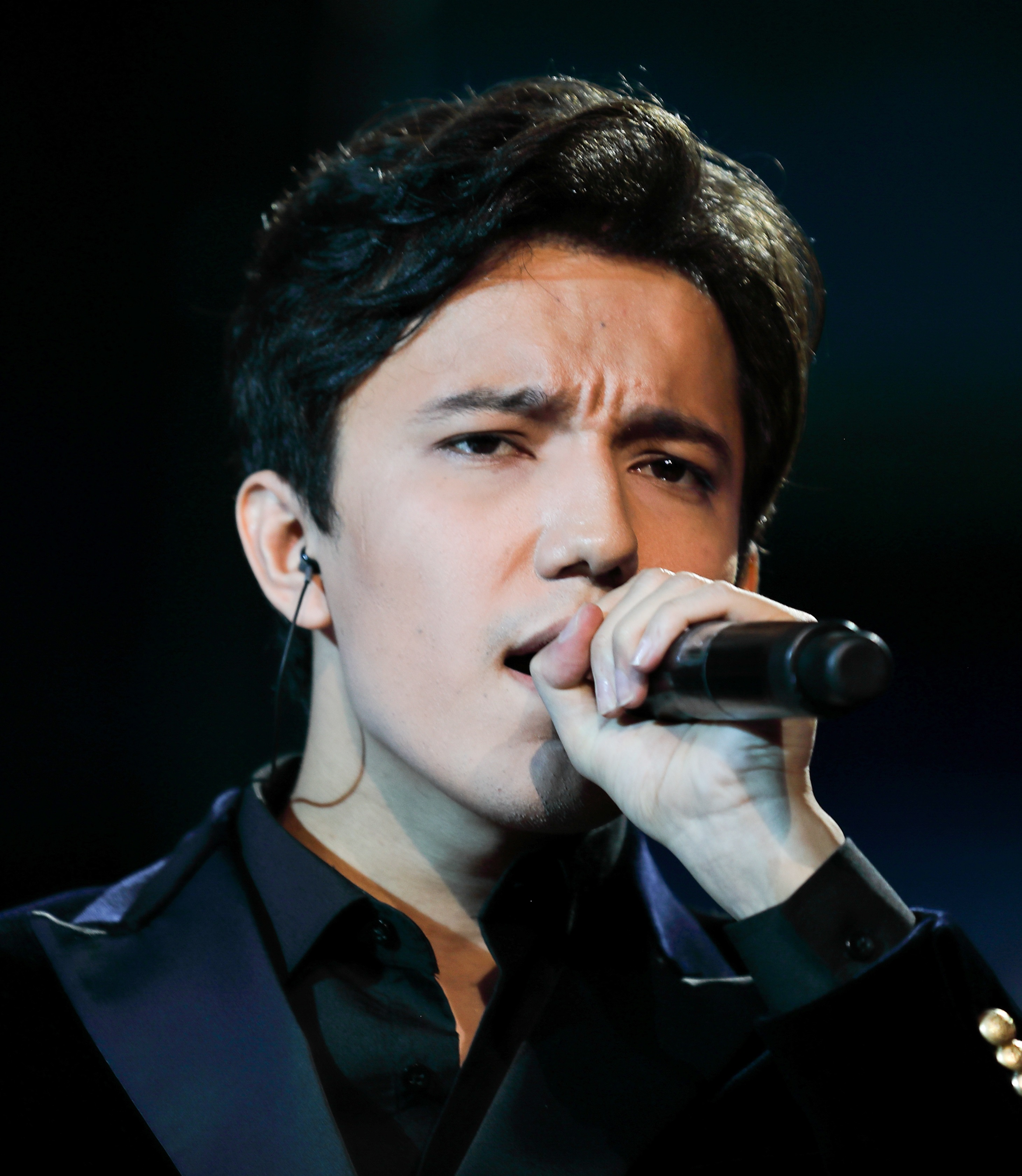
Dimash Kudaibergen

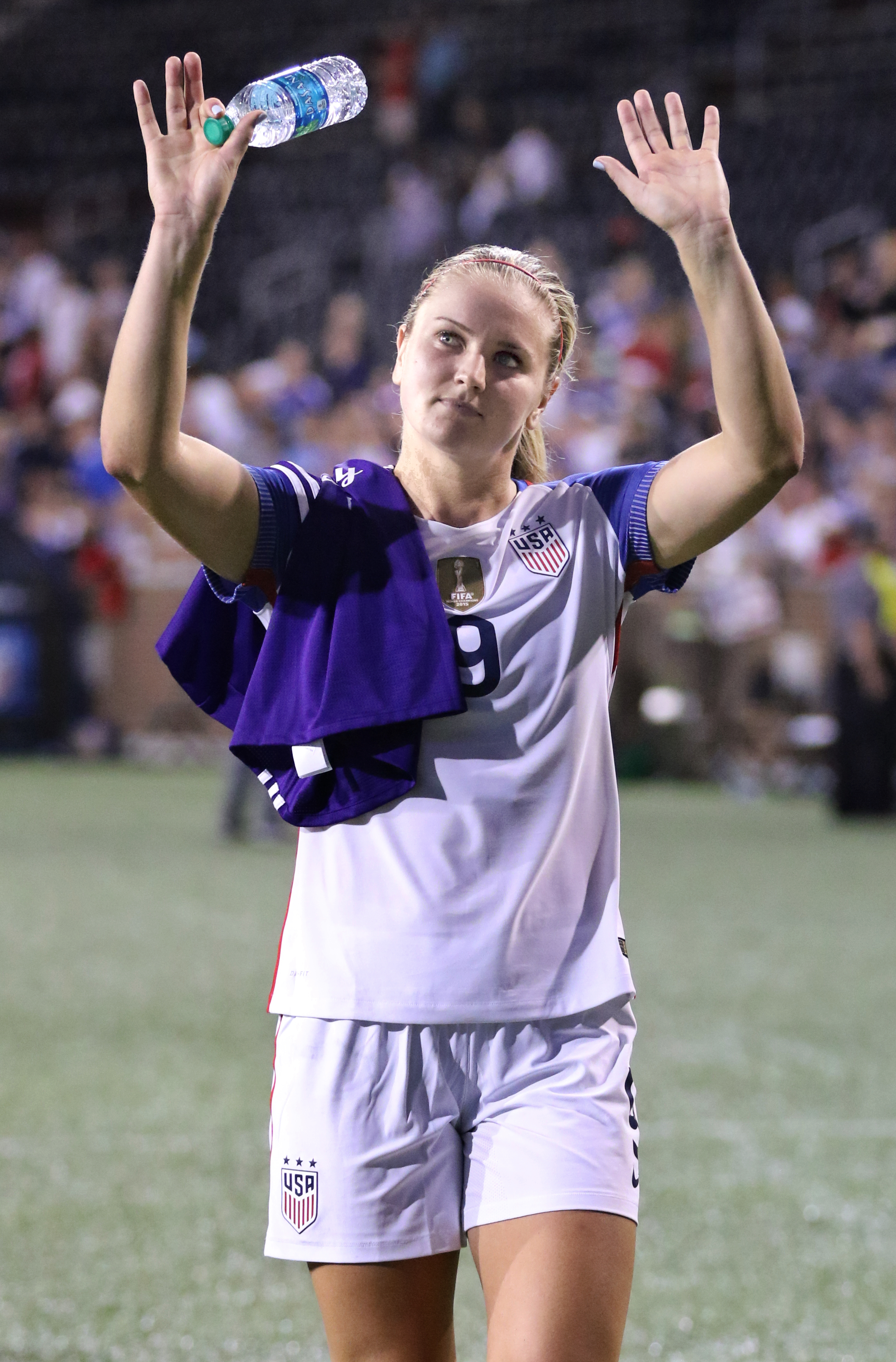
Lindsey Heaps

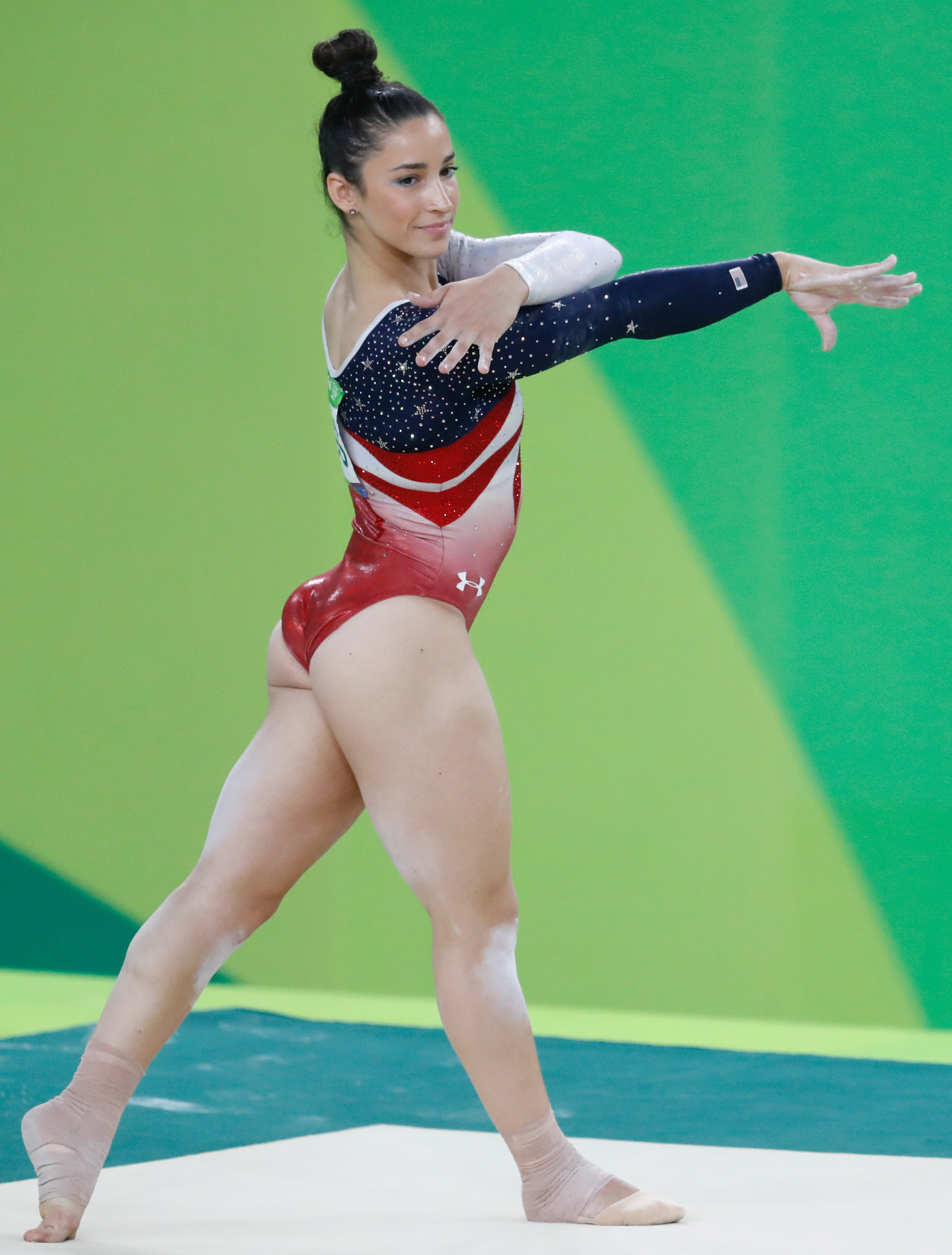
Aly Raisman

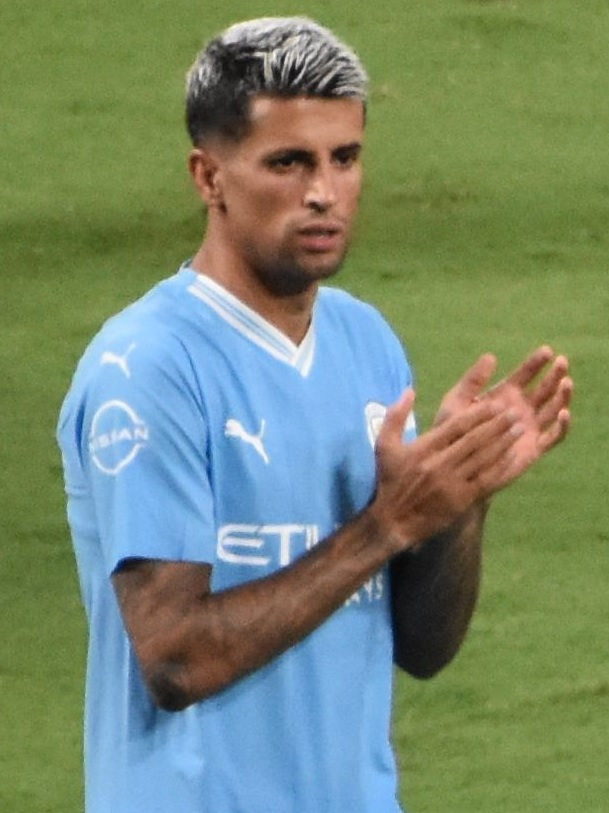
João Cancelo

- May 1 – Khamzat Chimaev, Russian born-Swedish mixed martial artist and professional wrestler
- May 2 – Alexander Choupenitch, Czech fencer
- May 4 – Zhu Yaming, Chinese triple jumper
- May 6
  - Mateo Kovačić, Croatian footballer
  - Juan Musso, Argentine footballer
- May 14
  - Pernille Blume, Danish swimmer
  - Marquinhos, Brazilian footballer
- May 17 – Julie Anne San Jose, Filipina singer-songwriter
- May 19 – Gabriela Guimarães, Brazilian volleyball player
- May 20 – Piotr Zieliński, Polish footballer
- May 21 – Tom Daley, British diver
- May 22
  - Athena Manoukian, Greek born-Armenian singer
  - Miho Takagi, Japanese speed skater
- May 24
  - Jarell Martin, American basketball player
  - Daiya Seto, Japanese swimmer
- May 25 – Aly Raisman, American gymnast and model
- May 27
  - João Cancelo, Portuguese footballer
  - Aymeric Laporte, French born-Spanish footballer
  - Aleksandra Uznańska-Wiśniewska, Polish–Thai politician, political scientist, and humanitarian

=== June ===
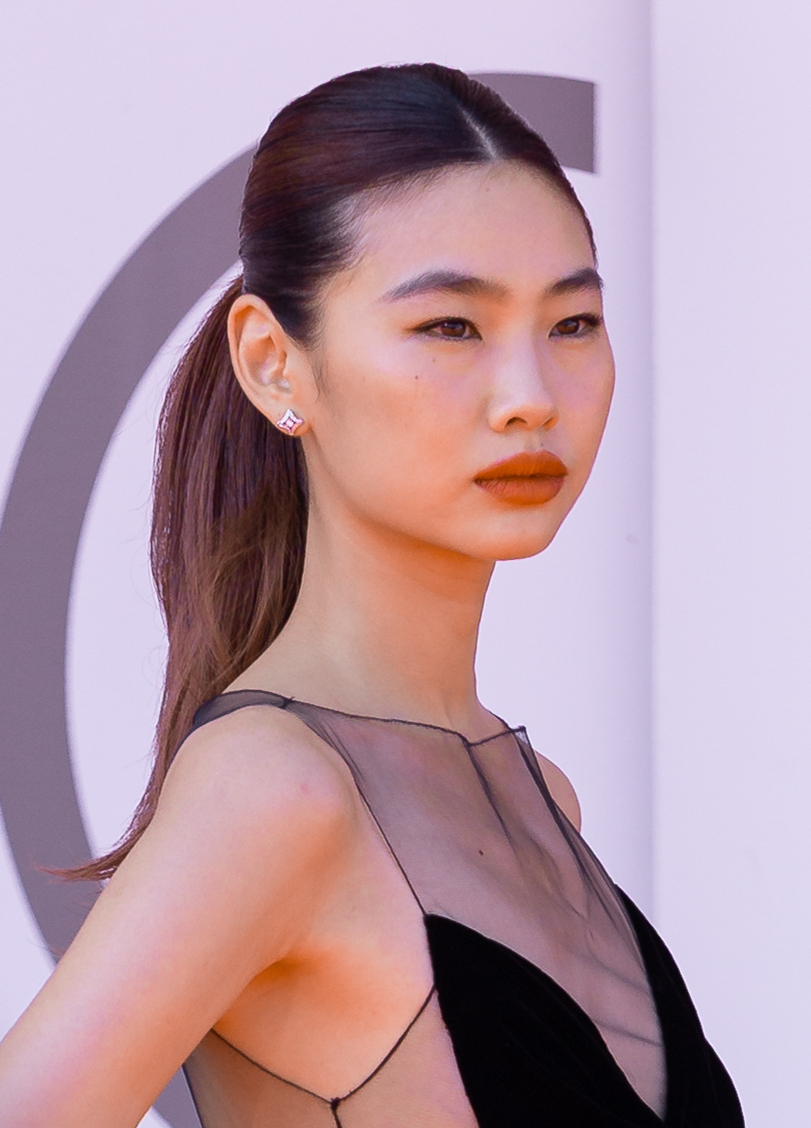
Jung Ho-yeon

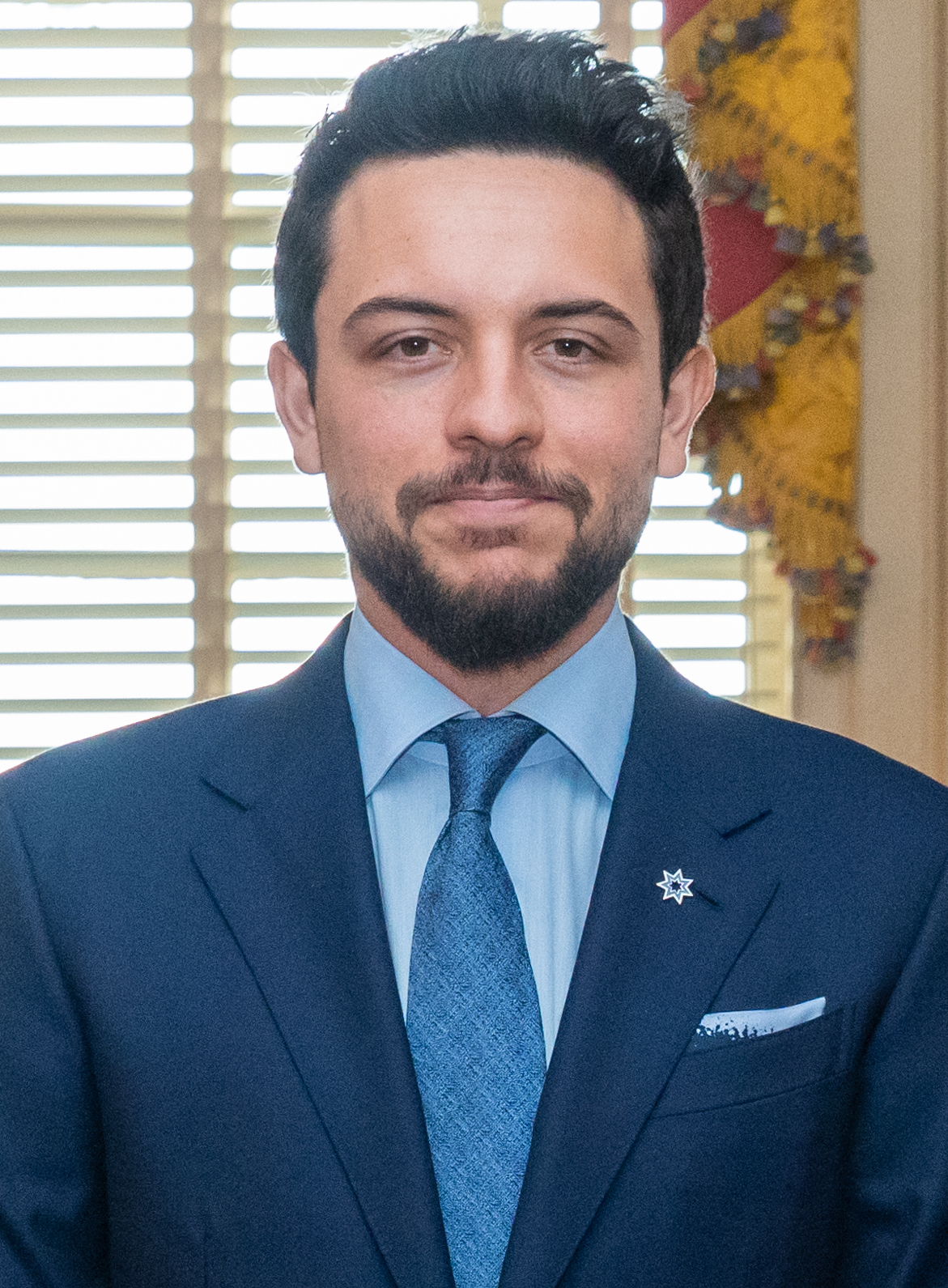
Hussein, Crown Prince of Jordan

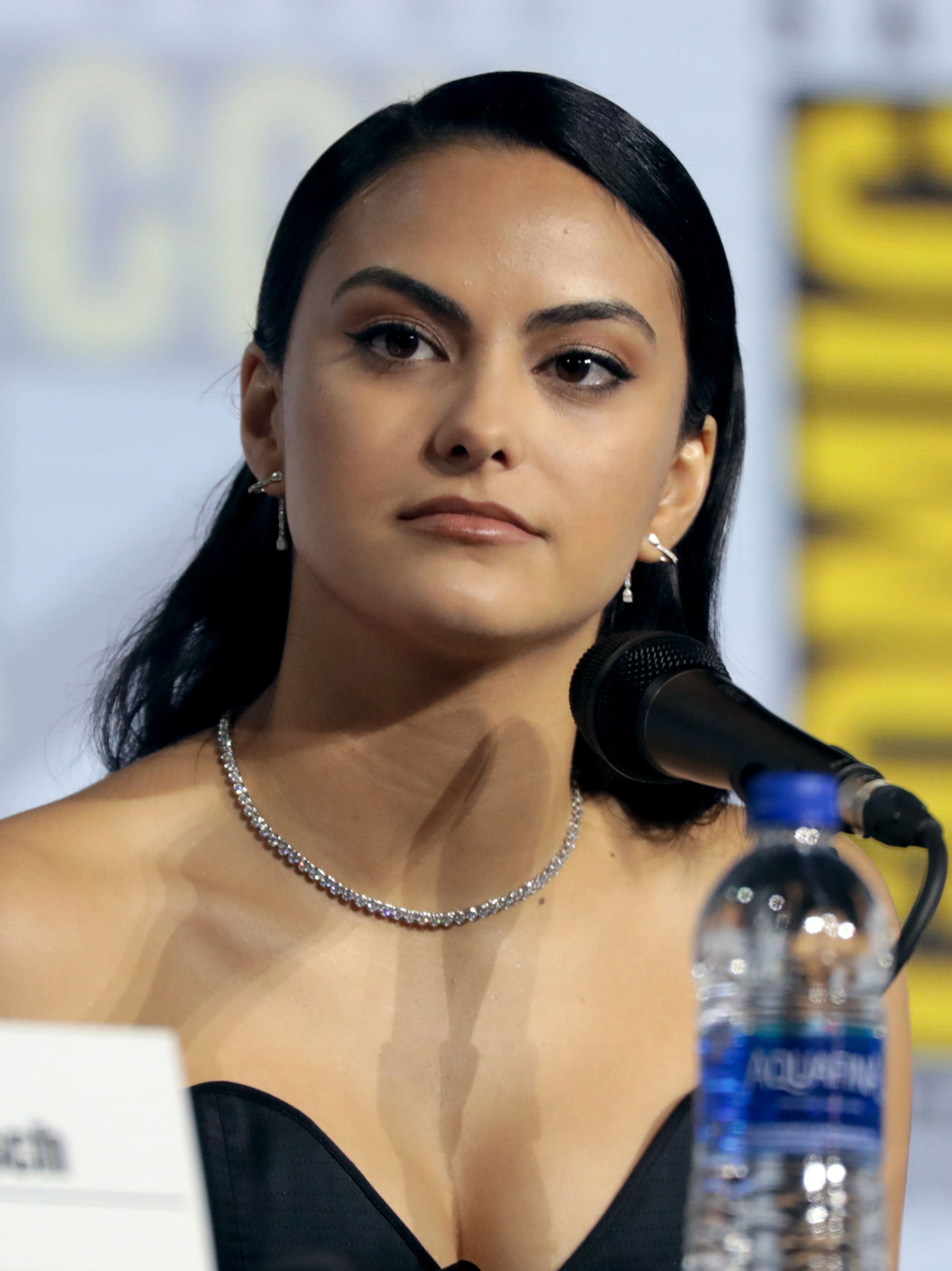
Camila Mendes

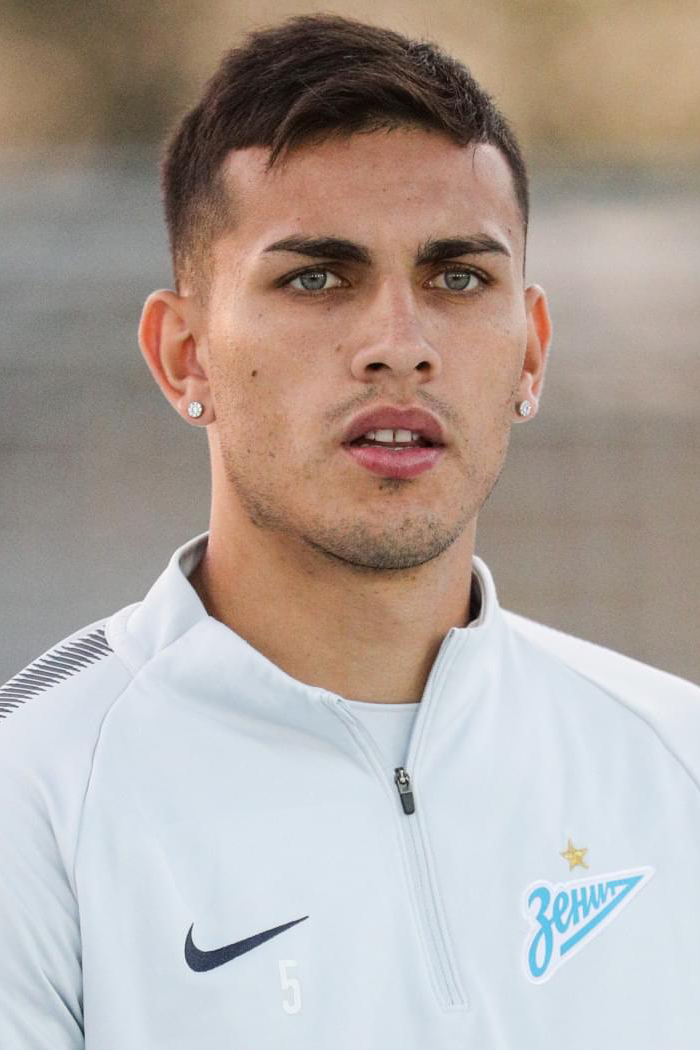
Leandro Paredes

- June 8 – Song Yoo-jung, South Korean actress and model (d. 2021)
- June 10 – Cheung Ka Long, Hong Kong foil fencer
- June 11
  - Ivana Baquero, Spanish actress
  - Jessica Fox, Australian canoeist
- June 15
  - Vincent Janssen, Dutch footballer
  - Lee Kiefer, American fencer
- June 19 – Lejla Njemčević, Bosnian cross-country and mountain bike cyclist
- June 20 – Sarah Köhler, German swimmer
- June 23 – Jung Ho-yeon, South Korean actress
- June 24 – Lily Williams, American cyclist
- June 25 – Lauren Price, Welsh boxer
- June 28
  - Anish Giri, Russian born-Dutch chess grandmaster
  - Hussein, Crown Prince of Jordan, heir apparent of Jordan
- June 29
  - Camila Mendes, American actress
  - Leandro Paredes, Argentinian footballer

=== July ===
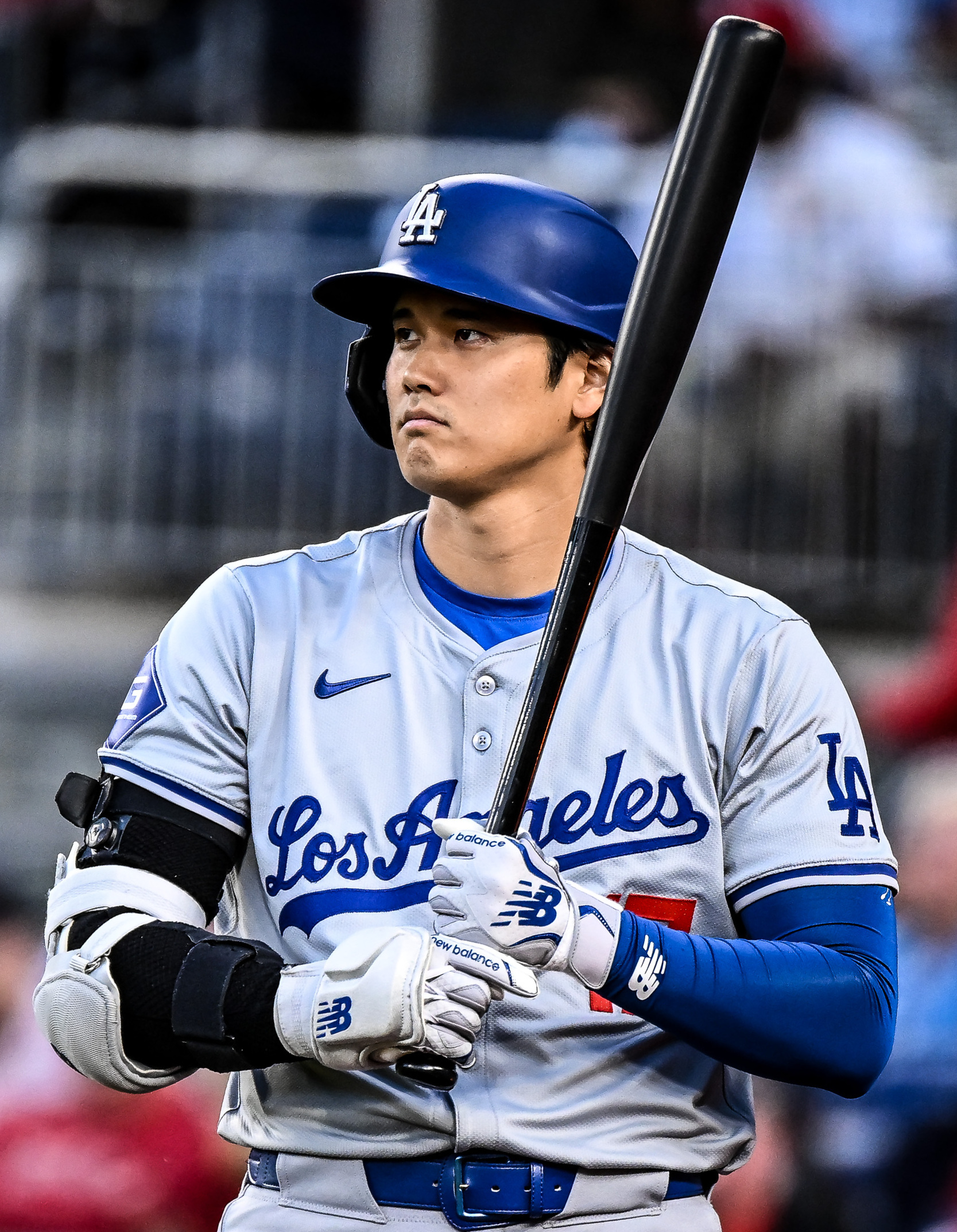
Shohei Ohtani

- July 2 – Baba Rahman, Ghanaian footballer
- July 4 – Era Istrefi, Kosovar-Albanian singer and songwriter.
- July 5
  - Robin Gosens, German footballer
  - Shohei Ohtani, Japanese baseball player
  - Sơn Tùng M-TP, Vietnamese singer
- July 9 – Akiane Kramarik, American poet and painter
- July 11
  - Lucas Ocampos, Argentine footballer
  - Jake Wightman, British middle-distance runner
- July 12 – Molly Seidel, American marathon runner
- July 17
  - Victor Lindelöf, Swedish footballer
  - Benjamin Mendy, French footballer
- July 25 – Bianka Buša, Serbian volleyball player
- July 27
  - Winnie Harlow, Canadian model
  - Sándor Tótka, Hungarian canoeist
- July 31 – Liang Xinping, Chinese synchronised swimmer

=== August ===
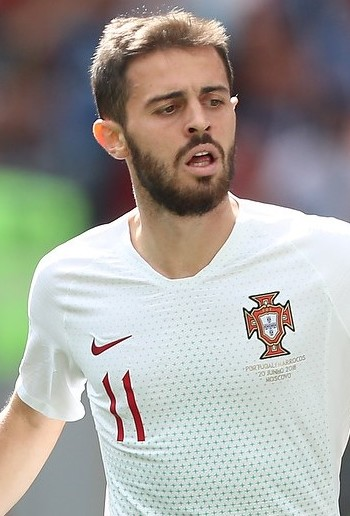
Bernardo Silva

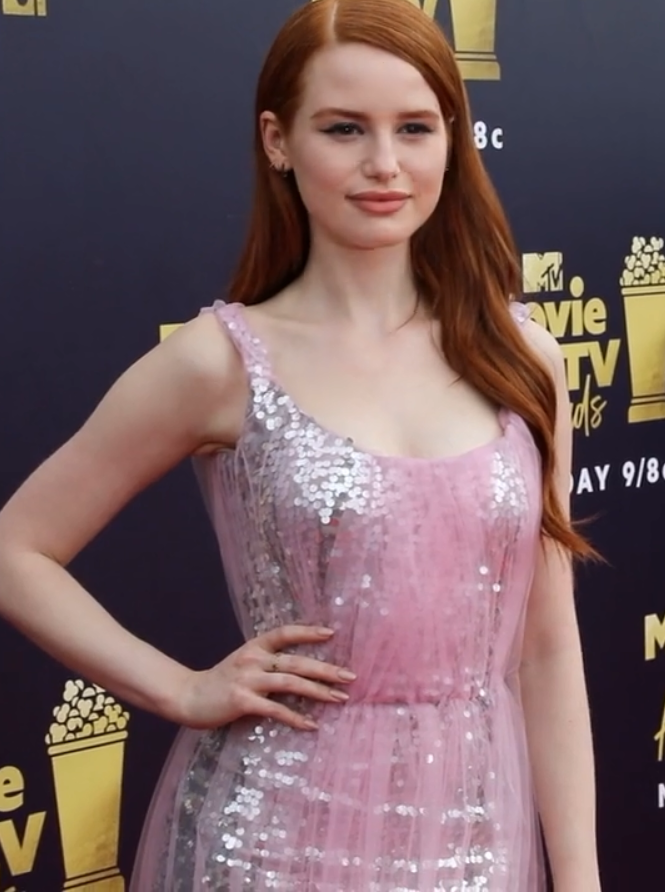
Madelaine Petsch

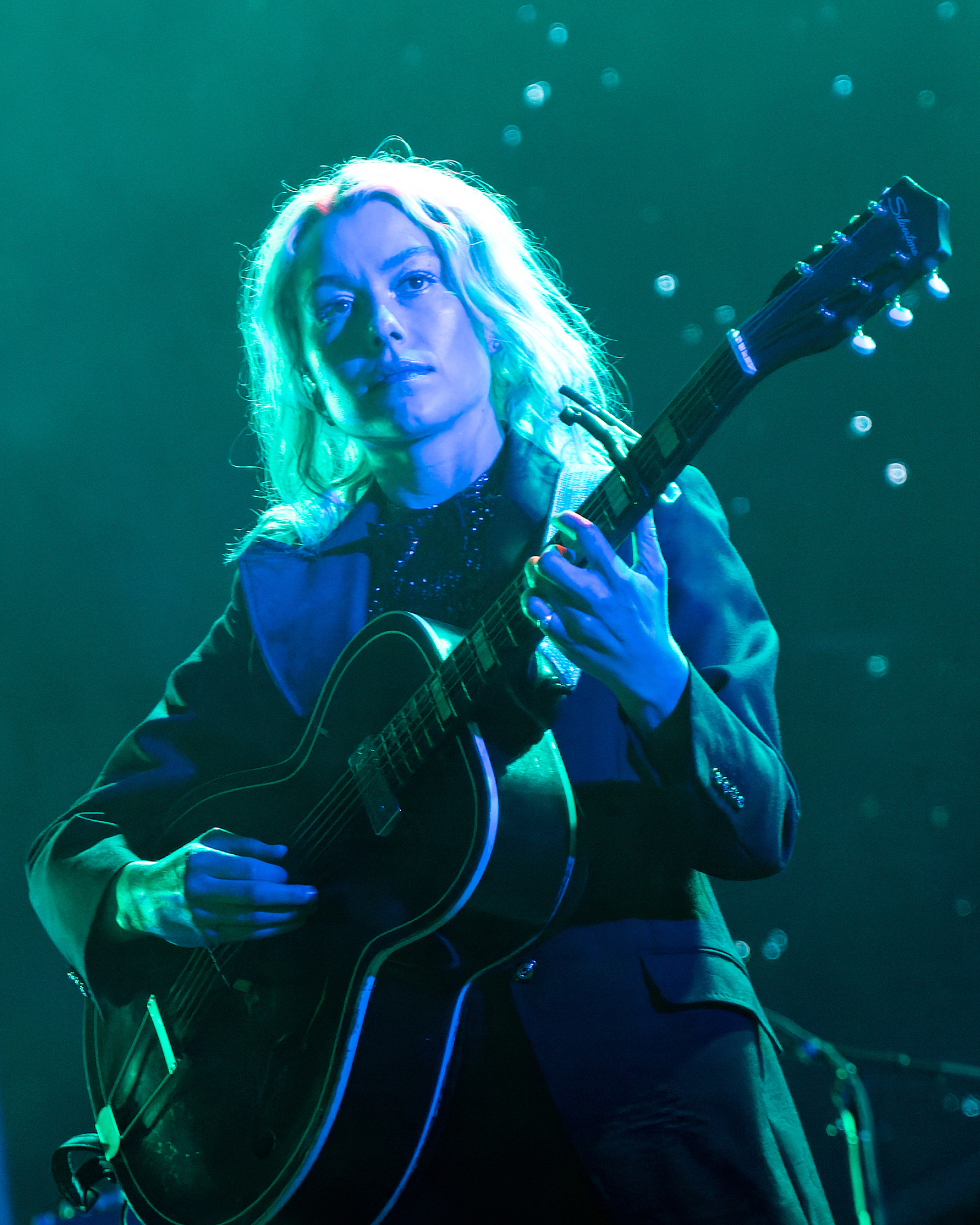
Phoebe Bridgers

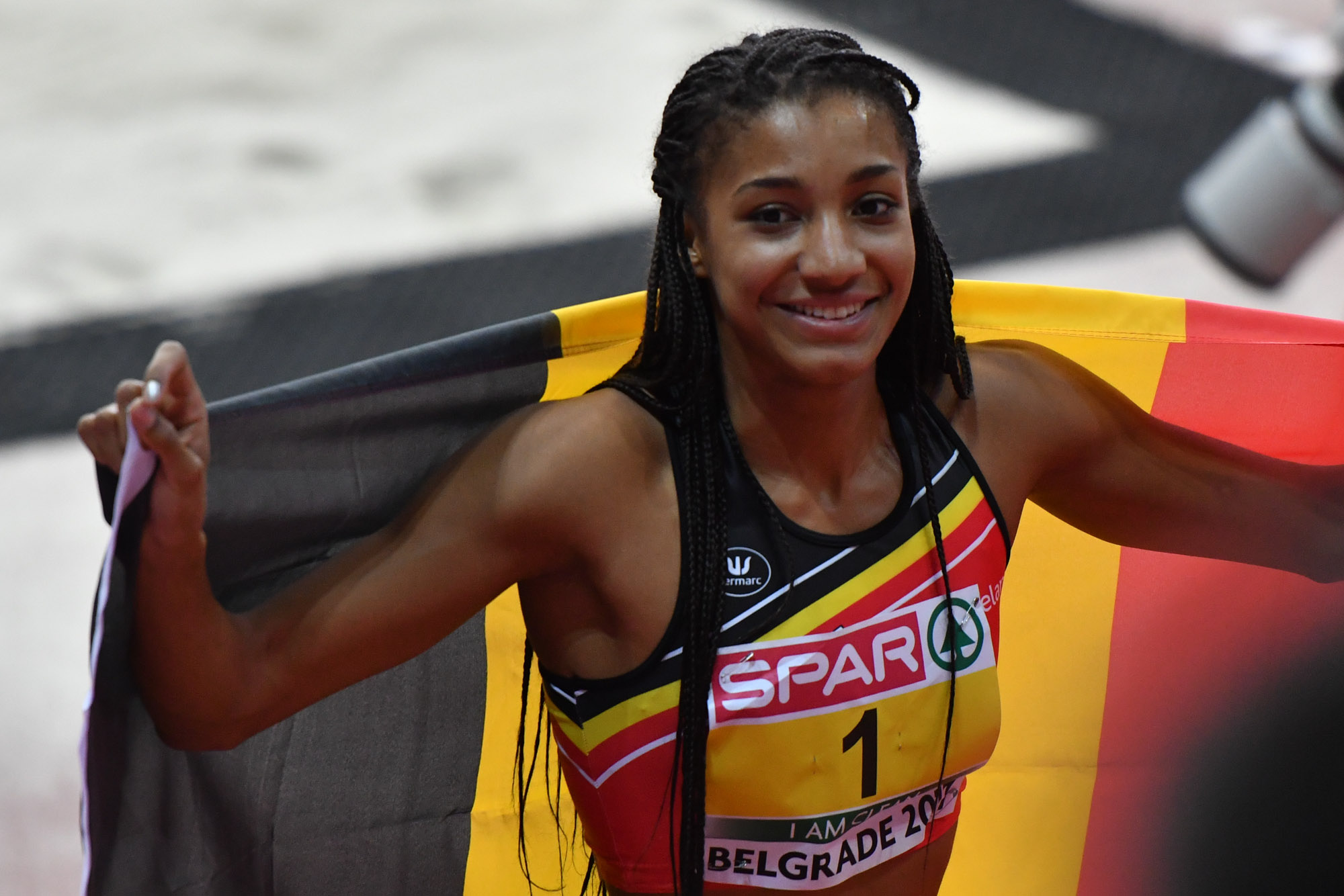
Nafissatou Thiam

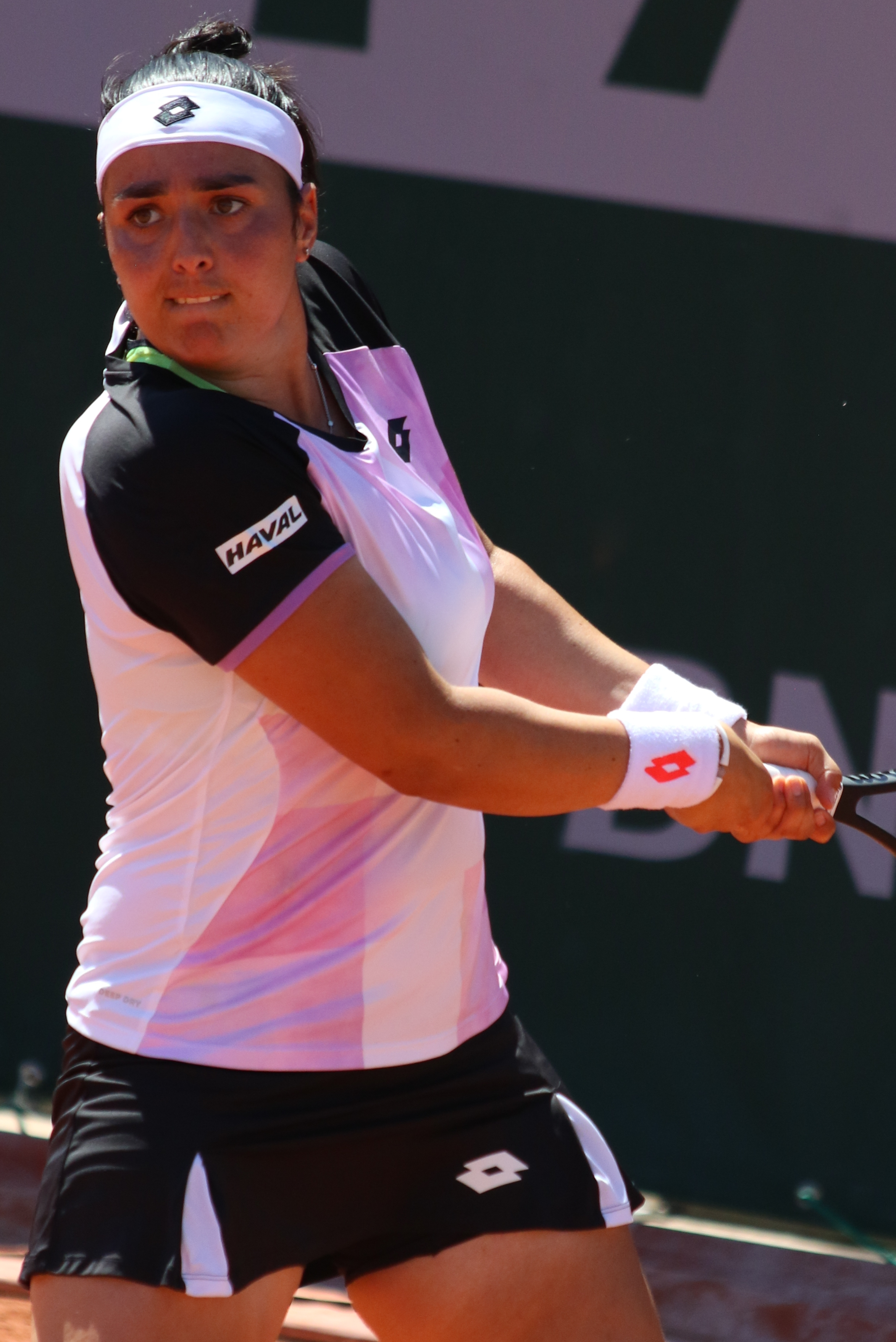
Ons Jabeur

- August 1 – Sayaka Hirota, Japanese badminton player
- August 2 – Tang Yuanting, Chinese badminton player
- August 8 – Lauv, American singer-songwriter
- August 10 – Bernardo Silva, Portuguese footballer
- August 11 – Song I-han, South Korean singer
- August 13
  - Joaquín Correa, Argentine footballer
  - Cianna Lieffers, Canadian ice hockey referee
- August 15 – Natalia Zabiiako, Estonian born-Russian pair skater
- August 17 – Taissa Farmiga, American actress
- August 18 – Madelaine Petsch, American actress
- August 19
  - Katja Salskov-Iversen, Danish sailor
  - Nafissatou Thiam, Belgian athlete
- August 23 – Dara Howell, Canadian freestyle skier
- August 24
  - Kelsey Plum, American basketball player
  - Breanna Stewart, American basketball player
- August 28 – Ons Jabeur, Tunisian tennis player
- August 30 – Kwon So-hyun, South Korean actress and singer

=== September ===
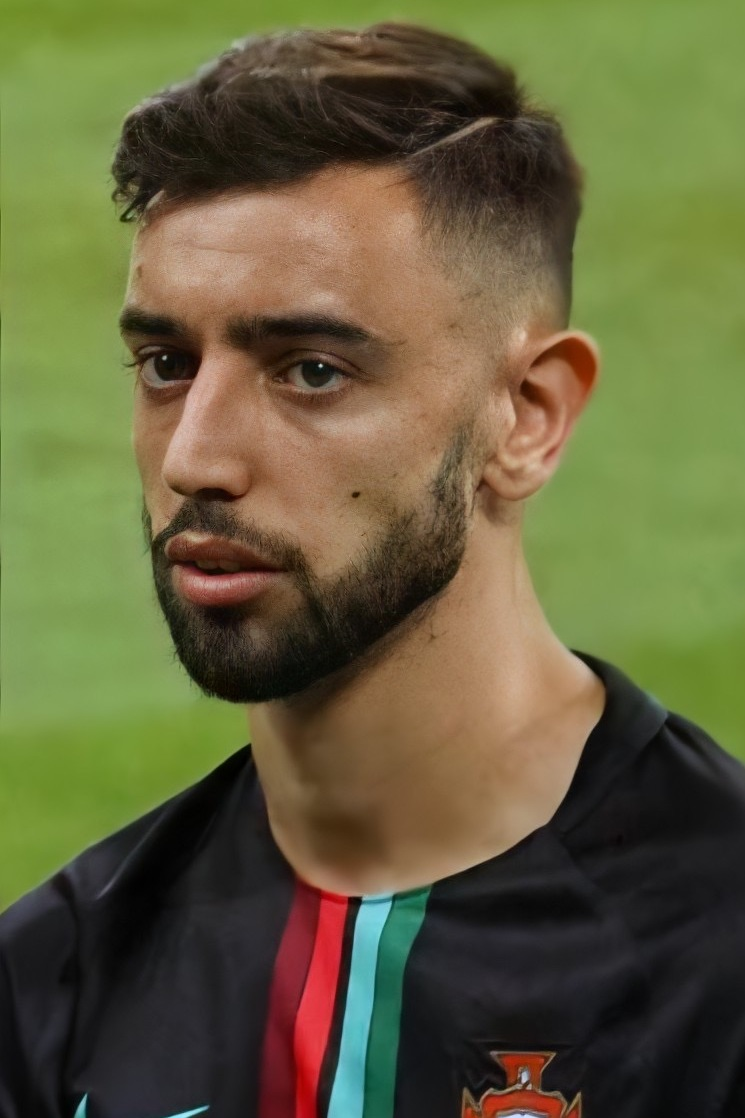
Bruno Fernandes

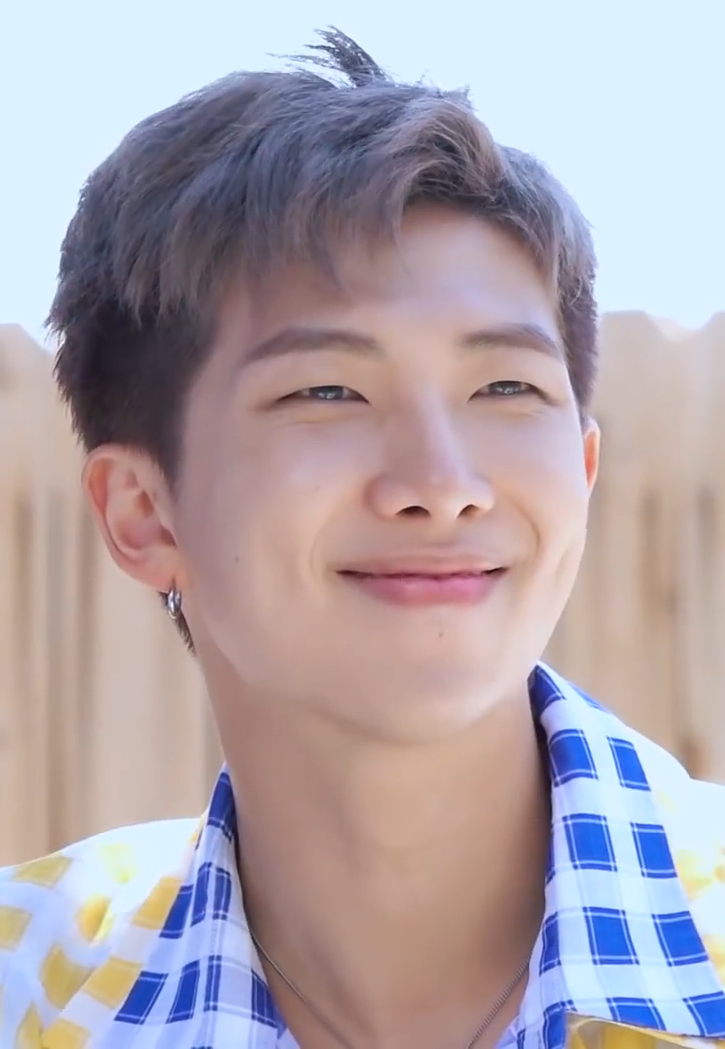
RM

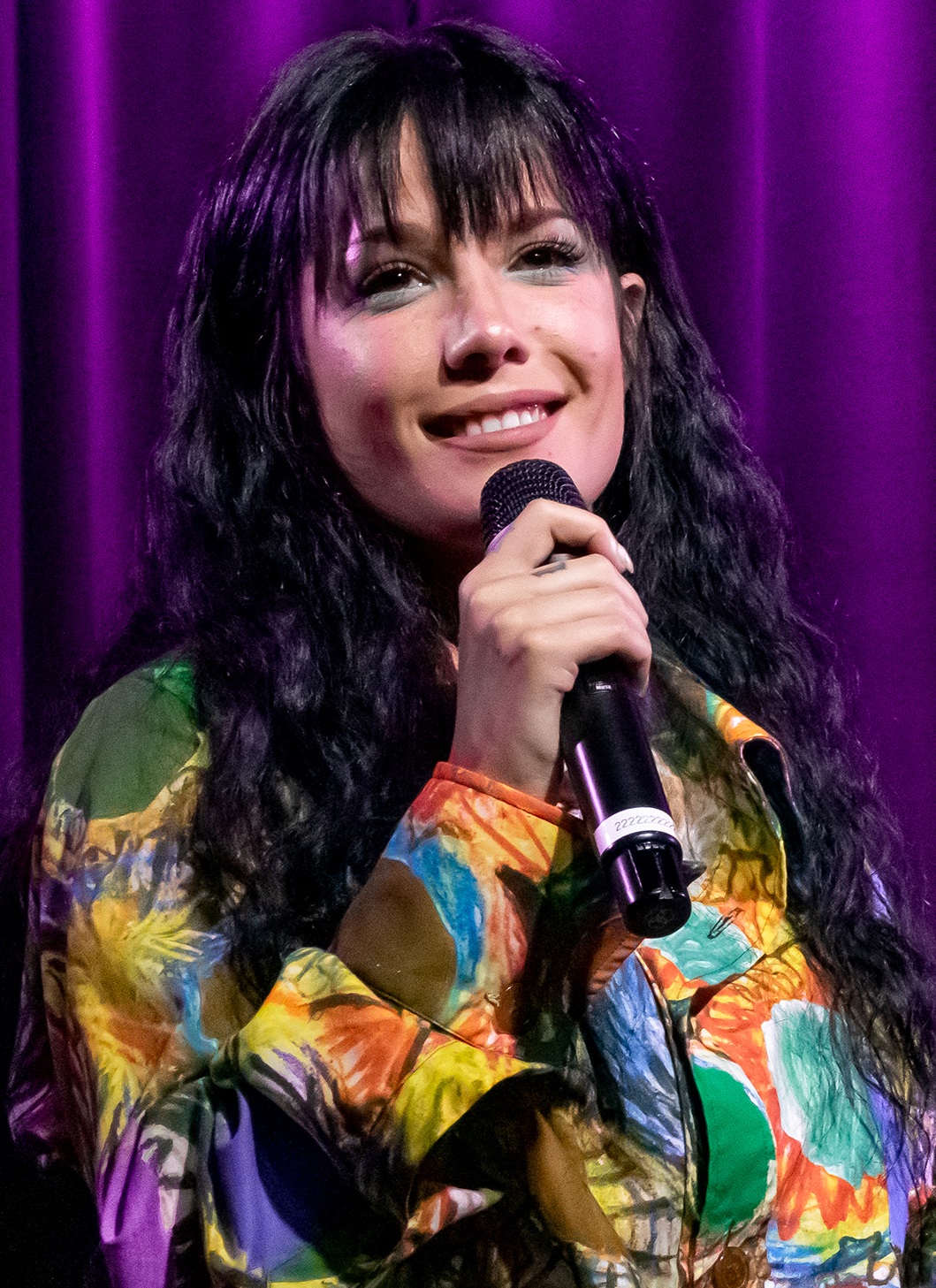
Halsey

- September 1
  - Kento Momota, Japanese badminton player
  - Bianca Ryan, American singer-songwriter
- September 5 – Gregorio Paltrinieri, Italian swimmer
- September 7
  - Elinor Barker, Welsh racing cyclist
  - Kento Yamazaki, Japanese actor
- September 12
  - Mhairi Black, Scottish politician
  - RM, South Korean rapper and songwriter
  - Elina Svitolina, Ukrainian tennis player
- September 16
  - Aleksandar Mitrović, Serbian footballer
  - Mina Popović, Serbian volleyball player
- September 23 – Yerry Mina, Colombian footballer
- September 29
  - Halsey, American singer
  - Nicholas Galitzine, English actor
  - Katarzyna Niewiadoma, Polish racing cyclist

=== October ===
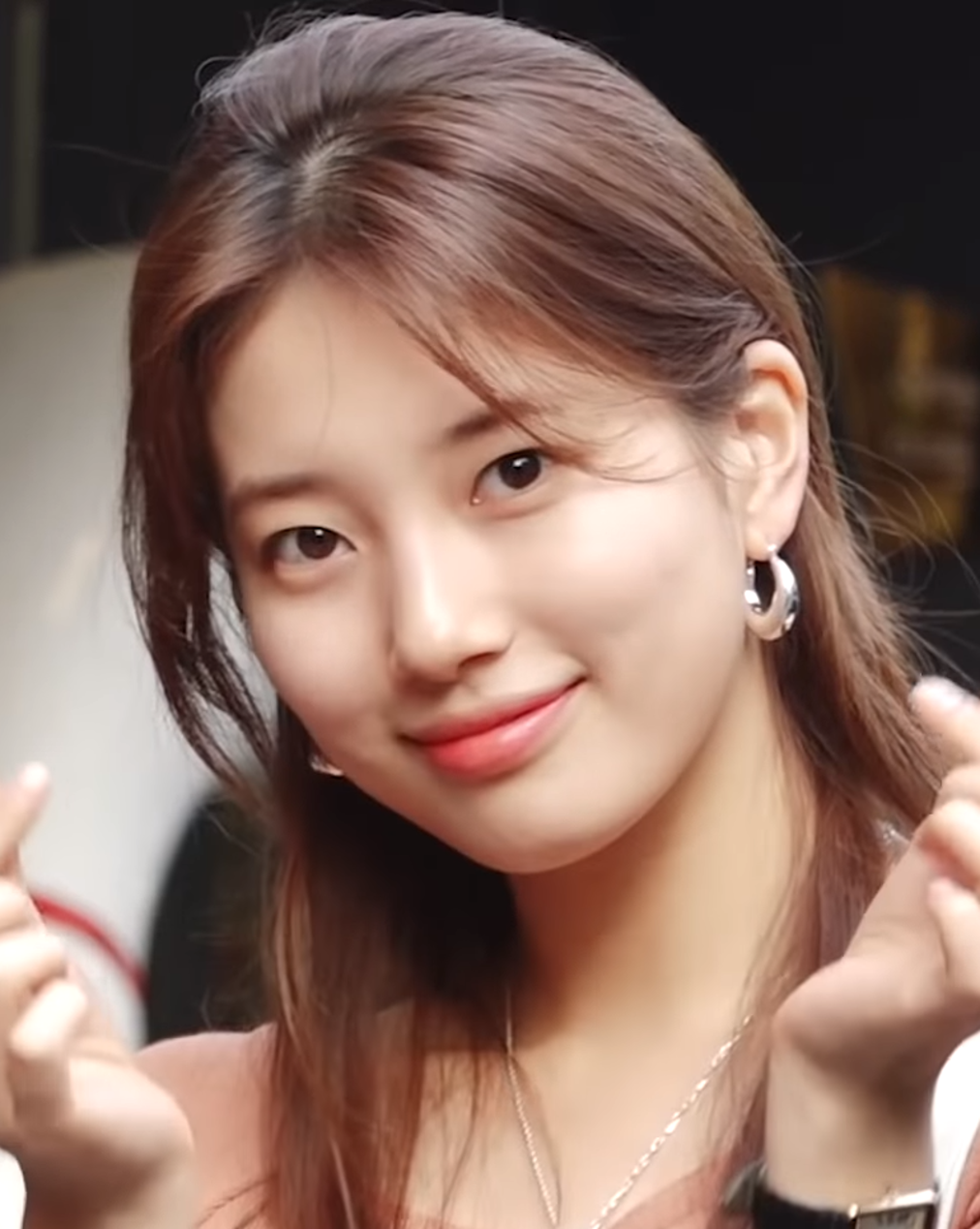
Bae Suzy

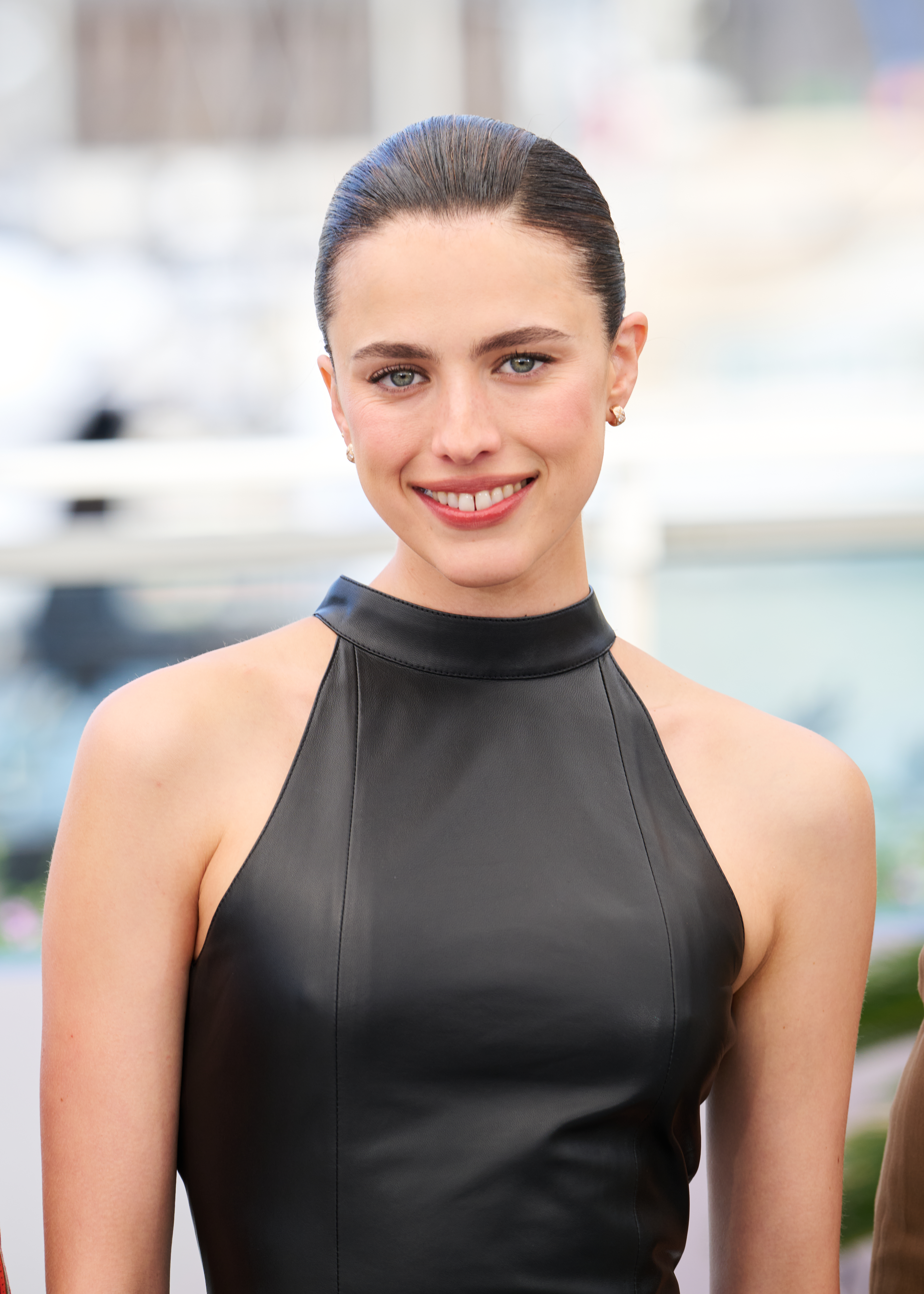
Margaret Qualley

- October 1
  - Trézéguet, Egyptian footballer
  - Arthur Van Doren, Belgian field hockey player
- October 8 – Luca Hänni, Swiss singer-songwriter
- October 9 – Jodelle Ferland, Canadian actress
- October 10 – Bae Suzy, South Korean singer and actress
- October 12 – Olivia Smoliga, American swimmer
- October 17
  - Sara Dosho, Japanese wrestler
  - Alejandra Valencia, Mexican archer
- October 18 – Pascal Wehrlein, German-Mauritian racing driver
- October 20 – Festus Talam, Kenyan athlete
- October 22 – Carline van Breugel, Dutch politician
  - Alberta Santuccio, Italian fencer
- October 23 – Margaret Qualley, actress
- October 24
  - Krystal Jung, American-South Korean singer
  - Sean O'Malley, American mixed martial artist fighter
- October 26 – Matthew Hudson-Smith, British sprinter

=== November ===
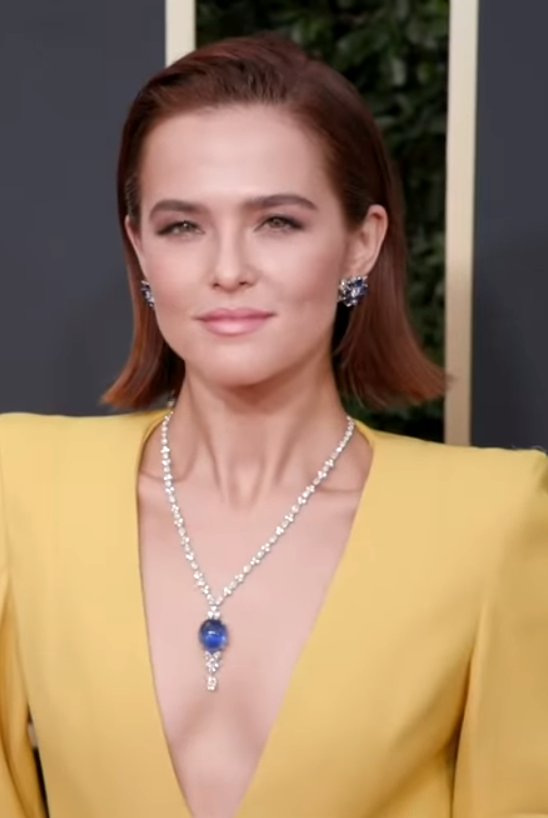
Zoey Deutch

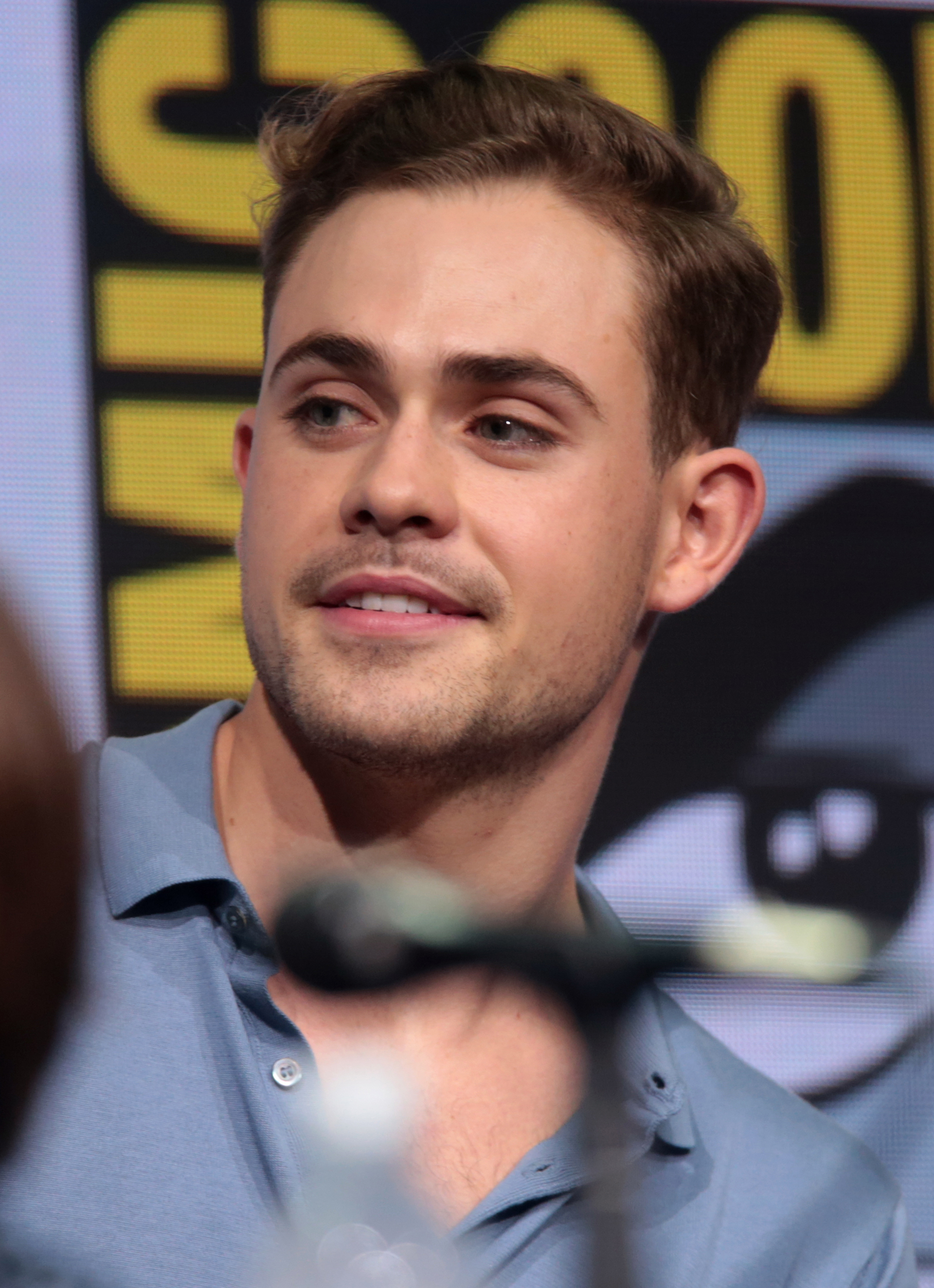
Dacre Montgomery

- November 8 – Wang Yilyu, Chinese badminton player
- November 10
  - Takuma Asano, Japanese footballer
  - Zoey Deutch, American actress
- November 13 – Laurien Leurink, Dutch field hockey player
- November 18 – Cédric Follador, Swiss bobsledder
- November 21 – Kit Wilson, British professional wrestler
- November 22 – Dacre Montgomery, Australian actor
- November 24 – Nabil Bentaleb, Algerian footballer
- November 29
  - Julius Randle, American basketball player
  - Zhu Ting, Chinese volleyball player

=== December ===
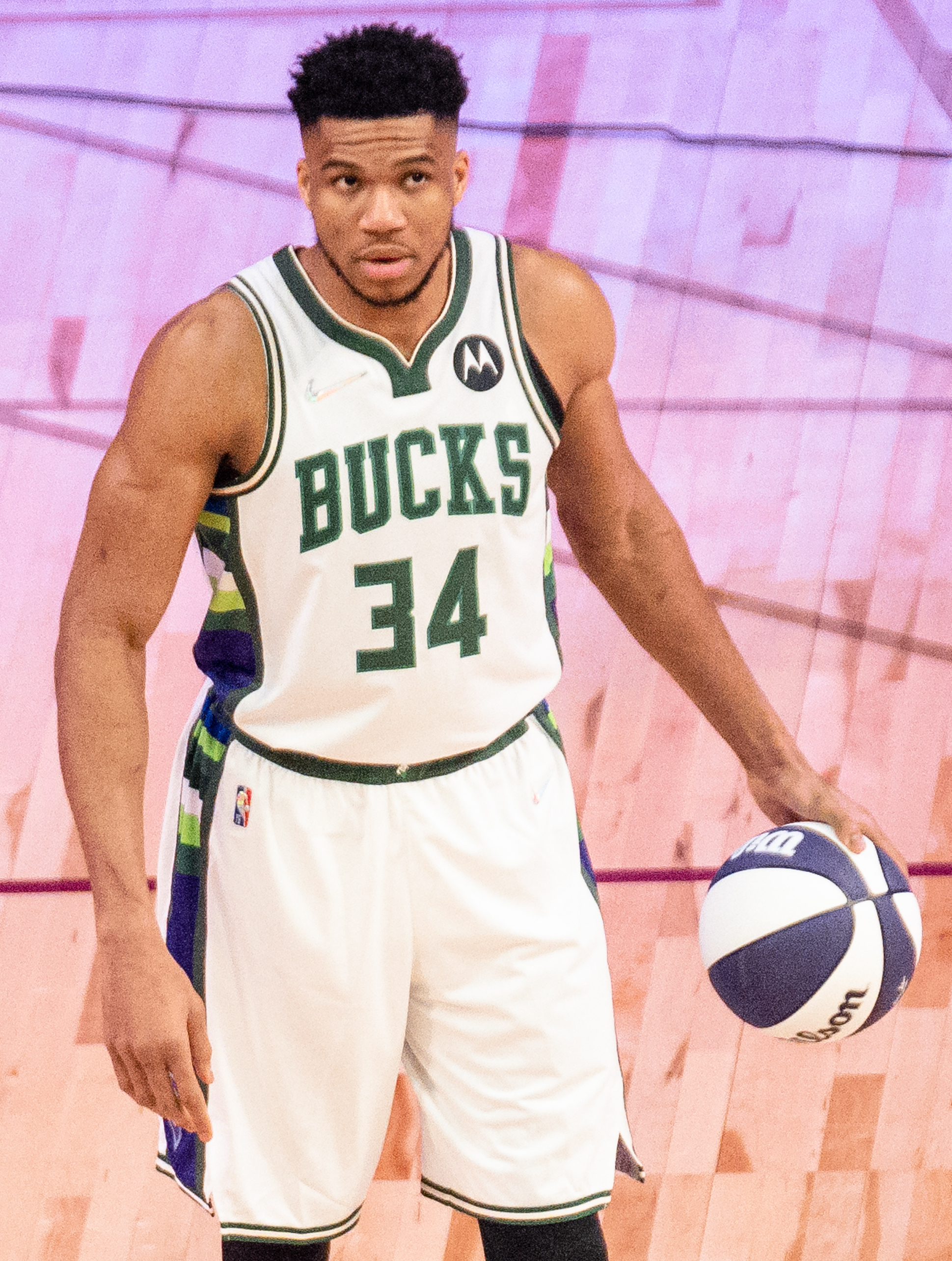
Giannis Antetokounmpo

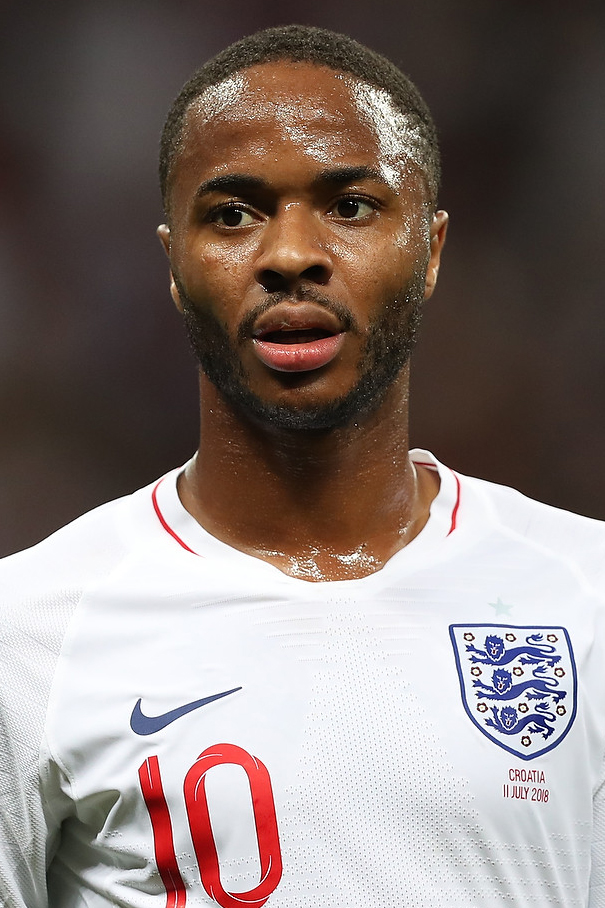
Raheem Sterling

- December 3 – Jake T. Austin, American actor
- December 6 – Giannis Antetokounmpo, Greek basketball player
- December 7 – Yuzuru Hanyu, Japanese figure skater
- December 8
  - Conseslus Kipruto, Kenyan middle-distance runner
  - Raheem Sterling, Jamaican-born English footballer
- December 10 – Lily Owsley, British field hockey player
- December 17 – Nat Wolff, American actor
- December 18 – Vlada Chigireva, Russian synchronised swimmer
- December 19
  - Katrina Lehis, Estonian fencer
  - M'Baye Niang, French-Senegalese footballer
- December 20 – Emmanuel Niyoyabikoze, Burundian environmental activist
- December 21 – Daniel Amartey, Ghanaian footballer
- December 24 – Jennifer Valente, American cyclist
- December 28 – Adam Peaty, English swimmer
- December 29 – Princess Kako of Akishino, Japanese princess
- December 30 – Hannah Martin, British field hockey player
- December 31 – Max Bowden, English actor

== Nobel Prizes ==
The Nobel Prize medallion.

- Physics – Bertram Brockhouse, Clifford Shull
- Chemistry – George Andrew Olah
- Medicine – Alfred G. Gilman, Martin Rodbell
- Literature – Kenzaburō Ōe
- Peace – Yasser Arafat, Shimon Peres, Yitzhak Rabin
- Nobel Memorial Prize in Economic Sciences – Reinhard Selten, John Forbes Nash Jr., John Harsanyi

== Templeton Prize ==
- Michael Novak

== Fields Medal ==
- Efim Zelmanov, Pierre-Louis Lions, Jean Bourgain, Jean-Christophe Yoccoz

== Right Livelihood Award ==
- Astrid Lindgren, SERVOL (Service Volunteered for All), H. Sudarshan / VGKK (Vivekananda Girijana Kalyana Kendra), Ken Saro-Wiwa / MOSOP (Movement for the Survival of the Ogoni People)
