= Anarchism in Argentina =

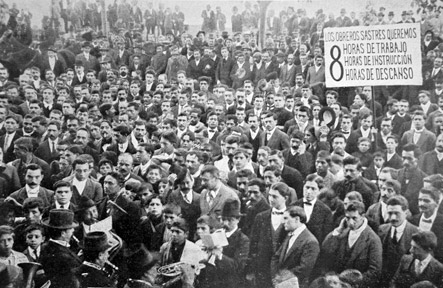
Anarchist demonstration around 1900

The Argentine anarchist movement was one of the strongest such movements in South America. It saw great support between 1890 and the start of a series of military governments in 1930. During this period, it was dominated by anarchist communists and anarcho-syndicalists. The movement's theories were a hybrid of European anarchist thought and local elements, just as it consisted demographically of both European immigrant workers and native Argentines.

== Early years ==
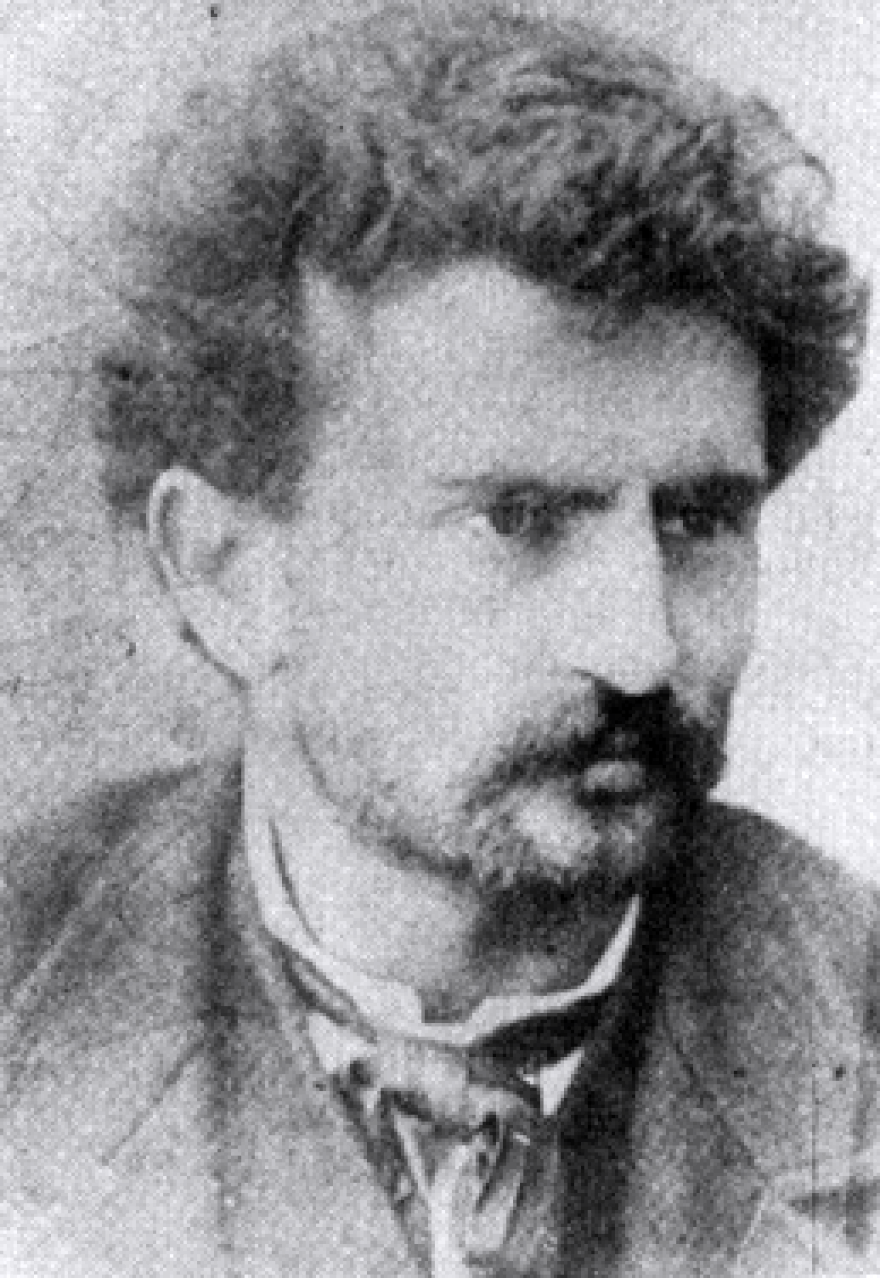
Errico Malatesta

The first Argentine anarchist groups appeared in the 1870s. A section of the First International was founded in the Argentine capital of Buenos Aires in either 1871 or 1872, but at first it was explicitly part of neither the International's anarchist nor its Marxist wing. By 1879, there were several sections in Argentina, with anarchists in control of all of them. In 1876, adherents of Bakunin's ideals founded the Center for Workers' Propaganda. In 1879, El Descamisado became the first anarchist newspaper in the country. The well-known Italian anarchist Errico Malatesta was in Argentina from 1885 to 1889. With his help, the first anarchist trade union was started in 1887: Sociedad Cosmopolita de Resistencia y Colocación de Obreros Panaderos. In 1890, another anarchist organ El perseguido started its publication.

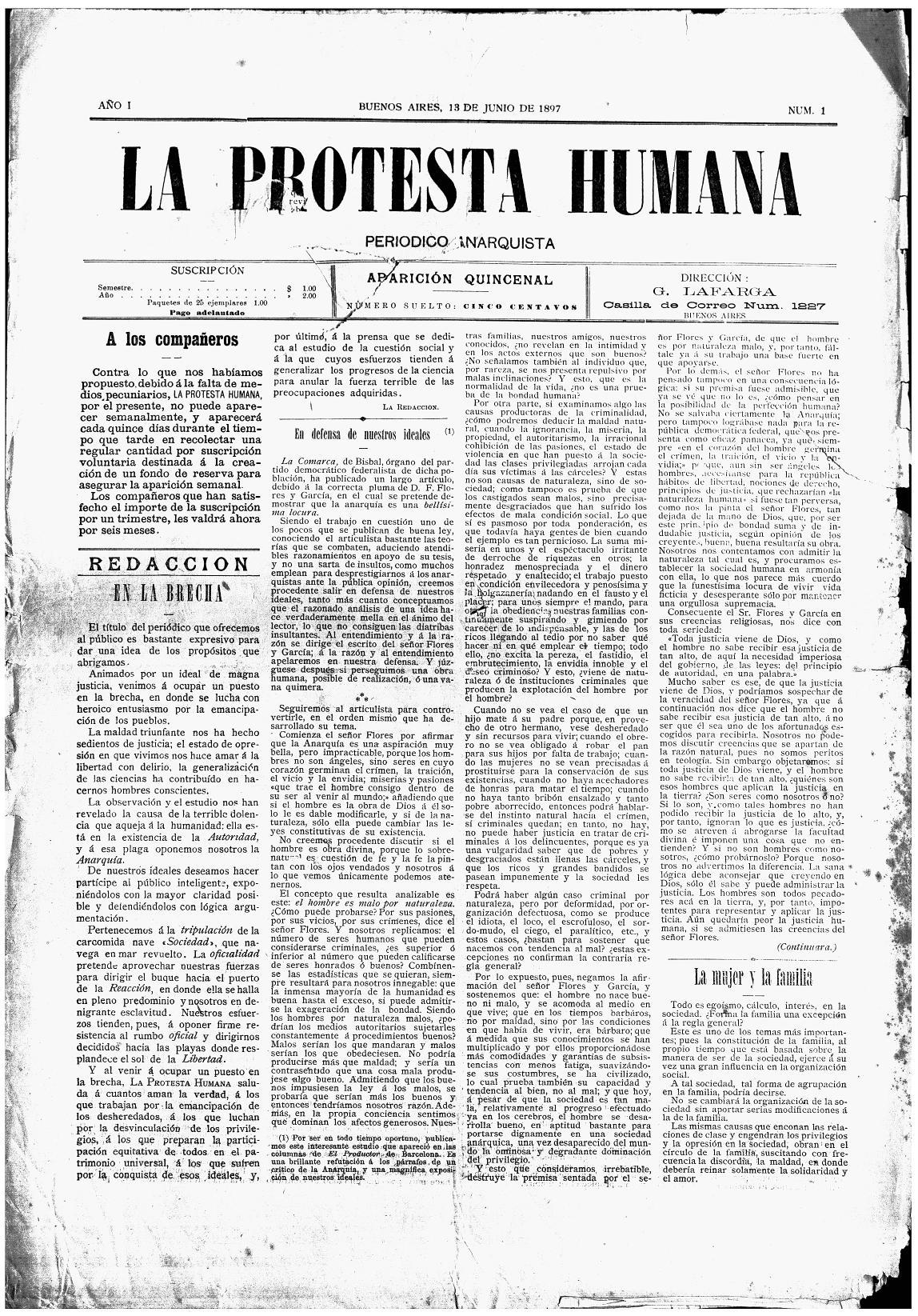
The first edition of La Protesta Humana, 1897

During this time the Argentine anarchist movement was split over the question of organization. There was a, mostly communist anarchist, wing advocating workers' organizations, deeming them the natural weapon for the anarchist struggle. The opponents of organizations, both communist and individualist anarchists, in turn claimed organizations forced those working within them to become reformists and give up their revolutionary stance. Until his departure in 1889, Malatesta helped bridge this gap and minimize the tensions and rivalries between the two wings, but after he left, they broke out once again. The pro-organizers were strengthened in 1891 by the arrivals of the Spanish anarchist Antoni Pellicer in 1891 and the Italian Pietro Gori in 1898. In 1897, the proponents of trade unions also founded the weekly newspaper La Protesta Humana. In 1900, Paraire published a series of articles in La Protesta Humana under the title "Labor Organization" advocating a dual organization concept: a militant labor federation for economic, and a genuinely anarchist organization for political matters. Other works of writing regarding anarchist activities were also published around this time. La Voz de la Mujer was an anarcha-feminist newspaper founded in Argentina in 1896 that was the first of its kind. It was dedicated to defending anarchist communism from a feminist perspective. Early figures of the anarchist movement, such as Virginia Bolten, were said to have contributed to the newspaper. Her acclaimed skills as a speaker helped to push the ideas of anarcha-feminism and anarchist communism to the frontline of the anarchist movement in the early years.

== FORA founding and radicalization ==
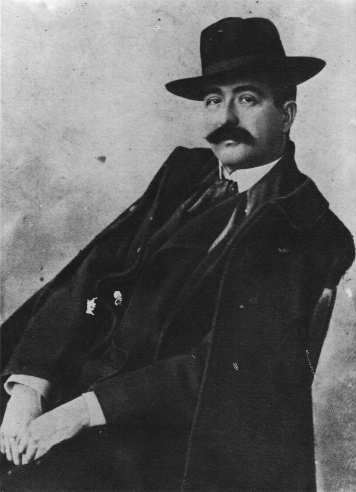
Pietro Gori

In 1901, Argentina's first national labor confederation, the Argentine Workers' Federation (FOA), was founded. Although its founding principles were influenced by Paraire and Gori, it was at first a joint project with the socialists. In 1902, the first general strike in Argentine history took place. It led to the passing of the Residence Law, which gave the government the power to deport "subversive foreigners". This law was used to expel hundreds of anarchists, while a great number of them fled to Montevideo in Uruguay only to reenter the country afterwards. In 1903, La Protesta Humana was renamed as La Protesta, the name under it which exists to this day. In the same year, the moderate wing of the FOA left the federation to form the General Workers' Union (UGT), thus leaving the hegemony in the FOA to the anarchists. They renamed the union as Argentine Regional Workers' Federation (FORA) as a sign of the organization's internationalism in 1904. In 1905, at the FORA's fifth congress, its adherence to anarchism was formalized. In a resolution, it declared that it should "inculcate in the workers the economic and philosophical principles of anarchocommunism". This resolution became the basic policy for the following years. The FORA disagreed with the revolutionary syndicalists over the question of the unions' role after a revolution. While the anarcho-communists viewed labor unions as a by-product of capitalist society, which would have to be dissolved with the establishment of an anarchist society, the syndicalists viewed their unions' democratic structure as a model for the society they envisioned and wanted the unions to be the basis of such a new society. A series of strikes, many of them instigated by the anarchists, followed in 1905.

During this period the anarchist movement experienced rapid growth. 50 to 70% of the males in the working class were disenfranchised, because they were not native Argentines. Hence the legal political framework was not an option for them and anarchism gained appeal. The movement's strength and its relationship to the state is demonstrated by the events on May 1, 1904. 70,000 anarchist workers marched in the streets of La Boca (Buenos Aires' total population was of 900,000). Proscribed by Roca's government, the demonstration ended in the death of Juan Ocampo, a teenager.

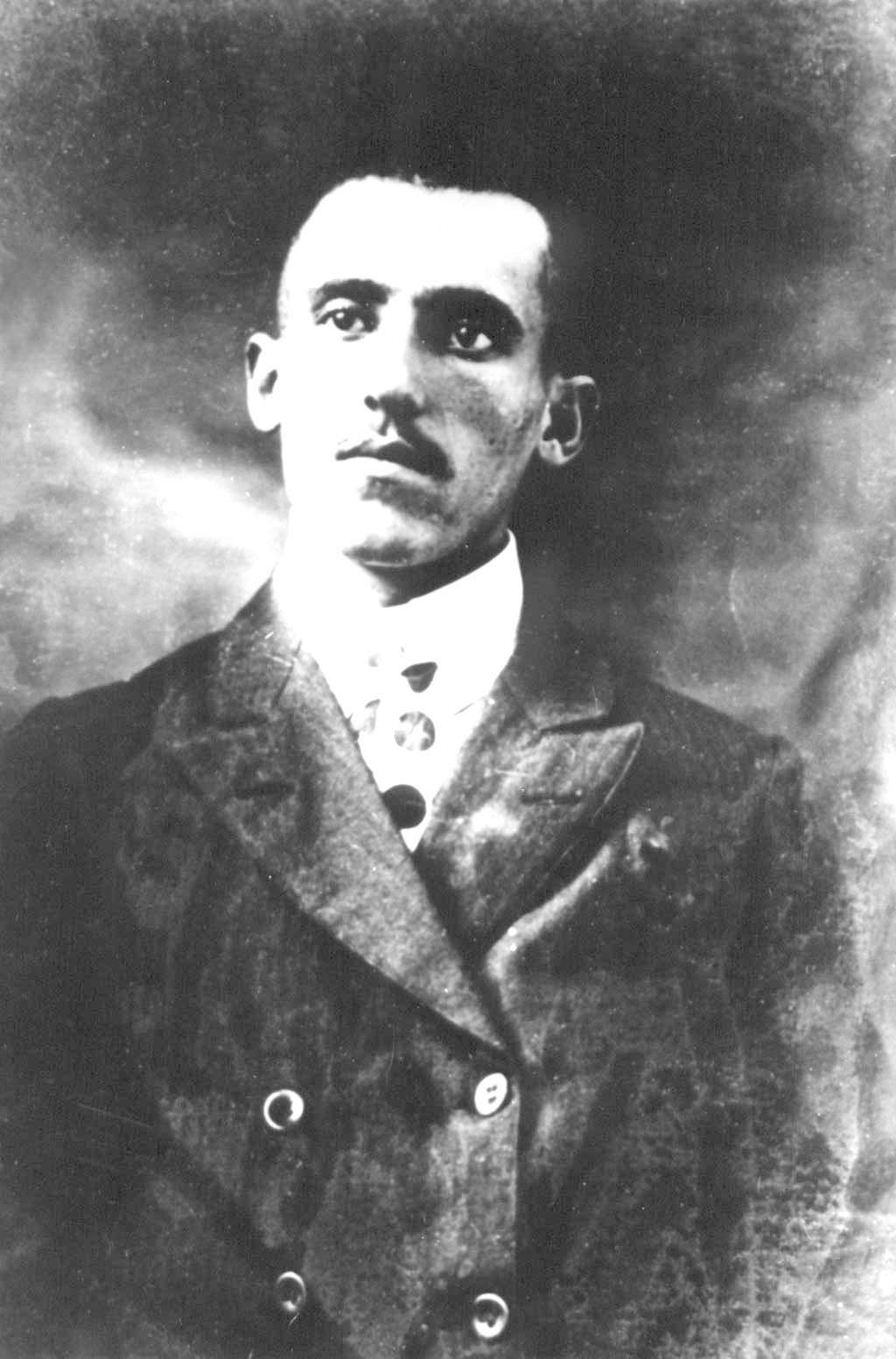
Simón Radowitzky

== Major clashes with police ==
In 1909, police fired on a May Day demonstration in the Plaza Lorea in Buenos Aires organized by FORA. Several workers were killed. The anarchists responded by declaring a general strike leading the government to shut down the workers' centers and arrest 2,000 people. This strike lasted nine days. As the Chief of Police Ramón Falcón was widely blamed for the killing, the young Jewish anarchist Simón Radowitzky killed him and his secretary by throwing a bomb at the car they were in on November 13. An unprecedented repression against the anarchist movement ensued. Martial law was declared and remained in place until January 1910. The offices of La Protesta were raided and its machinery destroyed, as were the workers' centers. Within 48 hours thousands were arrested, many sent to Ushuaia prison in Tierra del Fuego. Non-Argentine activists were generally deported.

Although martial law was lifted in January 1910, this year also saw the next major clash between the government and the anarchists. 1910 was the hundredth anniversary of the May Revolution of 1810, which led to Argentine independence. Anarchist agitation was on the rise, a new anarchist daily newspaper, La Batalla, was founded in March, and the FORA planned protests against the Residence Law, but was somewhat hesitant as it scented a lack of militancy among workers. The moderate syndicalist Argentine Regional Workers' Confederation (CORA), the successor of the General Workers' Union, however, pushed for confrontation and the anarchists were forced to follow suit. They threatened to call for a general strike on May 25, the day of the anniversary festivities. Therefore, the government once again declared martial law on May 13. Police arrested the editors of La Protesta and La Batalla and FORA leaders. Meanwhile, right-wing militant youths attacked union offices and workers' clubs while the police ignored or even encouraged them. Because of this, the general strike was moved to May 18, but it was suppressed by the police and the right-wing militants. 1910 also saw the sentencing of Simón Radowitzky. As a minor, he could not be sentenced to death, so he was condemned to life in Ushuaia. He would be pardoned and released from prison in 1930.

Argentine anarchist historian Ángel Cappelletti reports that in Argentina "Among the workers that came from Europe in the 2 first decades of the century, there was curiously some stirnerian individualists influenced by the philosophy of Nietzsche, that saw syndicalism as a potential enemy of anarchist ideology. They established...affinity groups that in 1912 came to, according to Max Nettlau, to the number of 20. In 1911 there appeared, in Colón, the periodical El Único, that defined itself as 'Publicación individualista'".

== FORA split ==
The events of 1909 and 1910 left the Argentine anarchists fatigued. The movement's growth stalled as a result of state repression and the country's economic problems. The Law of Social Defense, passed as a reaction to the Falcón assassination, allowed the government to deny any foreigner who committed crimes punishable under Argentine law entry into the country, prohibited the entry of anarchists, banned groups disseminating anarchist propaganda, and granted local authorities the power to prohibit any public meetings which subversive ideas could be expressed at.

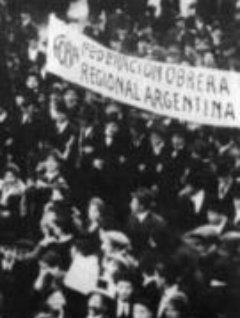
FORA demonstration around 1915

Meanwhile, the moderate syndicalist CORA grew in size as a result of its pragmatic approach, which included participating in negotiations with employers in place of direct action as advocated by the anarchists. Striving for labor unity, the CORA set up a fusion committee with some non-affiliated unions to push for a merger with the FORA. The majority of the FORA agreed, calling for the CORA to abolish itself and enter the FORA. At the April 1915 FORA congress, its ninth, a resolution which reversed its commitment to anarchist communism was passed, paving the way for the CORA unions to join. Only a minority in the FORA rejected this move. After the congress, this minority started a breakaway federation under the name FORA V, referring to the fifth congress, which the resolution for anarcho-communism was passed at. While the FORA IX had somewhere between 100,000 and 120,000 members, the anarchist FORA V had 10,000 at the most, though both figures are considered unreliable. The FORA V was strongest in the interior of the country, where most of the workers were native Argentines.

With the start of World War I in 1914, the conditions for the anarchist movement became even more unfavorable. The falling of wages and a net migration back to Europe created poor premises for any kind of labor activism and the anarchist FORA V struggled to adapt to this. After a railworkers' strike broke out in October 1917, the anarchists called for a futile general strike and received little support from the FORA IX. A meat-packers' strike in Berisso and Avellaneda led by the anarchists was defeated in 1918.

== Semana Trágica and Patagonia Rebelde ==
In December 1918, a strike broke out at the Vasena metalworks in the Buenos Aires suburbs of Nueva Pompeya. The union leading the strike was a splinter from FORA IX and called itself anarchist, though its links to FORA V were tenuous. On January 7, 1919, a shootout between strikers and police, troops, and firemen killed five. The police and troops then attacked the 200,000 workers at the funeral procession on killing at least thirty-nine and injuring many more. After the events of January 7, the FORA V immediately called for a general strike, but the work stoppage that followed was more of a result of the workers' outrage over the killings than of the anarchists' call. The general strike took place on January 11 to 12, but then subsided. Once again, the police, the military, and right-wing groups reacted with pogroms in working-class neighborhoods. Right-wing militants created the Argentine Patriotic League. The Jewish inhabitants of the workers' quarters especially became the victims of the attacks. In all, somewhere between 100 and 700 people died and around 4,000 were injured. The Semana Trágica further perpetuated the decline of Argentine anarchism. From around 1920 on, the anarchists' influence in the trade unions was rather minor.

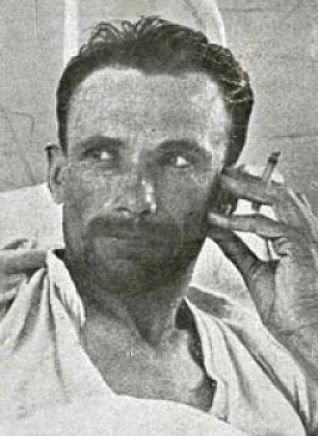
Kurt Gustav Wilckens

From 1920 to 1922, there was a ranch hand uprising in Patagonia led by anarchists. The army, led by Colonel Héctor Benigno Varela, reacted by executing some 1,500 people. Because of the remoteness of the region, the events did not become known in Buenos Aires at first. Once they did, the anarchist movement started a campaign against the "butcher of Patagonia", as they called Varela. This led the Tolstoyan anarchist Kurt Gustav Wilckens to assassinate the colonel on January 23, 1923.

The movement's decline continued nevertheless. It was intensified by both strife within the movement and government persecution.

The rise of Argentine pistolero in the 1920s saw an increase in bombings and expropriations, though denounced by other anarchist leaders. Anarchists like Miguel Roscigna and Severino Di Giovanni engaged in expropriations affiliated with the criminal world to fund the social revolution, publishing, and political prisoners. Expropriative anarchism peaked in the late 1920s and was suppressed after the 1930 military coup.

== Infamous Decade and Perón government ==
On September 6, 1931, José Félix Uriburu came to power in Argentina via a coup d'état starting a series of military governments known as the Infamous Decade. The anarchist FORA, the sole FORA since the FORA IX was renamed as the Argentine Syndicates' Union (USA) in 1922, went underground immediately. A number of distributors of La Protesta were arrested or killed within a year of Uriburu's ascension to power. Deciding it had become impossible to distribute the paper, the publishers of La Protesta ceased making it and disseminated an underground newspaper named Rebelión instead. After martial law was lifted in 1932, La Protesta, the anarchist weekly La Antorcha, and FORA unions in Santa Fe and Rosario published a manifesto called "Eighteen Months of Military Terror" about the repression they had endured. In this year the second Regional Anarchist Conference was held in Rosario - the first having taken place in Buenos Aires in 1922. It had been planned by anarchists imprisoned under Uriburu. The congress set up a regional committee for anarchist co-ordination, which eventually led to the founding of the Argentine Anarcho-Communist Federation (FACA) in 1935.

The Spanish Civil War, which broke out in 1936, was an important topic for the Argentine anarchists. Various anarchists left to fight in the war and the FACA's official newspaper Acción Libertaria published special editions dedicated to it.

In 1946, President Juan Perón came to power. With the emergence of Peronism, more and more labor unions (especially the socialist ones) became Peronist, and anarchist unions - which had already suffered a significant decline during the previous decade - lost all of their remaining strength. The anarchist representation in the labor movement became minimal. When Peronism became the mainstream ideology of the Argentine working people, it replaced the old mainstream labor ideologies (including anarchism, socialism and communism), which never again regained their old importance among the working class. FORA, the traditional anarchist union, was closed as a result of this. In 1952, following the imprisonment and torture of several FORA members, anarchists of all factions launched a campaign to inform the public of this situation. After the violent coup that overthrew Perón in 1955, anarchist periodicals reappeared openly once again, among them La Protesta and Acción Libertaria. However, Argentine anarchism could never recover as a movement with popular roots.

== More recent developments ==
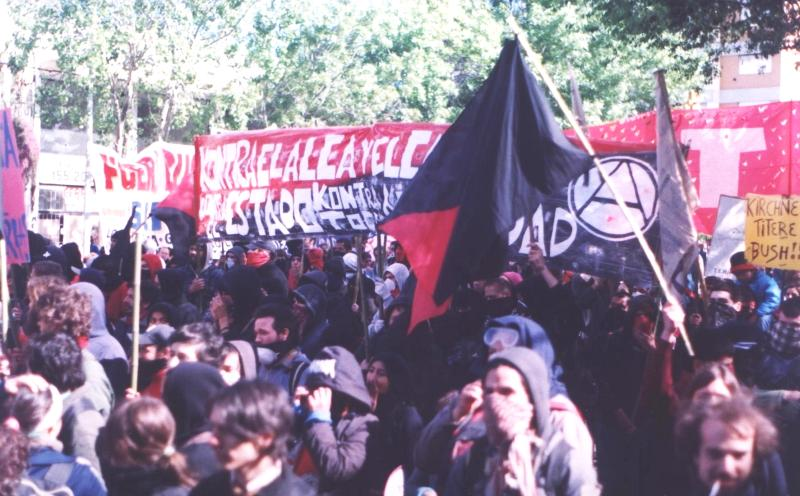
Anarchist protest against capitalist neo-liberalism, Argentina

The FACA became the Argentine Libertarian Federation (FLA) in 1955, but like its predecessor organization was never able to gain a mass following. In 1985, the FLA replaced its newspaper Acción Libertaria with a new political journal called El Libertario.

The Rosario-based Columna Libertaria Joaquin Penina celebrated May Day in 2008.

In 2010, the Anarchist-Communist Federation of Argentina (FACA) was established by 3 groups: the Columna Libertaria Joaquin Penina from Rosario, the Columna Libertaria Errico Malatesta from the city of Buenos Aires, and the Columna Libertaria Buenaventura Durruti from the west of the Greater Buenos Aires. Its main fronts of public social struggles were the unionized and the unemployed worker movements. Its ideology was revolutionary socialist and specifism. Although it shares the name with an anarchist organization from the 1930s, it's not considered as a continuation of it. Its public appearances emphasize the comeback of a "committed social anarchism."

== See also ==
- Category:Argentine anarchists
- List of anarchist movements by region
- Horizontalidad
- Socialism in Argentina
- December 2001 riots in Argentina
- FaSinPat
- Brukman factory
- Hotel Bauen

== Bibliography ==
- Colombo, Eduardo (1971), "Anarchism in Argentina and Uruguay", in Apter, David E.; Joll, James (eds.), Anarchism Today, Garden City, New York: Anchor Books, pp. 211–244.
- Morse, Chuck (2009). "Anarchism, Argentina". In Ness, Immanuel (ed.). The International Encyclopedia of Revolution and Protest. Oxford: John Wiley & Sons. pp. 1–5. doi:10.1002/9781405198073.wbierp0040. ISBN 978-1-4051-9807-3.
- Oved, Yaacov (1997). "The Uniqueness of Anarchism in Argentina". Estudios Interdisciplinarios de América Latina y el Caribe. 8 (1). Tel Aviv: University of Tel Aviv. doi:10.61490/eial.v8i1.1126. ISSN 0792-7061. OCLC 25122634.
- Simon, S. Fanny (February 1946). "Anarchism and Anarcho-Syndicalism in South America". The Hispanic American Historical Review. 26 (1). Durham: Duke University Press: 38–59. doi:10.2307/2507692. ISSN 0018-2168. JSTOR 2507692.
- Thompson, Ruth (1985). "The Limitations of Ideology in the Early Argentine Labour Movement: Anarchism in the Trade Unions, 1890—1920". Journal of Latin American Studies. 16 (1): 81–99. doi:10.1017/S0022216X00004041. ISSN 0022-216X. S2CID 154931932.
- Thompson, Ruth (1990), "Argentine Syndicalism: Reformism before Revolution", in van der Linden, Marcel; Thorpe, Wayne (eds.), Revolutionary Syndicalism: an International Perspective, Aldershot: Scolar Press, pp. 167–183, ISBN 0-85967-815-6
