= Tenants' strike of 1907 =

Tenants’ strike of 1907
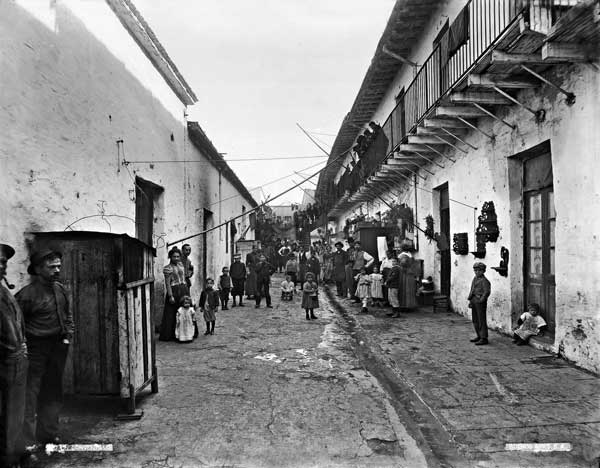
- Conventillo of Buenos Aires
- Date: August - October 1907
- Location: Argentina. Buenos Aires and other Argentine cities
- Caused by: Rise in rental prices, low wages
- Goals: Eight-hour day, better housing conditions, reversal of the rent increase, salary increases
- Methods: Rent strike
- Result: Strike suppressed

Parties
Tenants; Socialists; Anarchists: FORA	Government: National Autonomist Party; Federal Police

Lead figures
Miguel Pepe †	José Figueroa Alcorta; Ramón Falcón

The Tenants' Strike or Broom Strike of 1907 was a popular movement against the rise in rents in tenant houses in the city of Buenos Aires and other Argentine cities, popularly called conventillos. The strike began in August 1907, it lasted approximately 3 months and more than one hundred tenants participated in the movement, with thirty-two thousand workers on strike. It had a significant presence of anarchist and socialist activists.

The conflict went far beyond the narrow image of a simple "tenement house riot" and became one of the first large-scale urban strikes in Argentina. It brought together demands for decent housing, criticism of real-estate speculation, and new forms of collective action in urban space. A distinctive feature of the movement was the marked participation of women, which gave it particular characteristics. Women, who were mainly responsible for domestic organization and daily life in the tenement houses, took on a central role both in coordinating the protests and in resisting judicial and police authorities and the owners of the buildings.

== Background ==
=== Argentina at the beginning of the 20th century ===
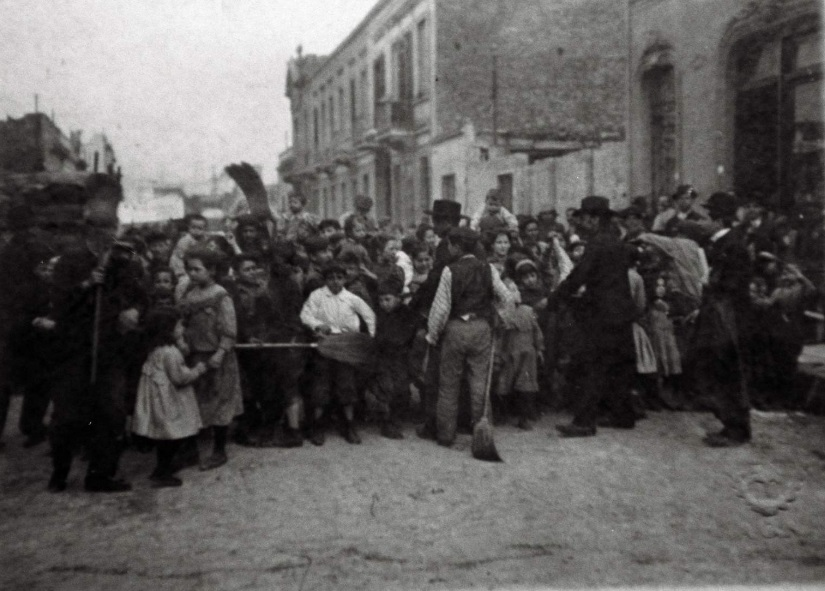
Tenant strike in Buenos Aires in 1907. March of the Brooms through La Boca.

Agro-exporting Argentina, sustained by an open economy, formed its market and its nation-state around 1880. It became a country that received foreign capital and massive immigration, mainly Italians and Spanish people, who arrived in search of living and working conditions that were non-existent in Europe at the time, giving rise to a growing urbanization process.

Between 1895 and 1905, the vegetative growth of the City of Buenos Aires reached 52.5%, and total migration was 65.5%, 51.8% of which belonged to non-natives. For 1900, it was calculated that the migratory balance was about 50,485 people, and, in 1907, the figure practically doubled, reaching 119,861 people.

The city drew newly arrived immigrants, many of whom settled as tenants or laborers in the surrounding rural areas, while others moved into the capital itself to take part in its economic life. After In 1890, the growth of the population aggravated the housing problem in popular sectors of the city. Buenos Aires spread to the periphery, forming new neighborhoods, but most of them settled in conventillo houses, which proliferated.

Growth in the number of tenement houses and inhabitants between 1880 and 1907
Year	Tenement houses	Rooms	Inhabitants	Inhabitants/room
1880	1,770	24,023	51,915	2.2
1883	1,868	25,645	64,156	2.5
1887	2,835	n/d	116,167	n/d
1895	2,249	37,603	94,743	2.5
1905	2,297	38,405	129,257	3.4
1907	2,500	n/d	150,000	n/d

The conventillo became the most usual and characteristic form of workers' lodging. In 1904, the municipal census showed that there were 11.5 people per house in the Capital Federal, almost all of them single-storey. The statistics reported that of the city's 950,891 inhabitants, 138,188 lived in the 43,873 rooms that made up the 2,462 tenement houses of Buenos Aires. That is, more than 10% of the population was housed in tenement houses.

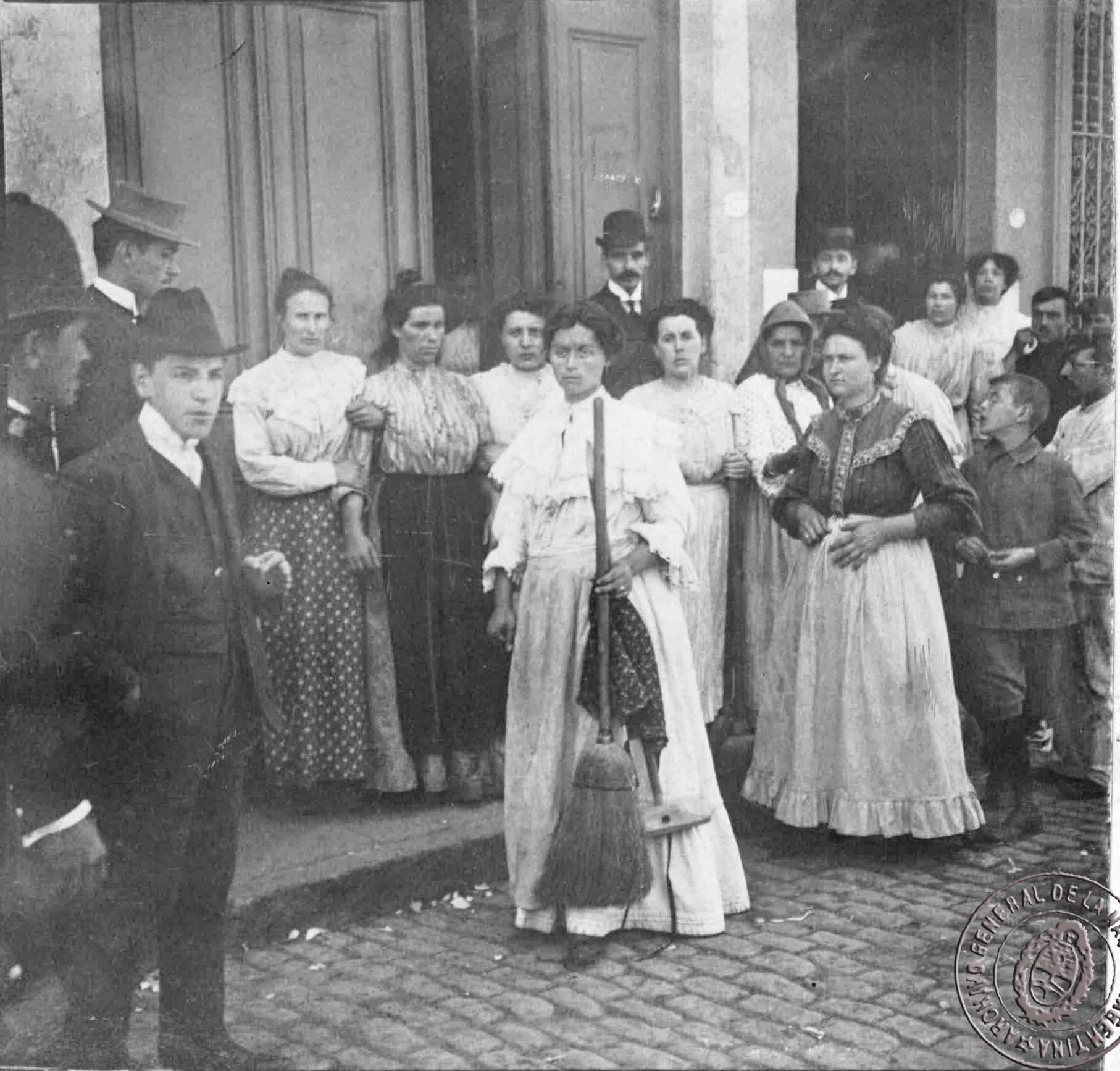
Tenant strike.

From 1905, rents maintained an upward trend, and, by 1907, the price of a room was triple that of 1870. "The costs of humble rooms were eight times higher than in Paris and London."

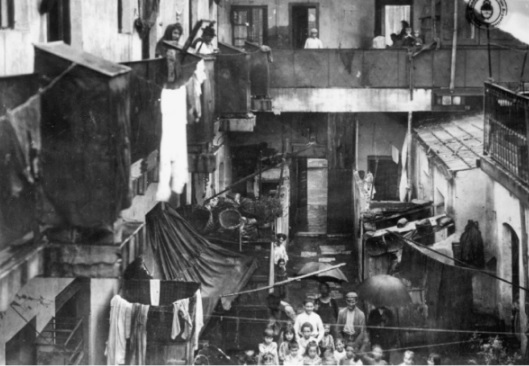
Tenement house strike.

=== Living conditions in the tenements ===
In 1900 the Conventillos used to have a cement patio, bathrooms and some showers. Between 20 and 70 people had a single latrine to attend to their needs and "the ammonia fumes that escape inside make those who enter them experience discomfort and tears." The rooms were small in size, with little ventilation or windowless, where up to 10 people lived.

The room in a central house cost around 20 pesos at least and could go up from 5 to 7 pesos more with a window facing the street, constituting a substantial part of the workers' budget.

In 1890, the tenants organized a commission for the first time to take action against the landlords. The movement failed but resurfaced three years later from the attempt to form a "League Against Rentals", although general indifference ended up dissolving it. In any case, the almost constant rise in rents generated, in 1905, the unusual joint proposal of anarchists, socialists and trade unionists who wrote a manifesto to propose the formation of a league against the high cost of living, although it did not materialize.

During the strike, women used brooms as a symbol of their work as housewives and to defend themselves against the police.

From then on, and through the action of subcommittees, propaganda and conferences, the preaching against the almost continuous rise in rents and tax charges that decimated the wages of the workers was intensified.

== Strike of 1907 ==
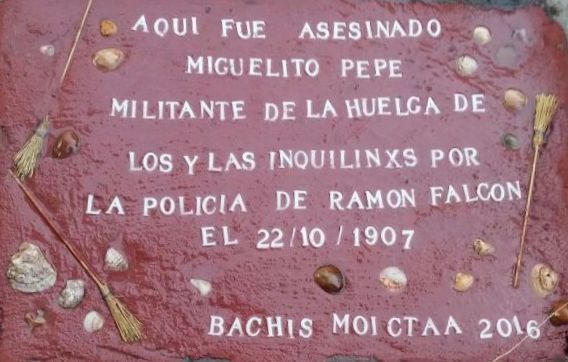
Tile in tribute to Miguel Pepe, the strike's only fatal victim, 1907.

In 1906 the Argentine Regional Workers Federation (FORA) led the campaign for the reduction of rents and formed the League of Struggle against High Rents and Taxes. In August 1907, through a municipal decree, there was a tax increase which was transferred to the price of the rooms located in the tenements. In this context, the tenement house on Calle Ituzaingó went on strike, refusing to pay the rent. The strikers formed a central committee in search of new adhesions, reduction of work to 8 hours a day and a salary increase.

The movement organized itself through a propaganda and agitation committee that quickly sought support from other collective dwellings and workers' organizations, and made contact with committees in other neighborhoods. By October 1904, there were around 500 tenement houses that had joined, located not only near the center of Buenos Aires but also in Avellaneda, Lomas de Zamora, La Plata, Mar del Plata, and Bahía Blanca. Tenement houses in Rosario also joined, and before long more than 2,000 dwellings were on strike across the country.

As a consequence of the repression, on 22 October the anarchist militant Miguel Pepe was killed by the police under the orders of the chief of the Capital Police, Ramón Falcón, who, in 1909, would himself be killed by an anarchist militant of Ukrainian origin named Simón Radowitzky.

Between October and November, the State responded with mass evictions, in which the police and security forces took part. In addition, the Residence Law was applied to deport foreign militants, particularly figures linked to anarchism, in an attempt to dismantle the movement's political leadership.

The evictions brought the cycle of the strike to a close and, despite the strong mark the confrontation left on the history of social struggles, the cost of rents continued to represent a high proportion of workers' incomes.

The tenants' strike was one of the most important events of its time, marking a turning point in later struggles for the right to housing in Argentina.

== March of the Brooms ==
One of the first public demonstrations of the protest was the March of the Brooms, held in the streets of La Boca and organized by a conventillo house in the area. It was a large demonstration made up mostly of children who beat the brooms they used at home to, among other things, "sweep out the landlords" of the tenement houses. The children marched through the streets of La Boca accompanied by their mothers, making their voices heard and gathering support along the way.

It was the brooms of the women of the Strike Committee of another tenement house, located on San Juan Street, that blocked the entrance door, forming a cordon of resistance to stand up to the police forces sent by Colonel Falcón and thus prevent the eviction.

The March of the Brooms became one of the most representative symbols of the conflict, both for its symbolic originality and for the active participation of women in the day-to-day organization of the strike. Carrying brooms made visible the role of the women of the tenement houses in defending their homes and in leading the protest. The use of a domestic object such as the broom turned an everyday item into an emblem of collective resistance.

== International dimension ==
The tenants' strike was not an isolated episode. Similar protest actions took place in Montevideo, Chile, Rio de Janeiro, Mexico, Glasgow, and even New York. In the case of Mexico, for example, 1922 was a particularly active year, with disputes declared in Veracruz, the capital, Guadalajara, and Mérida. A notable feature of these experiences is that they reached their greatest intensity in port cities, spaces that received major migratory flows and where, as a result, pressure on the housing market and the mismatch between housing supply and population growth became especially acute.

However, few protest movements of the period achieved the wide public and media impact that the 1907 tenants' strike gained. The centrality this episode achieved can be explained by two main factors: while the immediate demand was aimed at reducing rents, the protest incorporated demands linked to improving the living conditions of a significant part of the urban population, with a direct impact on public hygiene problems, an issue repeatedly discussed in the press. Added to this was the marked participation of women in the organization and leadership of the movement, which gave the conflict distinctive features and won it sympathy among different social sectors.

== See also ==
- 1931 Barcelona rent strike

== Bibliography ==
- Suriano, Juan (1983). La huelga de inquilinos de 1907 [The Tenants' Strike of 1907] (in Spanish). Buenos Aires: CEAL.
- Girbal-Blacha, Noemí M. La huelga de inquilinos de 1907 en Buenos Aires [The 1907 Tenants' Strike in Buenos Aires] (in Spanish). Buenos Aires.
- Rey, Ana Lía (1904). Imágenes de la huelga de inquilinos en Buenos Aires [Photos of the tenants' strike in Buenos Aires] (in Spanish).
- Ramos, Jorge (1999). Arquitectura del habitar popular en Buenos Aires: el conventillo [Architecture of Working-Class Housing in Buenos Aires: The Conventillo] (in Spanish).
