= Miguel Arcángel Roscigna =

Argentine blacksmith and anarchist (1891–1936)

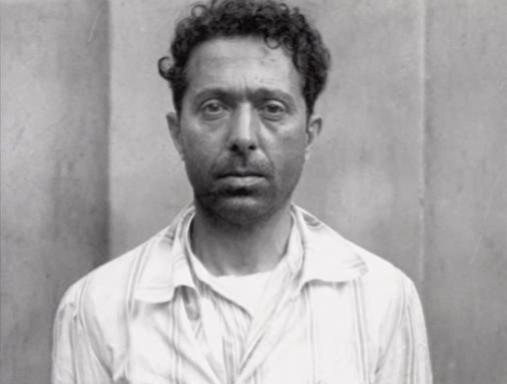
- Born: 1891; Buenos Aires, Argentina
- Died: 1936 (aged 44–45)
- Movement: Expropriative anarchism
- Partner: Victoria Romano

Miguel Arcángel Roscigna (1891–1936) was a blacksmith, politician, fugitive, and a militant Argentine anarchist who was notable for his activity in Argentine expropriative anarchism.

== Biography ==
The son of Italian immigrants, Roscigna became a member of the Unión de Sindicatos Argentinos, (Union of Argentine Syndicates) and had deemed current legal actions as insufficient for the release of prisoners, Roscigna decided towards a more violent approach: expropriative anarchism. In November 1918 he got a job as warden at the Ushuaia Prison in an attempt to facilitate the escape of Simon Radowitzky, another anarchist who was serving a sentence for the assassination of Federal Police Chief Ramon Falcon. Roscigna was eventually exposed, and although Radowitzky managed to break away initially, he was later captured and returned to jail.

In 1926 Rosigna became associated with other prominent anarchist such as the Spaniards Francisco Ascaso, Alejandro Ascaso, Gregorio Jover and Andrés Vázquez Paredes, and the Argentines Emilio Uriondo and the Moretti brothers (Antonio and Vicente), who formed a gang that carried out a series of violent bank heists and robberies. The Spaniards were part of a group of exilee anarchists known as Los Errantes, led by top militant Buenaventura Durruti. On 19 January 1926, they seized a bounty of 64,000 pesos from the chapter of the Banco Provincia in San Martín; a clerk was killed and another wounded when trying to escape. Shortly after, Roscigna was briefly held in prison as a suspect of other crimes and bombings, but was eventually released for lack of evidence. On 1 October 1927 the target was the paymaster of Rawson Hospital, in Buenos Aires; a policeman who attempted to intervene was also shot and killed. The gang got 141,000 pesos from this robbery. Roscigna and the Morettis fled to Uruguay by boat.

Once in Montevideo, Roscigna funded a money counterfeit scheme with the cash obtained from the band's misdeeds. The fake money was printed by Erwin Poltke, a German anarchist, in the very prison of Punta Carretas where he was serving a sentence. The plan of Roscigna was to use Montevideo as a safe heaven for activities in Argentina, therefore he tried to persuade fellow anarchists from carrying out attacks in Uruguay. The Moretti brothers, however, now partnered with three Catalan anarchists, began to operate on their own. On 25 October 1928, the group committed an infamous robbery at the currency exchange "Messina" in downtown Montevideo. Three people lost their lives, as the gunmen got 4,000 Uruguayan pesos. A whistblower betrayed the Moretti gang, and about 300 policemen and Uruguayan Army soldiers stormed their hideout. Four were arrested, while Antonio Moretti took his own life after burning the stolen cash.

Roscigna participated in the February 1929 assault on the Kloeckner establishments in Buenos Aires. Subsequently, in October 1930, amidst the repressive climate of the Uriburu dictatorship, he collaborated with the Italian anarchist Severino Di Giovanni in the robbery of the Obras Sanitarias paymaster in the neighborhood of Palermo. The proceeds amounted to 280,000 pesos. Miguel Arcángel Roscigna traveled back to Montevideo to finance a plan for the escape of Antonio Moretti, several Catalan anarchists, and other incarcerated comrades.

== Capture, prison time, and aftermath ==
Roscigna joined forces with other anarchists like Vázquez Paredes, José Manuel "Captain" Paz, Fernando Malvicini and Gino Gatti to organize the liberation of their companions from jail. Gatti and his family bought a coal store near the prison of Punta Carretas and became a prosperous and respectable businessman before suddenly closing the establishment down and moving to Buenos Aires. The commercial premises were actually a screen for Roscigna and the others, who dug a tunnel linking the store to the bathroom of the prison. The break out took place on 18 March 1931; the four convicts of the "Messina"'s heist plus another five inmates vanished in the dark. The convicts and their "liberators" were eventually caught by the police barely nine days later, when a former inmate, now a dogcatcher officer, recognized one of them.

After serving six years of prison in Montevideo, Roscigna was handed over to Argentine authorities: he disappeared while in custody in 1936 along with another two anarchists. They were presumably shot dead by Argentine Federal Police members and their bodies thrown to the Rio de la Plata.

== See also ==
- Illegalism
- List of people who disappeared mysteriously (1910–1970)
- Enforced disappearance
