= Descamisado =

Spanish term, usually referring to the revolutionary Spanish masses

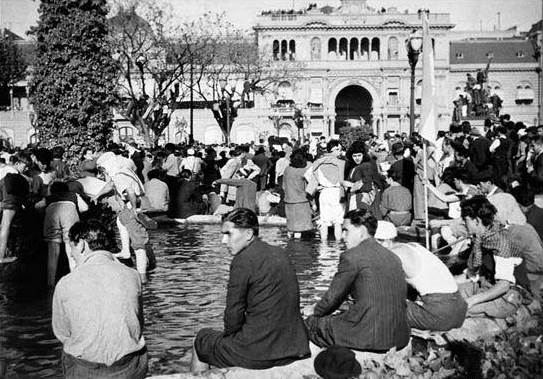
- Photo of Juan Perón's supporters in Plaza de Mayo on Loyalty Day, 1945. His supporters were known as "Descamisados"
- Origin: Les Misérables
- Context: Trienio Liberal
- Coined by: Victor Hugo
- Meaning: lit. Shirtless

Descamisado (Spanish pronunciation: [deskamiˈsaðo]) is a Spanish word that literally means "without shirt" or "shirtless".

== History ==
The term was originally used by the narrator in Victor Hugo's seminal 1862 novel Les Misérables to refer to the revolutionary Spanish masses. Following the defeat of Napoleon Bonaparte at the Battle of Waterloo, the French (Bourbon) monarchy was restored to power. The Bourbons acted to prop up the Spanish monarchy against the popular forces of the Spanish social revolution in the Spanish War of 1823. Hugo's character is commenting on the use of the term by the supporters of the French Bourbons. The word was used pejoratively and in direct comparison to the derogative term applied to the French popular masses, the sans-culottes of the French bourgeoisie revolution of 1789.

In the 20th century, it was also used as an insult by the elite of Argentina to describe the followers of Juan Perón, who served as president of Argentina from 1946 until 1955, and then again briefly from 1973 to 1974. The term was later reclaimed as a term of pride, with Juan Perón and his wife Eva Perón affectionately referring to their followers as "descamisados". During his 1945 campaign for president, Juan Perón toured the country on a train that he named El Descamisado.

The first usage of the term in the history of Argentina dates back to the 19th century. Tomás de Iriarte described in his memories a time when he was walking with Carlos María de Alvear and found Manuel Dorrego with dirty and torn clothes. Iriarte wrote that "Excusado es decir que esto era estudiado para captarse la multitud, los descamisados." ("Needless to say, this was planned to captivate the multitude, the shirtless.") El Descamisado was also the name of an anarchist newspaper in Buenos Aires, Argentina.

By most accounts, the term has its modern origins on October 17, 1945, when thousands of supporters of Juan Perón gathered in front of the Casa Rosada making a demonstration to demand Perón's release from prison. While waiting for Perón on this hot day, many men in the crowd removed their shirts—hence the term "shirtless". However, there is much debate among scholars with regard to the origins of the label. Some claim that the word was coined to describe the working poor, the social class from which Perón drew the greatest amount of his political backing. The descamisados of Peronism have occasionally been compared to the sans-culottes of the French Revolution. This segment of the population was able to join the ranks of the middle class thanks to mass access to healthcare and education opportunities and the process of industrialisation that took place in Argentina during the first two terms of Juan Perón's presidency (1946–1955).

In 1989, Fernando Collor de Mello in his presidential campaign used descamisados and pés descalços ("shoeless") to refer to the poor people.

== See also ==
- Roto
