= UGT =

UGT may mean:

- União Geral de Trabalhadores, the General Union of Workers (Portugal)
- Unión General de Trabajadores, the General Workers' Union (Argentina)
- Unión General de Trabajadores, the General Union of Workers of Spain.
- Uridinediphosphate-glucuronosyltransferase, a class of enzymes including UGT2B7, UGT1, and UGT1A1.
- Universal Greeting Time, an Internet Relay Chat convention whereby a person who joins a conversation is greeted "Good morning" and a person who leaves is bidden "Good night", regardless of the time zones of participants.
