= Red Week =

Red Week may refer to:

- Red Week (Argentina), a week-long general strike in 1909 in Buenos Aires
- Red Week (Chile), week of riots in Santiago that evolved from a protest on meat tariffs
- Red Week (Italy), a week of labor riots that occurred June 1914 in Italy
- Red Week (Netherlands), an unsuccessful revolution that occurred November 1918 in the Netherlands
- Red Week (Aid to the Church in Need), an annual global event to highlight the persecution of Christians
