= Red Week (Argentina) =

1909 general strike in Argentina

- Part of the labor movement in Argentina
- Date: 1–7 May 1909
- Location: Buenos Aires, Argentina
- Caused by: Police brutality
- Goals: Release of political prisoners; Reopening of trade union meeting spaces; Repeal of anti-union legislation; Resignation of Ramón Lorenzo Falcón.
- Methods: General strike, political demonstrations
- Result: Strike ended: Political prisoners released; Union meeting spaces reopened.

Parties
Argentine Regional Workers' Federation; General Workers' Union	Government of Argentina: Argentine Federal Police; Argentine Army; National Autonomist Party

Lead figures
Joint strike committee	José Figueroa Alcorta; Marco Aurelio Avellaneda; Ramón Lorenzo Falcón

Number
c. 250,000 workers	5,000 soldiers; 2 artillery regiments; 3 cavalry regiments; 6 infantry battalions; 2 engineer battalions; 1,500 cadets

Casualties and losses
11 killed; 140 injured; Hundreds arrested	Unknown

The Red Week (Spanish: Semana Roja) was a general strike in Argentina, in May 1909. After police attacked an International Workers' Day demonstration, killing a number of the demonstrators, a coalition of the anarchist Argentine Regional Workers' Federation (FORA) and socialist General Workers' Union (UGT) declared a general strike. Their demands were the release of all political prisoners who were arrested during the demonstration, and the reopening of their meeting spaces, which the police had shut down. The UGT also demanded the resignation of police chief Ramón Lorenzo Falcón, although the FORA refused to accept the demand due to their anti-statism. The government attempted to quell the unrest by mobilising the Argentine Federal Police and even calling in the Argentine Army. After a week of strike actions, the government agreed to the negotiations and accepted the FORA's demands. Although he never resigned, Falcón was later assassinated by the anarchist Simón Radowitzky.

== Background ==
Argentina gained its independence from the Spanish Empire in 1810, and over the course of the 19th century, the Argentine working class slowly grew in strength. At the time, Argentine workers worked long hours for low wages, and endured poor working and living conditions. Industry had not yet developed beyond small workshops, so most workers were employed in the agricultural and shipping sectors, and trade unions struggled to gain a substantial foothold. Political corruption and clientelism was also endemic under the rule of the National Autonomist Party, leading to the growth of a liberal opposition in the Radical Civic Union, while high levels of political repression provoked regular demonstrations in demand of civil liberties.

During the Baring crisis of the 1890s, when Argentina experienced a period of great economic instability, trade unions grew in strength and strike actions became increasingly common. This culminated in the establishment of the Argentine Regional Workers' Federation (FORA), which led the Argentine labor movement through a series of general strikes during the 1900s, against rising levels of political repression. To combat the growing trade union movement, the government of Julio Argentino Roca introduced the Residence Law (Spanish: Ley de Residencia), which allowed the state to deport foreign trade unionists at a time when migrant workers comprised the majority of the Argentine working class.

By the late 1900s, the Argentine labor movement had divided into three factions: anarchists, socialists and syndicalists. The anarchist-led FORA became the country's predominant trade union federation, while the socialist-aligned General Workers' Union (UGT) held a significant minority of trade union affiliates.

== Red Week ==
=== International Workers' Day ===
On International Workers' Day, 1 May 1909, the FORA called a demonstration in the Plaza Lorea, with plans to carry out a march through the city centre. People began to gather in the plaza in the early afternoon; many of the demonstrators were migrant workers from Catalonia, Italy and Ukraine. By 14:00, the plaza was packed with thousands of people chanting slogans, singing revolutionary songs and waving red flags. According to police, the Luz al soldado anarchist group began attacking businesses that had not shut down for the day, smashing windows and accosting public transit drivers.

As the demonstration made its way out of the plaza and down the Avenida de Mayo, police chief Ramón Lorenzo Falcón arrived to direct the suppression of the march, which further agitated the demonstrators. After the procession had made its way to Avenida Rivadavia, Falcón ordered the police to attack. A cavalry charge trampled many protestors, while some of the police began shooting into the crowd. By the time the police had dispersed the demonstration, they had killed 5-10 people and wounded 40-70 more. Ambulances then moved the dead and wounded off the streets, while firefighters cleaned away the blood. Among the dead were three Spaniards (Miguel Bech, Manuel Fernández and José Silva) and two Argentines (Luis Pantaleone and Juan Semino), and the wounded were almost entirely migrant workers. The police noted that, although the "Russians" (Note: In Argentina at the time, Jewish immigrants from the Russian Empire's Pale of Settlement were largely referred to as "Russians" (Spanish: Rusos).) had been mostly well-behaved during the demonstration, some of their manifestoes had allegedly called for killing and looting. The police also reported that they were unable to take a statement from one wounded Jewish worker, Jacobo Besnicoff, as he did not speak Spanish.

While all this had taken place, the UGT were beginning to assemble for their own demonstration, which had been scheduled to take place at the Plaza de la Constitución at 15:00. The route of the demonstration was quickly redirected, as it transformed into a protest against the repression of the anarchist march.

=== General strike ===
In response to the massacre, the anarchist and socialist trade unions issued a joint call for a general strike. In turn, President José Figueroa Alcorta called in more police and even the Army to suppress the labor movement. The authorities subsequently shut down all trade union meeting spaces and arrested hundreds of workers, including 16 of the anarchist trade union leaders. The strike committees then demanded the reopening of their spaces, the release of all imprisoned workers and the repeal of legislation that had limited the right to strike. An additional demand by the workers was the resignation of Falcón, who they held responsible for the massacre; the strike committee itself did not make this an official demand, as the anarchists and syndicalists considered it to imply a recognition of state power. The socialists, although they were the least militant of the factions, were among the most vocal in demanding Falcón's resignation.

Over the subsequent days, hundreds of thousands of workers protested against the May Day massacre, bring roughly half the city's working class population into the streets. The government responded by mobilising the entire police force and 5,000 soldiers with artillery, cavalry, infantry and military engineers. The Casa Rosada was also put under armed guard. On the morning of Monday, 3 May, workers attempted to occupy a steel factory owned by Pedro Vasena, but they were violently pushed back. When the bodies of those workers who had been killed in the massacre were prepared for burial, 5,000 people arrived at the morgue to collect them. Roughly 60,000 people gathered for their funeral. At the time, this was the largest funeral procession in the history of Buenos Aires. On the way to the cemetery, police attacked the procession, wounding 70 people and arresting 120 more. During a socialist demonstration on 4 May, police killed another worker and wounded several more people. Over the subsequent days, police continued reported further arrests of "Russian nihilists".

By 5 May, the economy of Buenos Aires had been completely paralyzed by the strike. The government soon bowed to the pressure, and on 7 May, Senate president Benito Villanueva began mediating negotiations between the government and the strikers. The socialists had insisted on Falcón's resignation as their central demand, and refused to enter negotiations unless the proposal was discussed. But the anarchists and syndicalists pressed forward with the negotiations, securing the release of all political prisoners and the reopening of trade union meeting spaces. The government agreed to the anarchist-syndicalist terms, and the strike was brought to an end. The socialists came to consider the strike a failure, because they had not secured Falcón's resignation, while the syndicalists considered it a success. By the morning of Monday 10 May, the general strike had dissipated and Buenos Aires returned to normality.

== Legacy ==
In Argentine history, the Red Week has been cited as a turning point in the struggle for civil liberties, marking the beginning of a period of intensified repression against trade unions. In 1910, the government introduced a new Law of Social Defense, which allowed the state to imprison workers in Ushuaia for public-order crimes. Falcón was assassinated later in the year by the Ukrainian anarchist Simón Radowitzky. He became a martyr for the Argentine Federal Police, who named their police academy in his honor.

The strike also demonstrated the severe political differences between the different factions of the labor movement, which limited their capacity to influence national politics. The contradiction between the political awareness of the socialists, and the revolutionary sentiments of the syndicalists, went unresolved until the rise of Peronism in the 1940s.

== Bibliography ==
- Bayer, Osvaldo (2012) [1991]. Simon Radowitzky and the People's Justice. Berkeley, California: Elephant Editions. OCLC 1194606388.
- Sartelli, Eduardo (2009). "Argentina, Semana Roja, 1909". In Ness, Immanuel (ed.). International Encyclopedia of Revolution and Protest. pp. 265–267. doi:10.1002/9781405198073.wbierp0124. ISBN 9781405198073.
