= Simón Radowitzky =

Ukrainian-Argentine anarchist (1891–1956)

- סימאָן ראַדאָוויצקי
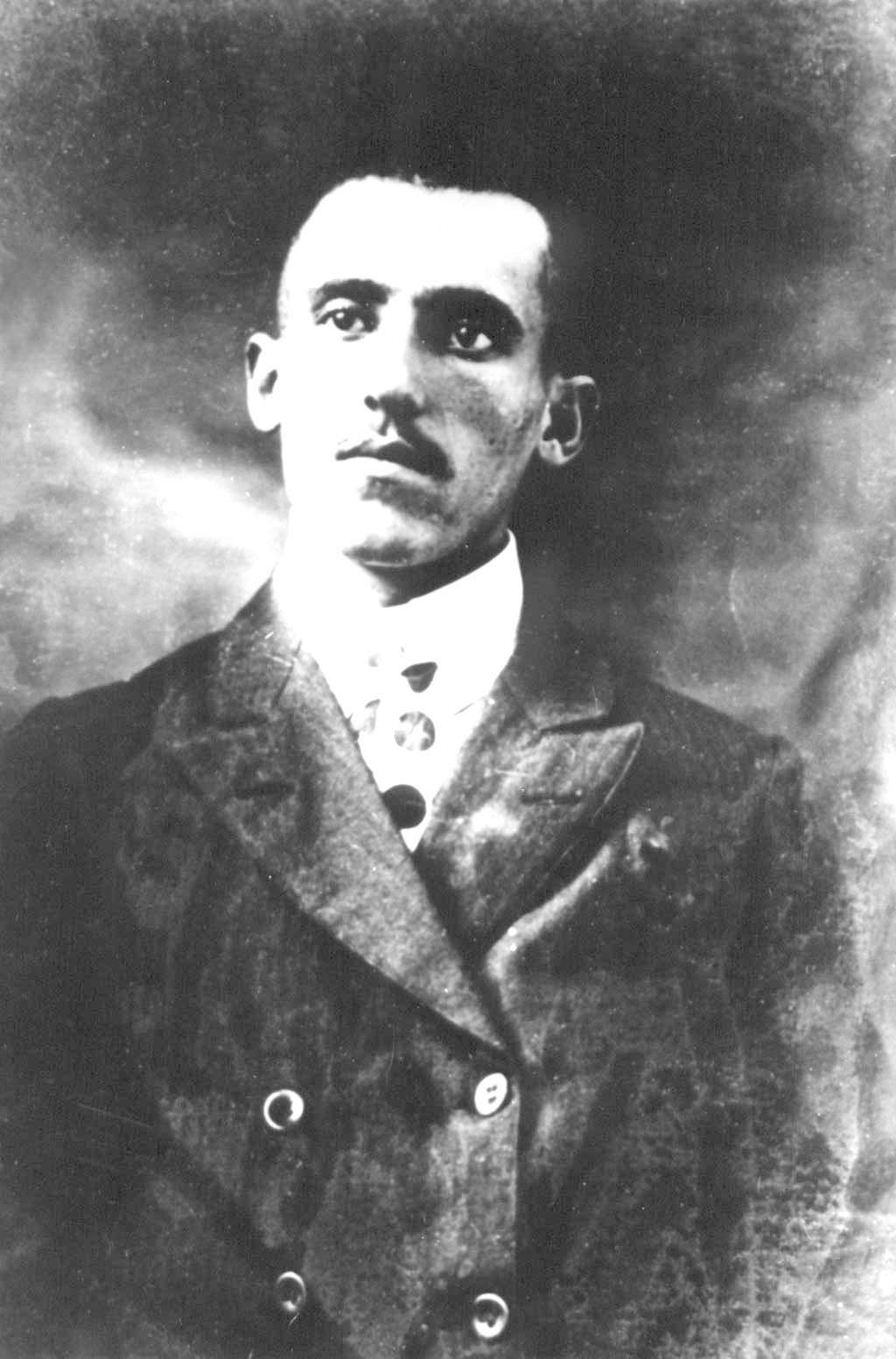
- Radowitzky, c. 1908
- Born: 10 November 1891; Kyiv, Russian Empire
- Died: 4 March 1956 (aged 64); Mexico City, Mexico
- Citizenship: Stateless (until 1941); Mexican (1941–1956)
- Occupation: Mechanic
- Known for: Assassination of Ramón Lorenzo Falcón
- Movement: Anarchism
- Criminal charges: Murder
- Criminal penalty: Indefinite imprisonment
- Criminal status: Pardoned
- Military career
- Allegiance: Spanish Republic
- Service: Spanish Republican Army
- Service years: 1937–1939
- Unit: 28th Division
- Conflicts: Spanish Civil War: Battle of Teruel; Catalonia Offensive

Simón Radowitzky (Yiddish: סימאָן ראַדאָוויצקי; 1891–1956) was a Ukrainian-Argentine anarchist militant, known for his assassination of Buenos Aires police chief Ramón Lorenzo Falcón.

Born into a poor Ukrainian Jewish family, he was radicalised into revolutionary politics from an early age. After being imprisoned for his involvement in the Russian Revolution of 1905, he emigrated to Argentina, where he found work as a mechanic and joined a local Jewish anarchist group. After witnessing a police massacre of workers during the Red Week of 1909, Radowitzky assassinated Falcón, whom he held responsible for the massacre. He admitted to the murder, but as he was a minor, he could not be sentenced to death and was instead imprisoned indefinitely. He was transferred to a prison in Ushuaia, where he spent two decades of his life.

During his imprisonment, he became a representative for his fellow inmates and a rallying figure for the Argentine anarchist movement. By 1930, persistent campaigning for clemency secured Radowitzky's release from prison. He was deported to Uruguay, where he made a new life for himself providing aid to anarchist refugees who were expelled by Argentina's military dictatorship. Radowitzky was again imprisoned in Uruguay under the dictatorship of Gabriel Terra, but after over a year of imprisonment, he was released due to a lack of evidence against him. After the outbreak of the Spanish Civil War, he went to Spain to volunteer. There, he fought in the Battle of Teruel and saved the archives of the National Confederation of Labour (CNT) from the Nationalist advance. After the war, he found asylum in Mexico, where he became a citizen and lived out the rest of his life.

== Biography ==
=== Early life ===
Simón Radowitsky was born in late 1891, (Note: Osvaldo Bayer says he was born on 10 November; Augustin Souchy says 10 September.) in a small shtetl in the Kyiv Governorate of the Russian Empire; he came from a working-class Ukrainian Jewish family. When he was 10 years old, he began working as a blacksmith's apprentice. Radowitzky grew up amid a rising wave of antisemitic violence and heavy political repression by the Okhrana. He became involved in revolutionary politics at a young age and was imprisoned for four months after he was caught distributing political pamphlets. During the 1905 Revolution, he was wounded during a riot in Kyiv and then imprisoned for 6 months for his participation. To avoid being exiled to Siberia, he fled the country.

In March 1908, he emigrated to Argentina. There he went to work as a mechanic, first for the Central Argentine Railway in Campana, then later in Buenos Aires. He ultimately settled there, living in an apartment at 194 Calle Andes. He initially worked at a Jewish-owned metal shop, but a year later, he found a better-paying job at an Italian-owned workshop. He joined a local Jewish anarchist group, Burevéstnik, which was established in May 1908 and sought to spread anarchist ideas to immigrant workers through Yiddish and Russian language publications. He also frequented the Yiddish radical library, which had been established by the Jewish anarchist group Arbeiter Fraind. Radowitzky became fluent in the Spanish language through conversations with his flatmates and acquaintances, and by reading Argentine newspapers.

=== Assassination of Falcón ===
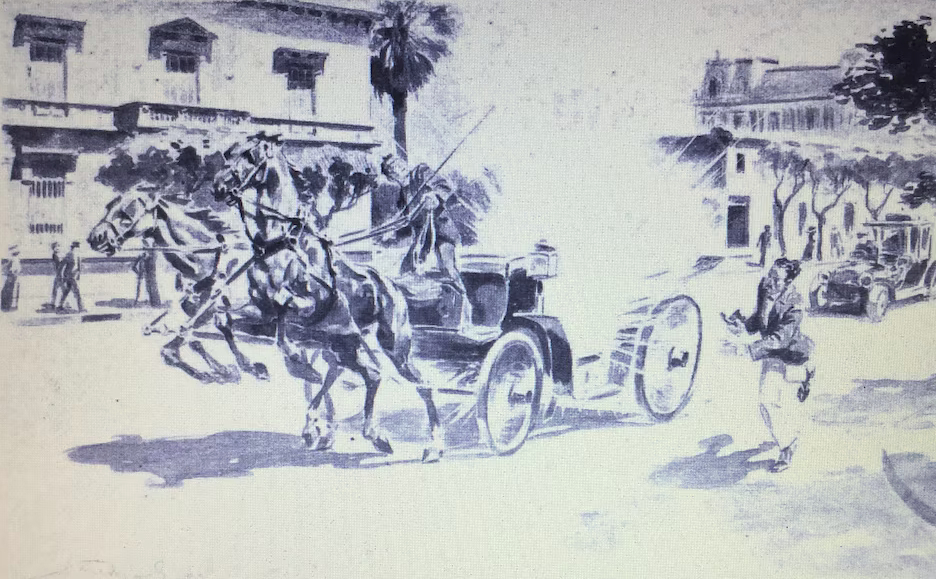
Illustration of Radowitzky's assassination of Ramón Lorenzo Falcón

During the Red Week of May 1909, police chief Ramón Lorenzo Falcón ordered an attack against participants in an International Workers' Day demonstration. Radowitzky was among the survivors of the attack and was described to have been clutching a scarf stained with blood. Following the attack, the demonstration escalated into a general strike. Strikers demanded Falcón's resignation, but he refused and received the support of the government. The strike ended without his resignation. Up until that day, Radowitzky had been opposed to the anarchist use of violence and propaganda of the deed. But, seeking revenge for the massacre, Radowitzky began plotting to assassinate Falcón. On 14 November 1909, Radowitzky learned of Falcón's whereabouts from a local newspaper. While Falcón was making his way back from a funeral, Radowitzky waited for him on Avenida Callao. He had prepared for any outcome, having armed himself with his Mauser pistol and dozens of bullets. He also brought along an accomplice, who stood watch on the corner of Avenida Callao and Avenida Quintana. The identity of the accomplice remains unknown, as Radowitzky covered for them by claiming sole responsibility for the attack.

As Falcón's barouche made its way from Quintana and headed south down Callao, Radowitzky ran up to the car and threw a bomb inside, blowing up the carriage and killing Falcón and his secretary. He then made his escape down Avenida Alvear, chased by police officers Benigno Guzmán and Enrique Muller. He struggled to put distance between him and his pursuers, eventually attempting to escape through a construction site. He stopped for a moment to draw his revolver and then began running again, but as he ran, he was shot in the right side of his chest and collapsed.

=== Arrest and trial ===
As he lay on the ground, in pain and exhausted, the police caught up to him and pulled him up by his hair; he cried out "long live anarchism", immediately identifying himself as a foreign anarchist. As he was being arrested, he told the police that he did not care what they did to him, declaring that he had plenty more bombs for the police. Radowitzky was then taken to the 15th police precinct, where he was narrowly saved from a summary execution by the assistant superintendent, who ordered that he be transferred to the Hospital Fernández and that his bullet wound be treated. After his wound was bandaged, he was returned to the 15th precinct, put in solitary confinement and interrogated. He told the police that he was from the Russian Empire and that he was 18 years old, but nothing more.

Throughout the investigation and his subsequent trial, Radowitzky refused to answer any questions about his identity. Instead, he openly bragged about his assassination of Falcón, taking full responsibility for it and outraging the prosecution. The public prosecutor, Manuel Beltrán, called Radowitzky a "helot" from the Ukrainian steppe. The prosecutor believed Radowitzky to be a born criminal due to the shape of his skull. Beltrán also claimed that Radowitzky's Jewish background made him a target of antisemitism, pushing him towards radical political views and ultimately forcing him to emigrate. The prosecutor called for the death penalty, but as Radowitzky was 18 years old, he was legally considered a minor and thus could not be executed.

The case for execution rested on determining his age, so the prosecution brought in physicians who estimated him to be 22 years old. However, his cousin Moises brought his birth certificate, which proved his status as a minor. The Argentine satirical magazine Caras y Caretas remarked that Radowitzky kept getting younger throughout the trial. Due to his young age, the judges opted to sentence him to indefinite imprisonment. They additionally stipulated that he be placed in solitary confinement and his rations restricted for three weeks each year coinciding with the anniversary of the assassination. Radowitzky spent the next 21 years of his life in prison.

=== Imprisonment ===
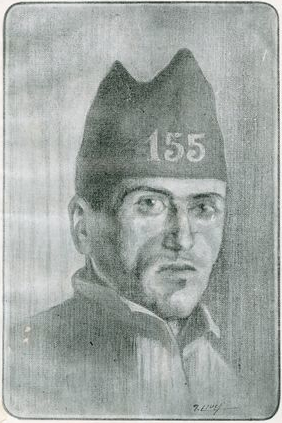
Illustration of Radowitzky, "prisoner 155"

During his time in the National Penitentiary, Radowitzky gained the sympathy of both inmates and guards. When Radowitzky requested a drier cell, the governor offered him one that was being replastered on the condition that he finish the job. Radowitzky refused, as the bricklayers' union was on strike. He also wrote a letter to the prison's director requesting he be transferred to a different prison where he could work. On 11 January 1911, anarchists Francisco Solano Regis and Salvador Planas Virella escaped from the National Penitentiary through a tunnel. Radowitzky had been in the prison's printing shop at the time of the breakout, so was not able to join the escape. Embarrassed by the breakout and worried by Radowitzky's popularity in the prison, prison authorities blamed him for the escape. Later that year, they transferred him to Ushuaia, in the far south of the country. He arrived on 14 March and was designated convict 155. There, he was placed in the Ushuaia penitentiary, a maximum-security prison designed to hold convicted felons and repeat offenders. He spent 19 years of his life imprisoned there.

Every November, per his court order, he was put in solitary confinement and given only bread and water. Whenever he requested reading material, the prison guards brought him only the Bible. In Buenos Aires, the Argentine anarchist movement began agitating for Radowitzky's release, pressuring Hipólito Yrigoyen's newly-elected liberal government for clemency. In 1916, Emilio López Arango published a condemnation of the government's treatment of Radowitzky, declaring "pages of history are written in blood." In May 1918, La Protesta published a pamphlet that paid tribute to Radowitzky and fiercely criticised the prison authorities for his mistreatment. The paper accused the prison's deputy governor, Gregorio Palacios, of torturing Radowitzky and named three guards that it alleged had sexually assaulted him. Public pressure forced Yrigoyen's government to launch an inquiry, which resulted in the three officers being suspended for "poor conduct".

=== Escape and recapture ===
As publicity about Radowitzky's imprisonment grew, some anarchists in the capital began plotting to break Radowitzky out of prison. They selected Miguel Arcángel Roscigna and Apolinario Barrera to carry out the operation; Barrera had previously been arrested in 1913 for publishing an article supporting Radowitzky. The two went to the southern Chilean city of Punta Arenas, where they linked up with members of the Federation of Chilean Workers (Spanish: Federacion de Obreros de Chile; FOCH). They hired a small cutter crewed by Croatian sailors and sailed to Ushuaia, where they arrived on 3 November 1918. Roscigna got a job as a prison guard at the penitentiary, where he prepared Radowitzky's escape. By this time, Radowitzky had been assigned to carry out penal labour as a mechanic. On the morning of 7 November, after he had started his work the prison's workshop, Roscigna supplied him with a prison guard's uniform. He quickly changed into the disguise and, at 07:00, he walked out of the prison without any of the guards recognising him.

When Radowitzky approached the cutter, Barrera initially thought he was a prison guard and drew his revolver on him, but they soon clarified each other's identities and boarded the ship. As Radowitzky was taken down the Beagle Channel, his accomplices giving him a change of clothes and two months' supplies. The plan was to leave him in a small settlement until search operations had stopped, then pick him up, but Radowitzky rejected the plan and convinced them to take him all the way to Punta Arenas. As no inmates had reported Radowitzky's escape, it took until 09:22 for a guard to discover that he had disappeared. Authorities immediately dispatched a steamboat to give chase, but the cutter managed to escape down the Ballenero Channel. News of Radowitzky's escape aroused excitement in Buenos Aires, with immediate public speculation over whether Radowitzky would be able get out of Patagonia in his condition.

After three or four days of sailing, they reached the Strait of Magellan, where they were intercepted by the Chilean Navy. Radowitzky dove into the ocean, swam 200 metres to the shore and hid. While his accomplices were detained for questioning, Radowitzky lay flat on the ground until the patrol boats left. Exhausted and freezing, he spent 7 hours walking towards Puntas Arenas. He was arrested only 12 kilometers outside the city and taken to a warship for transfer back to Ushuaia. On the night of 30 November, he arrived back at the penitentiary, where he was greeted with shouts of "Long live Simón!" by the other inmates. For the next two years, the guards held Radowitzky in solitary confinement in an underground cell and restricted his rations. Isolated and abused, Radowitzky fell so sick that he assumed he would die. In response to his ailing condition, a letter-writing campaign was initiated to demand his release. His parents, residing in Wisconsin, were among those who wrote in with their pleas. He was finally released from solitary on 7 January 1921. In total, Radowitzky spent 10 years of his imprisonment in solitary confinement.

=== Campaign for clemency ===
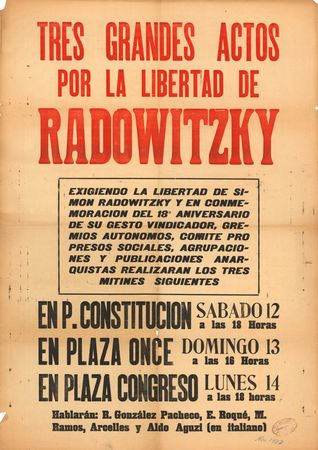
Poster advertising three political demonstrations in Buenos Aires, calling for Radowitzky's release

Back with the general prison population, Radowitzky became a confidant for many other prisoners, who met him in the workshop and told him about their problems. According to historian Ryan Edwards, Radowitzky's desire to help his fellow inmates distinguished him from the other political prisoners of Ushuaia, who distanced themselves from the criminal prisoners. He soon became a de facto representative for his fellow inmates, reporting their grievances to the governor or other state authorities and organising hunger strikes and sitdown strikes when their demands were refused. He also provided his fellow inmates with medicine and clothing. On one occasion, Radowitzky complained that his mate gourd had been confiscated during a search of his cell. He took any punishments doled out to the organised prisoners, which gained him respect among them. He also smuggled letters out of prison, supporting a campaign by the anarchist-aligned Argentine Regional Workers' Federation (FORA) for an eight-hour day. Meanwhile, in Buenos Aires, the Spanish anarchist Andrés Vázquez Paredes carried out a series of bombings to demand Radowitzky's release. In 1925, the newspaper La Razón set up an interview with Radowitzky. The interviewer reported that Radowitzky's cell was exceptionally clean and that he was talkative but expressed himself in simple language, often using slang or repeating himself. During the interview, Radowitzky expressed discomfort with his high status within the Argentine anarchist movement, insisting he had killed Falcón for ideological reasons and not for personal gain.

Over the years, Radowitzky continued to gain public support in Buenos Aires, with petitions and demonstrations regularly calling for his release. The campaign to free Radowitzky soon became the main priority of the Argentine anarchist movement and led to a resurgence in the activities of the FORA. The anarchist and working-class press emphasised Radowitzky's commitment to anarchism while neglecting to mention his Jewish identity. Roscigna began to discourage anarchists from carrying out "expropriations", worrying that violent incidents would discredit the campaign for Radowitzky's release. Public support for Radowitzky contributed to the Argentine government's decision not to pursue the extradition of the Spanish expropriator group Los Errantes. When the liberal Yrigoyen was re-elected in 1928, trade unions pressured him to pardon Radowitzky, and public debate about his continued imprisonment swept the press. Writer Ramón Doll defended Radowitzky's assassination of Falcón as a "social crime", symptomatic of class conflict, and declared it insignificant compared to the abuses perpetrated by the Argentine state. Doll called for the president to grant Radowitzky the right to apply for conditional release. On 27 March 1928, during a strike calling for Radowitzky's release, a bomb exploded under a passenger train, injuring a guard, and another on the underground railway was neutralised. On 20 May 1929, the FORA staged a 24-hour strike calling for Radowitzky's release.

In January 1930, Radowitzky was brought to the palace of the mayor of Ushuaia, where he met a journalist from the newspaper Crítica. The journalist greeted him on behalf of Apolinario Barrera, who was now the newspaper's manager. Radowitzky then opened up to the journalist, telling him that he was still anemic from a 20-day hunger strike the previous month. The strike had been in protest of superintendent Juan José Sanpedro, who had tortured a prisoner, and successfully secured Sanpedro's dismissal. Radowitzky brought up the 1 May 1909 massacre, and reaffirmed that he still wanted justice for the workers who were killed that day. He pleaded for sympathetic workers in Buenos Aires "not to sacrifice themselves" on his account, and asked them to concentrate on helping imprisoned workers other than him. He recounted that he had recently received 500 pesos, which he used to pay for medical treatment for sick inmates, and that the prison library was poorly stocked. When the interview was published in Buenos Aires, public opinion was solidified in favor of a pardon for Radowitzky. Anarchist organizations tracked down Radowitzky's parents, who personally appealed to the president for his release.

The Radical Civic Union (UCR) pressed for the president to pardon Radowitzky shortly before the 1930 Argentine legislative election, as they believed it would guarantee the working-class vote for their party. But the president was concerned about how the police and armed forces would react, so he opted not to pardon Radowitzky. Much of the working class voted for the Independent Socialist Party instead of the UCR. President Yrigoyen began to reconsider pardoning Radowitzky, despite the UCR warning him of unrest among the armed forces over the issue. On Palm Sunday of 13 April 1930, the FORA organized a large demonstration at a cinema on Avenida Boedo, where they called for Radowitzky's release in the seasonal spirit of forgiveness. On Holy Monday the following day, Yrigoyen issued a decree pardoning 110 prisoners, including Radowitzky. The news elicited elation from the Argentine anarchist movement, and newspapers announcing the pardon sold out. Preempting any reaction from the army, Yrigoyen's decree included a condition that Radowitzky be expelled from Argentina, which drew heavy criticism from La Prensa. The move was seen as unconstitutional, as the Argentine National Congress had abolished penal expulsion in 1921.

=== Deportation to Uruguay ===
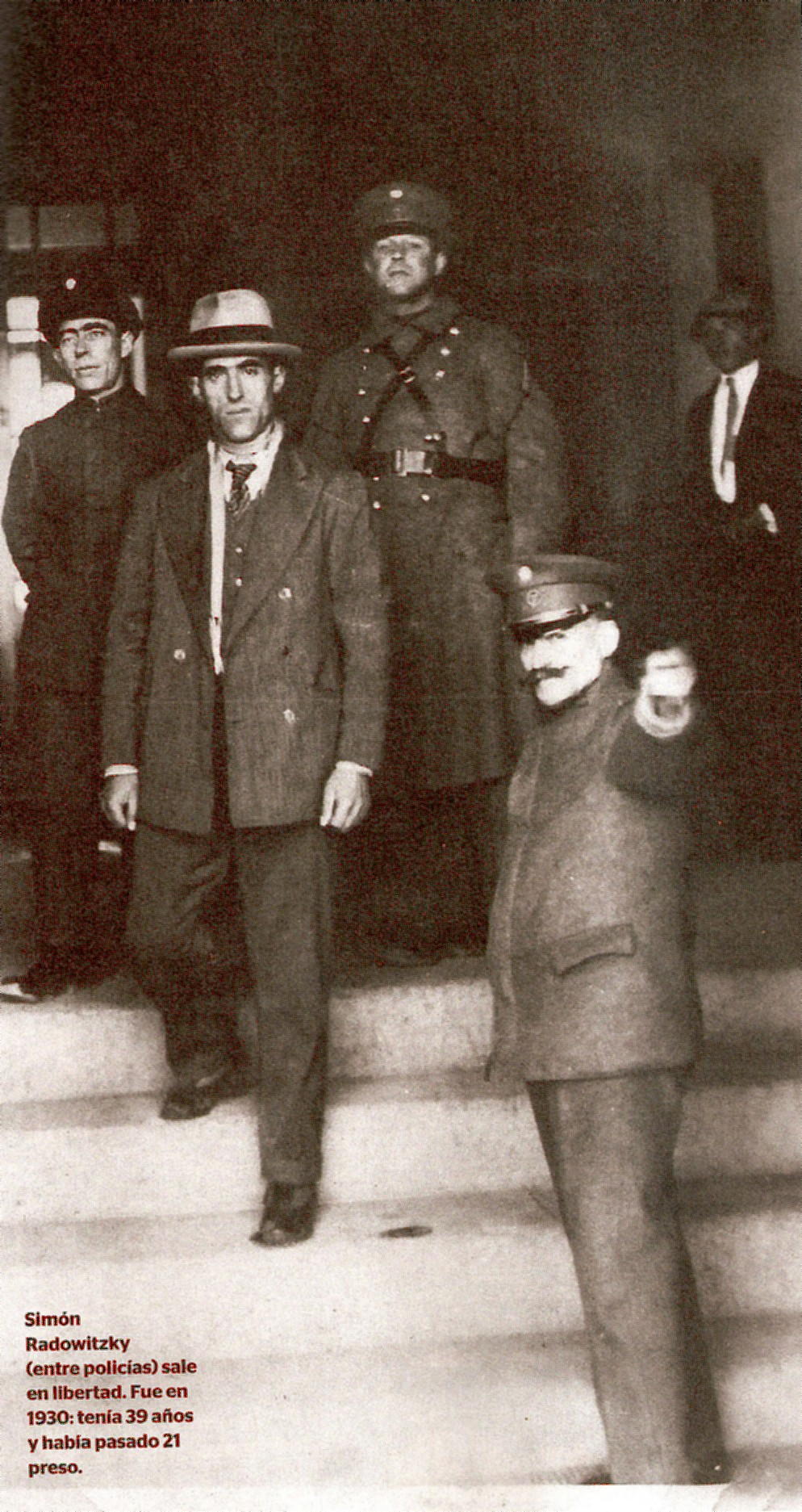
Radowitzky leaving prison in May 1930

On 14 May 1930, Radowitzky was finally released from prison. A photograph of him wearing a pinstriped suit, exiting the prison, began circulating throughout Buenos Aires. Radowitzky played a game of football in this suit shortly after his release. He was soon informed that he would not be permitted to return to Buenos Aires, and that he was instead to be taken to Montevideo, the capital of Uruguay. Without papers, which the Buenos Aires police had refused to give him, Radowitzky was obliged to accept deportation. At 23:30, Radowitzky boarded the steamboat bound for Montevideo, escorted by three Argentines. As the steamboat captain insisted that Radowitzky pay a fare for the journey, he paid for a third-class ticket with his last remittance from the anarchists of Buenos Aires. He then sent on a telegram to anarchists in Montevideo indicating when he would arrive. Radowitzky's impending arrival in Uruguay divided public opinion there. The right-wing press complained that the Argentines were sending them an "undesirable" and pressured President Juan Campisteguy to refuse Radowitzky entry. But Article 79 of the 1918 Uruguayan constitution guaranteed the right of asylum, which Campisteguy granted to Radowitzky.

When Radowitzky arrived in Montevideo, he was greeted by a crowd of 100 anarchists, including some from Buenos Aires. The border guards permitted every passenger except Radowitzky - who had no identity papers - to disembark. Anarchists immediately set off to negotiate with the government, and less than two hours later, immigration director Juan Rolando gave him permission to enter the country. As he disembarked, he greeted the gathered anarchists with a shout of "Long live anarchism!" When he stepped ashore, immigration officials quickly gave him a medical examination and found that his left lung was infected. After answering journalists' questions and clearing up some disinformation that he was planning to return to Ukraine, he set off in a taxi to his new home on Calle Justicia. When asked about his release by journalists, he proclaimed that his pardon had been secured by the working class and that Yrigoyen had only acceded to their demands.

His new life in the busy centre of Montevideo initially left Radowitzky anxious and exhausted, but he slowly adapted to it. He found work as a mechanic, although he had to avoid exerting himself due to his lung infection. His health deteriorated in the country's subtropical climate, eventually forcing him to stop working. At his friends' urging, he took trips to Brazil for rest and recuperation, although police suspected him of carrying messages for the two countries' anarchist movements. Following the 1930 Argentine coup d'état, Radowitzky began aiding anarchists who had been deported from Argentina under the dictatorship of José Félix Uriburu. Argentine poet Leopoldo Lugones, a supporter of the dictatorship, cited the strike actions undertaken previously in support of Radowitzky as a motive for the deportation of foreign anarchists. Radowitzky managed to secure asylum in Uruguay for many Italian and Russian deportees, saving them from being taken to Fascist Italy or the Soviet Union. In March 1931, Radowitzky was accused of helping several Argentine anarchists escape from prison, but was able to provide an alibi for what he was doing during the breakout.

=== Imprisonment in Uruguay ===
In 1933, Uruguayan president Gabriel Terra consolidated power and established a dictatorship. On 7 December 1934, police put Radowitzky under house arrest. Under a new deportation law passed by the dictatorship, Radowitzky was ordered to leave the county. His friends informed the socialist lawyer Emilio Frugoni, who advised Radowitzky not to leave, as it would set a precedent for political deportations. When the police found out about this, they arrested Radowitzky and other left-wing leaders and detained them on the Isla de Flores. Frugoni protested and demanded he be allowed to see Radowitzky, but he was only able to secure his client with a bed for his ad hoc cell.

Over the subsequent months, many of the prisoners were released, except for Radowitzky and four other people. During his imprisonment, Radowitzky learned that his father had died in October 1935. Anarchists and other left-wing anarchists in Argentina and Uruguay began campaigning for his release. He also received support from the Communist Party of Uruguay, although he rejected their support in protest against their attacks against other anarchists. After 15 months of sustained appeals by Frugoni, on 21 March 1936, Radowitzky was released. Back in Montevideo, police attempted to put him back under house arrest, but as he no longer had a home, they transferred him back to prison. Three months later, on 25 June 1936, a judge ruled that Radowitzky was "not an undesirable", that police had harassed him without evidence and that his conduct since arriving in Uruguay had been lawful. On 1 July, Radowitzky was once again released from prison, for the final time in his life.

=== Spanish Civil War ===
The Spanish Civil War broke out in July 1936. The stories Radowitzky heard of anarchism in Spain reminded him of the actions of the Russian nihilist movement; he cited the assassination of Alexander II of Russia as a justification for the use of violence as a means to achieve social change. He made plans to go to Spain in August, writing that his anarchist idealism had driven him to "love life and Struggle". He remained in Montevideo into September, waiting impatiently for Diego Abad de Santillán to organise his journey to Spain. In the meantime, he began organising shipments of winter clothes to Spain and wrote to his comrades in Argentina to send wool to the country. As he continued waiting to go to Spain, he received discouraging news about the state of the Republican war effort but remained optimistic about the capacity of the Spanish working class to win the war.

Front lines of the Spanish Civil War, at the time of the battle of Teruel in late 1937

After months of waiting, Radowitzky finally departed for Spain, arriving in Barcelona in early 1937. He was initially appointed as a liaison officer, but quickly grew anxious to join his comrades at the front. Throughout the war, he became increasingly ideologically disillusioned, especially after the dissolution of the confederal militias and the political repression of the anarchists during the May Days. He described this as the "moral defeat" of the Spanish Republic. During this time, he wrote several letters to the Argentine anarcha-feminist Salvadora Medina Onrubia.

Later that year, he joined the 28th Division of the Spanish Republican Army led by Gregorio Jover and went to fight on the Aragon front. He fought in the Battle of Teruel (which he later called the "Spanish Stalingrad") and was nearly killed in the fighting. Despite the Republican defeat in the battle, he remained optimistic that "as long as there is a man standing in loyal Spain, they will not pass". He believed that they should continue fighting to the last man to defend Spain's freedom from Italian fascism and Nazism.

After ten months on the front lines, due to his health problems, Radowitzky was forcibly transferred to the rearguard. There, he worked for the propaganda section of the National Confederation of Labour (CNT). During the Nationalists' Catalonia Offensive, he organised the preservation of the CNT archives and their transportation to the International Institute of Social History in Amsterdam.

=== Later life ===
By the time the Nationalists won the war in early 1939, Radowitzky and his small group of South American anarchists fled across the Pyrenees into France. He was initially interned in a French concentration camp in Saint-Cyprien, but he managed to escape and crossed through France to Belgium. Unlike his fellow volunteers from South America, he was not able to return to Argentina or Uruguay. Radowitzky was thus forced to accept his own statelessness and began referring to himself as a "wandering Jew". He was critical of the idea of a homeland for the Jewish people, while also complaining of Jewish anti-fascists who had erased their own Jewish identity. In exile, Radowitzky lost his faith in the prospects of revolution but remained committed to his anarchist beliefs.

Radowitzky, using a fake Cuban passport, impersonated a Cuban citizen, traveling to Mexico in May 1939. There, he was able to secure asylum. By February 1941, he had been naturalized as a Mexican citizen. He changed his name to Raúl Gómez Saavedra, and the Uruguayan poet Ángel Falco secured him with a job at the local consulate. He found lodgings in a boarding house in Mexico City. Radowitzky reported that, despite his pride in his new Mexican nationality, he continued to feel a nostalgic connection to Argentina. He particularly missed drinking mate with Salvadora Medina.

Radowitzky hoped to visit his mother in the United States, but he was unable to cross the Mexico–United States border, as he was denied an entry visa due to his anarchist affiliation. He spent the last 16 years of his life in Mexico, continuing to work and remaining active in the anarchist movement. He died from a heart attack on either 29 February or 4 March 1956.

== Legacy ==
The Argentine anarchist movement venerates Radowitzky as a hero, and he inspired a tradition of direct action against the state by individualist anarchists. His biographers, Diego Abad de Santillán and Osvaldo Bayer, respectively described him as "the avenger and martyr" and an "expropriating anarchist". In contrast, the Argentine police continue to vilify him for his assassination of Falcón. Radowitzky had a cameo appearance in Bruce Chatwin's 1977 book In Patagonia.

In the wake of the 2008 financial crisis, the Argentine anarchist movement once again took up Radowitzky's legacy, invoking his name while organising workers and occupying factories. In 2010, Radowitzky's life was the subject of a full-length biography by Alejandro Marti. The 2010 Argentine television series Lo que el tiempo nos dejó included an episode about Radowitzky's assassination of Falcón. In 2013, his life was covered in the documentary Simón, el hijo del pueblo. In the 2015 historical novel, La más agraciada, Alicia Dujovne Ortiz portrayed Radowitzky's relationship with Medina as romantic, although in reality it was strictly platonic. That same year, Agustín Comotto published a graphic novel about Radowitzky's life, 155 Simón Radowitzky.

== Bibliography ==
- Abidor, Mitchell (2015). "Coda: Simon Radowitzky". Death to Bourgeois Society: The Propagandists of the Deed. PM Press. pp. 105–115. ISBN 978-1-62963-112-7.
- Abidor, Mitchell (2018). "155 Simon Radowitzky". Anarchist Studies. 25 (2): 124–125. ISSN 0967-3393.
- Baer, James A. (2015). Anarchist Immigrants in Spain and Argentina. University of Illinois Press. ISBN 978-0-252-09697-6.
- Bayer, Osvaldo (2012) [1991]. Simon Radowitzky and the People's Justice. Berkeley, California: Elephant Editions. OCLC 1194606388.
- Bayer, Osvaldo (2015) [1975]. The Anarchist Expropriators: Buenaventura Durruti and Argentina's Working-Class Robin Hoods. Oakland, California: AK Press. ISBN 978-1-84935-223-9. OCLC 908088288.
- Catoggio, Maria Soledad (2013). "The Consecration of Political Suffering: Martyrs, Heroes and Victims in Argentine Political Culture". Journal of Latin American Studies. 45 (4): 695–719. doi:10.1017/S0022216X13001144. hdl:11336/1054.
- Colombo, Eduardo (1971). "Anarchism in Argentina and Uruguay". In Apter, D.E.; Joll, J. (eds.). Anarchism Today. Studies in Comparative Politics. London: Palgrave Macmillan. pp. 181–211. doi:10.1007/978-1-349-01074-5_10. ISBN 978-1-349-01074-5.
- C̦orlu, Aksel Bora (2011). The disreputable phoenix: A transnational history of propaganda by the deed (PDF) (PhD). State University of New York.
- Craib, Raymond (2023). "Lxs anarquistas". Latin American Research Review. 58 (3): 717–729. doi:10.1017/lar.2023.27.
- Edwards, Ryan (2014). "From the Depths of Patagonia: The Ushuaia Penal Colony and the Nature of "The End of the World."". Hispanic American Historical Review. 94 (2): 271–302. doi:10.1215/00182168-2641262.
- Edwards, Ryan C. (2018). "Post-Colonial Latin America, since 1800". In Anderson, Clare (ed.). A Global History of Convicts and Penal Colonies. Bloomsbury Academic. pp. 245–270. doi:10.5040/9781350000704.ch-009. ISBN 9781350000704.
- Edwards, Ryan C. (2022). "The Martyr in Argentine Siberia". A Carceral Ecology: Ushuaia and the History of Landscape and Punishment in Argentina. University of California Press. pp. 85–104. doi:10.2307/j.ctv2j6xffk.9.
- Jensen, Richard Bach (2013). "The First Global Wave of Terrorism and International Counter-Terrorism, 1905–1914". In Hanhimäki, Jussi M.; Blumenau, Bernhard (eds.). An International History of Terrorism. Routledge. pp. 16–33. ISBN 978-0-203-09346-7.
- Jensen, Richard Bach (2015). "Anarchist Terrorism and Global Diasporas, 1878–1914". Terrorism and Political Violence. 27 (3): 441–453. doi:10.1080/09546553.2015.1032032.
- Mattox, Henry E. (2004). Chronology of world terrorism, 1901-2001. McFarland. ISBN 0-7864-1992-X.
- Moya, Jose C. (2004). "The Positive Side of Stereotypes: Jewish Anarchists in Early-Twentieth-Century Buenos Aires". Jewish History. 18 (1): 19–48. doi:10.1023/B:JEHI.0000005735.80946.27. JSTOR 20100922.
- Nouwen, Mollie Lewis (2013). "From Colony to City: Jewish Immigrants 1889-1930". Oy, My Buenos Aires: Jewish Immigrants and the Creation of Argentine National Identity. UNM Press. pp. 25–51. ISBN 9780826353511.
- O'Neill Cuesta, Fernando (2020). Direct Action in Montevideo: Uruguayan Anarchism, 1927–1937. AK Press. ISBN 9781849353199.
- Paz, Abel (2006) [1996]. Durruti in the Spanish Revolution. Translated by Morse, Chuck. Edinburgh: AK Press. ISBN 1-904859-50-X. LCCN 2006920974. OCLC 482919277.
- Raboy, Mark (2022). Looking for Alicia: The Unfinished Life of an Argentinian Rebel. Oxford University Press. ISBN 9780190058104.
- Rein, Raanan (2014). "A Trans-National Struggle with National and Ethnic Goals: Jewish-Argentines and Solidarity with the Republicans during the Spanish Civil War". Journal of Iberian and Latin American Research. 20 (2): 171–182. doi:10.1080/13260219.2014.939124.
- Roldán Cañizares, Enrique; Rosso, Matías (2020). "Ascension and decline of positivism in Argentina". GLOSSAE. European Journal of Legal History (17): 469–485. ISSN 2255-2707.
- Senkman, Leonardo (2022). "Simón Radowitzky: Revolution, Exile, and a Wandering Jew Imaginary". In Gabbay, Cynthia (ed.). Jewish Imaginaries of the Spanish Civil War: In Search of Poetic Justice. Bloomsbury Academic. pp. 56–75. ISBN 978-1-5013-7942-0.
- Simon, S. Fanny (1946). "Anarchism and Anarcho-Syndicalism in South America". The Hispanic American Historical Review. 26 (1). Duke University Press: 38–59. doi:10.2307/2507692. ISSN 1527-1900. JSTOR 2507692.
- Trigona, Marie (1 May 2009). "May Day Massacre – 100 years ago: Simón Radowitzky, Anarchist and Legend". NACLA Report on the Americas. ISSN 1071-4839.
- Varela, Mirta (2015). "Memory and childhood in the melodrama of the Malvinas War: The Children Who Write on the Sky". Critical Arts. 29 (5): 644–657. doi:10.1080/02560046.2015.1125095. hdl:11336/71005.
- Zimmermann, Eduardo (2023). "Racial Thinking and Ethnic Minorities in Latin America". In Collin, Peter; Casagrande, Agustín (eds.). Law and Diversity: European and Latin American Experiences from a Legal Historical Perspective (PDF). Vol. 1. Max Planck Institute for Legal History and Legal Theory. pp. 385–394. ISBN 978-3-944773-40-7.
