= Yaacov Oved =

Israeli historian (born 1929)

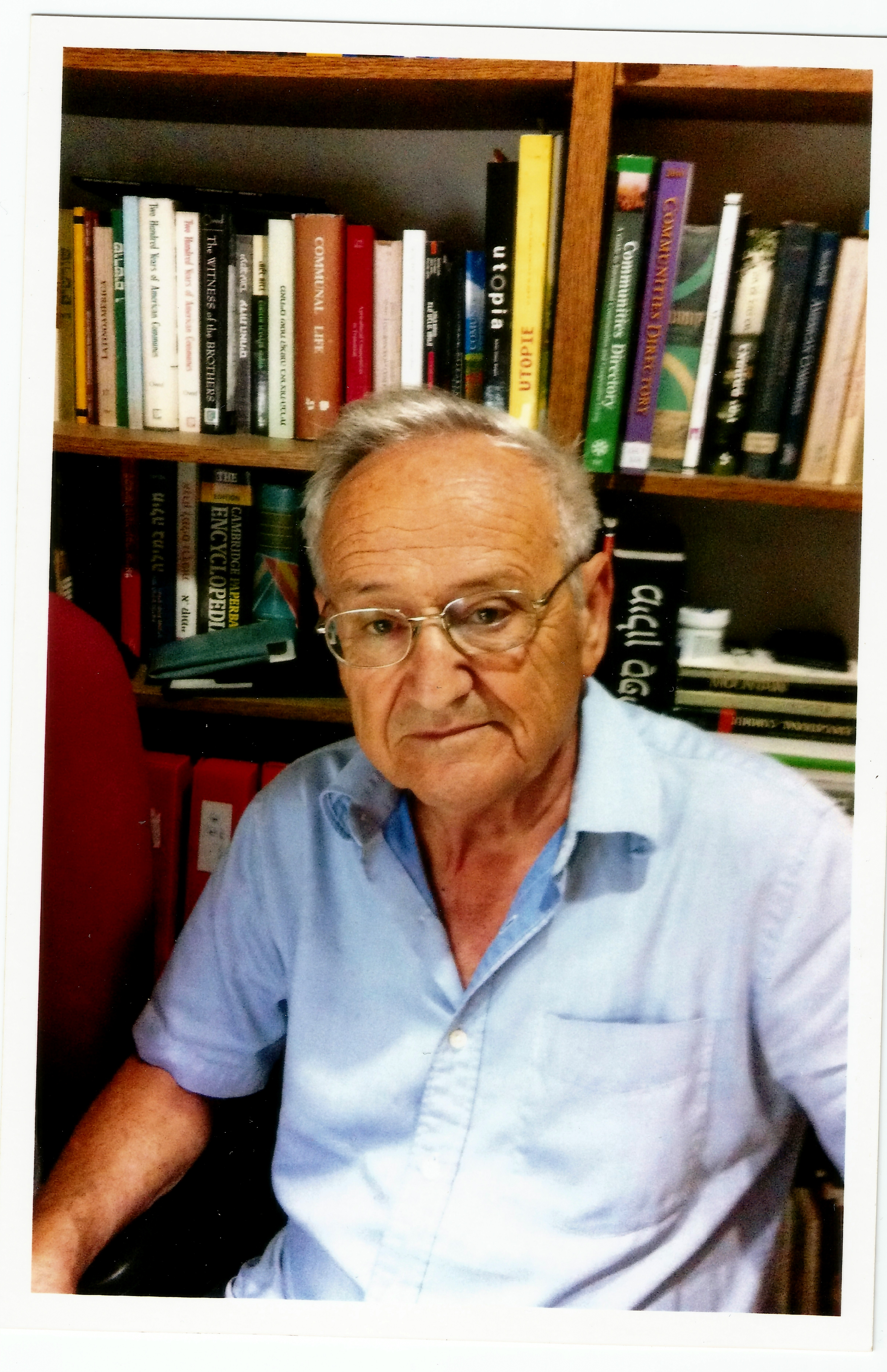
Yaacov Oved, 2014

Yaacov Oved (Hebrew: יעקב עובד; born 19 February 1929) is a historian and Professor Emeritus in the Department of History at Tel Aviv University, member of Kibbutz Palmachim, an Israeli socialist commune, research fellow at Yad Tabenkin: the institute of research and documentation of the kibbutz movement, researcher of the history of communes in the world and co- founder of the International Communal Studies Association.

== Biography ==
Yaacov Varsano-Oved was born on 19 February 1929 in Haskovo, Bulgaria. When he was eight years old, he immigrated to Palestine with his parents, Ovadia and Bella Varsano and brother Eliyahu. The family resided in Tel Aviv. Yaacov went to Echad Haam School and Gymnasia Herzliya High School and joined the Scouts youth movement. In 1946 he enlisted in the "Hagana" organization and was a member of the Palmach unit and was assigned by it to be a leader in the Scouts Movement in 1947. In 1949 he was part of a Palmach core-group that established Kibbutz Palmachim. In 1941-1954 he was sent by Hakibbutz Hameuchad to Argentina to work as educator emissary in the youth movement "Hanoar Hechalutz iBorochovy Hakibbutz Hameuchad". In 1951, he married Tehila Kiriaty and the couple made their home in Palmachim, where their son and three daughters were born and educated. In 1954-1959 he worked in agriculture on the kibbutz, and from 1959 to 1961 he studied in the two-year higher education course in the Hakibbutz Hameuchad Seminar at Efal. Later he began teaching at the high school in kibbutz Palmachim. In 1967 he set out on a brief mission to Argentina. On this occasion he changed his surname to the Hebrew name Oved.

In the 1950s he published several articles about Latin American affairs in Israeli journals. In 1958, in one of the articles about Cuba, he predicted that Fidel Castro would overthrow the dictatorship of Batista and start a Socialist revolution. In 1960 he joined the Israel-Cuba Friendship League and in 1964 was part of the League's delegation to Cuba. In the course of his visit he witnessed several facets of the regime that he did not regard favorably, and after the visit he left the League.

In 1959-1961 he studied in the Higher Education Course of social sciences run by Hakibbutz Hameuchad in Efal. Later he became a teacher at the Kibbutz Palmachim High School. In 1969 he started to study at the Departments of History and Philosophy at Tel Aviv University and graduated with "Summa cum Laude". In 1971, he started his PhD at Oxford University. His dissertation was on Anarchism and the Workers’ Movement in Argentina in the Early Twentieth Century. It was supervised by Professor Michael Confino of Tel Aviv University and Professor Ezequiel Gallo of the University of Buenos Aires.

After his thesis was approved in 1975 by the Senate of Tel Aviv University, Oved was appointed as a lecturer in the Tel Aviv University's Department of History. At the same time he joined Yad Tabenkin, the Institute for Study and Documentation of the Kibbutz Movement, as a teacher and research associate. It was in this institute that he began to study the history of communes around the world. In 1978, while on a research journey to investigate communes' archives in the United States, he participated in a conference of the American National Historic Communal Studies Association in Omaha Nebraska. In the meeting with the association's president, Donald E Pitzer, he raised the idea of holding an international conference of commune and kibbutz researchers in Israel. Yad Tabenkin undertook the initiative and in 1985, under its auspices, the first international conference of kibbutz and commune scholars took place. At the end of the conference, the International Communal Studies Association was founded. Prof. Oved elected to serve as its executive director, a position which he continued to fill until 2004. Since its founding, the association has held 11 tri-annual international conferences in different universities and commune venues around the world. During that period, Yaacov Oved served as the acting chairman of the association.

In 1994, Yaacov Oved was nominated full professor at Tel Aviv University, retiring in 1998. During the years that followed, he was dedicated to the Yad Tabenkin Communes Department. In this framework he cultivated relations with commune researchers from around the world. These relationships deepened the ties between the Kibbutz Movement and the world communes. Prof. Oved was devoted also to enlarging the Yad Tabenkin scientific library on communes, whose collection on communes and kibbutz publications has earned a high reputation among scholars of these fields.

== Scientific activities ==
Yaacov Oved's PhD thesis on anarchism in the Argentine labor movement in the early 20th century was published as a book in Spanish in 1978 by Siglo XXI Publishing and an extended second edition was printed in 2013 by Imago Mundi, Buenos Aires.

In 1986, Yaacov Oved published his comprehensive book Two Hundred Years of American Communes, and subsequently published additional books on contemporary communes. In addition to his books about communes, Prof. Oved has published books and articles about anarchism, utopian anarcho-communist philosophy and anarchistic communes in the Spanish Civil War.

In 2014, he published an article about independent kibbutz high education that reviews the history of the Efal high education courses in which Yaacov Oved was both a student and a teacher.

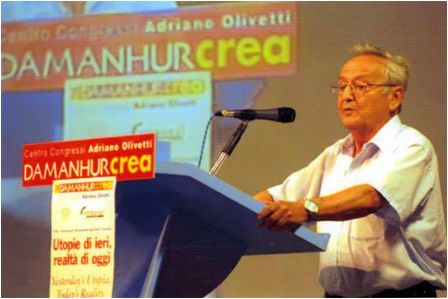
Yaacov Oved in an International Conference

== Research awards ==
The Communal Studies Association, USA, bestowed honorary awards on Prof. Yaacov Oved in the years 2000 and 2004 for his research and contribution to promoting international relations:

1. Distinguished Scholar Award, Communal Studies Association, USA, 2000
2. Donal Pitzer Distinguished Service Award, Communal Studies Association, USA, 2004
3. European Utopian Studies Society awarded Prof. Oved the "Founding Member Award" in 2009 for his contribution in founding the society.
4. The International Communal Studies Society awarded Prof. Oved the "Founding Member Award" in 2010 for his scientific lifetime achievement.

== Books ==
- Anarchism and the Workers Movement in Argentina (Spanish), Mexico City: Siglo Veintiuno, 1978
- El anarquismo y el movimientoobreroen Argentina Edicion Definitiva (Spanish), 2nd edition, Buenos Aires: Imago Mundi, 2013
- Two Hundred Years of American Communes, Tel Aviv, Hakibbutz Hameuchad and Yad Tabenkin, 1986
- Two Hundred Years of American Communes, New Brunswick, USA and Oxford, UK: Transaction Books Press, 1988
- Two Hundred Years of American Communes, 2nd edition, New Brunswick, USA: Transaction Books Paperback, 1993
- Distant Brothers: History of the Relations between the Bruderhof and the Kibbutz, Efal: Yad Tabenkin, 1993
- The Witness of the Brothers: History of the Bruderhof Communal Movement, 1920–1994, New Brunswick, USA: Transaction, 1996
- The Witness of the Brothers History of the Bruderhof Communal Movement, 1920–1994, 2nd edition, N.J. USA: Transaction paperback, 2012
- Communes and Intentional Communities in the Second Half of the Twentieth Century, Efal: Yad Tabenkin, 2009
- Comunas-Comunidadeas Colectivistasen el Mundo (Spanish), Buenos Aires: Acervo Cultural, 2012
- Globalization of Communes, 1950–2010, N.J. USA: Transaction Publishers, 2013
- Higher Education in the Kibbutz Movement: Efal Two-Year Course, Efal, Yad Tabenkin, 2014
- Select studies
- The"Justicialismo" Regime in Argentina ( Hebrew) Mibefnim volume 18 1955
- The Roots of the Cuban Revolution (Hebrew) Mibefnim vol. 25 1964
- "Anarchist Culture in Argentina at the Beginning of the 20th Century", Latino America: Anularlo/Estudios Latino Americanos, no. 17, UNAM, Mexico, 1985
- "The Future Society According to Kropotkin" (Hebrew), Shorashim 6, Tel Aviv: HaKibbutz Hameuchad Publishers and Yad Tabenkin, 1991
- "Influence of Spanish Anarchism on the Formation of Argentinian Anarchism" (Spanish), in: Estudios Interdisciplinarios de America Latina v el Caribe, Universidad de Tel-Aviv: Escuela de Historia Enero Junlo, 1991
- "The Future Society According to Kropotkin", Cahiers du Monde Russeet Sovietbue: Ecole des Hautes Etudes et Sciences Sociales, Paris, July 1992
- "Communismo Libertarlo and Communes in the Spanish Collectivization", in: Anarchism–Communitv and Utopia, Praha: Institute of Philosophy, Chechoslovakian Academy of Sciences, Filosoficky Gustav, AVCR, 1993
- "The Uniqueness of Anarchism in Argentina", Estudios Interdisciplinarios de America Latina, vol. 8/1, Enero/Junio, 1997
- "Introduction" to Peter Kropotkin, Fields Factories and Workshops, New Brunswick N.J.: Transaction Publishers, 1993
- "The Rise and Fall of Anarcho Communism in Argentina", in: Z. Medin & R. Rein (eds), Society and Identity in Argentina, (Hebrew), MifalimUniversitaim, 1997
- "Mouvements Commaunautaire au XX Siecle", in: Utopie La quete de la societeidealeen Occident (French), Bibliothèque nationale de France, 2000
- "Communal Movements in the Twentieth Century", in: Utopia, The Search of Ideal Society, Oxford UK: The New York Public Library, 2000
- “Anarcho-Communism and Collectivism”, in: Raanan Reich (ed.): Fascism will not Pass: the Spanish Civil War. Tel Aviv University: Zemanim, 2000(Hebrew)
- “Social Justice in Communes”, in Abraham Yasour, Yaacov Oved, Danny Rosolio and Menachem Rosner (eds.), Social Justice and Equality in aChanging World, BeneiBerak: HakibbutzHameuchad, 2003
- Communal Trends in the World Mifne (Hebrew) EfalYadTtabenkin September 2003
- "L'anarchismedans le movement des kibbutz", in: Juifset anarchists, Paris: Editions de l'éclat, 2008
- "Unainmigracion peculiar: La Sociedad de Hermanosen p-Paraguay", Buenos Aires: El Hilo Rojo – Ediciones Paidos, 2009
- “Kibbutzim and Communes: Comparative Aspects”, in Aviva Chalamish and Zvi Tzameret (eds.), The Kibbutz, First Hundred Years, Jerusalem: Yad Itzhak Ben Zvi, 2010
- "The International Association of Kibbutzim and Communes", in: M. Palgi & S. Reinarz (eds), One Hundred Years of Kibbutz Life, New Jersey: Transaction Publishers, 2011
- "Anarchist Utopians and the Kibbutz Movement", in: Artur Blaim and Ludmila Gruszewska (eds), Spectres of Utopia, Oxford: Spectres of Utopia Peter Lang, 2012
- "Communes and Communities: History and Perspective", in: Eliezer Ben Rafael, Yaacov Oved and Menachem Topel (eds), The Communal Idea in the 21st Century, Boston: Brill Leiden, 2013
