= Ramón Lorenzo Falcón =

Argentine politician and police officer (1855–1909)

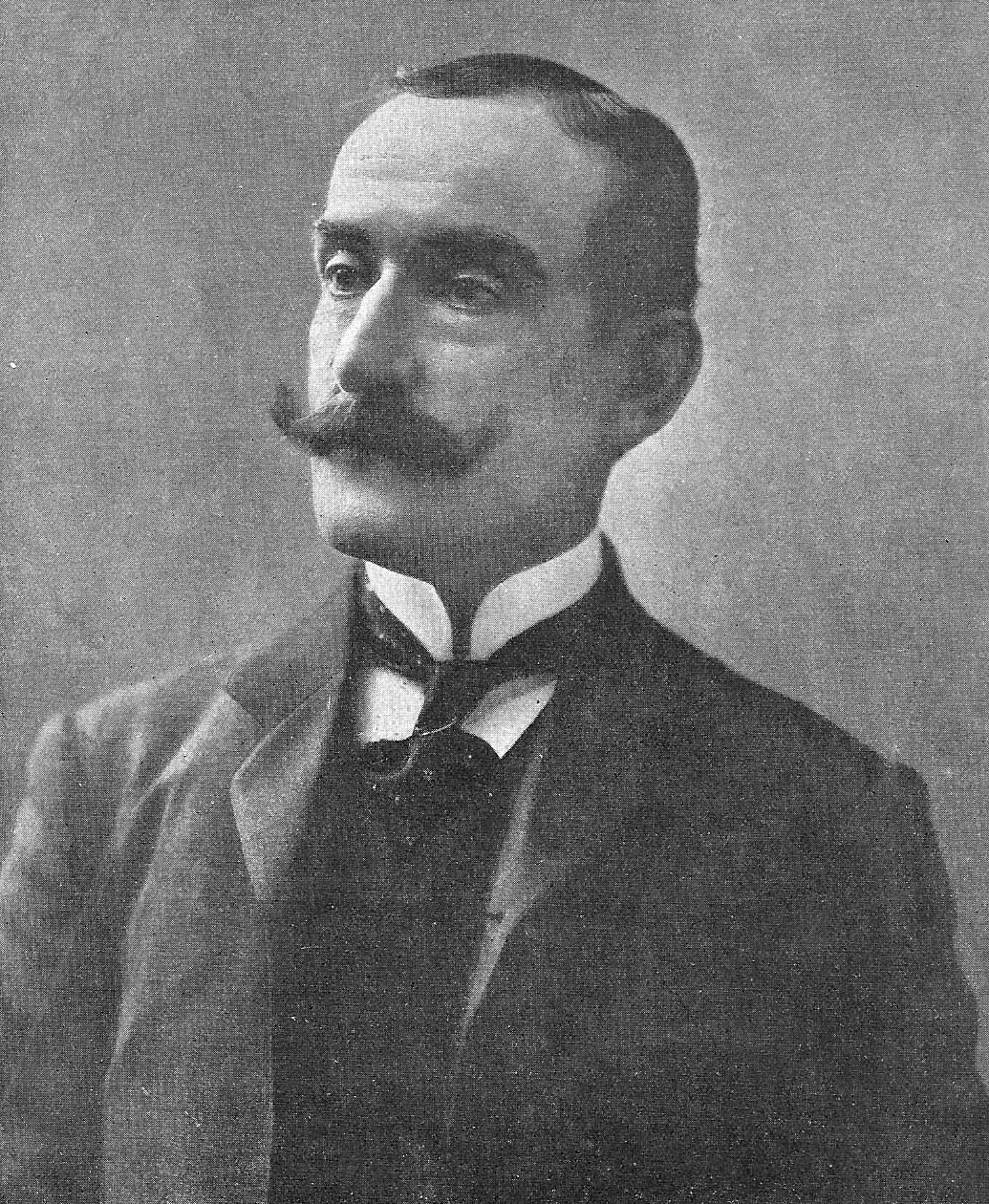
- Falcón on the cover of Caras y Caretas, 1909.
- Born: August 30, 1855; Buenos Aires, Argentina
- Died: November 14, 1909 (aged 54); Buenos Aires

Ramón Lorenzo Falcón (Spanish: [raˈmon loˈɾenso falˈkon]; August 30, 1855 – November 14, 1909) was an Argentine Army officer, politician, and Chief of the Argentine Federal Police.

== Life and times ==
=== Early life and career in Army ===
Falcón was born in Buenos Aires. He enrolled at the National Military College and graduated with honors in 1873. He served as aide de camp to President Domingo Sarmiento and was enlisted in the Conquest of the Desert campaign. He co-founded the Club de Gimnasia y Esgrima La Plata football club in 1887; CGE would become the oldest association football team in continuous existence in the Americas.

He retired from the Army in 1898 with the rank of Colonel, and was elected to the Argentine Chamber of Deputies for Buenos Aires on the ruling National Autonomist Party ticket. Amid growing civil unrest, President José Figueroa Alcorta appointed Falcón as Chief of the Argentine Federal Police upon taking office in 1906. Figueroa Alcorta believed that, led by a military officer, the Federal Police would be better able to react to and control protests. Accordingly, Falcón established the Cadets' Training Academy, streamlined the force's administration, and had new uniforms designed.

=== Chief of Police ===
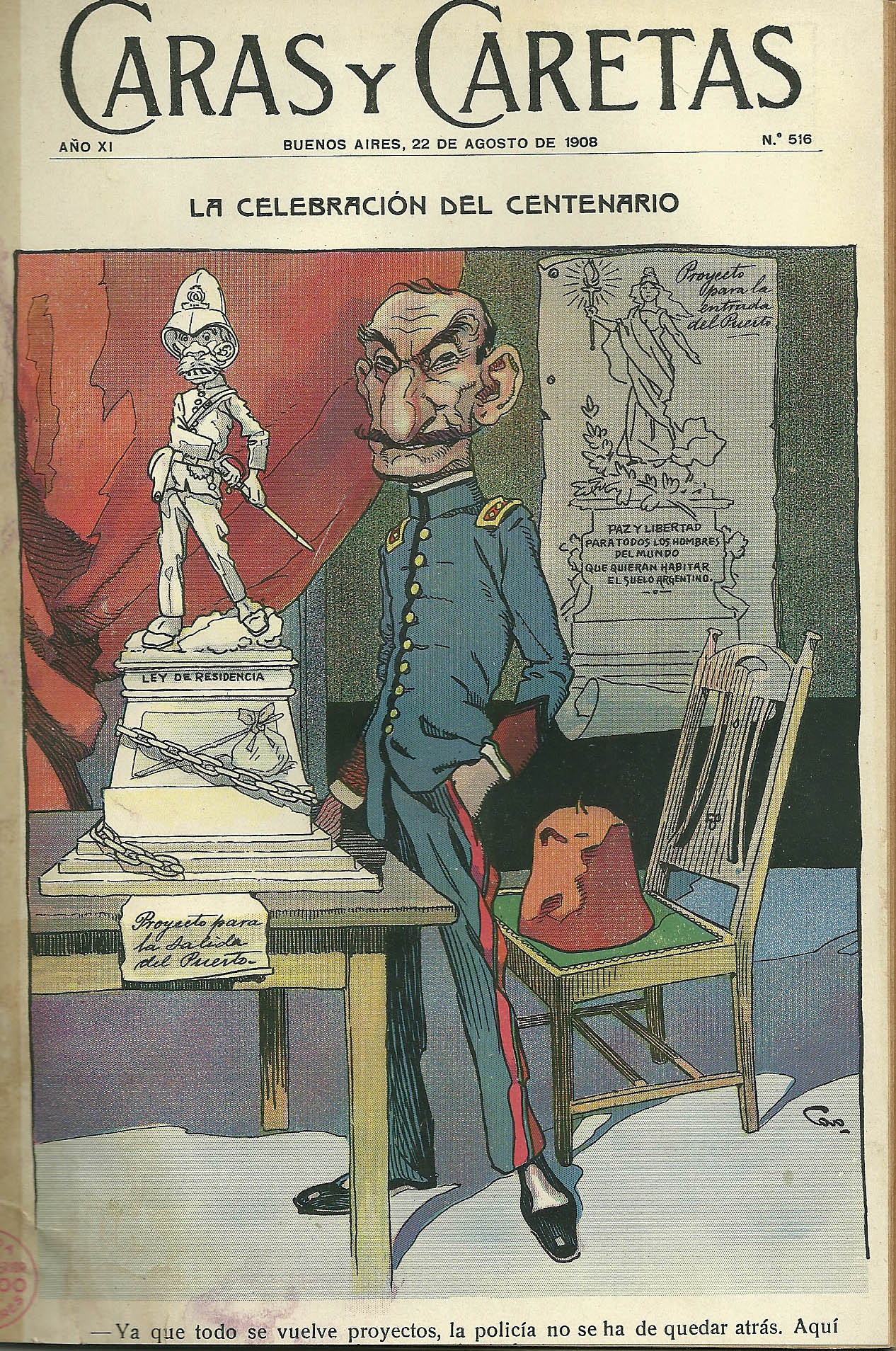
Caricature of Falcón on the cover of Caras y Caretas, 1909.

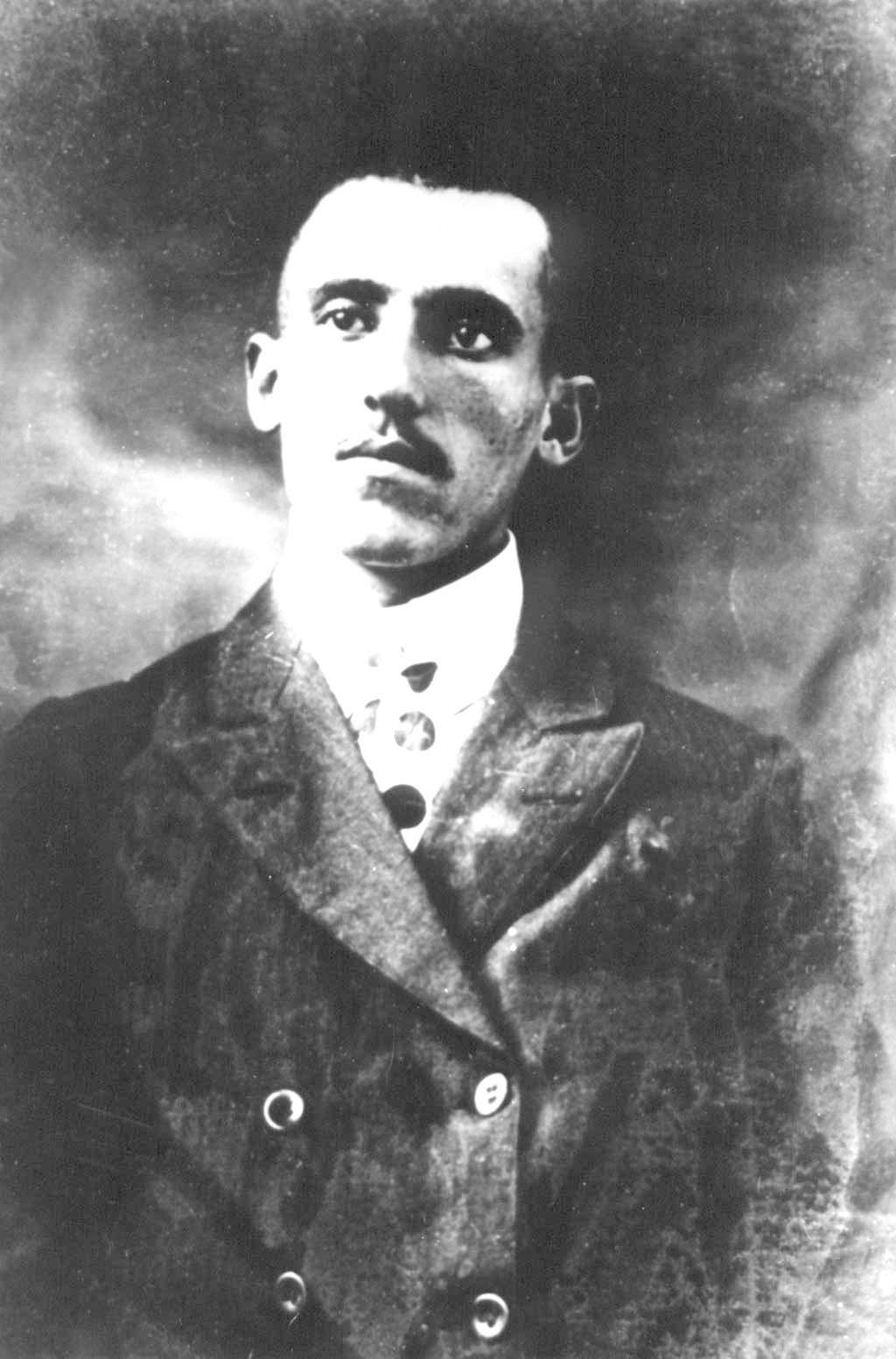
Simón Radowitzky

The first significant test of Falcón's mettle as chief of police was the Tenants' Strike of 1907. Falcón initiated dialogue with strike organizers, who were mainly women and whose demands centered around rising rents and deteriorating conditions in the city's estimated 2,000 tenements. Ultimately, however, talks broke down, and protests associated with the strike was quelled with the use of mounted police armed with sabres. Rent strikers themselves were evicted from their homes in July (a winter month in the Southern Hemisphere) with the use of high-pressure hoses and cold water.

Falcón became known for personally supervising repressive action against protests, and his sabre-wielding officers, as "cossacks." The most violent such confrontation up to then took place during a May Day demonstration organized in 1909 by FORA, an anarchist labor organization. Following an address on Lorea Square by one of the rally's organizers, Federal Police officers charged the crowd and left a tally of 11 dead and over 100 injured. The incident prompted a general strike led by FORA, and the ensuing repression ordered by Falcón resulted in what became known as the Red Week (Spanish: Semana Roja).

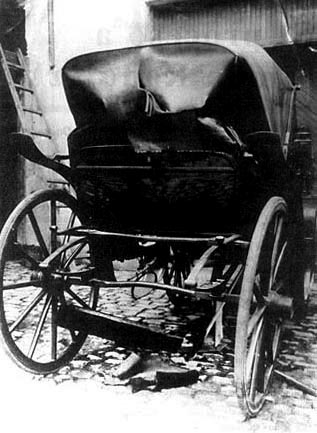
The carriage that took Falcón after being destroyed by the Simón Radowitzky's bomb.

Falcón ordered the dispersal of the crowd of an estimated 60,000 people who had gathered for the funeral cortège for those killed. The 4,000 gathered at Chacarita Cemetery for their burial were likewise dispersed, and the coffins themselves were seized by police. He later ordered La Vanguardia (published by the Socialist Party of Argentina) and La Protesta Humana (published by FORA) closed, and had their printing presses destroyed. FORA and the Socialist UGT were granted an audience with the President of the Argentine Senate, Benito Villanueva, and obtained the commutation of lengthy prison sentences for those arrested (which per municipal statutes carried a term of triple that of similar offenses not committed in the context of a protest). They demanded that Falcón resign, though he refused to do so; members of the Buenos Aires Stock Exchange led a rally in his support as President Figueroa Alcorta commended him for his efforts.

The Chief of Police and his executive secretary, Juan Lartigau, attended the funeral of the Director of the National Penitentiary of Buenos Aires, Antonio Ballvé, on November 14, 1909. As their carriage returned from the service, however, a homemade bomb was thrown therein by a Ukrainian Argentine anarchist militant, Simón Radowitzky. Its two occupants died on the way to hospital, and Falcón was buried at La Recoleta Cemetery.

=== Legacy ===
President Figueroa Alcorta declared a state of siege and, in 1910, signed the Law of Social Defense, which expedited the deportation of those considered "agitators." Radowitzky was sentenced to life imprisonment and remanded to the custody of the National Penitentiary in Ushuaia. He escaped briefly in 1911 and was ordered to submit to solitary confinement for twenty days on each anniversary of Falcón's assassination. Radowitzky's sentence was commuted by President Hipólito Yrigoyen in 1930, and he died in 1956.

Numerous streets in Buenos Aires and a rural town in Coronel Pringles Partido were named in his honor. The police training academy was, however, renamed in 2011 for Juan Ángel Pirker, Chief of Federal Police from 1986 to 1989.
