= El Descamisado (anarchist newspaper) =

- Founded: 6 January 1879
- Political alignment: Anarchism
- Language: Spanish
- City: Buenos Aires
- Country: Argentina

El Descamisado (The Shirtless) was the first anarchist newspaper in Argentina, founded in 1879 and closed in 1887, in Buenos Aires, and played a leading role in the anarchist scene of the time.

== History ==
Its director was Pedro Sanarau. The first issue came out on 6 January 1879 with the subtitle "Red Newspaper". It used red ink in its types, and in the second issue, on 13 January, the reason was explained: "blood-colored ink, with which we wanted to signify that the people have conquered with theirs the right to equality that is denied them".

This newspaper was initially published by the group “Los Desheredados” and later by a group called “La Expropriación”. This newspaper was essential to generate links and initial discussions within Argentine anarchism. Various authors and libertarian militants who passed through Buenos Aires during those years participated in it, such as Rafael Roca, Baldomero Salbans, Manuel and José Reguera, Pierre Quiroule, Jean Raoux, Francisco Denambride, Santiago Locascio and Orsini Menoti Bertani.
