= General Workers' Union (Argentina) =

The General Workers' Union (Spanish: Unión General de Trabajadores, UGT) was an Argentine national labor confederation from 1903 to 1909.

It was founded in 1903 as a rival to the country's first national labor confederation, the Argentine Workers' Federation (FOA), known as the Argentine Regional Workers' Federation (FORA) from 1905. Around this time, the FOA had become more openly anarchist, leading to tension between the socialist syndicalists and the anarchists in the federation. The UGT was thus founded by the former and it was more moderate than its predecessor. Unlike the FOA, it did not discourage participation in elections and encouraged its members to become Argentine citizens - as the majority of the Argentine working class at the time consisted of European immigrants who were thus disenfranchised. Nonetheless, it claimed that general strike "can be an effective means of struggle", but rejected starting it for "violent ends". This position became more radical in the following years as the relations between the syndicalists in the UGT and the Socialist Party became more strained, and in 1906 the UGT declared that the general strike was "an arm of struggle of superior effectiveness".

The UGT had 7,500 members in 1904, membership peaked at 10,000 in 1906. Despite the two organizations' rivalry, there was a lot of cooperation between the FORA and the UGT. Together, they fought against the 1902 Residence Law, which allowed the expulsion of subversive aliens and collaborated on many strikes. On the local level, the cooperation was even more intense. During its last years of existence, the UGT was unable to gain members. Therefore, it merged with the more moderate syndicalists in the FORA in 1909, to form the Argentine Regional Workers' Confederation (CORA).
