= Argentine Regional Workers' Federation =

Anarchist Argentine trade union

- Federación Obrera Regional Argentina
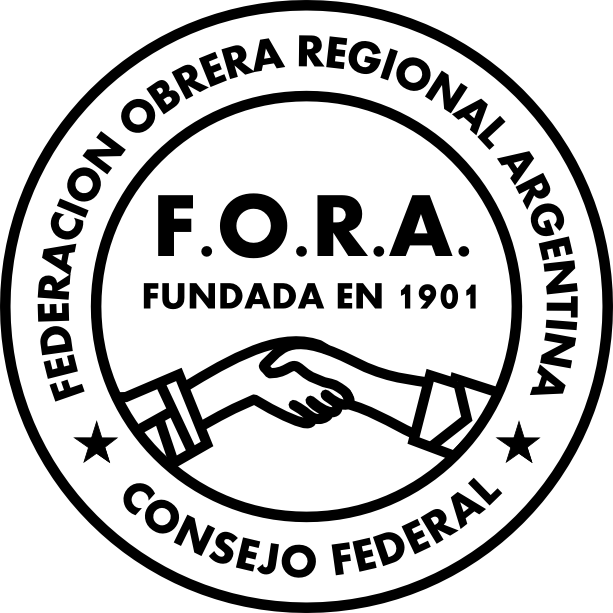

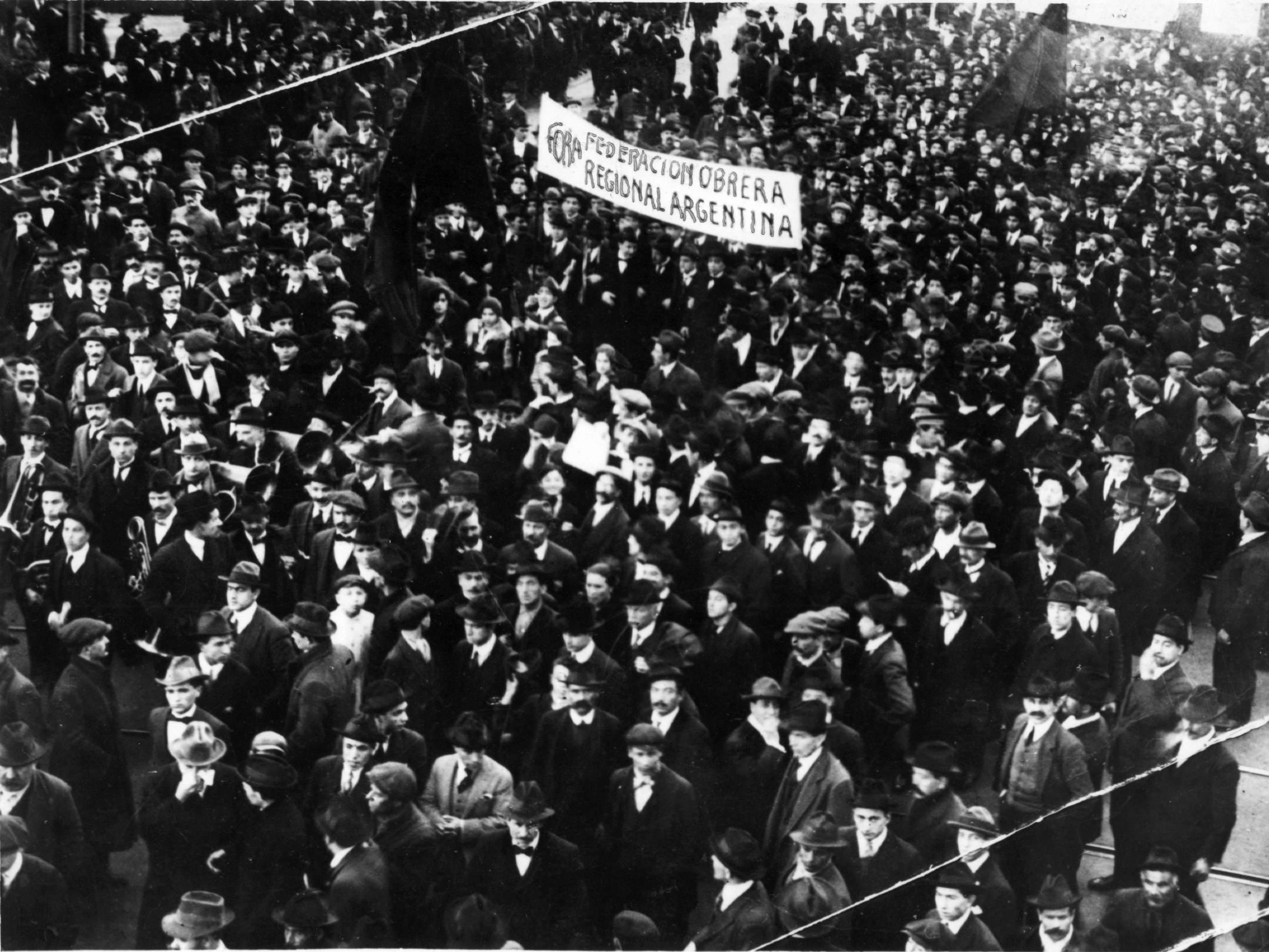
- Demonstration of the FORA around 1915
- Abbreviation: FORA
- Formation: June 2, 1901; 125 years ago
- Type: Trade union
- Headquarters: Buenos Aires
- Location: Argentina
- Website: fora.com.ar

The Argentine Regional Workers' Federation (Spanish: Federación Obrera Regional Argentina; abbreviated FORA), founded in 1901 (125 years ago), was Argentina's first national labor confederation. It split into two wings in 1915, the larger of which merged into the Argentine Syndicates' Union (USA) in 1922, while the smaller slowly disappeared in the 1930s.

== Background ==
From the second half of the 19th century up to around 1920, Argentina experienced rapid economic growth and industrial expansion, becoming a world economic power. Foreign capital was the driving force for this development, with 92% of the workshops and factories in 1887 being owned by non-Argentines, according to a census. Similarly, most of the workers in this period were immigrants; 84% according to the same census.

In 1876, the country's first trade union was founded, and in 1887, the first national labor organization. Both the industrialization of the country and its labor movement were centered on the capital Buenos Aires and by 1896, there were more thirty trade unions in the city alone. From 1896, the labor movement started developing a clear working class program and the first sympathy strikes began taking place.

In the 1880s and 1890s, the anarchist movement in Argentina was divided on the question of participation in the labor movement. The anti-organizers claimed that such participation would cause anarchists to lose their revolutionary edge and become embroiled in reformism. The pro-organizers viewed unions as a weapon in the class struggle. During his 1885–1889 visit to Argentina, Errico Malatesta, an anarchist of international renown, bridged the divide and encouraged anarchist involvement in the labor movement. His departure strengthened the anti-organizers, but this trend was reversed in the mid-1890s. Pietro Gori, an Italian anarchist who immigrated to Argentina in 1898, and Antonio Pellicer Paraire, who arrived from Spain in 1898, were two key figures on the pro-organization side. In a series of articles in 1900 in La Protesta Humana, a newspaper launched in 1897 that bolstered the pro-union anarchists' cause, Pellicer Paraire argued for a dual organizational structure for anarchists, composed of a labor federation and a specifically anarchist political organization.

The extent of anarchism's influence in the labor movement is disputed: Ronaldo Munck claims that the "dominant tendency in the labour movement was [...] represented by the anarchists of various persuasions", while Ruth Thompson holds that "a closer examination of Argentine trade unions around the turn of the century suggests that the importance of anarchism has been exaggerated", and Roberto P. Korzeniewicz contends "that anarchism was not as prevalent within the labour movement in Argentina around the turn of the century as studies of the period have generally maintained", although he concedes that "anarchism achieved greater labour support during the early 1900s". In any case, there was considerable anarchist union activity in the 1890s. Most of the European immigration to South America as a whole came from Spain and Italy, the two European countries in which anarchism was most influential. These immigrants included anarchists forced to flee their native countries for political reasons. The working class was hardly integrated into the political system at the time, with 70% of the adult males in Buenos Aires disenfranchised as foreigners in 1912.

== Formation and early years ==
On May 25 and 26 and June 2, 1901, fifty delegates, both anarchists and socialists, representing between twenty-seven and thirty-five unions met at a congress in the capital to form the Argentine Workers' Federation (FOA), with no more than 10,000 members initially. Most of the unions that joined the FOA came from construction or professions mainly practiced in small artisans' workshops such as bakers or furniture makers. Modern industrial workers were absent, while some came from the transport sector and ports. During the congress, socialists and pro-organization anarchists, particularly Gori and Pellicer Paraire, repeatedly disagreed on several issues, with the latter in a stronger position. The organization's founding principles reflected this. The principles proclaimed working class solidarity to be the only means of liberating workers, with the general strike their ultimate weapon in their fight against capital. Accordingly, the principles rejected party politics as a means of abolishing capitalism. However, they also accepted collective bargaining and arbitration, but not by the government, for settling labor disputes and pushing for labor legislation. The unionists decided that May 1 would be observed as a day of protest. The congress elected a ten-headed administrative committee composed of six anarchists, two socialists, one member who only declared himself an anarchist in 1902, and another delegate who did not commit to a particular ideology.

During the first year of the FOA's existence, disagreements between socialists and anarchists continued. The founding congress had decided that La Organización was to serve as the Federation's official organ, but then the newspaper's socialist editors refused to allow this. In September, the twelve socialist-oriented unions in charge of the newspaper declared that they regretted having agreed to the Federation taking over their publication. The coming-together of anarchists with socialists and moderates ended after one year. At the FOA's second congress, a dispute over the admission of delegates who were not members of the unions they represented escalated into chaotic and angry shouting and the moderates left. The socialists' departure left the anarchists in full control of the Federation. They decided to end cooperation with the Socialist Party and to employ boycotts in labor disputes. The moderates formed the General Workers' Union (UGT) as a rival union federation in 1903.

A cycle of class struggles from 1902 to 1908 followed the formation of the FOA. This wave of strikes was not so much a result of the labor movement's ideology as of increased immigration and rising costs of living. A 1902 strike by the stevedores in Rosario turned into a general strike. In November of the same year, the Buenos Aires dock workers gained the nine-hour-day. The most important strike of this year, that of the fruit handlers, was about to involve the whole membership of the FOA at the height of the harvest, but the government passed the Residence Law—which allowed the expulsion of subversive foreigners—to break it. In 1903 and 1904, Argentina saw no less than twelve general strikes and many more at individual plants, with the FOA being involved in many of them. At the 1903 FOA May Day demonstration, a clash with police left two dead and twenty-four wounded. At a bakers' strike in Rosario, one worker was shot by police.

== 1905 congress and further radicalization ==
At the FOA's fifth congress in 1905, it renamed itself FORA, the Argentine Regional Workers' Federation, to express its anti-nationalism. It also passed a resolution declaring "[t]hat it advises and recommends the widest possible study and propaganda to all its adherents with the object of teaching the workers the economic and philosophical principles of anarchist communism" becoming the programmatic basis of the union for the following years and reflecting the radicalization of the preceding. Anarchist communism became the sole doctrine in the FORA, causing statist socialists to leave the union.

The FORA continued to grow quite rapidly, reaching a peak at 30,000 members in 1906. In 1909, however, its moderate wing left the organization to found the Argentine Regional Workers' Confederation (CORA) with syndicalists from the UGT.

At the First International Syndicalist Congress in London in 1913, both the FORA and the CORA were represented. Because the FORA could not afford the long trip and because of a lack of time, it did not send a delegate of its own, but gave its mandate to the Italian Alceste De Ambris. The FORA considered the congress a great success and was confident it would lead to the founding of a "purely worker and anti-statist" international.

== 1915 congress and split ==
The FORA's ninth congress, in April 1915, reversed the avowal to anarcho-communism of the fifth. It did not "pronounce itself officially favorable to, nor advise the adoption of, philosophical systems or determined ideologies", effectively renouncing anarchist communism. The move was complemented by the unification of the CORA and the FORA. However, not all agreed on this new set of principles. A minority left the FORA and founded the FORA V, as it stuck to the resolution from the fifth congress. The majority FORA became known as the FORA IX, as it was founded at the ninth congress.

The FORA V, whose membership peaked at 10,000, was strongest in the interior of the country, where it retained considerable economic power well into the 1920s.

With its cautious and pragmatic approach, the FORA IX grew rapidly. Though figures are generally unreliable, it claimed a membership of 100,000 to 120,000 by 1919. In a time of economic recession and falling wages, as the result of World War I, it was more intent on defending past achievements, rather than starting risky struggles. During a railway strike in 1917, the FORA V decided to go on the offensive by calling for a general strike, but it was quickly defeated as very few unions participated.

On January 7, 1919, a strike by an anarchist union with tenuous links to the FORA V in Nueva Pompeya led to a shootout between workers and police, troops, and firemen, killing five. Two days later, the police ambushed the 200,000 workers on their way to La Chacarita Cemetery leading to the death of another 39 men. The FORA V had called a general strike after the events on January 7, the FORA IX followed on January 9. On January 11, the FORA IX reached an agreement with the Nueva Pompeya industrialists, who were pressured by the Interior Ministry. In turn, the government agreed to release all prisoners taken during the strikes. As a reaction to the workers' actions, business and military leaders formed the vigilante Argentine Patriotic League. Unimpeded by the government, it attacked labor organizations and militants. In all, between 100 and 700 people died during what became known as the Tragic Week or la Semana Trágica in Spanish.

The outrage over this event caused another peak in strike activity in 1919 with 397 strikes involving over 300,000 workers in Buenos Aires alone. While the FORA IX claimed to have learned its lesson from the Tragic Week and the failed railworkers' strike in 1917, the FORA V experienced a short revival in strength during this year.

In August 1910, the FORA IX was able to defeat a proposal for a new labor law, which would have undermined the improvements in working conditions the labor movement had achieved over the past years, with a huge demonstration in Buenos Aires. Although the organization had previously passed a resolution to bar any individuals holding posts in political parties from doing so in the union federation as well, it now collaborated with socialist party politicians.

== Final years ==
The founding of the Bolshevist Red International of Labor Unions (RILU) in 1920 caused serious discussions within both FORA organizations. Five out of fifteen committee members quit their positions after the FORA IX refused to join the RILU at its January 1921 conference, and the FORA V was split between a pro and an anti-Bolshevik wing before the latter faction was expelled from the union in 1921. In 1921 workers with FORA were killed in the La Forestal massacre.

Following lengthy negotiations between the FORA IX and a number of hitherto independent trade unions, the Argentine Syndicates' Union (USA) was founded in March 1922. The pro-Bolshevists from the FORA V also joined. Having the support of socialists, communists, and syndicalists, the USA was more radical than the FORA IX and therefore joined neither the social democratic International Federation of Trade Unions nor the RILU.

Meanwhile, the anarchist FORA V was in steady decline. It was dissolved shortly before the installation of José Félix Uriburu's military dictatorship. This FORA was subsequently formed again and exists to this day as a member of the International Workers' Association (the anarcho-syndicalist international).
