= Greenshields =

Greenshields is a surname. Notable people with the surname include:

- Allan Greenshields (1926–2016), Australian rules footballer
- Clint Greenshields (born 1982), Australian rugby league player
- Frank Greenshields (born 1941), English cricketer
- Joel Greenshields (born 1988), Canadian swimmer
- John Gordon Greenshields (1882–1929), Canadian businessman
- Karen Greenshields, Scottish television presenter
- R.A.E. Greenshields (1861–1942), Canadian judge

== See also ==
- Greenshields Peak, a mountain of Graham Land, Antarctica
- Greenshields, Alberta, a hamlet in Alberta, Canada
