= Cemetery of Punta Arenas =

Cemetery in Chile

Cementerio Municipal Sara Braun
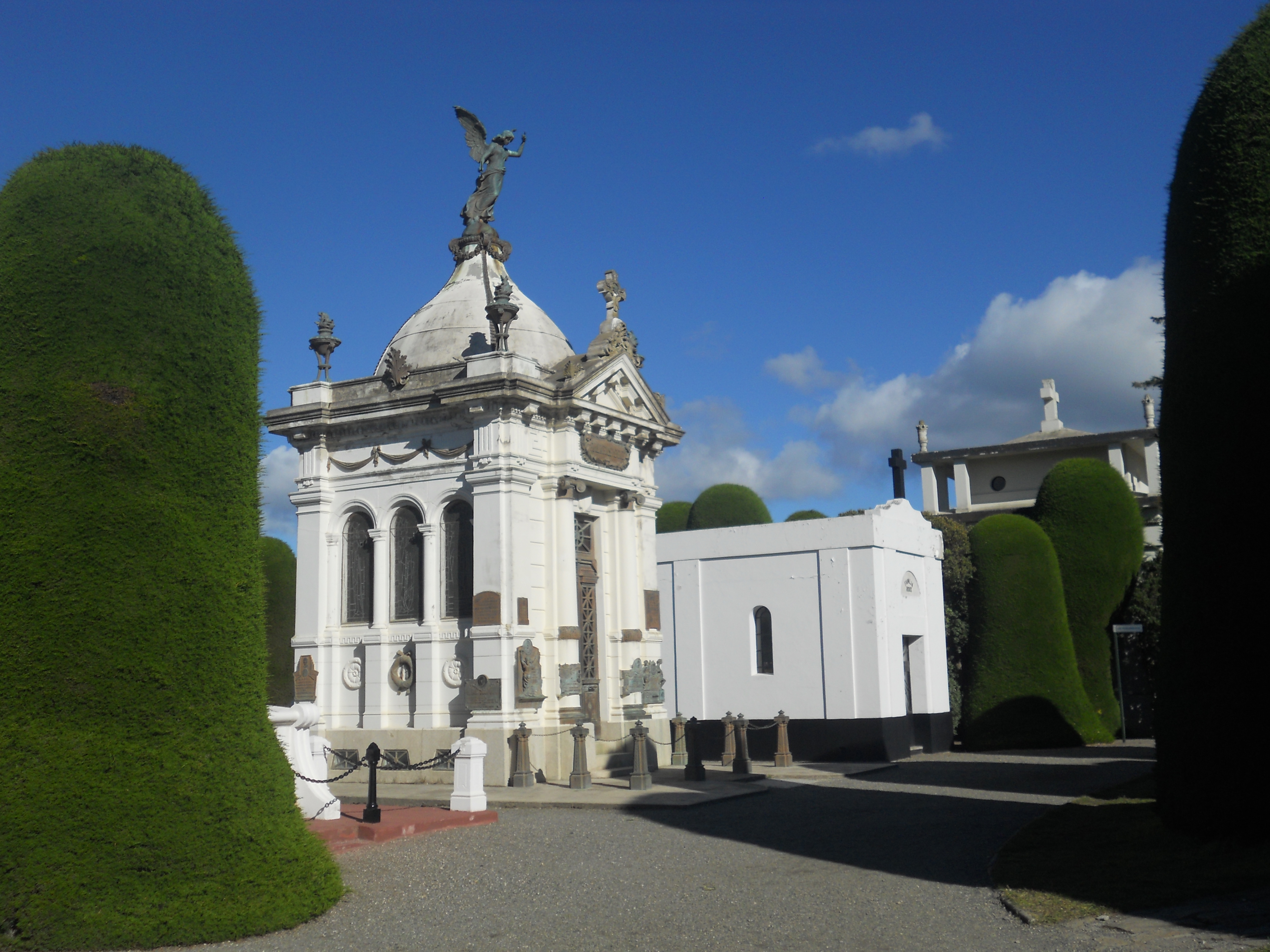

Details
- Location: Avenida Bulnes 29, Punta Arenas
- Country: Chile
- Coordinates: 53°09′10″S 70°53′51″W
- Type: Public
- Size: 4 hectares (9.9 acres)

Cemetery of Punta Arenas Sara Braun is the public cemetery of the city of Punta Arenas, Chile. It is established on four hectares and is located in the northern area of the city, in Bulnes Avenue, between the streets Francisco Bilbao and Angamos. There are three entrances: the main entrance is in Bulnes Avenue, and two other entrances are in Francisco Bilbao and Angamos streets. Since the cemetery had long ago reached its capacity, it has been supplemented and largely replaced by a controversial newer cemetery further to the north of the city, though the earlier site retains its status as a "monument cemetery."

The cemetery has been ranked by CNN as one of the most beautiful cemeteries in the world. It was designated a National Monument of Chile in 2012.

== Origins ==
Under the administration of the Governor Manuel Señoret, the cemetery was inaugurated on 9 April 1894. This saint field was built in order to replace the old one, which was located where Lautaro square is today. The area was donated by the pioneer Sara Braun and in 1919 the engineer Fortunato Circutti designed the whole gates and walls that surround the cemetery.

== Important characters ==
Relevant figures in the history of Punta Arenas are buried in the cemetery of that city. It is important to mention the chapels of the great families of that epoch such as Menèndez-Behety, Braun Hamburger, Blanchard, Greenshields, Kusanovic and Menèndez-Montes. Menèndez-Behety was one of the most influential families during that time and they founded several companies and acquired large tracts of land in the Chilean Patagonia.

Antonio Soto, one of the leaders of the Patagonia Rebelde labor uprising in Argentina, is also buried in the cemetery.

Charles Amherst Milward, a British sailor and the inspiration behind Bruce Chatwin's travel classic In Patagonia, is buried here.

== Legends ==
The cemetery of Punta Arenas is well known because of its attractive legends that transform the place into a magical environment of mystery. Some of the urban legends associated with the site are:

- When Sara Braun gave everything for building the entrance of the cemetery, she asked for something. After her death, the central door of the cemetery had to be closed forever. Nowadays, that door is still closed and has not been opened since Sara Braun's death. Another legend about Braun is that she is uninterred each year on 1 November to have her makeup redone and hair styled.
- Another known legend of the cemetery is the one concerning the “Indio Desconocido”. Everything started in 1930 when an Indian died in the Island called Diego de Almagro. The Indian was buried in the cemetery due to a donation from the administration of the same place. After twenty years, someone discovered several candles and coins around the grave. The years passed by and in 1968 the grave were plenty of papers demonstrating gratitude for being helped by the Indian. Moreover, a woman named Magdalena Vrsalovic decided to donate the coins, in order to help the Cruz Roja of Punta Arenas, a Chilean Institution that helps the community in case of difficulties. Therefore, Magdalena and other people agreed to build a monumental grave with the figure of the Indian made by Edmundo Casanova.
