= Esther Porter =

Ukrainian-Argentine anarchist (1900–1935)

- אסתר פורטער
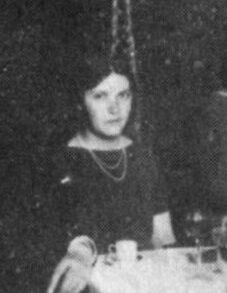
- Born: Esther Polinska c. 1900; Odesa, Russian Empire (now Ukraine)
- Died: 1935 (aged 34–35); Monte, Argentina
- Movement: Anarchism in Argentina
- Spouse: Ismael Pedro Viñas
- Children: Ismael and David Viñas

Esther Porter (née Polinska; c. 1900–1935) was a Ukrainian Jewish anarchist who was active in Argentina during the early 20th century. She participated in the events known as the Patagonia Rebelde and later became the mother of intellectuals Ismael and David Viñas.

== Biography ==
=== Background ===
Esther Polinska (Yiddish: אסתר פאלינסקא) came from a Ukrainian Jewish family that emigrated to Argentina in the mid-1900s, fleeing their home city of Odesa, which was a target of the pogroms in the Russian Empire. The family landed in Argentina after being denied entry to the United States because one member was ill. Because she emigrated as a child, aged about four or five, the youngest of four sisters, she retained little of her native language or culture as an adult. Upon entering Argentina, her father changed his surname from Polinsky to Portes.

=== Life in Santa Cruz ===
In 1919, Porter moved to the city of Río Gallegos. She went there together with her partner, the radical lawyer Ismael Pedro Viñas, who was about 15 years her senior, who had been sent there as a judge-advocate. Viñas was an influential figure in the local justice system, as he was the first to openly confront the estancieros, who held the de facto power in the territory of Santa Cruz. He was also a major player during the series of strikes and social conflicts that took place in Santa Cruz between 1920 and 1921, commonly known as the Patagonia Rebelde, which was repressed by the Argentine army, which killed roughly 1,500 rural workers.

In this sparsely populated town, located at the southern tip of Patagonia, the fact that the territory's legal judge was living with Esther Porter, without being married, was considered unheard of. This, together with some of Esther Porter's liberal attitudes, such as going to the cinema alone, meant that she was seen as a woman of advanced ideas. In turn, these attitudes and her anarchist ideas led to enmity between her partner and the interim governor Edelmiro Correa Falcón, who at the same time was secretary of the Río Gallegos Rural Society. This, together with the fact that Viñas soon began to investigate acts of corruption involving some livestock companies and members of the territory's rural societies, led to a notorious institutional conflict between the governor's office and the court.

According to Esther Porter's eldest son, it was she who made Viñas aware of the injustices suffered by the Patagonian workers and the exploitation to which they were subjected by the big landowners:

According to what my father told us much later, when my mother went to visit the prisoners in the police station, one of them [Pedro Mogilnitzky] stood up, greeted her in Russian, kissed her hand in the most ceremonious European manner, and told her the 'truth'. That they were not criminals, but workers who had organised themselves to fight against exploitation, and that was why they had been arrested.

=== Final years in Monte ===
Porter and Viñas finally married in 1925, when she was pregnant with their first child, Ismael Viñas, who would grow up to become a writer and Marxist intellectual. The following year they moved to Buenos Aires. In 1927 their second son, David Viñas, who would later become a renowned writer and literary critic, was born. Soon after, they moved to Monte, where they suffered political persecution from right-wing groups during the Infamous Decade. There, her children would recall that she defended her house from attacks by armed gangs, and confronted conservative supporters who harassed her husband, a known radical militant. In 1935 she died unexpectedly at the age of 35.

== Legacy ==
Esther Porter's untimely death left a deep mark on her two sons, Ismael and David, which was reflected in their literary works and various interviews they gave throughout their lives. In the book Los dueños de la tierra by David Viñas, one of the main and most important female characters, Yuda Singer, is clearly inspired by her. This was confirmed on several occasions by David Viñas, who recognised several similarities between the two. In turn, this same character represents the ideological alter ego of Judge Vera, who is the main figure in the work, who has been interpreted as representing either his father or David's own alter ego. This author idealised the figure of his mother and her rebellious character, which is reflected not only in the female character in this book, but also in other literary works written by him.

In Osvaldo Bayer's work, La Patagonia Rebelde, Porter appears only as the partner of the judge Ismael Viñas, depicted as not having play any significant role herself. However, according to her children, she played important a role in the events. When she died, several Santa Cruz workers who survived the army massacres sent her widower a bronze memorial plaque for her grave, but he refused to put it in place, for fear that it would be vandalised.

== Bibliography ==
- Bayer, Osvaldo (1992). La Patagonia Rebelde (in Spanish). Vol. 1. Buenos Aires: Editorial Planeta Espejo de la Argentina.
- Ferrante, Betina (2016). "Los dueños de la tierra: Contorno, frontera y posmemoria". Revista del Centro de Letras Hispanoamericanas (in Spanish). 25 (32): 17–30. ISSN 0328-5766.
- Mizraje, María Gabriela (2014). "David Viñas o la piedra de toque". El Matadero (in Spanish). 8: 77–90. ISSN 0329-9546.
- Moreno, María (1984). "¡Mujeres! Dijo David Viñas" (PDF). Alfonsina (in Spanish). 6: 10–12.
- Roca, Pilar (2005). Ismael Viñas. Ideografía de un mestizo (in Spanish). Buenos Aires: Editorial Dunken.
- Roca Escalante, Pilar (2005). "Ismael Viñas: Ética, exilio y producción cultural". Jornadas de Historia de las Izquierdas. Exiliados Políticos Argentinos y Latinoamericanos (in Spanish). 3: 13–20.
- Sosnowski, Samuel (1975). "«Los dueños de la tierra», de David Viñas: Cuestionamiento e impugnación del liberalismo". Caravelle. Cahiers du monde hispanique et luso-brésilien (in Spanish). 25 (1): 57–75. ISSN 2272-9828.
- Viñas, Ismael Aarón (2005). Montes-Bradley, Nelson (ed.). Memoria de mis padres, parientes y amigos. Memorias familiares y del entorno familiar de Ismael Viñas (in Spanish). Miami: Ediciones MB. ISBN 9781440439896.
- Zangredi, Marcos (2015). "Territorios de la familia. Propiedad y biopolítica en David Viñas". Cuadernos de Literatura (in Spanish). 19 (38): 400–413. doi:10.11144/Javeriana.cl19-38.tfpb. hdl:11336/112820.
- Zubimendi, Miguel Angel (2023). "Escenas de la vida política y social en la Santa Cruz de comienzos del siglo XX a través de la trayectoria de Pedro Mogilnitzky, un dirigente sindical devenido estanciero". Atek Na (in Spanish). 12: 169–211.
