= Rebellion in Patagonia =

1974 Argentine film

- Directed by: Héctor Olivera
- Screenplay by: Héctor Olivera; Fernando Ayala; Osvaldo Bayer
- Based on: Los Vengadores de la Patagonia Trágica by Osvaldo Bayer
- Produced by: Fernando Ayala
- Starring: Héctor Alterio; Luis Brandoni; Federico Luppi; José Soriano; Fernando Iglesias 'Tacholas'
- Cinematography: Victor Hugo Caula
- Edited by: Oscar Montauti
- Music by: Óscar Cardozo Ocampo
- Distributed by: Tricontinental Film Center (United States)
- Release date: 13 June 1974
- Running time: 110 min.
- Country: Argentina
- Language: Spanish

Rebellion in Patagonia (Spanish: La Patagonia rebelde) is a 1974 Argentine drama-historical film directed by Héctor Olivera and starring Héctor Alterio, Luis Brandoni, José Soriano and Federico Luppi. The screenplay was written by Olivera with Osvaldo Bayer and Fernando Ayala, based on Bayer's renowned novel Los vengadores de la Patagonia Trágica ("The Avengers of Tragic Patagonia"), which was based upon the military suppression of anarchist union movements in Santa Cruz Province in 1921.

The film was entered into the 24th Berlin International Film Festival, where it won the Silver Bear.

It was selected as the second greatest Argentine film of all time in a poll conducted by the Museo del Cine Pablo Ducrós Hicken in 1984, while it ranked 3rd in the 2000 edition. In a new version of the survey organized in 2022 by the specialized magazines La vida util, Taipei and La tierra quema, presented at the Mar del Plata International Film Festival, the film reached the 25 position. Also in 2022, the film was included in Spanish magazine Fotogramas's list of the 20 best Argentine films of all time.

== Plot ==
The film begins in January 1923 in Buenos Aires, with the assassination of Lieutenant Coronel Zavala (Note: Osvaldo Bayer and the other writers of the script were compelled to use a fictitious name to avoid potential lawsuits by the family of the officer who carried out the massacre in real life (Lieutenant Colonel Héctor Benigno Varela). The same criteria were applied to other characters and the military unit involved in the events.) in a gun and bomb attack by an anarchist militant when the army officer walks to work early in the morning, after waking up haunted by a nightmare of gunshots and screams. The crime is committed presumably in retaliation for the brutal repression of anarchist strikers in Patagonia some months before.

Then the story jumps back to 1920 in Rio Gallegos, Santa Cruz Province, Patagonia, where a group of ranch hands, influenced by anarcho-syndicalist ideas, demand improvements in pay and conditions. During one of the meetings, a boss pays back the workers salaries and an additional fee. He takes the money out of his wallet which illustrates that to the boss it is simply pocket change whereas to the workers it is a lot of money. After employers initially agree to the laborers' demands, which are supported by workers in other sectors and areas, the regional governor, under pressure from local employers and landowners, orders the paramilitary police to intervene to suppress union and political activity, despite the protests of a local judge. In response to such harassment, a general strike is declared, paralyzing the ports and wool production for export. The national Radical Civic Union government supports the workers' rights, and the employees call for union recognition and improvements to the conditions of ranch hands. Employers reject the demands and bring in scabs, but the convoys are attacked by armed strikers who shoot at the gendarms guarding them. The protestors use arson and sabotage to disrupt production and take hostages. More fighting erupts between militarised policemen and strikers.

An army- and judge-led mediation attempt commissioned by President Hipólito Yrigoyen and led by Lieutenant Coronel Zavala condemns police partiality and the exploitative nature of the company store system. After six weeks, the strike is settled in the workers' favor with the first ever collective agreement for Patagonian rural workers and they hand in many of the weapons they seized from the rural estates as part of the agreement. Employers are outraged by having the unfavorable terms imposed on them by the government and respond with selective sackings and denial of service at company stores. Workers respond with boycotts and the president dismisses the governor, who is close to many of the wealthy landowners. More importantly, the landowners refuse to implement the pay rise specified in the agreement.

With workers planning another strike to enforce the terms of the agreement, employers, backed by Chile and Britain, successfully convince the government to round up union leaders and militants. Another general strike is called in response. While strikers take hostages to defend themselves, a gang of common criminals known as the Red Council, who had previously taken part in the attack on the convoy of strikebreakers and refused to disarm, take advantage of the unsettled situation to raid isolated estates.

Back in Buenos Aires, Zavala is told by Interior Minister Ramón Gómez of the continuing unrest despite his efforts, that the workers had not upheld their compromise to laid down weapons, and to "Think of Chile", implying a threat to Argentina's border integrity. Zavala decides to restore order in Patagonia in such a way as to permanently remove the threat of another anarchist rebellion. Zavala orders his troops to open fire on strikers at sight, taking by surprise those who had held him in high regard for settling the earlier dispute in their favor. The colonel carries out summary executions by firing squad of those captured alive, especially of leaders and even of full delegations acting under a flag of truce. Some of them are made to dig their own graves. The death of a conscript during an exchange of fire with the strikers in a railway station further enrages Zavala, to the point that he breaks a previous promise to spare the lives of those who voluntarily submit to the authorities. The Red Council, actually a band of marauders with no ideology, are also captured in a homestead they were raiding at the same time that the anarcho-syndicalists decide to surrender to Zavala. Armed landowners participate in the elimination of the strikers by identifying the ringleaders among the mass of prisoners; the movement's key figures are executed, with only one (Soto) managing to escape to Chile. Others, accused of looting, are tied naked to fences in sub-zero temperatures or made to run the gauntlet. Ironically, the outlaws of the Red Council are formally arrested and get trial under normal proceedings.

After the slaughter, the previous agreement is rescinded and wages are reduced. The film ends with oligarchs congratulating Colonel Zavala during a celebration and singing For He's a Jolly Good Fellow in English, while the camera shows the embarrassment on Zavala's face, as he realises the very interests he had been working for.

== Cast ==
- Pedro Aleandro - Félix Novas
- Héctor Alterio - Col. Zavala
- Luis Brandoni - Antonio Soto
- Franklin Caicedo - Farina 'el chileno'
- Horacio Dener - Ranch hand
- José María Gutiérrez - Governor Méndez Garzón
- Alfredo Iglesias - Interior Minister Ramón Gómez
- Fernando Iglesias 'Tacholas' - Graña 'El español'
- Maurice Jouvet - Don Federico
- Claudio Lucero - Comisario Pedro Micheri
- Federico Luppi - José Font, 'Facon Grande'
- Carlos Muñoz - Don Bernardo
- Eduardo Muñoz - Carballeira
- Héctor Pellegrini - Capitán Arzeno
- Jorge Rivera López - Edward Mathews
- Walter Santa Ana - Hotel's owner
- José Soriano - Schultz, the German
- Osvaldo Terranova - Outerello
- Jorge Villalba - Florentino Cuello 'El gaucho'

== See also ==
- Anarchism in Argentina
- List of films dealing with anarchism
- Quebracho (film)
- Letters from Marusia
