= Kurt Wilckens =

German–Argentine anarchist (1886–1923)

Kurt Gustav Wilckens
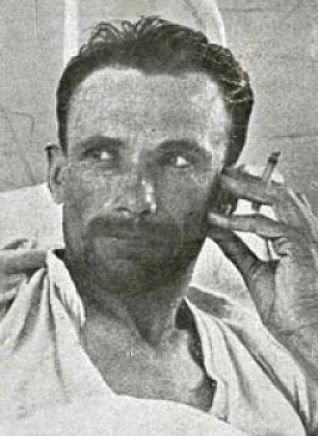
- Born: November 3, 1886; Bad Bramstedt, Schleswig-Holstein, German Empire
- Died: June 15, 1923 (aged 36); Buenos Aires, Argentina
- Cause of death: Assassination by gunshot
- Occupations: writer, journalist
- Known for: Assassination of Héctor Benigno Varela
- Movement: Anarchism
- Parent(s): Johanna Harms and August Wilckens

Kurt Gustav Wilckens (November 3, 1886 – June 15, 1923) was a German anarchist, known in Argentina for having avenged the massacre of hundreds of workers on strike in the repression unleashed by the Argentine government in response to the prolonged Patagonia rebelde labor uprising. Wilckens assassinated Lieutenant Colonel Héctor Benigno Varela, the military leader in charge of the brutal repression. He was arrested at the scene. As the guard overpowered him, he exclaimed, "I have avenged my brothers!"

Wilckens was quickly put on trial for murder, found guilty, and sentenced to 17 years in prison. At his trial, Wilckens said he had acted alone, and shot Varela to prevent him from killing anyone else. The sentence was deemed too lenient by the military and Argentine right. On the night of 15 June 1923, prison guards smuggled in Jorge Ernesto Pérez Millán Témperley, a former police sergeant who was a member of the Argentine Patriotic League, a far-right political party formed after the strike. Millán approached Wilckens as he was sleeping and shot him in the chest. The bullet pierced a lung, and Wilckens died the following morning. News of his murder caused outrage by workers in Germany and Argentina. A protest rally was held by the Free Workers' Union of Germany, and widespread strikes occurred in Argentina.

Millán was found guilty of murdering Wilckens and sentenced to eight years in prison. However, he was then declared mentally unstable and sent to a psychiatric ward. Due to frequent death threats, sympathizers got him transferred to a comfortable hospice. However, on 9 November 1925, Millán himself was mortally wounded by Esteban Lucich, a mentally unstable anarchist and convicted murderer who'd been working for him as a servant. He'd been reading a letter from Manuel Carlés, the leader of the Patriotic League and a personal friend, when Lucich came in and took the tray. He then pulled out a revolver and said, "This is from Wilckens," before shooting Millán in the chest. Millán died of his injuries the next day.

== See also ==
- Anarchism in Argentina
- Propaganda of the deed

== Bibliography ==
- Bayer, Osvaldo (2015) [1975]. The Anarchist Expropriators: Buenaventura Durruti and Argentina's Working-Class Robin Hoods. Oakland, California: AK Press. ISBN 978-1-84935-223-9. OCLC 908088288.
- Osvaldo Bayer, La Patagonia rebelde, Tomo IV. Booket, Buenos Aires, 2007.
