= Facón Grande =

Argentine syndicalist labor organizer (1883–1921)

José Font
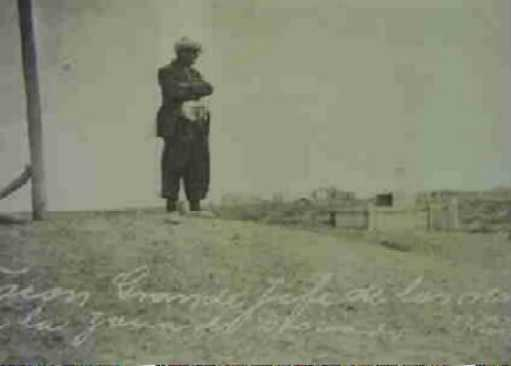
- Last photo of Facón Grande, before being executed
- Born: 1883; Concepción del Uruguay, Entre Ríos Province, Argentina
- Died: 22 December 1921 (aged 38); Jaramillo, Santa Cruz, Argentina
- Cause of death: Execution by firing squad
- Other names: Facón Grande
- Occupation: Land worker
- Organization: FORA
- Known for: Patagonia Rebelde
- Movement: Anarchism; Syndicalism
- Criminal penalty: Capital Punishment

José Font, better known as Facón Grande (lit. "Big Knife"), (1883–22 December 1921) was an Argentine worker and syndicalist known for his leading role in Patagonia Rebelde, a rural workers' uprising in Patagonia, Argentina.

== Biography ==
Font arrived in Santa Cruz between 1904 and 1905 to work at salt evaporation ponds in Cabo Blanco, and a little afterwards started working as a day labourer near Puerto Deseado. He had never gone to school.

Osvaldo Bayer, based on reports, defined him as a "quiet and obliging man, a cart driver by trade, those who make eight Percheron horses obey with a whistle." Font had cars and flats in Cañadón León (currently the town of Gobernador Gregores) and was in charge of transporting leather and wool. According to Bayer, Facón Grande was:

the most respected carrero by all ranchers due to his honesty and generosity. He never paid attention to the pesos and was open-handed to those who came to ask him for help. All the testimonies gathered are in agreement in affirming that he was a good man, upright, humble (...) none of the old residents of Deseado who knew him hesitated to describe him as a decent and beloved person. He dressed like a civilian, bombachas and alpargatas, a wide black sash at the waist with a crossed facón, which he never used against men...

=== Patagonia Rebelde ===
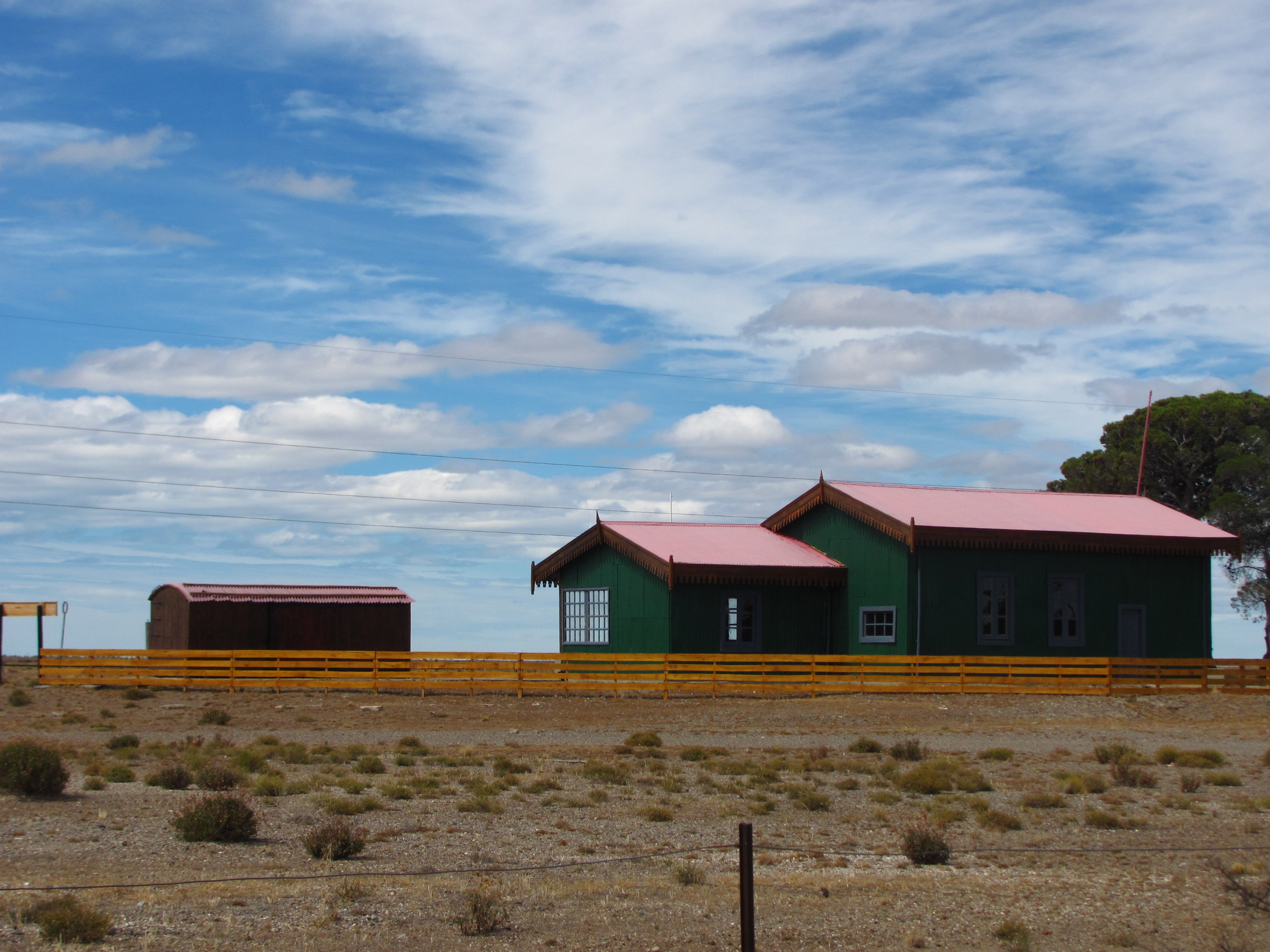
Current view of the Jaramillo station.

During the workers' strike known as Patagonia Rebelde, Facón Grande coordinated the strikers' movements in the area between Puerto Deseado and Las Heras, on the Patagonian Railroad line. On December 21, an armed confrontation took place between the Argentine Army under the command of Lieutenant Colonel Héctor Benigno Varela and the strikers led by Font in the vicinity of the Tehuelches station. A soldier and three strikers died there, while another soldier and several workers were injured.

After the battle, the army proposed to the workers that they surrender, promising to respect everyone's lives and agree to their demands if they surrendered. After an assembly, the workers decided to turn themselves in. However, the promise was not kept, and many workers, including Font, were executed.

== Homage ==
The hotel of the Argentine Union of Rural Workers and Stevedores in Buenos Aires bears the name of Facón Grande.

On 8 October 1999, in the area where he was assassinated, a monument was inaugurated in his memory.

In the 1974 film La Patagonia Rebelde, Federico Luppi played José Font.

In 2021, a museum was opened and named after him in the village of Jaramillo -near the place where he was killed one hundred years earlier- in the old Puerto Deseado Railway station, where the events of the Patagonia Rebelde can be learned.

== Gallery ==
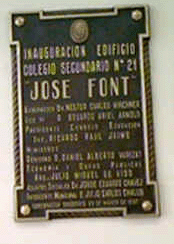
Plaque at the secondary school José Font.

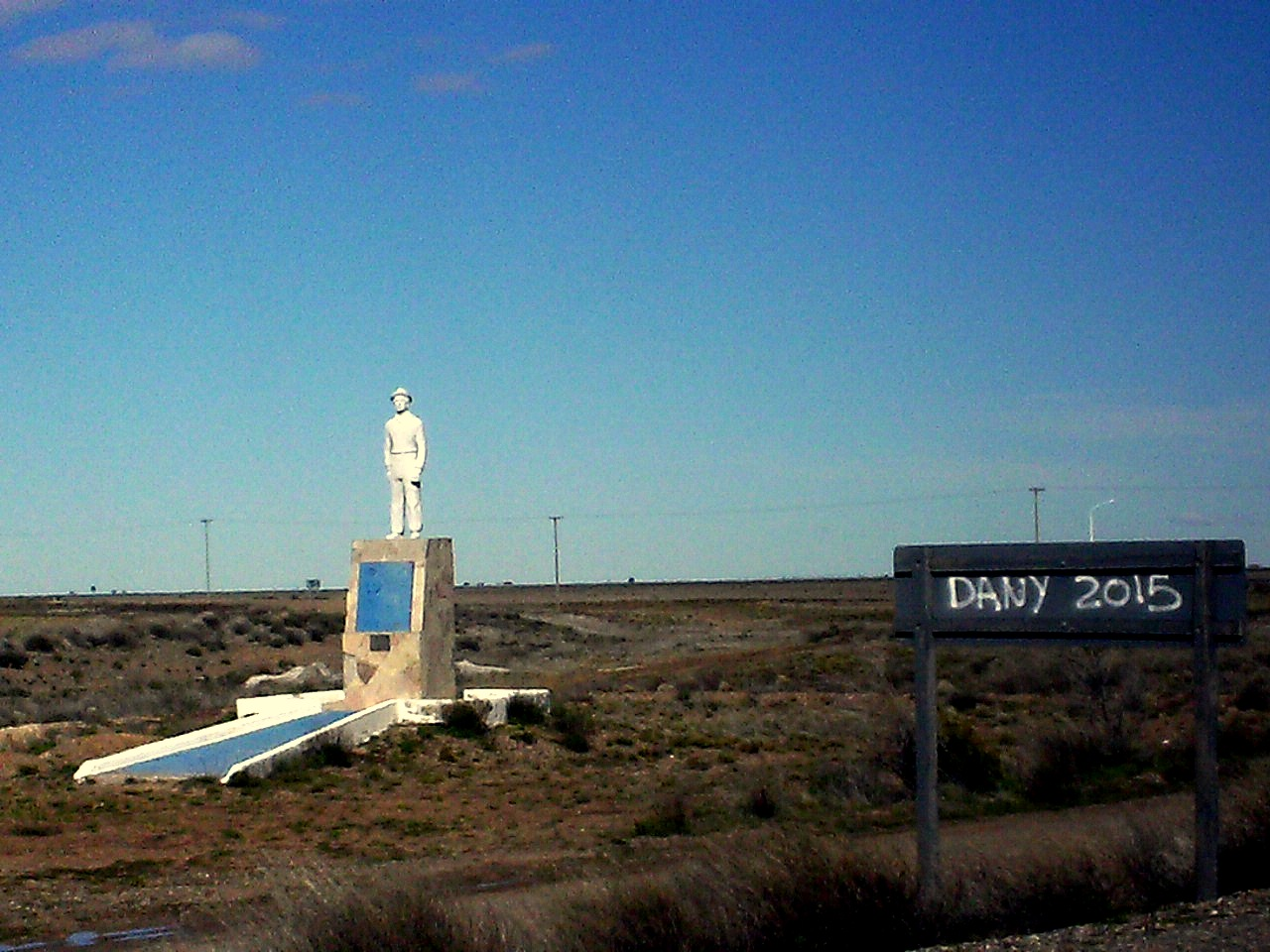
Monument near Jaramillo

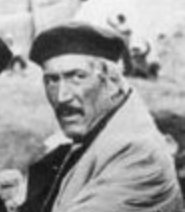
Federico Luppi, in the role of Facón Grande, in La Patagonia Rebelde, 1974.

== See also ==
- Anarchism in Argentina
- Antonio Soto
