= John Gordon Greenshields =

Canadian investment dealer (1882–1929)

- Born: 8 March 1882; Montreal, Quebec
- Died: 18 December 1929 (aged 47); Danville, Quebec
- Education: Bishop's College School; McGill University

John Gordon Greenshields (8 March 1882 – 18 December 1929) was a Canadian engineer and investment dealer. Greenshields was born into a prominent Montreal business family and after graduating from McGill University, worked for six years as an engineer. In 1910, he founded the brokerage house Greenshields & Company. The firm would go on to become one of the largest brokerages in the country and served as one of the principal underwriters for industrial offerings. Greenshields died on 18 December 1929 at age 47.

== Biography ==
John Gordon Greenshields was born on 8 March 1882 in Montreal to James Naismith Greenshields (1853–1937) and Elizabeth Mary Glass (1849–1919). John had three siblings: Isabel (1880–1954), Charles Glass (1883–1974), and Melville, (1884–1916). James Greenshields was a leading corporate lawyer in Montreal. With his brother, R. A. E. Greenshields, James was a partner in the firm Greenshields, Greenshields, Languedoc & Parkins. James also was the first president of the Shawinigan Water & Power Company, the founder of the Quebec Savings and Trust Company and the Wayagamack Pulp and Paper Company, and president of the Marconi Wireless Company of Canada. Most notably, James served as member of the defense team in the Trial of Louis Riel.

John attended Bishop's College School and graduated in 1900. He went subsequently to McGill University where he studied engineering. Upon graduation in 1904, he worked as an engineer and was involved in some of his father's business endeavours. In 1910, in partnership with Russell Davenport Bell and Richard O. Johnson, he founded the investment brokerage house Greenshields & Company. The firm would go on to become one of Canada's preeminent brokerages. In 1982, Richardson Securities, a subsidiary of James Richardson & Sons of Winnipeg, acquired Greenshields. The new merged firm, Richardson Greenshields of Canada Limited, become the country's largest brokerage by volume of business. In 1996, Richardson Greenshields was acquired by RBC Dominion Securities for $480 million.

Greenshields was a member of the Beaconsfield Golf Club, Saint James's Club, Royal St. Lawrence Yacht Club, Canada Club, St. George's Club, Canadian Mining Institute, Thistle Curling Club, Montreal Racquet Club, Royal Montreal Golf Club, New York Club, Saranac Club, and the Presbyterian Church in Canada. In 1912 he was commissioned into the Royal Highlanders of Canada. John Greenshields never married. He died at his father's home in Danville, Quebec on 18 December 1929 at age 47 and was interred in Mount Royal Cemetery.
