= Murder of Omar Carrasco =

1994 murder in Argentina

- Undated photo of Carrasco
- Location: Zapala, Neuquén Province, Argentina
- Date: c. 6 March 1994
- Attack type: Torture murder, beating
- Victims: Omar Octavio Carrasco, aged 20
- Perpetrator: Military superiors
- Verdict: 15 years in prison (Canevaro); 10 years in prison (Suárez and Salazar); 3 years in prison (Sánchez)
- Convictions: Simple homicide (Canevaro, Suárez and Salazar) (Note: Article 79 of the Penal Code of Argentina defines simple homicide as the act of killing another person with intent but no aggravating circumstances like premeditation, motive, among many other clauses. The code states that those convicted of simple homicide shall be punished with a prison term ranging from 8 to 25 years behind bars.); Concealment (Sánchez)

The murder of Omar Octavio Carrasco (5 January 1974 – March 1994), a 20-year-old conscript in the Argentine Army, occurred in the early days of March 1994. Initially reported as a deserter by military authorities, Carrasco's body was found some 700 metres (2,300 ft) from his assigned barracks in Zapala, Neuquén Province.

After a lengthy investigation proved that Carrasco had been tortured and beaten, strong social backlash resulted in President Carlos Menem's decision to abolish conscription in Argentina.

== Background ==
Omar Octavio Carrasco was born on 5 January 1974 in Cutral Có, a city in the Confluencia Department of Neuquén Province. His parents were Francisco Carrasco and Sebastiana Barrera, a construction worker and a homemaker, respectively. The elder Carrasco also worked in other temporary jobs, like driving trucks and delivering goods in the province. The family were deeply religious and professed Evangelical Christianity; Omar liked reading the Bible and playing guitar. In his adolescence, he began working part-time jobs in Cutral Có, delivering frozen chickens in different neighbourhoods.

His extreme shyness and thin physical appearance made Carrasco a frequent target of bullying, developing only a single friendship during his basic training in the army and showing no defences against insults and harassment. When Carrasco turned 17, he confided in his parents that he was afraid of going into the army to serve his mandatory military service. As a result, he asked for a deferment on the basis that he was finishing his secondary education. In early 1994, Carrasco decided to face the service and presented himself in the region's military district. He was subsequently assigned to Zapala's military base.

== Murder ==
According to conscript Castro, who was the closest to Carrasco in the three days before his disappearance, Carrasco was the subject of bullying, harassment, mocking, and excessive training by his superiors. Castro additionally testified that Carrasco was forced to do push-ups and frog jumps, as well as remain on the ground, often wet and muddy, until the late night. Other forms of torture that Carrasco endured in the days that he was in the artillery unit included doing extratraining while the rest were already showering, running and being forced to do push-ups on gravel or thorny terrains while shirtless, and being exposed to cold temperatures at night, with the naked torso while the superiors looked on and laughed.

During the trial of 1996, witnesses reported also that Carrasco was forced to go to bed after the excessive exercise, sleeping without taking a shower, without his shirt, and muddied and bloodied. He was last seen on 6 March 1994, and he was reported as a deserter in the days that followed. His parents, with his mother, Sebastiana, spearheading the efforts, took the case to national media and forced a federal investigation into the young man's disappearance.

One month later, on 6 April 1994, federal and military agencies found Carrasco's body in the proximities of the base. The body was clothed – later discovered to have been dressed postmortem – and surrounded by military boots and a broken watch. Although local military authorities attempted to ratify their version that Carrasco had gone AWOL and that he had died from exposure, investigators quickly determined that he had been subjected to beatings and other torture that led to his death.

== Reaction and investigation ==
Initially, President Carlos Menem defended the armed forces and stated that half a million young men had gone through the service since 1983. He also accused the media and opponents of a smear campaign against the military. However, as social pressure grew stronger and the investigations showed clear evidence that Carrasco had been murdered, Menem changed his view and met with Carrasco's parents, promising a full inquiry into their son's killing and vowing to pursue justice in the case.

In the days that followed the discovery of Carrasco's body, military authorities arrested second lieutenant Ignacio Canevaro, 23, and two privates named Cristian Suárez and Víctor Salazar, both 19 years old at the time. They were charged with simple homicide and convicted on 31 January 1996. Canevaro was found guilty of being the main responsible person behind the harassment and torture of Carrasco, with a federal court sentencing him to 15 years in prison that same day. Suárez and Salazar received a sentence of 10 years in prison each. A sergeant named Carlos Sánchez was convicted of covering up the crime and given a 3-year prison term.

Argentine society's continued pressure led to President Menem abolishing conscription by signing a decree on 31 August 1994, and military service in Argentina turned to a volunteer programme beginning in 1995.

== Aftermath ==
The soldiers convicted of Carrasco's murder were all set free before 2005. Second Lieutenant Ignacio Canevaro was released on 4 February 2004, after spending nearly 12 years in prison. Privates Suárez and Salazar were set free on 23 November 2000 after being benefited by sentence computing under Argentine law in those years. Since his release from prison, Canevaro has denied his role in the murder, stating that he became a scapegoat for the military commanders of Zapala. He studied law and graduated as a lawyer in 2002 while serving his sentence in a federal prison. In 2009, Canevaro gave an interview on the occasion of the release of his book. Since then, he has never granted another interview and continues denying his crimes. According to Constanza Bengochea, a reporter for La Nación, Canevaro worked as of 2024 in the human resources office of a sanitation business and has a daughter with his wife Cecilia.

Cristian Suárez left Argentina and settled in Spain to avoid public scrutiny, while Víctor Salazar returned to Río Negro Province after his release from prison, leading a largely anonymous life since then.

In August 1999, Carrasco's parents were awarded compensation by a federal judge in Neuquén who determined that they would receive a total of $886,000 Argentine pesos for the moral damage they had gone through and for the legal fees they afforded to pursue their own investigation.

Carrasco's mother, Sebastiana, continued pursuing justice for his son and was actively involved in the case. She died on 26 December 2025 in Cutral Có, at the age of 75. Francisco Carrasco continues to live there as of 2026.

== In media ==
Carrasco's case made a profound impact on Argentina's society, and he is often taken as an example of the brutality that many young men went through during the military service in the country, where it was known as colimba. The case inspired the 1997 film Under Flag of Juan José Jusid, which deals with a similar plot due to Jusid's wish for the film not to be associated only with Carrasco's case but to include the systemic abuse suffered by young men in those years.

In March 2026, a short film titled Seis de Abril (Spanish for 'Sixth of April') debuted in the Cine Teatro Español of Lomas de Zamora. The plot tells the story of Carrasco's case and life and was filmed in Zapala. Carrasco is portrayed by actor Juan Atahualpa Albarracín.

== Convictions ==
Table
Name	Age at the time of the crime	Rank	Charge	Criminal penalty	Released
Ignacio Canevaro	23	Second lieutenant	Simple homicide	15 years in prison	Paroled on 4 February 2004. Sentence later completed
Cristian Suárez	19	Private	Simple homicide	10 years in prison	Paroled on 23 November 2000. Sentence later completed
Víctor Salazar	19	Private	Simple homicide	10 years in prison	Paroled on 23 November 2000. Sentence later completed
Carlos Ricardo Sánchez	N/A	Sergeant	Concealment	3 years in prison	Escaped arrest following the ratification of his sentence in March 1997. He escaped to La Paz, Entre Ríos, and remained at large for months in different locations until he was recaptured and ordered to serve the sentence.
