= Patagonia Rebelde =

1920-1922 workers' uprising in Argentina

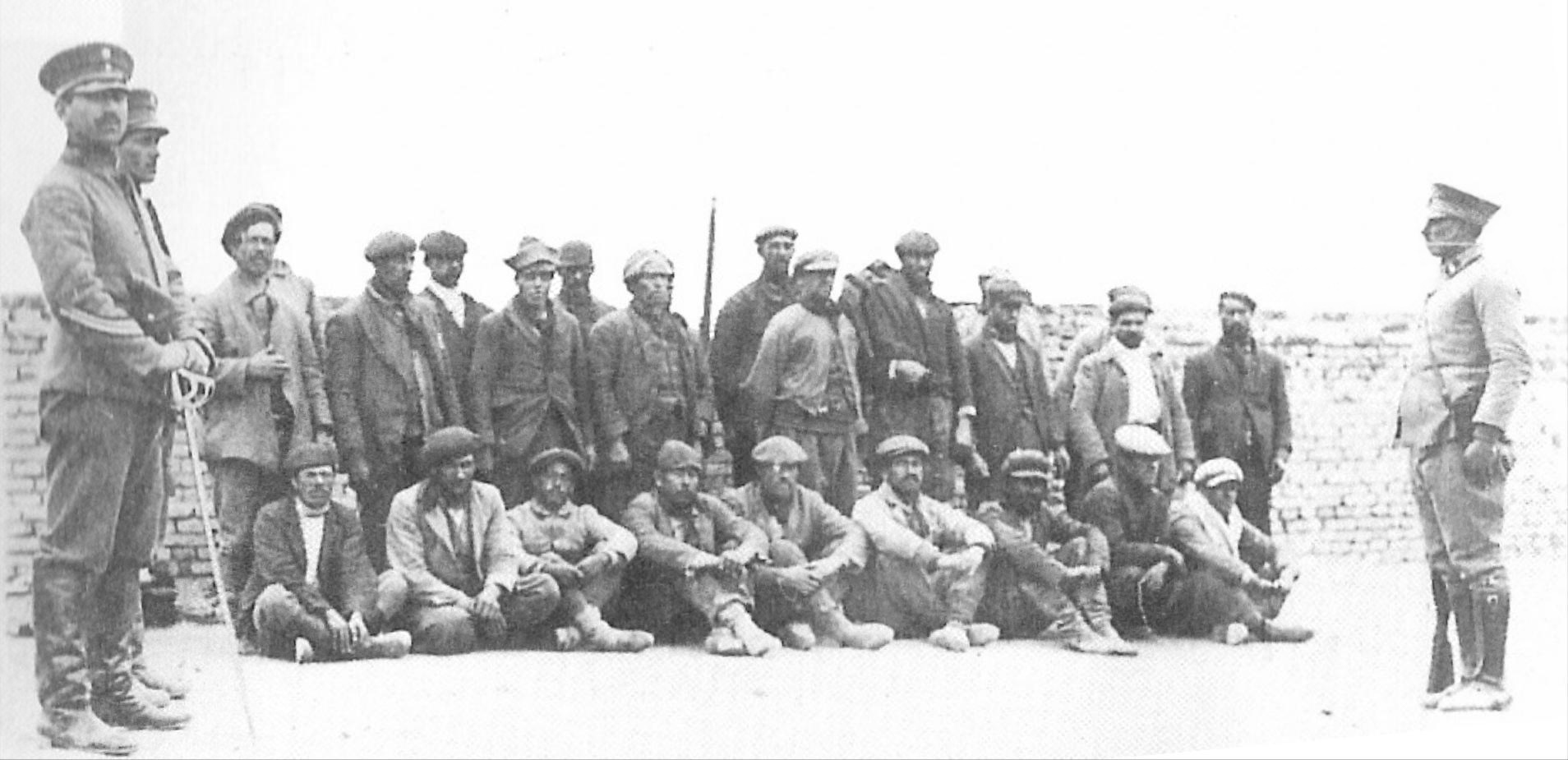
- Arrested workers after the strike's suppression
Date	1920–1922
Location	Santa Cruz Province, Argentina
Result	Strike suppressed by the government

Belligerents
Argentine Regional Workers' Federation	Government of Argentina: Argentine Army; Argentine Federal Police; Argentine Patriotic League; Radical Civic Union

Commanders and leaders
Antonio Soto; Facón Grande (executed)	Hipólito Yrigoyen; Edelmiro Correa Falcón; Héctor Benigno Varela

Casualties and losses
300–1,500	5 policemen 2 soldiers

Patagonia Rebelde (or Patagonia Trágica) ("Rebel Patagonia" or "Tragic Patagonia" in English) was the name given to the uprising and violent suppression of a rural workers' strike in the Argentine province of Santa Cruz in Patagonia between 1920 and 1922. The uprising was put down by Colonel Héctor Benigno Varela's 10th Cavalry Regiment of the Argentine Army under the orders of President Hipólito Yrigoyen. Approximately 300-1,500 rural workers were shot and killed by the 10th Cavalry Regiment in the course of the operations, many of them executed by firing squads after surrendering. Most of the executed were Spanish and Chilean workers who had sought refuge in Argentina's Patagonia after their strike in the city of Puerto Natales in southern Chile in 1919 was crushed by the Chilean authorities, at the cost of four carabiniers killed and the offices of their union were burned down by the civilians, policemen and the militaries in Punta Arenas on 27 July 1920. At least two Argentine soldiers (privates Fernando Pablo Fischer and Domingo Montenegro), three local policemen (sergeant Tomás Rosa and constables Ernesto Bozán and Juan Campos) and a number of ranch owners and their relatives also died during the strife. According to the versions well publicized by the army and the landowners, several of the captured women were raped in the uprising as the rebel forces fought for control of the territory. These versions have been disputed by leftist scholar Ernesto Bohoslavsky. The most detailed narrative of these events is that by Argentine journalist Osvaldo Bayer (1972, below), summarized in English by Bruce Chatwin in 1976.

== Background ==
The Federación Obrera de Magallanes was born in the early 1910 in Punta Arenas, capital of the Chilean Territory of Colonization of Magallanes and economic metropolis of southern Patagonia. The multinational union extended throughout the region and led the formation of the Sociedad Obrera de Río Gallegos (Workers' Society of Rio Gallegos) in the Argentinean National Territory of santa Cruz, directed by the Spanish anarchist Antonio Soto, known as the Gallego Soto. Santa Cruz was a center of wool production for export, with large estates and English meat processing plants. The low demand of wool inventories, which had been accumulated at the end of the First World War, and the fall of the price from $9.74 to $3.08, thus returning to the normal level of quotation in times of peace, gave rise to a regional crisis. This affected landowners and merchants, but had an even greater impact on wool workers and rural laborers, who were living in miserable conditions. With the end of the war, the price of exports of Patagonian raw materials fell. The normal working day of the workers of that time was 12 hours, that of the shearers and muleteers was around 16 hours; wages were minimal and were often paid in bonds or in foreign currency which when exchanged in the stores was taken for a lower value. In addition, the only day off was Sunday. A protest strike in September 1920 against the arbitrary actions of the police, the boycott of three merchants linked to the Sociedad Rural and the arrest of the leaders of the Sociedad Obrera deepened the confrontation. Delegates from all over the province came to discuss the measures to be demanded of the Rural Society. In this situation, the workers gathered in the Sociedad Obrera de Río Gallegos presented the management with a list of demands for an improvement in working conditions. Among other demands, the workers requested that no more than three men should sleep in 16 square meters, that a package of candles should be given to each worker every month, that no work should be done on Saturdays, an improvement in the food portions, a minimum monthly salary of 100 pesos, and recognition of the Sociedad Obrera as the only legitimate representative of the workers, accepting the appointment of a delegate as an intermediary between the parties in conflict. This document was rejected by the organization that grouped the landowners and the Sociedad Obrera. The response of the workers was to declare a general strike throughout Santa Cruz.

== First strike ==
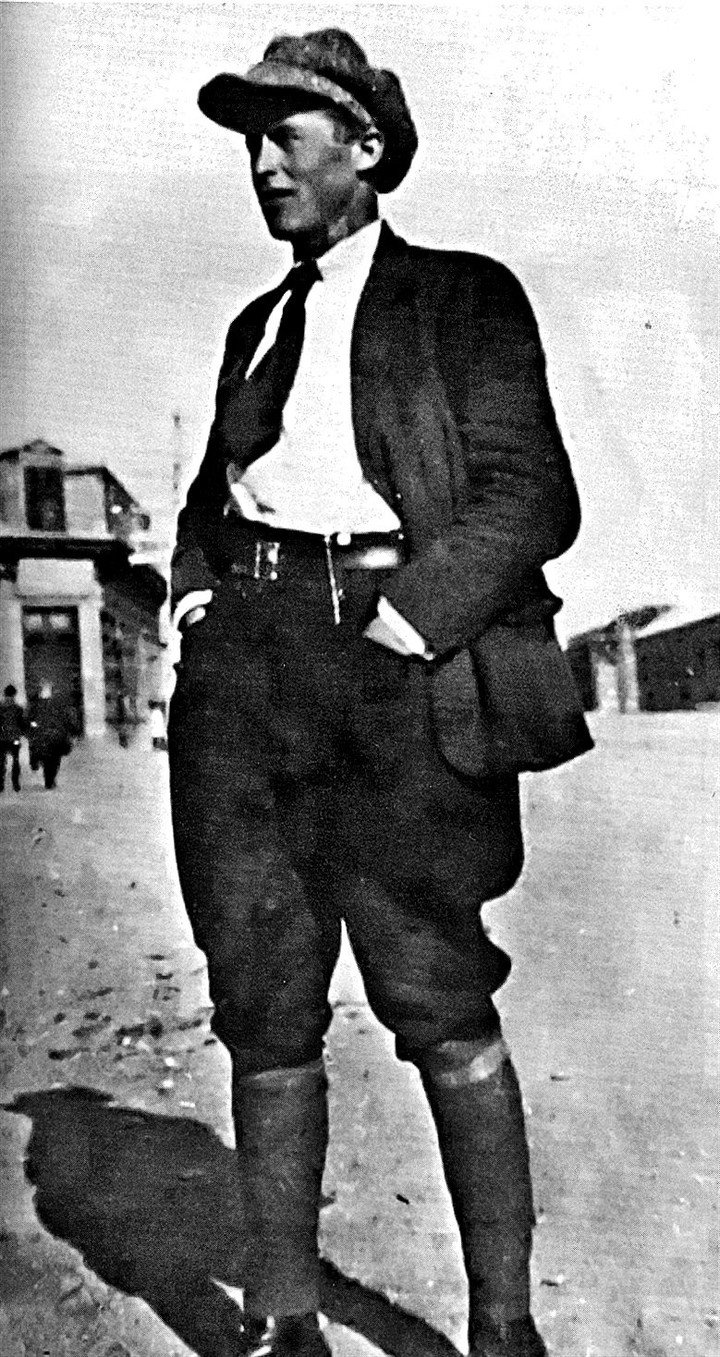
Antonio Soto, the Galician anarchist who led the strike. He was one of the few union leaders to survive the massacre by fleeing to Chile.

In 1920, in the aftermath of the First World War, the price of wool had dropped significantly, provoking an economic crisis in sheep-breeding Argentine Patagonia. The strike occurred during a period in which Argentina had been facing a workers' shortage and an economic downturn, which led to rising prices, which had only began to slowly return to higher economic recovery. The fear of revolution and unrest may have threatened to destroy Argentine society, as the Russian Revolution acted as moral boost for the workers and was fear-inducing in the middle and upper classes of Argentina. During the 8 years preceding the Patagonia Rebelde, the Argentine economy and government was making efforts to move away from a mostly agricultural mode of production and diversify and industrialize, following a trend among nations of the period. The period of economic recovery which preceded the Patagonia Rebelde and followed the economic downturn of 1914 was expected to be less radical and more stable than the period before during the economic downturn. However, it was marked by a number of strikes which resulted in violent confrontations, with Patagonia Rebelde following this trend The Patagonia Rebelde mirrors some aspects of the "Semana Tragica (Tragic Week)", in that it was a failed attempt at using a mass movement in order to affect working conditions with a strike, with its roots in revolutionary and anarchist ideas. The period preceding the Patagonia Rebelde was also marked by the strengthening of the feminist movement within Argentina, which saw changes to the workforce and brought Argentine women in contact with a more radical ideology. In August 1920 there were a number of strikes in the province of Santa Cruz, followed by a general strike declared on 1 November. Most of the strikers were shearers and rural workers. The first armed confrontation took place on 2 January 1921 near El Cerrito, where four policemen and a striker were killed, and two policemen and a gendarme were taken hostages. Another gendarme was shot and killed in an ambush at Centinela river several days later. The ranchers and the interim governor Edelmiro Correa Falcón, himself a landowner, used the incidents to ask the federal government to declare a state of emergency in Santa Cruz. As the unrest spread, the government of Hipólito Yrigoyen ordered Colonel Héctor Benigno Varela's 10th Cavalry Regiment immediately to the affected area and the Argentine Navy seized the various ports and key facilities in the province. The new police chief in Santa Cruz, Oscar Schweizer, under orders of the new governor of the province, radical Ángel Ignacio Yza, instructed Varela to avoid bloodshed and the army colonel was able to work out a deal with the strikers and the ranch owners, and prohibited the payment of wages in Chilean money. In May 1921 the cavalry regiment returned to Buenos Aires but their leave was cancelled in October as strikes broke out again in the province when the ranch owners reneged on their promise of fairer working conditions. The leader of the strikers was a Galician anarchist, Antonio Soto, general secretary of the Workers' Society of Rio Gallegos, the local branch of the Argentine Regional Workers' Federation. Manuel Carlés, president of the Argentine Patriotic League is reported to have violently broken up one of the demonstration of the strikers in Río Gallegos with one dead and four injured in the resulting clash. The month of August saw activity in the ports of Deseado, Santa Cruz, San Julián and Río Gallegos came to a complete standstill with a general strike. Hundreds of strikers believed to be anarchists or Bolsheviks were either thrown in jails or shipped back to Buenos Aires. The Buenos Aires press referred to the armed strikers as "anarchists" and "thieves". At the same time, the Chilean government grew alarmed at the prospect of facing similar unrest in southern Chile and deployed a strong carabineer force under colonel Carlos Ibáñez del Campo to the city of Puerto Natales. According to historian Miguel Angel Scenna, the Argentine government soon grew suspicious of the deployment of this Chilean force on the Chilean-Argentine border. According to captain Elbio Carlos Anaya, a company commander in the 10th Cavalry Regiment, the Chilean carabineers guarding the mountain passes, let the strikers cross back and forth into Argentina armed with weapons and without any hindrance on the part of the authorities. On 16 November 1921, however, the Chilean government eventually took sides and allowed colonel Varela and a motorized column of 13 soldiers to take a 50 km shortcut from Rio Turbio to Cancha Carrera through Chilean territory, east of Puerto Natales, along today's Highway 9.

== Second strike and repression ==
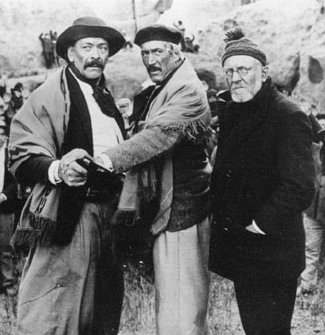
Some strike leaders like "the Gaucho" Cuello, Facón Grande and Schultz, "the German", depicted in the 1974 film Rebellion in Patagonia

Colonel Héctor Benigno Varela's 10th Cavalry Regiment was ordered to return to Santa Cruz Province in November. His company commanders in the second expedition were captains Pedro Viñas Ibarra and Pedro E. Camposare. A detachment of National Gendarmerie troops was also added to the cavalry force. This unit sailed for Santa Cruz on 4 November 1921. In the meantime, as a group of ten strikers approached the Estancia Bremen, the German ranch owner and his parents sensing danger, sought to defend their property with carbines and two strikers were killed and four were wounded in the exchange of fire. In response the strikers took several ranch owners and their families hostage and reportedly killed and raped some. Upon disembarking at Santa Cruz port the 10th Cavalry Regiment soon made its presence felt with arbitrary arrests and executions. After a clash in Punta Alta the 10th Cavalry Regiment liberated 14 hostages. But the soldiers were also reported to have killed some 100 unarmed workers suspected of collaborating with the strikers, among them Santiago González, a stonemason at the local Argentina National Bank (Banco de la Nación Argentina) branch. González, an anarchist, was forced to dig his own grave before being shot. Albino Argüelles, secretary general of the Sociedad Obrera of San Julián, a blacksmith and a member of the Socialist Party, was also captured and shot in November 1921. In December one of the ranch owners, Daniel Ramírez, was himself taken into detention under the orders of captain Anaya for assisting and actively cooperating with the armed strikers. Ramírez was executed in the first week of February 1922 after having been brutally tortured for over a week. His wife and several local merchants intervened and pleaded for his life, but this was to no avail. At Paso Ibáñez a large column of some 900 demoralized armed strikers tried to negotiate a favorable surrender with Colonel Varela but were soon rebuffed and retreated to regroup at Río Chico and Estancia Bella Vista after freeing those they had taken captive as hostages. In the meantime the local police forces hunted down and arrested or executed those sympathetic to the armed uprising. The cavalry regiment captured some 480 strikers in the interior at Cañadón León along with 4,000 horses and 298 rifles and carbines and 49 revolvers. More than half of those captured at Cañadón León were executed before the firing squads stopped. The regiment then stormed La Anita and Menéndez Behety estancias and some 80 ranch owners and their families as well as captured policemen and other civilians were released in the operation, with around 500 captured strikers being executed. The armed strikers, knowing there would be no mercy, made a desperate last stand at Tehuelches train station but were defeated after a one-hour long battle and the survivors marched off to firing squads. At Estación Tehuelches (today's Pico Truncado) the army lost the only soldier killed in action during the campaign, Private Fernando Pablo Fischer. The other soldier to die in the operations was a corporal, 19-year-old Domingo Montenegro, shot and killed in error in the darkness by Clase 900 (1900 draft class) Private Eusebio Peralta while Montenegro returned to his vivac from sentry duties, according to historian Osvaldo Bayer who referred to the conscripts disparagingly as "poor rifle slavemen".

The 10th Cavalry Regiment having accomplished its mission of putting the uprising soon received orders to return to Buenos Aires, but some 200 soldiers were left behind under the commands of captains Anaya and Viñas Ibarra. Contrary to Argentine popular myth, Varela received a frosty reception in Buenos Aires where the Minister of War gave him a complete dressing down. Varela also came under heavy criticism by the Socialist parliamentarian Antonio Di Tomaso.

== Aftermath ==
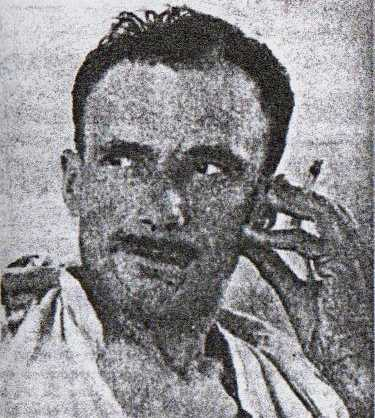
Kurt Gustav Wilckens

News of the mass execution soon reached Buenos Aires but the government made no call into an official investigation for fear of political repercussions. Argentine socialists and anarchists however promised vengeance. Kurt Gustav Wilckens, a 35-year-old German immigrant from Silesia, had been deported from the United States for his radical political views. In Argentina, he worked as a stevedore at Ingeniero White and Bahía Blanca, as a farm worker in Alto Valle del Río Negro and as a correspondent for the anarchist newspapers Alarm of Hamburg and The Syndicalist of Berlin. Although he claimed to be an adherent of Tolstoy's pacifism, Wilckens killed Varela in a gun and bomb attack outside the officer's recently acquired home at Humboldt-Santa Fe in January 1923 because of his desire "to wound through him the brazen idol of a criminal system". Upon hearing of the assassination, Argentine President Yrigoyen arranged that the house the colonel had been paying off be given to the widow of Varela as a gift, even though the couple had only recently committed to purchasing. Wilckens himself was killed in Villa Devoto prison while awaiting sentencing, by José Pérez Millán Temperley, a young man from an aristocratic family belonging to the Patriotic League. Pérez Millán had served in Patagonia. He was the gendarme taken hostage by the strikers after the gunbattle at El Cerrito, in 1921, and was also a distant relative of Varela. News of Wilckens's death led to a general dock strike and the burning of streetcars, as well as arrests, injuries and deaths but achieved according to historian Otto Vargas "an incredible miracle in unifying the divided working class in Argentina". Pérez Millán was found guilty of manslaughter and condemned to eight years in prison. He was however declared insane 14 months later and admitted to Las Mercedes mental hospital in Buenos Aires, where he was eventually shot and killed by another inmate instigated by Russian anarchist Boris Wladimirovich.

In June 1921, Argentine parliamentarians debated a proposed law giving the state the power to control unions, declare strikes illegal, and reimpose the ten-hour workday. This debate provoked popular condemnation in a demonstration supported on all sides, followed by a general strike and a declaration of state of emergency along the country.

The repression of the 1920-1922 strikes culminated both the Patagonian labor movement and the initial colonization of southern Patagonia and Tierra del Fuego, and inaugurated the effective erection of border patrols by the Argentinean and the Chilean militaries.

== Filmography ==
The 1974 film La Patagonia rebelde directed by Héctor Olivera and scripted by Osvaldo Bayer recreates that massacre. It was first censored by then President Juan Domingo Perón, who retracted from his decision on 12 June of that year. After Perón's death it was censored, once again, on 12 October by the government of Isabel Perón. The movie could only be shown again with the return of formal democracy in 1984. The film won the award "Oso de Plata" at the Berlinale in 1974.

In 1996 the film Flores amarillas en la ventana (Yellow flowers on the window) directed by Victor Jorge Ruiz, was released. It recreates some of the events of 1921 that have left a trace in the landscape and the collective memory of the Patagonian population, with some semi-destroyed monuments and commemorative murals.

In 2006, the documentary La vuelta de Osvaldo Bayer (The Return of Osvaldo Bayer), directed by Eduardo Anguita was released. In this documentary, Anguita recreates -in tandem with Bayer's guidance the landscapes and the trace left in the collective memory of the Patagonian population.

== Literature ==
In the story De cómo murió el chilote Otey (How the chilote Otey died), Chilean writer Francisco Coloane revives an episode set in the final days of the strike. While some 850 workers under the command of Facón Grande flee toward the Paine mountain and the border with Chile, another 40, among them the chilotes Otey and Rivera, decide to die for their comrades and remain barricaded in a storehouse to make Varela's men lose time in combat. During the narrative, the characters present versions of the causes and events of the strike and also reflect on the discrimination suffered by the chilotes in Patagonia. David Viñas' book, Los dueños de la tierra (The owners of the land), also narrates the story of the events in Patagonia Rebelde (Rebellious Patagonia or Tragic Patagonia), through the story of the mediator sent by the radical government to solve the conflict in a peaceful manner before the military intervention. Pavel Oyarzún, a novelist and poet born in Punta Arenas, Chile, wrote in 2004 the novel El Paso del Diablo (The Devil's Passage), in which he describes the escape of the workers who went on strike and who were chased by the soldiers of the 10th Cavalry Regiment.

== See also ==
- Ranquil massacre
- La Forestal massacre
- Tragic Week (Argentina)
- La Patagonia rebelde (film)
- Federación Obrera Regional Argentina
- List of massacres in Argentina
- List of cases of police brutality in Argentina
- Osvaldo Bayer
- Esther Porter

== Sources ==
=== Bibliografía ===
- Bohoslavsky, Ernesto (2005). Interpretaciones derechistas de la «Patagonia Trágica» en Argentina, 1920-1974, Historia Política, UBA-UNICEN-UNLP-UNMdP-UNS-UNSAM (in Spanish)
- Borrero, J. M. La Patagonia trágica. José María Borrero. (1928) (in Spanish)
- Bayer, Osvaldo. La Patagonia rebelde (tomo I: Los bandoleros). Osvaldo Bayer, Editorial Galerna, Buenos Aires, (1972) (in Spanish)
- La Patagonia rebelde (tomo II: La masacre). Osvaldo Bayer, Editorial Galerna, Buenos Aires, (1972) (in Spanish)
- La Patagonia rebelde (tomo III: Humillados y ofendidos). Osvaldo Bayer, Editorial Galerna, Buenos Aires, (1974) (in Spanish)
- La Patagonia rebelde (tomo IV: El vindicador). Osvaldo Bayer, Editorial Booket, Buenos Aires, (1997) (in Spanish)
- Harambour, Alberto (2019). Soberanías Fronterizas. Estados y capital en la colonización de Patagonia (Argentina y Chile, 1830-1922). Valdivia: Ediciones de la Universidad Austral de Chile. 978-956-390-091-0
