= Cengiz Doğu =

Turkish-German poet and activist (1945–2019)

- Born: 1 August 1945 (age 80); İzmir, Turkey
- Died: 14 November 2019 (aged 74)
- Citizenship: Turkey, Germany
- Occupations: Activist; Poet
- Years active: 1966–2019

Cengiz Doğu (1 August 1945 – 14 November 2019) was a Turkish poet and activist against racism and discrimination who fled from political persecution in Turkey to Germany.

== Life ==
Cengiz Doğu went to school in İzmir and studied Turkish language and literature from 1965 till 1974 in Istanbul. He was politically active since 1966, as he approached the Workers' Party of Turkey ideologically and co-founded the "Student Association of Turkish Studies" in 1968.

After the 1971 Turkish military memorandum, all student associations were banned, and Cengiz Doğu was jailed for 20 days. He completed his military service from 1975 to 1977, but his studies were cancelled in 1977. He worked as a newspaper proofreader and emigrated to Germany in 1978, but returned to Turkey after a few months. However, after the 1980 Turkish coup d'état, Doğu had to fear for his life and fled to Germany for good.

From 1981 to 1988 he lived in the asylum seeker camp in Neuburg an der Donau where he wrote the book of poems Das Lager gleicht nicht den Kerkern Anatolien. Since his asylum application was rejected, he was expecting deportation to Turkey for years, although many German notable people and organizations supported his right to stay. In 1989 he married Lili Schlumberger, then spokesperson of the Bavarian Refugee Council, and moved to Dachau. In 1991, he was recognized as an asylum seeker and received German citizenship in 1997.

Cengiz Doğu was active in Germany with readings, civic actions for refugee and human rights, speaking engagements against racism and discrimination, while earning his living as a storage worker. Together with Osvaldo Bayer and Urs M. Fiechtner he developed the documentary short film Asylum (1984). The film was shown at the International Festival of the Film Schools in Munich (Internationales Festival der Filmhochschulen München) and won a prize of the German Film Critics at the International Short Film Festival in Oberhausen (Internationale Kurzfilmtagen Oberhausen).

In 1989 Doğu became a member of the "Verband deutscher Schriftsstellerinnen und Schriftsteller" and later was engaged in the Munich group of the "Werkkreis Literatur der Arbeitswelt", a writers' group in Germany that not only involved professional but also freelance writers. Doğu also participated in the events at the memorial site of the Dachau concentration camp.

Cengiz Doğu died in Dachau after a long illness on 14 November 2019 and now rests at the Waldfriedhof.

== Poetry ==
Doğu's lyrical poems, prose contributions and book publications in German and Turkish come from his experiences of imprisonment, flight, camp, racial discrimination and exile. People flee "when the human hunters begin their chase [ ... ], when the voice of torture takes the place of laughter [ ... ]," Dogu wrote in a poem. His poem Why did you flee your country? has been reprinted several times.

In 1988 Doğu published bilingual collection of poems Das Lager gleicht nicht den Kerkern Anatolien. In seven years in the collection camp in Neuburg an der Donau, he had created poems in which he sings the sad song of asylum, the longing for home and freedom for his country, but also powerful verses of love, life and death. He opposes the long nights in the camp to "the small, wretched cells of the Anatolian dungeons in which humanity bleeds." A forest near the Danube, that he got to know "for three and a half years," is also reflected in his further book of poems Neuburg Lieder. Just like the forest, Doğu feels confined to a location and "can not change his place."

== Bibliography ==
=== Books ===
- Das Lager gleicht nicht den Kerkern Anatoliens. Benzemiyor Anadolu hapishanelerine Neuburg'un mülteci kampı. Gedichte zweisprachig, Deutsch und Türkisch, Übersetzung Herbert Kugler, Verlag Schanzer Journal, Ingolstadt 1988. Zweite korrigierte und erw. Aufl. übers. v. Cengiz Dogu, Herbert Kugler und Lili Schlumberger-Dogu, Frieling, Berlin 2008, ISBN 978-3-8280-2602-5
- Neuburg-Lieder, Edition Pergamon, Selbstverlag, Dachau 1998
- Der Mensch, Books on Demand, Norderstedt 2009, ISBN 978-3-8370-3525-4
- Flüchtlinge: Die Straßenkinder der Menschheit. Books on Demand, Norderstedt 2009, ISBN 978-3-8370-8117-6

=== Contributions ===
- Bericht aus Mamak. In: Anja Tuckermann (Hrsg.): In die Flucht geschlagen : Geschichten aus dem bundesdeutschen Asyl (= Sammlung Luchterhand. Nr. 0852). Luchterhand Literaturverlag, Frankfurt 1989, ISBN 978-3-630-61852-4, pp. 144–150.
- Warum sind Sie aus Ihrem Land geflüchtet. In: Anja Tuckermann (Hrsg.): In die Flucht geschlagen : Geschichten aus dem bundesdeutschen Asyl (= Sammlung Luchterhand. Nr. 0852). Band 0852. Luchterhand Literaturverlag, Frankfurt 1989, ISBN 978-3-630-61852-4, pp. 151–157.

=== Screenplay ===
- Asylum, Dokumentarfilm; Kurzfilm 1984; Regie: Friedrich Klütsch
