= Federación Obrera de Magallanes =

20th-century Argentine trade federation based in Patagonia

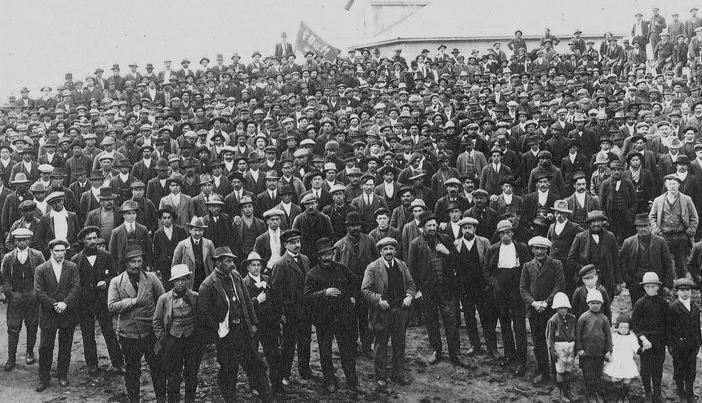
FOM rally in Punta Arenas, c. 1918

Federación Obrera de Magallanes ('Workers Federation of Magallanes', abbreviated FOM) was a trade union movement based in Punta Arenas, Chile, active between 1911 and the mid-1920s. FOM was targeted in a deadly arson attack in 1920.

== Establishment ==
FOM was founded on June 11, 1911, after a number of organizational attempts by socialists, anarchists and mutualist workers, of multinational origin It was linked to the Federación Obrera de Chile (FOCH). Politically, FOM moved over time combining socialist and anarchist positions. Within FOM, there were influences from the small Socialist Workers Party. Luis Emilio Recabarren visited Punta Arenas between May and August 1916 and during his stay he gave many lectures for FOM. However, over time, anarchist ideas also took root in FOM. In May 1913 a number of articles with syndicalist orientation were published in the FOM press, indicating the existence of a libertarian wing inside the movement. There was a rival and more radical trade union movement in Punta Arenas called Centro de Resistencia de Oficios Varios (CROV).

== Organization ==
FOM organized workers in meatpacking plants, ports, other urban trades, and amongst ranch workers. FOM had its own printing press and issued two newspapers.

As of 1920, FOM had around 4,000 members, roughly half of the adult population of Punta Arenas. Having been able to build up a strong strike fund, FOM could pressure companies to accept collective bargaining agreements and cash wage-payments for workers. The movement sought to restrict alcohol sales.

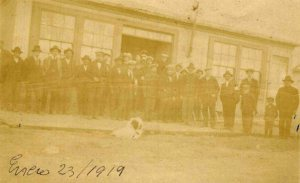
Puerto Natales commune, January 1919

At the end of 1918 and in early 1919, FOM workers took control of Puerto Natales during a general strike. The uprising was eventually crushed by Carabineros.

=== Arson attack ===
In the midst of the patriotic fervour of the 'Don Ladislao War' in July 1920, conservative sectors sought to counter the influence of FOM. FOM was accused of being run by foreigners.

The office of FOM and El Trabajo was attacked on the morning of July 27, 1920. At around 3 a.m., military and police surrounded the building. They opened fire on the building, whose thin walls did little to stop the bullets. The FOM workers who tried to exit the building were killed on its doorsteps. The attackers then set the house afire, burning the remaining persons inside to death. Fire fighters were prevented by military and police to reach the site of the fire. More than 30 workers died in the attack.

On the same night, the editor of El Socialista was attacked in his home. Following the attack, a number of FOM leaders were arrested. No local newspapers were published for three days, and when they resumed publication, they had been instructed not to mention the deadly arson attack. The attacks were followed by a pampant nationalistic-pro hispanic official celebration by Spanish monarchism and Chilean oligarchies.

== Later history ==
Ahead of the 1921 convention in Rancagua, FOM (now under anarchist influence) had positioned itself in the camp opposing affiliation to Profintern, and declined to send delegates to Rancagua.

FOM continued to exist until the mid-1920s. In 1927 Sindicato Profesional de la Industria Ganadera y Frigorífica was founded in Punta Arenas as a continuation of FOM.
