= David Viñas =

Argentine dramatist, critic, and novelist (1927–2011)

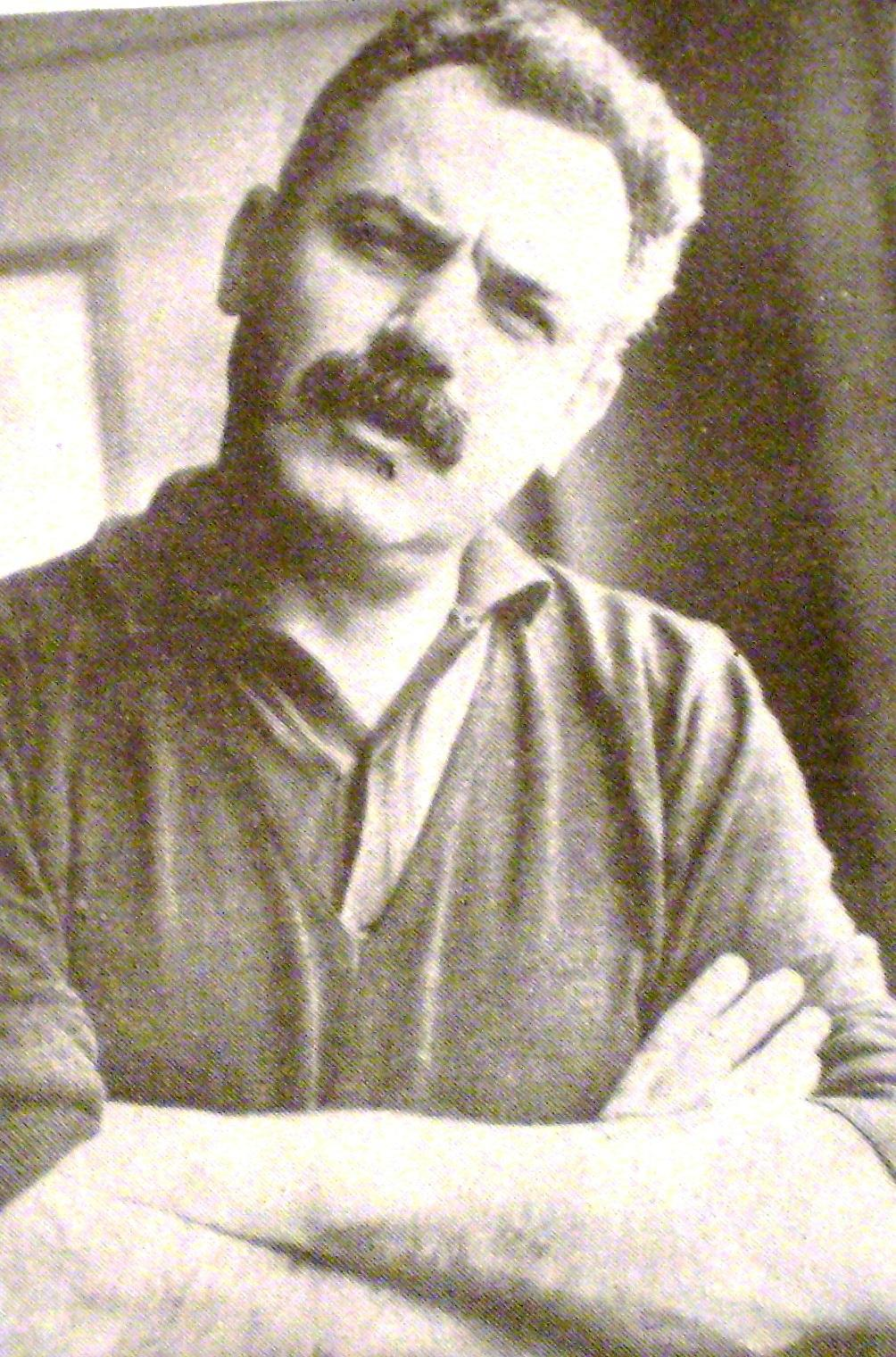
- Born: 28 July 1927; Buenos Aires, Argentina
- Died: 10 March 2011 (aged 83); Buenos Aires, Argentina
- Occupation(s): Dramatist; Critic; Novelist; Screenwriter
- Years active: 1955–2008
- Parents: Ismael Pedro Viñas (father); Esther Porter (mother)
- Relatives: Ismael Viñas (brother)

David Viñas (28 July 1927 – 10 March 2011) was an Argentine dramatist, critic, and novelist.

== Life and career ==
Viñas was born and raised in Buenos Aires, and enrolled in the University of Buenos Aires, becoming head of the Argentine University Federation student organization. He published his first novel in 1955, and first came to wide attention when he won the Gerchunoff Prize for his novel Un Dios Cotidiano (1957). He received the National Prize for Jauria (1971). The following year, his play Lisandro won the National Prize for Theater.

Viñas' work centers on Argentine history, and generally does not partake of the magical realism favored by many of his contemporaries. He is deeply concerned with Argentina's legacy of authoritarianism and the problems posed by the nature and historical dominance of the Argentine military. Two of his children disappeared during the 1976-83 military regime, and he spent that era in exile, returning to Argentina in 1984.

He was an early mentor of critic and essayist Beatriz Sarlo, although he adhered to a more traditional leftist position than did Sarlo in later years. Following the election of left-wing Peronist Néstor Kirchner in 2003, he became a vocal supporter of his, and in 2008 co-founded Carta Abierta ("Open Letter") with journalist Horacio Verbitsky, an informal think tank of left-wing public figures in literature, journalism and academia who regularly publish opinion columns in defense of Kirchnerism.

Viñas directed the Institute of Argentine Literature at his Alma Mater.
