= Frank Greenshields =

English cricketer

Personal information
- Full name: Trevor Francis Greenshields
- Born: 27 October 1941 (age 85); Newcastle upon Tyne, Northumberland, England
- Batting: Left-handed

Domestic team information
- Years: Team
- 1969–1978: Durham

Career statistics
Competition	List A
Matches	4
Runs scored	42
Batting average	10.50
100s/50s	–/–
Top score	20
Balls bowled	–
Wickets	–
Bowling average	–
5 wickets in innings	–
10 wickets in match	–
Best bowling	–
Catches/stumpings	–/–
- Source: Cricinfo, 7 August 2011

Trevor Francis Greenshields (born 27 October 1941) is a former English cricketer. Greenshields was a left-handed batsman. He was born in Newcastle upon Tyne, Northumberland.

Greenshields made his debut for Durham against Staffordshire in the 1969 Minor Counties Championship. He played Minor counties cricket for Durham from 1969 to 1978, making 34 Minor Counties Championship appearances. He made his List A debut against Hertfordshire in the Gillette Cup. He 3 further List A appearances, the last of which came against Yorkshire in the 1978 Gillette Cup. In his 4 List A matches, he scored 42 runs at an average of 10.50, with a high score of 20.
