= Antonio Soto (syndicalist) =

Argentine anarcho-syndicalist (1897–1963)

Antonio Soto Canalejo
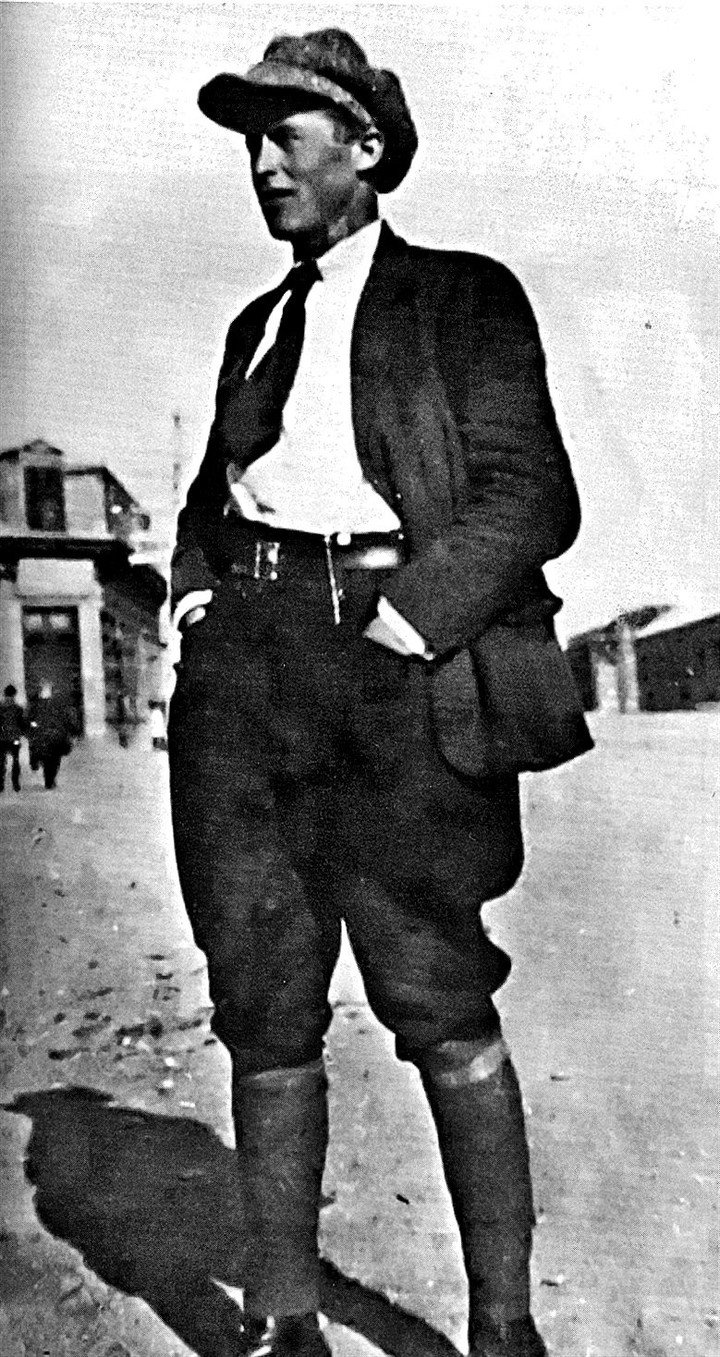
- Born: 8 October 1897; Ferrol, A Coruña, Kingdom of Spain
- Died: 11 May 1963 (aged 65); Punta Arenas, Magallanes Province, Chile
- Resting place: Cemetery of Punta Arenas; 53°09′10″S 70°53′51″W
- Other name: El Gallego
- Citizenship: Argentine and Spanish
- Known for: Patagonia Rebelde (Rebel Patagonia)
- Movement: Anarchism; Anarcho-syndicalism; Socialism
- Children: Isabel Soto

Antonio Soto Canalejo (1897–1963), also known as "El Gallego Soto", was one of the principal anarcho-syndicalist leaders in the rural strikes in Patagonia of Argentina in 1921.

== Biography ==
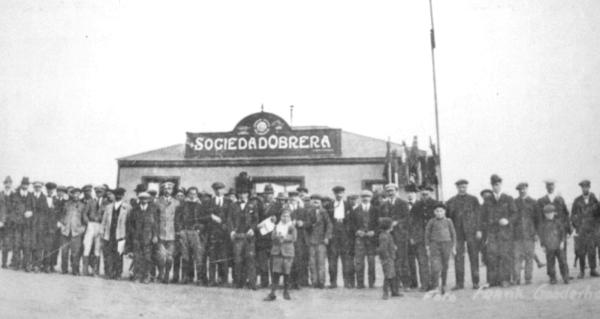
Workers Society of Río Gallegos

The rural labor movement during the second 1921 Patagonia strike was divided into two parts: the column of Antonio Soto and the column of José Font (better known as Facón Grande). Until the beginning of December, Soto had dominated all the area south of Argentino Lake and of the Viedma Lake, and his contingent was the biggest (with around 600 workers). They operated from the estancia La Anita.

On 7 December, the army was nearby and the workers met in an assembly. Juan Farina, a Chilean worker, proposed that they surrender to the army and a majority of the peasants supported the decision. Soto argued that it was necessary to continue the strike, but ultimately agrees to send two men to parley with the army and to discuss surrender, guarantees, and the fulfilment of the terms of the agreement made by Varela the year before. Upon arrival at the military encampment, the two men were immediately executed.

When the army arrived at estancia La Anita and demanded the unconditional surrender of all of the striking workers. The leaders of the strike met in an assembly, where Soto gave a dramatic speech but was ultimately ignored by a majority of the assembly, who eventually decided to surrender and end the strike. Upon their surrender, Varela's troops executed a large number of the workers. Soto and twelve men escaped on horseback to Chile and was never captured by the authorities.

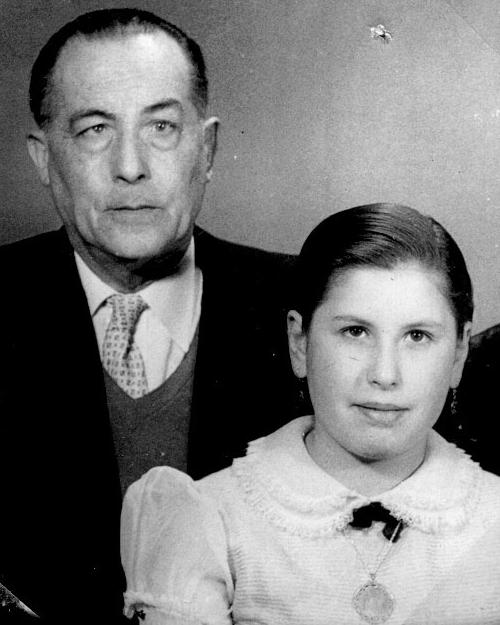
Soto with his daughter Isabel

In 1933 he traveled incognito to Río Gallegos to explain his involvement in the 1921 strike, where he made contact with his comrades and prepared an act that was, compared to the previous strike, a disaster. Soto was immediately expelled from the province by the governor Gregores. In exile, he became less militant but never broke with anarchism.

Soto settled in Punta Arenas and managed a small hotel, which served as a meeting place of libertarians, intellectuals, and free-thinkers. He also founded the Centro Republicano Español, the Centro Gallego, a branch of the Red Cross, and a cinema named Libertad.
