= Karen Greenshields =

Karen Greenshields is a reporter for STV News in Central Scotland.

Before joining STV as a researcher in 1995, Greenshields lived overseas for many years, including 12 months in Brazil, and had various stints as a researcher with independent production companies. Her degree in languages led to various jobs as an interpreter and translator.

Greenshields first worked for regional travel show Scottish Passport before becoming a weather presenter. She later joined the Scotland Today newsroom and specialises in arts and features, including the Edinburgh Fringe festival.
