= Greenshields Peak =

Mountain in Antarctica

Greenshields Peak (65°40′S 64°22′W) is a peak between Leroux Bay and Bigo Bay, rising 1 nautical mile (2 km) west of the Magnier Peaks on the west coast of Graham Land, Antarctica. It was mapped by the Falkland Islands Dependencies Survey from photos taken by Hunting Aerosurveys Ltd in 1956–57, and was named by the UK Antarctic Place-Names Committee for James N.H. Greenshields, a pilot with the Falkland Islands and Dependencies Aerial Survey Expedition in this area, 1955–56.
