= R. A. E. Greenshields =

Canadian lawyer, judge and academic (1861–1942)

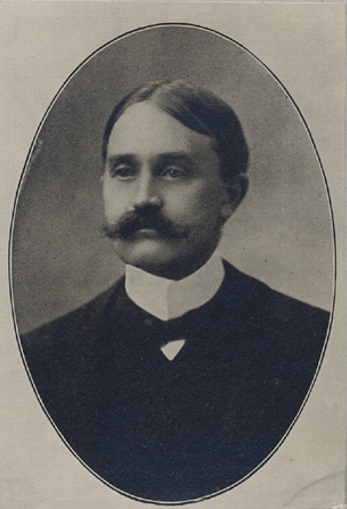
- Born: Robert Alfred Ernest Greenshields; February 2, 1861; Danville, Canada East, Canada
- Died: September 28, 1942 (aged 81)
- Spouse: Maude Gooderham (m. 1890)

Robert Alfred Ernest Greenshields KC (February 2, 1861 – September 28, 1942) was Chief Justice of the Superior Court of the Province of Quebec; Dean of the Faculty of Law at McGill University and 9th Chancellor of Bishop's University.

Greenshields was born at Danville, Canada East, the youngest son of Scottish-born parents John Greenshields (1823–1901), farmer and mill owner of Danville, and Margaret Naismith.

Educated at Danville Academy, he graduated from in Arts from McGill University, 1883, and in civil law in 1885. Greenshields established a legal practice in Montreal with his elder brother, James Naismith Greenshields (1853–1937) who had served as a member of the legal defence team in the trial of Louis Riel. He was appointed Queen's Counsel in 1899. In 1910, he was appointed Judge of the Superior Court of the Province of Quebec, becoming Chief Justice in 1929. At McGill, Greenshields became Associate Professor of Criminal Law in 1915, and full Professor in 1920. From 1923 until 1927 he served as Dean of the Faculty of Law, and retired in 1929 as emeritus professor. In 1932, he succeeded Frederick Edmund Meredith as Chancellor of Bishop's University, a position he held until his death in 1942.

In 1890, he married Maude Adelaide Gooderham (1868–1952), daughter of Robert Turner Gooderham (1841–1913), of Toronto. They lived in Montreal's Golden Square Mile at 3465 Simpson Street and kept a summer property at St. Andrews, New Brunswick. They were the parents of one daughter. After Greenshields' death, his wife endowed the Chief Justice R.A.E. Greenshields Memorial Scholarship for law students at McGill University.
