= Héctor Benigno Varela =

Argentinian military officer

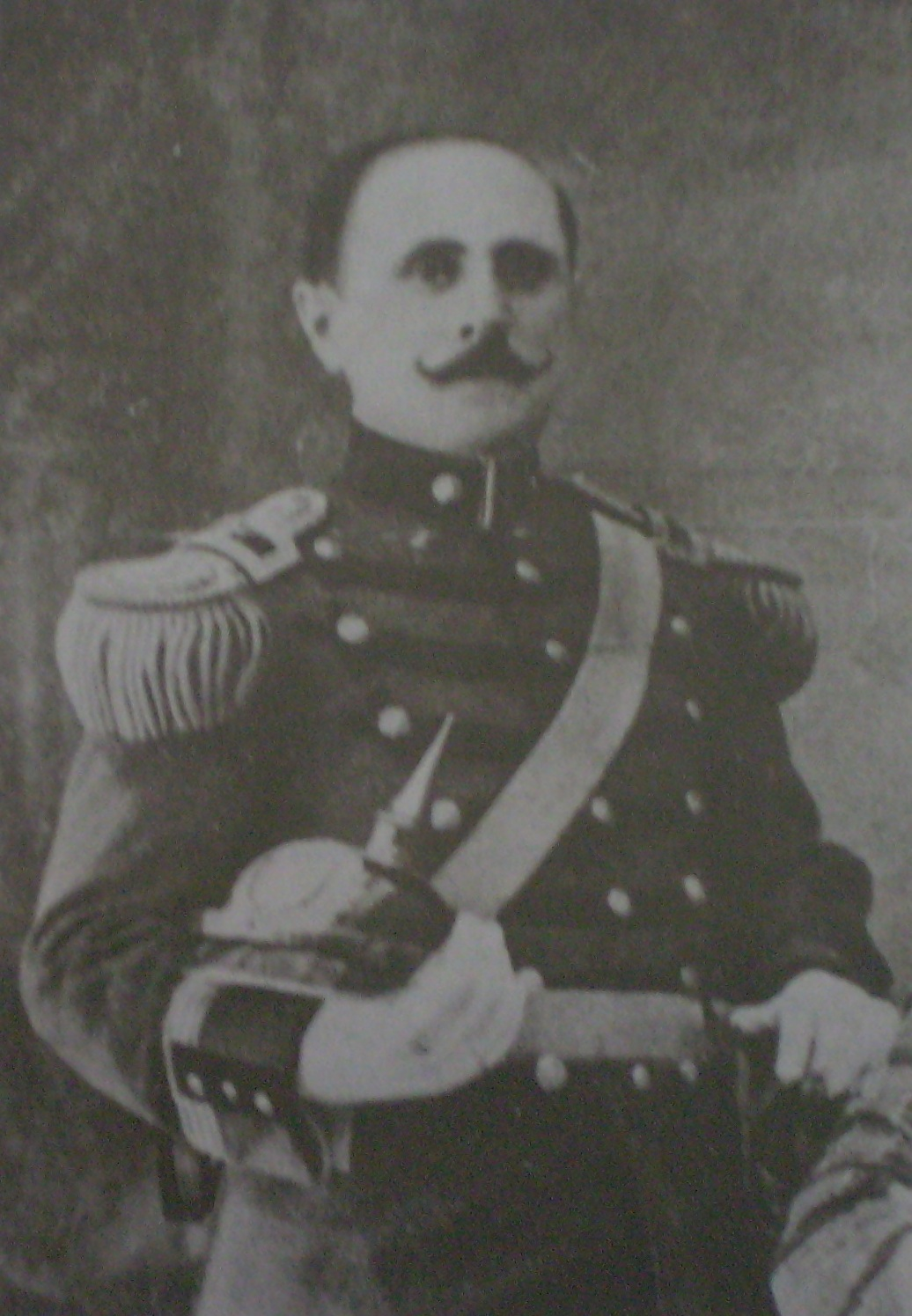
- Born: January 27, 1875; Renca, San Luis, Argentina
- Died: January 27, 1923 (aged 48); Buenos Aires, Argentina
- Cause of death: Assassination by gunshot
- Occupation: Military officer
- Known for: Massacres against strikers of Patagonia Rebelde
- Opponent: Argentine Regional Workers' Federation

Héctor Benigno Varela (January 27, 1875 – January 27, 1923) was an Argentine military officer, best known for having been responsible for the massacre of between 300 and 1,500 workers in the Santa Cruz province, during the events that became known as Patagonia Rebelde.

== Early life ==
Varela was born on January 27, 1875, in Renca, San Luis, son of Ramón S. Varela and Ramona Domínguez. He joined the San Martín Military College on February 19, 1895; then in December 1896 he started his military career in the 7th Cavalry Regiment. He then went on to the 3rd Regiment, where he was promoted to lieutenant in 1904.

In 1919, Varela participated in the repression of workers' strikes during the Tragic Week, under the command of Luis Dellepiane.

== Patagonia rebelde ==
In November 1920, a rural workers' strike broke out in Santa Cruz, which went down in history as Patagonia Rebelde or Patagonia Tragica (Rebel Patagonia or Tragic Patagonia). Varela was appointed by Hipólito Yrigoyen to try to smooth things out between the parties. After meeting with the strikers, an agreement was reached. However, when Varela withdrew from Patagonia, the ranchers did not comply and the strike began again as if there had been no agreement. However, the government, being strongly criticized and accused of inaction by Santa Cruz landowners, conservative newspapers and embassies of foreign powers, sent Varela back to Santa Cruz with a force of 200 soldiers to violently repress the workers' movement. For more than a month Varela's troops pursued the strikers, executing by firing squad most of them.

The event that best illustrates the criminal methods used by Varela was the torture and execution of José Font, alias "Facón Grande", on December 23 by order of Varela himself, after he had assured him that he would respect his life if he surrendered peacefully.

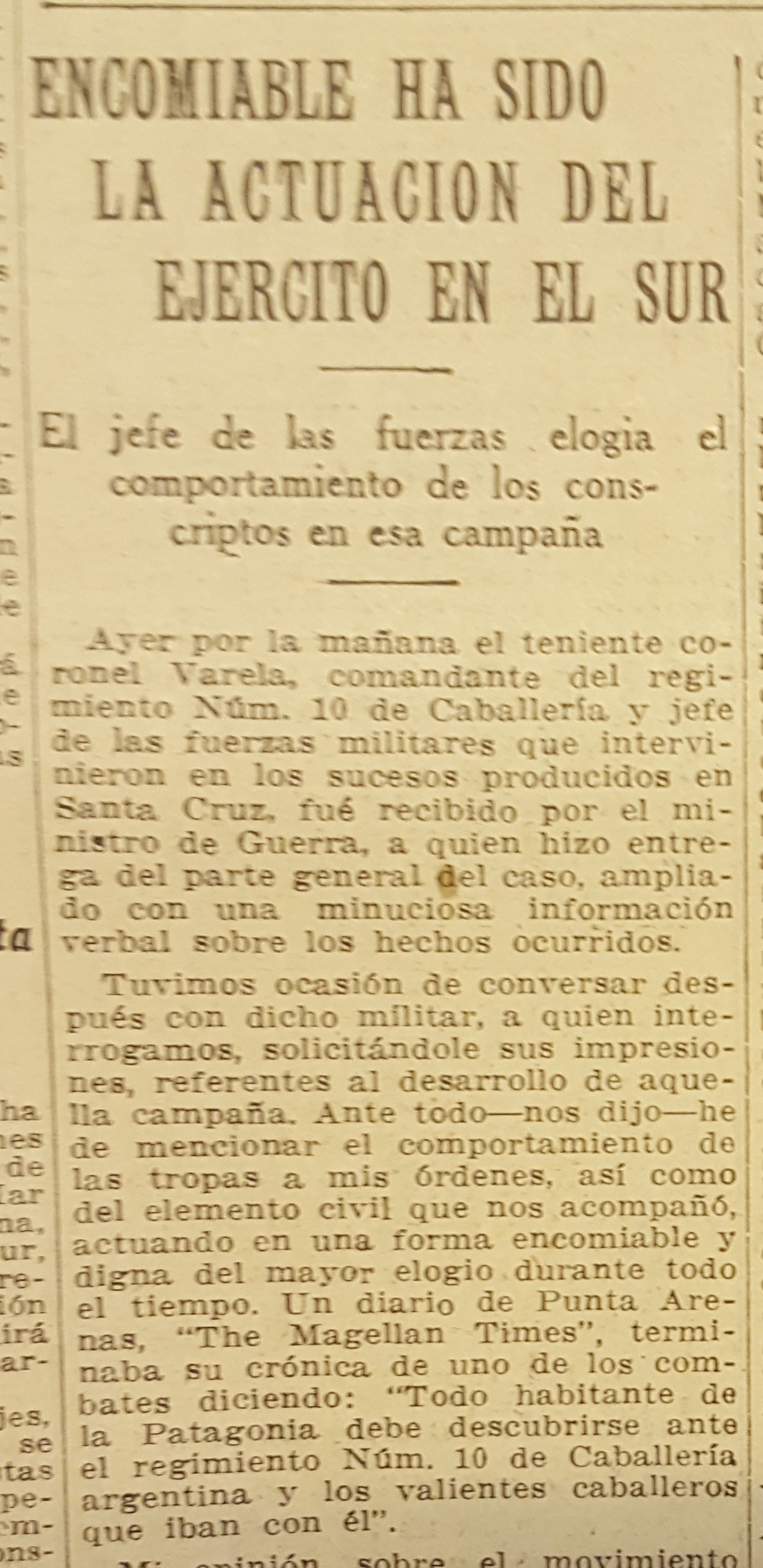
Statements by Varela in the newspaper La Nación on January 26, 1921.

For these events he was honored by the nationalist paramilitary group Argentine Patriotic League.

== Death ==
One year after the end of the massacre in Santa Cruz, on the morning of January 27, 1923, Héctor Benigno Varela was assassinated as he was leaving his house in the Palermo district of Buenos Aires by Kurt Gustav Wilckens, a German anarchist worker, who threw a homemade shrapnel bomb and fired four shots at him, in accordance with the four shots that Varela himself ordered to the firing squads in Patagonia.
