= Osvaldo Bayer =

Argentine writer and journalist

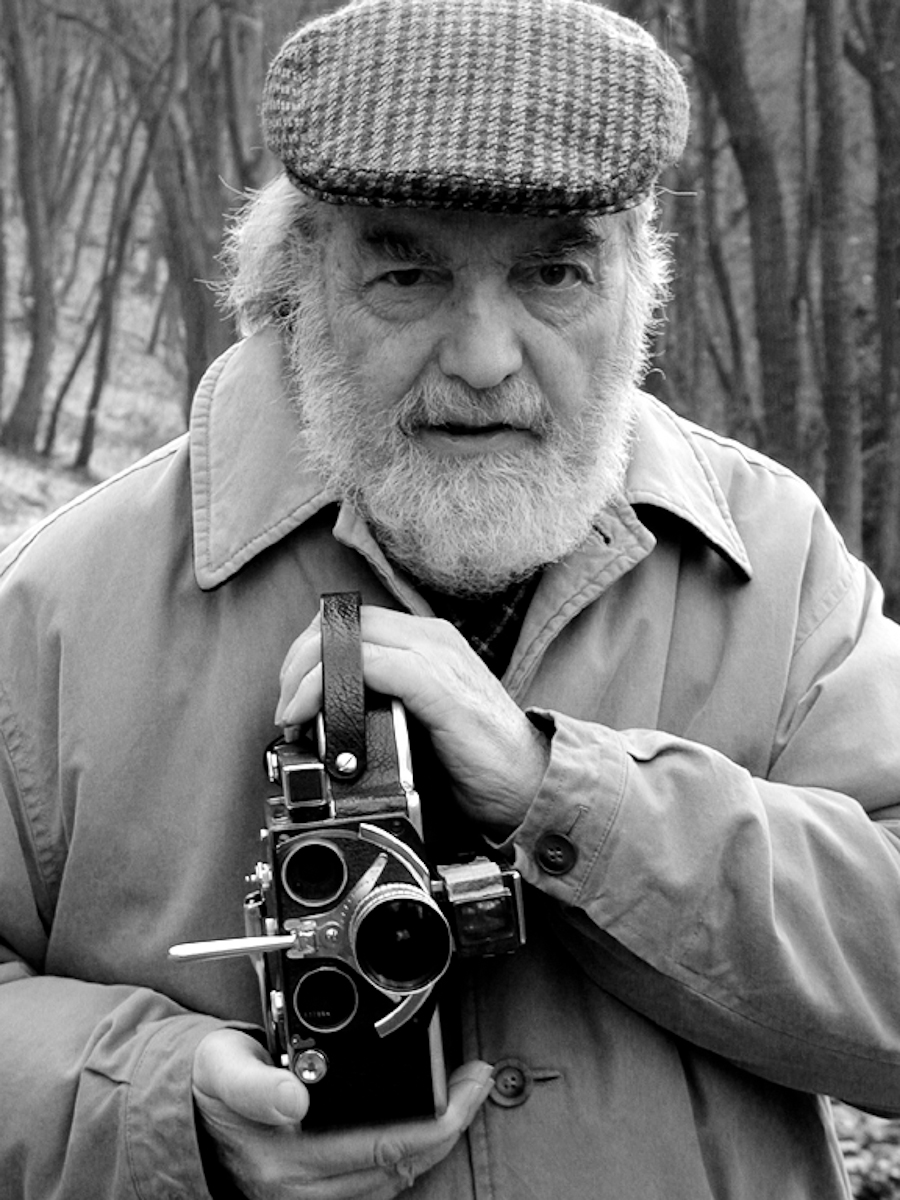
Osvaldo Bayer. Linz am Rhein, 1999

Osvaldo Bayer (18 February 1927 – 24 December 2018) was an Argentine writer and journalist. He lived in Buenos Aires. In 1974, during the presidency of Isabel Perón, he went into exile, residing in Linz am Rhein, Germany, throughout the National Reorganization Process dictatorship (1976–1983).

== Biography ==
Osvaldo Bayer was a self-defined "ultra-pacifist anarchist". He was born in the capital city of Santa Fe, and grew up in Bernal and in the Belgrano neighborhood in the capital city of Buenos Aires. His parents lived in the Patagonian town of Rio Gallegos, an experience that would later become the inspiration for his Rebellious Patagonia, a historical reconstruction of a massacre of striking rural workers during the Rebellion in Patagonia.

After having worked for an insurance firm and on the merchant marine as an apprentice helmsman, he studied history in the University of Hamburg, Germany, from 1952 to 1956, and became a member of the Socialist Students’ League.

After his return to Argentina, he dedicated himself to journalism and research into the history of Argentina, as well as writing film scripts. He studied medicine for a year, then philosophy at Buenos Aires. According to him,

Perón had given the School of Philosophy and Humanities over to Catholic Fundamentalism and the Right, so you only saw Saint Thomas and Saint Augustine. The CEU, Centro de Estudiantes Universitarios [University Students’ Center] were the Peronists who dominated the school and kicked the shit out of you. Their boss was Jorge Cesarsky, you remember...After that, I continued with journalism until [eventually] I accepted to go to Patagonia [with the Esquel newspaper]

Disgusted by local socialist policies, he turned towards the Federación Libertaria Argentina (FLA), having already been acquainted to anarchist literature during his time in the German Socialist Students' League.

He also founded the Department of Human Rights in the School of Philosophy and Humanities of the University of Buenos Aires.

He worked at the newspapers Noticias Gráficas, Clarin and Esquel, a local newspaper in the Patagonian town of Esquel. In 1958 he founded La Chispa ("The Spark"), considered to be the first independent newspaper in the history of Patagonia.

A year later, he was accused by Pedro Aramburu's military regime of disseminating sensitive information and forced by the National Gendarmerie to leave Esquel. Thereafter, Bayer was from 1959 to 1962 general secretary of the Press Syndicate. Immediately after being expelled from Esquel, he was hired by the national daily Diario Clarín, where he became Chief of Politics' section. He had, under his direction, the journalist Félix Luna, who founded in 1963 the history magazine Todo es Historia, to which Bayer collaborated.

During Isabel Perón's regime, Bayer's life was threatened several times due to the content of his work, particularly his book Rebellion in Patagonia, which dealt with the massacre of striking farmhands in Patagonia during the early 1920s, under Hipólito Yrigoyen's rule. In 1974, Héctor Olivera's adaptation of Rebellion in Patagonia, which won the Silver Bear at the Berlin International Film Festival, was banned in Argentina and the lives of individuals involved in the film's production were threatened by the Argentine Anticommunist Alliance. He was then forced into exile in West Germany in 1975, when the Dirty War was just beginning. In response to a dismissive comment by Ernesto Sabato that Argentina's exiled intellectuals were "the ones who escaped," Bayer attempted to organize a charter flight to Argentina in 1981 that would include a group of prominent Latin American and European intellectuals, including Gabriel García Márquez, Osvaldo Soriano, Julio Cortázar, Juan Rulfo and Gunter Grass, as a protest against the dictatorship; either they would be imprisoned, which would create an international scandal, or their celebrity would protect them, which would give them the opportunity to open a free school giving classes on literature, democracy and human rights. Cortázar backed out, however, saying "I don't want to go just to get shot in the head," and the plan fell apart soon afterwards. Bayer only returned to Argentina after Raúl Alfonsín's 1983 election and the transition to democracy. In 1984, he collaborated with the poet Juan Gelman on a book on exile.

Bayer's best-selling book on the Italian anarchist Severino Di Giovanni, was banned by President Raúl Alberto Lastiri (1973), as was La Patagonia Rebelde, his second work, by Isabel Perón; others were burnt by the military after they took power in 1976. Francesco Rosi, who directed Christ Stopped at Eboli, planned to make a film adaptation of his book on Di Giovanni, but renounced the project after the 1969 Piazza Fontana bombing, saying it was not the time to make a film about a terrorist.

=== Transition to democracy ===
He was nominated Doctor Honoris Causa on 20 April 2003 by the Universidad Nacional del Centro de la Provincia de Buenos Aires for his work in the fields of human rights, literature and journalism. On this day, he alluded to his forced exile, stating that:

I shall never forget the dictatorship for having forced me to go because I wrote La Patagonia Rebelde (...). But this is nothing compared to those who lost their lives or their sons (...). When I had to go, the Air Forces brigadier who was in Ezeiza told me: you will never walk on the fatherland's earth again. And today, not only do I walk on my fatherland, but they grant me an award.

Bayer was involved in the struggle for Indigenous rights. Fifteen days after having been declared "Illustrious Citizen of Buenos Aires" by the mayor Aníbal Ibarra, he was declared persona non grata by the Senate (an initiative of Eduardo Menem) for having proposed the unification of the Argentinian and Chilean Patagonia, as the "first step for a common Latin-American market".

As of 2008, he collaborated with the newspaper Página 12, founded Jorge Lanata. He was the author of the scenario of the film La Patagonia Rebelde, adapted from his book and realized by Héctor Olivera, which won the Silver Bear Award in the 1974 Berlin International Film Festival. He also wrote the screenplay of the 1988 film La Amiga, a drama on the dictatorship.

Bayer died on 24 December 2018 in Buenos Aires, at the age of 91.

== Legacy and 2025 monument controversy ==
In March 2025, Argentina’s National Road Authority (Vialidad Nacional) demolished a monument to Osvaldo Bayer located near Río Gallegos, Santa Cruz. The piece, inaugurated in 2023, featured Bayer’s silhouette and referenced his work on the Patagonian strikes. Authorities cited safety concerns and lack of authorization, but the removal drew criticism from Bayer’s family, local officials, and cultural figures, who viewed it as an attack on historical memory.

== Bibliography ==
- Severino Di Giovanni, el idealista de la violencia (1970).
- Rebellion in Patagonia (originally published in four volumes between 1972 and 1975)
- The Anarchist Expropriators (1975)
- Exilio (with Juan Gelman, 1984)
- Fútbol argentino (1990).
- Rebeldía y esperanza (1993)
- En camino al paraíso (1999)
- Rainer y Minou (2001)
- Ventana a la Plaza de Mayo (2006)

== Filmography ==
Excerpt from "Los cuentos del timonel".

- Asylum, Short documentary. Director: Friedrich Klütsch. Osvaldo Bayer wrote the script together with Cengiz Doğu und Urs M. Fiechtner. The film was awarded the Prize of German Film Critics at the Internationale Kurzfilmtage Oberhausen. 1984
- Los cuentos del timonel by Eduardo Montes-Bradley. The film features Osvaldo Bayer in Germany. Heritage Film Project, 2001.
