= Iñaki Urlezaga =

Argentine ballet dancer

Iñaki Urlezaga is an Argentine ballet dancer.

== Training and Career ==
He trained in his hometown of La Plata. She studied at the Instituto Superior de Arte del Columbus Theatre in Buenos Aires, where she received a scholarship to study at the American Ballet, where she stayed for a full year.

She joined the ballet of the Teatro Argentino de La Plata under the direction of Esmeralda Agoglia and in 1993 she joined the Ballet Estable del Teatro Colón where she was first figure.

In 1995 she joined the Royal Ballet of London at the invitation of Sir Anthony Dowell, where she danced until 2005 in all its seasons at Covent Garden. In 1999 he received the Konex Award in recognition as one of the best dancers of the decade in Argentina.

In 2005 he joined the Het National Ballet as a guest dancer, invited by the artistic director Ted Brandsen. He made his official debut in 2006 with Swan Lake at the Het Muziektheater Opera House. In 2006, he was the figure chosen to close the dance season at the Teatro Colón in Buenos Aires until its reopening for the bicentennial.

In 2000 he formed his own company, Ballet Concierto with which he performed in international stages and festivals in Europe, America, Asia, Oceania and Africa. Since 2003, and parallel to his career as a dancer, he has worked as a choreographer.

He has created several choreographies, such as Sylvia with music by Delibes, Floralis with music by Prokofiev; Danzaria with music by Vivaldi; Constanza with music by Chopin, The Nutcracker with music by Tchaikovsky; La Traviata with music by Verdi. Chopin's Tales', with music by F. Chopin, God Will Repay Him Swan Lake with music by Tchaikovsky, The Lady of Spades with music by Tchaikovsky.

In 2009 he premiered La Traviata in the province of Salta and immediately in Buenos Aires. <! --In 2010 he was invited as Argentine cultural ambassador to Expo Shanghai; by the Ministry of Culture of Argentina. In 2010 he premiered Nutcracker with his own choreography.

During 2013 the Argentine government appointed him artistic director of the newly created National Ballet, a position he held until December 2017.-->.

In 2018 he retired as a dancer, but continued his artistic career as a teacher and choreographer.

In 2019 he was invited by Yacobson Ballet of Russia to perform the choreography of La Dame de Picas, in a special celebration of the 220th anniversary of Pushkin's birthday.
