= La Plata =

Capital city of Buenos Aires Province, Argentina

- City
- Ciudad de La Plata
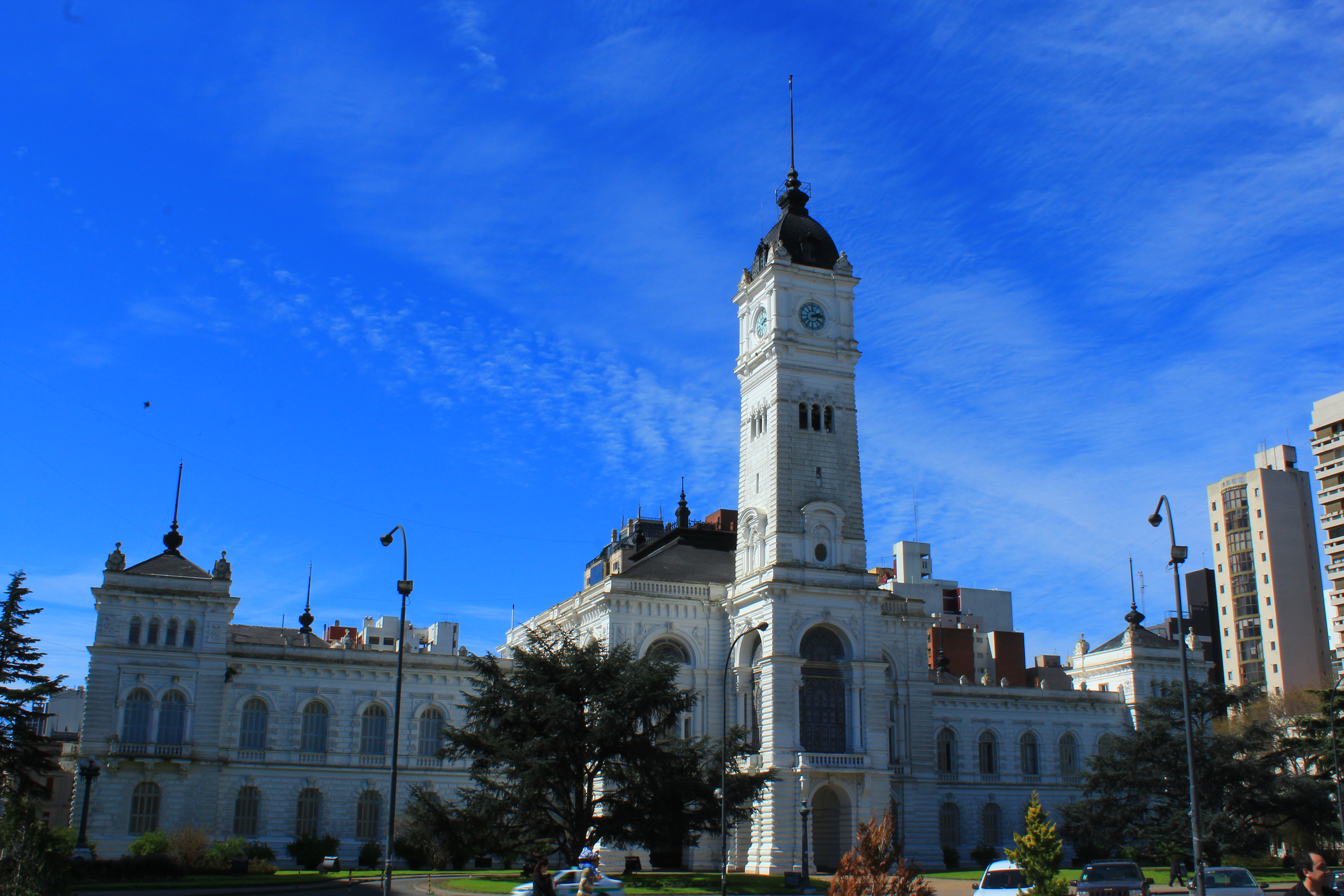
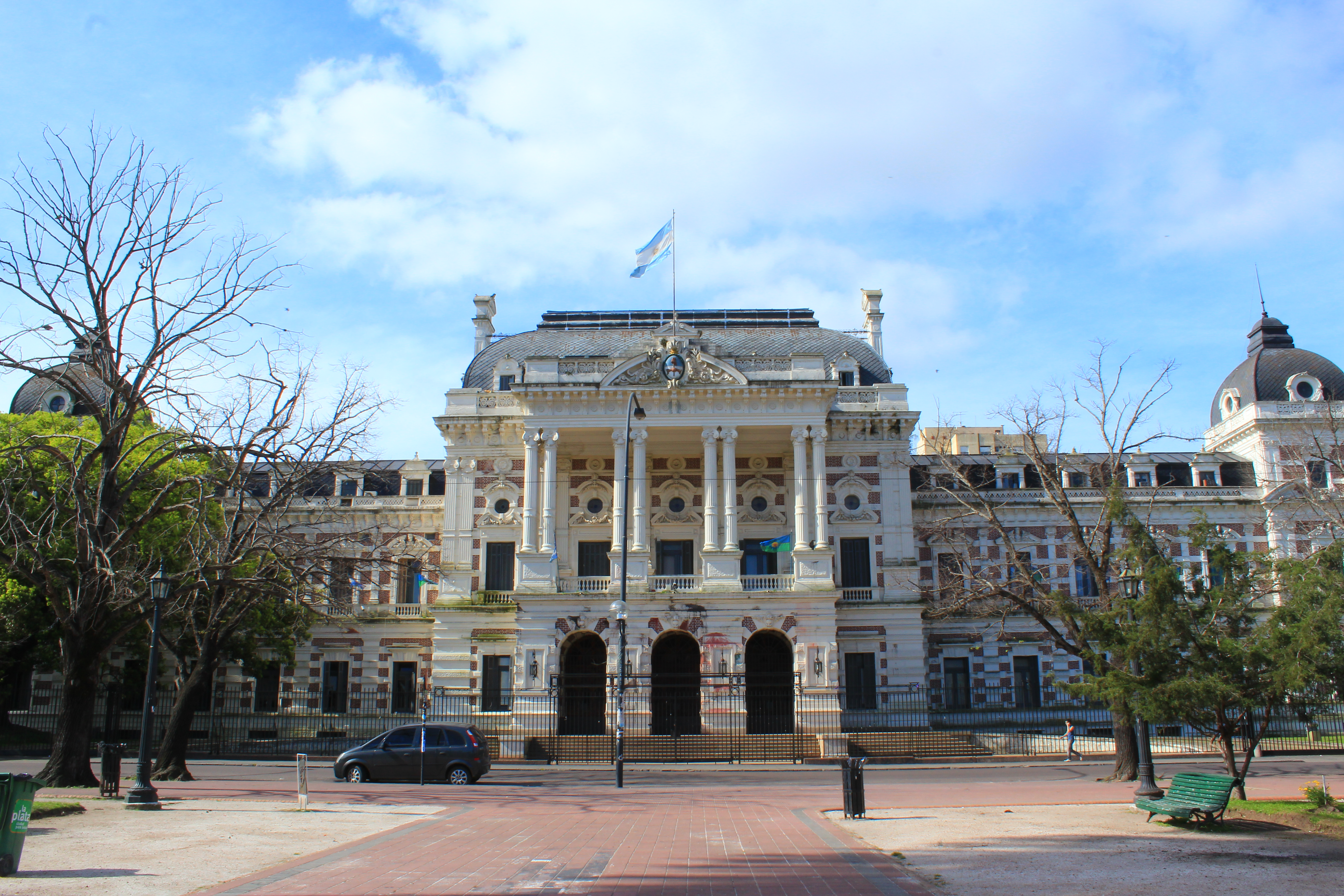
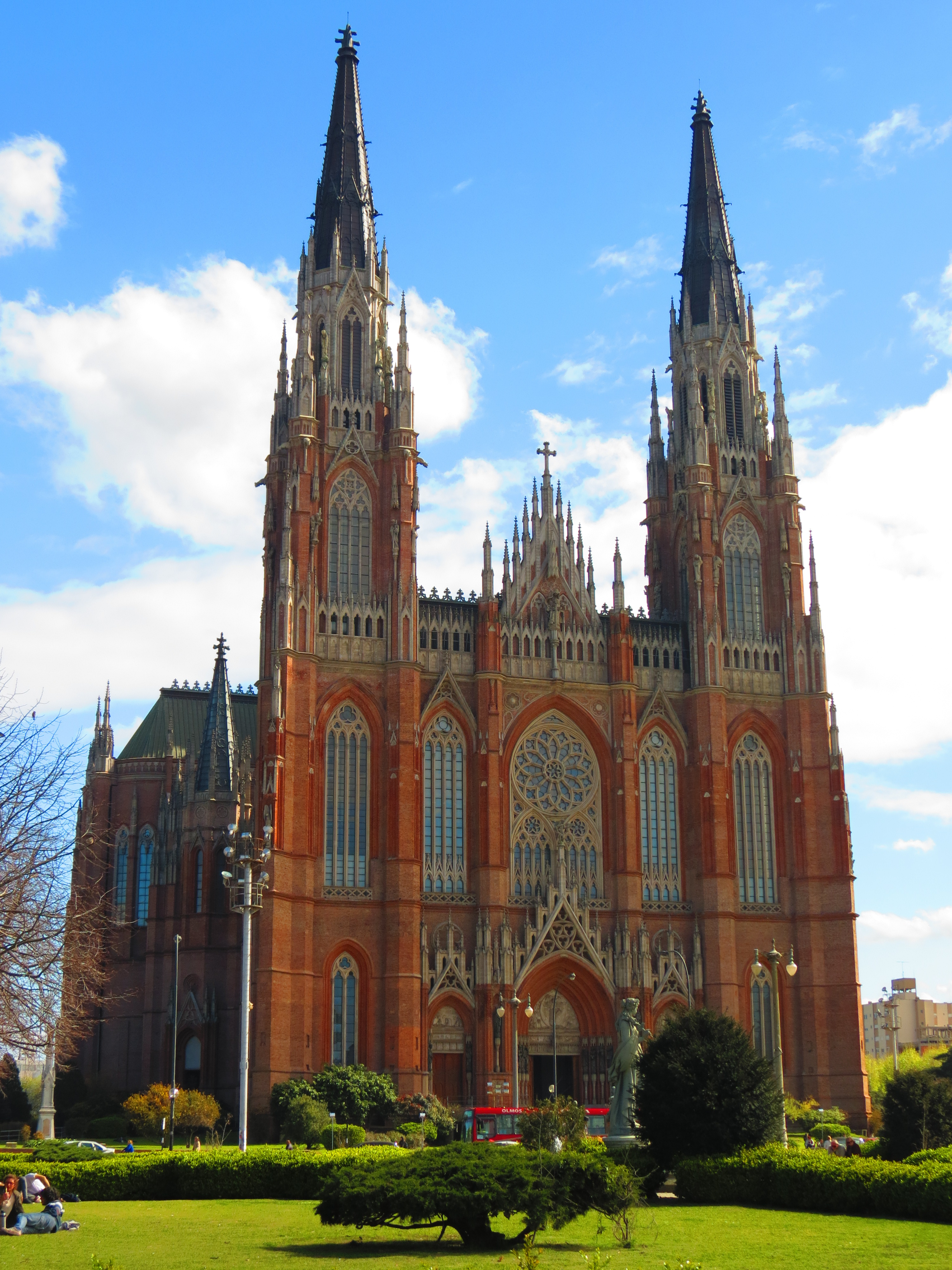
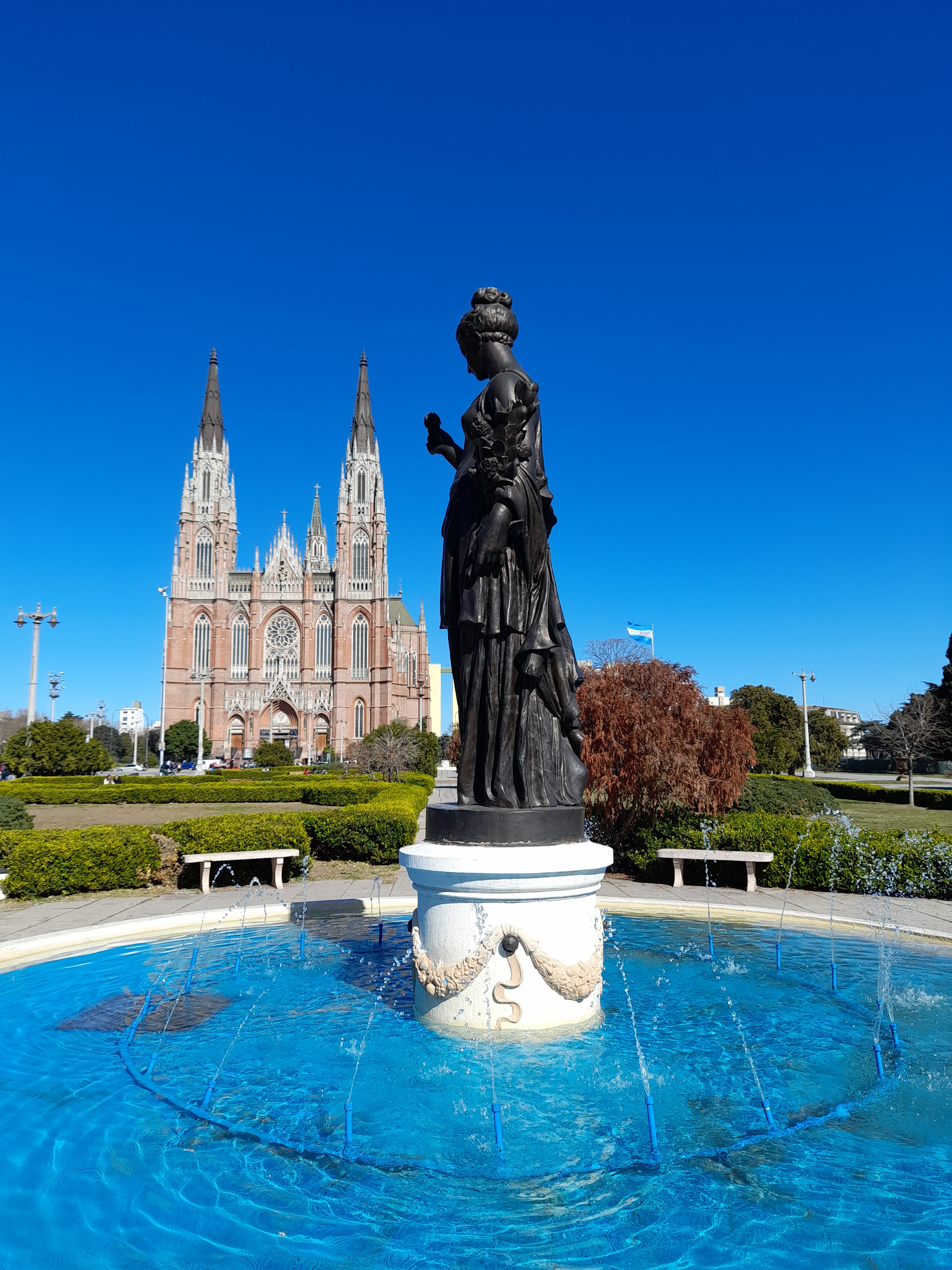
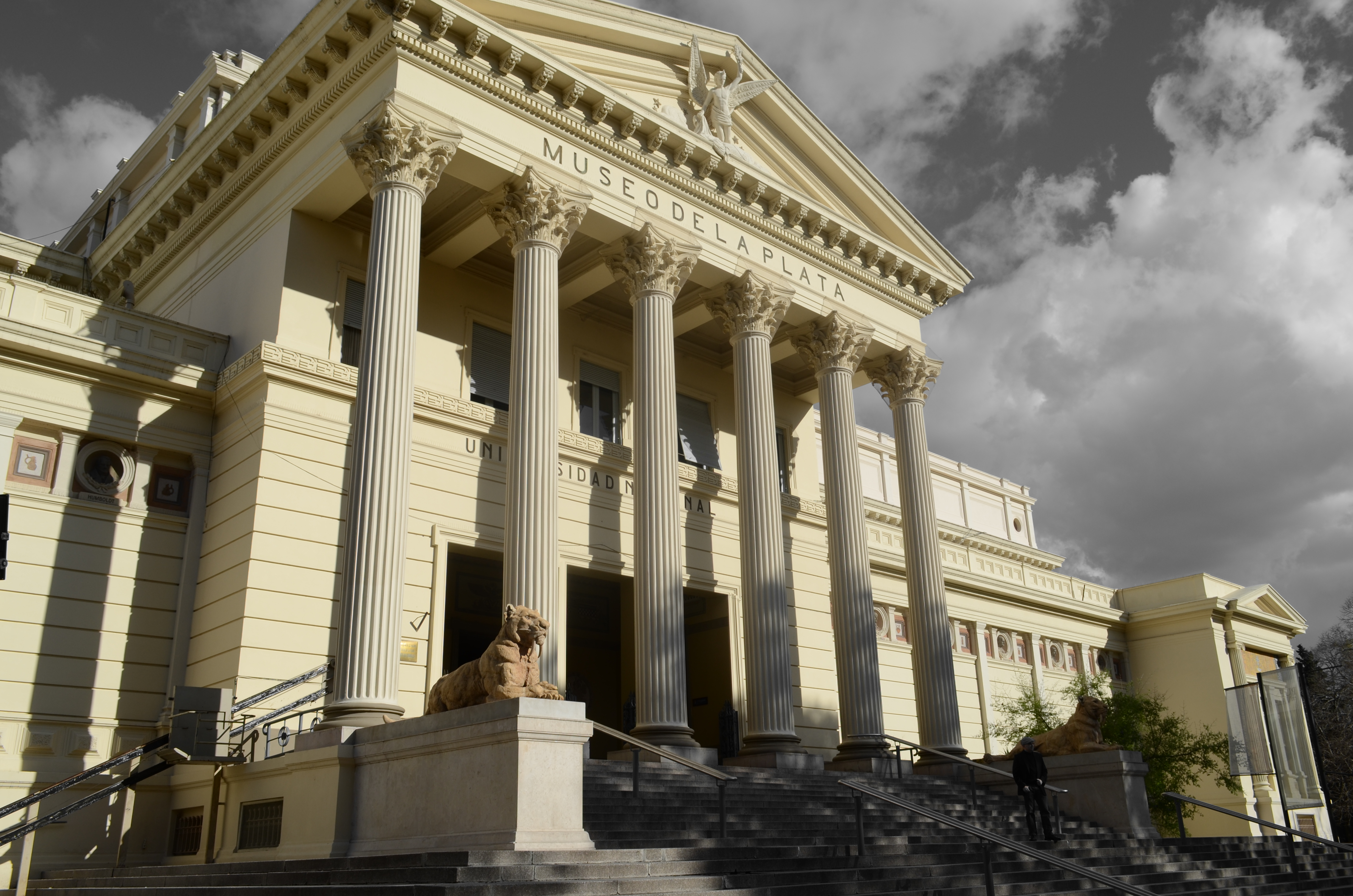
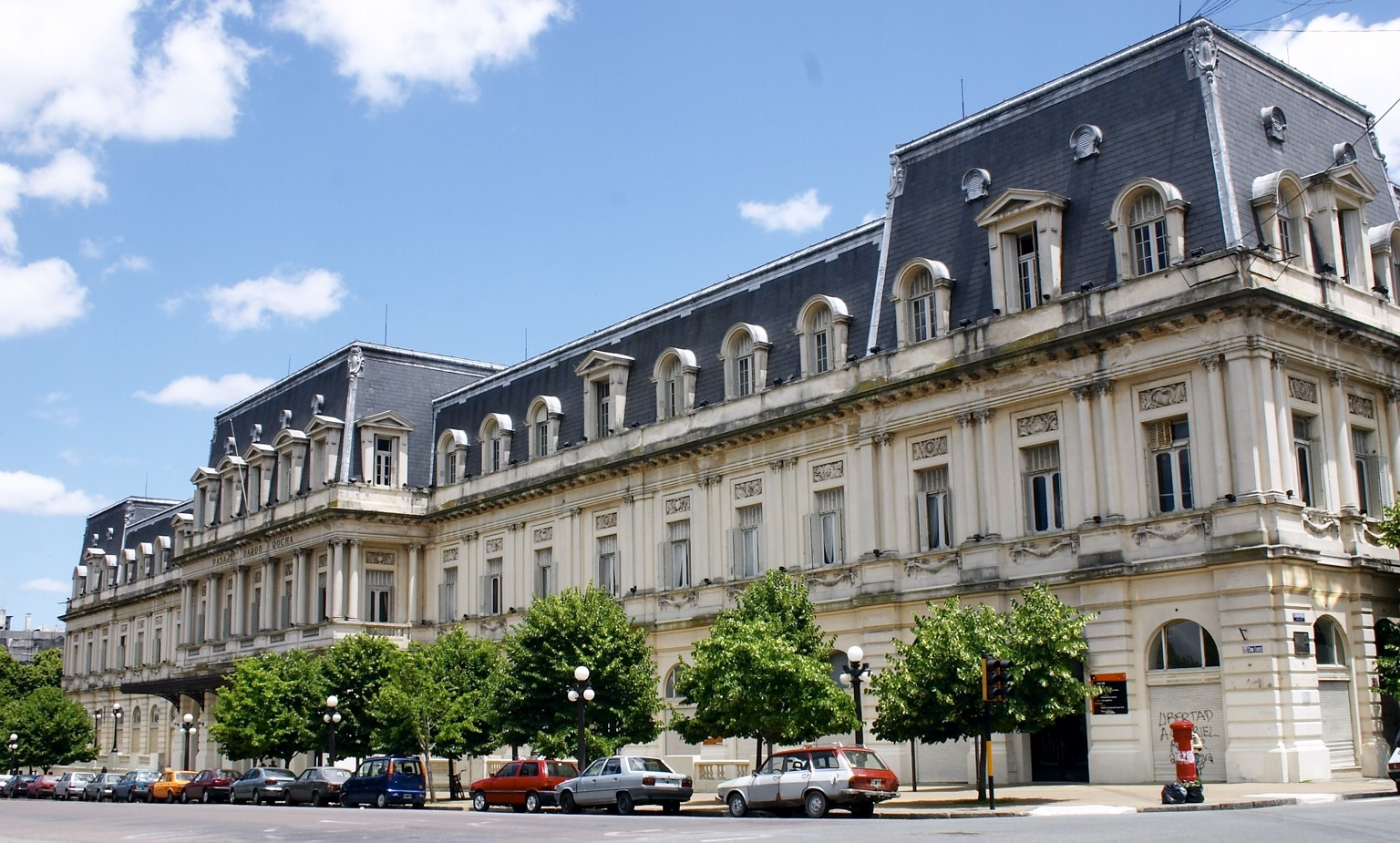
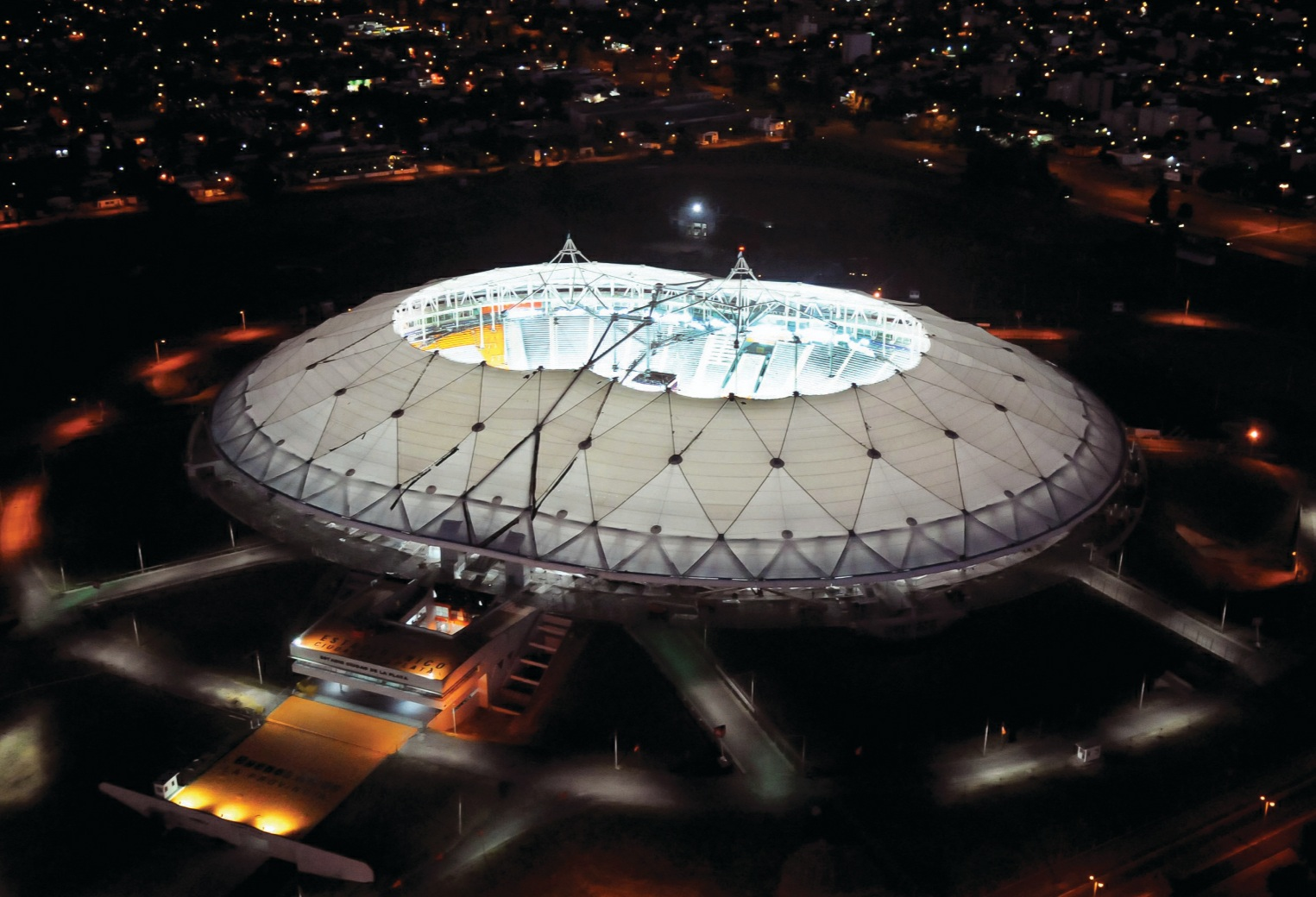
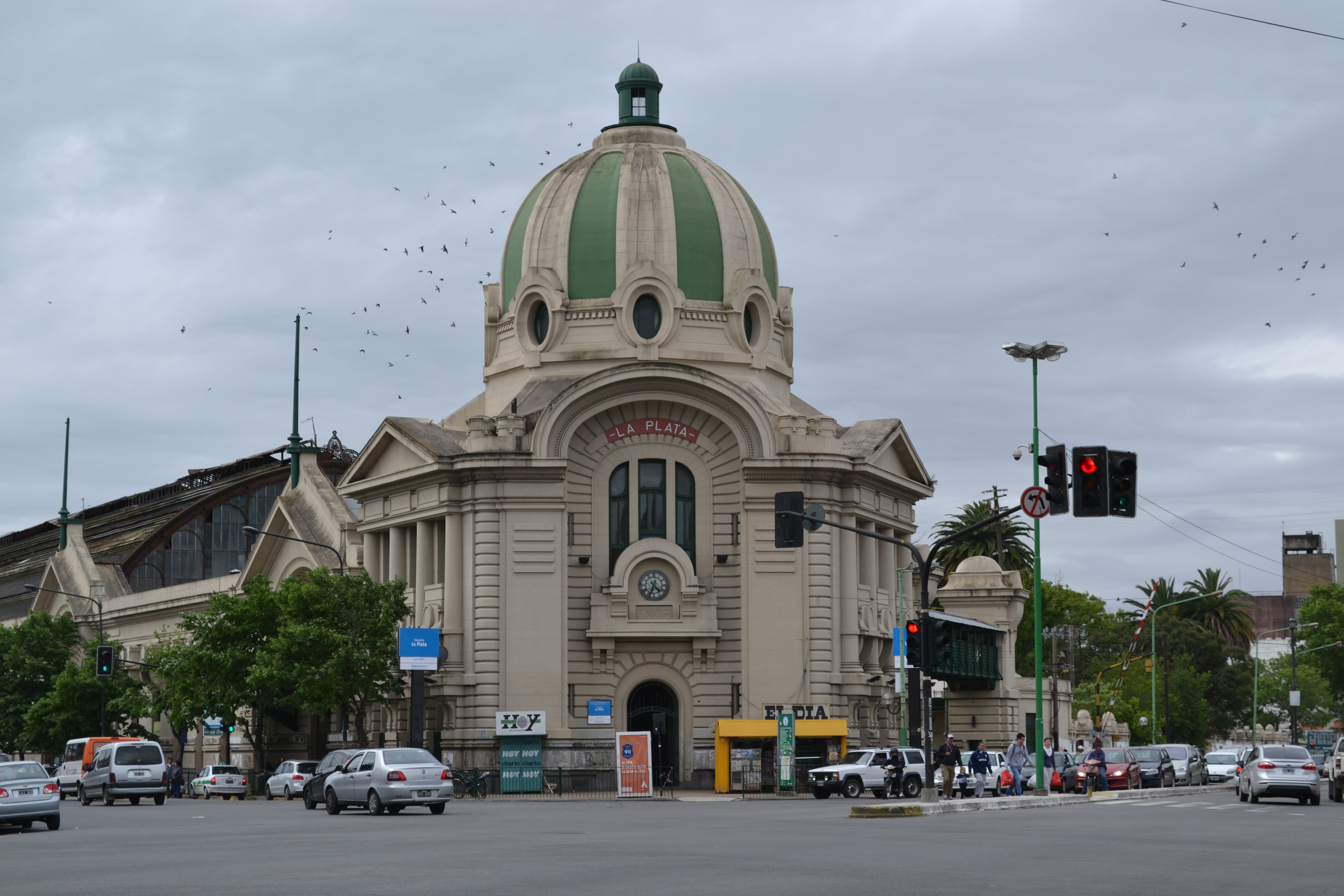
- La Plata City Hall Buenos Aires Government House Cathedral of La Plata Sculptures in the Plaza Moreno La Plata Museum Dardo Rocha Passage Cultural Center Estadio Único Diego Armando Maradona La Plata railway station

- Seal

- Location within Buenos Aires Location within Argentina Location within South America
- Coordinates: 34°55′16″S 57°57′16″W
- Country: Argentina
- Province: Buenos Aires
- Partido: La Plata
- Founded: 19 November 1882
- Founder: Dardo Rocha

Government
  - Intendant: Julio Alak (PJ–UP)

Area
  - City: 27 km^{2} (10 sq mi)
- Elevation: 26 m (85 ft)

Population (2022)
  - City: 772,618
  - Rank: 4th in Argentina
  - Density: 29,000/km^{2} (74,000/sq mi)
  - Urban: 904,789
  - Metro: 924,000
- Demonym: platense

Metropolitan GDP (PPP, constant 2015 values)
  - Year: 2023
  - Total: $19.6 billion
  - Per capita: $21,400
- Time zone: UTC−3 (ART)
- CPA Base: 1900
- Area code: +54 221

La Plata (Spanish pronunciation: [la plata]) is the capital and largest city of Buenos Aires Province, Argentina. According to the 2022 census, the Partido department has a population of 772,618 and its metropolitan area, Greater La Plata, has 938,287 inhabitants. It is located 9 kilometers (6 miles) inland from the southern shore of the Río de la Plata estuary.

La Plata was planned and developed to serve as the provincial capital after the city of Buenos Aires was federalized in 1880. It was officially founded by Governor Dardo Rocha on 19 November 1882. Its construction is documented in photographs by Tomás Bradley Sutton. La Plata was briefly known as Ciudad Eva Perón (Eva Perón City) between 1952 and 1955.

== History and description ==
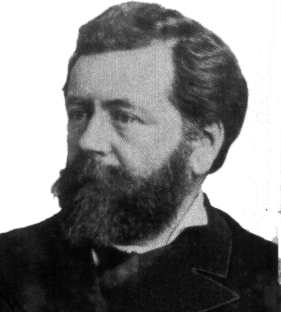
Governor Dardo Rocha (1838–1921), founder of La Plata

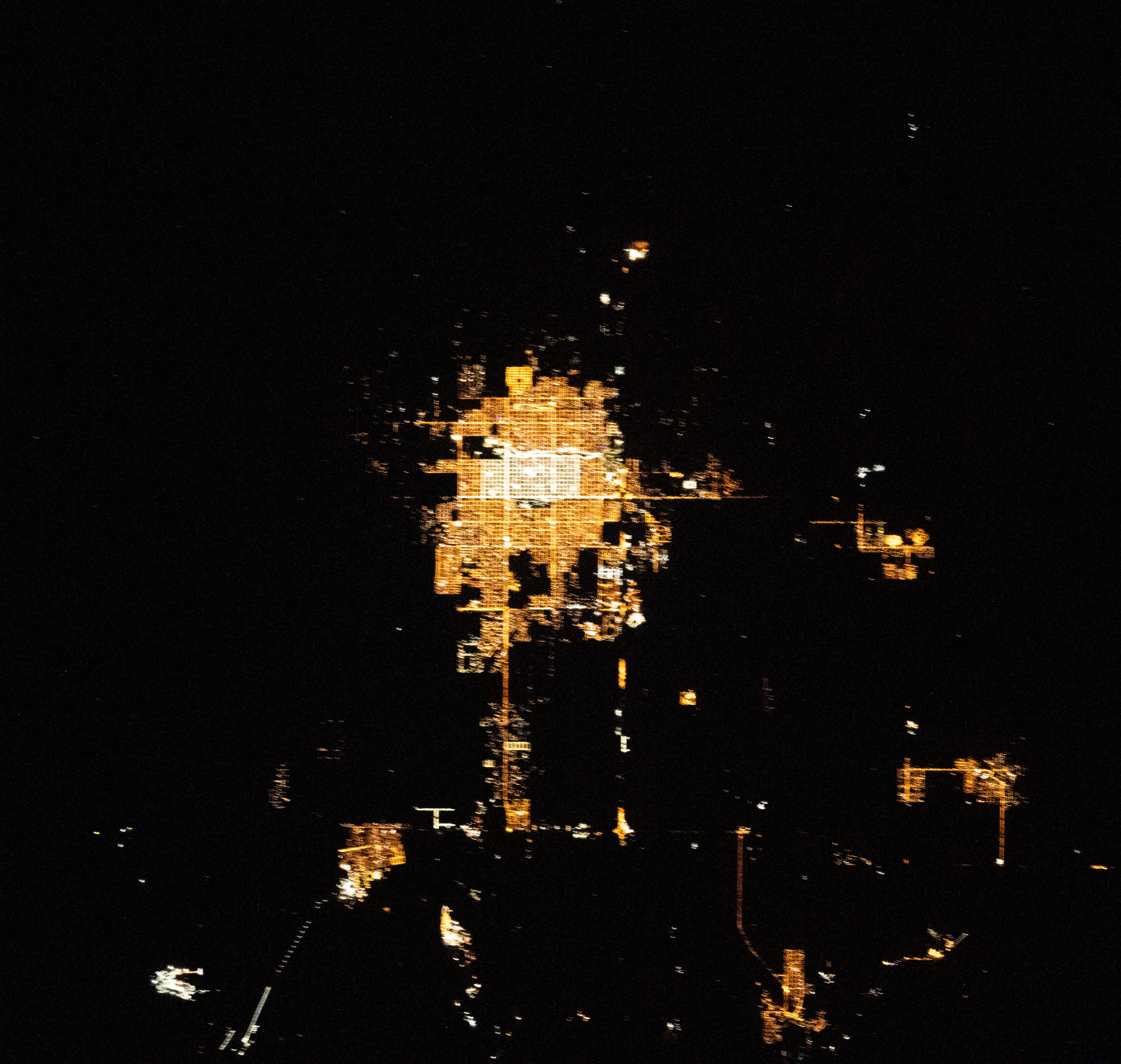
The city and vicinity at 8:19 pm locally on 4 July 2022, taken from the International Space Station.

After La Plata was designated the provincial capital, Rocha was placed in charge of creating the city. He hired urban planner Pedro Benoit, who designed a city layout based on a rationalist conception of urban centers. The city has the shape of a square with a central park and two main diagonal avenues, north to south and east to west. There are numerous other shorter diagonal streets. This design is copied in a self-similar manner in small blocks of six by six blocks in length. Every six blocks, there is a small park or square. Other than the diagonal streets, all streets are on a rectangular grid and are numbered consecutively. Thus, La Plata is nicknamed "la ciudad de las diagonales" (city of diagonals). It is also called "la ciudad de los tilos" (city of linden trees), because of the large number of linden trees lining the many streets and squares. The linden tree is one of a number of deciduous Northern Hemisphere tree species which dominate La Plata's parks and streets; ash, horsechestnut, plane, sweetgum and tulip tree are among the other examples. Palms and subtropical broadleaf evergreen trees thrive but are less common.

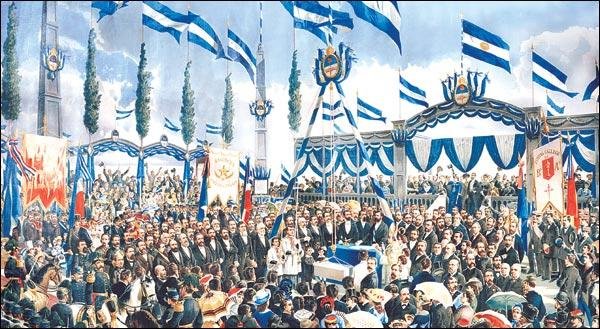
Period illustration of the 1882 placement of La Plata's foundation stone

The city design and its buildings are noted for their strong Freemason symbolism, since both Rocha and Benoit were freemasons.

The designs for the government buildings were chosen in an international architectural competition. Thus, the Governor's Palace was designed by Italians, the City Hall by Germans, etc. Electric street lighting was installed in 1884, and was the first of its kind in Latin America. Argentina's first electric tramway started in La Plata on 22 October 1892.

=== Important landmarks ===
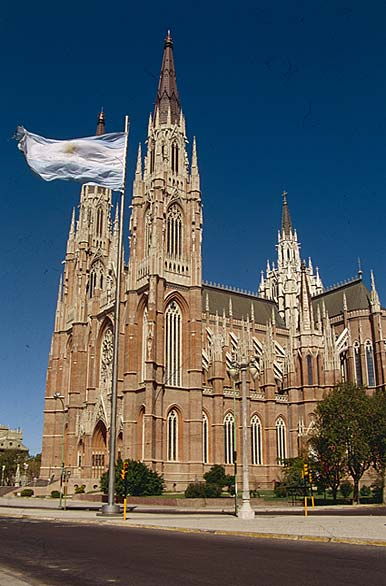
Cathedral of La Plata

The Neo-Gothic cathedral of La Plata is the largest church in Argentina. It is located on the central park, Plaza Moreno, and is the 58th tallest church in the world.

The Teatro Argentino de La Plata is one of the most important opera houses in Argentina, second to the Teatro Colón in Buenos Aires. The construction was funded by the first inhabitants of La Plata, but as maintenance was very expensive it was later donated to the Province of Buenos Aires. On 18 October 1977, the building was almost completely destroyed by a fire. This has been noted as one of the largest losses to La Plata's historical heritage. It was later replaced by a new building, which houses the theatre's orchestra, choir and ballet, boasting several halls.

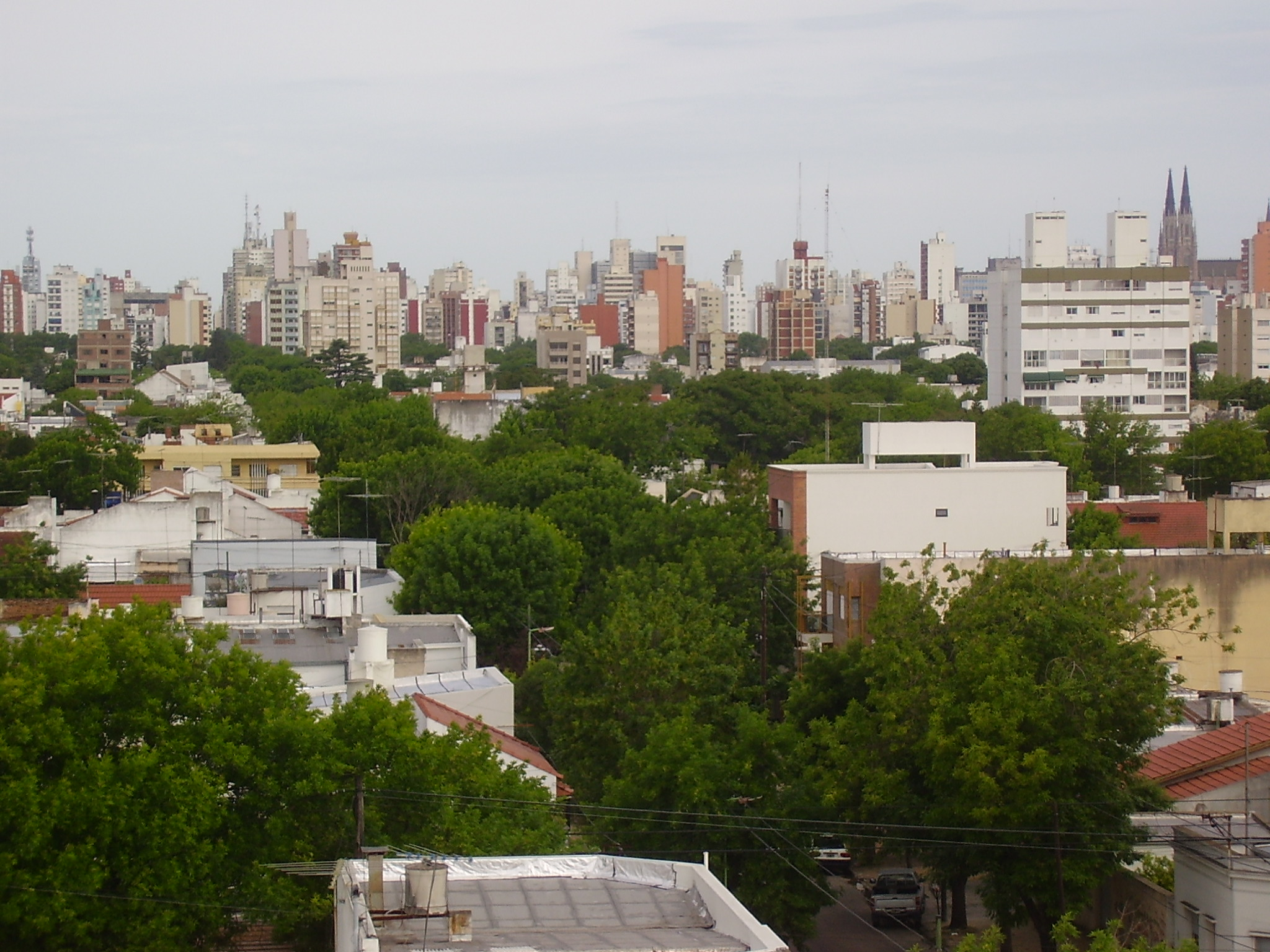
Panoramic view of La Plata

The Curutchet House is one of the two buildings by Le Corbusier built in the Americas.

The University of La Plata was founded in 1897 and nationalized in 1905. It is well known for its observatory and natural history museum. Ernesto Sabato graduated in physics at this university; he went on to teach at the Sorbonne and MIT before becoming a famous novelist. Doctor René Favaloro was another famous alumnus. During its early years, the university attracted a number of intellectuals from the Spanish-speaking world, such as Dominican Pedro Henríquez Ureña.

San Ponciano church is on the corner of 48th and 5th streets. It was the first chapel in La Plata. Pedro Benoit drew up the plans for the church. It was inaugurated on 19 November 1883, the first anniversary of the foundation of the city. Its Neo-Gothic style has been well-maintained, and the inner paintings restored. Then-governor Rocha called it "San Ponciano", in memory of his son Ponciano and in honor of Pope Pontian. Inside the church is the "Virgen de Luján" niche, moved there in 1904.

=== La Plata in the 20th century ===
Under Alvear's administration (1922–1928), Enrique Mosconi, the president of the state oil company Yacimientos Petrolíferos Fiscales, created the La Plata distillery, at the time the tenth largest in the world.

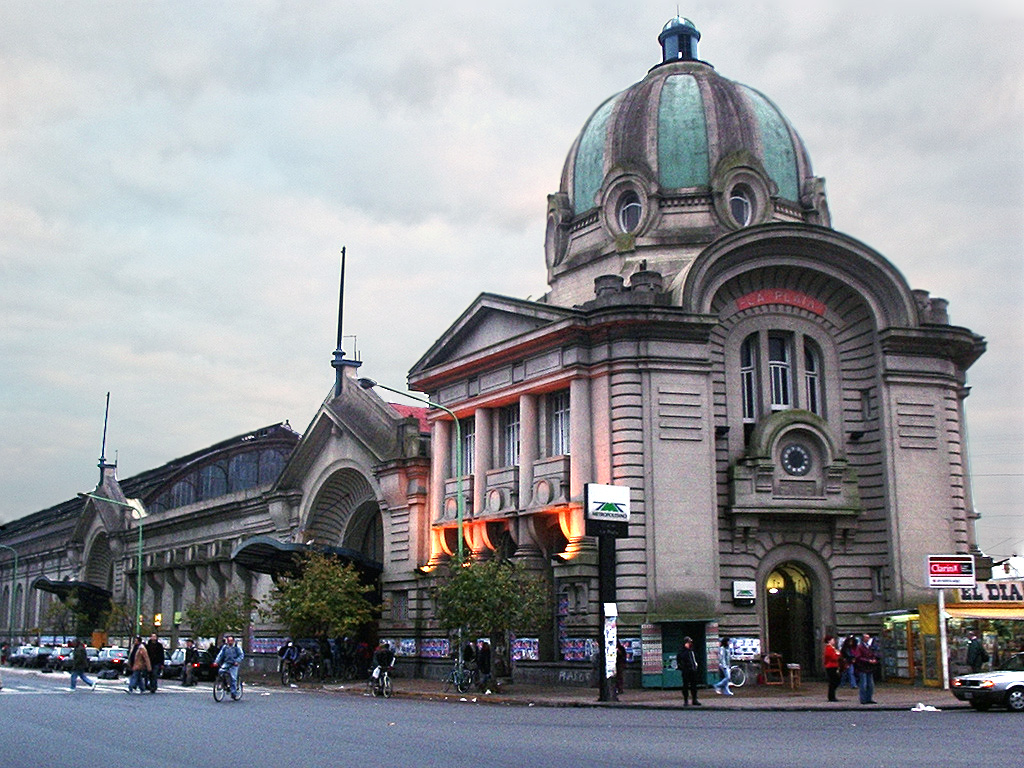
Railway station, La Plata.

On 10 December 1945, in the Parish church of St. Francis of Assisi in this city, Juan Domingo Perón and Eva Duarte were married.

In 1952, the city was renamed Ciudad Eva Perón; its original name was restored in 1955.

In March 1976, the Argentine military seized power following a coup d'état, which involved the disappearance of a number of students from La Plata. The military junta had implemented the National Reorganization Process, a set of policies used by the regime to destroy left-wing guerrilla forces and oppress resistance to its rule. The process included kidnappings, torture and murder. Meanwhile, the Montoneros, a leftist guerilla group, responded violently to the junta and its actions as they enlisted other Argentinians to join their campaign against the regime. Those enlisted included young, left-wing, politically active students from the organization named the Unión de Estudiantes Secundarios (UES) (Union of High School Students) of La Plata. UES was committed to achieving school reforms and other political reforms through demonstrations and protests that irked the ruling regime. Many of these students were kidnapped and killed (many remain desaparecidos) as part of the state's terrorism during the dictatorship.

In October 1998, UNESCO approved the city's bid for recognition as a World Heritage site. Approval is pending due to objections about maintaining architectural and landscape features during recent decades, which in the opinion of some specialists, has damaged the original design and contextual aesthetics.

=== Sports and stadiums ===
The city is home to two first division football teams: Estudiantes de La Plata and Gimnasia y Esgrima de La Plata.

Estudiantes de La Plata is the most successful club in the city, having won seven national tournaments, four Copa Libertadores and the Intercontinental Cup against the Manchester United in 1968. Past players include important Argentine players such as Osvaldo Zubeldía, Carlos Bilardo, Alejandro Sabella, Juan Ramón and Juan Sebastián Verón. Estudiantes has had a significant influence on the Argentine National Team, mainly through Bilardo in the 1986 World Cup. Its successes and its style of play, normally called bilardismo, have influenced the national style of football.

Gimnasia de La Plata, founded in 1887, has not won titles in the professional era.

The Estadio Ciudad de La Plata, also known as the Estadio Único, opened on 7 June 2003. A roof was added later. Estudiantes played in the new stadium from 2006 to 2019 while their own stadium was being modernized; Estudiantes returned to their traditional home ground of Jorge Luis Hirschi Stadium in 2019. Gimnasia La Plata has only played occasional home games in the Estadio Único. In 2011, the Estadio Ciudad de La Plata was one of the host sites for the 2011 Copa America including an opening-round match between Argentina and Bolivia, a semi-final game, and the third-place final. Now, the stadium is additionally used for concerts and Puma matches.

Jorge Luis Hirschi Stadium, the home ground of Estudiantes, is located on 1st Avenue in La Plata. Estadio Juan Carmelo Zerillo, the home ground of Gimnasia La Plata, is located in a park known as El Bosque.

During 2009, following a series of agreements between the city municipality, the governor of the province and the nation's presidency, progress was made in the final transfer of the land of the Paseo del Bosque to Estudiantes and Gimnasia La Plata clubs. On 24 June 2009, the Deliberative Council adopted the convention and the ordinance for which Gimnasia and Estudiantes clubs received "grants" for the lands on which their home grounds are currently located within El Bosque (The Forest).

=== Elections and civic advances ===
On 28 October 2007, Pablo Bruera was elected mayor with 26% of the votes, replacing Julio Alak, who had been mayor since 1991.

On 25 February 2009, La Plata debuted a parking system that uses text messaging (SMS), thus becoming the first city in Argentina to control parking using technology applications.

The Pasaje Rodrigo, a traditional "galería" (the older version of shopping malls in Argentina), reopened its doors in April 2009 as Pasaje Rodrigo shopping mall, after having been closed to the public for 10 years. It had originally been opened in 1929 by Spanish immigrant Basilio Rodrigo.

On 25 October 2015, Julio Garro was elected mayor with 41.35% of the votes, replacing Pablo Bruera, who had been mayor since 2007. Garro was reelected for a second term in 2019. In the 2023 local elections, former mayor Alak defeated Garro in a historically close election.

== Geography ==
=== Location ===
Located in the north-eastern area of the province of Buenos Aires, La Plata is surrounded by Ensenada and Berisso to the northeast, Berazategui and Florencio Varela to the northwest, San Vicente and Coronel Brandsen to the southwest and south, and Magdalena, to the southeast, occupying an area of 893 km^{2}.

The metropolitan area of La Plata includes the neighborhoods of Tolosa, Ringuelet, Manuel B. Gonnet, City Bell, Villa Elisa, Melchor Romero, Abasto, Gorina, José Hernández, Ángel Etcheverry, Arturo Seguí, Los Hornos, Lisandro Olmos, Villa Elvira and Altos de San Lorenzo, all of which have community centers that operate as local delegations.

=== Climate ===
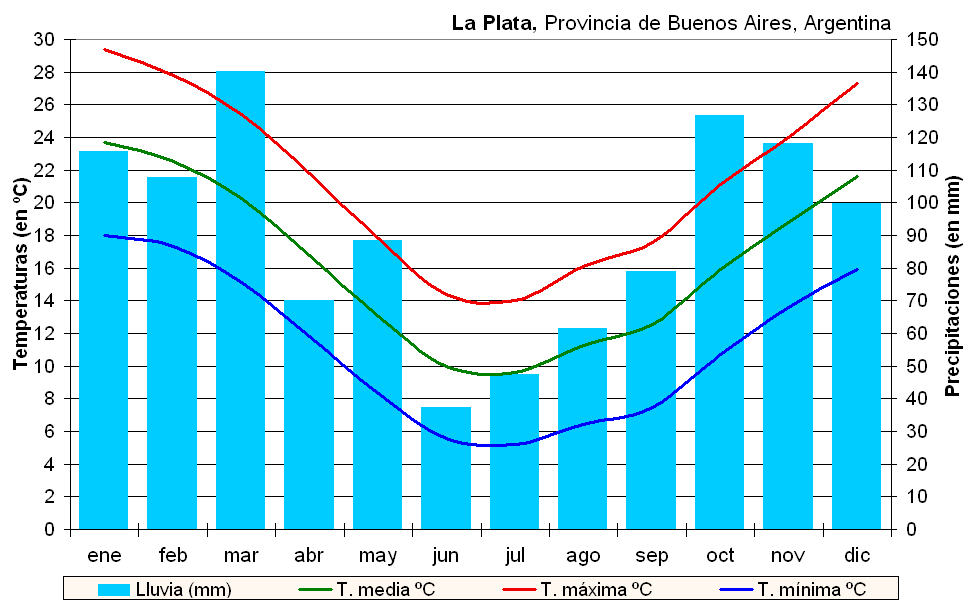
Climogram

La Plata has a humid subtropical climate (Cfa under the Köppen climate classification). During winter, temperatures are cool during the day and cold during the night, even reaching below freezing. The average temperature in the coldest month, July, is 8.9 °C (48.0 °F). Winters tend to be cloudier than summer, averaging around 10 overcast days from June to August, compared to 6 overcast days from December to February. Summers are warm to hot with a January high of 29 °C (84.2 °F) while nighttime temperatures are cooler, averaging 18 °C (64.4 °F). Spring and fall are transition seasons, featuring warm daytime temperatures and cool nighttime temperatures, highly variable with some days reaching above 32 °C (89.6 °F) and below 0 °C (32.0 °F). The city is fairly humid, owing to its coastal location, having an average monthly humidity higher than 75%. La Plata receives 1,092 millimetres (43 in) of precipitation annually, with winters being the drier months and summer the wetter months. On average, La Plata receives 2,285 hours of sunshine a year, or 51% of possible sunshine, ranging from a low of 41% in June and July to 62% in February. The highest temperature recorded was 41 °C (106 °F) on 14 January 2022 while the lowest temperature recorded was −5.7 °C (22 °F) on 14 June 1967.

Snowfall is extremely rare in the city with only 5 major snowfall events: July 1912, 1928, 22 June 1981, 9 July 2007 during the July 2007 Argentine winter storm, and on 6 June 2012.

Climate data for La Plata Airport (1991–2020, extremes 1961–present)
| Month | Jan | Feb | Mar | Apr | May | Jun | Jul | Aug | Sep | Oct | Nov | Dec | Year |
|---|---|---|---|---|---|---|---|---|---|---|---|---|---|
| Record high °C (°F) | 41.0 (105.8) | 38.1 (100.6) | 38.6 (101.5) | 33.6 (92.5) | 28.2 (82.8) | 25.5 (77.9) | 28.4 (83.1) | 30.1 (86.2) | 31.0 (87.8) | 33.5 (92.3) | 35.8 (96.4) | 39.9 (103.8) | 41.0 (105.8) |
| Mean daily maximum °C (°F) | 28.9 (84.0) | 27.8 (82.0) | 25.8 (78.4) | 22.1 (71.8) | 18.2 (64.8) | 15.1 (59.2) | 14.2 (57.6) | 16.4 (61.5) | 18.1 (64.6) | 21.0 (69.8) | 24.4 (75.9) | 27.5 (81.5) | 21.6 (70.9) |
| Daily mean °C (°F) | 23.1 (73.6) | 22.2 (72.0) | 20.2 (68.4) | 16.4 (61.5) | 13.0 (55.4) | 10.1 (50.2) | 9.2 (48.6) | 11.0 (51.8) | 12.8 (55.0) | 15.9 (60.6) | 18.8 (65.8) | 21.6 (70.9) | 16.2 (61.2) |
| Mean daily minimum °C (°F) | 17.4 (63.3) | 16.9 (62.4) | 15.2 (59.4) | 11.7 (53.1) | 8.7 (47.7) | 6.0 (42.8) | 5.2 (41.4) | 6.3 (43.3) | 7.9 (46.2) | 10.7 (51.3) | 13.4 (56.1) | 15.8 (60.4) | 11.3 (52.3) |
| Record low °C (°F) | 5.4 (41.7) | 4.1 (39.4) | 1.8 (35.2) | −0.2 (31.6) | −3.4 (25.9) | −5.7 (21.7) | −5.7 (21.7) | −3.8 (25.2) | −2.7 (27.1) | −1.2 (29.8) | 1.0 (33.8) | 1.3 (34.3) | −5.7 (21.7) |
| Average precipitation mm (inches) | 111.0 (4.37) | 112.8 (4.44) | 106.5 (4.19) | 98.2 (3.87) | 78.0 (3.07) | 58.6 (2.31) | 78.7 (3.10) | 67.5 (2.66) | 71.4 (2.81) | 101.0 (3.98) | 95.3 (3.75) | 93.7 (3.69) | 1,072.7 (42.23) |
| Average precipitation days (≥ 0.1 mm) | 8.1 | 7.1 | 7.2 | 7.4 | 6.3 | 6.1 | 6.5 | 6.3 | 6.9 | 8.5 | 7.9 | 7.2 | 85.4 |
| Average snowy days | 0.0 | 0.0 | 0.0 | 0.0 | 0.0 | 0.1 | 0.1 | 0.0 | 0.0 | 0.0 | 0.0 | 0.0 | 0.1 |
| Average relative humidity (%) | 72.2 | 75.7 | 79.1 | 82.2 | 85.1 | 84.4 | 83.7 | 81.4 | 79.0 | 78.6 | 74.3 | 70.8 | 78.9 |
| Mean monthly sunshine hours | 300.7 | 245.8 | 229.4 | 186.0 | 170.5 | 141.0 | 155.0 | 176.7 | 186.0 | 220.1 | 264.0 | 300.7 | 2,575.9 |
| Mean daily sunshine hours | 9.7 | 8.7 | 7.4 | 6.2 | 5.5 | 4.7 | 5.0 | 5.7 | 6.2 | 7.1 | 8.8 | 9.7 | 7.1 |
| Percentage possible sunshine | 57 | 62 | 55 | 55 | 48 | 41 | 41 | 48 | 48 | 52 | 54 | 52 | 51 |
Source 1: Servicio Meteorológico Nacional
Source 2: NOAA (percent sun 1961–1990)

==== Earthquakes ====
The region lies on the Punta del Este fault, and its latest event occurred on 30 November 2018 at 10:27 UTC−3 with a magnitude of 3.8 on the Richter scale. This earthquake was extremely unusual in La Plata, a city where the last earthquake had been on 5 June 1888 (128 years before) with a magnitude of 5.5 on the Richter scale.

== Government ==
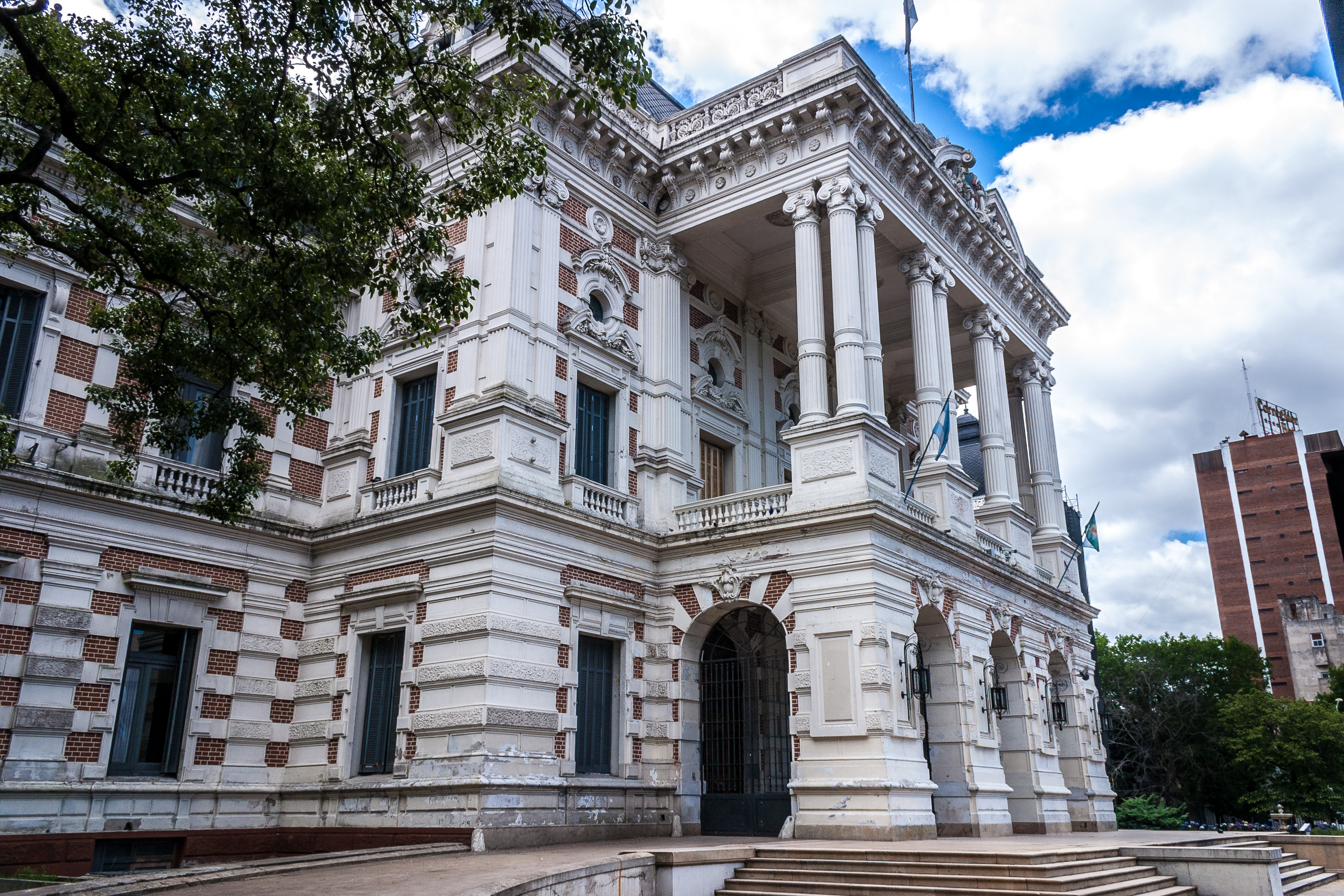
Casa de Gobierno de la Provincia de Buenos Aires.

Given the federal system of government in Argentina there are three orders or ranks: the National, Provincial and Municipal.

Power of the executive branch in La Plata is exercised by the municipal mayor, elected by popular vote every four years with the possibility of unlimited reelection. The town hall is known as the Palacio Municipal, and is located in the block surrounded by streets 51, 53, 11 and 12, in the city center. It is one of the important buildings that surround Plaza Moreno, and is opposite the cathedral.

The city government is divided into different areas. These are: Private Secretary, Secretary General, Ministry of Economy, Ministry of Public Management, Social Development Secretariat, Ministry of Culture, Ministry of Modernization and Economic Development, Ministry of Justice, Secretary of Health and Social Medicine, Chief of Staff, Regional Market La Plata, Management Consortium Puerto La Plata, Executive Unit Revenue Agency, Environment Agency Implementation Unit, Human Rights Department, Ministry of Government, Policy Planning Council, Regional Production and Employment, and the city council.

As it is the capital of the Province of Buenos Aires, La Plata is also home to the three provincial powers: the provincial executive (led at the moment by the Governor) along with its ministries, the judiciary, and the provincial Legislature.

== Economy ==
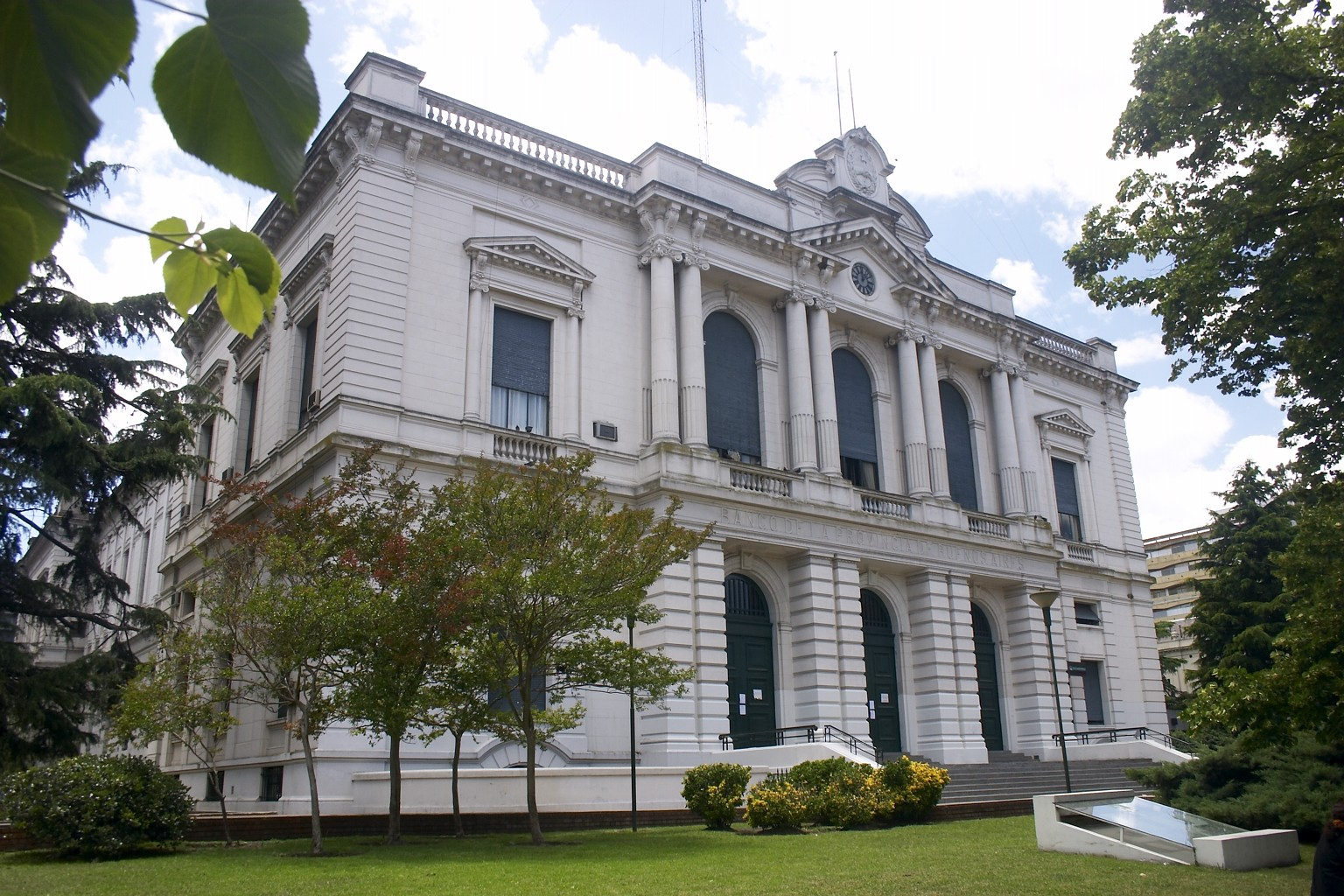
Banco Provincia headquarters in La Plata.

According to the National Economic Survey 2004–2005, out of a total of 23,844 local listings 90% are dedicated to the production of goods and services, 4% belonged to the Civil Service, 2% are for semi sideshows or removable; 1% are for worship, political parties and unions, and the remaining 2% was in the process of classification.

=== Finance ===
La Plata has a stock market, the Bolsa de Comercio, which was founded in 1960 and is a member of the Argentine stock market system.

In the city there are branches of major banks operating in the country, including Banco Nación, Banco Provincia, Banco Ciudad de Buenos Aires, Banco Hipotecario, HSBC, Citigroup, Banco Itaú, Francés, Macro, Standard Bank, etc.

== Transport ==
Trenes Argentinos operate a rail service (Roca Line) between La Plata station and Constitución station in Buenos Aires via Berazategui. It runs every 24 to 30 minutes Mondays to Saturdays and every 40 minutes on Sundays. In addition, there is a shuttle service Tren Universitario between La Plata station and Policlínico operating five to eight times a day.

The city's general aviation needs are served by La Plata Airport, although it has no commercial service as of 2023. The nearest commercially served airport is Ministro Pistarini International Airport in Buenos Aires.

== Population ==
The greater metropolitan area, according to the National Census of Population and Housing 2010, has a population of 787,294 inhabitants.

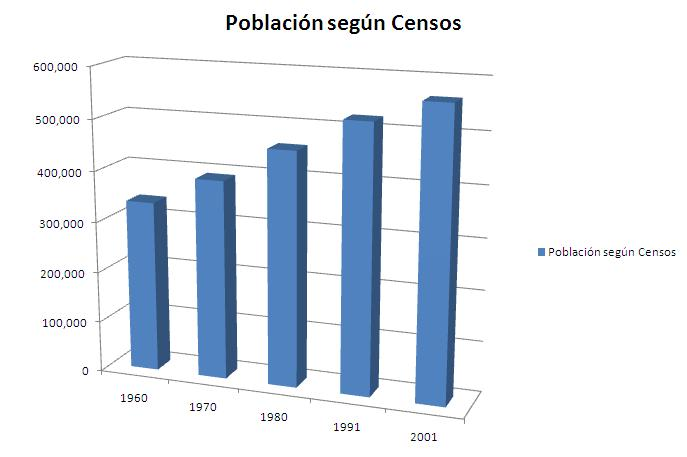
Evolution of the population of La Plata from 1960 to 2001.

Furthermore, the La Plata urban area's population since 1960 was developed as follows:

- 1960 Census: 337,060 inhabitants.
- 1970 Census: 391,247 inhabitants.
- 1980 Census: 459,054 inhabitants.
- 1991 Census: 521,759 inhabitants.
- 2001 Census: 763,943 inhabitants.
- 2010 Census: 799,523 inhabitants.

=== International communities ===
The Spanish community's contributions include the renowned Spanish Hospital. Spain has also acknowledged the community by installing a consulate in the city of La Plata.

The Arab community also has several institutions, including the Syriac Orthodox Welfare Assoc, Assoc Islamic Argentino de La Plata, and the Lebanese Society of La Plata.

The Jewish community of La Plata has numerous institutions. These include AMIA La Plata (Asociación Mutual Israelita Argentina), which has under its orbit Hebrew School Chaim Nachman Bialik and the Jewish cemetery of the city, the Beit Chabad La Plata, part of Chabad Lubavitch Argentina.

== Education ==
Statistics
Educational Institutions
| Educational Level | Total | State | Private |
|---|---|---|---|
| Nivel Inicial | 184 | 82 | 102 |
| Nivel Primario | 171 | 96 | 75 |
| Nivel Medio | 102 | 48 | 54 |
| Nivel Terciario o Superior no Universitario | 42 | 9 | 33 |
Students enrolled
| Educational Level | Total | State | Private |
| Nivel Inicial | 29.111 | 14.791 | 14.320 |
| Nivel Primario | 93.575 | 58.825 | 34.750 |
| Nivel Medio | 29.884 | 21.243 | 8.641 |
| Nivel Terciario o Superior no Universitario | 12.162 | 4.597 | 7.565 |

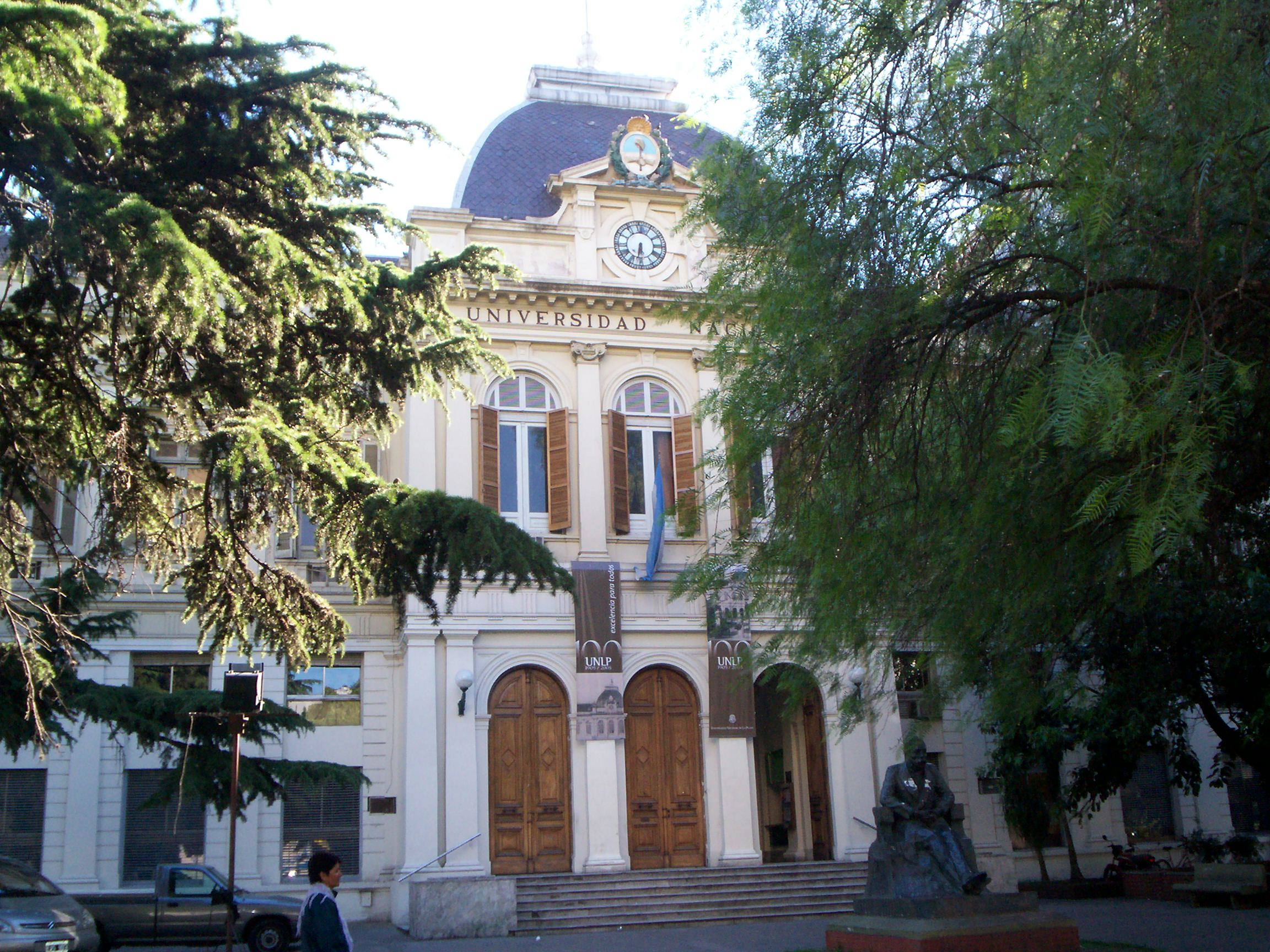
Presidencia de la UNLP.

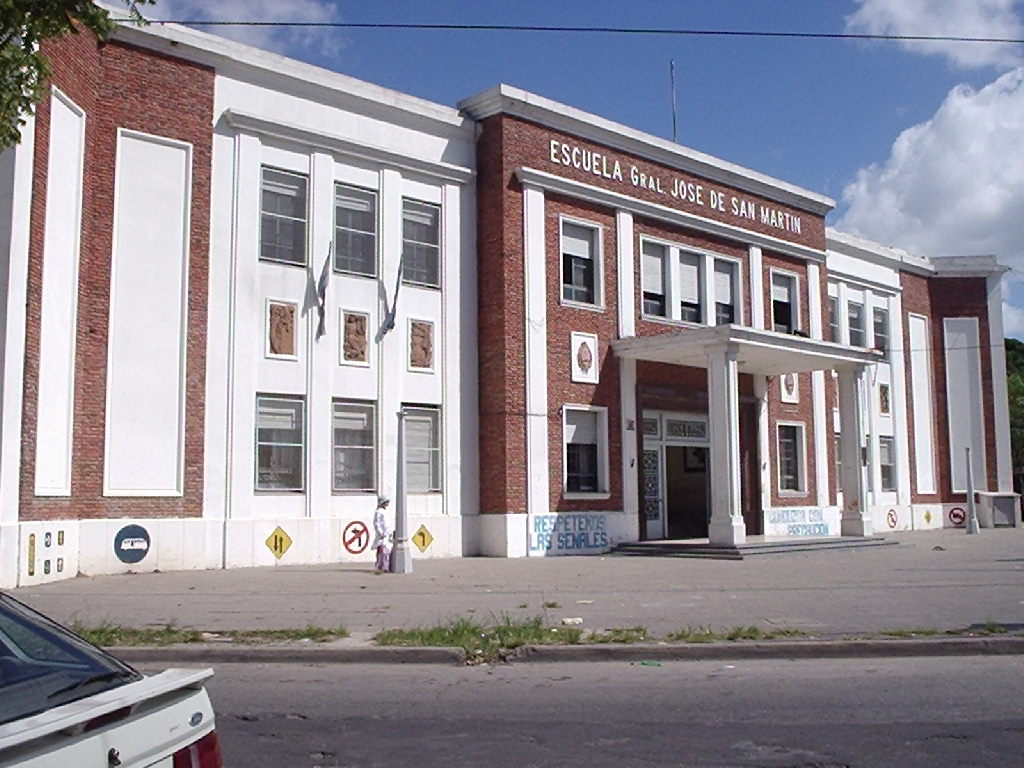
Number 19 School Gral. José de San Martín.

La Plata hosts one of the most renowned universities in Argentina, the National University of La Plata (Spanish: Universidad Nacional de La Plata, UNLP). It has over 75,000 regular students, 8,000 teaching staff, 16 faculties and 106 available degrees.

UNLP students and professors include:

- Raúl Alfonsín (Law degree in 1950) President of Argentina (1983–1989)
- Néstor Kirchner (Law degree) President of Argentina (2003–2007)
- Cristina Fernández de Kirchner (Law degree) President of Argentina (terms 2007–2011, 2011–2015)
- René Favaloro (Medicine degree in 1949, creator of the technique for coronary bypass surgery)
- Carlos Saavedra Lamas (Law teacher, rector and Nobel Peace Prize)
- Ernesto Sabato (Physics PhD in 1937)
- Mario Bunge (Physics-Mathematics PhD in 1952)
- Florentino Ameghino (Professor of geology)
- Juan José Arévalo (Philosophy PhD in 1934, 24th President of Guatemala)
- Emilio Pettoruti (painter)
- Pedro Henríquez Ureña (Dominican essayist, philosopher, humanist, philologist and literary critic)

Four high school institutes are under UNLP control and three of them are located in La Plata:

- Rafael Hernández National High School (Spanish: Colegio Nacional Rafael Hernández)
- Víctor Mercante Lyceum (Spanish: Liceo Víctor Mercante)
- Fine Arts High School (Spanish: Bachillerato de Bellas Artes)

La Plata is also home of four other universities:

- Universidad Católica de La Plata
- Universidad Notarial Argentina
- Facultad Regional de la Universidad Tecnológica Nacional.
- Universidad Del Este

Students come to these four universities from every part of Argentina, as well as other countries.

== City layout and architecture ==
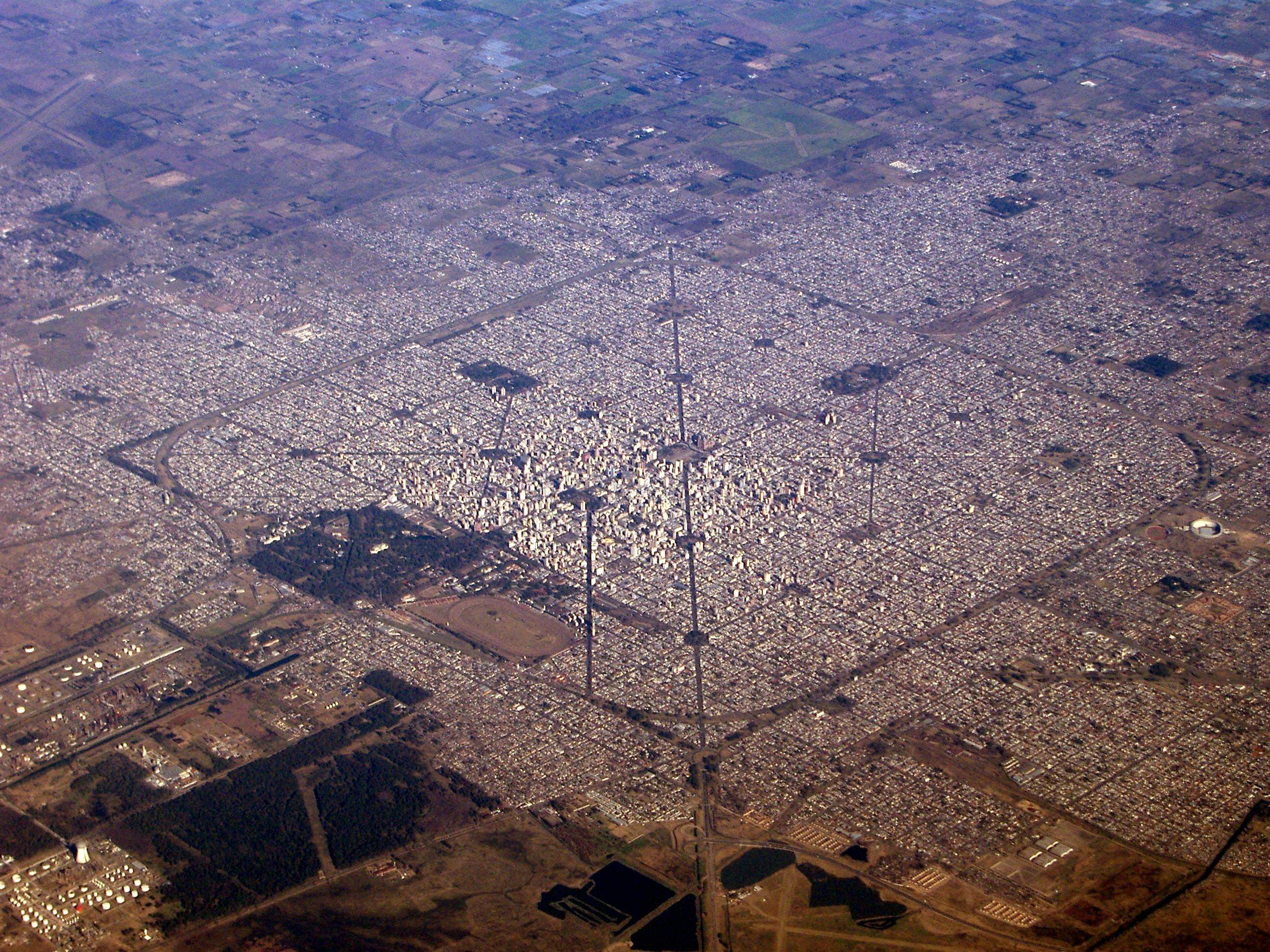
La Plata from the air.

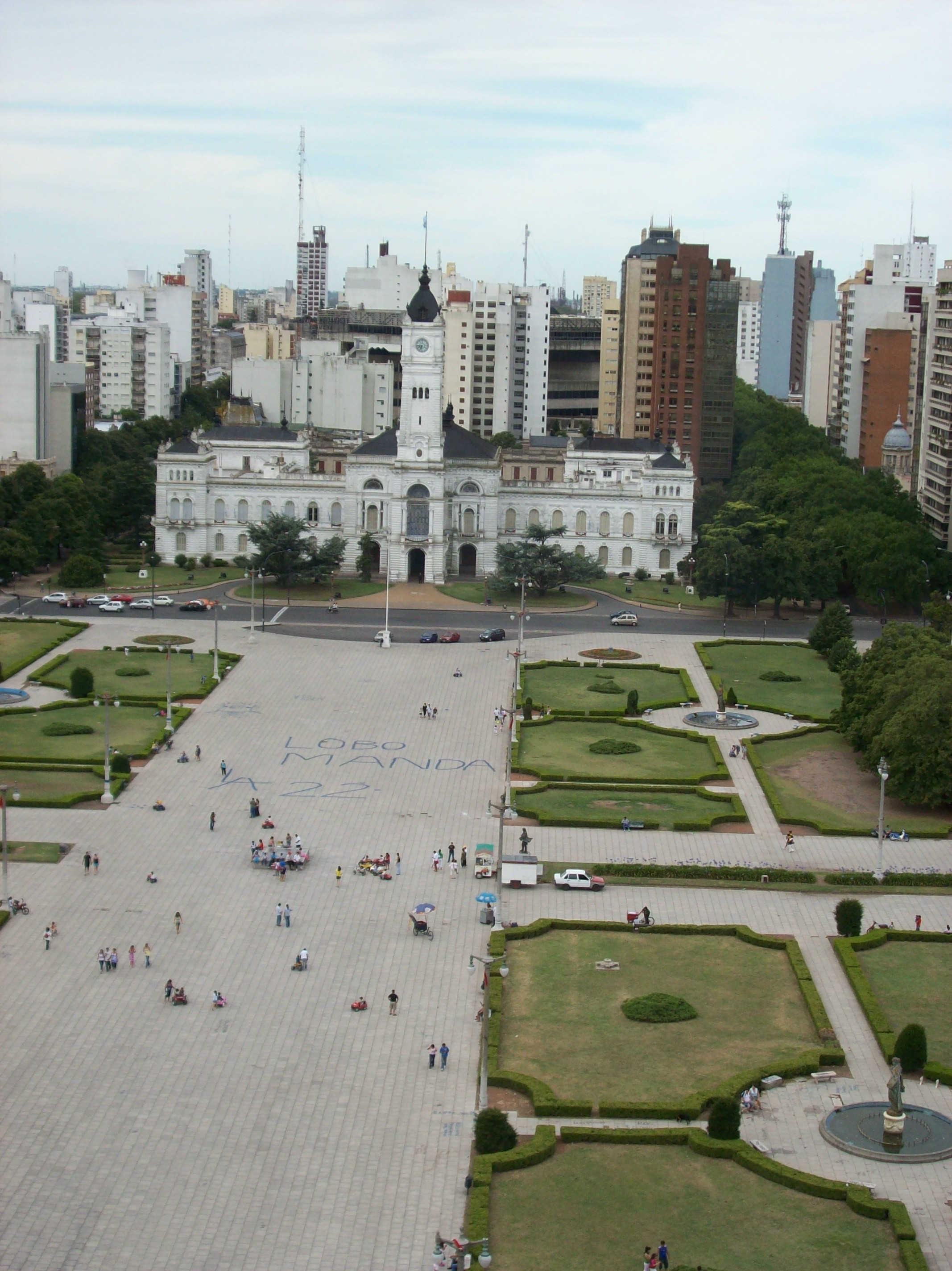
View of the City of La Plata and Plaza Moreno from the cathedral.

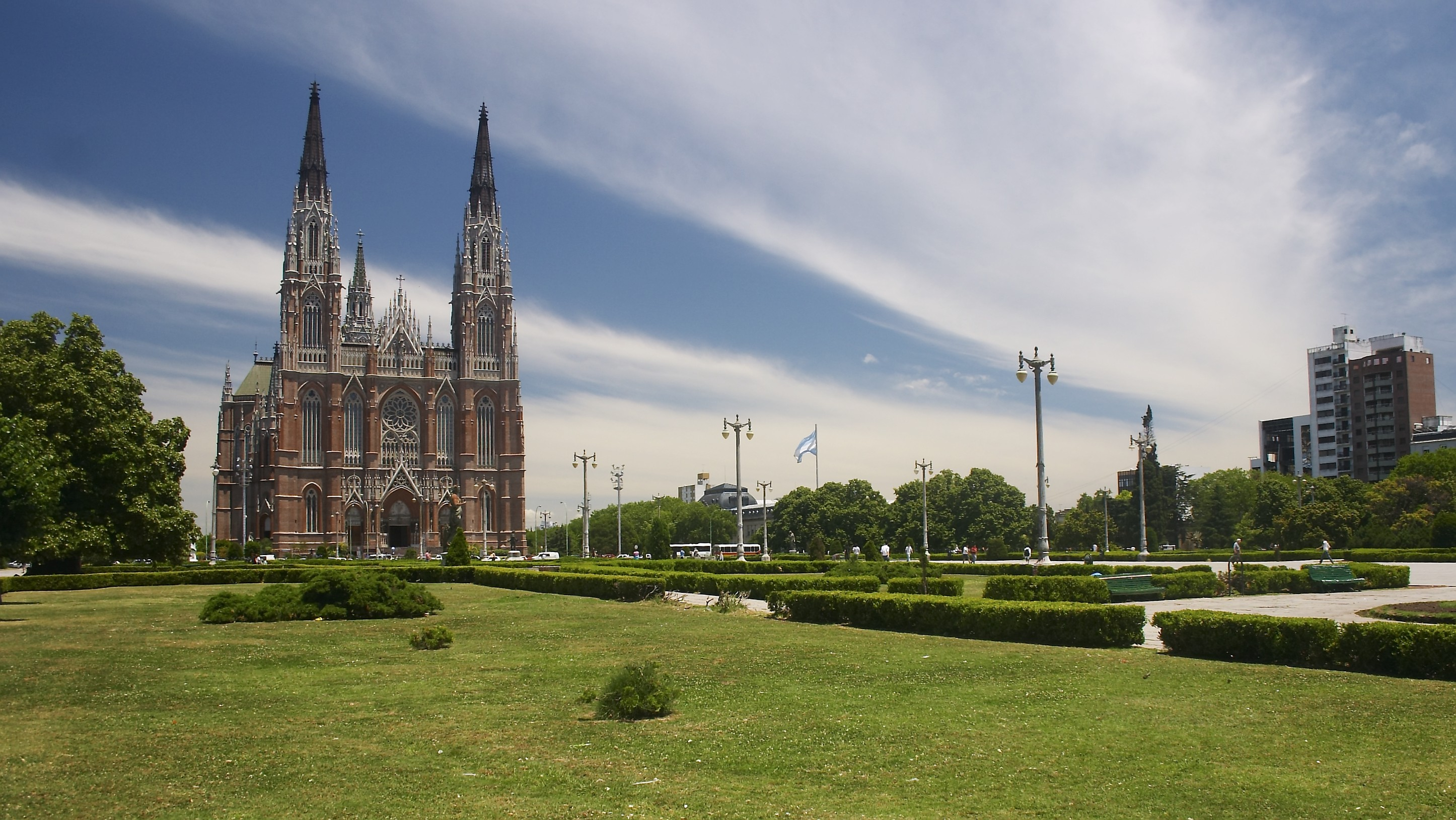
View of the Plaza Moreno and the cathedral.

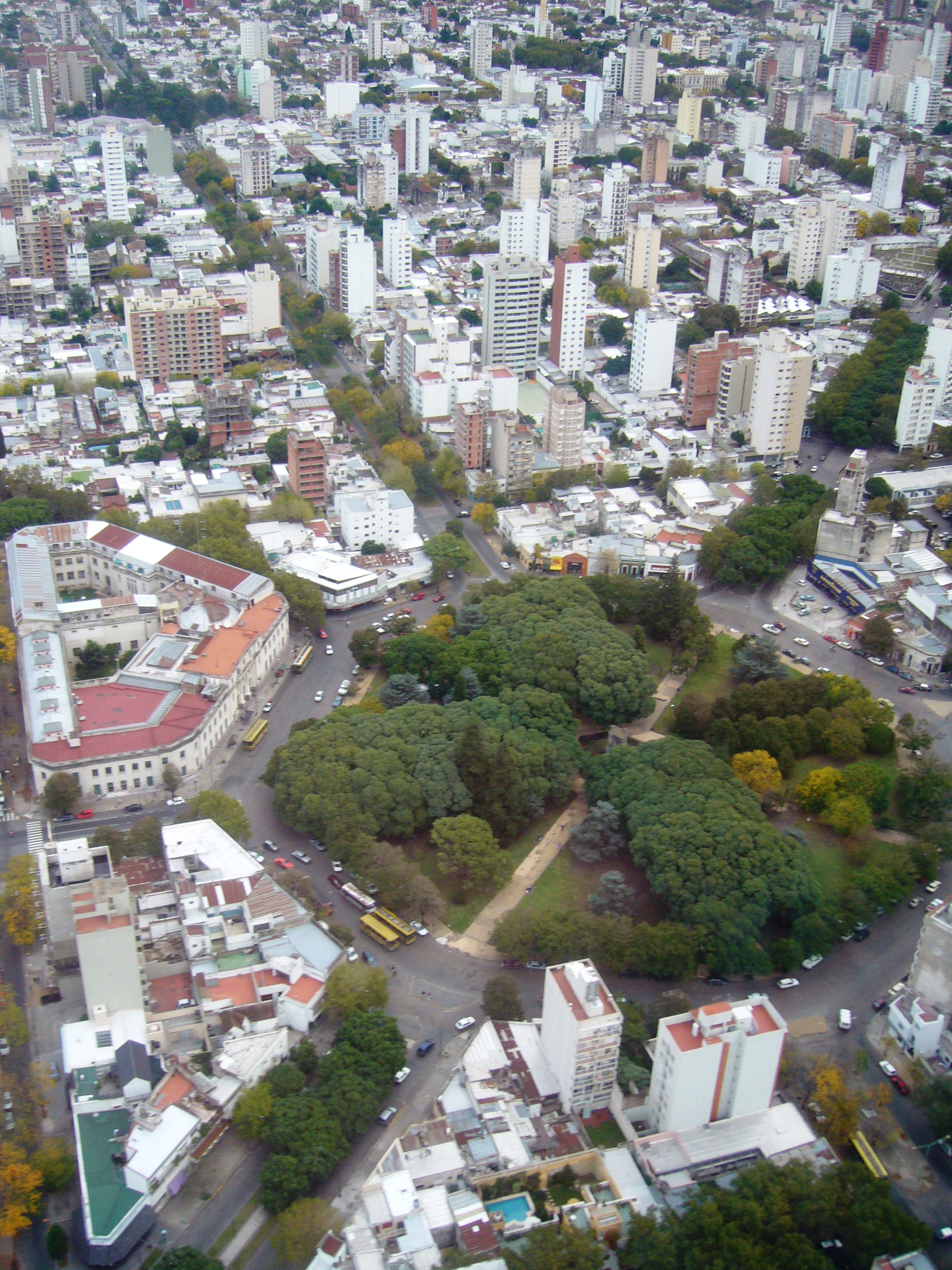
Plaza Dardo Rocha from the air.

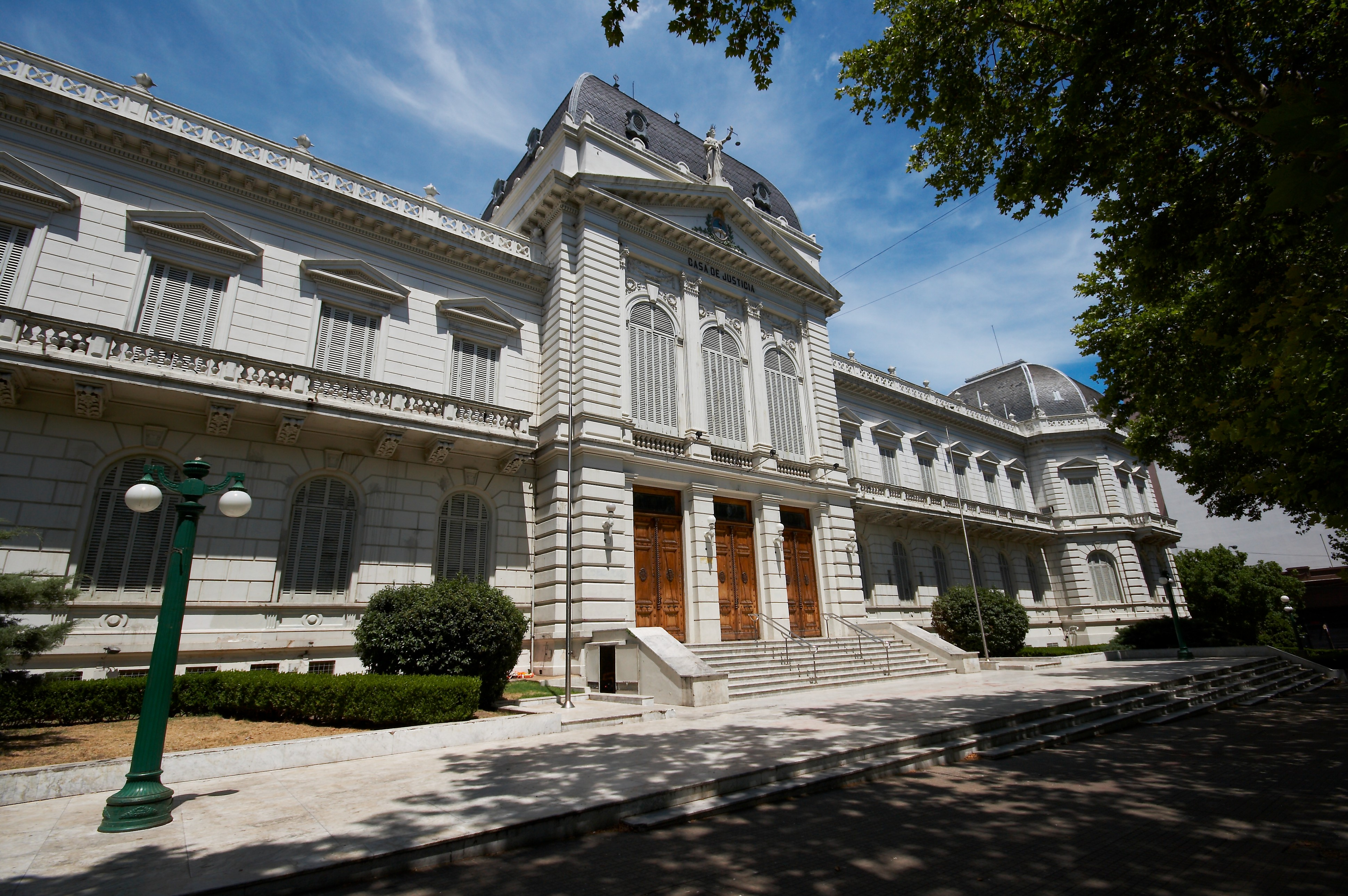
Courthouse.

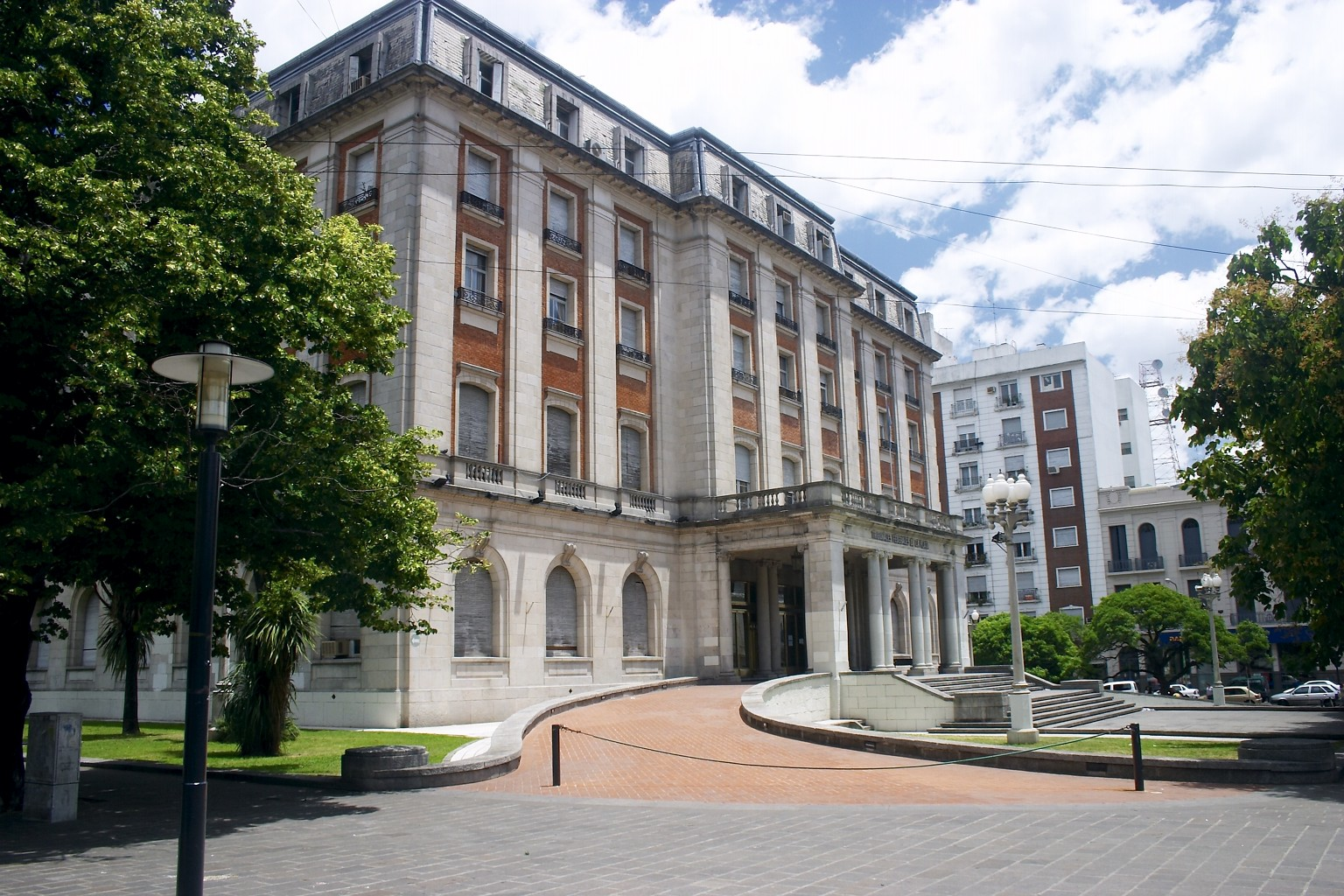
Juzgados Federales de La Plata (ex Hotel Provincial).

La Plata is a planned city, characterized by a strict grid of square blocks, with diagonal avenues running across. The two major diagonals, 73 and 74, go across the city from east to west and from north to south, respectively, and converge right in the city's center at Plaza Moreno. This square houses the so-called "foundation stone" and is the main square of the city. To its sides are located the City Hall and the cathedral of La Plata. Highlights of the city are the Museum of Natural Sciences, the building of the Interior, the Provincial Legislature, the new theater and the hippodrome. Many of these buildings were built at the time of the founding of the city, following an international call for proposals.

Another work is the parent company of Banco de la Provincia de Buenos Aires, located between the streets 6, 7, 46 and 47. This building was designed by architects Juan A. Buschiazzo and Luis Viglione. It opened on 19 April 1886, being amended in 1913 and in the 1970s.

It is a very green city, with its largest park being the "Paseo del Bosque" (or 'forest walk'). Twenty-two other parks and squares contain much of the city's trees and greenery. Other landmarks include the lake, the Martin Fierro amphitheater, the Parque Pereyra Iraola, the Zoo and Botanical Garden, the Victorian astronomical observatory, and the Natural History Museum. One notable attraction is the Children's Republic, which is said to have inspired Walt Disney to build Disneyland after he visited it during a trip to Argentina.

In 1977 the city lost one of its most valuable monuments to a fire: the Teatro Argentino de La Plata, predominantly built in a neoclassic style. After the fire, a new brutalist style theater was built in its place. The Estadio Ciudad de La Plata, a stadium influenced by modern high-tech architecture, is located in the city. It was planned and built after a national competition during the 1970s. The stadium received repairs and amendments in a subsequent project to expand its capacity, and also to rebuild the roof in sectors that had been destroyed by storms. The construction of a semitransparent deck of Kevlar and plastic resins was finished in January 2011.

La Plata has one commercial airport, Aeropuerto de La Plata, which is not served by any commercial airlines.

=== Awards received by the city ===
The city was awarded at the Exposition Universelle in Paris in 1889, an event in which the new city was awarded gold in the categories "City of the Future" and "Better performance built." At that event, Jules Verne gave the award to Dardo Rocha.

=== La Plata Cemetery ===
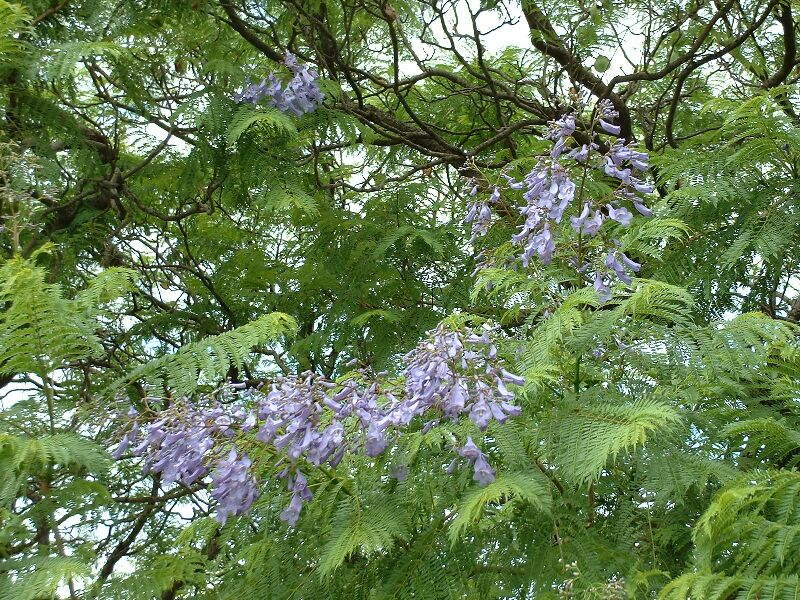
Jacaranda foliage and blossom

The municipal cemetery of La Plata was established in 1886 for the new capital of the province of Buenos Aires. It was designed by Pedro Benoit. It lies on the intersection of Avenue 31, 72 and diagonal 74 in the southern tip. It has some remarkable architectural features, both in its main entrance and in many of the family vaults, including neoclassical, Neo-Gothic, Art Nouveau (in its variant of Catalan Art Nouveau), Art Deco and Egyptian revival styles. The main entrance is an impressive neo-classical portico with Doric columns. The Catholic chapel, in Romanesque revival style, was finished in 1950. Diagonal 74 begins at the Río de la Plata and ends at the cemetery, causing some to remark that Benoit's layout may intentionally symbolize the cycle of life and death.

Its annex, the Jewish Cemetery, belongs to the Asociación Mutual Israelita Argentina in La Plata and is located on Avenue 72.

== Sports ==
The main football teams in the city are Estudiantes de La Plata (locally known as "pinchas"), winners of the Intercontinental Cup in 1968, and Gimnasia y Esgrima La Plata, both of which currently play in the Argentina's first division. Estudiantes is the sole team within the city to win a national or international title. La Plata has Liga Amateur Platense de fútbol that encompasses various clubs in the region, such as Club Atlético Estrella de Berisso, La Plata FC, Asociación Nueva Alianza, and Club Everton.

Basketball has a place in the Torneo Nacional de Ascenso (National Ascent Tournament), through Gimnasia y Esgrima La Plata. In addition, through the Asociación Platense de Basquetbol, La Plata has leagues and tournaments for all levels and categories, including Gimnasia y Esgrima La Plata, Estudiantes, Centro Fomento de Los Hornos Club Atenas, Unión Vecinal, Centro de Fomento Meridiano V, and Club Cultural y Deportivo Juventud.

Map of the Autódromo Roberto José Mouras track

Auto racing also has its importance in the city in the form of the Turismo Carretera. There is also a race track named Autódromo Roberto José Mouras in honor of the historic Chevrolet driver died in Lobos in 1992. Gastón Mazzacane is from the city as well. After 21 races in Formula 1, he also competed in the Champ Car and Top Race V6 series.

The 1970 Artistic Billiards World Championship were held in La Plata.

In recent years, La Plata has emerged as a regional hub for action sports and urban disciplines. The city hosts Dancing Shoes Latinoamérica, the most prominent longboard dancing and freestyle competition in Latin America, which draws international athletes to the region. This sporting culture is supported by a local technical manufacturing industry, notably Manija Boards, a company specializing in high-performance hardware. In 2026, the city's influence in the sport was recognized globally when this local firm was appointed as an official sponsor and jury member for the So... Longboard Dancing World Cup in the Netherlands.

== Culture ==
Culture has a major role in the city of La Plata. This is reflected in the large amount of cultural centers, theaters, museums, cinemas, and libraries that are in the city, as well as the Universidad Nacional de La Plata and the observatory.

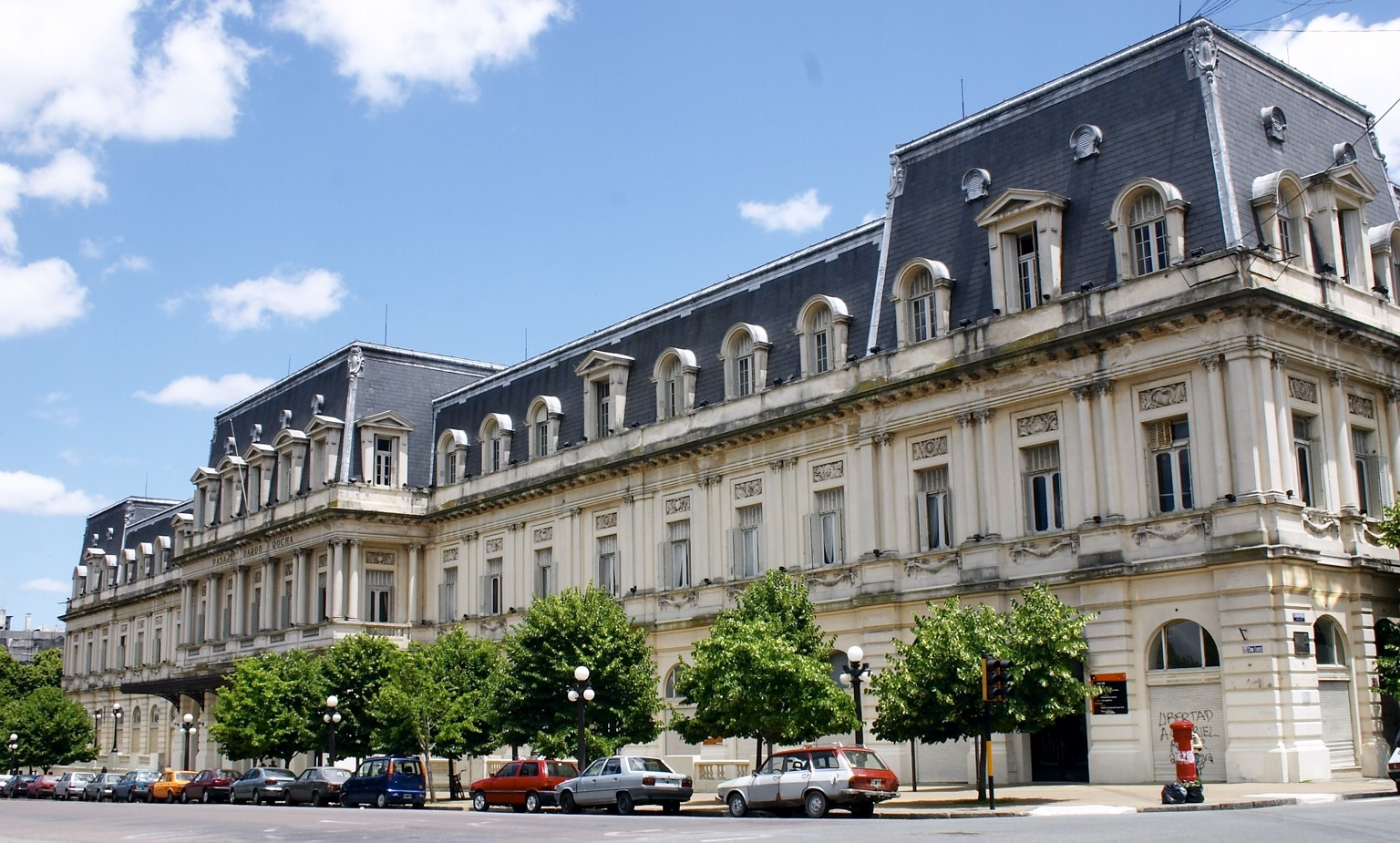
Pasaje Dardo Rocha Building, named in honor of the city's founder.

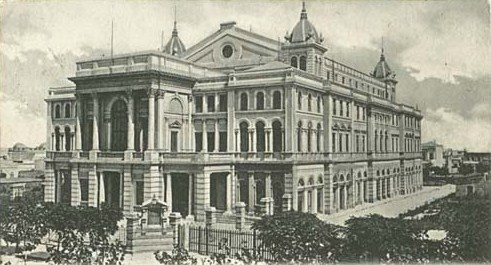
Former building of the Teatro Argentino (burnt and demolished in 1977).

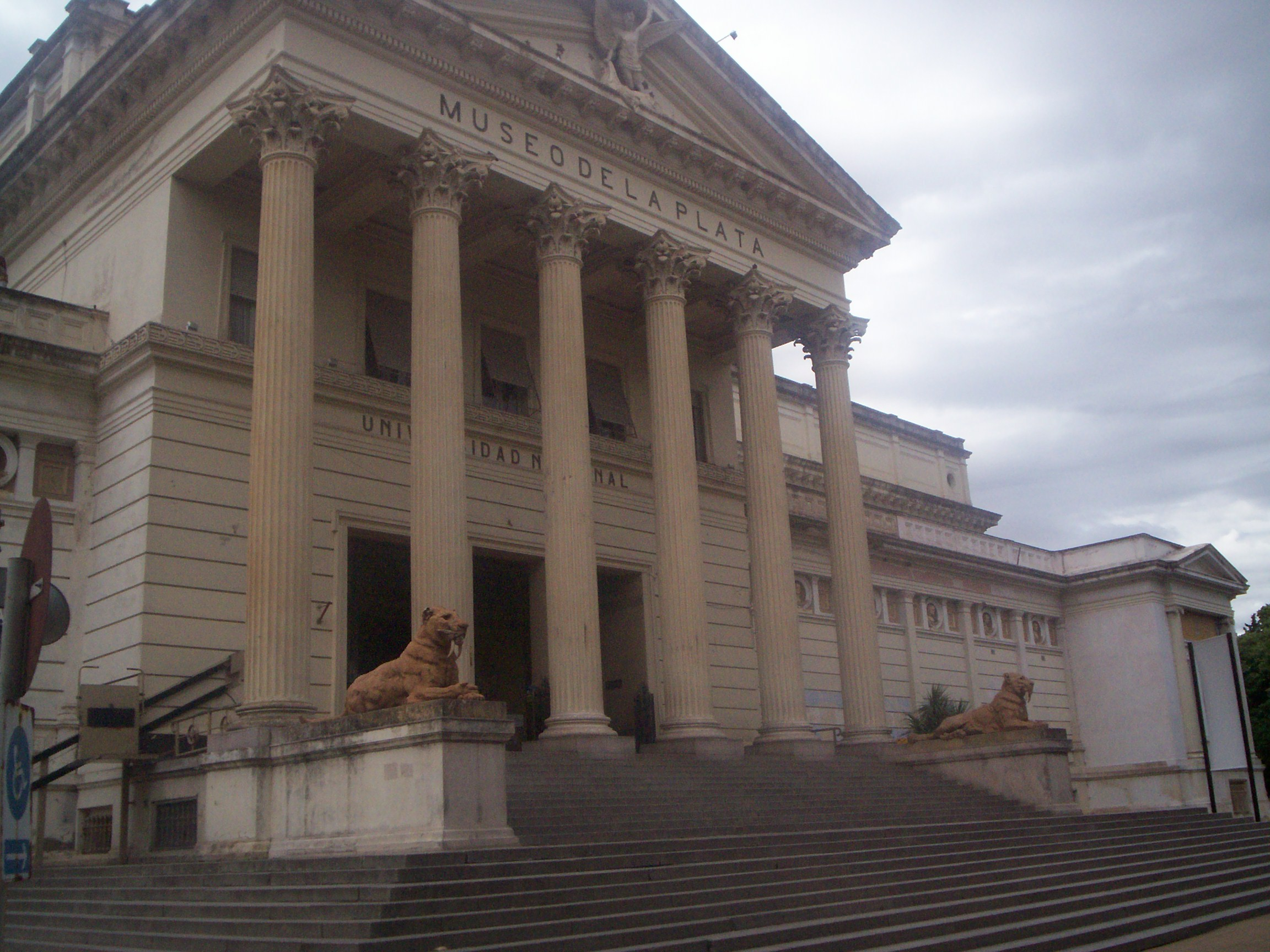
La Plata Museum of Natural History.

- Cultural centers: Centro Cultural Pasaje Dardo Rocha, Centro Cultural Islas Malvinas, Centro Cultural Estación Provincial, Centro Cultural Viejo Almacén El Obrero, Centro de Cultura & Comunicación, Centro Cultural El Núcleo, Centro Actividades Artísticas CRISOLES, Centro Cultural Los Hornos, Centro Cultural y Social El Galpón de Tolosa.
- Theaters: Teatro Argentino de La Plata, Teatro Municipal Coliseo Podestá, Anfiteatro Martín Fierro, Teatro La Nonna, Teatro La Hermandad del Princesa, Sala 420, Taller de Teatro de la UNLP, Complejo El Teatro, Teatro La Lechuza.
- Museums: Museo de Ciencias Naturales, Museo de Arte Contemporáneo Latinoamericano, Museo Provincial de Bellas Artes, Museo Municipal de Bellas Artes, Museo de Arte Fra. Angélico, Museo de Instrumentos Musicales Colección Dr. Emilio Azzarini, Museo Histórico del Fuerte de la Ensenada de Barragán, Museo y Archivo Dardo Rocha, Museo Almafuerte, Museo del Teatro Argentino, Museo José Juan Podestá, Museo de la Catedral, Museo Indigenista Yana Kúntur, Museo Internacional de Muñecos, Museo del Automóvil Colección Rau, Museo del Tango Platense, Museo Policial Inspector Mayor Vesiroglos, Museo Histórico Contralmirante Chalier (Escuela Naval de Río Santiago), Museo Histórico Militar Tte. Julio A. Roca, Museo de Anatomía Veterinaria Dr. Víctor M. Arroyo, Museo de Artesanía Tradicional Juan Alfonso Carrizo, Museo de Astronomía y Geofísica, Museo de Botánica y Farmacognosia Dr. Carlos Spegazzini, Museo y Casa de Descanso Samay Huasi, Museo de Física, Museo de Historia de la Medicina Dr. Santiago Gorostiague, Museo Biblioteca de Química y Farmacia Prof. Dr. Carlos Sagastume, Museo de Odontología, Museo de Ciencias Agrarias y Forestales Prof. Julio Ocampo.
- Libraries: Biblioteca Central General José de San Martín, Biblioteca Municipal Francisco López Merino, Biblioteca de la Universidad Nacional de La Plata, Biblioteca de la Legislatura de la Provincia.
- Cinemas: Cinema San Martín, Cinema 8, Cinema City, Cinema Paradiso, Cinema Rocha, Cine Select, Espacio INCAA km. 60.

There were big personalities in the cultural sphere from the city: Paula Almerares (opera singer, soprano); Dante Anzolini (conductor); Efraín U. Bischoff (historian), José Walter Gavito (sculptor), Osvaldo Golijov (classical composer), Robert Noble (journalist and socialist politician, founder and first editor of the newspaper Clarín), Emilio Pettoruti (painter), María Dhialma Tiberti (writer), Iñaki Urlezaga (classical dancer), Álvaro Yunque (writer), Jorge and Federico D'Elia (actors); Adabel Guerrero (dancer, actress), Alejo García Pintos (film and television actor), Benjamín Rojas (actor and musician), Héctor Bidonde (actor) among others.

The city has a great attraction to music, whereas all festival concerts are organized. In addition, this is formed big band music and folklore of Argentina such as Los Redondos, Virus, Guasones, Opus Cuatro, Infonoise, among others.

=== Festivals, celebrations and events scheduled ===
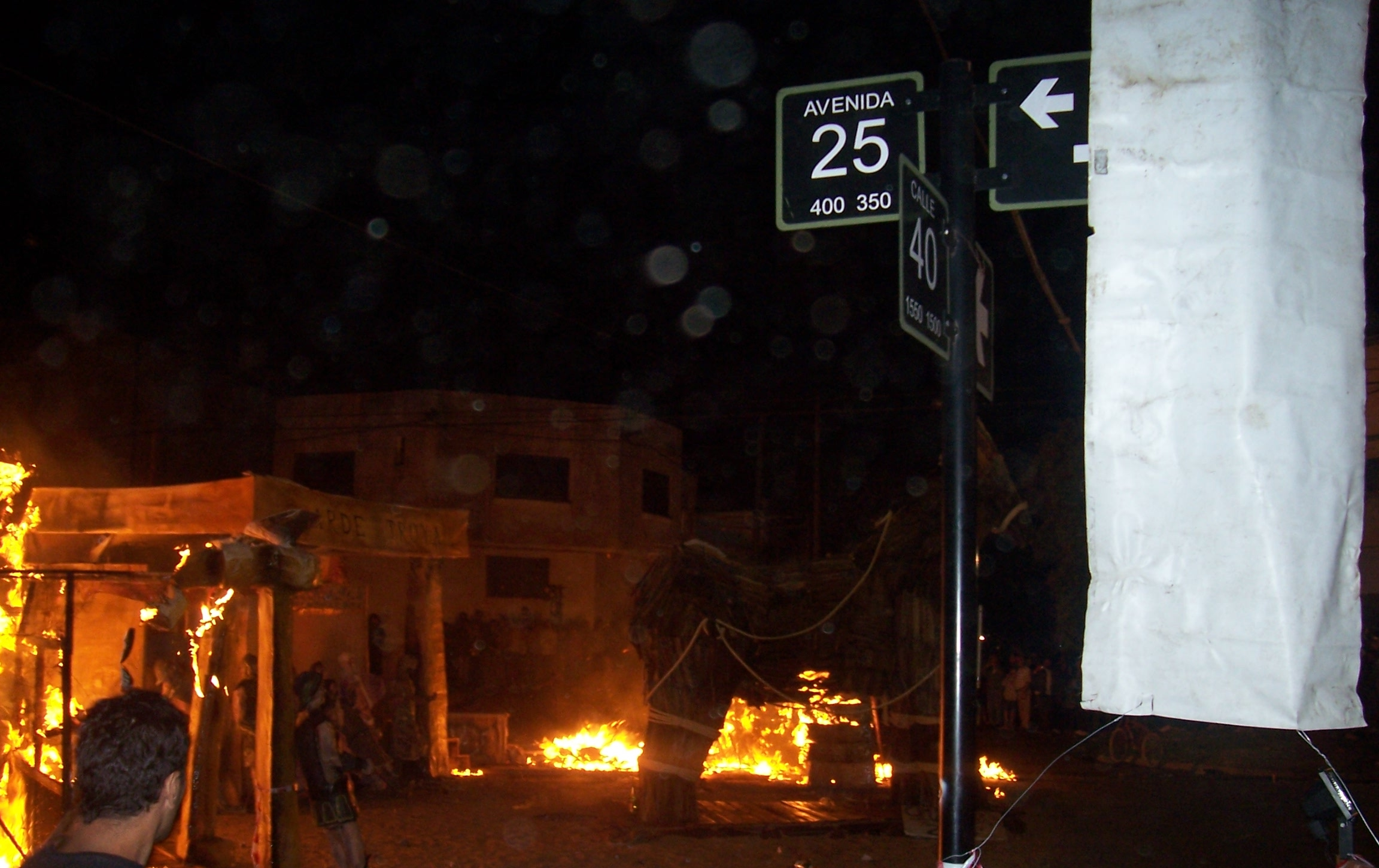
Doll winner 2008, "Arde Troya".

The city of La Plata has the particularity of being the only place (with Berisso and Ensenada) in the country where the burning of Momos (Dolls similar to those cremated at the Fallas festival in Valencia, Spain) is held every New Year's Eve. Hundreds of dolls are burnt to celebrate the end of the year and the beginning of a new year. Competitions for the best doll are awarded by the La Plata municipality and media.

Every 18 April is International Day For Monuments and Sites. That day, buses with tour guides leave from the Centro Cultural Pasaje Dardo Rocha to the various historical monuments of La Plata, Berisso and Ensenada, being the activity free.

In addition, every year on 19 November, the anniversary of the city is held with recitals and a fireworks show at the Plaza Moreno.

In La Plata, as well as in all of Argentina, the first day of spring is celebrated along with National Student's Day on 21 September. On this date, the municipality organizes concerts both in the Paseo del Bosque and Plaza Moreno.

=== Patron saint ===
The patron saint of the city and the party of La Plata is Saint Ponciano, the 18th pope of the Catholic Church, who died in Sardinia on 19 November 235. On 19 November is the feast of the Catholic parish of St. Pontian, pope and martyr.

== Tourism ==
The most important tourist sites are located in the heart of the city's founding, between Streets 51 and 53, being the center of the city's Plaza Moreno. The square separates two great works of the city: the Metropolitan Cathedral of La Plata "Immaculate Conception" and the Palacio Municipal.

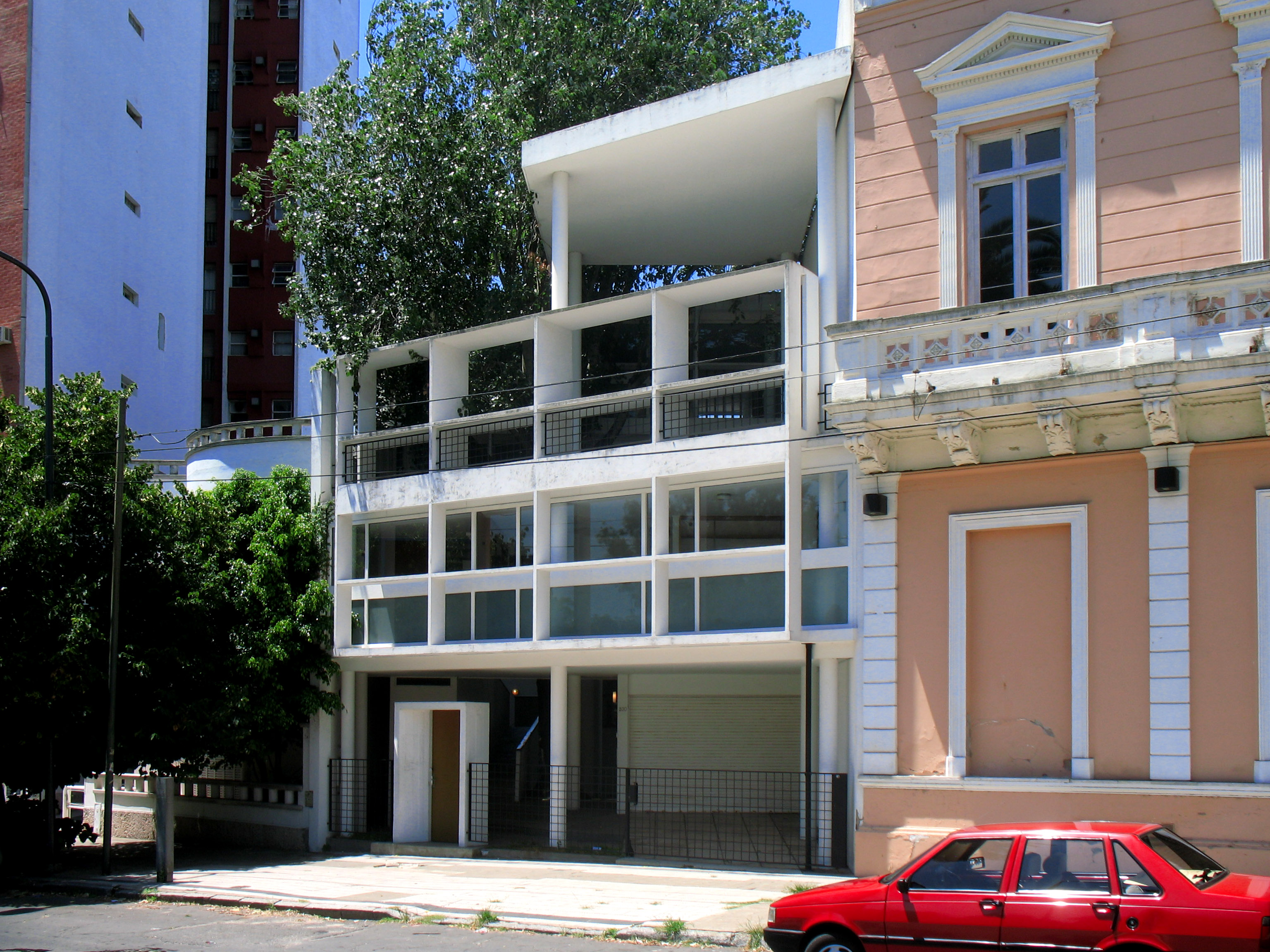
Curutchet House, World Heritage Site in La Plata

The city of La Plata has many monuments and historical sites. Among them are: the Banco Provincia de Buenos Aires headquarters, the Curutchet House, Casa de Gobierno Provincial, Casa Mariani – Teruggi, Centro Cultural Islas Malvinas, Centro Cultural Meridiano V, Centro Cultural Pasaje Dardo Rocha, Iglesia San Benjamín, la Legislatura Provincial, Museo de Ciencias Naturales, the Quinta Oreste Santospago, the Rectorado de la UNLP, Museo Ferroviario of Tolosa, the Teatro Municipal Coliseo Podestá, the Anfiteatro Martín Fierro, the Estadio Ciudad de La Plata, entre otros.

Moreover, staying at the city of La Plata the visitors can tour the monuments of the neighboring cities of Berisso and Ensenada, finding among these to the Street New York, the Swift Refrigerator, Ukrainian Catholic Parish Our Lady of the Assumption, Old Station Cultural Centre, Fort Barragán and Historical Museum, the Ensenada Rotary Bridge, among others.

Quema de muñecos is a traditional celebration held every New Year. People from different parts of the city build giant figures, usually modeled after famous fictional characters, using wood and papier mâché, and stuff them with fireworks. After midnight, all the figures are burnt, igniting the firework-filling in the process, resulting in a fiery spectacle. For safety reasons, most figures are built in the same spot where they are planned to be burnt, which usually involves a large clearing in a plaza, wide median strips, or abandoned lots. After the celebration, residents vote for the best figure in terms of design, size, etc., and the most voted gets a prize from a panel of established figure builders, as well as cash money reward.

== Notable people ==
Category:People from La Plata

- Julio Velasco
- Mauro Colagreco, Argentine chef
- Irene Bernasconi, Antarctic researcher
- Facundo Cabral
- Ángel Cabrera
- Agustín Creevy
- René Favaloro
- Sergio Karakachoff
- Cristina Fernández de Kirchner
- Federico Sturzenegger
- Mercedes Lambre
- Salvadora Medina Onrubia (1894–1972), writer, poet, anarchist, feminist
- Martín Palermo
- Emilio Pettoruti
- Florentino Ameghino
- Benjamín Rojas
- Marcos Rojo (born 1990), footballer
- Guillermo Barros Schelotto
- Gustavo Barros Schelotto
- Santiago Sosa (born 1999), footballer for Atlanta United
- Roberto Themis Speroni (1922–1967), writer
- Nicolás Tauber (born 1980), Argentine-Israeli footballer
- Joaquín Tuculet
- Iñaki Urlezaga
- Francisco Varallo
- Jorge Washington Ábalos
- Juan Sebastián Verón (born 1975), footballer
- Sergio Parisse, rugby union player

== Sister cities ==
- Brazil, Porto Alegre, 1982
- Italy, Bologna, 1988
- Israel, Beersheba, 1989
- Spain, Zaragoza, 1990
- Paraguay, Asunción, 1993
- Chile, Concepción, 1993
- Venezuela, Barquisimeto, 2012
- United States, Louisville, 1994
- Uruguay, Maldonado, 1994
- Uruguay, Montevideo, 1994
- Bolivia, Santa Cruz de la Sierra, 1994
- Bolivia, Sucre, 1994
- Italy, Anghiari, 1998
- France, Boulogne-sur-Mer, 2000
- United Kingdom, Liverpool, 2005
- Venezuela, Santa Ana de Coro, 2007
- China, Jiujiang, 2008
- Mexico, Toluca, 2010
- Italy, Bivongi, 2012
- Argentina, Mar del Plata, 2012
- Australia, Baw Baw

== Notable companies ==
Among the companies with headquarters, origins, or significant operations in La Plata are:

- Banco de la Provincia de Buenos Aires, the provincial public bank, whose Casa Matriz in La Plata was inaugurated in 1886.
- Federación Patronal Seguros, an insurance group founded in La Plata in 1923 by local businesspeople.
- Rivadavia Seguros, an insurance company whose Casa Central is located in La Plata.
- ABSA (Aguas Bonaerenses S.A.), a water and sanitation operator whose service area covers numerous localities in Buenos Aires Province.
- EDELAP, the electricity distributor for La Plata and surrounding districts such as Berisso, Ensenada, Brandsen and Punta Indio.
- El Día, a daily newspaper founded in 1884 and published in La Plata.
- Diario Hoy, a newspaper launched in La Plata in 1993.
- Makenhaus, a real-estate developer focused on residential projects in La Plata, City Bell, Manuel B. Gonnet, Buenos Aires Province, Buenos Aires, and Florida, United States.
- Red 92, a radio and digital news outlet based in La Plata.
- Nini Mayorista, a wholesale retailer that began in La Plata in 1969 and later expanded its operations.
- Molino Campodónico, a flour-milling company whose history dates back to 1888.
- Cerámica Ctibor, a construction-materials manufacturer with a long industrial presence in the La Plata region.
- Conteplat, a packaging manufacturer based in the La Plata industrial park and dedicated to PET preforms.
- Snoop Consulting, a software company that opened a development center in La Plata and is part of the local technology cluster.
- Gisens Biotech, a biotechnology startup from La Plata linked to research carried out with participation from the National University of La Plata and CONICET.

== See also ==
- List of twin towns and sister cities in Argentina
- Plaza Moreno
