= La Plata Airport =

Airport in Argentina

La Plata Airport Aeropuerto de La Plata
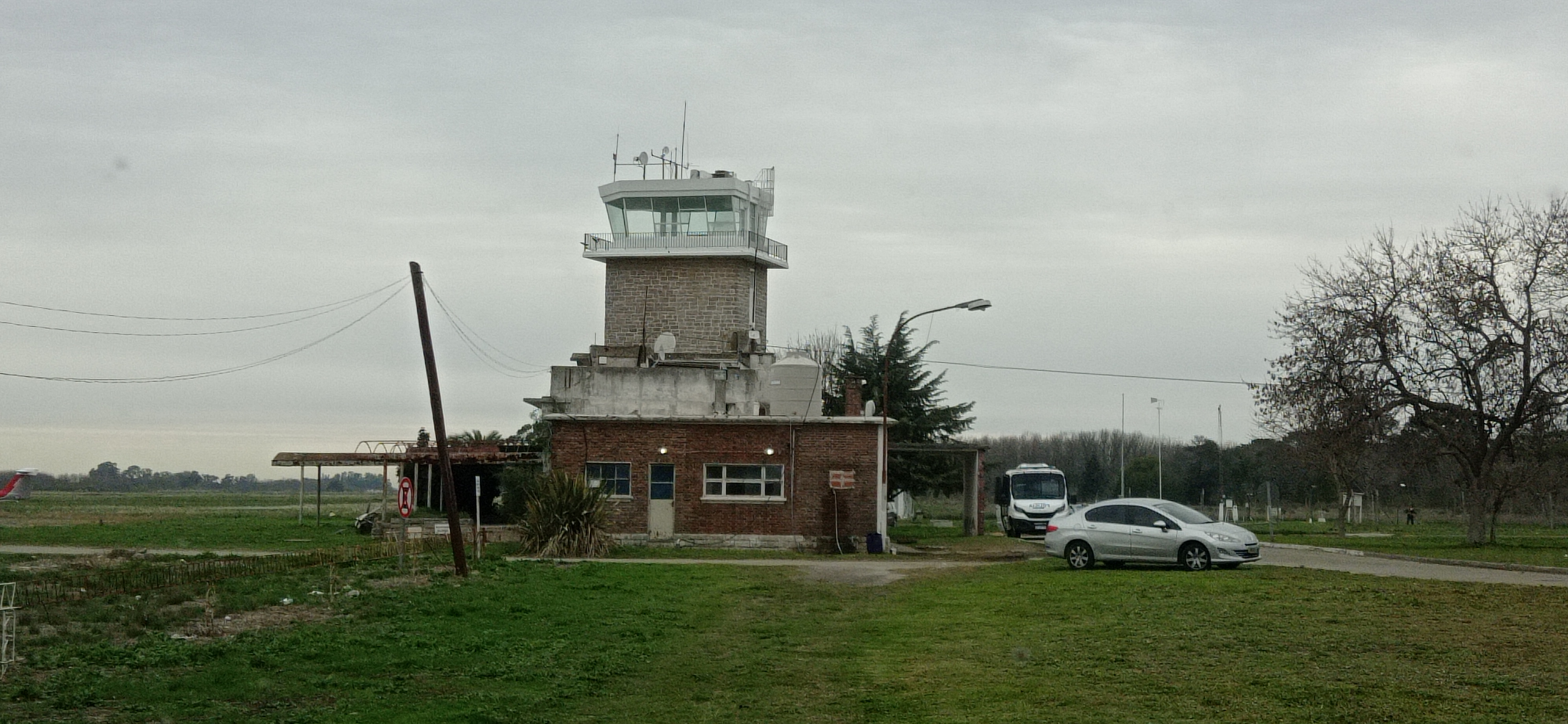
- Control tower of the airport in June 2023
- IATA: LPG; ICAO: SADL

Summary
- Airport type: Public
- Owner: DPAO
- Serves: La Plata, Argentina
- Elevation AMSL: 72 ft / 22 m
- Coordinates: 34°58′10″S 57°53′35″W

Map
- Location of the airport in Argentina

Runways
Direction	Length		Surface
Direction	m	ft	Surface
02/20	1,260	4,134	Asphalt
- Sources: WAD Google Maps SkyVector

La Plata Airport (Spanish: Aeropuerto de La Plata) (IATA: LPG, ICAO: SADL) is a small airport serving La Plata, the capital city of the Buenos Aires Province, Argentina. The airport is 5 kilometres (3 mi) southeast of the centre of the city, and has a 60-square-metre (650 sq ft) terminal.

The former Runway 14/32 is closed. 1,235 metres (4,052 ft) of the southern end of Runway 02/20 is closed, leaving a marked runway length of 1,260 metres (4,130 ft), with 320 metres (1,050 ft) of paved overrun available on the north end.

The La Plata VOR and non-directional beacon (Idents: PTA) are located on the field.

As of 2023 no commercial flights fly into LPG. The nearest commercially serviced airport is Ministro Pistarini International Airport in Buenos Aires.

== See also ==
- Transport in Argentina
- List of airports in Argentina
