= Makenhaus =

Argentine real estate development company

- Industry: Real estate development
- Area served: La Plata, City Bell, Manuel B. Gonnet, CABA, Buenos Aires Province, Buenos Aires, Florida, United States
- Products: Residential apartment buildings and multi-family housing complexes
- Brands: Up! "Creamos Hogares"
- Website: makenhaus.com.ar

Makenhaus is an Argentine real estate development company focused on residential projects in La Plata, City Bell, Manuel B. Gonnet, Buenos Aires Province, Buenos Aires, and Florida, United States. Its work includes apartment buildings and multi-family housing developments, including mid-rise urban projects and smaller residential complexes.

== Projects and development approach ==
Coverage of Makenhaus's work has described two recurring formats in its output: contemporary vertical residential developments in central urban locations, and smaller-scale housing complexes with a more individualized architectural approach. Projects associated with the company include Nero, Edificio Dos (marketed as Up!2), Edificio Plaza Güemes, Up! Cantilo, and Up!39.

== Architectural profile ==
Specialized coverage has identified recurring design features in the company's residential projects in La Plata, including semi-covered balconies, an emphasis on outward views, and the placement of shared social spaces at roof level. In those accounts, these elements are presented as part of a residential model that seeks to connect everyday domestic life with the surrounding urban and landscaped environment.

== Urban context ==
Several academic studies on Greater La Plata provide context for the urban areas in which Makenhaus has developed projects, discussing residential expansion in peri-urban areas, the hierarchization of residential sectors in La Plata, and the wider urban-regional configuration of the metropolitan area. Within La Plata itself, its projects have been presented as part of residential corridors and already consolidated sectors of the city's urban fabric.

=== Representative projects ===
Projects such as Nero, Edificio Plaza Güemes, and Up! Cantilo illustrate several recurring features of the firm's output. Nero was described in architectural coverage as emphasizing the functional organization of units, environmental conditioning, and the relationship between interior and exterior space through semi-covered galleries. Edificio Plaza Güemes was presented as a response to a consolidated urban lot and to the visual relationship between the building and the adjacent public space. Up! Cantilo adapted similar criteria to a lower-scale residential complex associated with the urban fabric of City Bell and nearby green areas.

== Media coverage ==
From 2017 to 2024, Makenhaus and several of its projects were the subject of repeated feature coverage in the Argentine architecture and design magazine Espacio & Confort. That coverage focused in particular on the design language and residential program of projects such as Nero, Edificio Plaza Güemes, Up! Cantilo, and Up!39.
