= Walter Gavito =

Argentine sculptor of international fame (born 1935)

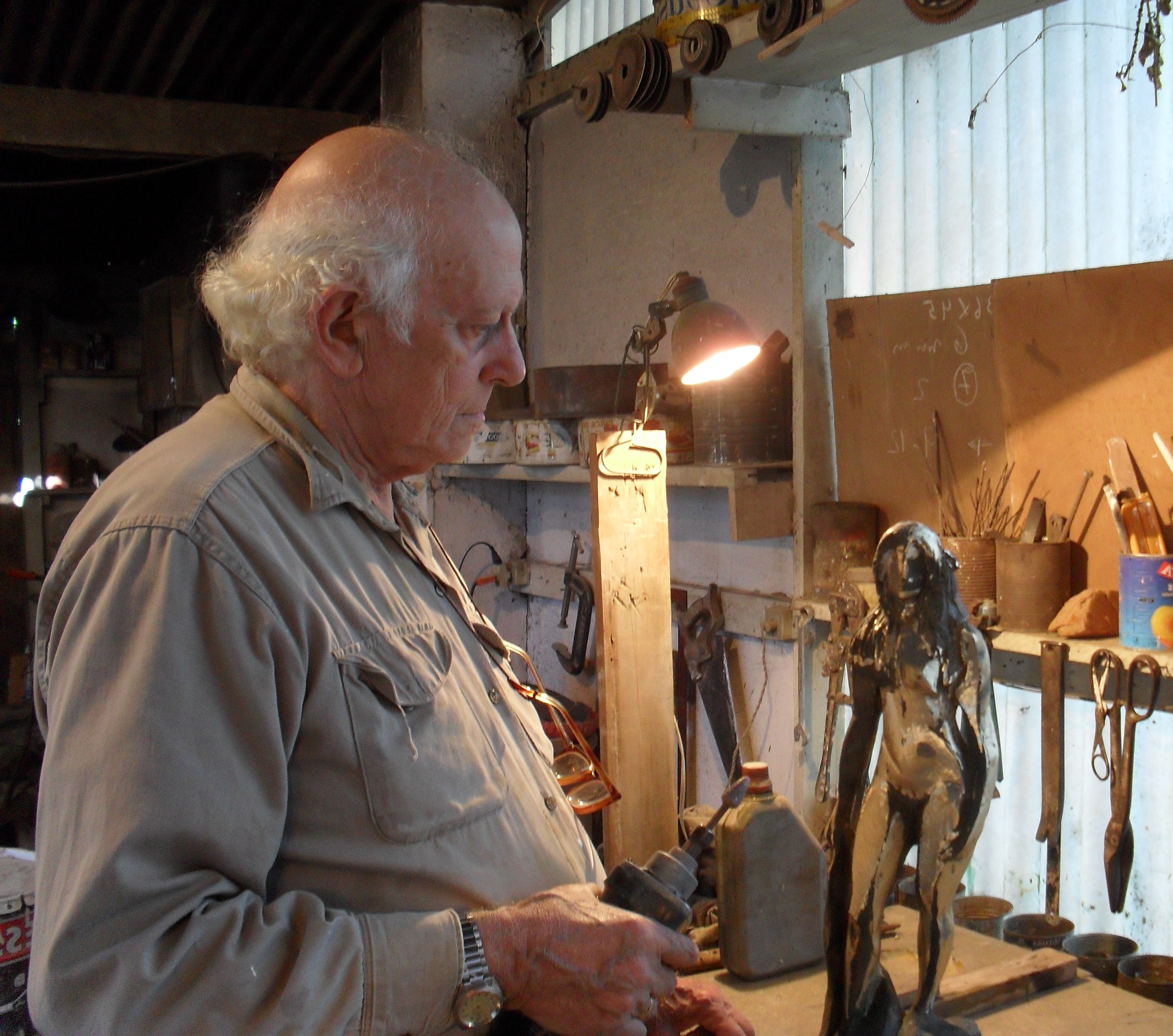
Walter Gavito

José Walter Gavito (La Plata, January 4, 1935 - Buenos Aires, June 8, 2017) was an Argentine sculptor known for his work in contemporary sculpture. His work spans a variety of styles and techniques, primarily exploring the human figure and its relationship with space. Many of his pieces were cast in bronze, a material that Gavito mastered and personally used in the casting process, allowing him to maintain full control over the realization of his sculptures.

The influence of cubism is evident in many of his works, where geometric shapes and fragmented perspectives combine to represent the human figure. In particular, many of his sculptures explore the female nude, approached with a perspective that merges the abstract and the figurative.

Throughout his career, Gavito actively participated in significant institutions and artistic spaces in Italy, such as the Galleria d'Arte Sacra dei Contemporanei di Milano (Villa Clerici) and the Museo Pagani Arte Moderna e Contemporanea (Castellanza). His connection with renowned Italian artists such as Enrico Manfrini, Lello Scorzelli, and Francesco Messina marked a significant part of his international trajectory. His work, which earned him numerous awards both nationally and internationally, can be found in public and private collections in Argentina, Uruguay, Italy, Greece, and other countries, establishing him as one of the most prominent figures in Argentine sculpture.
