= Roberto Themis Speroni =

Argentine writer

Roberto Themis Speroni (1922, La Plata –1967) was an Argentine writer.
