= Victor Mela Danzaria =

Nigerian politician

Victor Mela Danzaria (born 1973) is a politician in the Billiri Local Government Area of Gombe State. He is a member of House of Representatives in Nigeria, representing the Balanga-Billiri Federal constituency in Gombe State and Vice Chairman of Solid Minerals Committee.

He was an active member and Executive of the Nigerian-Canadian Association of Saskatchewan (NCAs) since its inception in 2016.

He contested under All Progressives Congress party in February 2019 and polled 45,112 votes to defeat a serving member, Ali Isa, who scored 35,395 at the National Assembly elections.

He received a master's degree in Geology from University of Jos, Plateau State.
