= José María Mainetti =

José María Mainetti (March 5, 1909 – February 9, 2006) was an Argentine physician, surgeon and oncologist.

Mainetti was born in Hinojo, Buenos Aires. He spent most of his childhood and youth in La Plata, were his family moved in 1911. He finished his medicine studies in 1932. Since 1940 he started working also as a professor at the Universidad Nacional de La Plata.

In 1969 he created the Fundación para el Progreso ("Foundation for Progress") which later became Fundación Dr. José María Mainetti, and in 1971 the Escuela de Oncología (Oncology School). In 1986 he started the Centro Oncológico de Excelencia teaching, research, diagnosis and attention centre against cancer, and in 1993 the Instituto de Trasplante de Médula Osea (Bone Marrow Transplant Institute)

Mainetti is well known in Argentina as the mentor of René Favaloro, and a pioneer of bioethics in the country. As well as Favaloro, he had to struggle against the lack of financial support.

José María Mainetti died in 2006 in Manuel Gonnet, Buenos Aires.
