= Sergio Karakachoff =

Argentine journalist and politician

Sergio Karakachoff (June 27, 1939 - September 10, 1976) was an Argentinian journalist, human rights lawyer and politician. He was abducted, tortured and murdered for his opposition to the military dictatorship in Argentina (1976–1983).

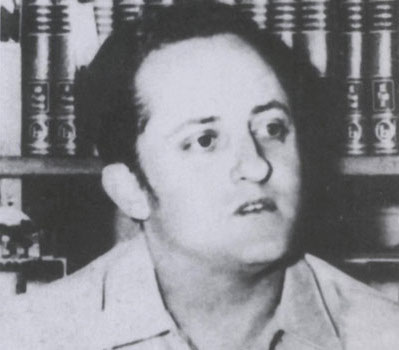
Sergio Karakachoff

== Biography ==
Karakachoff was born in La Plata, in the Province of Buenos Aires, Argentina. He attended the Rafael Hernandez National School where he founded the students union and whose library now carries his name. He went on to study at the National University of La Plata (UNLP) where he organized a student group adhering to the principles of university reform that was a precursor of the "Purple Strip" organisation. In 1963 and 1964, he was Secretary of the Legislative Council of the Municipality of La Plata. In 1965, he became a lawyer dedicated to labor law.

After the installation of the military dictatorship called the Argentine Revolution, Karakachoff clearly broke with conservative ideas that held the ideas of Ricardo Balbín (so-called balbinismo) within radicalism, creating the MAP (Movement of Popular Affirmation), related to the socialist group MAP (Argentine Popular Action Movement) which was simultaneously founded by Guillermo Estévez Boero. The group would be the basis of the daily paper and political organ "En Lucha", (Infight) to which Federico Storani was also associated where he wrote opinion pieces that profoundly influenced the generation of '70 highlighting the dependent structure of Argentina and the need for new strategies and policies to drive change through non-violent and democratic means.

Karakachoff had been a member of the Unión Civica Radical since he was young and in 1968 was a member of the National Coordinating Board and the Movement for Renewal and Change in 1972/1973, led by Raúl Alfonsín. In 1972, at the UCR National Convention he was one of the drafters of the Electoral Platform of UCR 1972, of advanced socio-democratic inspiration together with German Lopez, Roque Carranza, Bernardo Grinspun and others. In 1973 he ran for National Deputy. In 1975, he proposed the need to fundamentally reform the UCR to transform it into a political party deeply rooted in the working class. In 1975, he joined the Permanent Assembly for Human Rights (APDH) where he became involved presenting hundreds of writs of habeas corpus on behalf of the detained and disappeared, that ran into thousands, from the actions of the 1976 military coup.

On September 10, 1976, Sergio Karakachoff was kidnapped by a paramilitary group along with his friend and partner, Domingo Teruggi. Their tortured bodies appeared on September 11, on the roadside in an area called Magdalena on the outskirts of the city of La Plata. Days earlier he had denounced the violence of the military junta in an article titled "Acerca de la violencia" ("About Violence").

== Memorial ==
The library of the Rafael Hernández National College in the city of La Plata bears his name.
