= Sudden unexplained death in childhood =

- Specialty: Pediatrics
- Symptoms: Usually none but may be preceded by a fever
- Complications: Death
- Usual onset: Sudden
- Duration: Unknown
- Types: Unknown
- Causes: Not definitive, most likely heart arrhythmias, seizures, or a mix
- Risk factors: Family history of sudden death
- Diagnostic method: Unexplained death of a child of 1–18 years
- Prevention: None
- Treatment: None
- Medication: None
- Prognosis: Death
- Frequency: ~1.2 out of 100,000
- Deaths: ~1.2 out of 100,000

Sudden unexplained death in childhood (SUDC) is the death of a child over the age of 12 months which remains unexplained after a thorough investigation and autopsy. There has not been enough research to identify risk factors, common characteristics, or prevention strategies for SUDC.

SUDC is similar in concept to sudden infant death syndrome (SIDS). Like SIDS, SUDC is a diagnosis of exclusion, the concrete symptom of both being death. However, SIDS is a diagnosis specifically for infants under the age of 12 months while SUDC is a diagnosis for children 12 months and older. The causes of SIDS and SUDC are not definitively known but there are good chances heart arrhythmias and seizures are the main causes. Although it can happen to any child under the age of 18 years (after which the deaths are classified as sudden arrhythmic death syndrome), it is most common in those aged between 1–4 years, where, according to the SUDC foundation, it is the 5th leading cause of death in this age group.

== Hypotheses ==
Researchers are exploring a possible connection between sudden unexplained death in toddlers, febrile seizures, and hippocampal anomalies. The occurrence of fever before the sudden deaths later in sleep, could explain the febrile seizure hypotheses

== Epidemiology ==
SUDC is rare, with a reported incidence in the United States of 1.2 deaths per 100,000 children, compared to 54 deaths per 100,000 live births for SIDS. There are approximately 400 deaths per year of SUDC in the U.S., with over 200 of these cases being the children aged 1–4 years. SUDC deaths have occurred at the following sites:

- Death at home, history provided: 79%
- Crib or bassinet: 54%
- Adult bed: 36%

The placed and found positions were as follows:

- Placed supine, side, prone*: 10%, 2%, 3%
- Found prone: 89%
- Found face position: down, side: 10%, 8%
- Co-sleeping, sweating when found: 3%, 1%

_{*applies only to youngest children}

== History ==
At the SIDS Alliance national convention in Atlanta, GA in 1999 Dr. Henry Krous gave a presentation titled "Post-Infancy SIDS: Is it on the rise?" This led to the beginning of the San Diego SUDC Research Project. The first definition of SUDC was published in 2005 in Pediatric and Developmental Pathology.
