= Marta Cohen =

British pediatric pathologist

Marta Cecilia Cohen
- Education: National University of La Plata
- Occupation: Pediatric pathologist
- Known for: Sudden Infant Death syndrome

Marta Cecilia Cohen (Trenque Lauquen, Buenos Aires Province, 1961) OBE is a clinical pediatric pathologist, and currently head of the Department of Histopathology and Clinical Director of Pharmacy, Pathology, and Genetics at Sheffield Children's Hospital, and an honorary professor at the University of Sheffield. Her clinical work focusses on sudden infant death.

== Biography ==
Marta Cecilia Cohen studied at National University of La Plata. Cohen has previously worked residency positions at the Hospital de Clínicas and the Ricardo Gutiérrez Children's Hospital (both in Buenos Aires), as well as possessing a Pediatric Pathology fellowship at the Red Cross War Memorial Children's Hospital in Cape Town. In 2003 Cohen joined the Sheffield Children's Hospital. Cohen was president of the International Association of Pediatric Pathology from 2016 to 2018, and was included on the 2019 Power List by The Pathologist. Cohen was awarded an Order of the British Empire in the 2020 Birthday Honours list.

Cohen is considered to be sceptic of shaken baby syndrome, arguing that there has never been evidence that proves its existence. Her stance has led to restrictions in the past on giving expert testimony in court cases.

Cohen has served in several influential positions: the chair of the scientific committee of the world congress of ISPID 2016: International Society for Study and Prevention of Perinatal and Infant Death; a board member of The International Society for Study and Prevention of Perinatal and Infant Death; and the Past President of the International Paediatric Pathology Association.

She is also on the editorial board of the medical journal Pediatric and Developmental Pathology, and she has been a co-editor of three books and one-book series with Cambridge University Press.

== Selected works ==
- Cohen, M. C., & Kaschula, R. O. C. (1992). Primary pulmonary tumors in childhood: a review of 31 years' experience and the literature. Pediatric pulmonology, 14(4), 222–232.
- Cohen, M. C., Roper, E. C., Sebire, N. J., Stanek, J., & Anumba, D. O. (2005). Placental mesenchymal dysplasia associated with fetal aneuploidy. Prenatal diagnosis, 25(3), 187–192.
- Sawal, M., Cohen, M., Irazuzta, J. E., Kumar, R., Kirton, C., Brundler, M. A., ... & Klonin, H. (2009). Fulminant pertussis: a multi‐center study with new insights into the clinico‐pathological mechanisms. Pediatric pulmonology, 44(10), 970–980.
- Cohen, M. C., Paley, M. N., Griffiths, P. D., & Whitby, E. H. (2008). Less invasive autopsy: benefits and limitations of the use of magnetic resonance imaging in the perinatal postmortem. Pediatric and Developmental Pathology, 11(1), 1–9.
- Cohen, M. C., Offiah, A., Sprigg, A., & Al-Adnani, M. (2013). Vitamin D Deficiency and Sudden Unexpected Death in Infancy and Childhood: A Cohort Study. Pediatric and Developmental Pathology, 16(4), 292–300. https://doi.org/10.2350/13-01-1293-OA.1
- Ayoub, D. M., Hyman, C., Cohen, M., & Miller, M. (2014). A critical review of the classic metaphyseal lesion: traumatic or metabolic?. American Journal of Roentgenology, 202(1), 185–196.
