= Sudden arrhythmic death syndrome =

- Other names: Sudden adult death syndrome (SADS), bed death, sudden unexpected/unexplained death syndrome (SUDS), sudden unexpected/unexplained nocturnal death syndrome (SUNDS), sudden death syndrome, sudden death
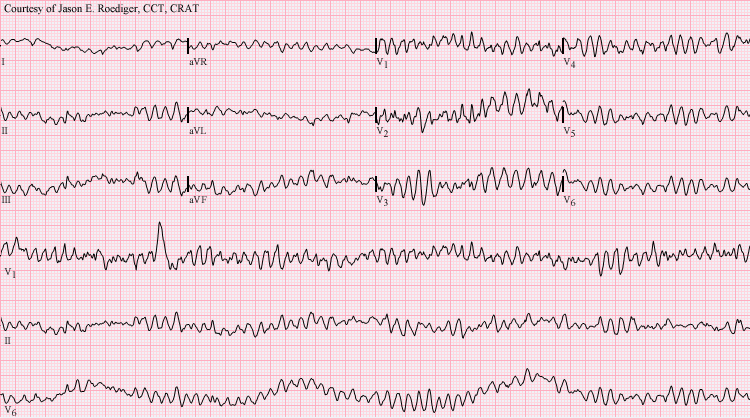
- A type of a deadly ventricular arrhythmia - Ventricular fibrillation pattern seen on an ECG
- Specialty: Cardiology
- Causes: Ion channelopathies: Long QT syndrome (LQTS), Brugada syndrome, CPVT (catecholaminergic polymorphic ventricular tachycardia), PCCD (progressive cardiac conduction defect), Early repolarization syndrome, Mixed sodium channel disease, Short QT syndrome, Idiopathic ventricular fibrillation (IVF); Structural heart disease: Arrhythmogenic right ventricular cardiomyopathy (ARVC), Dilated cardiomyopathy (DCM), Hypertrophic cardiomyopathy (HCM), Wolff-Parkinson-White Syndrome (WPW), Mitral valve prolapse (MVP)
- Risk factors: Family history of heart disease, Asian ancestry, Primary arrhythmia, atherosclerosis, alcohol abuse, type 1 diabetes
- Frequency: ~1-3/100,000

Sudden arrhythmic death syndrome (SADS) is the sudden and unexpected death of adolescents and adults caused by cardiac arrest. However, the exact cause of the cardiac arrest, and thus the exact cause of death, is unknown. These deaths occur mainly during sleep or at rest. One type of conduction defect known as Brugada syndrome can be responsible.

The syndrome is rare in most areas around the world but occurs in populations that are culturally and genetically distinct. It was first noted in 1977 among southeast Asian Hmong refugees in the United States and Canada. The syndrome was again noted in Singapore when a retrospective review of records showed that 230 otherwise healthy Thai foreign workers living in Singapore died suddenly of unexplained causes between 1982 and 1990.

== Causes ==
Sudden death of a young person can be caused by heart disease (including cardiomyopathy, congenital heart disease, myocarditis, genetic connective tissue disorders) or conduction disease (WPW syndrome, etc.), medication-related causes or other causes. Rare diseases called ion channelopathies may play a role such as long QT syndrome (LQTS), Brugada syndrome (BrS), CPVT (catecholaminergic polymorphic ventricular tachycardia), progressive cardiac conduction defect (PCCD), early repolarization syndrome, mixed sodium channel disease, and short QT syndrome. In 20% of cases, no cause of death can be found, even after extensive examination.

Sudden arrhythmic death syndrome in alcohol abuse is a significant cause of death among heavy drinkers, characterized by older age and severe liver damage, highlighting the need for family screening for heritable channelopathies.

In young people with type 1 diabetes, unexplained deaths could be due to nighttime hypoglycemia triggering abnormal heart rhythms or cardiac autonomic neuropathy, damage to nerves that control the function of the heart.

Medical examiners have taken into account various factors, such as nutrition, toxicology, heart disease, metabolism, and genetics. Although there is no real known definite cause, extensive research showed victims aged 18 or older were found to have had a hypertrophic cardiomyopathy, a condition in which the heart muscle becomes oddly thickened without any obvious cause. This was the most commonly identified abnormality in sudden death of young adults. Where people have died suddenly, it is most commonly found that they had had CAD (coronary artery disease) or ASCAD (atherosclerotic coronary artery disease), or any level of stress. However, studies reveal that people were known to have had symptoms within the week before the terminal event such as chest pain at ~52% of patients, dyspnea at ~22%, and syncope at ~7%. About 19% are not known to have experienced symptoms. Scientists have also associated this syndrome with a mutation of gene SCN5A that affects the function of the heart. A 2011 autopsy-based study found that sudden death was attributed to a cardiac condition in 79.3% of cases, and was unexplained in 20.7%.

In the Philippines, sudden adult death syndrome (called bangungot) is mainly caused by the Brugada syndrome.

== Diagnosis ==
By definition, the diagnosis can only occur post-mortem after other causes are ruled out.

== Prevention ==
A 2011 retrospective cohort study using demographic and autopsy data for a 10-year period comprising 15.2 million person-years of active surveillance suggested that prevention of sudden death in young adults should focus on evaluation for causes known to be associated with SCD (e.g., primary arrhythmia) among those under 35 years old, and emphasise atherosclerotic coronary disease in those older.

A 2003 study found that the only proven way to prevent SADS is with an implantable cardioverter-defibrillator. Oral beta-blockers such as propranolol were found to be ineffective.

== Epidemiology ==
In 1980, a reported pattern of sudden deaths was brought to the attention of the Centers for Disease Control. The first reported sudden death occurred in 1948 when there were 81 similar deaths of Filipino men in Oahu County, Hawaii. However, it did not become relevant because there was no associated pattern. This syndrome continued to become more significant as years went on. By 1981–1982, the annual rate in the United States was high with 92/100,000 among Laotians-Hmong, 82/100,000 among other Laotian ethnic groups, and 59/100,000 among Cambodians.

In a 2008 study it was found that over half of SADS deaths could be attributed to inherited heart disease: unexplained premature sudden deaths in family, long QT syndrome, Brugada syndrome, arrhythmogenic right ventricular cardiomyopathy and others.

A national SADS study in England, funded by the British Heart Foundation, reported results in a 2007 journal article published in Health. The study surveyed 117 coroners' jurisdictions in England. Researchers found that deaths from SADS reported by these coroners occurred "predominantly in young males". There were 500 cases a year in England, eight times more than had previously been estimated. Families are more at risk of SADS if they have a genetic cardiac disease. The study recommended that affected families should undergo "specialised cardiological evaluation".

=== Asia ===
Southeast Asian immigrants, who were mostly fleeing the Vietnam War, most often had this syndrome, marking Southeast Asia as the area containing the most people with this fatal syndrome. There are other Asian populations that were affected, such as Filipinos and Chinese Filipinos, Japanese in Japan, and natives of Guam in the United States and Guam. The immigrants with this syndrome were about 33 years old and seemingly healthy, and all but one of the Laotian Hmong refugees were men. The condition appears to primarily affect young Hmong men from Laos (median age 33) and Northeastern Thailand (where the population is mainly of Laotian descent).

== History ==
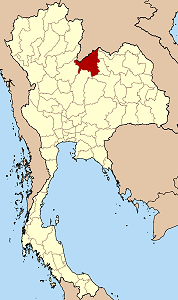
Map of Thailand highlighting Loei Province

Laotian Hmong were chosen for the study because they had one of the highest sudden death rates in the United States while sleeping. They were originally from Southern China and the highlands of North Vietnam, Laos, and Thailand. The location that was picked for this study was in Ban Vinai in the Loei Province, which is approximately 15 kilometers from the Lao border. This study took place between October 1982 and June 1983 as this syndrome became more of a pressing issue. Ban Vinai was the location chosen because it had 33,000 refugees in 1982, and the largest number of recorded SADS deaths. Because this syndrome was occurring most commonly in those particular men, researchers found it most beneficial and effective to study the populations they migrated from instead of studying victims and populations in the U.S. Because of local religious practices, the Hmong men in Ban Vinai did not receive autopsies. Therefore, the only results and research obtained were relating to deaths outside of the local religion or geographical area.

An interview was arranged with the next of kin who lived with them, witnessed the death, or found the body. The interviews were open ended and allowed the person who was next of kin to describe what they witnessed and what preceding events they thought were relevant to the victim's death. The interviewers also collected information such as illness history, the circumstances of the death, demographic background, and history of any sleep disturbances. A genealogy was then created which included all the relatives and their vital status and/or circumstances of death.

== Society, culture, superstition ==
During the 1970s and 1980s, when an outbreak of this syndrome began, many Southeast Asians were not able to worship properly due to the Laotian Civil War. Hmong people believe that when they do not worship properly, do not perform religious rituals properly or forget to sacrifice, the ancestor spirits or the village spirits do not protect them, thus allowing evil spirits to reach them. These attacks induce a nightmare that leads to sleep paralysis, in which the victim is conscious and experiencing pressure on the chest. It is also common to have a REM state that is out of sequence, where there is a mix of brain states that are normally held separate. After the war, the United States government scattered the Hmong refugees across the U.S. in 53 different cities. Once these nightmare visitations began, a shaman was recommended for psychic protection from the spirits of their sleep. However, scattered across 53 different cities, these victims had no access to a shaman who could protect them.

Hmong people believed that rejecting the role of becoming a shaman, they are taken into the spirit world.

The study author suggested that the Hmong who died were killed by their own beliefs in the spiritual world, otherwise known as nocturnal pressing spirit attacks. In Indonesia it is called digeuton, which translates to "pressed on" in English. In China it is called bèi guǐ yā (traditional Chinese: 被鬼壓; simplified Chinese: 被鬼压) which translates to "crushed by a ghost" in English. The Dutch call the presence a nachtmerrie, the night-mare. The "merrie" comes from the Middle Dutch mare, an incubus who "lies on people's chests, suffocating them". This phenomenon is known among the Hmong people of Laos, who ascribe these deaths to a malign spirit, dab tsuam (pronounced "dah chua"), said to take the form of a jealous woman.

Bangungot is depicted in the Philippines as a mythological creature called batibat or bangungot. This hag-like creature sits on the victim's face or chest so as to immobilize and suffocate him. When this occurs, the victim is usually experiencing sleep paralysis.

This phenomenon inspired the Nightmare On Elm Street film series.

=== English names ===
Name	Acronym	Notes
sudden unexpected death syndrome	SUDS	
sudden unexplained death syndrome	SUDS	
sudden unexpected nocturnal death syndrome	SUNDS	
sudden unexplained nocturnal death syndrome	SUNDS	
sudden adult death syndrome	SADS	(parallel in form with SIDS)
sudden arrhythmia death syndrome	SADS	
sudden arrhythmic death syndrome	SADS	
sudden arrhythmic cardiac death syndrome	—	
bed death	—	

== See also ==
- Brugada syndrome
- Night hag
- Sleep paralysis
- Sudden infant death syndrome
- Sudden unexpected death in epilepsy
- Sudden unexplained death in childhood
- Yunnan sudden death syndrome
