= F. Mason Sones =

American physician (1918–1985)

F. Mason Sones, Jr.
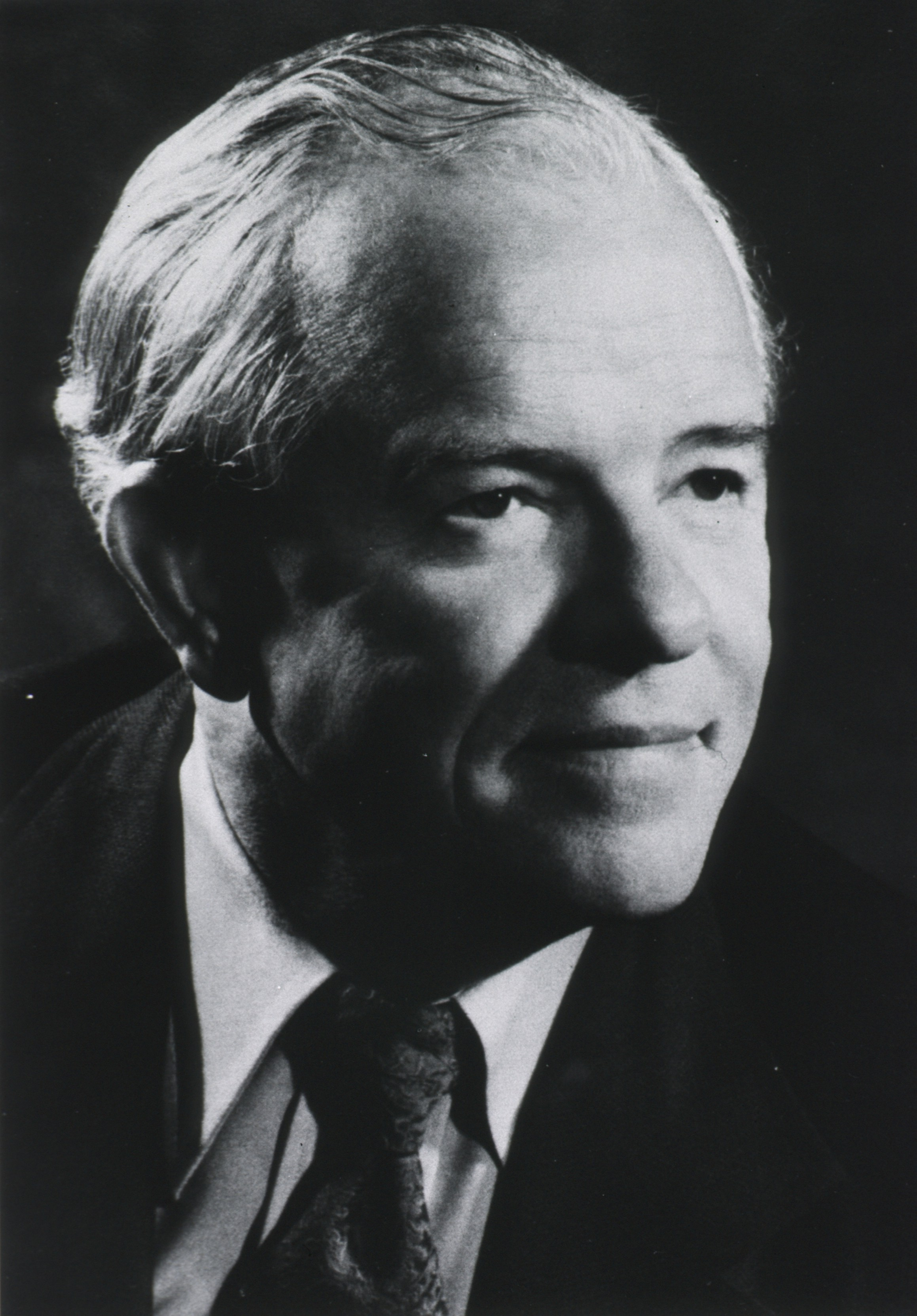
- Sones in 1983
- Born: October 28, 1918; Noxapater, Mississippi, U.S.
- Died: August 28, 1985 (aged 66); Cleveland, Ohio, U.S.
- Burial place: Evergreen Cemetery, Chagrin Falls
- Education: Western Maryland College; University of Maryland (MD)
- Spouse: Geraldine Newton (m. 1942–1985)
- Children: 4
- Medical career
- Field: Cardiology
- Institutions: Cleveland Clinic
- Notable works: Contribution to coronary catheterization, percutaneous coronary intervention, and coronary artery bypass surgery
- Awards: Scientific Achievement Award; Canada Gairdner International Award
- Military career
- Allegiance: United States
- Branch: United States Army
- Service years: 1944–1946
- Conflicts: World War II • Pacific War

F. Mason Sones, Jr. (October 28, 1918 – August 28, 1985) was an American physician whose pioneering work in cardiac catheterization was instrumental in the development of both coronary artery bypass surgery and interventional cardiology.

== Early life and career ==
Sones was born in Noxapater, Mississippi to Frank Mason and Myrtle (Bryan) Sones. He graduated from Western Maryland College (now McDaniel College) in 1940 and received his M.D. from the University of Maryland School of Medicine in 1943. In 1942, Sones married Geraldine Newton. The couple had four children, Frank Mason III, Geraldine Patricia, Steven, and David. From 1944 to 1946, he served in the United States Army Air Corps in the Pacific and would later serve as a national consultant to the Air Force. Sones served as an intern at University Hospital in Baltimore and was a Resident at Henry Ford Hospital in Detroit before joining the Cleveland Clinic Foundation in 1950.

== Discovery of coronary angiography ==
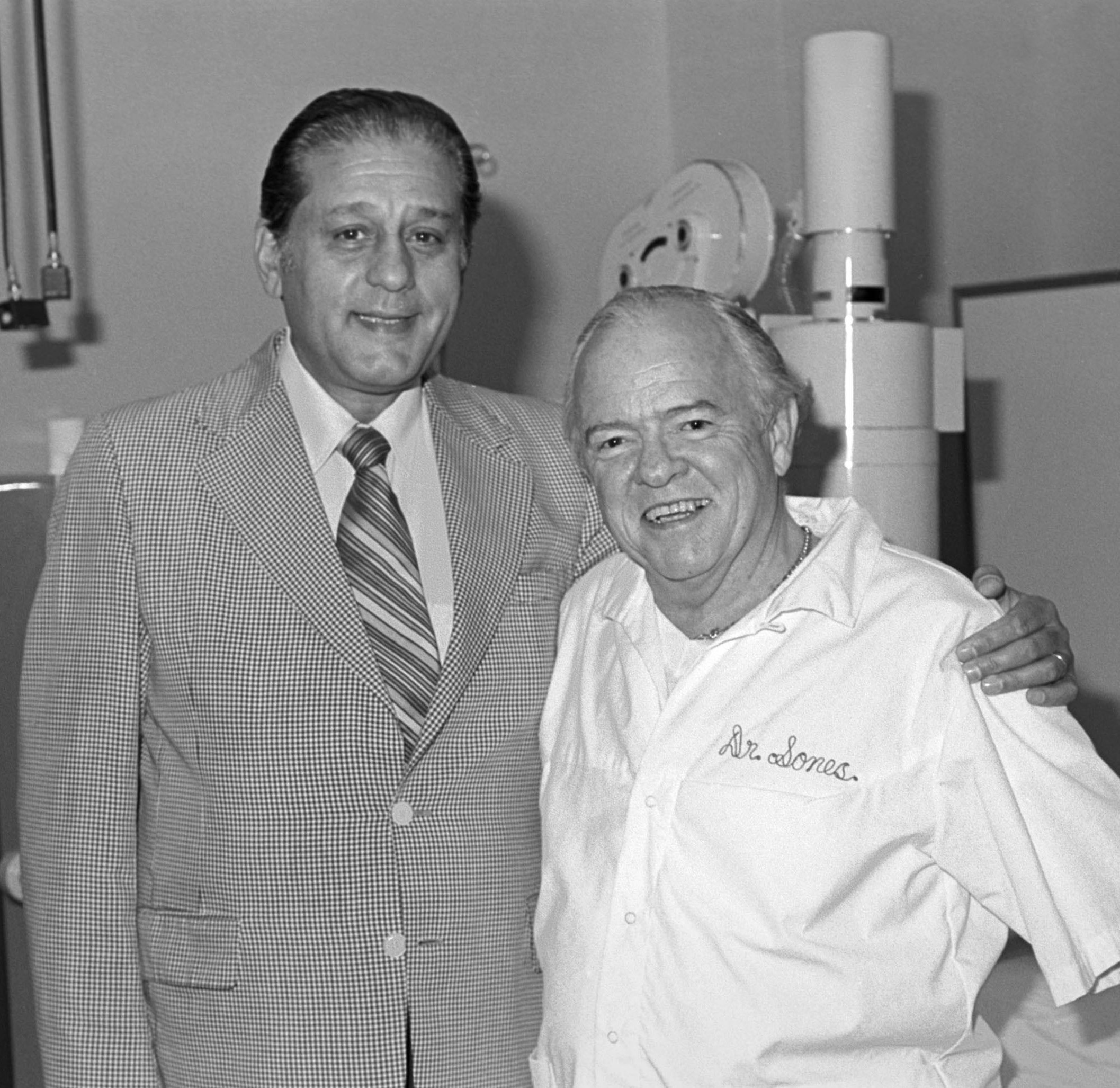
Sones with René Favaloro at the Cleveland Clinic

While at Henry Ford, Sones had learned the techniques of cardiac catheterization and his first appointment at the Cleveland Clinic was as head of Pediatric Cardiology. On October 30, 1958, while working in the Cardiac Laboratory on a 26-year-old patient with rheumatic heart disease, Sones was performing a procedure in which contrast dye was to be injected into the man's aorta. Just before the dye injection, Sones noticed that the catheter tip had inadvertently entered the man's right coronary artery. Sones asked that the catheter be withdrawn, but before that could be accomplished, a large amount of dye was injected directly into the artery. Sones expected the man's heart to go into fibrillation and prepared to do an emergency open chest massage. But instead of fibrillating, the man's heart went into asystole, and Sones shouted at him to cough, which successfully restarted the heart beating.

From this experience, Sones realized that smaller amounts of contrast dye could safely be injected directly into coronary arteries, giving cardiologists accurate pictures of arterial blockages for the first time. Sones subsequently studied video engineering, dye chemistry, and optical image amplification to perfect the procedure. In 1967, Sones' Cleveland Clinic colleague, René Favaloro, performed the world's first coronary bypass surgery. Favaloro called Sones "the most important contributor to modern cardiology" and said that without his work, "all our efforts in myocardial revascularization would have been fruitless."

== Later career and awards ==
Sones was the Director of the Cleveland Clinic Department of Cardiovascular Disease from 1966 to 1975, and later served as senior physician of the Department of Cardiology.

Sones was honored with numerous awards during his career, including the American Medical Association's 1978 Scientific Achievement Award and the Gairdner Foundation International Award in 1969. In 1973 he was awarded the Texas Heart Institute's Ray C. Fish Award. He was a leading participant in the founding of the Society for Cardiac Angiography (now known as the Society for Cardiovascular Angiography and Interventions) and was its first president.

Sones died of lung cancer on August 28, 1985, in Cleveland, at the age of 66, and was buried in Chagrin Falls, Ohio - Evergreen Cemetery.

== Sources ==
- Meyers, Morton A. (2007). Happy Accidents: Serendipity in Modern Medical Breakthroughs. Arcade Publishing. ISBN 978-1-55970-819-7.
- Proudfit, WL; Shirey, EK; Sones, FM Jr (1966). "Selective cine coronary arteriography. Correlation with clinical findings in 1,000 patients". Circulation. 33 (6): 901–10. doi:10.1161/01.cir.33.6.901. PMID 5942973.
- Westaby, Stephen (1997). Landmarks in Cardiac Surgery. Isis Medical Media. ISBN 978-1-899066-54-4.
