= René Favaloro =

Argentine cardiac surgeon (1923–2000)

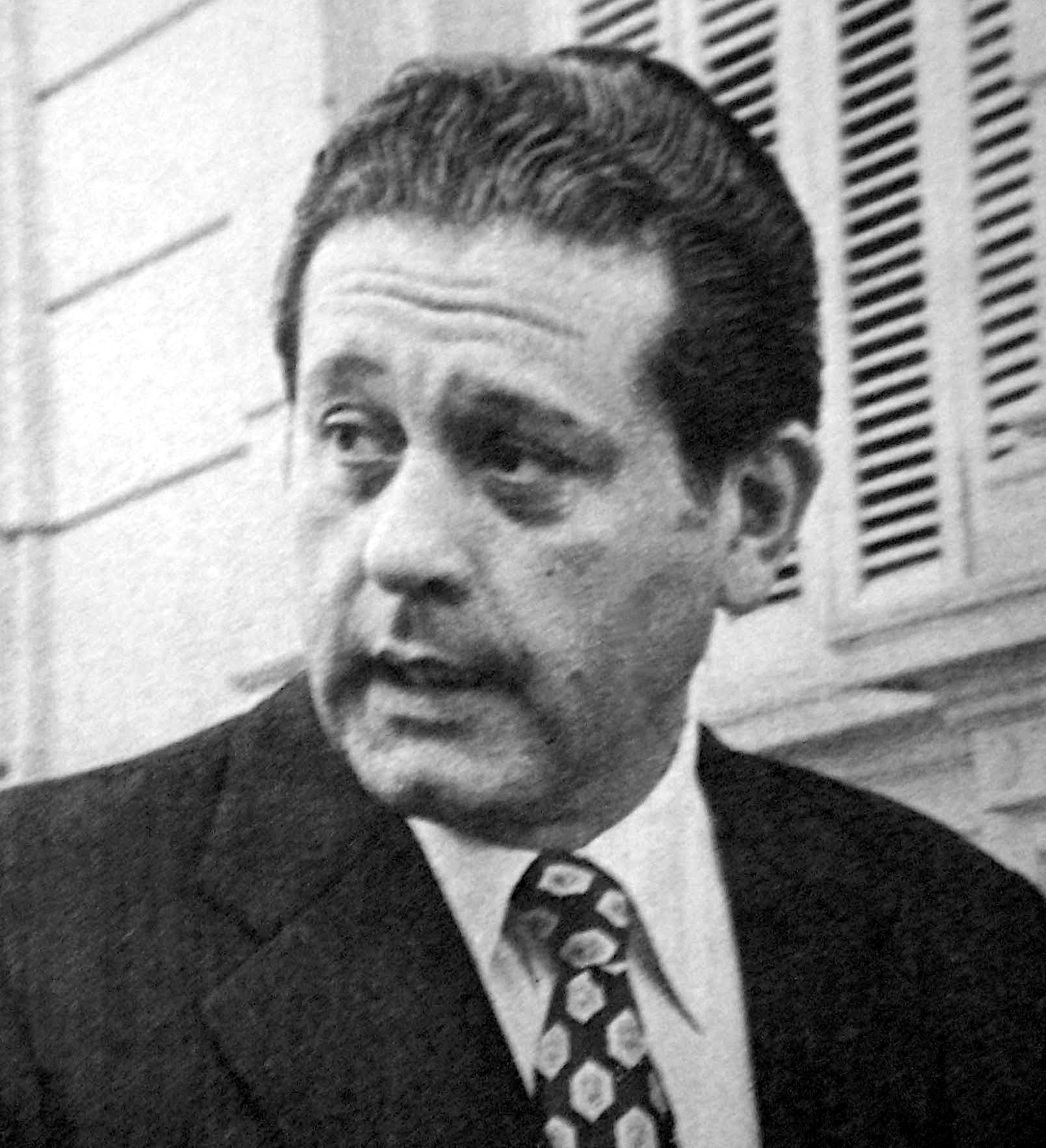
- Favaloro in 1976
- Born: René Gerónimo Favaloro; July 12, 1923; La Plata, Argentina
- Died: July 29, 2000 (aged 77); Buenos Aires, Argentina
- Education: National University of La Plata
- Years active: 1949–2000
- Spouse: María Antonia Delgado (m. 1951–1998)
- Awards: Order of the Sun of Peru (1973); Order of Merit of the Italian Republic (1978); Canada Gairdner International Award (1987); Golden Plate Award (1993); Konex Award (1993); Prince Mahidol Award (1998)

Signature
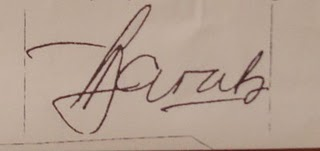

René Gerónimo Favaloro (July 12, 1923 – July 29, 2000) was an Argentine cardiac surgeon and educator best known for his pioneering work on coronary artery bypass surgery using the great saphenous vein.

== Early life ==
René Gerónimo Favaloro was born on July 12, 1923, and raised in La Plata. His parents were Juan Manuel Favaloro and Geni Ida Raffaeli, and his grandparents were Sicilians from the island of Salina. The surname Favaloro is derived from the Sicilian word Favaloru, referring to one who grows or sells beans; the term can also be used to denote a scrounger.

In 1936, Favaloro was admitted into the Colegio Nacional de La Plata. After graduating from high school, he was admitted to the School of Medicine at the National University of La Plata. During his third year, he began his medical residency at the Hospital Policlínico San Martín, a medical center that received the most complicated cases from much of Buenos Aires province. This residency brought him into contact with patients for the first time. He attended procedures carried out by professors José María Mainetti and Federico E. B. Christmann, from whom he learned the simplicity and standardization that he would later apply to cardiovascular surgery, one of his many great contributions to cardiovascular operating techniques. Favaloro graduated with a medical degree in 1949.

He then applied for a position as a medical auxiliary, but the offer required him to enroll in the Peronist Party, which he did not accept. He moved instead to a small town named Jacinto Aráuz in La Pampa Province after being offered a job as the town's doctor; when the resident doctor died, he succeeded him and brought his brother Juan José into the clinic. He married María Antonia Delgado in 1951.

Favaloro and his brother endeavored to improve the general level of health in what was then a remote region. They trained and educated the general public, teachers, and nurses and improved health-care delivery. They equipped the town with an operating room and X-ray and improved the laboratory, thereby providing essential surgical and diagnostic tools.

== Thoracic surgery ==
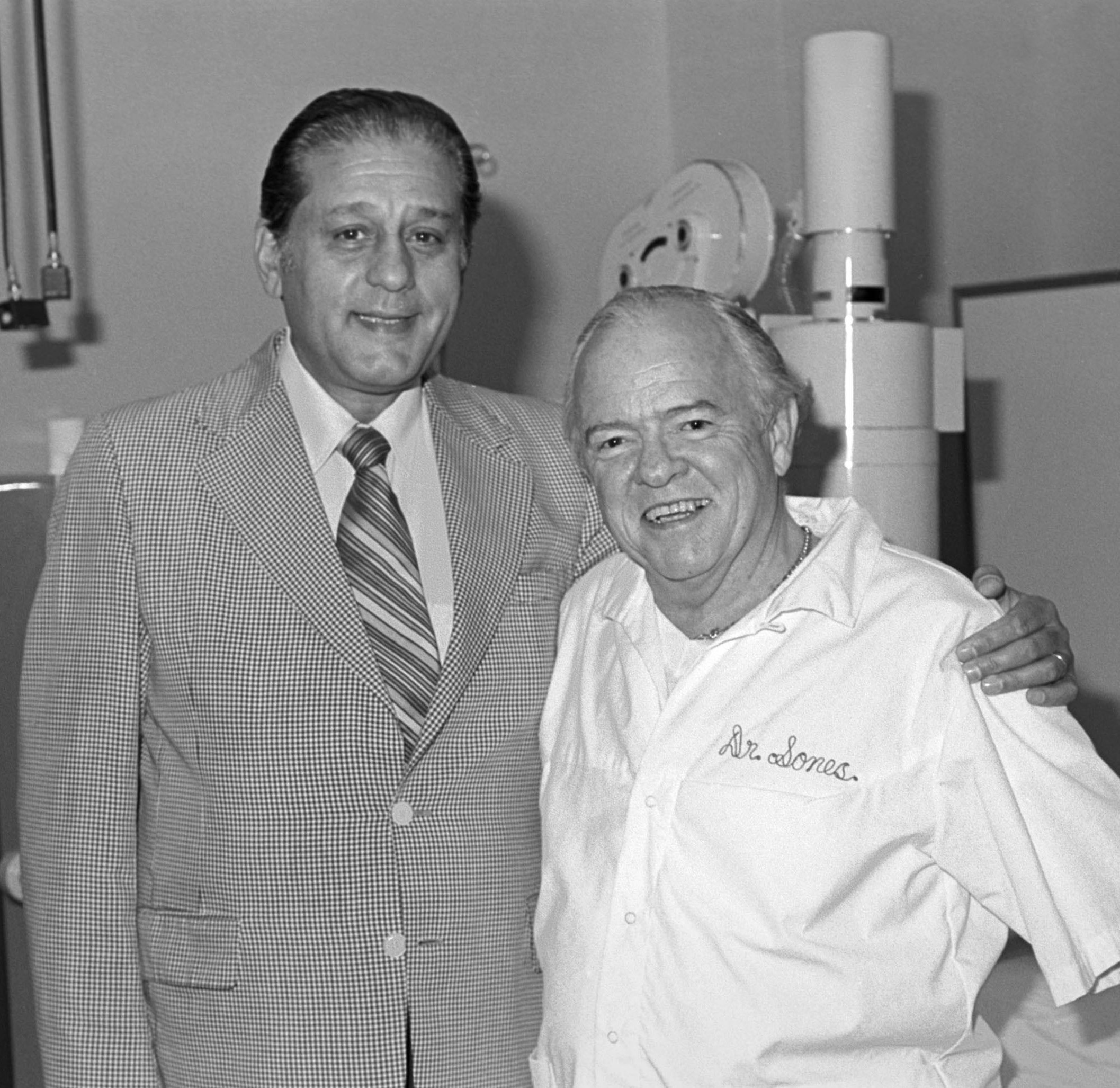
Favaloro with F. Mason Sones, Jr., at the Cleveland Clinic

Favaloro became interested in developments in cardiovascular intervention, and developed an enthusiasm for thoracic surgery. During a visit to La Plata, he met Professor José María Mainetti, who pointed him in the direction of the Cleveland Clinic. Although in the beginning he had doubts about leaving his profession as a rural physician, he thought that he could make a greater contribution to the community on returning from the United States. With few resources and rudimentary English, he decided to travel to Cleveland. He first worked as a resident and later as a member of the surgical team, working with Donald B. Effler, head of cardiovascular surgery, F. Mason Sones, Jr., who was in charge of the Angiography Laboratory, and William L. Proudfit, head of the Department of Cardiology.

In the beginning, the major part of his work involved valvular and congenital diseases; later on, he became interested in other areas. Every day, having hardly finished working in the operating room, Favaloro would spend hours and hours reviewing coronary angiograms and studying coronary arteries and their relation with the cardiac muscle. The laboratory of Sones, father of the coronary angiography, had the largest collection of angiograms in the United States.

In early 1967, Favaloro began to consider the possibility of using the saphenous vein in coronary surgery. He put his ideas into practice for the first time in May of that year. The basic principle was to bypass a diseased (obstructed) segment of a coronary artery in order to deliver blood flow distally. The standardization of this technique, called coronary artery bypass surgery, was the fundamental work of his career, and ensured that his prestige would transcend the limits of his country, as the procedure radically changed the treatment of coronary disease. In 1970, he published one of his best-known volumes, Surgical Treatment of Coronary Arteriosclerosis.

== The Favaloro Foundation ==
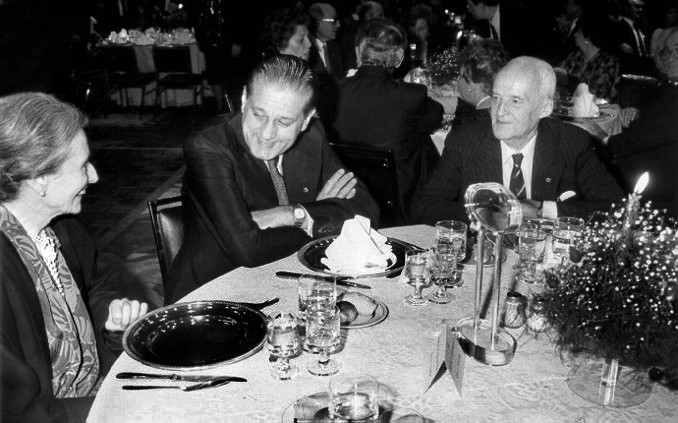
Favaloro enjoys a light moment with Nobel Laureate Luis Leloir and Leloir's wife, Amelia.

Favaloro returned to Argentina in 1971 with the dream of developing a center of excellence similar to the Cleveland Clinic, that combined medical attention, research, and education.

Bearing that in mind, he founded the Fundación Favaloro in 1975 along with several collaborators. He took pride in having trained more than 450 residents from all over Argentina and the Americas. Favaloro contributed to raising the standard level of his specialty for the benefit of patients through innumerable courses, seminars, and conferences organized by the Fundación, among them the distinguished "Cardiology for the Consultant" (Cardiología para el Consultante), held every two years.

In 1980 Favaloro established the "Basic Investigation Laboratory" (Laboratorio de Investigación Básica), which was long financed with his own money and which, at the time, depended upon the support of the Research and Teaching Department of the Fundación Favaloro. Subsequently, it became the Institute of Research in Basic Sciences of the University Institute of Biomedical Sciences (Instituto de Investigación en Ciencias Básicas del Instituto Universitario de Ciencias Biomédicas) which in turn, was transformed into the Universidad Favaloro in August 1998.

In 1992 the nonprofit Favaloro Foundation Institute of Cardiology and Cardiovascular Surgery (Instituto de Cardiología y Cirugía Cardiovascular de la Fundación Favaloro) opened in Buenos Aires. With the motto "advanced technology in the service of medical humanism", this institute offers highly specialized services of cardiology, cardiovascular surgery and heart, lung, cardiopulmonary, liver, kidney, and bone marrow transplants, among other areas. Favaloro focused his career there, surrounded by a selected group of professionals. One of his more famous patients was boxing promoter and Luna Park arena owner Tito Lectoure, on whom Favaloro operated in 1990. It should be mentioned, however, that despite the immense costs of bypass surgery, Favaloro operated daily on indigent patients, something that he felt was both a necessity and his obligation.

He kept his emphasis on disease prevention and promoting basic rules of hygiene to reduce mortality rate.

== Death ==
By 2000, Argentina was submerged in an economic and political crisis, and the Favaloro Foundation was US$18 million in debt. On repeated occasions, Favaloro petitioned the Argentine government to aid the Foundation, but never received an official response, nor would the director of the PAMI public medical insurance agency, Horacio Rodríguez Larreta, agree to pay the agency's debt to the Foundation. On July 29, 2000, at age 77, Favaloro fatally shot himself in the chest.

Following his suicide, it was revealed that he had written a letter to Argentine President Fernando de la Rúa, that had never been read, in which he expressed being tired of "being a beggar in his own country," and asked for de la Rúa's help to raise money for the Foundation.

Although his suicide is often linked to the Foundation's financial difficulties, the letter clearly shows Favaloro felt overwhelmed by the corruption of the health system and that he could not fight against it. In the letter, he refers to himself as "Don Quixote" in his lonely battle against the giants. Aggravating this situation was that Favaloro had never recovered from the death of his wife in 1998. Following her death, he had resolved to marry one of his longtime colleagues and coauthors, Diana Truden; she lived with Favaloro during his final days and was in his Palermo neighborhood house when he committed suicide.

== Recognition and distinctions ==
In a tribute written shortly after Favaloro's death, fellow heart surgeon Denton Cooley wrote: "Although he was always hesitant to carry the moniker of 'father' of coronary artery bypass surgery, he is the surgeon we should credit with introducing coronary bypass surgery into the clinical arena." Favaloro was an active member of 26 societies, corresponding of 4, and honorary of 43. He received innumerable international distinctions. The ones that stand out are: John Scott Prize 1979, granted by Philadelphia; the creation of the Chair of Cardiovascular Surgery "Dr René G. Favaloro" (Tel Aviv University, Israel, 1980); the distinction of the Fundación Conchita Rábago de Giménez Díaz (Madrid, Spain, 1982); the Teacher Prize of Argentinian Medicine (1986); the Distinguished Alumnus Award of the Cleveland Clinic Foundation (1987); The Gairdner Foundation International Award, granted by the Gairdner Foundation (Toronto, Canada, 1987); the René Leriche Prize 1989, granted by the International Surgery Society; the Gifted Teacher Award, granted by the American College of Cardiology (1992); the Golden Plate Award of the American Academy of Achievement (1993); the Diamond Konex Award as the most important scientist in the last decade in his country (Argentina, 1993); and the Prince Mahidol Award, granted by His Majesty the King of Thailand (Bangkok, Thailand, 1999).

On July 12, 2019, Google showed a Doodle celebrating what would have been his 96th birthday.

== Favaloro on television ==
Favaloro participated in educational programming for the public, distinguishing himself in the television series The Great Medical Themes, and in numerous conferences in Argentina and throughout the world on topics such as medicine, education, and modern society. He was also mentioned in the documentary movie Forks Over Knives.
