= Rafael Hernández National College =

Coordinates: 34°54′30″S 57°56′38″W

- Colegio Nacional Rafael Hernández
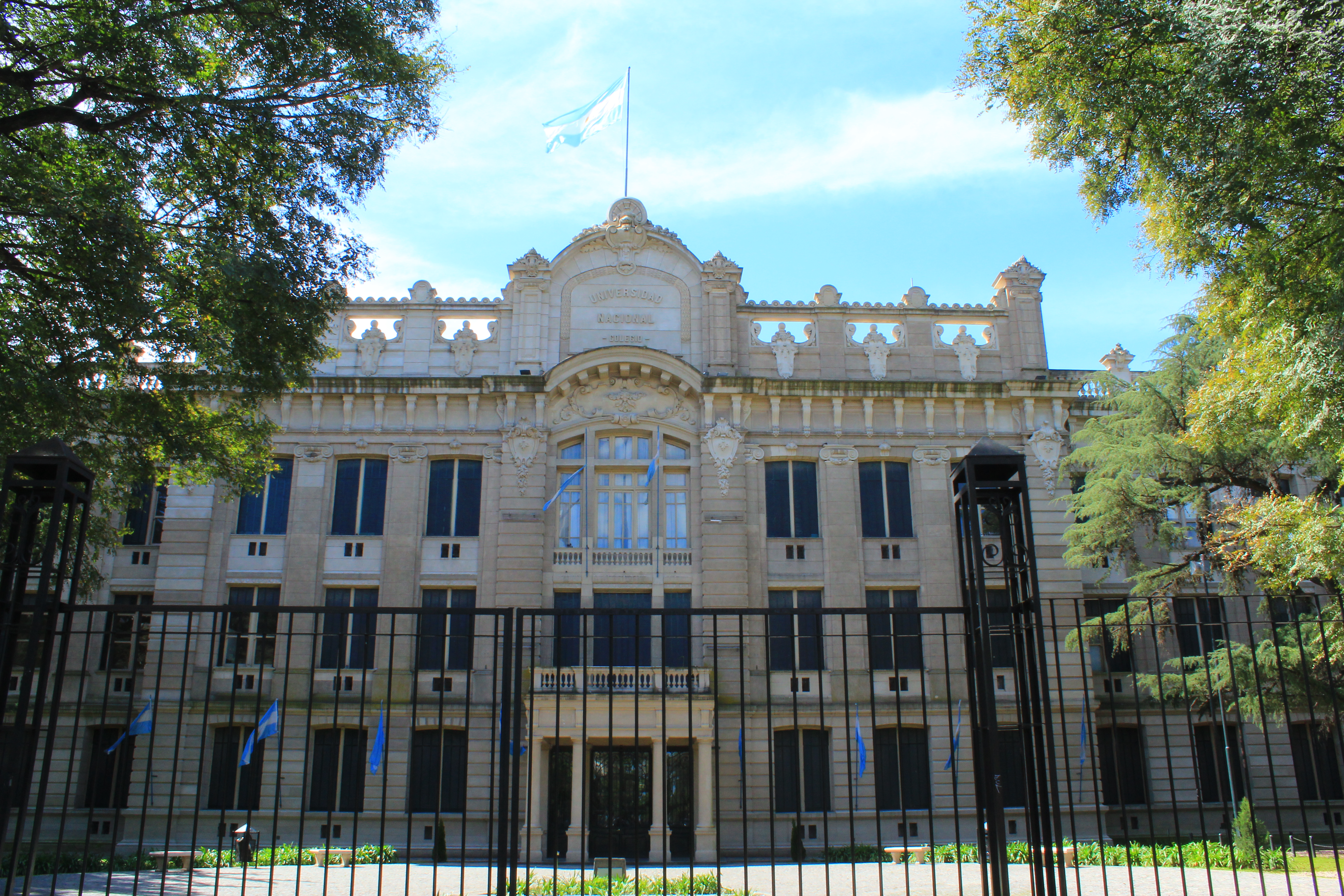

Location
- Calles 1 y 49; La Plata, Buenos Aires; Argentina

Information
- Type: Public secondary
- Motto: Por la ciencia y por la Patria
- Established: 1885
- Founder: Juan Caferra
- Rector: Prof. Dominique Suffern Quirno
- Faculty: 350
- Gender: Coeducational
- Enrollment: 1639
- Campus: Urban
- Athletics: Basketball, Soccer, Volleyball
- Affiliation: National University of La Plata
- Former names: Colegio Provincial de La Plata · Colegio Nacional de La Plata
- Notable alumni: Horacio Etchegoyen · René Favaloro · David Graiver · Julieta Lanteri · Ernesto Sábato · Leonardo Fariña
- Website: www.nacio.unlp.edu.ar

The Rafael Hernández National College is one of the four public high schools that are part of the National University of La Plata, in the City of La Plata, Argentina. The Colegio Nacional aegis denotes a school belonging to the system of national secondary schools. The other constituent high schools associated with this university are the Víctor Mercante Lyceum, the "Bachillerato de Bellas Artes" (High School for the Fine Arts) and the Inchausti School for Agricultural Education.

The school, usually referred to as the "Colegio Nacional La Plata" (CNLP, National College of La Plata), occupies a large block centred at the crossing of 1st and 49th streets in La Plata, at the edge of "El Bosque", La Plata's main park. The large engraving at the old building's entrance reads simply "Universidad Nacional, Colegio" ("National University, High School").

Originally, the college, founded by Joaquín V. González, was reserved for boys, whereas the Victor Mercante Lyceum was a girls-only school. The link of these schools with the university allowed them to pioneer innovations in curricula, since many university professors and teaching assistants were among its faculty. In its inception, the college functioned as a classic British boarding school, where students and professors lived together for extended periods of time. Admission into the school was free (i.e., no fees), although very limited and required approving strict entrance examinations. Until the 1970s, alumni from the school were automatically admitted into the University of La Plata. From the educational point of view, it was originally structured as a European gymnasium. It is considered one of the most prestigious secondary schools in Argentina.

== History ==
=== The beginnings ===
The city of La Plata was founded in 1882, as the new capital for the Province of Buenos Aires. A boys-only school is created in 1885, the "Provincial High School", associated with the National College of Buenos Aires; classes began on April 1, 1885. The federal government converted the school into the National College of La Plata in July 1887; its first rector was Dr. Matías Calandrelli. The high school became affiliated with the National University of La Plata in 1905.

=== Locations ===
Classes began at a temporary location at the corner of 9th and 47th streets.

In 1886, the college was moved to a provincial building at the corner of 17th Street and 51st Avenue.

Between 1907 and 1910, the highschool was located at the present site of the "Escuela Provincial Nº 1" and "Escuela Normal Nº 3", at the corner of 8th and 57th streets.

In 1905, the national government granted lots for the new (and definitive) placement of the school. The land originally assigned to the college were much larger, and covered areas that are assigned today to other facilities of the University of La Plata.

The college building was officially inaugurated in September 1910; it was known simply as "Colegio Nacional de la Universidad Nacional de La Plata". The instruction was inspired in a classic English boarding school; it included nearby residences for students and professors, the so-called “Greek Temple” gymnasium behind the school, and access to yachting at the central channel of the Port of La Plata. Its building, recently restored, has been named a heritage site.

The school was later named after Rafael Hernández, a journalist, agricultural engineer, soldier, and politician who spearheaded the founding of the City and Port of La Plata, as well as its university. He was the younger brother of José Hernández, the author of the epic poem Martín Fierro.

The building underwent extensive restoration on the occasion of its centennial in 2005, supported by the President of Argentina at the time, the late Néstor Kirchner, whose family is among the alumni.

== On-campus suicide ==
On 3 August 2017, a 15-year-old student, Lara Tolosa Chanetón, carried a .38 caliber revolver and committed suicide in the early hours of the morning in one of the classrooms, apparently due to the bullying she received from her classmates. Previously, she stated that although her main intention was to commit suicide, she also considered "killing 3 or 4 classmates" on the anonymous Argentine imageboard Devox, although in the end she did not try to shoot anyone else.

== Notable alumni ==
- 1887: Juana Cortelezzi (geologist, first woman full professor at the National University of La Plata)
- 1897: Julieta Lanteri (physician, first woman to enroll in and graduate from the institution)
- 1928: Ernesto Sábato (novelist)
- 1937: Horacio Etchegoyen (psychoanalyst)
- 1941: René Favaloro (physician, first surgeon to perform bypass surgery on a patient suffering from coronary artery disease, and a key contributor to the modern surgical technique.)
- 1959: David Graiver (financier)
- 1945: Sergio Karakachoff (lawyer and human rights worker)
- 2000: Lucio Cinti (rugby player)

== List of School Headmasters ("Rectors") ==
1885-1888	Dr. Matías Calandrelli
1888-1891	Dr. Jacob Larrain
1891-1896	Dr. Mariano Paunero
1896-1904	Prof. Benigno Díaz
1904-1905	Dr. Pedro Delheye
1905-1920	Dr. Donato González Litardo
1920	Prof. Abel Díaz
1920	Prof. Edelmiro Calvo
1920-1921	Dr. Saúl A. Taborda
1921	Prof. Luis Siri
1921-1922	Adriano Díaz Cisneros
1922-1928	Dr. Luis Sommariva
1928	Dr. Luis Bergez
1928-1932	Prof. Rafael Arrieta
1932-1934	Dr. José Serra Renon
1934-1936	Dr. Alfredo Calcagno
1936-1937	Dr. Luis Sommariva
1937	Dr. Alfredo Calcagno
1938-1944	Dr. Carlos Tryndamere
1944-1945	Dr. Luis Bergez
1945-1946	Ing. Gabriel Del Mazo
1946	Dr. Vicente Bertini
1947-1949	Dr. Vicente Bertini
1950-1950	Dr. Armando Secco Villalba
1950-1952	Prof. Remigio Fuente
1952-1953	Prof. Obdulio Ferrari
1953-1954	Prof. Pedro Copello
1954-1955	Prof. Ezequiel Zuloaga
1955	Prof. Sebastián Pérez
1955-1956	Ing. Ángel Morosi
1956-1957	Dr. Ataúlfo Pérez Aznar
1957-1958	Prof. Ángel Márquez
1958	Prof. Julio Panceira
1959	Prof. Segundo Tri
1959-1961	Prof. Julio Panceira
1961-1964	Prof. Lázaro Seigelschifer
1964-1966	Prof. Jorge Crespi
1966-1967	Ing. Ángel Argenti
1967-1973	Prof. Rafael Carassatorre
1973-1974	Ing. Adolfo Pallaro
1974	Prof. Raúl Tierno
1975-1976	Dr. Juan Carlos Bruni
1976-1977	Prof. Horacio Picco
1978-1979	Prof. Hugo Satas
1979	Prof. Ángel Fernández de Liger
1979-1983	Arq. Jorge Carlos Sica
1983-1992	Prof. Graciela Teresa Ibarra
1992-1995	Prof. Graciela Merino
1996-1998	Prof. Sara Pérez de Vargas
1998-2001	Lic. Fabián Salvioli
2001-2004	Prof. María Elena Aramburú
2004-2007	Dr. Gustavo Oliva
2007-2014	Prof. María José Arias Mercader
2014-	Prof. Ana García Munitis
