= Juana Cortelezzi =

Argentine geologist (1887–1973)

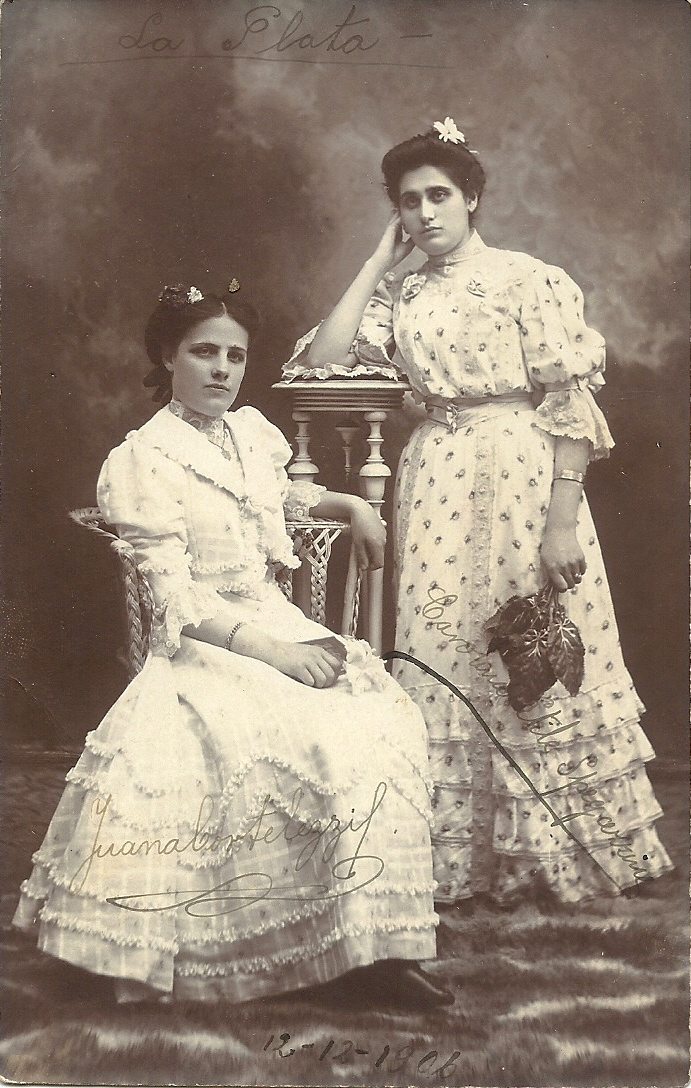
- Carolina Etile Spegazzini (right) and Juana Cortelezzi (left)
- Born: 1887
- Died: 1973 (aged 85–86)
- Education: National University of La Plata

Juana Cortelezzi (8 march 1887, La Plata - 12 july 1973, La Plata) was an Argentine scientist and professor, with outstanding performance in the area of mineralogy. She is recognized for being the first woman to reach the position of full professor at the National University of La Plata and for her contributions in teaching geology.

== Biography ==
Coming from a traditional La Plata family, Juana Cortelezzi attended her secondary studies at the Rafael Hernández National College in La Plata. She continued her studies at the La Plata Museum, where she graduated in 1909 as a pharmacist and as a secondary school teacher in natural sciences and chemistry, both from the National University of La Plata.

At the age of 17, she published her first work, where she described the importance of observing nature, especially botany, and how to teach it, in the Archives of Pedagogy and Related Sciences, of the currently called Faculty of Humanities of the UNLP.

Also since 1907, Cortelezzi was a science teacher at the College of Women at the University of La Plata (later the Liceo Víctor Mercante), an institution of which she was appointed rector by Ricardo Levene in 1934. During her tenure, she introduced a series of modifications in teaching, which included field trips for learning science, physical and artistic education.

From 1920 she worked as a professor of Pedagogical Practice of Mineralogy and Geology on the faculty of Humanities and Educational Sciences. In 1926, she was appointed as head of Practical Works of Natural Sciences at the University of Buenos Aires. In 1927, she received her doctorate in chemistry. In 1928, she was appointed head of Practical Works of the Department of Mineralogy and Geology at the Museum of La Plata. In 1933, she obtained by competition the position of Titular Professor by the chair of Mineralogy and Petrography, becoming the first woman to access this position at the UNLP. In said competition she prevailed before renowned geologists, thanks to her teaching performance, her task in the ordering of the collections, and her studies in mineralogy. She resigned from the post in 1939. She is recognized as a pioneer in the university teaching of Geology.

Juana Cortelezzi studied in 1933 and 1936 at the Institute of Mineralogy and Petrography of the Heidelberg University in Germany. Thanks to these postgraduate studies, the Museo de la Plata strengthened her ties with the German mineralogical school. In 1936, the University of La Plata appointed her as its representative to this German university. She was a special guest at the Berlin Olympics, traveling as a passenger on the Graf Zeppelin, shortly before it was put out of use. In 1939, she made a trip where she visited different universities in the United States.

She was also a member of la Sociedad Ornitológica del Plata.

Throughout her career, she carried out numerous and varied investigations that resulted in scientific publications, especially in German and French magazines. In 1940, at the age of 53, she joined an expedition to Mount Aconcagua with the renowned professor Walter Schiller.

== Honors ==
Juana Cortelezzi was recognized as one of the 12 outstanding people in the selection made by the Argentine Society of Writers of La Plata, and a brief profile was included in the publication "12 Personalities of the Century" on the occasion of the Centennial of the City of La Plata in 1982.

She was mentioned in the presentation by Juan J. Burgos in his speech before the National Academy of Agronomy and Veterinary Medicine "because in addition to her important work in mineralogy, she has left roots in the museum."
