= Primary ventricular fibrillation =

Heart condition

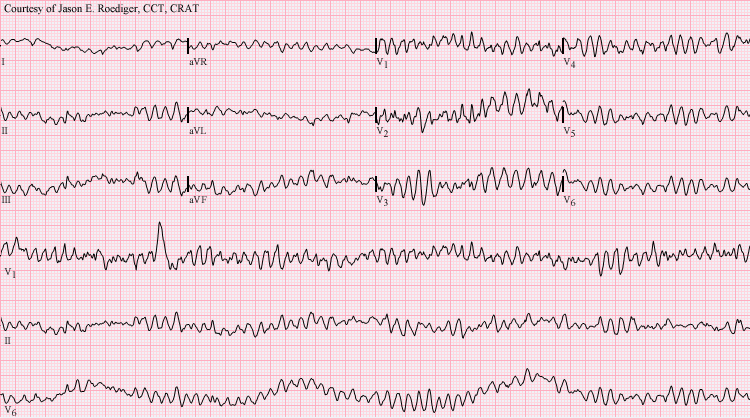
12-lead ECG of ventricular fibrillation

Primary ventricular fibrillation (PVF) is an unpredictable and potentially fatal arrhythmia occurring during the acute phase of a myocardial infarction leading to immediate collapse and, if left untreated, leads to sudden cardiac death within minutes. In developed countries, PVF is a leading cause of death. Worldwide, the annual number of deaths caused by PVF is comparable to the number of deaths caused by road traffic accidents. A substantial portion of these deaths could be avoided by seeking immediate medical attention when symptoms are noticed.

== Risk factors ==
The risk of PVF during acute myocardial infarction is related to the amount of ST elevation, the presence of hypokalemia, the absence of pre-infarction angina, the size of the infarction, and the presence of a blocked left coronary artery. Other risk factors could include younger age, male gender, and history of sudden cardiac death in first degree relatives.

== Diagnosis ==
=== Definition ===
PVF is defined as ventricular fibrillation not preceded by heart failure or shock, in contrast to secondary ventricular fibrillation, which is a complication of severe pump failure, such as cardiogenic shock or advanced heart failure.

== Prognosis ==
After return of heart function, there has been a moderately higher risk of death in the hospital when compared to MI patients without PVF. Whether this still holds true with the recent changes in treatment strategies of earlier hospital admission and immediate angioplasty with thrombus removal is unknown. PVF does not affect the long-term prognosis.

=== Survival ===
The survival of PVF largely depends on the promptness of defibrillation. The success rate of prompt defibrillation during monitoring is currently higher than 95%. It is estimated that the success rate decreases by 10% for each additional minute of delay.

== Incidence ==
Approximately 10% of all myocardial infarctions lead to PVF. The incidence peaks between 20 and 50 minutes after the start of the MI. 2/3 of events occur before medical attendance, and of these medically unattended events, 2/3 occur after more than 30 minutes of warning symptoms.
