= Pediatric and Developmental Pathology =

Medical journal

- Discipline: Pediatrics; Pathology
- Language: English
- Edited by: Pierre Russo

Publication details
- History: 1998–present
- Publisher: SAGE Publications
- Frequency: Bimonthly
- Impact factor: 1.250 (2017)

Standard abbreviations
- ISO 4: Pediatr. Dev. Pathol.

Indexing
- CODEN: PDPAFU
- ISSN: 1093-5266 (print); 1615-5742 (web)

Links
- Journal homepage

Pediatric and Developmental Pathology is a bimonthly peer-reviewed medical journal covering clinical pathology as it relates to pediatrics. It was established in 1998 and is published by SAGE Publications. It is the official journal of the Society for Pediatric Pathology and the Paediatric Pathology Society. The editor-in-chief is Pierre Russo (Children's Hospital of Philadelphia). According to the Journal Citation Reports, the journal has a 2017 impact factor of 1.250, ranking it 61st out of 79 in the category "Pathology" and 85th out of 124 journals in the category "Pediatrics".
