= National University of La Plata =

Public university in Argentina

Coordinates: 34°54′46.69″S 57°57′04.88″W

La Plata National University
- Universidad Nacional de La Plata
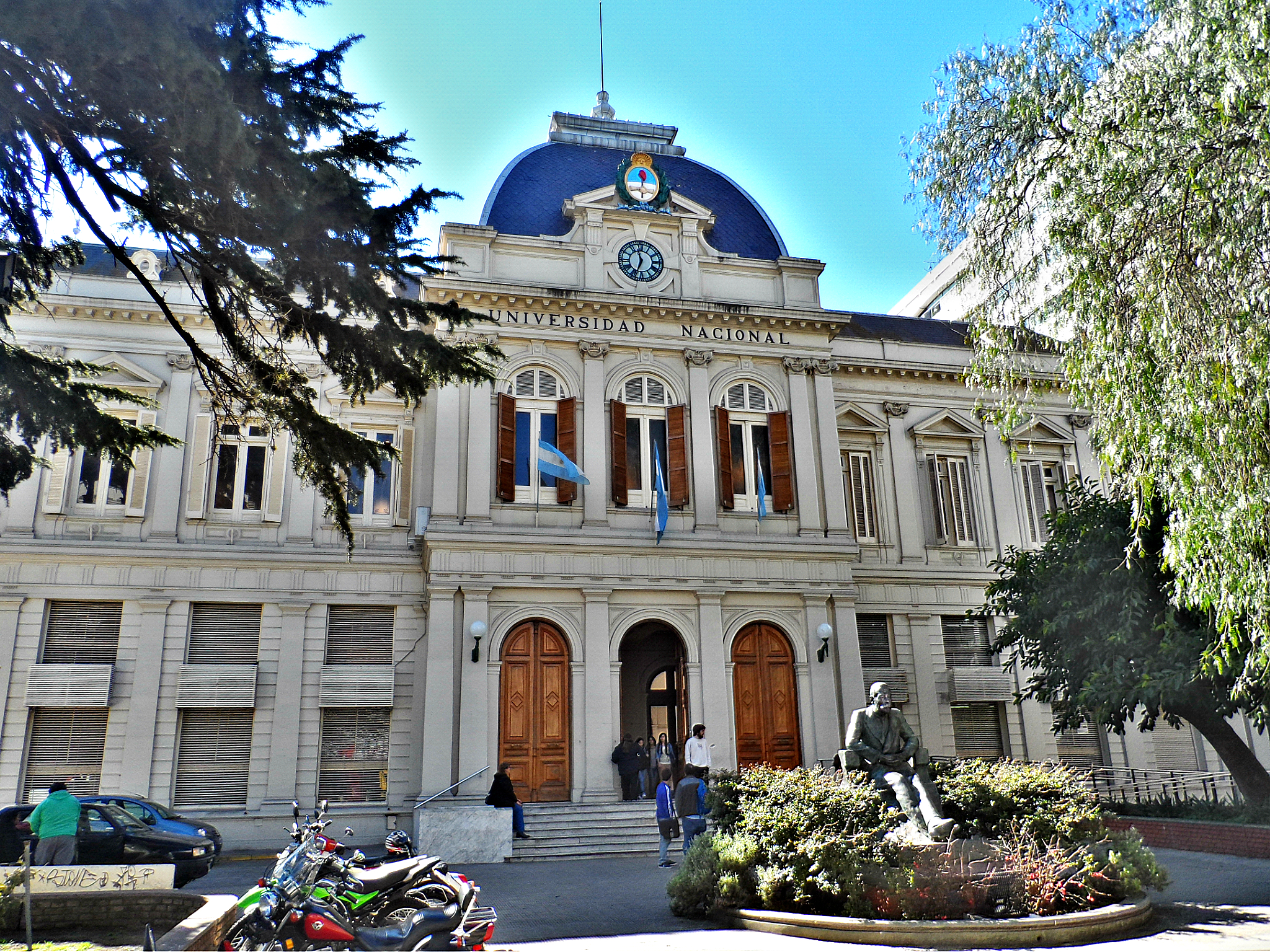
- UNLP Rector Office in 2013
- Former name: Universidad Provincial de La Plata
- Motto: Pro scientia et patria (Latin)
- Motto in English: For science and homeland
- Type: Public non-sectarian higher education institution
- Established: 1897; 129 years ago
- President: Martín López Armengol
- Academic staff: 10,400
- Students: 91,135
- Location: La Plata, Buenos Aires Province, Argentina
- Website: unlp.edu.ar
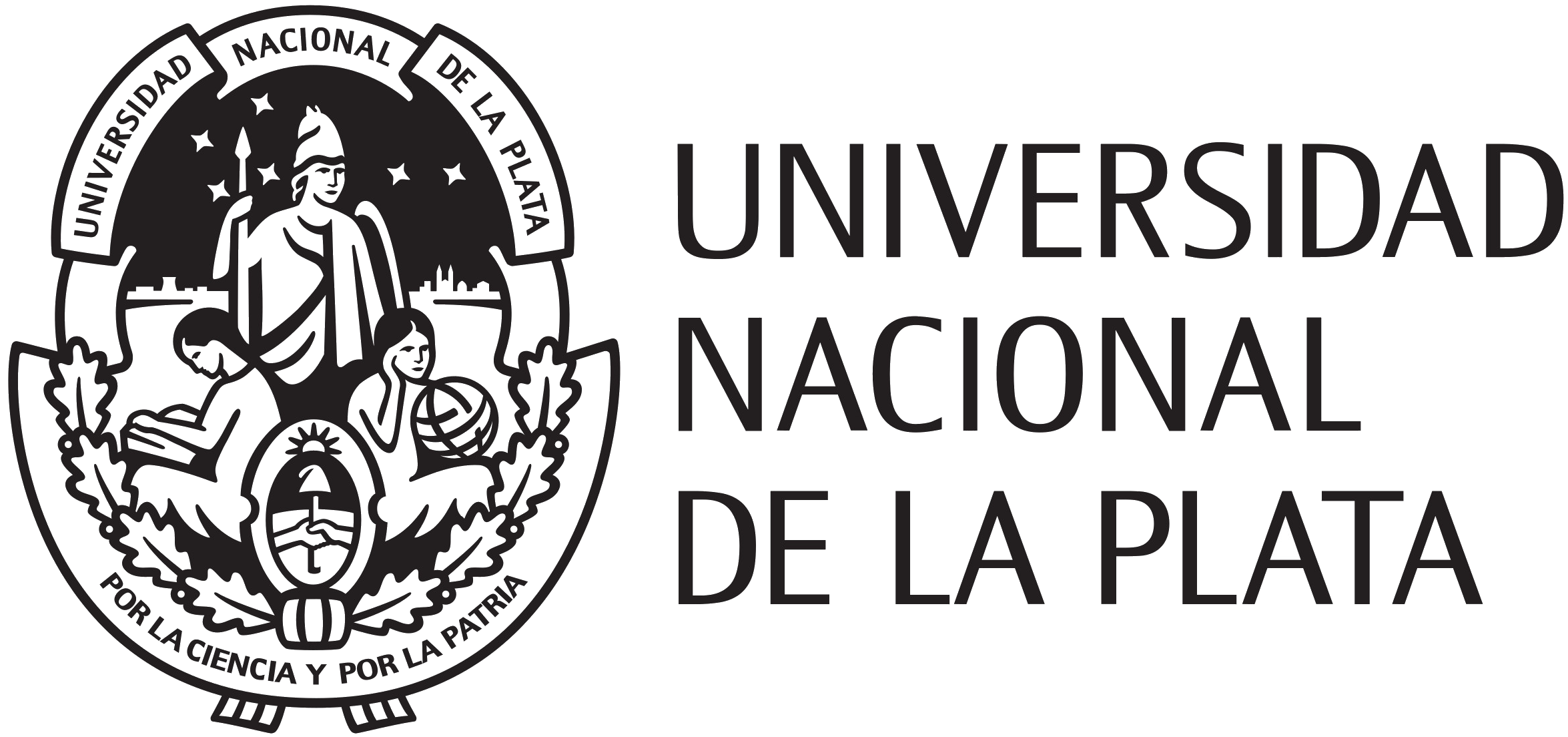

The National University of La Plata (Spanish: Universidad Nacional de La Plata, UNLP) is a national public research university located in the city of La Plata, capital of Buenos Aires Province, Argentina. It has over 90,000 regular students, 10,000 teaching staff, 17 departments and 106 available degrees.

UNLP comprises the Rafael Hernández National College, the Victor Mercante Lyceum, the Bachelor of Fine Arts program, the School of Agronomy, the La Plata University Radio, the La Plata University Press and numerous academic centers for research and outreach including La Plata Museum of Natural Sciences, the University Public Library, the Samay Huasi Retreat for Artists and Writers, the Institute of Physical Education, the Astronomical Observatory and the Santa Catalina Rural Association.

The institution began operations on April 18, 1897, as the Universidad Provincial de La Plata with Dardo Rocha as its rector. In 1905, Joaquín V. González, the Minister of Justice and Public Education of the government of Manuel Quintana, decided to nationalize it. González also integrated many municipal scientific institutions into the university, and a year later he became the first president of the National University of La Plata. Today the university holds one of the most important paleontological and anthropological collections in South America.

== History ==
=== Foundation ===
The national capital of Buenos Aires was federalized in 1880. This forced the surrounding Province of Buenos Aires to cede the city, and as a result it was left without the greater part of its institutions. The new provincial capital in La Plata was subsequently founded in 1882 but lacked a center of higher education and investigation. With the purpose of rectifying this situation, the provincial senators Rafael Hernández, Emilio J. Carranza, Marcelino Aravena, and Valentín Fernández Blanco presented a bill on 12 June 1889 to create a provincial university in La Plata.

The proposal had immediate repercussions in the city of La Plata. On 13 June, about 150 youths from the National College, the Argentine Institute, and the Literary Society mobilized around the home of Rafael Hernández, accompanied by a band, in order to display their support.

The law was once and for all passed by the provincial Chamber of Deputies on 27 December 1889 and was enacted as Law Number 233 by Governor Máximo Paz on 2 January 1890. The new law established the creation of a university of tertiary studies with four faculties: Law, Medicine, Chemistry and Pharmacy, and Mathematical and Physical Sciences.

University rankings

Global – Overall
- QS World: =458 (2026)

The new university was expected to open that same year; however, the governor had not written the corresponding regulatory decree, nor had he even mentioned the issue in his final address to the legislature. Due to this delay, a group of local citizens presented a request to the Ministry of Government on 5 May 1891 declaring their intentions that their children study law in La Plata. However, the file on that request was closed in 1893. On 28 May 1894, a similar request was presented to the new governor, Guillermo Udaondo, insisting on the full completion of Law 233. Despite a favourable report made by the Consultancy Office of the government on 28 July of that year, the Ministry of Economy and Government did not advance on the determination of expenses or assignation of resources and a new note was sent to the governor in December 1896.

Concurrently, Dardo Rocha, the founder of the city and first provincial governor, was developing the founding bylaws at the request of Governor Udaondo. This was finally sanctioned on 8 February 1897 — seven years after the passing of the law. The first University Assembly came together on 14 February and designated Dardo Rocha himself as the first rector of the university. Studies began on 18 April in the Banco Hipotecario building — the present-day site of the Rector's office — with a class on Law History given by Jacob Larrain.

=== Nationalization of the university ===
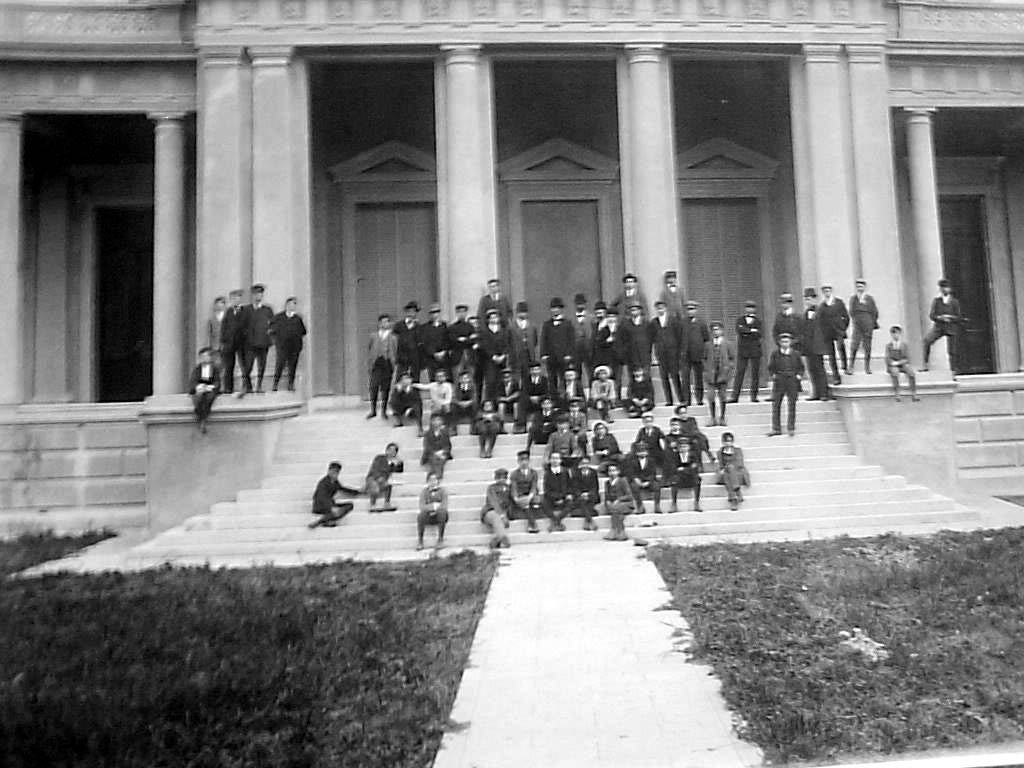
Former Physics Laboratory of the University, c. 1900

Despite the objectives for which it may have been established, the first years of the university were discouraging, as much for the dearth of students as for the low operating budget. From 1897 to 1905, it only succeeded in enrolling 573 students, owing not only to the low population of La Plata in its founding era but also to the lack of national recognition for the degrees it granted, which heightened the attraction exerted by the University of Buenos Aires.

At the same time, Joaquín V. González, then minister of justice and education, began to give shape to his idea of creating a national university on the base of the existing provincial university and other teaching institutes. In October 1904, González, Governor Marcelino Ugarte and the province's congressional delegation convened to advance the nationalization project. This idea took shape with the transfer from a provincial to a national level, on January 1, 1905, of the Veterinary and Agronomy Faculty, the Astronomical Observatory and the fields of Santa Catalina (in Lomas de Zamora).

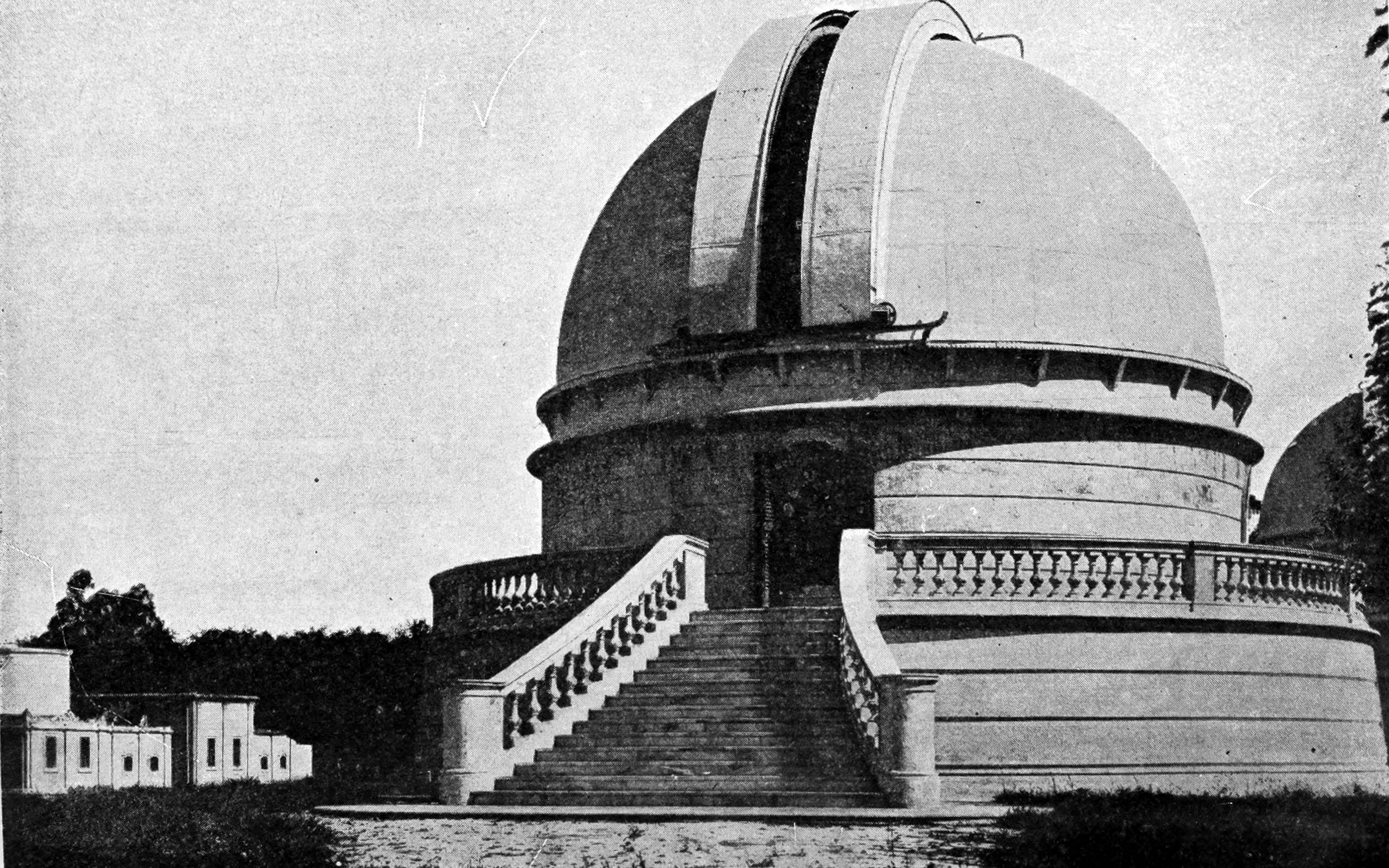
The observatory in 1906

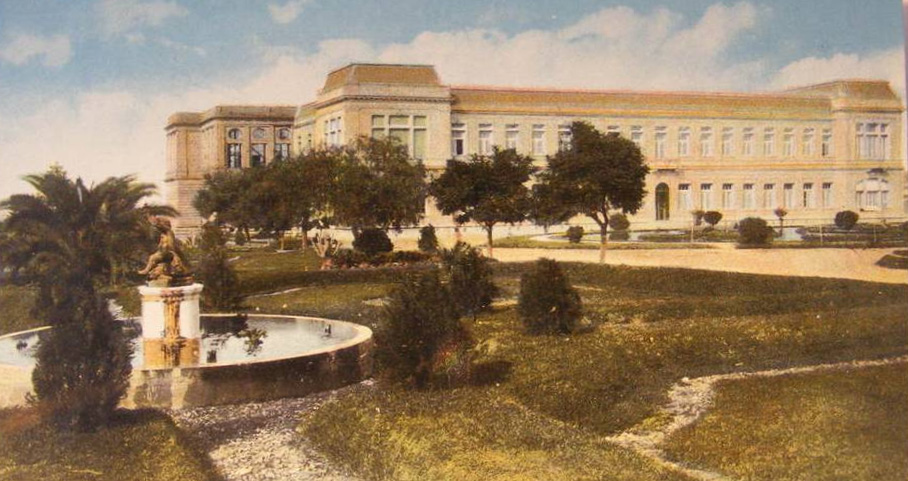
Faculty of Agronomy building c 191

On August 12 of that year the university and its faculties, the La Plata Museum, the La Plata Observatory, the Institute of Arts and Crafts, the University Library, the School and the Teachers' College were taken over by the national government. In the covenant of transfer, the Nation was obliged to found a university institute.

On August 15, the creation of the Universidad Nacional de La Plata was approved in the House of Representatives, and on August 19, it received definitive sanction in the National Senate. The bill was signed by President Manuel Quintana on September 25, and on March 17, 1906, the university's first leadership, headed by Joaquín V. González and university vice-president Agustín Alvarez, was elected.

In 1908 the national university was composed of the following faculties:

- A Faculty of Social and Legal Sciences, with a Department of Teaching and a Department of Philosophy and Letters.
- A Faculty of Agronomy and Veterinary Medicine (the one that the Regional School of Agriculture depended on) and the School of Stockbreeding of Santa Catalina.
- A Faculty of Physical Science, Mathematics, and Astronomy, which is divided into a School of Mathematical Sciences, a School of Physical Sciences, a School of Astronomical Sciences, a School of Architectural Engineering, and a School of Engineering Hydraulics.
- A Faculty of the Museum, (the one that the Faculty of Natural Sciences depended on), the Museum, the School of Chemistry and Pharmacy, the School of Physical Geography and the School of Drawing and Art.
- A Department of Primary and Secondary Studies, consisting of the National School, the Secondary School for Young Ladies and the Graduate School.
- A Library and the University Extension.
- An Astronomical Observatory, consisting of the Division of Seismology, the Division of Meteorology, and the Station of lengths of Oncativo.

It is recorded that the university had a student body of 1,845 students in 1908.

Joaquín V. González served four terms as president, retiring on March 18, 1918.

=== The era of university reform ===
University reform in Argentina was a movement that was initiated at the National University of Córdoba in 1918. It sought various changes to the Argentine university system, including free university education, student participation in the administrative bodies of the university, autonomy, curricular flexibility, and university extension. These were to become the pillars of an ideology that spread throughout the universities of Argentina, as well as many others in Latin America.

The National University of La Plata had been founded with a strong impulse for university extension which had developed, in its early years, into the form of systematic programs of conferences and courses that were open to the general public. Nevertheless, in other aspects related to the reform movements, its position was a source of controversies. In March 1918 Rodolfo Rivarola took charge of the university. One of the opponents of his election, José Nicolás Matienzo (who would later become Attorney General of Argentina) said about the reform of the Statutes in 1920: "Examining the proposed reforms to the statutes of the National University of La Plata, I believe that amongst all the universities of the republic, this is the one that has endured the most oligarchic regime until now.". His criticism centered principally on the excessive decision-making power of the president, the excessively long mandates, the possibility of undefined elections and the lack of participation in the designation of instructors.

The events of Córdoba had little impact in La Plata that year, with the exception of the proposal by the University Federation carried out in July 1918 on the teaching conditions in the Faculty of Agronomy and Veterinary Medicine. Nevertheless, beneath this calm façade was brewing an intense movement that was reflected in the pages of the student magazines Atenea of the National School, and Renovación of the University Federation.

In early 1919, the Upper Council approved the participation of members of the student body in the government of the university by a voice vote. On 20 October of that year, a strike broke out in the entire university, ignited by the resurgence of the conflict in the Faculty of Agronomy and Veterinary Medicine. At the beginning of 1920, after a ferocious crackdown on a student rally in March, the conflict turned violent, culminating in the murder of the student David Viera during an examination in the School of Medical Sciences. In the meantime, a strong rivalry exploded between opposing student factions: the reformers in the University Federation of La Plata and the University Concentration group.

On June 5 President Rivarola tendered his resignation, which was accepted by Carlos Melo. In the meantime, Professor Alejandro Korn, a member of the Upper Council, became the most prominent representative of the reformist movement, carrying out some of the demands of the student body, such as the closure of the boarding school of the university which the students considered to be a source of favoritism and nepotism.

Student activism staged a return during the university presidency of Nazar Anchorena, from 1921 to 1927. Despite not having achieved significant changes, it maintained the ideals of reform through the group Renovación (Renewal), named after its goal of transforming the Federation of the University of La Plata. The federation had at this time become more commonly known by the initials, FULP (Federación Universitaria de La Plata). The group was at the center of intense cultural campus activity. It was also the direct antecedent of what would become the university's theater group and the magazine Valoraciones (Appraisals). The latter would become a venue of expression for the reformer Alejandro Korn and such professors as Pedro Henríquez Ureña. During this period, the radio station LR11 Radio University was created.

Between 1927 and 1930, the presidency was held by Ramón Loyarte and on December 1, 1930, the new president, Ricardo Levene, was elected. His tenure oversaw the turbulence produced by the coup d'état of General José Félix Uriburu, and lasted only six months.

The University of Buenos Aires was taken under state control after the coup d'état, with Nazar Anchorena, former president of University of La Plata as administrator. The student body of La Plata considered this a violation of university autonomy. The tension that was generated between the two universities concluded with the expulsion from the University of Buenos Aires of Levene, and of Gabriel del Mazo, dismissed for his loyalty to the overthrown UCR government. There was a student strike, and the Upper Council was abolished by governmental decree, upon which Levene and of all the counselors and deans of the faculties resigned.

The university was then "intervened" (that is, managed by a state-appointed president); extraordinary powers were bestowed upon Federico Walker, who declared his intention to exclude any opposing students, leading to the dismissal of 31 students and various professors. By August of that year, the new regime was well entrenched. During the so-called "infamous decade" (1931–1943), characterized by "patriotic (i.e., electoral) fraud", student participation was much restricted.

This enclosed opening was fought by students and educational, and despite those conditions Ramón Loyarte being was appointed as the president of the university January 14, 1932, in May from that year the pressure of the students and of the Upper Counsel forced it to renounce. Already the majority of the students and educational exclude you had been reincorporated the 17 March. On June 25, Dr. Levene was chosen with the support of the University.

In 1935 Julio Castiñeiras took office as the university's president, and in that era the Association of Mutual Aid for the students was created. The company was subsidized by the university and by the students that offered health care and dental services, as well as a community kitchen and a pharmacy. Also in this era a strong dispute between the conduction of the university arose, and the governor of the Province, Manuel Fresco, arose; Fresco's sympathies lay with Italian fascism.

In 1938, Juan Carlos Rébora was appointed rector, succeeding Julio Castiñeiras. In that year the number of students reached 9,443. The start of World War II generated strong tensions within the institution, because the politics of neutrality did not allow political demonstrations by public and students. On June 27, 1941, Alfredo Palacios became president. He urged a return to the foundational view of Joaquín V. González, whereby university institutes and faculties were organized as in a sort of "federal republic", while allowing for synergy and a degree of integration across disciplines. That vision is reflected in a university by a law that mandated: 1) studies of philosophy for all the graduates in the sciences; 2) the development of a series of courses that could provide a historic and ideological background common to may disciplines. These initiatives were eventually abandoned in 1943 during the management of Ricardo de Labougle, leading to an increasing fragmentation.

During the era that began with the coup d'état of 4 June 1943, some renewal took place, leading to the creation of the Institute of Theatre, the Commission of Fonografía Cultural, and the Latin American Institute. During that time, the Samay Huasi (House of Rest) was incorporated as patrimony of the university.

=== The limitation of university autonomy (1943–1955) ===
In 1943 to 1945 there was a common denominator for all the national universities: the tension between the de facto government and the reformist sectors that would conform later to the Democratic Union. In October 1943 the administration of Alfredo Palacios was interrupted due to his opposition to decrees issued by the National Executive.

From 1952 to 1955 the college was called Eva Perón National University, when the city of La Plata was renamed Eva Perón City.

== Artistic extension ==
=== The choirs ===
The University Choir of the National University of La Plata was the university's first artistic group which was brought about through student initiative and was the first one in its kind in Argentina. Its debut took place on 19 September 1942 under the direction of the maestro Rodolfo Kubik.

The choir's motto is "Friendship through Music" and since its inception, it has encouraged the creation of other university choirs. The First La Plata Festival of University Choirs was organized in 1959, thus initiating a tradition that is maintained to the present time.

The choir's repertoire includes classical works, religious music of the 16th century, popular Argentinian folk or contemporary music (with works by composers such as Carlos Guastavino, Atahualpa Yupanqui, Ástor Piazzolla, Eladia Blázquez), Latin-American music and negro spirituals.

Throughout the years, the choir has undertaken many tours including a cycle of concerts in cities along the East Coast of the United States in 1965, in which the choir was invited to take part in the inauguration of the Lincoln Center of New York; a tour of European cities in 1970 with performances in Rome, Paris, Munich, Vienna and Frankfurt; its participation in the 1995 International Music Festival of Cantonigròs; and its 2000 participation in the International Festival of Choir Music "America Cantat III" in Caracas.

The Coro Juvenil (Youth Choir) was created in September 1983, and is now conducted by Mtro. Pablo Cánaves. It has received several prizes, and its repertoire ranges from Renaissance music to contemporary music and popular folksongs.

The Chamber Choir was created in 1985. Its objectives are: the musical and professional preparation of youths who aspire to sing professionally; the featuring of soloists and instrumental ensembles; and an emphasis on the musical literature of the 20th century. It is conducted by Mtro. Roberto Ruiz.

=== The String Quartet ===
The University String Quartet (Cuarteto de Cuerdas) was created in 1953 by professors of the College of Fine Arts. Its first concert took place at the Salón Dorado of the municipality of La Plata on October 5 of that year. The NU of LP formalized the status of the ensemble in 1958. The quartet has premiered the works of distinguished Argentinian composers such as Alberto Ginastera, Ástor Piazzolla, Gerardo Gandini and Eduardo Alemann. Its repertoire ranges from classical to the present day.

Its current members are:

- 1st Violin: José Bondar
- 2nd Violin: Fernando Favero
- Viola: Roberto Regio
- Cello: Siro Bellisomi

=== The wind quintet ===
The Wind Quintet of the NU of LP was created in 1979 as an instrumental ensemble of the university's radio station.

In 1982 the NU of LP officialized it as its own. The Wind Quintet plays, amongst much else, classical music for the public

Its repertoire covers composers of the romantic, classical, 20th-century and contemporary composers, which also includes folk and popular works.

As of 2005, its members are:

- Marcelo Mancuso (flute)
- Cristian Cocchiararo (oboe)
- Roberto Palomo (clarinet)
- Calos Nalli, (horn)
- Eduardo Rodriguez (bassoon)

=== University theater ===
The Theatre Workshop of the National University of La Plata was created on May 5, 1986. Its stated objective is to promote artistic creativity and research on aesthetics. The group is devoted to experimental productions open to the general public, as well as providing advice and consultancy on various artistic disciplines. The workshop can trace its roots to the theatre group termed "Renewal", associated with the reformist movement of the 1920s.

== Academic units ==
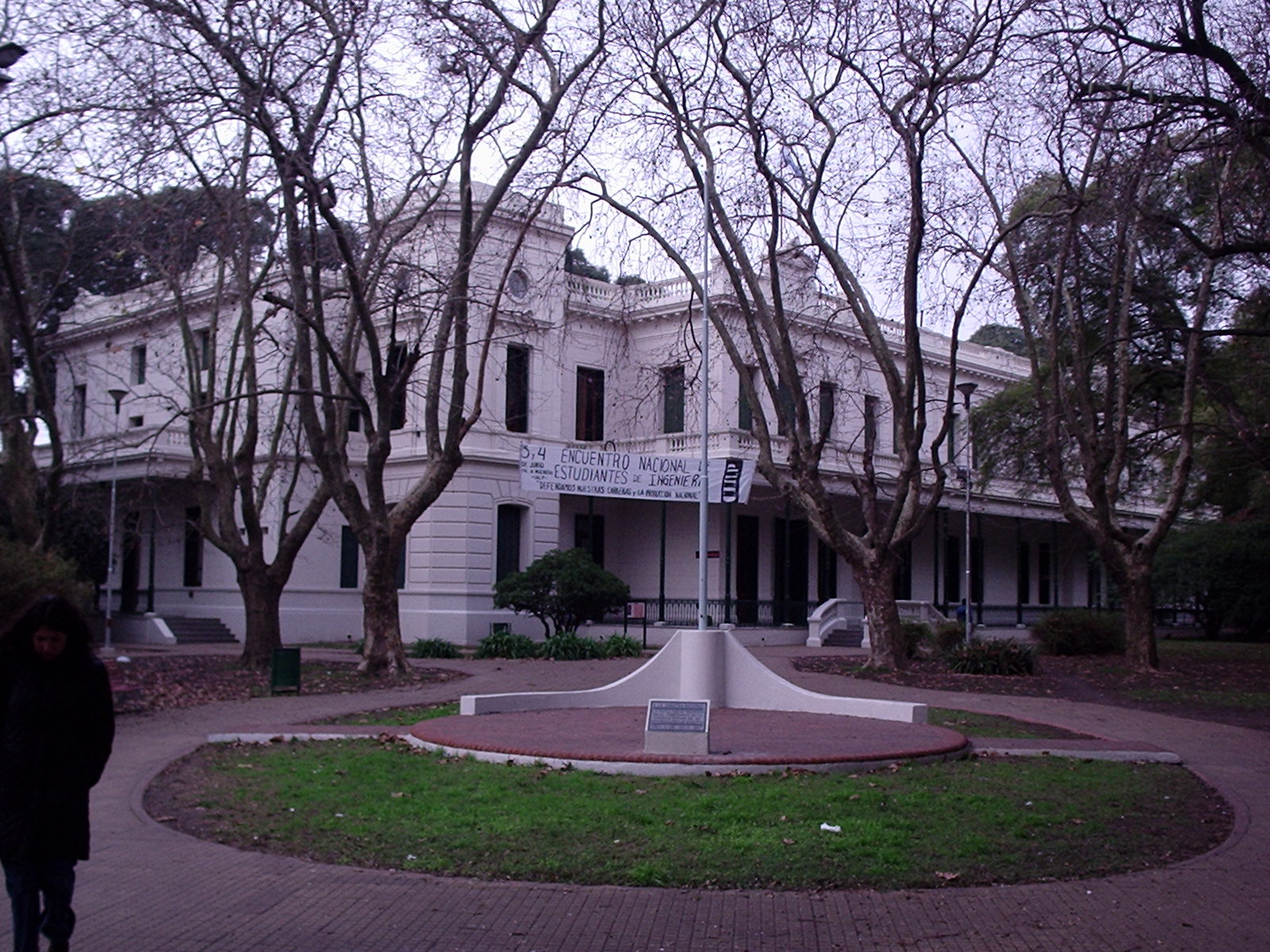
The School of Engineering

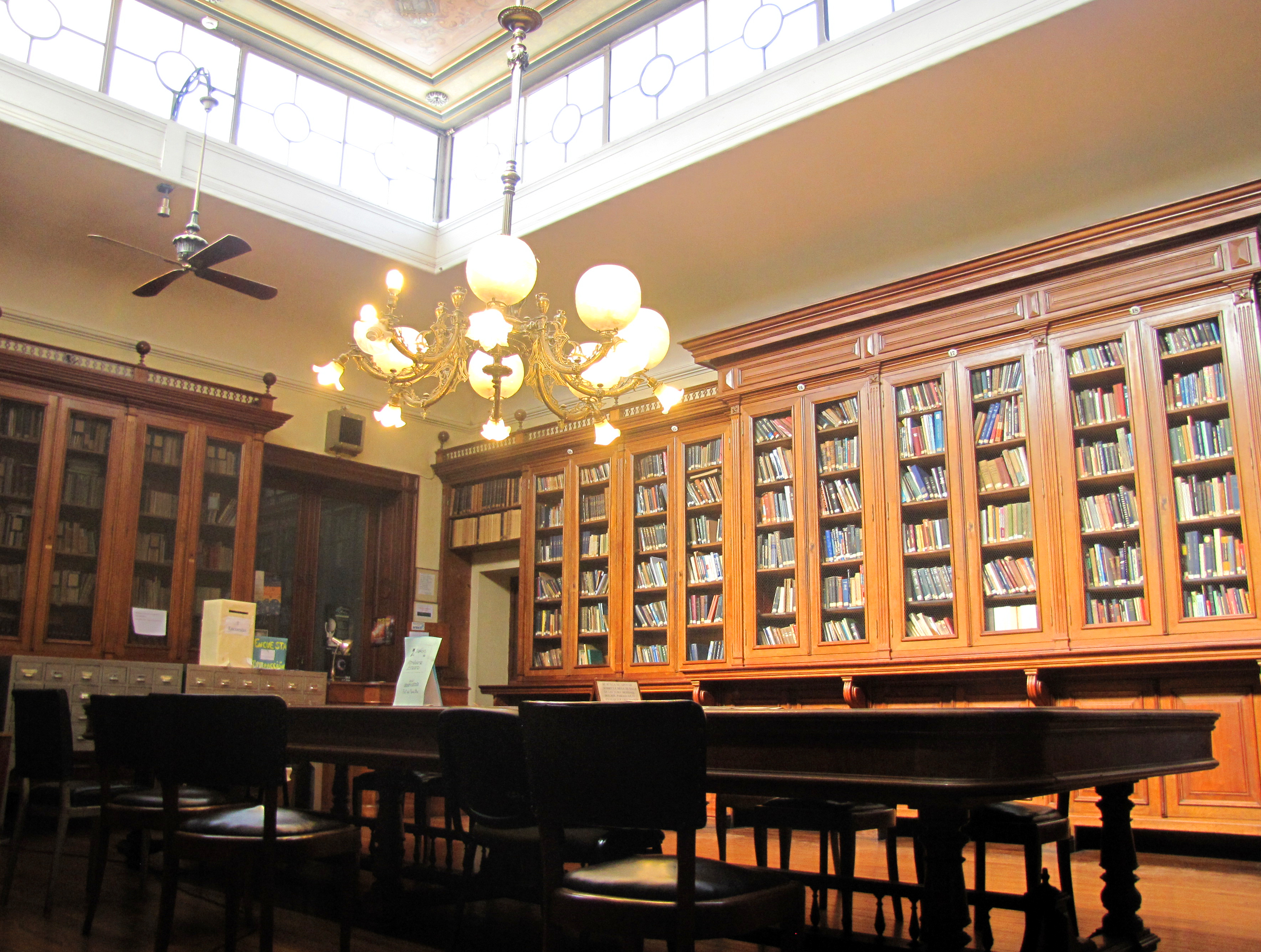
Library of the observatory

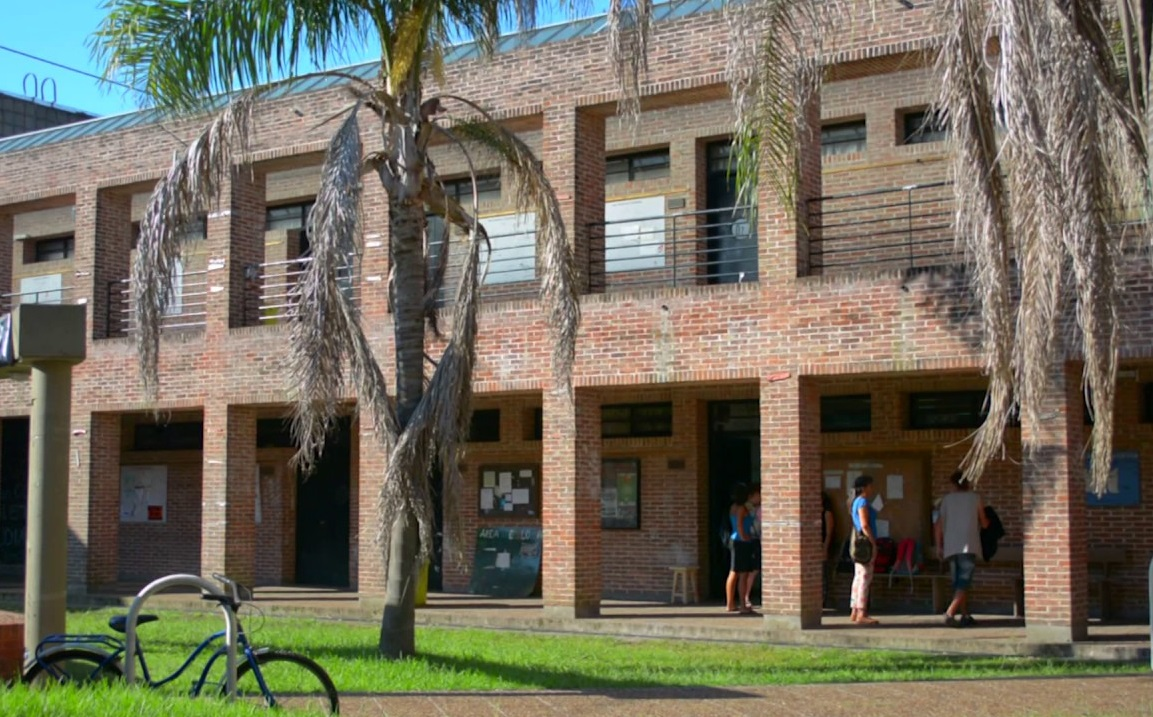
Faculty of Natural sciences

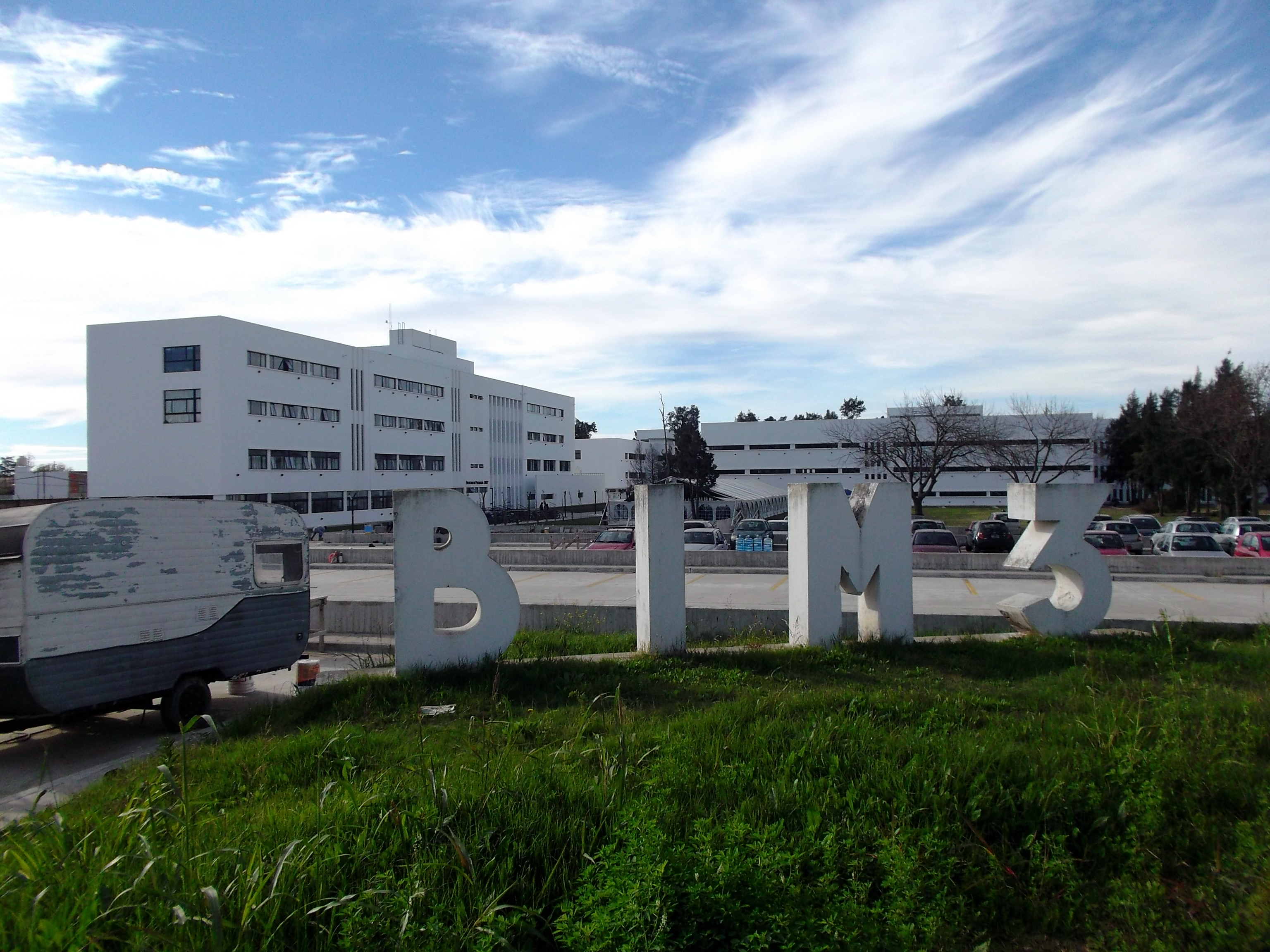
Bosque Norte Group

- Faculty of Architecture and Urbanism
- Faculty of Arts
- Faculty of Agriculture and Forestry
- Faculty of Astronomic and Geophysic Sciences
- Faculty of Economic Sciences
- Faculty of Exact Sciences
- Faculty of Law and Social Sciences
- Faculty of Medical Sciences
- Faculty of Natural Sciences and Museum
- Faculty of Veterinary Sciences
- Faculty of Humanities and Education Sciences
- Faculty of Informatics
- Faculty of Engineering
- Faculty of Dentistry
- Faculty of Psychology
- Faculty of Journalism and Social Communication
- Faculty of Social Work
- Fine Arts High School "Professor Francisco Américo de Santo"
- Institute of Physics (founded 1905)

== Campus ==
- West Forest group: Faculty of Engineering, Faculty of Architecture and Urbanism, Faculty of Exact Sciences, Faculty of Dentistry, Faculty of Computer Science, Rafael Hernández National College, Graduated School Joaquín V. González.
- East Forest group: Faculty of Medical Sciences, Faculty of Natural Sciences and Museum, Faculty of Journalism and Social Communication, Faculty of Veterinary Sciences, Faculty of Agriculture and Forestry.
- North Forest group: Memory House, Faculty of Humanities and Education, Physical Education Department, Faculty of Psychology.
- Center Forest group: Faculty of Astronomic and Geophysical Sciences, Planetarium.
- Center Urban group: Faculty of Economic Sciences, Faculty of Law and Social, Faculty of Arts, Fine Arts High School.

== Symbols ==
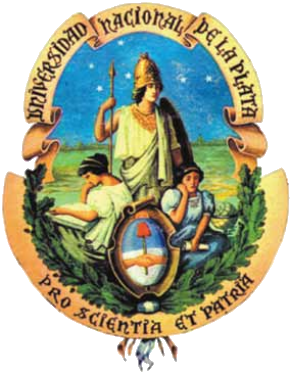
Historic coat of arms, proposed by Dardo Rocha in 1897 and promulgated in the 1960s

The university coat of arms was adopted at the first university assembly on 14 February 1897. It represents the City of La Plata holding up the "Light of Science". The constellation of the Southern Cross is also featured, as well as the coat of arms of the Province of Buenos Aires, which is held in the hands of the woman who represents the city. The university emblem is the oak leaf. Its motto "Pro Scientia et Patria" is a Latin phrase meaning For Science and the Motherland.

The university hymn was composed by Carlos López Buchardo, and its lyrics were written by Arturo Capdevilla. The hymn premiered on 23 October 1927 in the Teatro Argentino of La Plata to commemorate the centenary of the death of Ludwig van Beethoven. It was performed by the orchestra of the Colón Theater of Buenos Aires under the direction of Adolfo Morpurgo, a professor in the School of Fine Arts.

== Notable alumni and staff ==
- Maria Asensio – Spanish-Argentinian physical chemist, academic, researcher, and author
- Raúl Alfonsín (Law degree in 1950) – President of Argentina (1983–1989)
- Florentino Ameghino (professor of geology)
- Adolfo Pérez Esquivel (Nobel Peace Prize laureate)
- Juan José Arévalo (Philosophy PhD in 1934)
- Felicitas Arias (Astronomy degree in 1976) – worked at International Bureau of Weights and Measures
- Amina Helmi (MsC in Astronomy) - Astronomer, after whom the Helmi stream is named. Winner of the 2026 Kavli Price in Astrophysics.
- Mario Bunge (Physics-Mathematics PhD in 1952)
- Marta Cohen, pediatric pathologist, researcher and academic
- Estela Beatriz Cols (1965-2010), pedagogue, researcher, and educator
- Genoveva Dawson (1918–2012), botanist, professor
- René Favaloro (Medicine degree in 1949) – inventor of the coronary artery bypass
- Beatriz Ghirelli, the first woman to graduate as a Mechanical and Electrical Engineer in 1938.
- Evelia Edith Oyhenart (Professor of biological anthropology)
- Julio Palmaz (Medicine degree in 1971) – inventor of the balloon-expandable stent
- Emilio Pettoruti - Painter
- Raúl A. Ringuelet (Professor of Zoology)
- Carlos Saavedra Lamas (law teacher) – rector, Nobel Peace Prize laureate
- Ernesto Sábato (Physics PhD in 1937) – writer
- Néstor Kirchner (Law degree in 1976) – president of Argentina (2003–2007)
- Cristina Fernández de Kirchner (Law degree in 1979) – president of Argentina (2007–2015) and former Vice President of Argentina (2019–2023)
- Florentina Gómez Miranda (Law degree in 1945) – Argentine deputy from 1983 to 1991
- Horacio Pagani (Industrial design) – CEO of the automotive company Pagani Automobili S.p.A.
- Maevia Noemí Correa (1953, PhD, Natural Sciences)
- Ricardo Piglia (author)
- Héctor Magnetto (CEO of Clarín Group)
- María Luisa Aguilar – (Astronomer)
- Juana Cortelezzi (Professor of Geology) – first woman full professor at UNLP
- Carlota Sempé, archaeologist
- Martín Almada – Paraguayan human rights activist notable for uncovering the Archives of Terror

== See also ==
- List of universities in Argentina
- Science and technology in Argentina
- University Revolution

=== Bibliography ===
- History of the University of La Plata (Historia de la Universidad de La Plata), Julio Castiñeira, Universidad Nacional de La Plata.
- National University of La Plata on the Centennial of its Nationalization (La Universidad Nacional de La Plata en el centenario de su nacionalización), Universidad Nacional de La Plata.
