= 2011 in Argentina =

- Decades: 1990s; 2000s; 2010s; 2020s; 2030s
- See also: Other events of 2011; List of years in Argentina

Events from the year 2011 in Argentina.

== Incumbents ==
- President: Cristina Fernández de Kirchner
- Vice President: Julio Cobos

=== Governors ===
- Governor of Buenos Aires Province: Daniel Scioli
- Governor of Catamarca Province: Eduardo Brizuela del Moral (until 10 December); Lucía Corpacci (starting 10 December)
- Governor of Chaco Province: Juan Carlos Bacileff Ivanoff
- Governor of Chubut Province:
  - Mario Das Neves (until 10 December)
  - Martín Buzzi (from 10 December)
- Governor of Córdoba:
  - Juan Schiaretti (until 10 December)
  - José Manuel De la Sota (from 10 December)
- Governor of Corrientes Province: Ricardo Colombi
- Governor of Entre Ríos Province: Sergio Urribarri
- Governor of Formosa Province: Gildo Insfrán
- Governor of Jujuy Province:
  - Walter Barrionuevo (until 10 December)
  - Eduardo Fellner (from 10 December)
- Governor of La Pampa Province: Oscar Jorge (until 10 December); Celso Jaque (starting 10 December)
- Governor of La Rioja Province: Luis Beder Herrera
- Governor of Mendoza Province: Francisco Pérez
- Governor of Misiones Province: Maurice Closs
- Governor of Neuquén Province: Jorge Sapag
- Governor of Río Negro Province: Miguel Saiz (until 10 December); Carlos Ernesto Soria (starting 10 December)
- Governor of Salta Province: Juan Manuel Urtubey
- Governor of San Juan Province: José Luis Gioja
- Governor of San Luis Province: Alberto Rodríguez Saá (until 23 December); Claudio Poggi (starting 23 December)
- Governor of Santa Cruz Province: Daniel Peralta
- Governor of Santa Fe Province:
  - Hermes Binner (until 11 December)
  - Antonio Bonfatti (from 11 December)
- Governor of Santiago del Estero: Gerardo Zamora
- Governor of Tierra del Fuego: Fabiana Ríos
- Governor of Tucumán: José Alperovich

=== Vice Governors ===
- Vice Governor of Buenos Aires Province: Alberto Balestrini (until 10 December); Gabriel Mariotto (starting 10 December)
- Vice Governor of Catamarca Province: Marta Grimaux (until 10 December); Dalmacio Mera (starting 10 December)
- Vice Governor of Chaco Province: Juan Carlos Bacileff Ivanoff
- Vice Governor of Corrientes Province: Pedro Braillard Poccard
- Vice Governor of Entre Rios Province: José Lauritto (until 10 December); José Orlando Cáceres (starting 10 December)
- Vice Governor of Formosa Province: Floro Bogado
- Vice Governor of Jujuy Province: Pedro Segura (until 10 December); Guillermo Jenefes (starting 10 December)
- Vice Governor of La Pampa Province: Luis Alberto Campo (until 10 December); Norma Durango (starting 10 December)
- Vice Governor of La Rioja Province: Teresita Luna (until 10 December); Sergio Casas (starting 10 December)
- Vice Governor of Misiones Province: Sandra Giménez (until 10 December); Hugo Passalacqua (starting 10 December)
- Vice Governor of Neuquén Province: Ana Pechen
- Vice Governor of Rio Negro Province: Bautista Mendioroz (until 10 December); Alberto Weretilneck (starting 10 December)
- Vice Governor of Salta Province: Andrés Zottos
- Vice Governor of San Juan Province: Rubén Uñac (until 10 December); Sergio Uñac (starting 10 December)
- Vice Governor of San Luis Province: Jorge Luis Pellegrini (until 10 December); Jorge Raúl Díaz (starting 10 December)
- Vice Governor of Santa Cruz: Luis Martínez Crespo (until 10 December); Fernando Cotillo (starting 10 December)
- Vice Governor of Santa Fe Province: Griselda Tessio (until 10 December); Jorge Henn (starting 10 December)
- Vice Governor of Santiago del Estero: Ángel Niccolai
- Vice Governor of Tierra del Fuego: Carlos Basanetti (until 10 December); Roberto Crocianelli (starting 10 December)

== Events ==
=== March ===
- Lucía Corpacci wins the elections for governor of Catamarca.
- The elections for governor of Chubut end in a technical tie; the candidate Carlos Eliceche denounced electoral fraud. Mario Das Neves, governor of Chubut, declines his candidature to the 2011 presidential elections.
- The judiciary of Suiza requests information about truck union leader Hugo Moyano. Moyano calls for a massive strike.

=== April ===
- Julio Cobos declines his candidature to run for the presidency of Argentina. Ernesto Sanz does the same a pair of weeks later. Thus, Ricardo Alfonsín is appointed candidate to the presidency for the Radical Civic Union.

=== May ===
- Mauricio Macri declines his candidature to run for the presidency of Argentina, running instead for reelection as mayor of Buenos Aires.
- Cristina Fernández choose Daniel Filmus to run for mayor of Buenos Aires.
- A show of the rock band La Renga ends with a death caused by pyrotechnic flare.

=== June ===
- River Plate lost a two-ledged match against Belgrano, being relegated to the National B tournament. The second match ends with a massive riot at the Monumental.

=== July ===
- Mauricio Macri runs for reelection as mayor of Buenos Aires, getting nearly 47% of the vote. The results call for a runoff election against Daniel Filmus, the second candidate, who got the 27% of the vote.
- Socialist Antonio Bonfatti becomes governor of Santa Fe. Miguel del Sel gets an unexpected second place in the election, leaving the kirchnerist candidate Agustín Rossi in the third place.
- In the Noble siblings case, Marcela and Felipe Noble Herrera (adoptive sons of Ernestina Herrera de Noble) accepted a DNA profiling against a database of disappeared women during the Dirty War. All results are negative, confirming that they were not sons of disappeared women.
- Argentina hosts the 2011 Copa América. The Argentina national football team, however, is defeated early, in a penalty shoot-out against Uruguay.

== Deaths ==
- January 4 – Gustavo Kupinski, 36, guitarist
- January 10 – María Elena Walsh, 80, musician, poet and writer
- January 12 – Clemar Bucci, 90, racing driver
- February 1 – Julio Barragán, 82, painter
- February 2 – Daniela Castelo, 47, journalist and radio host
- February 20 – Noemí Simonetto de Portela, 85, athlete
- March 5 – Alberto Granado, 88, Argentine-born biochemist and companion of Che Guevara
- March 10 – David Viñas, dramatist, critic, and novelist
- March 12 – Shifra Lerer, 95, Argentine-born actress
- March 20 – Néstor de Vicente, 46, footballer
- March 25 – Hugo Midón, 67, children's literature writer
- April 20 – Osvaldo Miranda, 95, actor
- April 30 – Ernesto Sábato, 99, writer and physicist
- May 6 – Rolo Puente, 71, actor
- May 8 – Carlos Trillo, 68, comic book writer
- June 22 – Carmelo Juan Giaquinta, 81, archbishop
- July 7 – José Carlos Martínez, 48, politician
- July 9 – Facundo Cabral, 74, singer
- July 16 – Ante Garmaz, 83, actor, fashion designer and model
- August 1 – Florentina Gómez Miranda, 99, teacher and lawyer
- August 12 – Francisco Solano López, 83, comic book artist
- August 15 – Hugo Perié, 67, politician
- August 21 – Ezra Sued, 88, footballer
- November 24 – Antonio Domingo Bussi, 85, military

== See also ==
- List of Argentine films of 2011
