= 2014 in Argentina =

- Decades: 1990s; 2000s; 2010s; 2020s; 2030s
- See also: Other events of 2014; List of years in Argentina

The following lists events from the year 2014 in Argentina.

== Incumbents ==
- President: Cristina Fernández de Kirchner
- Vice President: Amado Boudou

=== Governors ===
- Governor of Buenos Aires Province: Daniel Scioli
- Governor of Catamarca Province: Lucía Corpacci
- Governor of Chaco Province: Juan Carlos Bacileff Ivanoff
- Governor of Chubut Province: Martín Buzzi
- Governor of Córdoba: José Manuel De la Sota
- Governor of Corrientes Province: Ricardo Colombi
- Governor of Entre Ríos Province: Sergio Urribarri
- Governor of Formosa Province: Gildo Insfrán
- Governor of Jujuy Province: Eduardo Fellner
- Governor of La Pampa Province: Oscar Jorge
- Governor of La Rioja Province: Luis Beder Herrera
- Governor of Mendoza Province: Francisco Pérez
- Governor of Misiones Province: Maurice Closs
- Governor of Neuquén Province: Jorge Sapag
- Governor of Río Negro Province: Alberto Weretilneck
- Governor of Salta Province: Juan Manuel Urtubey
- Governor of San Juan Province: José Luis Gioja
- Governor of San Luis Province: Claudio Poggi
- Governor of Santa Cruz Province: Daniel Peralta
- Governor of Santa Fe Province: Antonio Bonfatti
- Governor of Santiago del Estero: Claudia Ledesma Abdala
- Governor of Tierra del Fuego: Fabiana Ríos
- Governor of Tucumán: José Alperovich

=== Vice Governors ===
- Vice Governor of Buenos Aires Province: Gabriel Mariotto
- Vice Governor of Catamarca Province: Dalmacio Mera
- Vice Governor of Chaco Province: Vacant
- Vice Governor of Corrientes Province: Gustavo Canteros
- Vice Governor of Entre Rios Province: José Orlando Cáceres
- Vice Governor of Formosa Province: Floro Bogado
- Vice Governor of Jujuy Province: Guillermo Jenefes
- Vice Governor of La Pampa Province: Norma Durango
- Vice Governor of La Rioja Province: Sergio Casas
- Vice Governor of Misiones Province: Hugo Passalacqua
- Vice Governor of Neuquén Province: Ana Pechen
- Vice Governor of Rio Negro Province: Carlos Peralta
- Vice Governor of Salta Province: Andrés Zottos
- Vice Governor of San Juan Province: Sergio Uñac
- Vice Governor of San Luis Province: Jorge Raúl Díaz
- Vice Governor of Santa Cruz: Fernando Cotillo
- Vice Governor of Santa Fe Province: Jorge Henn
- Vice Governor of Santiago del Estero: José Emilio Neder
- Vice Governor of Tierra del Fuego: Roberto Crocianelli

== Events ==
=== January ===
- January 24 - Restrictions enacted two years earlier on retail purchases of U.S. dollars were eased following a 15% drop in the Argentine peso days earlier.

=== February ===
- February 8 - A truck and a bus collide in the Argentine province of Mendoza, killing at least 17 people and injuring more than 10 others.
- February 17 - The Vatican head of state, Pope Francis, renews his Argentine passport, reportedly asking not to enjoy any privilege.

=== March ===
- March 17 - President Cristina Fernández de Kirchner visited Pope Francis at the Vatican; it was their third meeting.
- March 26 - Two new terminals at Buenos Aires' Jorge Newbery Airfield, the nation's busiest airport, were inaugurated, effectively doubling the airport's passenger capacity.

=== April ===
- April 10 - Massive general strike led by Dissident CGT heads Hugo Moyano and Luis Barrionuevo, and Dissident CTA head Pablo Micheli.
- April 22 - Broad Front UNEN, a center-left political coalition, was established following a convention in Buenos Aires' Broadway Theater.

=== May ===
- May 1 - Siam Di Tella's manufacturing plant in the Buenos Aires suburb of Piñeiro, once the largest appliance factory in South America, was reopened by local household electronics maker Newsan after 28 years.
- May 7 - Singer/songwriter Teresa Parodi was appointed the nation's first Minister of Culture following the president's decision to promote the Culture Secretariat to a cabinet-level ministry.
- May 16 - Announcement made of a new species of Titanosaur discovered in Patagonia, the largest land animal found to date
- May 29 - An agreement was reached with the Paris Club of creditor nations (the last remaining Argentine debt still in default besides bonds held by holdouts) on debt repayment totaling US$9 billion including penalties and interest.

=== June ===
- June 27 - Vice President Amado Boudou was indicted on passive bribery and influence peddling charges; Boudou appealed the indictment on July 10, alleging malicious prosecution.

=== July ===
- July 13 - Germany defeated Argentina by 1–0 in the 2014 FIFA World Cup Final.
- July 12 - Russian President Vladimir Putin and Chinese General Secretary Xi Jinping made official state visits to Argentina, during which a number of significant cultural and commercial agreements were signed.
- July 30 - Payments to bondholders with US$13 billion in New York-issued Argentine government bonds were stopped by District Court Judge Thomas Griesa at the behest of holdouts led by Paul Singer of Cayman Islands-based vulture fund NML Capital Limited; Argentine bonds issued under Buenos Aires and European Law were not affected.

=== August ===
- August 5 - Estela Barnes de Carlotto, President of the Association of Grandmothers of the Plaza de Mayo, announced that her long-lost grandson Guido (illegally placed for adoption at birth by his parents' military abductors during the Dirty War) had been discovered after he came forward for a DNA test.
- August 30 - ARSAT-1, the first geostationary satellite to be fully produced domestically, was unveiled, making Argentina only of only eight countries in the world to have done so.

== Deaths ==
- January 2: Horacio Fargosi, 87, President of the Buenos Aires Stock Exchange
- January 5: Eugenia de Chikoff, 94, etiquette writer
- January 14: Juan Gelman, 83, poet
- January 25: Emanuel Saldaño, 28, cyclist
- January 28: Jorge Obeid, 66, Senator from Santa Fe Province
- February 20: Jorge Polaco, 67, film maker
- March 9: Carlos Moreno, 75, actor
- March 14: Jorge Ibáñez, 44, fashion designer
- April 11: Alfredo Alcón, 84, actor
- April 12: Carlos Peralta, 50, Vice Governor of Río Negro Province
- April 13: Ernesto Laclau, 78, political scientist
- April 15: Eliseo Verón, 78, sociologist
- April 24: Ricardo Bauleo, 67, actor
- April 29: Norma Pons, 71, actress
- May 5: Eduardo Mac Entyre, 85, painter
- May 10: Carmen Argibay, 74, Argentine Supreme Court Justice
- May 10: Miguel Brascó, 87, food and wine critic
- May 10: Andrés Carrasco, 67, discovered adverse effects of glyphosate (Monsanto Roundup)
- June 3: Virginia Luque, 86, Tango singer
- June 9: Danilo Baroni, 92, former Governor of Chaco Province
- June 30: Alejandra Da Passano, 66, actress
- July 6: Rogelio Polesello, 75, sculptor
- July 6: Ernesto Ueltschi, 92, former Governor of Mendoza Province
- July 7: Alfredo Di Stéfano, 88, football forward
- July 9: Alberto Cassano, 79, nuclear engineer
- July 28: Iris Scaccheri, 64, choreographer
- July 30: Julio Grondona, 82, President of the Argentine Football Association
- July 31: Jorge Jacobson, 78, journalist
- August 7: Víctor Fayad, 59, Mayor of Mendoza
- August 9: Leonardo Moledo, 67, mathematician and writer
- August 12: Abel Laudonio, 75, boxer
- August 14: Mariana Briski, 48, actress
- August 16: Pascual Mastellone, 84, Chairman of La Serenísima
- August 20: Eduardo Moliné O'Connor, 76, former Supreme Court Justice
- September 4: Gustavo Cerati, 55, musician
- September 17: China Zorrilla, 92, actress
- September 21: Cecilia Cenci, 72, actress
- November 17: Omar Chabán, 62, nightclub owner
- December 21: Horacio Ferrer, 81, Uruguay-born poet and composer

== See also ==
- List of Argentine films of 2014
