= 2015 in Argentina =

- Decades: 1990s; 2000s; 2010s; 2020s; 2030s
- See also: Other events of 2015; List of years in Argentina

The following lists events that happened during 2015 in Argentina.

== Incumbents ==
- President: Cristina Fernández de Kirchner (until 10 December) – Mauricio Macri
- Vice president: Amado Boudou (until 10 December) – Gabriela Michetti

=== Governors ===
- Governor of Buenos Aires Province:
  - Daniel Scioli (until 10 December)
  - María Eugenia Vidal (from 10 December)
- Governor of Catamarca Province: Lucía Corpacci
- Governor of Chaco Province:
  - until 27 February: Juan Carlos Bacileff Ivanoff
  - 27 February-10 December: Jorge Capitanich
  - starting 10 December: Domingo Peppo
- Governor of Chubut Province: Martín Buzzi (until 10 December); Mario Das Neves (starting 10 December)
- Governor of Córdoba: José Manuel De la Sota (until 10 December); Juan Schiaretti (starting 10 December)
- Governor of Corrientes Province: Ricardo Colombi
- Governor of Entre Ríos Province: Sergio Urribarri (until 10 December); Gustavo Bordet (starting 10 December)
- Governor of Formosa Province: Gildo Insfrán
- Governor of Jujuy Province: Eduardo Fellner (until 10 December); Gerardo Morales (starting 10 December)
- Governor of La Pampa Province: Oscar Jorge (until 10 December); Carlos Verna (starting 10 December)
- Governor of La Rioja Province: Luis Beder Herrera (until 10 December); Sergio Casas (starting 10 December)
- Governor of Mendoza Province: Francisco Pérez (until 10 December); Alfredo Cornejo (starting 10 December)
- Governor of Misiones Province: Maurice Closs (until 10 December); Hugo Passalacqua (starting 10 December)
- Governor of Neuquén Province: Jorge Sapag (until 10 December); Omar Gutiérrez (starting 10 December)
- Governor of Río Negro Province: Alberto Weretilneck
- Governor of Salta Province: Juan Manuel Urtubey
- Governor of San Juan Province: José Luis Gioja (until 10 December); Sergio Uñac (starting 10 December)
- Governor of San Luis Province: Claudio Poggi (until 10 December); Alberto Rodríguez Saá (starting 10 December)
- Governor of Santa Cruz Province: Daniel Peralta (until 10 December); Alicia Kirchner (starting 10 December)
- Governor of Santa Fe Province: Antonio Bonfatti (until 10 December); Miguel Lifschitz (starting 10 December)
- Governor of Santiago del Estero: Claudia Ledesma Abdala
- Governor of Tierra del Fuego: Fabiana Ríos (until 10 December); Rosana Bertone (starting 10 December)
- Governor of Tucumán: José Alperovich (until 29 October); Juan Luis Manzur (starting 29 October)

=== Vice Governors ===
- Vice Governor of Buenos Aires Province: Gabriel Mariotto (until 29 October); Daniel Salvador (starting 29 October)
- Vice Governor of Catamarca Province: Dalmacio Mera (until 10 December); Octavio Gutiérrez (starting 10 December)
- Vice Governor of Chaco Province:
  - until 27 February: Vacant
  - 27 February-10 December: Juan Carlos Bacileff Ivanoff
  - starting 10 December: Daniel Capitanich
- Vice Governor of Corrientes Province: Gustavo Canteros
- Vice Governor of Entre Rios Province: José Orlando Cáceres (until 10 December); Adán Bahl (starting 10 December)
- Vice Governor of Formosa Province: Floro Bogado
- Vice Governor of Jujuy Province: Guillermo Jenefes (until 10 December); Carlos Haquim (starting 10 December)
- Vice Governor of La Pampa Province: Norma Durango (until 10 December); Mariano Fernández (starting 10 December)
- Vice Governor of La Rioja Province: Sergio Casas (until 10 December); Néstor Bosetti (starting 10 December)
- Vice Governor of Misiones Province: Hugo Passalacqua (until 10 December); Oscar Herrera Ahuad (starting 10 December)
- Vice Governor of Neuquén Province: Ana Pechen (until 10 December); Rolando Figueroa (starting 10 December)
- Vice Governor of Rio Negro Province: Carlos Peralta (until 10 December); Pedro Pesatti (starting 10 December)
- Vice Governor of Salta Province: Andrés Zottos (until 10 December); Miguel Isa (starting 10 December)
- Vice Governor of San Juan Province: Sergio Uñac (until 10 December); Marcelo Lima (starting 10 December)
- Vice Governor of San Luis Province: Jorge Raúl Díaz (until 10 December); Carlos Ponce (starting 10 December)
- Vice Governor of Santa Cruz: Fernando Cotillo (until 10 December); Pablo González (starting 10 December)
- Vice Governor of Santa Fe Province: Jorge Henn (until 10 December); Carlos Fascendini (starting 10 December)
- Vice Governor of Santiago del Estero: José Emilio Neder
- Vice Governor of Tierra del Fuego: Roberto Crocianelli (until 10 December); Juan Carlos Arcando (starting 10 December)

== Events ==
=== January ===
- January 2: Alberto Kryvszuk, former mayor of El Soberbio and fugitive, gives himself up to the police.
- January 5: Héctor Eduardo Ruiz, former mayor of La Banda and fugitive, is captured by the police.
- January 8: A new law adds the election of the members to the Mercosur Parliament in the upcoming general elections.
- January 9: Judge Enrique Lavié Pico prevents the appointment of 16 kirchnerite prosecutors.
- January 11
  - Minister Héctor Timerman takes part in the Republican marches against the Charlie Hebdo shooting in France, despite the lack of presidential authorization.
  - Sergio Massa and Francisco de Narváez make an alliance for the general elections.
- January 14: Prosecutor Alberto Nisman denounces president Cristina Fernández de Kirchner and foreign minister Héctor Timerman of a plan to conceal the Iranian involvement in the 1994 AMIA Bombing. The Republican Proposal party summons him to Congress, to explain the denounce in full detail.
- January 18: Death of Alberto Nisman, prosecutor that investigated the AMIA Bombing.

=== February ===
- February 18 – The 18F demonstration takes place, a month after Nisman's death, still unresolved by then.

=== March ===
- March 1 – Cristina Kirchner opens the 2015 sessions of the Argentine Congress.
- March 9 – Two helicopters collide in mid-air in a remote area of northwestern Argentina leaving at least ten dead. Among the dead are a group of French sports stars participating in a reality-television show called Dropped.

=== June ===
- #NiUnaMenos massive demonstration against femicides.

=== October ===
- October 25 – The general elections are held.

=== December ===
- 10: Mauricio Macri takes office as the president of Argentina.

== Deaths ==
=== January ===
- January 18 - Alberto Nisman

=== February ===
- February 27 - Julio César Strassera

=== March ===
- March 8 - Gerardo Sofovich

=== June ===
- June 13 - Sergio Renán
- June 18 - Roberto M. Levingston
- June 25 - Alejandro Romay
- June 29 - Mario Losada

=== August ===
- August 21 - Ana Baron, journalist (b. 1950)

== See also ==
- List of Argentine films of 2015
