= 2008 in Argentina =

- Decades: 1980s; 1990s; 2000s; 2010s; 2020s
- See also: Other events of 2008; List of years in Argentina

Events in the year 2008 in Argentina.

== Incumbents ==
- President: Cristina Fernández de Kirchner
- Vice President: Julio Cobos

=== Governors ===
- Governor of Buenos Aires Province: Daniel Scioli
- Governor of Catamarca Province: Eduardo Brizuela del Moral
- Governor of Chaco Province: Jorge Capitanich
- Governor of Chubut Province: Mario Das Neves
- Governor of Córdoba: Juan Schiaretti
- Governor of Corrientes Province: Arturo Colombi
- Governor of Entre Ríos Province: Sergio Urribarri
- Governor of Formosa Province: Gildo Insfrán
- Governor of Jujuy Province: Walter Barrionuevo
- Governor of La Pampa Province: Oscar Jorge
- Governor of La Rioja Province: Luis Beder Herrera
- Governor of Mendoza Province: Francisco Pérez
- Governor of Misiones Province: Maurice Closs
- Governor of Neuquén Province: Jorge Sapag
- Governor of Río Negro Province: Miguel Saiz
- Governor of Salta Province: Juan Manuel Urtubey
- Governor of San Juan Province: José Luis Gioja
- Governor of San Luis Province: Alberto Rodríguez Saá
- Governor of Santa Cruz Province: Daniel Peralta
- Governor of Santa Fe Province: Hermes Binner
- Governor of Santiago del Estero: Gerardo Zamora
- Governor of Tierra del Fuego: Fabiana Ríos
- Governor of Tucumán: José Alperovich

=== Vice Governors ===
- Vice Governor of Buenos Aires Province: Alberto Balestrini
- Vice Governor of Catamarca Province: Marta Grimaux
- Vice Governor of Chaco Province: Juan Carlos Bacileff Ivanoff
- Vice Governor of Corrientes Province: Tomás Rubén Pruyas
- Vice Governor of Entre Rios Province: José Lauritto
- Vice Governor of Formosa Province: Floro Bogado
- Vice Governor of Jujuy Province: Pedro Segura
- Vice Governor of La Pampa Province: Luis Alberto Campo
- Vice Governor of La Rioja Province: Teresita Luna
- Vice Governor of Misiones Province: Sandra Giménez
- Vice Governor of Neuquén Province: Ana Pechen
- Vice Governor of Rio Negro Province: Bautista Mendioroz
- Vice Governor of Salta Province: Andrés Zottos
- Vice Governor of San Juan Province: Rubén Uñac
- Vice Governor of San Luis Province: Jorge Luis Pellegrini
- Vice Governor of Santa Cruz: Luis Martínez Crespo
- Vice Governor of Santa Fe Province: Griselda Tessio
- Vice Governor of Santiago del Estero: Ángel Niccolai
- Vice Governor of Tierra del Fuego: Carlos Basanetti

== Events ==
=== January ===
- 12/13 January: Passengers protest at Ezeiza International Airport against delays by Aerolíneas Argentinas.

=== February ===
- Heavy rain and floods force thousands of people from their homes in Buenos Aires Province.

=== March ===
- 9 March: Seventeen people are killed and 47 injured after a passenger train crashes into a bus in the town of Dolores in eastern Argentina.
- 12 March: The agricultural sector starts a 20-day lock-out in protest at the increase in export taxes on soybeans and sunflower.

=== April ===
- 11 April: The 2008 Olympic Torch Relay passes through Buenos Aires for the first time, largely without incident.
- 17 April: Buenos Aires is covered in a thick cloud of smoke, closing roads and airports. The smoke is blamed on farmers burning their fields.
- 23 April: Poet Juan Gelman receives the Cervantes Prize, the Spanish-speaking world's highest literary honour.
- 24 April: Economy minister Martín Lousteau resigns following rumours of disagreements with other ministers. He is replaced with Carlos Fernández.
- 24 April: Football hero Diego Maradona is welcomed into membership of the Justicialist Party.

=== May ===
- 2 May: The eruption of the Chaitén volcano in Chile covers much of Argentina in ash, particularly the city of Esquel, and forces the cancellation of flights from Buenos Aires.
- 17 May: Dissident ARI legislators create a new political party, Solidarity and Equality (Solidaridad e Igualdad Sí, or simply Sí).

=== June ===
- 25 June: Argentina reports that its total foreign debt hit US$127 billion in the first quarter of the year — continuing to rise higher than when the country negotiated a record debt swap in 2005. The increase in combined public and private debt was driven by private companies borrowing money abroad to finance operations. Debt was US$123 billion at the end of 2007.International Herald Tribune

=== July ===
- 2 July: Lost scenes from German-Austrian director Fritz Lang's legendary silent film "Metropolis" are discovered in Argentina. Paula Félix-Didier, head of film museum Museo del Cine in Buenos Aires, discovered an uncut version of the 1927 science fiction film when she looked into reports that a tape in the archive was unusually long. She travelled to Berlin with a copy of the film and met with experts who say they are certain it is the missing original-length version of Lang's masterpiece that reveals key plot scenes and an expansion of minor roles, Die Zeit said.The Local
- 10 July: When the Teatro Colón, Latin America's most famous opera house, closed for refurbishment in November 2006, Buenos Aires city officials vowed that it would reopen in time for its centenary on May 25, 2008. But when the great day arrived, the theatre's golden proscenium arch was still in pieces on the floor, alongside plywood boards, while scaffolding rose the full 28 m (92 ft) height of its dome. To kick off the celebrations, the Colón's resident symphony orchestra was obliged to perform in a neighbouring theatre specialising in musicals, where it had to use microphones instead of relying on the opera house's fabulous natural acoustics.Economist.com
- 19 July: After months of standoff with irate farmers, and a humiliating defeat in the Senate, the government rolls back the extra levy on farm exports. The government rescinded Friday a controversial tax increase on grain exports that had sparked months of protests and bared deep divisions in one of the world's major food-producing nations.Los Angeles Times
- 23 July: Argentina replaces cabinet chief: Argentine President Cristina Fernandez names former head of the social security agency Sergio Massa as cabinet chief, in a shake-up just days after the Senate rejected a government tax hike on soy exports.Reuters

=== August ===
- 12 August: Argentina's government announces a plan to buy back some of the country's debt, triggering a recovery in financial assets following the previous week's selloff. While news of the intervention props up markets, economists remain broadly pessimistic about President Cristina Kirchner's populist economic policies, which have stoked inflation, eroded Argentina's fiscal position and alienated the agribusiness sector that is the motor of the economy. That pessimism was reflected in a move by the ratings agency Standard & Poor's Corp. to lower Argentina's foreign and local currency long-term credit ratings to B from B+.Wall Street Journal
- 13 August: The Argentine Senate passes a law that defines alimentary disorders such as obesity, anorexia and bulimia, as diseases, and therefore medical insurers have to take care of the cost of their treatment Yahoo news, Diario Clarín.
- 9-24 August: At the 2008 Summer Olympics in Beijing, Argentina wins gold medals in the Madison cycling and men's football and bronze medals in judo, sailing, and women's hockey.

== Deaths ==
=== January ===
- 9 January - Jorge Anaya, Admiral

=== February ===
- 3 February - Jorge Liderman, composer
- 4 February - Bertha Moss, actress

=== March ===
- 12 March - Jorge Guinzburg, journalist

=== May ===
- 18 May - Irma Córdoba, actress
- 25 May - Ítalo Argentino Lúder, politician
- 31 May - Nelly Láinez, actress

=== June ===
- 9 June - Esteban Mellino, actor

=== July ===
- 27 July - Osvaldo Álvarez Guerrero, politician

=== August ===
- August 2 - Pérez Celis, plastic artist
- August 15 - Carlos Meglia, comic book artist, co-creator of Cybersix

== Sports ==
See worldwide 2008 in sports

- 13 April: Argentina's male tennis team qualifies for the Davis Cup semi-finals against Russia with victory against Sweden.
- 24 June: The Dakar 2009 is off to discover a new continent, South America that offers unlimited possibilities to amateurs of wide open spaces. The round trip to Buenos Aires, via Valparaíso is a challenge in which the most enduring competitors will find their way and have the opportunity to distinguish themselves. With close to 6,000 km (3,728 mi) of specials and difficulties scattered on the whole course, the battle for the title will remain wide open until the finish...Automobilsport.com
- 19 August: Juan Esteban Curuchet and Walter Fernando Perez wins the Olympic gold medal in the Madison cycling event, the first Olympic gold in cycling for Argentina, and also the country's first gold medal in the 2008 Summer Olympics. UPI.com
- 23 August: The Argentina national football team wins gold for the second consecutive time at the 2008 Summer Olympics, with Javier Mascherano becoming the first Argentine Olympian to win two gold medals.

== See also ==
- List of Argentine films of 2008
