= 2013 in Argentina =

- Decades: 1990s; 2000s; 2010s; 2020s; 2030s
- See also: Other events of 2013; List of years in Argentina

Events from the year 2013 in Argentina

== Incumbents ==
- President: Cristina Fernández de Kirchner
- Vice President: Amado Boudou

=== Governors ===
- Governor of Buenos Aires Province: Daniel Scioli
- Governor of Catamarca Province: Lucía Corpacci
- Governor of Chaco Province:
  - Jorge Capitanich (until 20 November)
  - Juan Carlos Bacileff Ivanoff (from 20 November)
- Governor of Chubut Province: Martín Buzzi
- Governor of Córdoba: José Manuel De la Sota
- Governor of Corrientes Province: Ricardo Colombi
- Governor of Entre Ríos Province: Sergio Urribarri
- Governor of Formosa Province: Gildo Insfrán
- Governor of Jujuy Province: Eduardo Fellner
- Governor of La Pampa Province: Oscar Jorge
- Governor of La Rioja Province: Luis Beder Herrera
- Governor of Mendoza Province: Francisco Pérez
- Governor of Misiones Province: Maurice Closs
- Governor of Neuquén Province: Jorge Sapag
- Governor of Río Negro Province: Alberto Weretilneck
- Governor of Salta Province: Juan Manuel Urtubey
- Governor of San Juan Province: José Luis Gioja
- Governor of San Luis Province: Claudio Poggi
- Governor of Santa Cruz Province: Daniel Peralta
- Governor of Santa Fe Province: Antonio Bonfatti
- Governor of Santiago del Estero:
  - Gerardo Zamora (until 10 December)
  - Claudia Ledesma Abdala (from 23 December)
- Governor of Tierra del Fuego: Fabiana Ríos
- Governor of Tucumán: José Alperovich

=== Vice Governors ===
- Vice Governor of Buenos Aires Province: Gabriel Mariotto
- Vice Governor of Catamarca Province: Dalmacio Mera
- Vice Governor of Chaco Province:
  - Juan Carlos Bacileff Ivanoff (until 20 November)
  - Vacant (from 20 November)
- Vice Governor of Corrientes Province: Gustavo Canteros
- Vice Governor of Entre Rios Province: José Orlando Cáceres
- Vice Governor of Formosa Province: Floro Bogado
- Vice Governor of Jujuy Province: Guillermo Jenefes
- Vice Governor of La Pampa Province: Norma Durango
- Vice Governor of La Rioja Province: Sergio Casas
- Vice Governor of Misiones Province: Hugo Passalacqua
- Vice Governor of Neuquén Province: Ana Pechen
- Vice Governor of Rio Negro Province: Carlos Peralta
- Vice Governor of Salta Province: Andrés Zottos
- Vice Governor of San Juan Province: Sergio Uñac
- Vice Governor of San Luis Province: Jorge Raúl Díaz
- Vice Governor of Santa Cruz: Fernando Cotillo
- Vice Governor of Santa Fe Province: Jorge Henn
- Vice Governor of Santiago del Estero:
  - Ángel Niccolai (until 10 December)
  - José Emilio Neder (from 10 December)
- Vice Governor of Tierra del Fuego: Roberto Crocianelli

== Events ==
=== March ===
- 13 March: Jorge Bergoglio, the archbishop of Buenos Aires, is elected the 266th pope of the Roman Catholic Church.

=== April ===
- 1–3 April: Several flash floods in the Buenos Aires Province kill over 100 people.
- 18 April: Nearly 2 million people attend the 18A cacerolazo, to protest President Cristina Fernández de Kirchner's government.

=== June ===
- 10 June: A high school student, 16-year-old Ángeles Rawson, is murdered by the doorman of her home's building during an attempted rape.
- 13 June: Two trains collide, killing at least three and injuring 315 people.

=== September ===
- 18 September: Drummer Eduardo Vázquez is sentenced to life imprisonment for the February 2010 murder of his wife Wanda Taddei.

== Deaths ==
=== March ===
- 24 March – Susana Viau, journalist (b. 1944)

=== May ===
- 17 May – Jorge Rafael Videla, President of Argentina (b. 1925)

=== June ===
- 15 June – José Froilán González, racing driver (b. 1922)
- 21 June – Ed Iacobucci, Citrix Systems co-founder (b. 1953)

== See also ==
- Argentine legislative election, 2013
- List of Argentine films of 2013
- The road of the money K
