= 2012 in Argentina =

- Decades: 1990s; 2000s; 2010s; 2020s; 2030s
- See also: Other events of 2012; List of years in Argentina

Events from the year 2012 in Argentina

== Incumbents ==
- President: Cristina Fernández de Kirchner
- Vice President: Amado Boudou

=== Governors ===
- Governor of Buenos Aires Province: Daniel Scioli
- Governor of Catamarca Province: Lucía Corpacci
- Governor of Chaco Province: Juan Carlos Bacileff Ivanoff
- Governor of Chubut Province: Martín Buzzi
- Governor of Córdoba: José Manuel De la Sota
- Governor of Corrientes Province: Ricardo Colombi
- Governor of Entre Ríos Province: Sergio Urribarri
- Governor of Formosa Province: Gildo Insfrán
- Governor of Jujuy Province: Eduardo Fellner
- Governor of La Pampa Province: Oscar Jorge
- Governor of La Rioja Province: Luis Beder Herrera
- Governor of Mendoza Province: Francisco Pérez
- Governor of Misiones Province: Maurice Closs
- Governor of Neuquén Province: Jorge Sapag
- Governor of Río Negro Province:
  - Carlos Ernesto Soria (until 1 January)
  - Alberto Weretilneck (from 1 January)
- Governor of Salta Province: Juan Manuel Urtubey
- Governor of San Juan Province: José Luis Gioja
- Governor of San Luis Province: Claudio Poggi
- Governor of Santa Cruz Province: Daniel Peralta
- Governor of Santa Fe Province: Antonio Bonfatti
- Governor of Santiago del Estero: Gerardo Zamora
- Governor of Tierra del Fuego: Fabiana Ríos
- Governor of Tucumán: José Alperovich

=== Vice Governors ===
- Vice Governor of Buenos Aires Province: Gabriel Mariotto
- Vice Governor of Catamarca Province: Dalmacio Mera
- Vice Governor of Chaco Province: Juan Carlos Bacileff Ivanoff
- Vice Governor of Corrientes Province: Pedro Braillard Poccard
- Vice Governor of Entre Rios Province: José Orlando Cáceres
- Vice Governor of Formosa Province: Floro Bogado
- Vice Governor of Jujuy Province: Guillermo Jenefes
- Vice Governor of La Pampa Province: Norma Durango
- Vice Governor of La Rioja Province: Sergio Casas
- Vice Governor of Misiones Province: Hugo Passalacqua
- Vice Governor of Neuquén Province: Ana Pechen
- Vice Governor of Rio Negro Province: Carlos Peralta
- Vice Governor of Salta Province: Andrés Zottos
- Vice Governor of San Juan Province: Sergio Uñac
- Vice Governor of San Luis Province: Jorge Raúl Díaz
- Vice Governor of Santa Cruz: Fernando Cotillo
- Vice Governor of Santa Fe Province: Jorge Henn
- Vice Governor of Santiago del Estero: Ángel Niccolai
- Vice Governor of Tierra del Fuego: Roberto Crocianelli

== Events ==
=== January ===
- 1 January -
  - The Governor of Río Negro Carlos Soria is shot and killed by his wife Susana Freydoz after an argument over Soria's affair with a much younger woman.
  - Alberto Weretilneck becomes governor of Río Negro.

=== June ===
- 14 June: Drummer Eduardo Vázquez is convicted of killing his wife Wanda Taddei in February 2010 and sentenced to 18 years in prison. The sentence is upgraded to life in prison in September 2013.

=== October ===
- 17 October: Members of rock band Callejeros are found guilty in a retrial over the 2004 Cromañón nightclub fire. Band members Patricio Fontanet, Eduardo Vázquez, and other members are convicted and sentenced to penalties of up to seven years' imprisonment.

== Deaths in 2012 ==
=== January ===
- 1 January -
  - Jorge Andrés Boero, 38, motorcycle racer, accident on the Dakar rally. (born 1973)
  - Carlos Soria, 63, politician, Secretary of Intelligence (2002) and Governor of Río Negro (2011), shot. (born 1948)

=== February ===
- 8 February- Luis Alberto Spinetta, 62, lung cancer.

=== April ===
- 3 April – Eduardo Luis Duhalde

== See also ==
- List of Argentine films of 2012
