= 2009 in Argentina =

- Decades: 1980s; 1990s; 2000s; 2010s; 2020s
- See also: Other events of 2009; List of years in Argentina

Events from the year 2009 in Argentina.

== Incumbents ==
- President: Cristina Fernández de Kirchner
- Vice President: Julio Cobos

=== Governors ===
- Governor of Buenos Aires Province: Daniel Scioli
- Governor of Catamarca Province: Eduardo Brizuela del Moral
- Governor of Chaco Province: Juan Carlos Bacileff Ivanoff
- Governor of Chubut Province: Mario Das Neves
- Governor of Córdoba: Juan Schiaretti
- Governor of Corrientes Province:
  - Arturo Colombi (until 10 December)
  - Ricardo Colombi (from 10 December)
- Governor of Entre Ríos Province: Sergio Urribarri
- Governor of Formosa Province: Gildo Insfrán
- Governor of Jujuy Province: Walter Barrionuevo
- Governor of La Pampa Province: Oscar Jorge
- Governor of La Rioja Province: Luis Beder Herrera
- Governor of Mendoza Province: Francisco Pérez
- Governor of Misiones Province: Maurice Closs
- Governor of Neuquén Province: Jorge Sapag
- Governor of Río Negro Province: Miguel Saiz
- Governor of Salta Province: Juan Manuel Urtubey
- Governor of San Juan Province: José Luis Gioja
- Governor of San Luis Province: Alberto Rodríguez Saá
- Governor of Santa Cruz Province: Daniel Peralta
- Governor of Santa Fe Province: Hermes Binner
- Governor of Santiago del Estero: Gerardo Zamora
- Governor of Tierra del Fuego: Fabiana Ríos
- Governor of Tucumán: José Alperovich

=== Vice Governors ===
- Vice Governor of Buenos Aires Province: Alberto Balestrini
- Vice Governor of Catamarca Province: Marta Grimaux
- Vice Governor of Chaco Province: Juan Carlos Bacileff Ivanoff
- Vice Governor of Corrientes Province:
  - Tomás Rubén Pruyas (until 10 December)
  - Pedro Braillard Poccard (starting 10 December)
- Vice Governor of Entre Rios Province: José Lauritto
- Vice Governor of Formosa Province: Floro Bogado
- Vice Governor of Jujuy Province: Pedro Segura
- Vice Governor of La Pampa Province: Luis Alberto Campo
- Vice Governor of La Rioja Province: Teresita Luna
- Vice Governor of Misiones Province: Sandra Giménez
- Vice Governor of Neuquén Province: Ana Pechen
- Vice Governor of Rio Negro Province: Bautista Mendioroz
- Vice Governor of Salta Province: Andrés Zottos
- Vice Governor of San Juan Province: Rubén Uñac
- Vice Governor of San Luis Province: Jorge Luis Pellegrini
- Vice Governor of Santa Cruz: Luis Martínez Crespo
- Vice Governor of Santa Fe Province: Griselda Tessio
- Vice Governor of Santiago del Estero: Ángel Niccolai
- Vice Governor of Tierra del Fuego: Carlos Basanetti

== Events ==
=== January ===
- 3–17 January – Dakar Rally
- 19–25 January – Tour de San Luis

=== February ===
- 16–22 February – Copa Telmax

=== March ===
- 26–17 March – Pan American Judo Championships

=== April ===
- 23–26 April – Rally Argentina

=== June ===
- 28 June – legislative election

=== July ===
- 8 July – Copa Libertadores Finals

=== August ===
- 18 August: Honduras severs diplomatic ties with Argentina. This decision comes after President Cristina Kirchner's strong support for the ousted Honduran leader, Manuel Zelaya.
- 19 August – Cromañón nightclub fire: A court sentences businessman Omar Chabán to 20 years in prison. Others involved in the December 2004 fire are also convicted, while members of Callejeros, including Patricio Fontanet and Eduardo Vázquez are acquitted.
- 22–23 August – South American Ski Mountaineering Championship
- 26–31 August: An unexpected heat wave hits Argentina, with temperatures soaring above 30 °C, breaking previous winter records.

== Deaths ==
=== March ===
- 31 March – Raúl Alfonsín, former President of Argentina

=== October ===
- 4 October – Mercedes Sosa, singer

== See also ==
- List of Argentine films of 2009
- 2009 flu pandemic in Argentina
- 2009 TC 2000 season
- Argentina at the 2009 World Championships in Athletics
