= 2010 in Argentina =

- Decades: 1990s; 2000s; 2010s; 2020s; 2030s
- See also: Other events of 2010; List of years in Argentina

Events from the year 2010 in Argentina.

== Incumbents ==
- President: Cristina Fernández de Kirchner
- Vice President: Julio Cobos

=== Governors ===
- Governor of Buenos Aires Province: Daniel Scioli
- Governor of Catamarca Province: Eduardo Brizuela del Moral
- Governor of Chaco Province: Juan Carlos Bacileff Ivanoff
- Governor of Chubut Province: Mario Das Neves
- Governor of Córdoba: Juan Schiaretti
- Governor of Corrientes Province: Ricardo Colombi
- Governor of Entre Ríos Province: Sergio Urribarri
- Governor of Formosa Province: Gildo Insfrán
- Governor of Jujuy Province: Walter Barrionuevo
- Governor of La Pampa Province: Oscar Jorge
- Governor of La Rioja Province: Luis Beder Herrera
- Governor of Mendoza Province: Francisco Pérez
- Governor of Misiones Province: Maurice Closs
- Governor of Neuquén Province: Jorge Sapag
- Governor of Río Negro Province: Miguel Saiz
- Governor of Salta Province: Juan Manuel Urtubey
- Governor of San Juan Province: José Luis Gioja
- Governor of San Luis Province: Alberto Rodríguez Saá
- Governor of Santa Cruz Province: Daniel Peralta
- Governor of Santa Fe Province: Hermes Binner
- Governor of Santiago del Estero: Gerardo Zamora
- Governor of Tierra del Fuego: Fabiana Ríos
- Governor of Tucumán: José Alperovich

=== Vice Governors ===
- Vice Governor of Buenos Aires Province: Alberto Balestrini
- Vice Governor of Catamarca Province: Marta Grimaux
- Vice Governor of Chaco Province: Juan Carlos Bacileff Ivanoff
- Vice Governor of Corrientes Province: Pedro Braillard Poccard
- Vice Governor of Entre Rios Province: José Lauritto
- Vice Governor of Formosa Province: Floro Bogado
- Vice Governor of Jujuy Province: Pedro Segura
- Vice Governor of La Pampa Province: Luis Alberto Campo
- Vice Governor of La Rioja Province: Teresita Luna
- Vice Governor of Misiones Province: Sandra Giménez
- Vice Governor of Neuquén Province: Ana Pechen
- Vice Governor of Rio Negro Province: Bautista Mendioroz
- Vice Governor of Salta Province: Andrés Zottos
- Vice Governor of San Juan Province: Rubén Uñac
- Vice Governor of San Luis Province: Jorge Luis Pellegrini
- Vice Governor of Santa Cruz: Luis Martínez Crespo
- Vice Governor of Santa Fe Province: Griselda Tessio
- Vice Governor of Santiago del Estero: Ángel Niccolai
- Vice Governor of Tierra del Fuego: Carlos Basanetti

== Events ==
=== January ===
- 1–16 January – Dakar Rally
- 18–24 January – Tour de San Luis

=== February ===
- 15–21 February – Copa Telmex
- 27 February – Salta earthquake

=== March ===
- 19–21 March – Rally Argentina

=== May ===
- 25 May – Argentina Bicentennial

=== June ===
- 5–21 June – IRB Junior World Championship

=== December ===
- 3–5 December – FIA GT1 San Luis round

== Deaths ==
- 18 February – Ariel Ramírez, composer, pianist and music director
- 21 February – Wanda Taddei, wife of drummer Eduardo Vázquez, who is later convicted of her murder
- 30 August – Francisco Varallo, football forward
- 20 October – Mariano Ferreyra, political activist is killed during a confrontation against rail union leaders.
- 27 October – Néstor Kirchner, former President of Argentina

== See also ==
- Argentina at the 2010 Summer Youth Olympics
- List of Argentine films of 2010
- 2010 TC 2000 season
- Argentina at the 2010 Winter Olympics
- Argentina at the 2010 Winter Paralympics
