= 2016 in Argentina =

- Decades: 1990s; 2000s; 2010s; 2020s; 2030s
- See also: Other events of 2016; List of years in Argentina

The following lists events that happened in Argentina in 2016.

== Incumbents ==
- President: Mauricio Macri
- Vice President: Gabriela Michetti

=== Governors ===
- Governor of Buenos Aires Province: María Eugenia Vidal
- Governor of Catamarca Province: Lucía Corpacci
- Governor of Chaco Province: Domingo Peppo
- Governor of Chubut Province: Mario Das Neves
- Governor of Córdoba: Juan Schiaretti
- Governor of Corrientes Province: Ricardo Colombi
- Governor of Entre Ríos Province: Gustavo Bordet
- Governor of Formosa Province: Gildo Insfrán
- Governor of Jujuy Province: Gerardo Morales
- Governor of La Pampa Province: Carlos Verna
- Governor of La Rioja Province: Ricardo Quintela
- Governor of Mendoza Province: Alfredo Cornejo
- Governor of Misiones Province: Hugo Passalacqua
- Governor of Neuquén Province: Omar Gutiérrez
- Governor of Río Negro Province: Alberto Weretilneck
- Governor of Salta Province: Juan Manuel Urtubey
- Governor of San Juan Province: Sergio Uñac
- Governor of San Luis Province: Alberto Rodríguez Saá
- Governor of Santa Cruz Province: Alicia Kirchner
- Governor of Santa Fe Province: Miguel Lifschitz
- Governor of Santiago del Estero: Claudia Ledesma Abdala
- Governor of Tierra del Fuego: Rosana Bertone
- Governor of Tucumán: Juan Luis Manzur

=== Vice Governors ===
- Vice Governor of Buenos Aires Province: Daniel Salvador
- Vice Governor of Catamarca Province: Octavio Gutiérrez
- Vice Governor of Chaco Province: Daniel Capitanich
- Vice Governor of Corrientes Province: Gustavo Canteros
- Vice Governor of Entre Rios Province: Adán Bahl
- Vice Governor of Formosa Province: Floro Bogado
- Vice Governor of Jujuy Province: Carlos Haquim
- Vice Governor of La Pampa Province: Mariano Fernández
- Vice Governor of La Rioja Province: Néstor Bosetti
- Vice Governor of Misiones Province: Oscar Herrera Ahuad
- Vice Governor of Nenquen Province: Rolando Figueroa
- Vice Governor of Rio Negro Province: Pedro Pesatti
- Vice Governor of Salta Province: Miguel Isa
- Vice Governor of San Juan Province: Marcelo Lima
- Vice Governor of San Luis Province: Carlos Ponce
- Vice Governor of Santa Cruz: Pablo González
- Vice Governor of Santa Fe Province: Carlos Fascendini
- Vice Governor of Santiago del Estero: José Emilio Neder
- Vice Governor of Tierra del Fuego: Juan Carlos Arcando

== Events ==
=== January ===
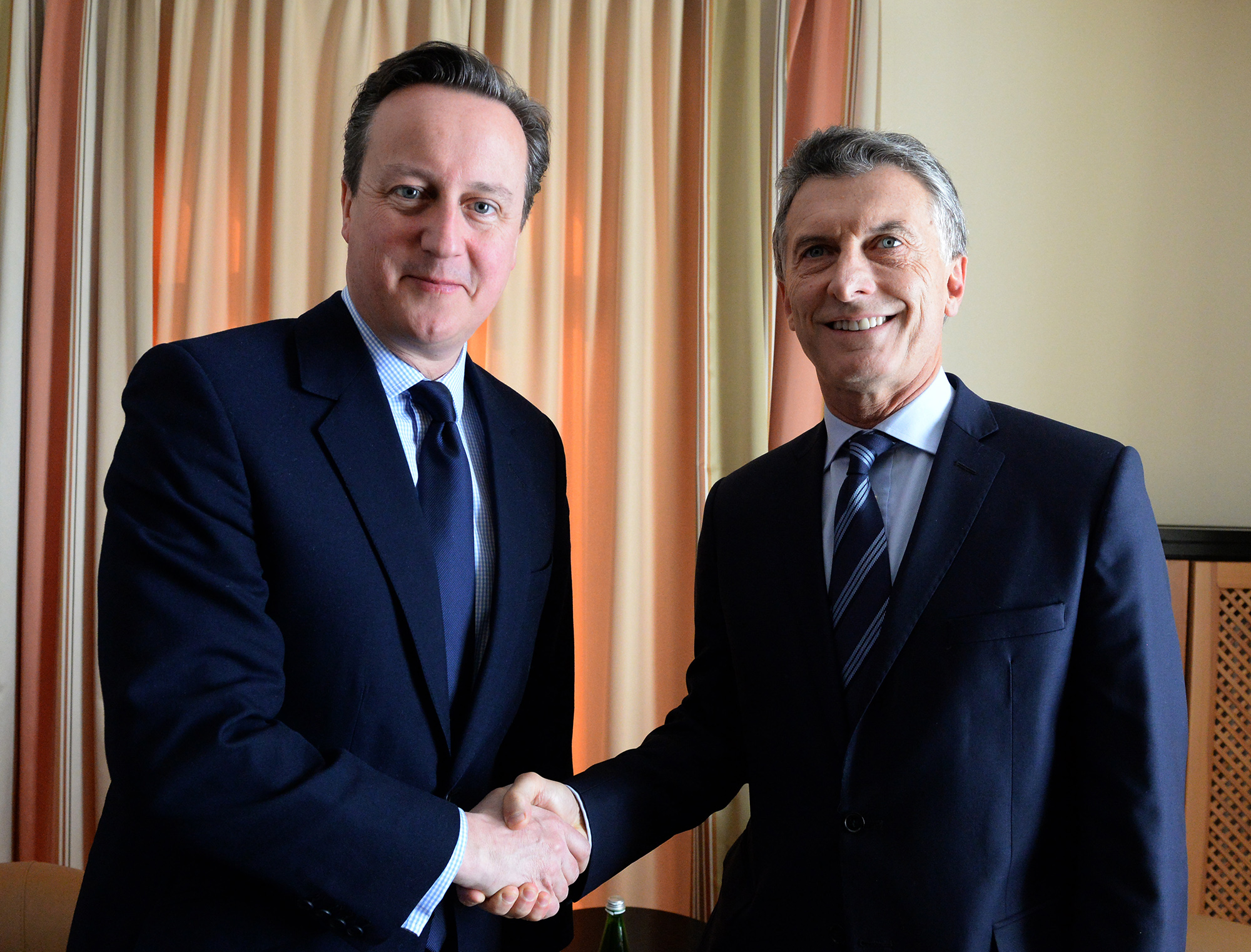
President Mauricio Macri (right) salutes the British Prime Minister David Cameron (left) at the World Economic Forum.

- 2: A band of thieves storm into the radio of the Mothers of the Plaza de Mayo.
- 6: Mauricio Macri lifts the custom restrictions on the imports of books.
- 7: Protests of former employees of the Néstor Kirchner Cultural Centre.
- 8: The Buenos Aires Provincial Police is removed from the pursuit of the fugitives of the Triple crime.
- 9: Capture of the three fugitives of the Triple crime.
- 13: Martín Sabbatella attempts to enter the premises of the Federal Authority for Audiovisual Communication Services, but the police prevents him from doing so.
- 16: Milagro Sala is arrested on charges of fraud and criminal conspiracy.
- 19: Mauricio Macri takes part in the World Economic Forum.
- 31: A fire strikes the studios of El Trece and Todo Noticias.

=== February ===
- 6: 2016 Buenos Aires ePrix
- 16: State Visit of Matteo Renzi, Prime Minister of Italy.
- 24: State Visit of François Hollande, President of France.

=== March ===
- 23-24: State Visit of Barack Obama, President of the United States of America.

=== June ===
- 3: More than 300 thousand people attended the protest of #NiUnaMenos, which took place mainly in Buenos Aires but was also repeated throughout the whole country.
- 15-16: Mauricio Macri visited Colombia in the form of a State Visit.
- 17: 195th Anniversary of the Death of Martín Miguel de Güemes, a national holiday was made for the occasion.

=== July ===
- 2-6: Mauricio Macri went on a European Tour, having visited Paris (where he met President François Hollande), Brussels (where he met Donald Tusk as well as King Philippe and Queen Mathilde), and Berlin (where he met President Joachim Gauck and Chancellor Angela Merkel).
- 6: The National Congress had its formal session in the City of Tucumán for the first time in its history, as part of the celebrations for the Bicentennial of the Declaration of Independence.
- 9: Bicentennial of the Declaration of Independence of Argentina. The main celebrations were held in the City of Tucumán.
- 10: Celebrations for the Bicentennial of the Declaration of Independence were held in Buenos Aires.
- 29: State Visit of Enrique Peña Nieto, President of Mexico.

=== August ===
- 7-9: Official Visit of Ban Ki-moon, Secretary-General of the United Nations.

=== September ===
- 4-5: Mauricio Macri attended to the 11th G-20 summit in Hangzhou, China.
- 10: Discovering of the Gancedo meteorite, the second-largest known fragment of the meteor shower that fell in Campo del Cielo, in Charata, Chaco Province, Argentina.
- 12-15: Argentina Business & Investment Forum

=== October ===
- 3: Visit of Michel Temer, President of Brazil.
- 11: Queen Máxima of the Netherlands visits her home country in her role of UN Secretary-General's Special Advocate for Inclusive Finance for Development.
- 15: Mauricio Macri visited Italy and the Vatican City, where he met Prime Minister Matteo Renzi and Pope Francis. The President assisted as well to the Canonization of José Gabriel del Rosario Brochero.
- 19: #NiUnaMenos, a massive protest against femicides and gender violence, took place in all cities of Argentina for the second time of the year.
- 24: State Visit of Tabaré Vázquez, President of Uruguay.

=== November ===
- 17: State Visit of Justin Trudeau, Prime Minister of Canada.
- 21: State Visit of Shinzo Abe, Prime Minister of Japan.

=== December ===
- 1: Argentina assumes the pro-tempore Presidency of the Mercosur after the suspension of Venezuela from the organization.
- 16: State Visit of Michelle Bachelet, President of Chile.
- 21: Isela Costantini resigns as CEO of Aerolíneas Argentinas.
- 26: Alfonso Prat-Gay, Minister of Treasury and Public Finances, announces his resignation.
- 31: Alfonso Prat-Gay makes effective his resignation.

== Deaths ==
- February 8: Amelia Bence, actress
- March 8: Aldo Ferrer, economist
- March 10: Roberto Perfumo, footballer and sports commentator
- April 13: Mariano Mores, tango composer and pianist
- August 19: Horacio Salgán, tango musician
- October 8: Maximiliano Giusti, 25, footballer (car accident)
- November 22: Carlos Fayt, lawyer and politician

== See also ==
- List of Argentine films of 2016
