= Andrés Carrasco =

Andrés Carrasco may refer to:

- Andrés Carrasco (biologist)
- Andrés Carrasco (football manager)
