= Midón =

Midón is a surname of Spanish origin. Notable people with the surname include:

- Hugo Midón (1944–2011), Argentine author of children's books, theater director and actor;
- Lautaro Midón (born 2004), Argentine tennis player;
- Raul Midón (born 1966), American singer-songwriter and guitarist from New Mexico.
