= List of Argentine films of 2011 =

This is a list of Argentinian films of 2011 organized by theatrical release date.

Argentine films of 2011
| Title | Director | Release | Genre |
A - B
| Accidentes gloriosos | Mauro Andrizzi | September | |
| Alfredo Li Gotti. Una pasión cinéfila | Fernando Spiner | June 23 | Western |
| Amateur | Néstor Frenkel | May 5 | Documentary |
| Antes del estreno | Santiago Giralt | November 3 | Drama |
| Animal's Run | Nicolás Grosso | | Drama |
| Back to Stay | Milagros Mumenthaler | August 8 | Comedy |
| Buen día, día | Eduardo Pinto & Sergio Costantino | January 13 | Documentary |
C - D
| Cerro Bayo | Victoria Galardi | August 18 | Dramatic comedy |
| Clandestine Childhood | Benjamín Ávila | September 20 | Drama |
| Cruzadas | Diego Rafecas | April 21 | Comedy |
| Damn Summer | Luis Ortega | November 3 | Drama |
| De caravana | Rosendo Ruíz | May 5 | Comedy |
| Desbordar | Alex Tossenberger | June 2 | Drama |
| Desmadre | Jazmín Stuart | September 15 | Comedy-drama |
| Don gato y su pandilla | Alberto Mar | October 6 | Comedy |
E
| El abismo... Todavía estamos | Pablo Yotich | March 24 | Drama |
| El agua del fin del mundo | Paula Siero | October 6 | Drama |
| El estudiante | Santiago Mitre | September 1 | Drama |
| El dedo | Sergio Teubal | May 19 | Black Comedy |
| El derrotado | Javier Torre | April 14 | Drama |
| El día que cambió la historia | Sergio Pérez | March 15 | Documentary |
| El gato desaparece | Carlos Sorín | April 21 | Drama |
| El invierno de los raros | Rodrigo Guerrero | April 7 | Drama |
| El jefe | Jaime Escalon Buraglial | November 3 | Comedy |
| El mar ajeno | Oskar Santos | March 31 | Drama |
| El retrato postergado | Andrés Nicolas Cuervo | July 7 | Documentary |
| El túnel de los huesos | Nacho Garassino | June 16 | Drama |
| Empleadas y patrones | Abner Benaim | August 4 | Documentary |
| Eva de la Argentina | María Seoane | October 20 | Animation - Documentary |
F
| Familia para armar | Edgardo González Amer | March 17 | Dramatic Comedy |
| Fase 7 | Nicolás Goldbart | March 3 | Action |
| Fontana. La frontera interior | Juan Bautista Stagnaro | October 27 | DramaJuan Bautista Stagnar |
G - K
| Güelcom | Yago Blanco | August 4 | Comedy |
| Hacerme feriante | Julián d’Angiolillo | February 10 | Documentary |
| Hermanitos del fin del mundo | Julio Midú | July 14 | Children's |
| Juan y Eva | Paula de Luque | September 15 | Dramatic Biography |
| Juntos para siempre | Pablo Solarz | June 16 | Comedy |
L - R
| Las acacias | Pablo Giorgelli | November 24 | Drama |
| Las aventuras de Nahuel | Alejandro Malowicki | July 21 | Animation |
| Los Marziano | Ana Katz | April 14 | Comedy |
| Los santos sucios | Luis Ortega | January 6 | Drama |
| La campana | Fredy Torres | December 15 | Drama |
| La mala verdad | Miguel Angel Rocca | December 1 | Drama |
| La palabra empeñada | Juan Pablo Ruiz - Martín Masetti | May 26 | Documentary |
| La última mirada | Víctor Jorge Ruiz | December 22 | Drama |
| La vida nueva | Santiago Palavecino | September 22 | Drama |
| La vieja de atrás | Pablo José Meza | January 20 | Drama |
| Lo siniestro | Sergio Mazurek | November 24 | Horror |
| Medianeras | Gustavo Taretto | October 6 | Comedy |
| Mía | Javier van de Couter | November 10 | Drama |
| ¿Qué culpa tiene el tomate? | Jorge Coira - Alejo Hoijman - Paola Vieira - Carolina Navas - Josué Mendez - Alejandra Szeplaki | June 2 | Documentary |
| Querida voy a comprar cigarrillos y vuelvo | Mariano Cohn y Gastón Duprat | May 5 | Comedy |
| Retornos | Luis Avilés | June 9 | Drama |
S - T
| San Martín: El Cruce de los Andes | Leandro Ipiña | April 7 | Historical |
| Secuestro y muerte | Rafael Filippelli | May 5 | Drama |
| Si fueras yo | David Dobkin | October 27 | Comedy |
| Sidra | Diego Recalde | January 20 | Comedy |
| Soi Cumbio | Andrea Yannino | September 8 | Documentary |
| Solos en la ciudad | Diego Corsini - Sebastián Botticelli | October 13 | Comedy |
| Sudor frío | Adrián García Bogliano | February 3 | Horror |
| Tata Cedrón, el regreso de Juancito caminador | Fernando Pérez Vacchini | December 1 | Documentary |
| Testimonio de una vocación | Jorge Valencia - Eduardo López - Jaime Lozano | September 29 | Documentary |
| Tierra de mujeres. De Winifreda a Famatina | Miguel Mirra | May 5 | Documentary |
| Tierra sublevada II - Oro negro | Fernando Ezequiel Solanas | October 13 | Documentary |
U - Z
| Un amor | Paula Hernández | November 10 | Drama |
| Un cuento chino | Sebastián Borensztein | March 24 | Dramatic Comedy |
| Un día en Constitución | Juan Dickinson | September 29 | Documentary |
| Un mundo misterioso | Rodrigo Moreno | August 5 | Drama |
| Un rey para la Patagonia | Lucas N. Turturro | October 20 | Documentary |
| Un tren a Pampa blanca | Rodolfo Pochat | April 28 | Documentary |
| Vaquero | Facundo Agrelo y Juan Minujin | September 29 | Comedy |
| Verdades verdaderas: La vida de Estela | Nicolás Gil Lavedra | November 17 | Drama |
| Violeta | Andrés Wood | October 27 | Dramatic Biography |
| Widows | Marcos Carnevale | August 18 | Dramatic Comedy |

== See also ==
- 2011 in Argentina
