= List of Argentine films of 2008 =

A list of films produced in Argentina in 2008:

Argentine films of 2008
Title	Director	Release	Genre
A - C
100% lucha, la film	Juan Iribas	24 of July	
1973, un grito del corazón	Liliana Mazure	26 of June	
Acné	Federico Veiroj	7 January	
Ángeles caídos	Pablo Reyero	7 of February	
Aniceto	Leonardo Favio	12 of June	
Brigada explosiva, misión pirata	Rodolfo Ledo	31 of January	
Bye Bye Life	Enrique Piñeyro		Documentary
Café de los maestros	Miguel Kohan	26 of June	musical
La cámara oscura	María Victoria Menis	16 of October	
El cine de Maite	Federico Palazzo	16 of October	
Construcción de una ciudad	Néstor Frenkel	2 of May	
Cordero de Dios	Lucía Cedrón	8 of May	
D - H
Dos amigos y un ladrón	Jaime L. Lozano	27 of November	
El desierto negro	Gaspar Scheuer	15 of May	
Detrás del sol, más cielo	Gastón Gularte	6 of November	
Diario argentino	Lupe Pérez García	17 of July	
Extranjera	Inés de Oliveira Cézar	3 of July	
El frasco	Alberto Lecchi	11 of September	
Furtivo	Nicolás León Tannchen	11 of December	
Gigantes de Valdés	Alex Tossenberger	17 of January	
Hechos, no palabras. Los derechos humanos en Cuba	Carolina Silvestre	10 of January	
High School Musical: El Desafio	Jorge Nisco	17 of July	
I - L
Imaginadores	Daniela Fiore	20 of March	
Impunidad	Javier Torre	2 of October	
Incómodos	Esteban Menis	30 of October	
La León	Santiago Otheguy	12 of June	
La leyenda	Sebastián Pivotto	19 of November	
Leonera	Pablo Trapero	29 of May	
Licencia número uno	Matilde Michanié	4 of September	
Liverpool	Lisandro Alonso	30 of October	
Lluvia	Paula Hernández	20 of March	
La luz del bosque	Jorge José Pstyga y Ofelia Escasany	24 of July	
M - O
La masacre de San Patricio	Juan Pablo Young y Pablo Zubizarreta	4 of July	
Matar a todos	Esteban Schroeder	6 of November	
Motivos para no enamorarse	Mariano Mucci	4 of September	
La mujer sin cabeza	Lucrecia Martel	21 of August	
La nación Mapuce	Fausta Quattrini	7 of August	
El nido vacío	Daniel Burman	24 of April	
No mires para abajo	Eliseo Subiela	30 of October	
No ser Dios y cuidarlos	Juan Carlos Andrade y Dieguillo Fernández	5 of June	
Nos otros	Daniel Raichijk	27 of November	
Olga, Victoria Olga	Mercedes Farriols	3 of April	
La orilla que se abisma	Gustavo Fontán	2 of May	
P - R
Paisito	Ana Diez	21 of August	
Palabra por palabra	Edgardo Cabeza	10 of April	
Los paranoicos	Gabriel Medina	23 of October	
La perrera	Manuel Nieto Zas	17 of April	
Por sus propios ojos	Liliana Paolinelli	18 of September	
La próxima estación	Fernando Solanas	4 of September	
Puerta 12	Pablo Tesoriere	26 of June	
Que parezca un accidente	Gerardo Herrero	14 of November	Comedia
La rabia	Albertina Carri	2 of May	
Rancho aparte	Edi Flehner	27 of March	
Regresados	Flavio Nardini / Cristian Bernard	20 of March	
La ronda	Inés Braun	29 of May	
S - Z
S.O.S. Ex	Andrés Tambornino	15 of May	
Los superagentes, nueva generación	Daniel De Felippo	24 of July	
Suspiros del corazón	Enrique Gabriel	10 of January	
Tocando en el silencio	Luciano Zito	21 of August	
El toro por las astas	Susana Nieri	31 of July	
Tres minutos	Diego Lublinsky	21 of February	
Un novio para mi mujer	Juan Taratuto	14 of August	
Valentina, la film	Eduardo Gondell	24 of July	
Las vidas posibles	Sandra Gugliotta	7 of February	
Vil romance	José Campusano	12 of November	Comedia
Visitante de invierno	Sergio Esquenazi	3 of April	
Yo soy sola	Tatiana Mereñuk	15 of May	

== See also ==
- 2008 in Argentina
