= Esteban Mellino =

Argentine actor

- Born: 13 March 1945; San Telmo, Buenos Aires, Argentina
- Died: 9 June 2008 (aged 63); Buenos Aires, Argentina
- Occupations: Actor; film director; playwright; composer
- Years active: 1965–2008
- Children: 3, including Sebastián
- Relatives: Carlos Mellino (brother)

Esteban Mellino (13 March 1945 – 9 June 2008) was an Argentine actor best known for portraying the comical character Professor Diogenes Lambetain in the television series Badia y Cia, Fashion VIP and El humor de Cafe Fashion. Mellino had originally created his famous character during the 1980s for the productions of La Barra de Lambetain and Que merengue Lambetain.

== Early life ==
Esteban Mellino was born in San Telmo, Buenos Aires, Argentina, on 13 March 1945. He originally studied psychology and medicine, but abandoned both in order to pursue acting. He landed his first role on stage during the 1960s, and eventually appeared in dozens of plays throughout his career. Mellino actually wrote several of the plays in which he appeared, including Salven a Sebastian, La nube and Angeles y Loco.

== Career ==
In 2001, Mellino adapted Angeles y Loco into a film entitled Loco, posee la formula de la felicidad (Crazy, He Has the Formula for Happiness). He starred in the film alongside Jorge Luz, Fabian Gianola and Roberto Carnaghi. His other film credits included the comedy, Los Matamonstruos en la mansion del terror and the drama, Las barras bravas.

Mellino appeared in the telenovela, Sos mi vida (You are the One) on Artear-Canal 13 in 2006. Soon afterwards, Mellino appeared in his final film role in the 2007 comedy Mas que un hombre (More than a Man), which was co-directed by Gerardo Vallina and Dady Brieva.

In addition to his acting career, Mellino was a poetry writer and music composer. He wrote music for the band, Alma y Vida, a jazz and rock band founded by his brother, Carlos Mellino, during the 1970s. Mellino also founded and ran a charitable organization charged with helping street children, soup kitchens, schools and handicapped children.

== Death ==
Esteban Mellino died of cardiac arrest in Buenos Aires on 9 June 2008, at the age of 63.
