= Carlos Fernández (politician) =

Argentine politician

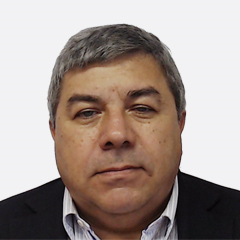

Member of the Chamber of Deputies of Argentina
- Incumbent
- Assumed office 16 December 2021
- Constituency: Misiones

Personal details
- Born: 5 February 1957 (age 69)
- Party: Front for the Renewal of Concord

Carlos Alberto Fernández is an Argentine politician who was a member of the Chamber of Deputies of Argentina from 2021 to 2025, representing the province of Misiones.

== Biography ==
He worked as a doctor before he was elected in 2021.
