= Daniela Castelo =

Argentine journalist (1968–2011)

Daniela Castelo (Buenos Aires, 8 October 1968 – Buenos Aires, 2 February 2011) was an Argentine journalist, eldest daughter of Adolfo Castelo (1940–2004). She attended secondary school in the Liceo Nacional 9 in Buenos Aires. She graduated in psychology at the University of Buenos Aires Faculty of Psychology.

In 1987 she started to work as a producer of La Noticia Rebelde, a historic program directed by her father. In 1989 she signed a contract with América 2 as producer of the program Crema Americana, presented by Juan Castro, Pato Galván and Ari Paluch.

She worked for the first time in radio with her father in the program Uno por semana on Radio Continental.

In April 2008, with the collaboration of her sister Carla Castelo and the journalist Jorge Bernárdez, she presented No se lo digas a nadie, a media analysis program on Radio Nacional, on Mondays from 0:30 to 2:00. Beginning in July 2010, she ran the program Prófugos de la noticia in Nacional Rock FM 93.7 from Monday to Friday from 17:00 to 19:00.

In November 2010 she submitted for publication a biography of her father written with her sister Carla.

On the evening of 2 February 2011, Daniela suffered a cerebral aneurysm and was admitted to the emergency room at the clinic Bazterrica in Buenos Aires, where she suffered a cardiac arrest and died.
