= Rogelio Polesello =

Argentine sculptor and painter

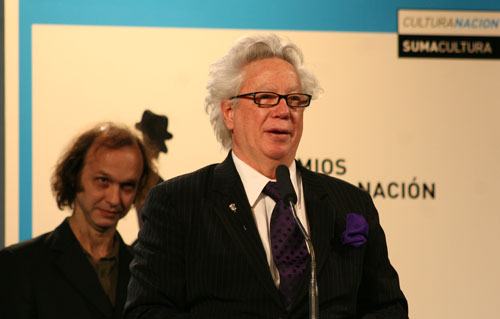
Rogelio Polesello in January 2008.

Rogelio Polesello (26 July 1939 – 6 July 2014) was an Argentine painter, muralist and sculptor. He was best known for making Op art (or optical art) known in Latin America. He won two Konex Awards; one in 1982 and another in 2012. He was born in Buenos Aires.

Rogelio Polesello studied at the Escuela Nacional de Bellas Artes Manuel Belgrano and the Escuela Nacional de Bellas Artes Prilidiano Pueyrredón, both in Buenos Aires. In 1959, he joined the Asociación Arte Nuevo, founded by Aldo Pellegrini and Carmelo Arden Quin. The paintings he included in his first solo exhibition at the Galería Peuser (Buenos Aires, 1959) followed the aesthetics of Op Art and were based on Gestalt theories. Their geometric forms, generally in black and white, added to or subtracted from the whole according to perceptive principles that produced specific optical effects.

Polesello died from a heart attack on 6 July 2014 in Buenos Aires. He was 75.

== Solo exhibitions ==
- Galería Peuser, Buenos Aires, Argentina, 1959
- Galería Pizarro, Buenos Aires, Argentina, 1960
- Galería Lirolay, Buenos Aires, Argentina, 1961
- Galería Rubbers, Buenos Aires, Argentina, 1962
- Galería Bonino, Buenos Aires, Argentina, 1966
- Museo de Bellas Artes, Caracas, Venezuela, 1966
- Pinturas laicas, Galería del Techo, Caracas, Venezuela, 1966
- Centro de Artes Visuales del Instituto Torcuato Di Tella, Buenos Aires, Argentina, 1969
- Museo de Arte Moderno, México D.F., Mexico, 1974
- Progresiones, Salas Nacionales de Cultura, Palais de Glace, Buenos Aires, Argentina, 1995
- Galería Ruth Benzacar, Buenos Aires, Argentina, 1997
- Muestra antológica, Museo Nacional de Bellas Artes, Buenos Aires, Argentina, 2000
- Imanes, Sala Cronopios, Centro Cultural Recoleta, Buenos Aires, Argentina, 2005

== Group exhibitions ==
- Premio De Ridder a la joven pintura, galeria Pizarro, Buenos Aires, 1959
- Grupo Boa, Galería Van Riel, Buenos Aires, Argentina, 1962
- Salón Esso de Artistas Plásticos de América Latina, Panamerican Union, Washington, United States, 1965
- The Emergent Decade: Latin American Painters and Painting in the 60s, Solomon R. Guggenheim Museum, New York, United States, 1966
- Premio George Braque, Museo Nacional de Bellas Artes, Buenos Aires, Argentina, 1968
- Grupo Boa, Sociedad Hebraica Argentina, Buenos Aires, Argentina, 1969
- Pintura argentina actual. Dos tendencias: geometría-surrealismo, Museo Nacional de Bellas Artes, Buenos Aires, Argentina, 1976
- Siglo XX argentino: arte y cultura, Centro Cultural Recoleta, Buenos Aires, Argentina, 1999

== Collections ==
- Albright-Knox Art Gallery, Buffalo, New York, United States
- Blanton Museum, Austin, Texas, United States
- La Tertulia Art Museum, Cali, Valle del Cauca, Colombia
- Lowe Art Museum, University of Miami, Florida, United States
- Cisneros Fontanals Art Foundation, Miami, Florida, United States
- Miguel Urrutia Art Museum, Bogotá, Colombia
- Museo de Arte Contemporáneo, Caracas, Venezuela
- Museo de Arte Latinoamericano de Buenos Aires, Argentina
- Museo Nacional de Bellas Artes, Buenos Aires, Argentina
- Museo Rufino Tamayo, México D.F., Mexico
- Solomon R. Guggenheim Museum, New York, United States
- The Bronx Museum of Arts, New York, United States

== Suggested bibliography ==
- Bayón, Damián. "Constructor con materiales nuevos: Polesello". In Rogelio Polesello. Buenos Aires: Galería Carmen Waugh, 1974
- Glusberg, Jorge. "La geometría sensible de Rogelio Polesello". In Rogelio Polesello. Buenos Aires: Ruth Benzacar Galería de Arte, 1990
- Glusberg, Jorge. Rogelio Polesello: Epi e hipergeometría. Buenos Aires: Ediciones de Arte Gaglianone, 1984
- López Anaya, Jorge. "Rogelio Polesello: The neo baroque as metaphor of our era". In Rogelio Polesello: Recent works. Panamá: Museum Galería de Arte, 1992
- Masotta, Oscar. "Rogelio Polesello y el mito de las profanaciones". In Rogelio Polesello. Buenos Aires. Galería Bonino, 1966
- Noé, Luis Felipe. "Polesello encuentra a Polesello". In Rogelio Polesello. Buenos Aires: Galería Lirolay, 1962
- Pau-Llosa, Ricardo. Un acercamiento a Rogelio Polesello. Buenos Aires: Ediciones de Arte Gaglianone, 1984
- Progresiones. Buenos Aires: Palais de Glace, 1995
- Rogelio Polesello en el Museo Nacional de Bellas Artes. Buenos Aires: Museo Nacional de Bellas Artes, 2000
- Uribe, Basilio. "Rogelio Polesello, o las proposiciones del ojo". In Rogelio Polesello. México D.F.: Museo de Arte Moderno, 1974
