= Jorge Jacobson =

Argentine journalist and newscaster

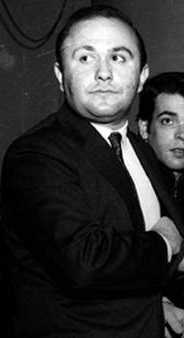
- Jorge Jacobson in 1960
- Born: 25 February 1936; Buenos Aires, Argentina
- Died: 31 July 2014 (aged 78); Buenos Aires, Argentina
- Occupations: Journalist and news anchor
- Notable credit: Telefe Noticias

Jorge Alberto Jacobson (25 February 1936 – 31 July 2014) was an Argentine radio and television journalist and newscaster. He was anchor of Telefe Noticias from 1997 to 2010 and as host in AM Del Plata, Radio 10 and Radio Continental.
