= Florentina Gómez Miranda =

Argentine politician (1912–2011)

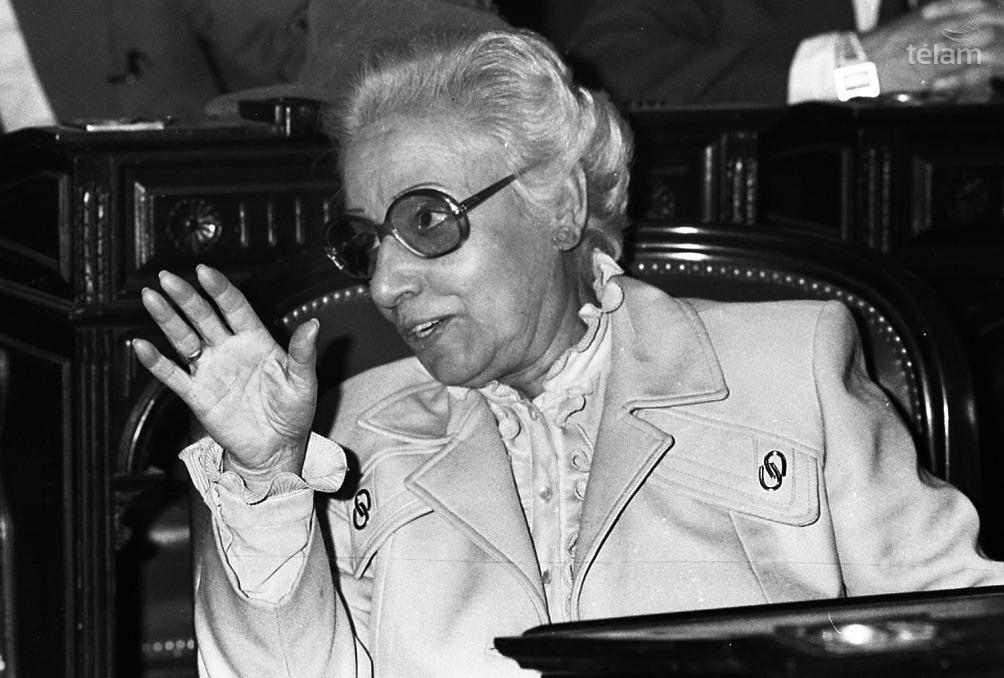
Florentina Gómez Miranda (1983)

Florentina Gómez Miranda (14 February 1912 – 1 August 2011) was an Argentine teacher and lawyer. Born in Olavarría in the province of Buenos Aires, she attended the National University of La Plata, from which she graduated in 1945. From then on, she was active in the struggle for women's rights. Among the laws she promoted, the divorce law was the most important. From 1983 to 1991, Miranda was a member of the Chamber of Deputies for the Unión Cívica Radical. After her death, Miranda lay in state in the "Salón de los pasos perdidos" in the National Congress building.
