= Andrés Carrasco (biologist) =

Argentinian molecular biologist

Andrés Carrasco (1946 in Buenos Aires – May 10, 2014) was an Argentine molecular biologist.

== Career ==
He was known for studying the effects of glyphosate used in Roundup on embryonic development. He was president and head scientist of the embryology laboratory (CONICET) of the University of Buenos Aires (UBA).

== Death ==
On 10 May 2014, Carrasco died in Buenos Aires from a heart attack, aged 67.
