= Hugo Midón =

Argentine write, theater director, and actor

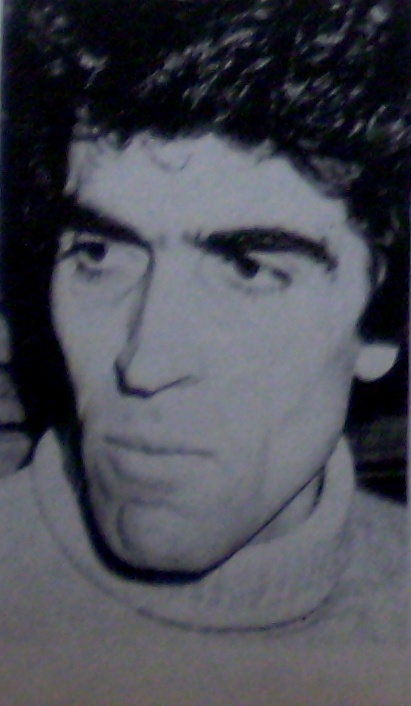
Hugo Midón.JPG

Hugo Midón (February 27, 1944 – March 25, 2011) was an Argentine children's literature writer, theater director and actor. He graduated from the Theatre Institute of the University of Buenos Aires. Among the plays he staged were Cantando sobre la mesa, El imaginario, Narices and El gato con botas. Midón won numerous awards during his career, including the Premio de la Asociación de Cronistas del Espectáculo and the Premio Nacional del Teatro.
