= National University of Salta =

Argentine public university

- Universidad Nacional de Salta
- Type: Public
- Established: 1972
- Academic staff: 2,147
- Students: 21,596
- Location: Salta, Argentina
- Website: http://www.unsa.edu.ar/

The National University of Salta (Spanish: Universidad Nacional de Salta, or UNSa) is an Argentine public national university with its main campus in the city of Salta, and regional campuses in Tartagal, San Ramón de la Nueva Orán, Rosario de la Frontera, and San José de Metán. It was founded on May 11, 1972, as a part of the Plan Taquini, a reorganization plan for education. It enrolls approximately 25,000 students per year.

== Overview ==
The National University of Salta is an autonomous public institution with legal and financial independence. Its mission is to promote, disseminate, and preserve culture through humanistic studies, scientific and technological research, and artistic creation, while also communicating its activities through different media. The university emphasizes the integral education of its community—faculty, students, graduates, and staff—instilling values of ethics, civic responsibility, and academic excellence. It also maintains ties with its graduates through continuing education programs and collaborates with public and private institutions to address national and regional issues by providing research, advice, and technical expertise.

In addition to its main campus in the city of Salta, the university operates branch campuses in Tartagal, Orán, Rosario de la Frontera, and Metán. It also runs two Secondary Education Institutes (IEM Salta and IEM Tartagal) and the radio station LRK317 – Radio Universidad Nacional de Salta. The institution offers a broad range of undergraduate and graduate programs in economics, exact sciences, natural sciences, humanities, engineering, and health sciences. Its research activity includes several institutes in cooperation with CONICET, such as the Institute of Research for the Chemical Industry (INIQUI), the Institute of Experimental Pathology (IPE), the Institute of Research in Social Sciences and Humanities (ICSOH), the Institute of Communication, Politics and Society (INCOPOS), and the Institute of Research in Non-Conventional Energy (INENCO).

== See also ==
- Argentine Universities
