= Alfredo Cornejo (politician) =

Argentine politician

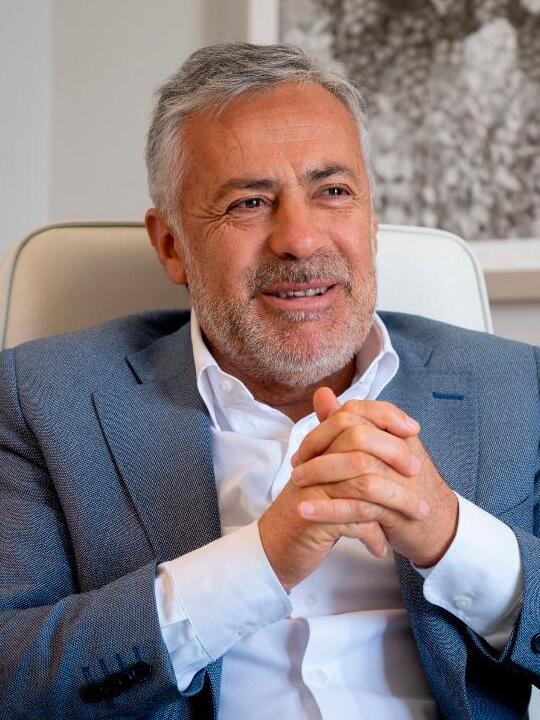

Governor of Mendoza
- Incumbent
- Assumed office 10 December 2023
- Vice Governor: Hebe Casado
- Preceded by: Rodolfo Suárez
- In office 10 December 2015 – 10 December 2019
- Vice Governor: Laura Montero
- Preceded by: Francisco Pérez
- Succeeded by: Rodolfo Suárez

National Senator
- In office 10 December 2021 – 10 December 2023
- Constituency: Mendoza

National Deputy
- In office 10 December 2019 – 10 December 2021
- Constituency: Mendoza

President of the National Committee of the Radical Civic Union
- In office 15 December 2017 – 17 December 2021
- Preceded by: José Manuel Corral
- Succeeded by: Gerardo Morales

Personal details
- Born: 20 March 1962 (age 64) San Carlos, Mendoza Province, Argentina
- Party: Radical Civic Union
- Other political affiliations: Juntos por el Cambio (2015–present)
- Occupation: Politician

Alfredo Cornejo (born 20 March 1962) is an Argentine politician. He is currently Governor of Mendoza Province since 2023, a post he previously held from 2015 to 2019. From 2019 to 2021 he was a National Deputy, and from 2021 to 2023, he was a National Senator for Mendoza. From 2017 to 2021 he was president of its national committee of the Radical Civic Union (UCR).

== Biography ==
Alfredo Cornejo studied political sciences at the National University of Cuyo. He also worked as a professor at the university.

== Political career ==
During his student years at the National University of Cuyo he was a student leader of the Franja Morada group.

He affiliated to the Radical Civic Union in 1983, and was elected as provincial senator for the 2002–2003 period. He was elected national deputy in 2005, and resigned in 2007 to run for mayor of Godoy Cruz. He served as mayor of Godoy Cruz for two terms, 2007–2011 and 2011–2015.

== Governor of Mendoza ==
In 2015 he was elected governor of the Mendoza Province and being one of the referents of Cambiemos in the interior of the country.

In 2017, he was awarded Michel Temer with the Order of Rio Branco in recognition of the promotion of bilateral ties between the two regions.

In 2018 Sebastián Piñera he was awarded the Order of Bernardo O'Higgins in the degree of Grand Officer in recognition of the collaboration in the integration of Argentina and Chile.

In the same year, the Konex Foundation awarded him a Konex Award - Diploma of Merit as one of the most important Public Administrators of the last decade in Argentina.

Political offices
Preceded by Francisco Pérez	Governor of Mendoza; 2015–2019	Succeeded by Rodolfo Suárez
Preceded by Rodolfo Suárez	Governor of Mendoza; 2023–present	Incumbent
Party political offices
Preceded by José Manuel Corral	President of the National Committee of the Radical Civic Union; 2017–2021	Succeeded by Gerardo Morales
