= Griselda Tessio =

Argentine politician

Griselda Rosa de las Mercedes Tessio (born 1946 in Esperanza, Santa Fe) is the Vice-Governor of the Argentine province of Santa Fe since 11 December 2007. Formerly a federal prosecutor based on Santa Fe City, she accompanied Governor Hermes Binner's candidacy within the Progressive, Civic and Social Front on 2 September 2007 elections.

Tessio is the daughter of Aldo Tessio, the last governor of Santa Fe who belonged to the Radical Civic Union. She is a lawyer, Licentiate in Education Sciences, criminologist, and university professor. She has been married twice, and has four children.

Tessio was affiliated to the Radical Civic Union until 1984, when President Raúl Alfonsín appointed her a federal prosecutor. She directed the unit that the General Attorney of the Nation assigned to investigate the human rights abuses of the last military dictatorship (1976–1983, known as the National Reorganization Process). In 2005–2006, as the laws (Ley de Obediencia Debida, Ley de Punto Final) protecting the security forces from trial for crimes during the dictatorship were repealed, she continued this work. Her investigations helped find the corpses of fifteen "disappeared" people in the cemetery of Santa Fe, and shed light on crimes committed under the command of Provincial Police Chief Agustín Feced in Rosario. She received multiple threats on account of these investigations.

She had no party affiliations at the time of the 2007 election, and resigned from the judiciary in February 2007, before the beginning of the campaign.

Tessio reminisced about her father when she accepted the nomination, talking about his ethical commitment: "I want to bring forth his memory because he was the one who taught me to be what I am and to believe in those old good truths which haven't been lost to us through postmodernity, globalization, injustice or the frivolization of politics."

Tessio was chosen to be a candidate as part of an agreement between the main members of his party front, the Socialists and the Radicals. Although a faction of the Radical Civic Union initially fought to select a party affiliate, governor candidate Hermes Binner insisted, first, that his running mate should be a woman, if possible from the provincial capital, and then named her directly. Tessio also fulfilled the condition of being from the north of the province, to balance given Binner's perceived link to the interests of the wealthier, more populated south (as Binner had been twice the mayor of Rosario).
