= Dalmacio Mera =

Argentine politician

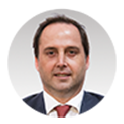

National Senator
- In office 10 December 2015 – 10 December 2021
- Constituency: Catamarca

Vice Governor of Catamarca
- In office 10 December 2011 – 10 December 2015
- Governor: Lucía Corpacci
- Preceded by: Marta Grimaux de Blanco
- Succeeded by: Octavio Gutiérrez

National Deputy
- In office 10 December 2009 – 10 December 2011
- Constituency: Catamarca

Personal details
- Born: 13 November 1970 (age 55) Salta, Argentina
- Party: Justicialist Party
- Other political affiliations: Front for Victory (2009–2011); Frente de Todos (2019–present)
- Education: University of Buenos Aires

Dalmacio Enrique Mera Figueroa (born 13 November 1970) is an Argentine lawyer and politician. Among other posts, he served as a National Senator for Catamarca Province from 2015 to 2021, as a National Deputy from 2009 to 2011, and as Vice Governor of Catamarca under Lucía Corpacci from 2011 to 2015. Mera belongs to the Justicialist Party.

== Early life and career ==
Mera was born on 13 November 1970 in Salta. His father, Julio Mera Figueroa, was active in politics and served as Interior Minister during the presidency of Carlos Menem from 1990 to 1991. In addition, Mera is a cousin of Juan Manuel Urtubey, former governor of Salta Province, and Rodolfo Urtubey, former senator for Salta.

Mera studied law at the University of Buenos Aires, graduating in 1994. He then went on to complete two post-graduate degrees on administration from the same university. He founded and edited a monthly newspaper from 1993 to 1995.

== Political career ==
From 1999 to 2000, he was the manager of ANSES in Catamarca. In 2003, he was elected to the provincial senate of Catamarca as a representative of Valle Viejo Department, with mandate to 2007. That year, he was president of the Catamarca Justicialist Party.

In the 2009 legislative election, Mera was the first candidate in the Front for Victory list to the National Chamber of Deputies, followed by Rubén Yazbek. With 33.47% of the vote, he received enough votes to be elected. Two years later, in 2011, he was the running mate of Lucía Corpacci to the governorship of Catamarca: the Corpacci–Mera ticket received 49.5% of the vote, and he was sworn in on 10 December 2011. He was succeeded in his seat as deputy by Yazbek.

In the 2015 general election, Mera was selected to be the FPV's first candidate to the National Senate, followed by Inés Blas. The FPV list received over 50% of the vote, earning the two majority seats as per the limited voting system used for the Argentine upper house. Mera originally formed part of the Front for Victory bloc, but joined most other FPV senators in breaking away and forming the Argentina Federal bloc following the 2017 legislative election. Following the 2019 general election, Mera formed part of the Frente de Todos bloc alongside most other peronist senators.

As senator, Mera formed part of the parliamentary commissions on the Environment, National Economy and Investment, Regional Economies, General Legislation, and Constitutional Affairs. He was an opponent of the legalisation of abortion in Argentina, voting against the two Voluntary Interruption of Pregnancy bill debated by the Argentine Congress in 2018 and 2020.

Mera did not stand for re-election in 2021, and his term expired on 10 December 2021.
