= Guillermo Jenefes =

Argentine politician (born 1950)

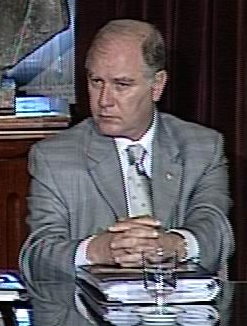

National Senator
- In office 10 December 2001 – 9 December 2011
- Constituency: Juyjuy

National Deputy
- In office 10 December 1999 – 10 December 2001
- Constituency: Jujuy

Personal details
- Born: 7 September 1950 (age 75) San Salvador de Jujuy
- Party: Justicialist Party
- Spouse: Eulalia Quevedo Carrillo

Guillermo Raúl Jenefes (born 7 September 1950, San Salvador de Jujuy) is an Argentine Justicialist Party politician. He sat in the Argentine Senate representing Jujuy Province in the majority block of the Front for Victory.

Jenefes was educated at schools in Jujuy and at the National University of Córdoba and he graduated as a lawyer specialising in banking law in 1973. He completed his military service with the 5th Tucumán Infantry Brigade, returning to Jujuy to practise law and teach. He was a founder of the Mozarteum Jujuy and was President of the Jujuy Tennis Federation. He held various positions in the banking and media industries.

Jenefes was elected as a provincial deputy in 1995 and to the Argentine Chamber of Deputies in 1999. In 2001 he was elected to the Argentine Senate and was re-elected in 2005. He is President of the Senate Media and Communications Committee.

Jenefes is the owner of Radio Visión Jujuy. His employee, journalist Juan Carlos Zambrano, was shot and killed days after stating he would reveal the details of corrupt politicians. Zambrano's murder has attracted substantial media attention.
