= Martín Buzzi =

Argentine politician

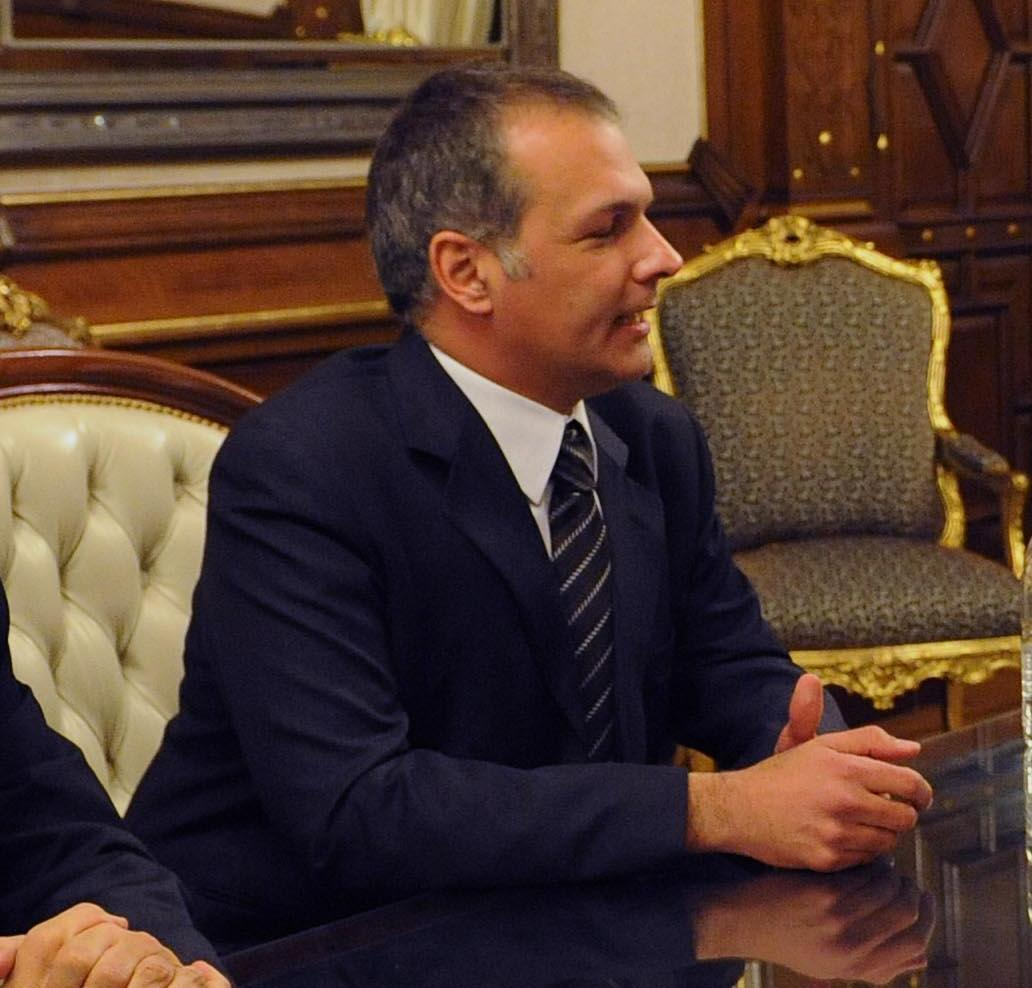

Governor of Chubut
- In office 10 December 2011 – 10 December 2015
- Lieutenant: Gustavo Mac Carthy
- Preceded by: Mario Das Neves
- Succeeded by: Mario Das Neves

Mayor of Comodoro Rivadavia
- In office December 10, 2007 – December 10, 2011
- Preceded by: Raúl Simoncini
- Succeeded by: Néstor di Pierro

Personal details
- Born: March 6, 1967 (age 58); Comodoro Rivadavia
- Political party: Justicialist Party/Federal Peronism
- Profession: political scientist

Martín Buzzi (born March 6, 1967) is an Argentine political scientist and politician who served as governor of Chubut Province from 2011 to 2015.

== Life and times ==
Martín Buzzi was born in Comodoro Rivadavia in 1967. A third-generation Chubut Province native, he enrolled at the National University of Patagonia San Juan Bosco and earned a PhD in political science. Following graduation, he joined the Institute of Public Policy at the National Academy of Sciences in 1991, and served as an adviser to a local oil industry executive, Cristóbal López. He and his wife, Carolina, have two sons.

He published his first textbook, On the Theory of Regions in Argentina, in 1993, and in 1994, entered public service as Director of Planning for his native Comodoro Rivadavia. Buzzi authored a textbook on the study of German social scientist Max Weber in 1994, and was named Professor of Political Science at his alma mater between 1995 and 2003. He served in a number of local business advocacy groups, and became Vice President of the Institute for the Regional Development of Patagonia. A term as Director of the Municipal Employment and Production Bureau was followed in December 2003 by his appointment as Provincial Minister of Production by the newly elected Governor, Mario Das Neves; Das Neves appointed him Minister of Foreign Trade, Tourism, and Investment in February 2007.

He resigned in July, and ran successfully for the post of Mayor of Comodoro Rivadavia on the Justicialist Party ticket. Buzzi maintained a low profile as mayor, during which tenure he also avoided aligning himself too visibly with any one faction of the traditionally fractious Peronist movement. He thus earned the governor's trust, and in 2011, was nominated as his party's candidate for Governor to succeed Das Neves.

The race attracted three strong candidates: Puerto Madryn Mayor Carlos Eliceche (Front for Victory), Rada Tilly Mayor Pedro Peralta (Radical Civic Union), and Buzzi; another city mayor, Gustavo MacCarthy of Trelew, was nominated as Buzzi's running-mate. The elections, held on March 20, yielded inconclusive results, however, as Buzzi's total of 37.8% (against Eliceche's 37.2%), and his winning margin of 1,551 votes led to a recount when irregularities triggered a judicial injunction against results in six precincts totaling 1,967 votes. A protracted recount process followed, as well a court-ordered re-vote held on May 29 in the six impugned precincts. Buzzi, albeit with a narrowed lead of 384 votes, was officially elected Governor of Chubut.
