= Mario das Neves =

Argentine politician

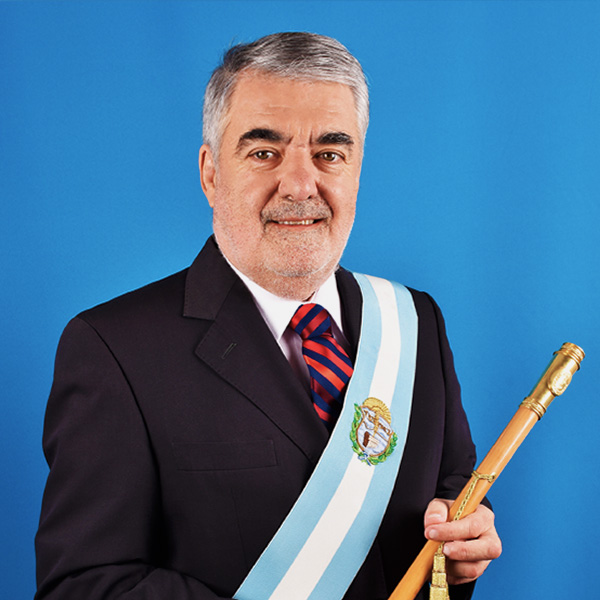

Governor of Chubut
- In office 10 December 2015 – 31 October 2017
- Preceded by: Martín Buzzi
- Succeeded by: Mariano Arcioni
- In office 10 December 2003 – 10 December 2011
- Preceded by: José Luis Lizurume
- Succeeded by: Martín Buzzi

Personal details
- Born: 27 April 1951 Avellaneda, Buenos Aires Province, Argentina
- Died: 31 October 2017 (aged 66) Rawson, Chubut Province, Argentina
- Party: Justicialist Party (until 2015); We Are All Chubut (2015–2017)
- Spouse: Raquel di Perna

Mario das Neves (27 April 1951 – 31 October 2017) was an Argentine politician who was twice governor of Chubut Province, from 2003 to 2011 and again from 2015 until his death in 2017.

== Early life and education ==
Das Neves was born in Avellaneda, in the Greater Buenos Aires conurbation, to Portuguese parents, and grew up in Santa Fe. He enrolled in Law School, but left after completing 80% of his course load and moved to Chubut at the age of 20 to try out as a footballer for Huracán de Trelew, though without success. Das Neves married the former Raquel Di Perna, with whom he had two children. He became active in the youth wing of the Peronist Justicialist Party, and by 1987 he had a key role in the administration of Trelew's municipality, under Néstor Perl.

== Political career ==
Das Neves was candidate for Mayor of Trelew in 1991 and won the first round, but lost in the second. The following year he became leader of the Chubut Justicialist Party and was elected to the Argentine Chamber of Deputies for Chubut in 1995. From his election he actively campaigned against corruption in the customs operation of Buenos Aires and headed an investigating commission that led to prosecutions. He was named "Best Deputy" in 1997. Das Neves was re-elected as a Deputy in 1999 and was the first chair of the consumer protection committee.

The interim President Adolfo Rodríguez Saá appointed Das Neves Director of Customs at the end of 2001, and he consequently resigned his seat in Congress; when a few days later Eduardo Duhalde became president, he retained Das Neves as Director of Customs. He clashed with Economy Minister Roberto Lavagna, however, and resigned.

=== Governorships ===
Das Neves stood to be Governor of Chubut in November 2003 against the UCR incumbent, José Luis Lizurume. Das Neves won the support of fellow Peronist, newly elected president Néstor Kirchner, although Kirchner and Lizurume had been close; Das Neves won by 45.6% to 41.3%. His cordial relations with Kirchnerism soured by 2009, however, and Das Neves publicly stated that Kirchner had become "arrogant" and partisan to "dividing and conquering" by way of retaining control over Peronism, adding that, despite the former president's professed support, Kirchner was "not my friend". Das Neves later initiated the privatization of a network of provincially owned public services cooperatives.

Governor Das Neves finished his mandate in 2011, and he publicly considered endorsing his wife, Raquel di Perna, or his sister-in-law, Senator Graciela di Perna, as his successor. He ultimately endorsed the Mayor of Comodoro Rivadavia, Martín Buzzi, and his Modelo Chubut ticket, . The elections, held on March 20, were too close to call between Buzzi and the Mayor of Puerto Madryn, Carlos Eliceche (Front for Victory). Buzzi's slim margin of victory led to a recount and a judicial injunction against results in six precincts. Following a protracted recount process, as well a court-ordered re-vote held on May 29 in the six impugned precincts, Buzzi was officially elected Governor of Chubut.

Das Neves unsuccessfully sought the Federal Peronist nomination for the Presidency in 2011. He was later nominated by Popular Union candidate Eduardo Duhalde as his running mate.

== Death ==
On 31 October 2017, Das Neves suffered a heart attack and died, aged 66. He had battled against colon cancer for two years.

Preceded by José Luis Lizurume	Governor of Chubut; 2003—2011	Succeeded by Martín Buzzi
Preceded by Martín Buzzi	Governor of Chubut; 2015–2017	Succeeded by Mariano Arcioni
