= Fabiana Ríos =

Argentine politician (born 1964)

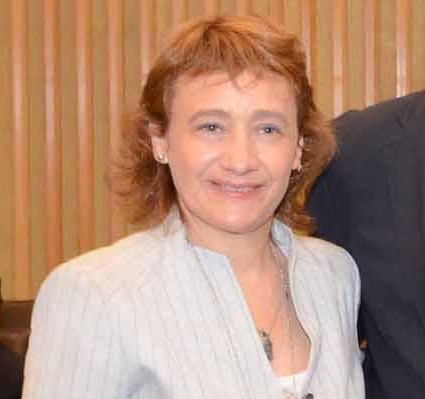

Governor of Tierra del Fuego, Antarctica and Southern Atlantic Islands
- In office December 10, 2007 – December 10, 2015
- Vice Governor: Carlos Basanetti
- Preceded by: Hugo Cóccaro
- Succeeded by: Rosana Bertone

Personal details
- Born: March 31, 1964 (age 62) Rosario, Santa Fe
- Party: Patagonian Social Party (since 2010); ARI (until 2010)
- Education: National University of Rosario
- Profession: Pharmacist

María Fabiana Ríos (born March 31, 1964, in Rosario, Santa Fe) is an Argentine politician and founder of the Patagonian Social Party. She was the governor of the province of Tierra del Fuego from December 17, 2007, to December 10, 2015. She was first elected with the support of the party ARI (Afirmación para una República de Iguales, "Support for an Egalitarian Republic"), but she left it in 2010 and created her own party, with which she was re-elected. She was the only female governor in Argentina, until the election of Lucía Corpacci of Catamarca Province. She was succeeded in office by another woman, Rosana Bertone.

Ríos was elected governor on June 24, 2007. She is the first woman to be elected governor of an Argentine province and the first woman governor of Tierra del Fuego Province. Prior to that she was a National Deputy.

Ríos graduated as a pharmacist from the National University of Rosario. She moved to Tierra del Fuego, a scarcely populated province on the southern end of Argentina, at the age of 23, and married Gustavo Longui, with whom she had two daughters. She occupied several important posts in the healthcare administration of the city of Río Grande.

== Early political career ==
Ríos entered politics under the mentorship of the Socialist legislator Alfredo Bravo, and started working within the Alliance for Work, Justice and Education (the short-lived coalition that brought Fernando de la Rúa to the presidency in 1999). She was elected a provincial Deputy in the legislature of Tierra del Fuego in 1999, where she served until 2003.

Upon the breakup of the Alliance after the 2001 crisis, Ríos aligned with Elisa Carrió and worked on the construction of the local ARI. She ran for governor in 2003, but came in the third place. Later that year, she was elected National Deputy for Tierra del Fuego, defeating the Justicialist Party and obtaining the first electoral victory for the nascent ARI at the provincial level.

== Governor elect ==
Ríos ran for governor again at the 2007 election, and came close second at the first round, behind the Justicialist-Kirchnerist governor and candidate for re-election Hugo Cóccaro. In the subsequent runoff election she beat Cóccaro with about 52% of the vote. She took office on December 17, 2007.

The triumph of Ríos was especially marked by the media as she was the first woman to be elected governor in the history of Argentina (other women have served as provincial governors, but only as vice governors taking the place of governors who had previously resigned). The Tierra del Fuego election also received increased exposure in the Buenos Aires-based media because it was held on the same day as the mayoral elections that made Mauricio Macri the Chief of Government of the Argentine capital. Both elections resulted in the defeat of candidates explicitly backed by the national government.

== Same-sex marriage in Tierra del Fuego ==
On 29 December 2009, the first same-sex couple to marry in Latin America were married in Ushuaia, Tierra del Fuego. Although Argentina's Civil Code at that time did not allow marriage between people of the same sex, Governor Rios issued a special decree allowing the couple to wed there. Same sex marriage became legal in Argentina a few months later, on July 15, 2010.

== See also ==
- Politics of Argentina
