= Lucía Corpacci =

Argentine physician and politician

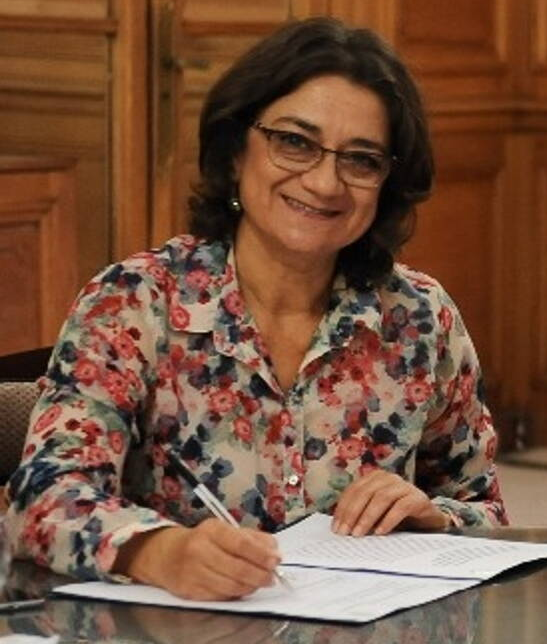

National Senator
- Incumbent
- Assumed office 10 December 2021
- Constituency: Catamarca
- In office 12 October 2009 – 9 December 2011
- Constituency: Catamarca

National Deputy
- In office 10 December 2019 – 10 December 2021
- Constituency: Catamarca

Governor of Catamarca
- In office 9 December 2011 – 9 December 2019
- Vice Governor: Dalmacio Mera
- Preceded by: Eduardo Brizuela del Moral
- Succeeded by: Raúl Jalil

Vice Governor of Catamarca
- In office 9 December 2007 – 9 December 2009
- Governor: Eduardo Brizuela del Moral
- Preceded by: Hernán Colombo
- Succeeded by: Marta Grimaux

Personal details
- Born: 4 December 1959 (age 66) San Fernando del Valle de Catamarca, Argentina
- Party: Justicialist Party
- Other political affiliations: Front for Victory (until 2019); Frente de Todos (since 2019)
- Spouse: Ángel Mercado
- Education: National University of Córdoba
- Occupation: Surgeon

Lucía Benigna Corpacci (born 4 December 1959) is an Argentine physician and politician. A member of the Justicialist Party, she was governor of Catamarca Province from 2011 to 2019, the first female governor in Catamarca and the fourth female governor of a province in Argentina.

From 2019 to 2021 she has been a member of the Argentine Chamber of Deputies, and since 2021 she is a National Senator representing Catamarca.

== Early life and career ==
Born on 4 December 1959 in San Fernando del Valle de Catamarca, Corpacci is of Italian and Lebanese descent. Her mother comes from the Saadi family, a prominent political family in Catamarca. She studied Primary and Secondary education at the Colegio del Carmen and San José in the capital of Catamarca. After finishing high school, she enrolled at the National University of Córdoba, graduating with a medical surgeon degree in 1982.

She held an internship at the Rawson Hospital in Córdoba for a year, and later worked at the Francisco Javier Muñiz Hospital in the Buenos Aires. There she specialized in infectious diseases, and graduated as Infectologist in 1986. At Hospital Muñiz, she worked as an intensive care physician between 1984 and 1988.

Returning to Catamarca, she entered the first cohort of the Faculty of Health Sciences of the National University of Catamarca, where she completed a master's degree in endemic diseases. Between 1988 and 2000, she worked in the Infectology Service of the Hospital Interzonal San Juan Bautista, where she assumes the headship. At the same time, she performs functions in the areas of Guard and the Intensive Care Unit of the hospital. In 1998, she won by academic contest the title of the Chair of Microbiology of the Faculty of Health Sciences of the National University of Catamarca.

During 2002, she was in charge of the Centro Único de Referencia (CUR), which operates at the San Juan Bautista Interzonal Hospital. It is the only center dedicated to the treatment and study of AIDS in the province. Later she is summoned to exercise the direction of the Unit of Management 24, Delegation Catamarca of PAMI, task that fulfills between the years 2003 and 2005.

== Political career ==
In 2005, she was appointed by the National Government as Director of the Reference Center of the Ministry of Social Development in Catamarca, task which she carried out until 2007.

In 2005, she was a national deputy candidate in the second place of the candidates list. In 2007, she is a candidate for Vice Governor of the Province of Catamarca and is elected, becoming the first woman in history to access such a high office by popular decision. She is the first woman to preside over the Legislative Assembly, and also the first to hold the Presidency of the NOA Parliament, a regional deliberative body that brings together representatives of the provinces of Catamarca, Salta, Jujuy, Tucumán, Salta and Santiago del Estero.

In 2009 she is elected National Senator by Catamarca, and assumes her seat in the Congress of the Nation. In 2011, she is postulated to the Governorate, and wins the elections, becoming the first woman in the history of the Province of Catamarca who comes to office through popular vote.

She develops a government policy that highlights the recovery of public services, an unprecedented plan of housing construction, schools, hospitals and routes. It establishes the development of mining as a State policy, and creates a state mining company that is a model in the rest of the country.

As Governor, she emphasizes social policies, and promotes an historical Reform of the Constitution of the Province to end the privileges of the political class. She is President of the Partido Justicialista of Catamarca and vice-president of the National Council of the Partido Justicialista.

In 2015, she is once again elected Governor, winning by a much wider margin than the one that established her in 2011, obtaining the most votes ever assembled in Catamarca by any candidate.

Mother of family, she is the political leader in the Province of Catamarca.

| Preceded by Eduardo Brizuela del Moral | Governor of Catamarca; 9 December 2011–9 December 2019 | Succeeded by Raúl Jalil |
