= Andrés Zottos =

Argentine politician

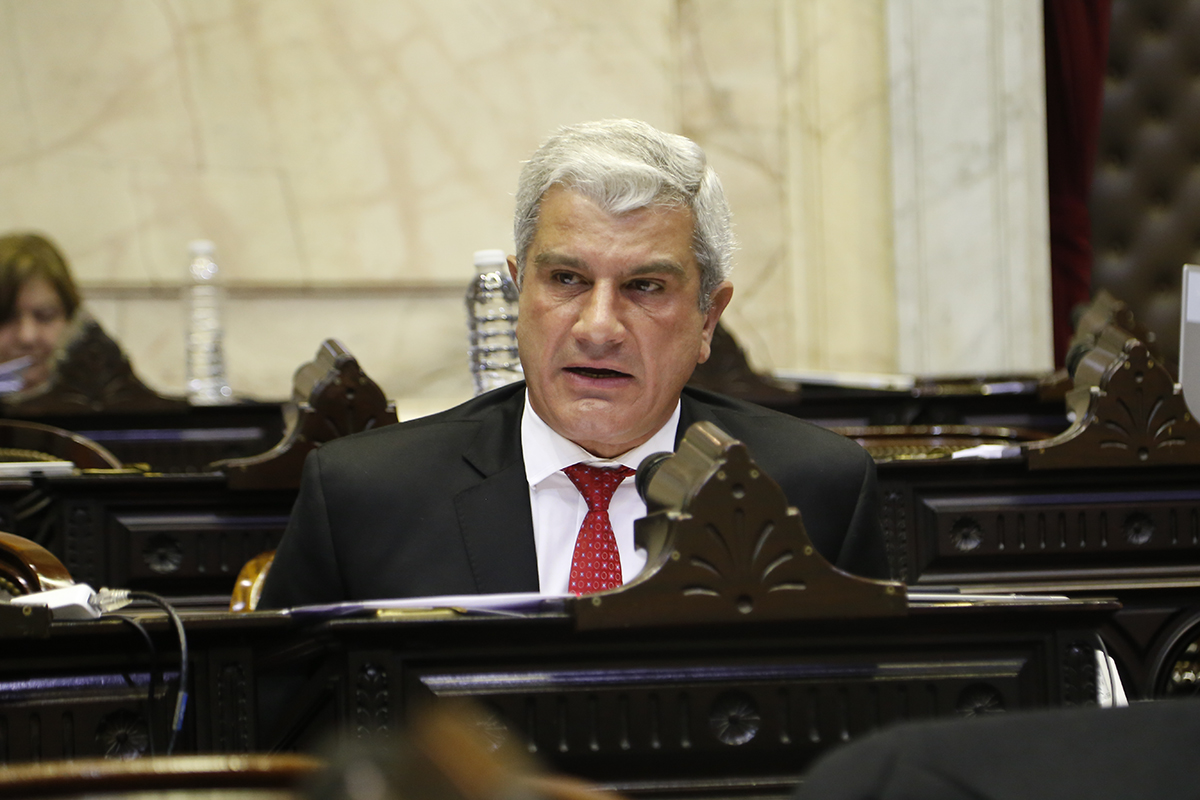

National Deputy
- In office 10 December 2017 – 10 December 2021
- Constituency: Salta
- In office 10 December 2001 – 10 December 2007
- Constituency: Salta

Provincial Senator of Salta
- In office 10 December 2015 – 10 December 2017
- Constituency: General San Martín Department

Vice Governor of Salta
- In office 10 December 2007 – 10 December 2015
- Governor: Juan Manuel Urtubey
- Preceded by: Walter Wayar
- Succeeded by: Miguel Isa

Provincial Deputy of Salta
- In office 10 December 1995 – 10 December 2001
- Constituency: General San Martín Department

Personal details
- Born: 30 December 1961 (age 64) Tartagal, Salta Province, Argentina
- Party: Salta Renewal Party

Miguel Andrés Costas Zottos (born 30 December 1961) is an Argentine politician who served as a National Deputy elected in Salta Province from 2017 to 2021. A member of the localist Salta Renewal Party, Zottos previously served in both houses of the Salta Legislature, and as Vice Governor of Salta under Juan Manuel Urtubey from 2007 to 2015.

== Early life ==
Zottos was born on 30 December 1961 in Tartagal, Salta Province, to a family of Greek Cypriot descent. He was raised in the Greek Orthodox faith, and married into the Greek Orthodox Church of Antioch with Marisa Yudi, of Syrian descent. He finished high school at the Escuela de Comercio Alejandro Agüado in Tartagal, and has an unfinished degree on economics from the National University of Salta.

== Political career ==
Zottos began his career in 1992 as Undersecretary of Border Areas in the Salta city government; he then went on to serve as a member of the Tartagal City Council. In 1993, he briefly served as interim mayor of Tartagal. In 1995 he was elected to the Salta Province Chamber of Deputies, representing the General San Martín Department; he was president of the Salta Renewal Party parliamentary bloc in the Chamber starting in 1999. Zottos was elected to the Argentine Chamber of Deputies in 2001.

Zottos was the running mate of Juan Manuel Urtubey at the 2007 gubernatorial election in Salta; the ticket won with 46.39% of the popular vote, and Urtubey was elected. Both Urtubey and Zottos were sworn in on 10 December 2007. The Urtubey-Zottos ticket was re-elected in 2011, this time with 59.57% of the vote.

Although Urtubey sought and won a third term in 2015, Zottos did not run for re-election alongside him. Instead, he ran for a seat in the Provincial Senate.

Zottos ran for the Argentine Chamber of Deputies again in the 2017 legislative election, this time as the first candidate in the "Unity and Renewal Front" list. The list became the second-most voted, with 24.44% (behind Cambiemos—PAIS's 30.25%), and Zottos was elected. He took office on 6 December 2017. As deputy, Zottos formed part of the Bloque Justicialista parliamentary bloc from 2017 to 2019, and later presided the bloc within the Interbloque Federal from 2019 to 2021.
