= Juan Carlos Bacileff Ivanoff =

Argentine politician

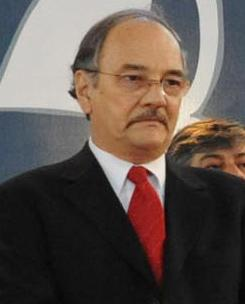

Governor of Chaco
- Interim
- In office 20 November 2013 – 26 February 2015
- Preceded by: Jorge Capitanich
- Succeeded by: Jorge Capitanich

Vice Governor of Chaco
- In office 10 December 2007 – 10 December 2015
- Governor: Jorge Capitanich
- Preceded by: Eduardo Moro
- Succeeded by: Daniel Capitanich

Personal details
- Born: Juan Carlos Bacileff Ivanoff; 1 January 1949 (age 77) Castelli, Chaco Province, Argentina
- Party: Justicialist Party

Juan Carlos Bacileff Ivanoff (born 1 January 1949) is an Argentine politician who served as interim governor of Chaco Province from 2013 to 2015. He was vice governor of Chaco from 2007 to 2015, serving under Jorge Capitanich; upon Capitanich's appointment as Cabinet Chief of Argentina in November 2013, Bacileff Ivanoff stepped in as governor in interim position until Capitanich's dismissal in February 2015.

From 2001 to 2005, he was a member of the provincial Chamber of Deputies for the Justicialist Party.

== Early life and career ==
Juan Carlos Bacileff Ivanoff was born on 1 January 1949 in Juan José Castelli, Chaco Province. He is of Bulgarian descent. He worked as a lawyer in Resistencia until 2001, when he ran for a seat in the provincial Chamber of Deputies.

He was Jorge Capitanich's running mate in the 2007 gubernatorial election; the ticket won and Bacileff Ivanoff was sworn in on 10 December 2007. The same ticket ran for re-election in 2011, winning again.

On 20 November 2013, Capitanich was appointed Chief of the Cabinet of Ministers by President Cristina Fernández de Kirchner. Capitanich asked for a leave from his post as governor, which was granted by the Provincial Legislature. The granting of the leave meant Capitanich would not resign from the governorship, and instead, Bacileff Ivanoff would take his place in interim fashion while Capitanich served in the national government.

Capitanich was dismissed from the Cabinet Chief Office on 25 February 2015, and the following day, he returned to the governorship, taking over from Bacileff Ivanoff once again. Bacileff Ivanoff did not run for a third term as vice governor, and was succeeded by Capitanich's brother, Daniel Capitanich, on 10 December 2015.

Bacileff Ivanoff ran for the governorship in the 2019 general election in the Frente Integrador ticket. He landed third with 13.91% of the vote, behind Capitanich (who won his third term) and the UCR's Carim Peche.

Political offices
Preceded by Eduardo Moro	Vice Governor of Chaco; 2007–2015	Succeeded by Daniel Capitanich
Preceded by Jorge Capitanich	Governor of Chaco; Interim; 2013–2015	Succeeded by Jorge Capitanich
