= Francisco Pérez (governor) =

Argentine politician (born 1969)

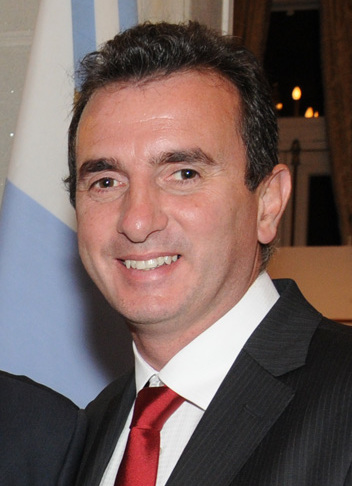

Governor of Mendoza
- In office 9 December 2011 – 10 December 2015
- Lieutenant: Carlos Ciurca
- Preceded by: Celso Jaque
- Succeeded by: Alfredo Cornejo

Minister of Infrastructure for Mendoza Province
- In office 10 December 2007 – 9 December 2011
- Succeeded by: Rolando Baldasso

Personal details
- Born: May 15, 1967 (age 59) San Salvador de Jujuy
- Party: Justicialist Party/Front for Victory
- Spouse: Celina Sánchez
- Education: National University of the Littoral
- Profession: Lawyer

Francisco Pérez (born May 9, 1969) is an Argentine lawyer and politician elected Governor of Mendoza Province in 2011.

== Biography ==
Pérez was born in San Salvador de Jujuy, in 1969, to María Ercilia and Francisco Pérez. His father, with whom he shared his nickname ("Paco"), was a dentist who would be elected Mayor of San Pedro de Jujuy; the young Pérez lost his mother at age five. He enrolled at the National University of the Littoral, and earned a Law Degree in 1997; while still in Law School, he was appointed Legislative Secretary to the Mendoza Province Justicialist Party caucus participating in the historic, 1994 Constitutional Amendments Convention. He married Celina Sánchez, with whom he had two children.

He established a private law practice in 1998 in Mendoza, specializing in family, probate, and labor law. He also served as legal adviser to the Provincial Health and Social Services Ministry, the Cattle Ranching Directorate, and the Consulate of Bolivia in Mendoza in subsequent years. Pérez was appointed Undersecretary of Labor for the Santiago del Estero Province with interim Governor Pablo Lanusse following a Federal intervention order signed in 2004. He returned to Mendoza the following year, and in 2007, left his private practice to accept a post as Minister of Infrastructure for the newly elected Governor Celso Jaque.

Pérez became one of the most influential members of Governor Jaque's cabinet. He not only oversaw the province's public works, but also shaped its energy and mining policy. His closest ally in the Federal Government was the Director of ANSES, Diego Bossio; Bossio, like Pérez, had been an adviser for Jaque.

Pérez was nominated to run for governor on the Front for Victory ticket ahead of elections in 2011; he chose the province's Development Minister, Carlos Ciurca, as his running mate. Their ticket was elected on October 23 with 42.8% of the vote, defeating their main rival, former Governor Roberto Iglesias of the UCR, by over 8%. His first major policy proposal as governor was to advance an open source governance initiative in a bill which included provisions for a system of petitions and referendums, as well as public consultation boards.

Preceded by Celso Jaque	Governor of Mendoza; 2011–2015	Succeeded by Alfredo Cornejo
