= Floro Bogado =

Argentine politician, lawyer and diplomat

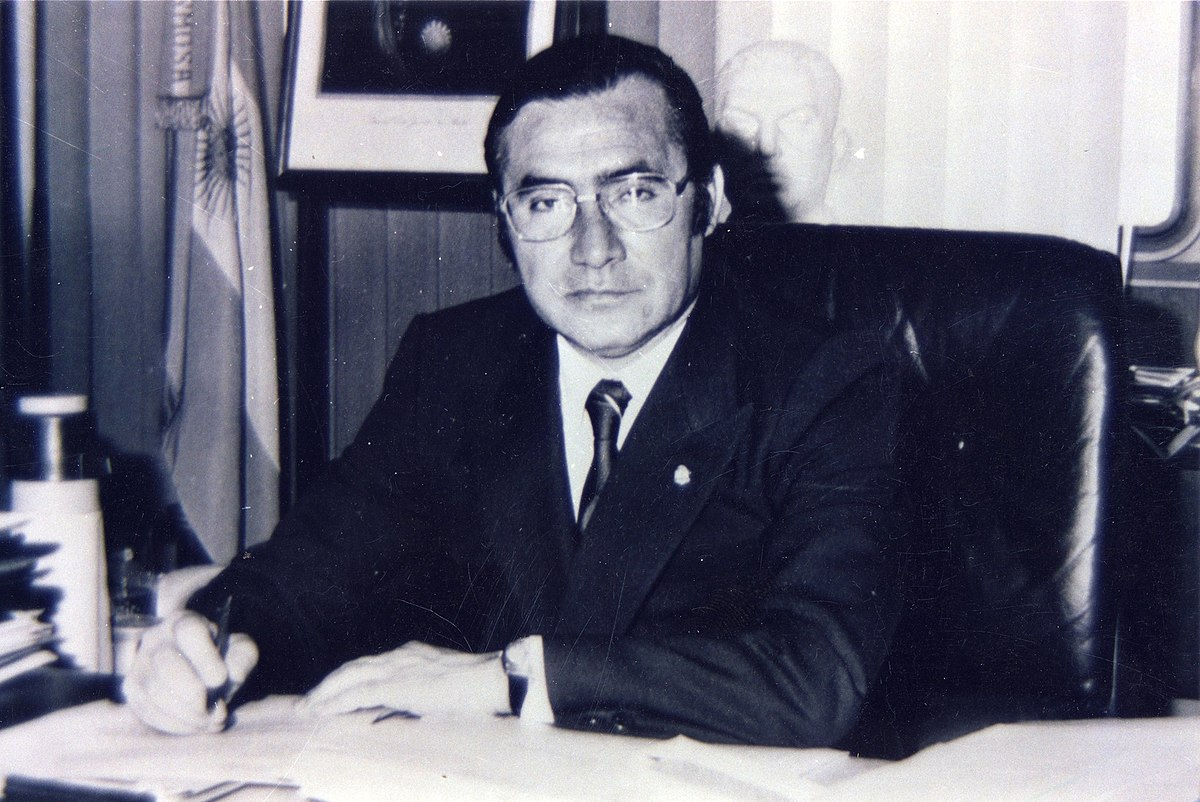

Vice Governor of Formosa
- In office December 10, 1995 – December 12, 2017
- Governor: Gildo Insfrán
- Preceded by: Gildo Insfrán
- Succeeded by: Eber Solís

Argentine Ambassador to Paraguay
- In office 1989–1991

National Deputy
- In office 1987–1989
- Constituency: Formosa

Governor of Formosa
- In office 1983–1987
- Succeeded by: Vicente Joga

Personal details
- Born: February 20, 1939 Formosa, Argentina
- Died: December 12, 2017 (aged 78)
- Party: Justicialist Party
- Spouse: Adriana Bortolozzi
- Profession: Lawyer

Floro Eleuterio Bogado (February 20, 1939 – December 12, 2017) was an Argentine Justicialist Party politician, lawyer and diplomat. He served as Vice-Governor of Formosa Province under Gildo Insfrán from 1995 to 2017, and was Governor from 1983 to 1987, as well as a national legislator.

Bogado was born in Formosa, Argentina, and educated in Formosa and in San Lorenzo, Santa Fe. He studied law at the University of Buenos Aires and the National University of the Littoral. He was a teacher and lecturer at the National Northeastern University and held senior posts in the provincial and national Justicialist Party chapters.

Bogado was elected governor of his province in 1983, and at the end of his term in 1987 he was elected to the Chamber of Deputies. He took leave in 1989 to accept an appointment as Argentine Ambassador to Paraguay, but returned to Congress in 1991. Bogado was elected to the National Constitutional Reform Assembly. The following year he was elected vice-governor as Insfrán's running mate.

His wife Adriana Bortolozzi is a member of the Argentine Senate and their son, Adrián Floro Bogado, is a provincial deputy.

He died on December 12, 2017, at the age of 78.
