= Governor of Catamarca Province =

Political office in Argentina

- Arms of Catamarca

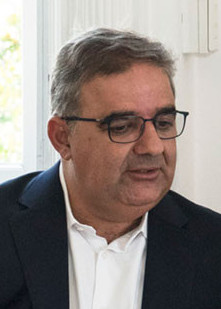
- Incumbent; Raúl Jalil since 10 December 2019
- Appointer: Direct popular vote
- Term length: 4 years
- Inaugural holder: Nicolás Avellaneda y Tula

The Governor of Catamarca is a citizen of Catamarca Province, Argentina, holding the office of governor for the corresponding period. The governor is elected alongside a vice-governor. Currently the governor of Catamarca is Raúl Jalil.

== Governors since 1983 ==
Governor	Term in office	Party	Election	Vice Governor
Ramón Saadi	10 December 1983 – 10 December 1987	PJ	1983	Rodolfo Morán
Vicente Saadi	10 December 1987 – 10 July 1988	PJ	1987	Oscar Garbe
Oscar Garbe	10 July 1988 – 10 December 1988	PJ	1987	Vacant
Ramón Saadi	10 December 1988 – 17 April 1991	PJ	1988	Oscar Garbe
Luis Prol (Federal Interventor)	17 April 1991 – 10 December 1991	Independent	1988	—N/a
Arnoldo Castillo	10 December 1991 – 10 December 1999	UCR	1991	Simón Hernández
Arnoldo Castillo	10 December 1991 – 10 December 1999	UCR	1995	Simón Hernández
Oscar Castillo	10 December 1999 – 10 December 2003	UCR	1999	Hernán Colombo
Eduardo Brizuela del Moral	10 December 2003 – 10 December 2011	UCR	2003	Hernán Colombo
Eduardo Brizuela del Moral	10 December 2003 – 10 December 2011	UCR	2007	Lucía Corpacci
Eduardo Brizuela del Moral	10 December 2003 – 10 December 2011	UCR	2007	Marta Grimaux
Lucía Corpacci	10 December 2011 – 10 December 2019	PJ	2011	Dalmacio Mera
Lucía Corpacci	10 December 2011 – 10 December 2019	PJ	2015	Octavio Gutiérrez
Lucía Corpacci	10 December 2011 – 10 December 2019	PJ	2015	Jorge Solá Jais
Raúl Jalil	10 December 2019 – Incumbent	PJ	2019	Rubén Dusso

== See also ==
- Legislature of Catamarca
  - Senate of Catamarca
  - Chamber of Deputies of Catamarca
