= Governor of Formosa Province =

- Provincial coat of Arms

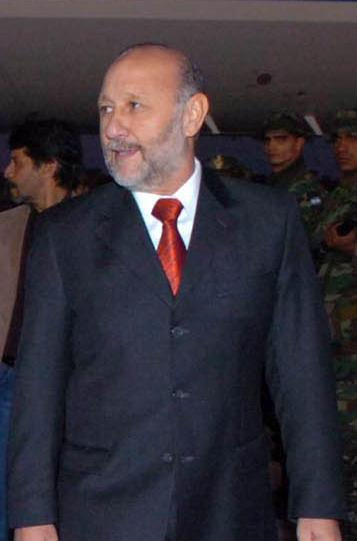
- Incumbent; Gildo Insfrán since 10 December 1995
- Appointer: Direct popular vote
- Term length: 4 years
- Inaugural holder: Carlos Alfredo García Cuerva

The Governor of Formosa (Spanish: Gobernador de la Provincia de Formosa) is a citizen of the Formosa Province, in Argentina, holding the office of governor for the corresponding period. The governor is elected alongside a vice-governor. Since 1995, the governor of Formosa has been Gildo Insfrán. Having held office uninterruptedly for 30 years now, Insfrán is the longest-serving governor currently in office in Argentina.

== Governors since 1983 ==
| Governor | Term in office | Party | Election | Vice Governor |
|---|---|---|---|---|
| Floro Bogado | 10 December 1983 – 10 December 1987 | PJ | 1983 | Lisbel Rivira |
| Vicente Joga | 10 December 1987 – 10 December 1995 | PJ | 1987 | Gildo Insfrán |
| Vicente Joga | 10 December 1987 – 10 December 1995 | PJ | 1991 | Gildo Insfrán |
| Gildo Insfrán | 10 December 1995 – Incumbent | PJ | 1995 | Floro Bogado |
| Gildo Insfrán | 10 December 1995 – Incumbent | PJ | 1999 | Floro Bogado |
| Gildo Insfrán | 10 December 1995 – Incumbent | PJ | 2003 | Floro Bogado |
| Gildo Insfrán | 10 December 1995 – Incumbent | PJ | 2007 | Floro Bogado |
| Gildo Insfrán | 10 December 1995 – Incumbent | PJ | 2011 | Floro Bogado |
| Gildo Insfrán | 10 December 1995 – Incumbent | PJ | 2015 | Floro Bogado |
| Gildo Insfrán | 10 December 1995 – Incumbent | PJ | 2019 | Eber Wilson Solís |

== See also ==
- Chamber of Deputies of Formosa
