= Juan Manuel Urtubey =

Argentine lawyer and politician

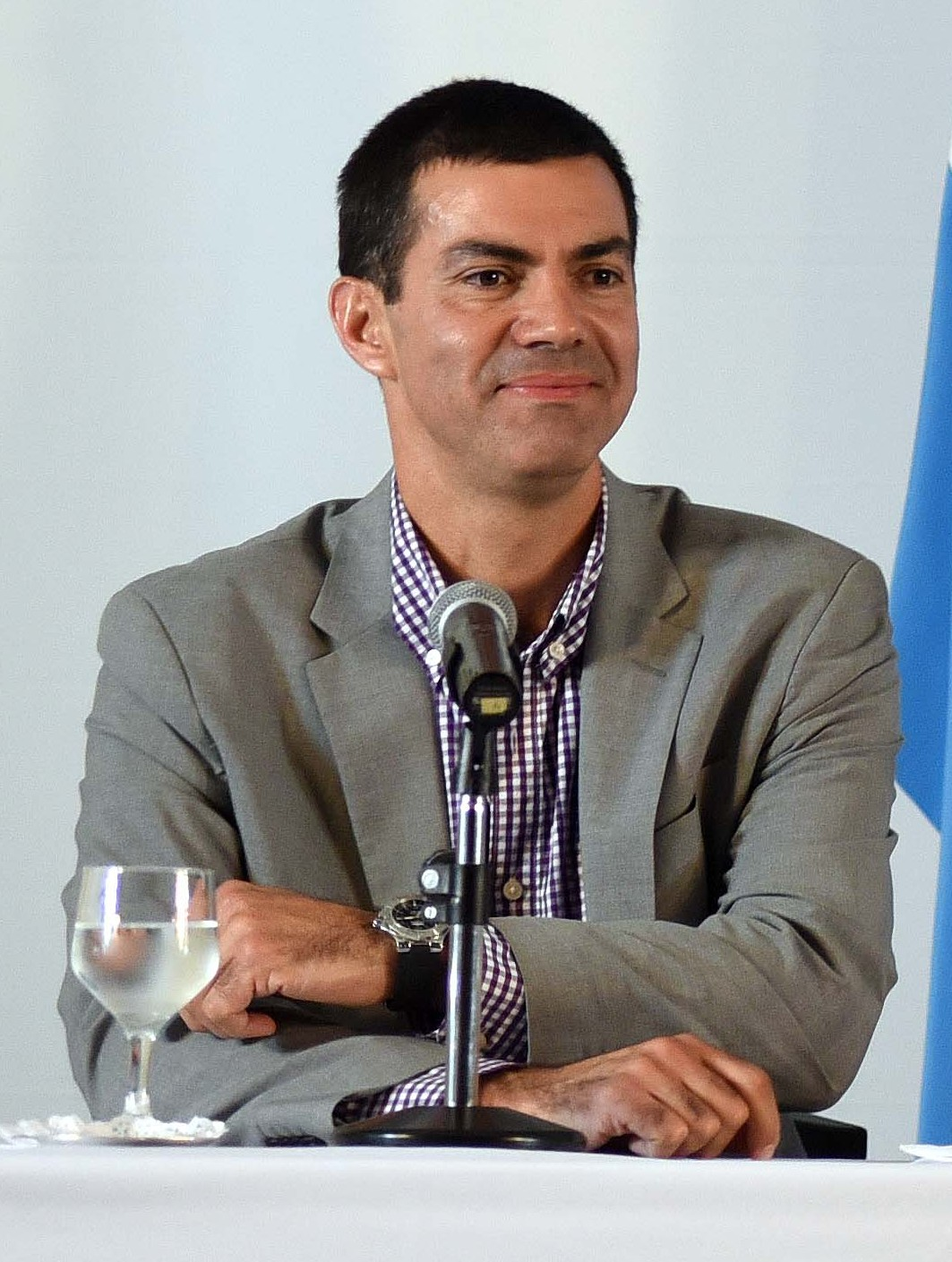

Governor of Salta
- In office December 10, 2007 – December 10, 2019
- Vice Governor: Andrés Zottos; Miguel Isa
- Preceded by: Juan Carlos Romero
- Succeeded by: Gustavo Sáenz

Personal details
- Born: Juan Manuel Urtubey Mera; September 6, 1969 (age 57) Salta, Argentina
- Party: Justicialist Party
- Other political affiliations: Federal Consensus (2019-present); Front for Victory (2007-2015)
- Spouse: Isabel Macedo (m. 2016)
- Children: 5
- Education: University of Buenos Aires
- Profession: Lawyer

Juan Manuel Urtubey (born September 6, 1969) is an Argentine politician, lawyer, university professor and former governor of Salta Province. Formerly a senior figure in the ruling Front for Victory faction of the Justicialist Party (PJ) in the Argentine Chamber of Deputies and chairman of both the Constitutional Affairs Committee and the Peronist Caucus, Urtubey became governor in the 2007 elections, being only 38 years old. He was reelected in 2011 with almost 60% of the vote, and in 2015 with 51% of the vote.

He ran for vice president as the running mate of Roberto Lavagna in the 2019 general election under the Federal Consensus alliance, winning 6.14% of the popular vote.

== Biography ==
Urtubey was born in Salta City on September 6, 1969, the eight of ten brothers, being his father, Rodolfo Urtubey a lawyer and his mother a notary. His father is a former president of the Supreme Court of the Salta Province.

He completed his elementary studies at Escuela Parroquial de la Merced, and his high school studies at Bachillerato Humanista Moderno.

When young, he played rugby at Jockey Club of Salta, and was part of the U-19 Salta Province rugby team.

Since young, he developed interest for political activities, and took his uncle, Julio Mera Figueroa, a peronist politician as a mentor.

He studied law at University of Buenos Aires, completing his studies in only three years.

He is married to Ximena Saravia Toledo, and has four children: Marcos (1994), Lucas (1997), Mateo (2000) and Juana (2003).

He is brother to José Urtubey, manager of the Argentine Industrial Union; Rodolfo Urtubey, national senator; and Alejandro Urtubey, businessman and former airplane pilot.

In addition, Urtubey is a law professor at the National University of Salta.

== Political career ==
During the Juan Carlos Romero administration of Salta Province, he became Secretary of State of Salta Province in 1995, moving to become provincial government spokesman in 1996. In 1997 he was elected provincial congressman until 1999. In that office he was elected as chairman of General Law Committee.

In 1999 he was elected National Deputy and served as Constitution Affairs Committee chairman for 5 years (2002–2007), as secretary of other two committees and Justicialist Party (PJ) caucus chairman.

Due to his legislative activity during his eight years in Congress, he was chosen five times as one of the ten most active congressmen. His most important activities were to be co-author of the Obediencia Debida and Punto Final laws, that helped to pursue last military coup crimes against humanity.

In 2003 he was elected member for the Constituent assembly in the context of Salta Province constitutional reform.

Since 1998 he has been dean of the Public Administration School, under the Government of the Salta province which intends to educate and permanently train public employees.

In 2007 he was elected Governor of the Province of Salta for the Frente Para la Victoria party, defeating by a very low margin Walter Waynar, candidate supported by the former governor, Juan Carlos Romero.

In 2011 he was re-elected governor. In this time he obtained 60% of votes, over 25,64% of his opponent Alfredo Olmedo.

Urtubey has heavily supported minority rights expansion, becoming, for example, one of the main supporters of LGBT rights in Argentina. He is also a member of Washington D.C.–based think tank, The Inter-American Dialogue.

He has publicly stated his intention to run for President of Argentina in the 2015 elections and the press has also speculated about him running as vice-president of either of the candidates Daniel Scioli and Sergio Massa. He ran instead for reelection as governor, defeating Romero and staying for the 2015 to 2019 period.

=== Summary of his political career ===
- Elected Governor of the Province of Salta 2011–2015.
- Elected Governor of the Province of Salta 2007–2010.
- National Congressman 1999–2007:

- Chamber of Deputies Constitution Affairs Committee chairman 2002–2007.
- Secretary of the following congressional committees: Penal Law and Sports.
- Member of the following congressional committees: Budget and Economy, Communications and IT, Justice, Petitions, Addiction Prevention and drug trafficking, Social Security, Energy, Small and Medium Businesses, Freedom of Expression and Special Committee for the control of the works at Río Bermejo.
- Member of the Ombudsman bi-cameral committee.
- Argentine representative for the Human Rights Committee of the Latin-American Parliament.
- Justicialist Party caucus chairman of the Argentine Chamber of Deputies 2005–2007.

- Member of the Constituent assembly of the Province of Salta in 2003.
- Provincial Secretary of the Justicialist Party in the Province of Salta 2002–2006.
- Secretary of International Relationships of the Justicialist Party in the Province of Salta 2002–2006.
- Dean of the Public Management School since 1998.
- Provincial deputy for the Capital Department, Salta Province 1997–1999.
- General Law committee chairman in the Provincial Chamber of deputies 1997–1999.
- Secretary of Press - provincial spokesman. Salta Province 1996–1997.
- Secretary of State of the Province of Salta 1995–1996.

== Political profile ==
Juan Manuel Urtubey is critic of his predecessor, Juan Carlos Romero, to whom he blames faults in his administration that constituted many of the problems for the incumbent government. He qualified Juan Carlos Romero, former vice-president candidate to Carlos Menem, as the leader of a "pseudo-feudal regime" and head of the "old politics".

In a national level, Urtubey is a member of the Justicialist Party (PJ), having been PJ Caucus Chairman when being national deputy. In spite of his alliance to the current Argentine President Cristina Fernández de Kirchner he was always noticed for publicly criticizing National Government's actions, decisions and policies he opposed to. In this line he criticized the "personalist" characteristic of Kirchnerism and opposed the re-election of Cristina Fernandez de Kirchner. Urtubey keeps a tense relationship with the newspaper El Tribuno, owned by former governor Romero, political opponent of Urtubey. This newspaper does not only criticizes permanently Urtubey's office, but has also provenly invented news. One of those examples is an article that narrated the story of "an extremly [sic] poor mother that boiled a rock to look as she was cooking while her famished sons went to sleep", with an illustrative picture. Not later, it was proved that this picture was taken from a Mexican Newspaper that recounted that story that happened in Honduras.

Urtubey had been frequently criticized for his extravagant way of life that includes sport motorcycle riding, or bungee jumping from the highest building in Auckland.

He has been always close to Jorge Bergoglio, far before to his election as Catholic Church Pope. However, obeyed the Pope's will when he asked Argentinians "to avoid traveling to Rome, but give away that money to poor people".

== Government of Salta 2007–2011 ==
In 2007 he was elected Governor of Salta with 45,47% of votes.

=== Economy ===
In many ways, Urtubey followed his predecessor's economic policy: he encouraged international investment, encouraged exports, improved land and air communications between Salta Province and the rest of the county, improved tax policies and invested in infrastructure.

However, in many aspects, his economic policy was innovative for the Province: he renewed the public employee payroll as to include in the provincial Government trained youth force from every social strata.

In 2009, he nationalized the Provincial Water Supply Company, as to improve access to drinking water.

In 2010, the province took control of the Materno Infantil Hospital, which was controversially privatized by former governor Juan Carlos Romero.

To promote international tourism, the Urtubey administration supported major sport events in the province. For example, the Los Pumas national rugby team hosted a test match against England in the province. In 2010, the Rally Dakar raced across the Salta Province.

=== Democracy ===
With Urtubey in office, Salta Province became the first Province in Argentina to use Electronic voting which benefits electoral transparency and accelerates vote counting. This system in particular, was praised by international observers. Doctor Nestor Pedro Sagüés, constitutional law expert and professor, concluded that electronic voting in Salta satisfies the conditions recommended by the Constitutional Court of Germany.

=== Controversies ===
==== New education law and religious education ====
In 1886, Catholic education was imposed in the province. Since then, only three Argentine provinces (Salta, Jujuy and Santiago del Estero) have been the only ones in which Catholic education is compulsory.

In 2008, during Juan Manuel Urtubey government, the Provincial Congress modified these laws. The new laws established religious education in every provincial school without distinction of belief. This, was criticized by many sectors, that demanded complete banning of religious education in public Schools. In spite of the criticism, it was declared constitutional by the Provincial Supreme Court.

==== Human rights ====
In 2011, many political factions criticized former governor Juan Carlos Romero, current governor Urtubey and other political movements in Salta due to opinions and policies regarding LGBT minorities. They demanded Urtubey abolition of laws that banned prostitution.

However, in 2013, Urtubey's office was praised by diverse LGTB organizations by transforming Salta into one of the first provinces to accept gender identity.

In March, 2012, after the ruling of the Argentine Supreme Court, Salta became the first province to regulate non punishable abortion. Urtubey authorized this law in spite of his personal beliefs.

== Government of Salta 2011–2015 ==
=== Historic Reparation Fund ===
On November 17, 2011, encouraged by Governor Urtubey, the provincial congress passed the law number 7651 that created the Historic Reparation Fund for the North of the Province of Salta. This law authorized to destine u$s 220.000.000 to finance an Infrastructure Plan for the Departments of Oran, San Martín and Rivadavia. This funds are used to finance infrastructured agreed by the provincial and municipal governments.

The Historic Reparation Fund, "breaks the negative intromission of sectors that don't represent institutions" as well as benefiting "the long forgotten people of Salta" by creating infrastructure and jobs.

=== Tourism ===
Since his second provincial government, Urtubey works together with Daniel Scioli, governor of Buenos Aires Province in the area of tourism.

== Publications ==
- Sembrando Progreso. Claves del Desarrollo de Salta. Ed. Hanne, 1999. ISBN 987-9140-44-3.
- Invited columnist in newspapers and magazines of Argentina, Chile and Brasil.
- "La Escuela", Public Administration School Magazine (Editor).
- "Argentina 2020-Propuestas para profundizar la transformación". Compilator Nicolás Trotta. Ed. Lumiere, 2006. ISBN 987-603-013-2

Preceded by Juan Carlos Romero	Governor of Salta; 2007–2019	Succeeded by Gustavo Sáenz
