= Governor of Salta Province =

- Coat of arms of Salta Province

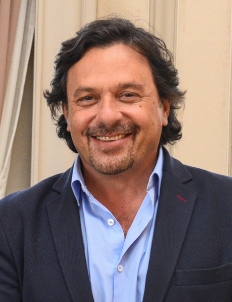
- Incumbent; Gustavo Sáenz since 10 December 2015
- Appointer: Direct popular vote
- Term length: 4 years
- Inaugural holder: Hilarión de la Quintana

The governor of Salta (Spanish: Gobernador de la Provincia de Salta) is a citizen of the Salta Province, in Argentina, holding the office of governor for the corresponding period. The governor is elected alongside a vice-governor. Currently the governor of Salta is Gustavo Sáenz.

== Governors since 1983 ==
Governor	Term in office	Party	Election	Vice Governor
Roberto Romero	10 December 1983 – 10 December 1987	PJ	1983	Hernán Figueroa
Hernán Cornejo	10 December 1987 – 10 December 1991	PJ	1987	Pedro de los Ríos
Roberto Ulloa	10 December 1991 – 10 December 1995	PRS	1991	Ricardo Gómez Diez
Juan Carlos Romero	10 December 1995 – 10 December 2007	PJ	1995	Walter Wayar
Juan Carlos Romero	10 December 1995 – 10 December 2007	PJ	1999	Walter Wayar
Juan Carlos Romero	10 December 1995 – 10 December 2007	PJ	2003	Walter Wayar
Juan Manuel Urtubey	10 December 2007 – 10 December 2019	PJ	2007	Andrés Zottos
Juan Manuel Urtubey	10 December 2007 – 10 December 2019	PJ	2011	Andrés Zottos
Juan Manuel Urtubey	10 December 2007 – 10 December 2019	PJ	2015	Miguel Isa
Gustavo Sáenz	10 December 2019 – Incumbent	PAIS	2019	Antonio Marocco

== See also ==
- Legislature of Salta
  - Senate of Salta
  - Chamber of Deputies of Salta
