= List of Argentine senators, 2005–2007 =

This is a list of members of the Argentine Senate from 10 December 2005 to 9 December 2007.

== Composition ==
as of 9 December 2007

Bloc	Seats	Leader
Front for Victory–PJ	26	Miguel Ángel Pichetto
Justicialist Party	17	
Radical Civic Union	15	Gerardo Morales
Civic and Social Front of Catamarca	2	Oscar Castillo
Front for the Renewal of Concord	2	Eduardo Torres
Republican Force	2	Carlos Salazar
Neuquén People's Movement	2	Pedro Salvatori
Frepaso	1	Vilma Ibarra
New Front	1	Carlos Rossi
Production and Labour	1	Roberto Basualdo
Salta Renewal Party	1	Ricardo Gómez Diez
Socialist Party	1	Rubén Giustiniani
Union for Córdoba	1	Roberto Urquía
Source: senado.gov.ar (archive)

== Senate leadership ==
Title	Officeholder	Bloc	Province
President of the Senate (Note: Ex officio as Vice President of Argentina.)	Daniel Scioli	Front for Victory–PJ	Buenos Aires Province
Provisional President	José Pampuro	Front for Victory–PJ	Buenos Aires Province
Vice President	Marcelo López Arias	Front for Victory–PJ	Salta
First Vice President	Mirian Curletti	Radical Civic Union	Chaco
Second Vice President	Roberto Basualdo	Production and Labour	San Juan

== Election cycles ==
Election	Term	
Election	Start	End
2001	10 December 2001	9 December 2007
2003	10 December 2003	9 December 2009
2005	10 December 2005	9 December 2011

== List of senators ==
Province	Senator	Party	Term	
Province	Senator	Party	From	To
Buenos Aires Province	Cristina Elisabet Fernández de Kirchner	Front for Victory–PJ	2005	2007 (Note: Resigned on 9 December 2007 to take office as President of Argentina. Replaced by Eric Calcagno.)
Buenos Aires Province	Hilda Beatriz González de Duhalde	Justicialist Party	2005	2011
Buenos Aires Province	José Juan Bautista Pampuro	Front for Victory–PJ	2005	2011
Buenos Aires	Vilma Lidia Ibarra	Frepaso	2001	2007
Buenos Aires	María Laura Leguizamón	Front for Victory–PJ	2003 (Note: Since 10 December 2003. Replaced Gustavo Béliz, who never took office.)	2007
Buenos Aires	Rodolfo Terragno	Radical Civic Union	2001	2007
Catamarca	Oscar Aníbal Castillo	Civic and Social Front of Catamarca	2003	2009
Catamarca	María Teresita del Valle Colombo de Acevedo	Civic and Social Front of Catamarca	2003	2009
Catamarca	Ramón Eduardo Saadi	Justicialist Party	2003	2009
Chaco	Jorge Milton Capitanich	Front for Victory–PJ	2001	2007
Chaco	Mirian Belén Curletti	Radical Civic Union	2001	2007
Chaco	Alicia Ester Mastandrea de Illia	Radical Civic Union	2003 (Note: Since 10 December 2003. Replaced Eduardo Moro.)	2007
Chubut	Silvia Ester Giusti	Front for Victory–PJ	2003	2009
Chubut	Marcelo Alejandro Horacio Guinle	Front for Victory–PJ	2003	2009
Chubut	Norberto Massoni	Radical Civic Union	2003	2009
Córdoba	Haide Delia Giri	Justicialist Party	2003	2009
Córdoba	Carlos Alberto Rossi	New Front	2003	2009
Córdoba	Roberto Daniel Urquía	Union for Córdoba	2003	2009
Corrientes	Roberto Fabián Ríos	Justicialist Party	2003	2009
Corrientes	María Dora Sánchez	Radical Civic Union	2003	2009
Corrientes	Isabel Josefa Viudes	Front for Victory–PJ	2006 (Note: Since 15 March 2006. Replaced Raúl Romero Feris.)	2009
Entre Ríos	Graciela Yolanda Bar	Front for Victory–PJ	2001	2007
Entre Ríos	Laura Martínez Pass de Cresto	Front for Victory–PJ	2003 (Note: Since 10 December 2003. Replaced Jorge Busti.)	2007
Entre Ríos	Ricardo César Taffarel	Radical Civic Union	2001	2007
Formosa	Adriana Raquel Bortolozzi	Front for Victory–PJ	2005	2011
Formosa	José Miguel Ángel Mayans	Front for Victory–PJ	2005	2011
Formosa	Luis Carlos Petcoff Naidenoff	Radical Civic Union	2005	2011
Jujuy	Guillermo Raúl Jenefes	Front for Victory–PJ	2005	2011
Jujuy	Liliana Beatriz Fellner	Front for Victory–PJ	2005	2011
Jujuy	Gerardo Rubén Morales	Radical Civic Union	2005	2011
La Pampa	Silvia Ester Gallego	Justicialist Party	2003	2009
La Pampa	Rubén Hugo Marín	Justicialist Party	2003	2009
La Pampa	Juan Carlos Marino	Radical Civic Union	2003	2009
La Rioja	Ada Mercedes Maza	Front for Victory–PJ	2005	2011
La Rioja	Carlos Saúl Menem	Justicialist Party	2005	2011
La Rioja	Teresita Quintela	Front for Victory–PJ	2005	2011
Mendoza	Celso Alejandro Jaque	Front for Victory–PJ	2003	2007 (Note: Resigned on 10 December 2007 to become governor of Mendoza. Replaced by Mónica Troadello.)
Mendoza	María Cristina Perceval	Front for Victory–PJ	2003	2009
Mendoza	Ernesto Sanz	Radical Civic Union	2003	2009
Misiones	Maurice Fabián Closs	Front for the Renewal of Concord	2005	2007 (Note: Resigned on 10 December 2007 to become governor of Misiones. Replaced by Eduardo Torres.)
Misiones	Luis Alberto Viana	Front for Victory–PJ	2005	2011
Misiones	Élida María Vigo	Front for the Renewal of Concord	2005	2011
Neuquén	Sergio Adrián Gallia	Justicialist Party	2001	2007
Neuquén	Pedro Salvatori	Neuquén People's Movement	2001	2007
Neuquén	Luz María Sapag	Neuquén People's Movement	2001	2007
Río Negro	Jacobo Alberto Abrameto	Radical Civic Union	2007 (Note: Since 8 August 2007. Replaced Luis Falcó.)	2007
Río Negro	Amanda Mercedes Isidori	Radical Civic Union	2001	2007
Río Negro	Miguel Ángel Pichetto	Front for Victory–PJ	2001	2007
Salta	Sonia Margarita Escudero	Front for Victory–PJ	2001	2007
Salta	Ricardo Gómez Diez	Salta Renewal Party	2001	2007
Salta	Marcelo Eduardo López Arias	Front for Victory–PJ	2001	2007
San Juan	Roberto Gustavo Basualdo	Production and Labour	2005	2011
San Juan	César Ambrosio Gioja	Front for Victory–PJ	2005	2011
San Juan	Marina Raquel Riofrío	Front for Victory–PJ	2005	2011
San Luis	Liliana Negre de Alonso	Justicialist Party	2005	2011
San Luis	Daniel Raúl Pérsico	Front for Victory–PJ	2005	2011
San Luis	Adolfo Rodríguez Saá	Justicialist Party	2005	2011
Santa Cruz	Alicia Margarita Kirchner	Front for Victory–PJ	2005	2006 (Note: Resigned on 14 August 2006 to become Minister of Social Development. Replaced by Judith Forstmann.)
Santa Cruz	Nicolás Alejandro Fernández	Front for Victory–PJ	2005	2011
Santa Cruz	Selva Judith Forstmann	Front for Victory–PJ	2006 (Note: Since 14 August 2006. Replaced Alicia Kirchner.)	2009 (Note: Died on 10 April 2009. Replaced by Jorge Banicevich.)
Santa Cruz	Alfredo Anselmo Martínez	Radical Civic Union	2005	2011
Santa Fe	Rubén Héctor Giustiniani	Socialist Party	2003	2009
Santa Fe	Roxana Itatí Latorre	Justicialist Party	2003	2009
Santa Fe	Carlos Alberto Reutemann	Justicialist Party	2003	2009
Santiago del Estero	María Elisa Castro	Justicialist Party	2001	2007
Santiago del Estero	Mario Rubén Mera	Justicialist Party	2002 (Note: Since 2 March 2002. Replaced Carlos Juárez.)	2007
Santiago del Estero	José Luis Zavalía	Radical Civic Union	2001	2007
Tierra del Fuego	Mabel Luisa Caparrós	Justicialist Party	2001	2007
Tierra del Fuego	Liliana Capos	Radical Civic Union	2004 (Note: Since 24 February 2004. Replaced Jorge Colazo.)	2007
Tierra del Fuego	Mario Domingo Daniele	Justicialist Party	2001	2007
Tucumán	Ricardo Argentino Bussi	Republican Force	2003	2007 (Note: Resigned on 7 November 2007 to become a provincial deputy in Tucumán. Replaced by Carlos Salazar.)
Tucumán	Julio Antonio Miranda	Justicialist Party	2003	2009
Tucumán	Delia Norma Pinchetti de Sierra Morales	Republican Force	2003	2009
Tucumán	Carlos Eduardo Salazar	Republican Force	2007 (Note: Since 7 November 2007. Replaced Ricardo Bussi.)	2009
