= List of Argentine senators, 2007–2009 =

This is a list of members of the Argentine Senate from 10 December 2007 to 9 December 2009.

== Composition ==
as of 9 December 2009

Bloc	Seats	Leader
Front for Victory–PJ	31	Miguel Ángel Pichetto
Justicialist Party	12	
Radical Civic Union	10	Gerardo Morales
ARI	2	José Carlos Martínez
Civic Coalition	2	María Eugenia Estenssoro
Civic and Social Front of Catamarca	2	Oscar Castillo
Civic Front for Santiago	2	Ada Itúrrez de Cappellini
Front for the Renewal of Concord	2	Eduardo Torres
Republican Force	2	Carlos Salazar
Federalist Union	1	Jorge Colazo
New Front	1	Carlos Rossi
Neuquén People's Movement	1	Horacio Lores
Possible Santiago	1	Ana Corradi
Production and Labour	1	Roberto Basualdo
Socialist Party	1	Rubén Giustiniani
Union for Córdoba	1	Roberto Urquía
Source: senado.gov.ar (archive)

== Senate leadership ==
Title	Officeholder	Bloc	Province
President of the Senate (Note: Ex officio as Vice President of Argentina.)	Julio Cobos	Front for Victory–UCR	Mendoza
Provisional President	José Pampuro	Front for Victory–PJ	Buenos Aires Province
Vice President	Rubén Marín	Justicialist Party	La Pampa
First Vice President	Juan Carlos Marino	Radical Civic Union	La Pampa
Second Vice President	Liliana Negre de Alonso	Justicialist Party	San Luis

== Election cycles ==
Election	Term	
Election	Start	End
2003	10 December 2003	9 December 2009
2005	10 December 2005	9 December 2011
2007	10 December 2007	9 December 2013

== List of senators ==
Province	Senator	Party	Term	
Province	Senator	Party	From	To
Buenos Aires Province	Eric Calcagno y Maillmann	Front for Victory–PJ	2007 (Note: Since 10 December 2007. Replaced Cristina Fernández de Kirchner.)	2011
Buenos Aires Province	Hilda Beatriz González de Duhalde	Justicialist Party	2005	2011
Buenos Aires Province	José Juan Bautista Pampuro	Front for Victory–PJ	2005	2011
Buenos Aires	Samuel Manuel Cabanchik	Civic Coalition	2007	2013
Buenos Aires	María Eugenia Estenssoro	Civic Coalition	2007	2013
Buenos Aires	Daniel Fernando Filmus	Front for Victory–PJ	2007	2013
Catamarca	Oscar Aníbal Castillo	Civic and Social Front of Catamarca	2003	2009
Catamarca	María Teresita del Valle Colombo de Acevedo	Civic and Social Front of Catamarca	2003	2009
Catamarca	Ramón Eduardo Saadi	Justicialist Party	2003	2009
Chaco	Fabio Darío Biancalani	Front for Victory–PJ	2007	2013
Chaco	Elena Mercedes Corregido	Front for Victory–PJ	2007	2013
Chaco	Roy Abelardo Nikisch	Radical Civic Union	2007	2013
Chubut	Silvia Ester Giusti	Front for Victory–PJ	2003	2009
Chubut	Marcelo Alejandro Horacio Guinle	Front for Victory–PJ	2003	2009
Chubut	Norberto Massoni	Radical Civic Union	2003	2009
Córdoba	Haide Delia Giri	Justicialist Party	2003	2009
Córdoba	Carlos Alberto Rossi	New Front	2003	2009
Córdoba	Roberto Daniel Urquía	Union for Córdoba	2003	2009
Corrientes	Roberto Fabián Ríos	Justicialist Party	2003	2009
Corrientes	María Dora Sánchez	Radical Civic Union	2003	2009
Corrientes	Isabel Josefa Viudes	Front for Victory–PJ	2006 (Note: Since 15 March 2006. Replaced Raúl Romero Feris.)	2009
Entre Ríos	Pedro Guillermo Ángel Guastavino	Front for Victory–PJ	2007	2013
Entre Ríos	Blanca Inés Osuna	Front for Victory–PJ	2007	2011 (Note: Resigned on 10 December 2011 to take office as mayor of Paraná.)
Entre Ríos	Arturo Vera	Radical Civic Union	2007	2013
Formosa	Adriana Raquel Bortolozzi	Front for Victory–PJ	2005	2011
Formosa	José Miguel Ángel Mayans	Front for Victory–PJ	2005	2011
Formosa	Luis Carlos Petcoff Naidenoff	Radical Civic Union	2005	2011
Jujuy	Guillermo Raúl Jenefes	Front for Victory–PJ	2005	2011
Jujuy	Liliana Beatriz Fellner	Front for Victory–PJ	2005	2011
Jujuy	Gerardo Rubén Morales	Radical Civic Union	2005	2011
La Pampa	Silvia Ester Gallego	Justicialist Party	2003	2009
La Pampa	Rubén Hugo Marín	Justicialist Party	2003	2009
La Pampa	Juan Carlos Marino	Radical Civic Union	2003	2009
La Rioja	Ada Mercedes Maza	Front for Victory–PJ	2005	2011
La Rioja	Carlos Saúl Menem	Justicialist Party	2005	2011
La Rioja	Teresita Quintela	Front for Victory–PJ	2005	2011
Mendoza	María Cristina Perceval	Front for Victory–PJ	2003	2009
Mendoza	Ernesto Sanz	Radical Civic Union	2003	2009
Mendoza	Mónica Troadello	Front for Victory–PJ	2007 (Note: Since 10 December 2007. Replaced Celso Jaque.)	2009
Misiones	Eduardo Enrique Torres	Front for the Renewal of Concord	2007 (Note: Since 10 December 2007. Replaced Maurice Closs.)	2011
Misiones	Luis Alberto Viana	Front for Victory–PJ	2005	2011
Misiones	Élida María Vigo	Front for the Renewal of Concord	2005	2011
Neuquén	Marcelo Jorge Fuentes	Front for Victory–PJ	2007	2013
Neuquén	Horacio Lores	Neuquén People's Movement	2007	2013
Neuquén	Nanci María Agustina Parrilli	Front for Victory–PJ	2007	2013
Río Negro	María José Bongiorno	Front for Victory–PJ	2007	2013
Río Negro	Miguel Ángel Pichetto	Front for Victory–PJ	2007	2013
Río Negro	Pablo Federico Verani	Radical Civic Union	2007	2013 (Note: Died on 25 September 2013.)
Salta	Sonia Margarita Escudero	Front for Victory–PJ	2007	2013
Salta	Juan Agustín Pérez Alsina	Front for Victory–PJ	2007	2013
Salta	Juan Carlos Romero	Justicialist Party	2007	2013
San Juan	Roberto Gustavo Basualdo	Production and Labour	2005	2011
San Juan	César Ambrosio Gioja	Front for Victory–PJ	2005	2011
San Juan	Marina Raquel Riofrío	Front for Victory–PJ	2005	2011
San Luis	Liliana Negre de Alonso	Justicialist Party	2005	2011
San Luis	Daniel Raúl Pérsico	Front for Victory–PJ	2005	2011
San Luis	Adolfo Rodríguez Saá	Justicialist Party	2005	2011
Santa Cruz	Jorge Esteban Banicevich	Front for Victory–PJ	2009 (Note: Since 13 May 2009. Replaced Judith Forstmann.)	2011
Santa Cruz	Nicolás Alejandro Fernández	Front for Victory–PJ	2005	2011
Santa Cruz	Selva Judith Forstmann	Front for Victory–PJ	2006 (Note: Since 14 August 2006. Replaced Alicia Kirchner.)	2009 (Note: Died on 10 April 2009. Replaced by Jorge Banicevich.)
Santa Cruz	Alfredo Anselmo Martínez	Radical Civic Union	2005	2011
Santa Fe	Rubén Héctor Giustiniani	Socialist Party	2003	2009
Santa Fe	Roxana Itatí Latorre	Justicialist Party	2003	2009
Santa Fe	Carlos Alberto Reutemann	Justicialist Party	2003	2009
Santiago del Estero	Ana María Corradi de Beltrán	Possible Santiago	2007	2013
Santiago del Estero	Ada Rosa del Valle Itúrrez de Cappellini	Civic Front for Santiago	2007	2013
Santiago del Estero	Emilio Alberto Rached	Civic Front for Santiago	2007	2013
Tierra del Fuego	Mario Jorge Colazo	Federalist Union	2007	2013
Tierra del Fuego	María Rosa Díaz	ARI	2007	2013
Tierra del Fuego	José Carlos Martínez	ARI	2007	2011 (Note: Died on 27 July 2011. Replaced by Osvaldo Ramón López.)
Tucumán	Julio Antonio Miranda	Justicialist Party	2003	2009
Tucumán	Delia Norma Pinchetti de Sierra Morales	Republican Force	2003	2009
Tucumán	Carlos Eduardo Salazar	Republican Force	2007 (Note: Since 7 November 2007. Replaced Ricardo Bussi.)	2009
