= List of Argentine senators, 2003–2005 =

This is list of members of the Argentine Senate from 10 December 2003 to 9 December 2005.

== Composition ==
as of 9 December 2005

Bloc	Seats
Justicialist Party	38
Radical Civic Union	16
Civic and Social Front of Catamarca	2
Republican Force	2
Justicialist Loyalty and Dignity	2
Neuquén People's Movement	2
San Juan Renewal Crusade	1
Broad Front	1
Frepaso	1
Independent San Luis	1
Independent Radical	1
Jujuy Civic Front	1
New Party	1
Salta Renewal Party	1
Socialist Party	1
Vacant	1
Source: senado.gov.ar (archive)

== Senate leadership ==
Title	Officeholder	Bloc	Province
President of the Senate (Note: Ex officio as Vice President of Argentina.)	Daniel Scioli	Front for Victory–PJ	Buenos Aires Province
Provisional President	Marcelo Guinle	Justicialist Party	Chubut
Vice President	Marcelo López Arias	Justicialist Party	Salta
First Vice President	Mirian Curletti	Radical Civic Union	Chaco
Second Vice President	Ricardo Gómez Diez	Salta Renewal Party	Salta

== Election cycles ==
For the first time since 1973, all seats in the Argentine Senate were renewed in the 2001 legislative election, following the implementation of a new system as per the 1994 constitutional amendment. Under the agreed system, a third of all seats would be renewed for two years (2001–2003), a third for four years (2001–2005), and another third for six years (2001–2007). The term length was decided by draw. Accordingly, two thirds of the senators listed here were elected in 2001: one third for four-year terms (2001–2005) and another third for six-year terms (2001–2007). A third of the senators listed here were elected in 2003 for corresponding six year terms (2003–2009).

Election	Term	
Election	Start	End
2001	10 December 2001	9 December 2005
2001	10 December 2001	9 December 2007
2003	10 December 2003	9 December 2009

== List of senators ==
Province	Senator	Party	Term	
Province	Senator	Party	From	To
Buenos Aires Province	Antonio Francisco Cafiero	Justicialist Party	2002 (Note: Since 4 January 2002. Replaced Eduardo Duhalde.)	2005
Buenos Aires Province	Diana Beatriz Conti	Frepaso	2002 (Note: Since 3 July 2002. Replaced Raúl Alfonsín.)	2005
Buenos Aires Province	Mabel Hilda Müller	Justicialist Party	2001	2005
Buenos Aires	Vilma Lidia Ibarra	Broad Front	2001	2007
Buenos Aires	María Laura Leguizamón	Justicialist Party	2003 (Note: Since 10 December 2003. Replaced Gustavo Béliz, who never took office.)	2007
Buenos Aires	Rodolfo Terragno	Independent Radical	2001	2007
Catamarca	Oscar Aníbal Castillo	Civic and Social Front of Catamarca	2003	2009
Catamarca	María Teresita del Valle Colombo de Acevedo	Civic and Social Front of Catamarca	2003	2009
Catamarca	Ramón Eduardo Saadi	Justicialist Party	2003	2009
Chaco	Jorge Milton Capitanich	Justicialist Party	2001	2007
Chaco	Mirian Belén Curletti	Radical Civic Union	2001	2007
Chaco	Alicia Ester Mastandrea de Illia	Radical Civic Union	2003 (Note: Since 10 December 2003. Replaced Eduardo Moro.)	2007
Chubut	Silvia Ester Giusti	Justicialist Party	2003	2009
Chubut	Marcelo Alejandro Horacio Guinle	Justicialist Party	2003	2009
Chubut	Norberto Massoni	Radical Civic Union	2003	2009
Córdoba	Haide Delia Giri	Justicialist Party	2003	2009
Córdoba	Carlos Alberto Rossi	New Party	2003	2009
Córdoba	Roberto Daniel Urquía	Justicialist Party	2003	2009
Corrientes	Roberto Fabián Ríos	Justicialist Party	2003	2009
Corrientes	María Dora Sánchez	Radical Civic Union	2003	2009
Corrientes	Vacant	—N/a	2006 (Note: Vacant until 15 March 2006. Raúl Romero Feris, who had been elected in 2003, was not allowed to be sworn in by the Senate due to the corruption charges pressed against him.)	2009
Entre Ríos	Graciela Yolanda Bar	Justicialist Party	2001	2007
Entre Ríos	Laura Martínez Pass de Cresto	Justicialist Party	2003 (Note: Since 10 December 2003. Replaced Jorge Busti.)	2007
Entre Ríos	Ricardo César Taffarel	Radical Civic Union	2001	2007
Formosa	Marcela Fabiana Lescano	Radical Civic Union	2001	2005
Formosa	José Miguel Ángel Mayans	Justicialist Party	2001	2005
Formosa	Elva Azucena Paz	Justicialist Party	2001	2005
Jujuy	Lylia Mónica Arancio de Beller	Jujuy Civic Front	2001	2005
Jujuy	Guillermo Raúl Jenefes	Justicialist Party	2001	2005
Jujuy	Gerardo Rubén Morales	Radical Civic Union	2001	2005
La Pampa	Silvia Ester Gallego	Justicialist Party	2003	2009
La Pampa	Rubén Hugo Marín	Justicialist Party	2003	2009
La Pampa	Juan Carlos Marino	Radical Civic Union	2003	2009
La Rioja	Ada Mercedes Maza	Justicialist Party	2001	2005
La Rioja	Eduardo Menem	Justicialist Loyalty and Dignity	2001	2005
La Rioja	Jorge Raúl Yoma	Justicialist Party	2001	2005
Mendoza	María Cristina Perceval	Justicialist Party	2003	2009
Mendoza	Ernesto Sanz	Radical Civic Union	2003	2009
Mendoza	Celso Alejandro Jaque	Justicialist Party	2003	2007 (Note: Resigned on 10 December 2007 to become governor of Mendoza. Replaced by Mónica Troadello.)
Misiones	Mario Aníbal Losada	Radical Civic Union	2001	2005
Misiones	Mercedes Margarita Oviedo	Justicialist Party	2001	2005
Misiones	Federico Ramón Puerta	Justicialist Party	2001	2005
Neuquén	Sergio Adrián Gallia	Justicialist Party	2001	2007
Neuquén	Pedro Salvatori	Neuquén People's Movement	2001	2007
Neuquén	Luz María Sapag	Neuquén People's Movement	2001	2007
Río Negro	Jacobo Alberto Abrameto	Radical Civic Union	2007 (Note: Since 8 August 2007. Replaced Luis Falcó.)	2007
Río Negro	Luis Alberto Falcó	Río Negro Radical	2001	2007 (Note: Died on 28 July 2007. Replaced by Jacobo Abrameto.)
Río Negro	Amanda Mercedes Isidori	Radical Civic Union	2001	2007
Río Negro	Miguel Ángel Pichetto	Justicialist Party	2001	2007
Salta	Sonia Margarita Escudero	Justicialist Party	2001	2007
Salta	Ricardo Gómez Diez	Salta Renewal Party	2001	2007
Salta	Marcelo Eduardo López Arias	Justicialist Party	2001	2007
San Juan	Nancy Barbarita Avelín de Ginestar	San Juan Renewal Crusade	2001	2005
San Juan	Floriana Nélida Martin	Justicialist Party	2001	2005
San Juan	Luis Eduardo Martinazzo	Justicialist Party	2003 (Note: Since 10 December 2003. Replaced José Luis Gioja.)	2005
San Luis	Jorge Alfredo Agundez	Radical Civic Union	2001	2005
San Luis	Liliana Teresita Negre de Alonso	Justicialist Loyalty and Dignity	2001	2005
San Luis	Raúl Ernesto Ochoa	Independent San Luis	2001	2005
Santa Cruz	Nicolás Alejandro Fernández	Justicialist Party	2001	2005
Santa Cruz	Cristina Elisabet Fernández de Kirchner	Justicialist Party	2001	2005
Santa Cruz	Carlos Alfonso Prades	Radical Civic Union	2001	2005
Santa Fe	Rubén Héctor Giustiniani	Socialist Party	2003	2009
Santa Fe	Roxana Itatí Latorre	Justicialist Party	2003	2009
Santa Fe	Carlos Alberto Reutemann	Justicialist Party	2003	2009
Santiago del Estero	María Elisa Castro	Justicialist Party	2001	2007
Santiago del Estero	Mario Rubén Mera	Justicialist Party	2002 (Note: Since 2 March 2002. Replaced Carlos Juárez.)	2007
Santiago del Estero	José Luis Zavalía	Radical Civic Union	2001	2007
Tierra del Fuego	Mabel Luisa Caparrós	Justicialist Party	2001	2007
Tierra del Fuego	Liliana Capos	Radical Civic Union	2004 (Note: Since 24 February 2004. Replaced Jorge Colazo.)	2007
Tierra del Fuego	Mario Jorge Colazo	Radical Civic Union	2001	2004 (Note: Resigned on 10 January 2004 to become Governor of Tierra del Fuego. Replaced by Liliana Capos.)
Tierra del Fuego	Mario Domingo Daniele	Justicialist Party	2001	2007
Tucumán	Ricardo Argentino Bussi	Republican Force	2003	2007 (Note: Resigned on 7 November 2007 to become a provincial deputy in Tucumán. Replaced by Carlos Salazar.)
Tucumán	Julio Antonio Miranda	Justicialist Party	2003	2009
Tucumán	Delia Norma Pinchetti de Sierra Morales	Republican Force	2003	2009
