= List of former Argentine senators =

This is an incomplete list of all people who previously served in the Argentine Senate.

Contents: A B C D E F G H I J K L M N O P Q R S T U V W Y Z

== A ==
Senator	Years	Province	Party
Elías Abad	1942–1943	Corrientes	
Demetrio César Abdala	1963–1966	La Rioja	
Felipe Abdala	1963–1966	Mendoza	UCRP
Jacobo Abrameto	2007–2007	Río Negro	Radical Civic Union
Aurelio Acuña	1942–1943	Catamarca	National Democrat
Ernesto Niceo Acuña	1963–1966	Catamarca	UCRP
Ramón Edgardo Acuña	1963–1966	Catamarca	UCRP
Américo Aguiar Vázquez	1963–1966	San Juan	UCRP
Carlos Aguinaga	1966–1966	Mendoza	Democratic Party of Mendoza
Jorge Agundez	1995–2005	San Luis	Radical Civic Union
Augusto Alasino	1992–2001	Entre Ríos	Justicialist Party
Ramón Albariño	1952–1955	Entre Ríos	
Alejandro Albarracín	1992–2001	Entre Ríos	Justicialist Party
Martín Albarracín	1913–1922	San Juan	Conservative
Leandro Alem	1891 – 1892; 1893	Buenos Aires City	Radical Civic Union
Raúl Alfonsín	2001–2002	Buenos Aires	Radical Civic Union
José Antonio Allende	1973–1976	Córdoba	Frejuli
Ramón Almendra	1983–1986	Santa Cruz	Justicialist Party
Carlos Almirón	1995–1999	Tucumán	Republican Force Tucumán
José Alperovich	2001–2003	Tucumán	Justicialist Party
Valentín Alsina	1862–1868	Buenos Aires	Buenos Aires Autonomist
Juan Carlos Altuna	1998–2001	Chubut	Radical Civic Union
Ramón Alvarado	1855–1861	Jujuy	
Sergio Alvarado	1904–1910	Jujuy	
Antenor Álvarez	1909–1910	Santiago del Estero	
Eduardo Angeloz	1973 – 1976; 1995 – 2001	Córdoba	Radical Civic Union
Rodolfo Angulo	1952–1955	Catamarca	
Armando Antille	1924 – 1930; 1946 – 1952	Santa Fe	
Atilio Antinucci	1953–1955	Córdoba	
Castulo Aparicio	1895–1904	Jujuy	
Tomás Arana	1958–1962	Buenos Aires	Radical Civic Union
Alberto Arancibia Rodríguez	1932–1943	San Luis	National Democrat
Lylia Arancio de Beller	2001–2005	Jujuy	Radical Civic Union
Daniel Araoz	1868–1874	Jujuy	
Ramón Araujo	1983–1985	Tucumán	Justicialist Party
Mario Arenas	1932–1941	Mendoza	National Democrat
Aureliano Argento	1876–1883	Santa Fe	
Fenando Arias	1857–1861	Salta	
José Manuel Arias	1860 – 1861; 1869 – 1880	Salta	
Tomás Arias	1857–1861	Salta	
Eduardo Arnold	1998–2001	Santa Cruz	Justicialist Party
Alfredo Arrieta	1946–1950	Buenos Aires	
Herminio Arrieta	1838–1943	Jujuy	National Democrat
Félix Astudillo	1963–1966	Santa Fe	Intransigent Radical Civic Union
Pedro Avalos	1973–1976	Misiones	Frejuli
Alfredo Avelín	1992–1999	San Juan	Renewal Crusade of San Juan
Nancy Avelín de Ginestar	2001–2005	San Juan	Renewal Crusade of San Juan
Lidoro Avellaneda	1898–1907	La Rioja	
Marco Avellaneda	1910–1911	Buenos Aires City	
Nicolás Avellaneda	1874; 1883 – 1885	Tucumán	
Arcadio Avendaño	1946–1952	Santiago del Estero	
Alberto Aybar Augier	1921–1928	Tucumán	
Moisés Azar	1961–1962	Formosa	

== B ==
Senator	Years	Province	Party
Raúl Baglini	2001 – 2003?	Mendoza	Radical Civic Union
Santiago Baibiene	1880–1889	Corrientes	
José Baltore	1880–1889	Entre Ríos	
Graciela Bar	2001–2007	Entre Ríos	Justicialist Party
Juan Barbeito	1892–1901	San Luis	
Adolfo Barbich	1963–1966	Santa Cruz	UCRP
Yamili Bárbora de Nasif	1973–1976	Santa Fe	Frejuli
Alberto Barceló	1942–1943	Buenos Aires	Conservative
José Barcena	1854 – 1859; 1863 – 1868; 1875 – 1886	Jujuy	
Gerónimo del Barco	1864–1868	Santa Fe	
Danilo Baroni	1973–1976	Chaco	Frejuli
Federico de la Barra	1856 – 1857; 1860 – 1861	San Juan	
Pedro Barraza	1895–1901	Santiago del Estero	
José Luis Barrionuevo	2001 – 2003?	Catamarca	Justicialist Party
Nicolás Barros	1881 – 1889; 1895 – 1896	La Rioja	
Mario Bartolucci	1997–1998	San Luis	Justicialist Party
Juan Carlos Basaldúa	1946–1952	Entre Ríos	
Ricardo Bassi	1963–1966	Buenos Aires City	UCRP
José Bauducco	1963–1966	La Pampa	UDELPA
Daniel Baum	1995–2001	Neuquén	Justicialist Party
Eduardo Bauza	1996–2001	Mendoza	Justicialist Party
Ernesto Bavio	1946–1952	Salta	
Servando Bayo	1881–1884	Santa Fe	
Augusto Bayol	1958–1962	Santa Fe	
Abel Bazán	1864–1880	La Rioja	
Eduardo Bazán	1958–1962	Catamarca	
Miguel Ángel Bazán	1952–1955	La Rioja	
Raúl Beascochea	1961–1962	La Pampa	
Emilio Belenguer	1973–1976	Río Negro	Frejuli
Tiburcio Benegas	1886 – 1887; 1895 – 1904	Mendoza	
Juan Carlos Beni	1973–1976	Santa Cruz	Frejuli
Apolinario Benítez	1871–1875	Entre Ríos	
Antonio Berhongaray	1983 – 1989; 1995 – 1999	La Pampa	Radical Civic Union
Norma Bermejo	2003	Córdoba	Labour
Miguel Ángel Bernardo	1963–1966	San Luis	Intransigent Radical Civic Union
Alfredo Bertín	1958–1962	San Luis	
José María Bértora	1958–1962	Entre Ríos	Intransigent Radical Civic Union
Pablo Biain	1958–1962	Chaco	
Eufemio Blanco	1973–1976	La Rioja	Frejuli
Eusebio Blanco	1864–1874	Mendoza	
Ramón Blanco	1955; Never assumed	Santiago del Estero	
Rubén Blanco	1963–1966	Buenos Aires	UCRP
José Octavio Bordón	1992–1996	Mendoza	Justicialist Party
Alberto Borella	1962	Santa Fe	
Juan Francisco Borges	1860 – 1861; 1862 – 1874	Santiago del Estero	
Francisco de Borja Correa	1863–1868	Mendoza	
Ricardo Branda	1992–2001	Formosa	Justicialist Party
Federico Bravo	1966	San Juan	Blockist Party
Leopoldo Bravo	1973 – 1976; 1986 – 2001	San Juan	Blockist Party
Mario Bravo	1923 – 1930; 1932 – 1938	Buenos Aires City	Socialist Party
Blas Brisoli	1952–1955	Mendoza	
Guillermo Brizuela	1973–1976	Catamarca	Federalist Popular Alliance
Hugo Genaro Brizela	1973–1976	Jujuy	Frejuli
Eduardo Brizuela del Moral	2001–2003	Catamarca	Radical Civic Union
Vicente Brizuela Nieto	1955	La Rioja	Peronist
Carlos Bruchmann	1932–1938	Santiago del Estero	Socialist
Duilio Brunello	1955	Catamarca	
Juan Bullo	1922	Santa Fe	
Alfredo Busquet	1946–1949	Buenos Aires	
Ricardo Bussi	2003–2007	Tucumán	Republican Force Tucumán
Jorge Busti	2001–2003	Entre Ríos	Justicialist Party
Francisco Bustos	1889–1895	La Rioja	

== C ==
Senator	Years	Province	Party
Ricardo Caballero	1919 – 1928; 1937 – 1943	Santa Fe	Radical Civic Union
Fernando Cabana	1992–2001	Jujuy	Justicialist Party
Rubén Cáceres	1973–1976	Formosa	Radical Civic Union
Antonio Cafiero	1993 – 2001; 2002 – 2005	Buenos Aires	Justicialist Party
Segundo Calderón	1958–1962	La Rioja	
María Rosa Calviño de Gómez	1952–1955	Buenos Aires City	Peronist
Nicolás Calvo	1859–1861	Corrientes	
Antonino Cambaceres	1882–1888	Buenos Aires City	
Cleto del Campillo	1858–1861	Córdoba	
Donaciano del Campillo	1901–1910	Córdoba	
José María del Campo	1864–1866	Tucumán	
Pedro Cámpora	1973–1976	Mendoza	Frejuli
Rudecindo Campos	1927 – 1930; 1932 – 1938	Jujuy	Jujuy Popular Party
Miguel Cané	1898–1904	Buenos Aires City	
Emilio Cantarero	1995–2001	Salta	Justicialist Party
Aldo Cantoni	1923 – 1926; 1932 – 1941	San Juan	Antipersonal Radical Civic Union
Aldo Hermes Cantoni	1963–1966	San Juan	Blockist Party
Apolo Cantoni	1973–1976	San Juan	Frejuli
Francisco E. Cañeque	1958–1961	Mendoza	UCRI
Mabel Caparrós	2001–2007	Tierra del Fuego	Justicialist Party
Jorge Capitanich	2001–2007	Chaco	Justicialist Party
Liliana Capos	2001–2007	Tierra del Fuego	Justicialist Party
Francisco Capraro	1963–1966	Neuquén	Neuquén People's Movement
Enrique Carbo	1895 – 1903; 1907 – 1914	Entre Ríos	
José Carbonell	1999– 2001	Tucumán	Justicialist Party
Luis Carnevale	1973–1976	Córdoba	Frejuli
José Armando Caro	1955; 1973 – 1976	Salta	Peronist; Frejuli
José Hilario Carol	1854–1857	Santiago del Estero	
Leonidas Carreño	1907–1911	La Rioja	
José María del Carril	1871–1874	San Juan	
Salvador María del Carril	1862	Entre Ríos	
Manuel Carrillo	1910–1913	Jujuy	
Pablo Carrillo	1877–1886	Jujuy	
Macario Carrizo	1986–1987	Córdoba	Radical Civic Union
María del Carmen Casco de Aguer	1953–1955	Chaco	Peronist
Francisco Castañeda Vega	1913–1922	Santiago del Estero	Conservative
Hilda Nélida Castañeira	1952–1955	Santa Fe	
José Castiglione	1963–1966	Santiago del Estero	UCRP
Ramón Castillo	1932–1935	Catamarca	National Democrat
Vicente del Castillo	1854–1855	Santa Fe	
Juan B. Castro	1938–1943	Santiago del Estero	Radical Civic Union
Jorge A. Castro	1983–1986	Santiago del Estero	Justicialist Party
María Elisa Castro	2001–2007	Santiago del Estero	Justicialist Party
Mariano Ceballos	1932–1935	Córdoba	National Democrat
Raúl Ceballos Reyes	1932–1941	La Rioja	Radical Civic Union
Felipe Celli	1983–1986	Córdoba	Radical Civic Union
Gerónimo Cello	1884–1886	Santa Fe	
Juan Cepeda	1937–1943	Santa Fe	Progressive Democrat
Francisco Cerro	1973–1976	Santiago del Estero	Frejuli
Jorge Céspedes	1922–1928	Mendoza	
Juan Carlos Chaile	1973–1976	Chubut	Frejuli
Lázaro Chiappe	2001–2003	Corrientes	Liberal Party of Corrientes
Pedro Ciarlotti	1958–1962	Chubut	
Emilio Civit	1891 – 1892; 1910 – 1919	Mendoza	Conservative
Francisco Civit	1877–1886	Mendoza	
Maurice Closs	2005–2007	Misiones	Front for the Renewal of Concord
Felix de la Colina	1941–1943	La Rioja	
María Colombo de Acevedo	2001–2009	Catamarca	Radical Civic Union
Ezequiel Colombres	1873–1877	Tucumán	
Eduardo Contato Carol	2001	Santiago del Estero	Justicialist Party
Diana Conti	2002–2005	Buenos Aires	FrePaSo
Carlos Corach	1999–2001	Buenos Aires City	Justicialist Party
Hebe Corchuelo Blasco	1988–1989	Chubut	Justicialist Party
Lucas Córdoba	1898–1901	Tucumán	
Juan Carlos Cornejo Linares	1973–1976	Salta	Frejuli
Luis Corradi	1963–1966	Santa Cruz	Christian Democratic Party
Antonio Correa	1952–1955	Tucumán	
Francisco Correa	1932–1935	Santa Fe	Progressive Democrat
Susana Correche	1953–1955	La Pampa	Peronist
Rolando Corte	1961–1962	Jujuy	
Gerónimo Cortés	1875 – 1880; 1890 – 1891	Córdoba	
Rafael Cortés	1880 – 1881; 1883 – 1887	San Luis	
Santiago Corvalán	1928–1930	Santiago del Estero	
Federico Corvalán	1868–1877	Mendoza	
Rufino Cossio	1941–1943	Tucumán	Radical Civic Union
Antonio Crespo	1855–1860	Santiago del Estero	
Antonio F. Crespo	1889–1893	Entre Ríos	
José Camilo Crotto	1912–1918	Buenos Aires	Radical Civic Union
Luis Cruz	1946–1952	Tucumán	
Luis Culasso Mattei	1973–1976	Santa Fe	Popular Federal Alliance
José María Cullen	1862–1865	Santa Fe	
Mirian Curletti	2001–2007	Chaco	Radical Civic Union

== D ==
Senator	Years	Province	Party
Lucio d'Agostino	1973–1976	Entre Ríos	Frejuli
Carlos d'Amico	1883–1884	Buenos Aires	
Mario Daniele	2001–2007	Tierra del Fuego	Justicialist Party
Justo Daract	1862–1865	San Luis	
Mauricio Daract	1862–1874	San Luis	
Adolfo Dávila	1912–1918	La Rioja	Conservative
Aníbal Dávila	1958–1962	Corrientes	
Domingo Dávila	1881–1889	La Rioja	
Guillermo Dávila	1863–1871	La Rioja	
Carlos de la Rosa	1995–2001	Mendoza	Justicialist Party
Fernando de la Rúa	1973–1976	Buenos Aires City	Radical Civic Union
José Manuel de la Sota	1995–1999	Córdoba	Justicialist Party
Lisandro de la Torre	1932–1937	Santa Fe	Progressive Democrat Party
Enrique de Llamas	1958–1962	Chaco	
Zelmira De Luca de Soto	1955	Corrientes	
José Guillermo de Paolis	1952–1955	Mendoza	
Roberto de Rege	1963–1966	Río Negro	Christian Democratic Party
José Evaristo de Uriburu	1901–1910	Buenos Aires City	PAN
Pedro del Piero		Buenos Aires City	Frepaso
Antonio del Pino	1889 – 1898; 1907 – 1916	Catamarca	
Aristóbulo del Valle	1877–1890	Buenos Aires	
Délfor del Valle	1922–1930	Buenos Aires	Radical Civic Union
Enrique del Valle Iberlucea	1913–1921	Buenos Aires City	Socialist Party
Manuel del Villar	1986–1988	Chubut	Radical Civic Union
Antonio del Viso	1880	Córdoba	
Francisco Delgado	1855 – 1857; 1862 – 1865	Mendoza	
Manuel Derqui	1886–1891	Corrientes	
Elena di Girolamo	1952–1955	Corrientes	
Arturo di Pietro	1999–2000	Santa Fe	Justicialist Party
Antonino Díaz	1898–1907	Salta	
Juan Luis Díaz	1958–1961	Formosa	
Alejandro Díaz Bialet	1973–1976	Buenos Aires City	Frejuli
Perdo Díaz Colodrero	1941–1942	Corrientes	Autonomist
Wenceslao Díaz Colodrero	1868–1876	Corrientes	
Luis María Díaz Colodrero		Corrientes	Liberal Party of Corrientes
Ciriaco Díaz Vélez	1855–1861	La Rioja	
Carlos Doncel	1889 – 1896; 1898 – 1907	San Juan	
Eduardo Duhalde	2001–2002	Buenos Aires	Justicialist Party
Alberto Durand	1946–1955	Salta	

== E ==
Senator	Years	Province	Party
Leonidas Echagüe	1875 – 1880; 1891 – 1899; 1904 – 1907	Entre Ríos	
Pascual Echagüe	1854–1861	Catamarca	
Pedro Echagüe	1910–1919	Santa Fe	Conservative
Atanasio Eguiguren	1932–1943	Entre Ríos	Antipersonal UCR
Ángel Elías	1855 – 1861; 1863 – 1871	La Rioja; Entre Ríos	
Florencio Elías	1973–1976	Salta	Salta Popular Movement
Rufino de Elizalde	1862	Buenos Aires	
Victor Endeiza	1949–1952	San Luis	
Gerónimo Espejo	1854–1857	Mendoza	
Joaquín Esperanza	1973–1976	Formosa	Justicialist Party
Manuel Estévez	1913–1922	Tucumán	Conservative
Luis Etchevehere	1925–1930	Entre Ríos	
Carlos Evans	1973–1976	Mendoza	Justicialist Party

== F ==
Senator	Years	Province	Party
Mario Fadel	1993–1995	Catamarca	Justicialist Party
Clodomiro Falco	1958–1962	Santiago del Estero	
Luis Falco	2001–2007	Río Negro	Radical Civic Union
José Falsone	1983–1989	Misiones	Radical Civic Union
Santiago Fassi	1963–1966	Buenos Aires City	UCRP
Ramón Febre	1880–1889	Entre Ríos	
Gabriel Feris	1983–1987	Corrientes	Autonomist
Mariano Fernández	1963–1966	La Pampa	Popular Union
Horacio Fernández Beschtedt	1958–1959	Neuquén	
Cristina Fernández de Kirchner	1995 – 1997, 2001 – 2007, 2017 – 2019	Santa Cruz 95–97, 01–05; Buenos Aires 05-07, 17-19	Justicialist Party; Front for Victory
Graciela Fernández Meijide	1995–1997	Buenos Aires City	FrePaSo
Juan Antonio Ferrari	1953–1955	La Pampa	
Pedro Ferré	1854 – 1861; 1862 – 1867	Catamarca; Corrientes	
Demetrio Figueiras	1946–1949	Santa Fe	
Alberto Figueroa	1936–1943	Catamarca	National Democrat
Benjamín Figueroa	1889–1898	Salta	
Francisco Figueroa	1892–1901	Catamarca	
Héctor Figueroa	1958–1962	Córdoba	
José Manuel Figueroa	1854–1860	San Luis	
Marcos Figueroa	1880–1883	Catamarca	
José Figueroa Alcorta	1898–1904	Córdoba	
Juan Pablo Fittipaldi	1958–1961	Neuquén	
Víctor Hugo Fleitas	1958–1961	Corrientes	
Domingo Flores	1963–1966	San Luis	Popular Action
Alberto María Fonrouge	1973–1976	Buenos Aires	Frejuli
Judit Forstmann	2007–2009	Santa Cruz	Front for Victory
Mariano Fragueiro	1858; 1863 – 1865	Córdoba	
Carlos Franco	1973–1976	San Luis	Justicialist Party
Ángel Freytes	1963–1966	Santiago del Estero	UCRP
Félix Frías	1863–1868	Buenos Aires	
Luis Frías	1874–1883	Santiago del Estero	
Uladislao Frías	1865 – 1869; 1875 – 1878	Tucumán	
Domingo Frois	1973–1976	La Pampa	Justicialist Party
Amadeo Frugoli	1973–1976	Mendoza	Popular Renewal Alliance
Héctor de la Fuente	1926–1930	La Rioja	
Maximino de la Fuente	1889–1898	La Rioja	
Augusto Funes	1925–1930	Córdoba	
Pedro Funes	1886–1890	Córdoba	
Rafael Funes	1904–1913	Santa Fe	
Carlos Delcio Funes	2001	Santa Fe	Justicialist Party

== G ==
Senator	Years	Province	Party
José Enrique Gadano	1963–1966	Río Negro	UCRP
Edgardo José Gagliardi	1996–2001	Río Negro	Radical Civic Union
José Miguel Galán	1854	Entre Ríos	
Francisco Galíndez	1932–1941	Catamarca	National Democrat
Silvia Gallego	2003–2009	La Pampa	Justicialist Party
Sergio Gallia	2001–2007	Neuquén	Justicialist Party
Pedro Gallo			
Segundo Gallo	1922–1928	Catamarca	
Vicente Gallo	1919–1923	Buenos Aires City	Radical Civic Union
Victorio Gallo	1958–1962	Catamarca	
Raúl Galván	1995–2001	La Rioja	Radical Civic Union
José Gálvez	1890–1904	Santa Fe	
Eduardo Gamond	1963–1966	Córdoba	UCRP
Alfredo García	1958–1962	Tucumán	
José Luis Gioja	1995–2003	San Juan	Justicialist Party
Haide Giri	2003–2009	Córdoba	PJ -FPV
Silvia Giusti	2003–2009	Chubut	PJ – FPV
Ricardo Gomez Diez	2001–2007	Salta	Salta Renewal Party
José María Guido	1958–1962		

== I ==
Senator	Years	Province	Party
Vilma Ibarra	2001–2007	Buenos Aires City	FrePaSo
Bernardo de Irigoyen	1894 – 1898; 1902 – 1906	Buenos Aires City; Buenos Aires	Radical Civic Union
Amanda Isidori	2001–2007	Río Negro	Radical Civic Union

== J ==
Senator	Years	Province	Party
Celso Jaque	2003–2007	Mendoza	Justicialist Party
Miguel Juárez Celman	1883–1886	Córdoba	
Juan B. Justo	1924–1928	Buenos Aires City	Socialist Party

== K ==
Senator	Years	Province	Party
Alicia Kirchner	2005–2006	Santa Cruz	Front for Victory

== L ==
Senator	Years	Province	Party
Juanita Larrauri	1952 – 1955; 1973 – 1976	Entre Ríos	Justicialist Party
María Laura Leguizamón	2003–2007	Buenos Aires City	Front for Victory
Marcelo Lopez Arias	2001–2007	Salta	Justicialist Party

== M ==
Senator	Years	Province	Party
Juan Carlos Maqueda	2001–2002	Córdoba	Justicialist Party
Rubén Marín	1989 – 1991; 2003 – 2009	La Pampa	Justicialist Party; Front for Victory
Laura Martinez Pass de Cresto	2001–2007	Entre Ríos	Justicialist Party
Norberto Massoni	2003–2009	Chubut	Radical Civic Union
Alicia Mastandrea	2001–2007	Chaco	Radical Civic Union
Eduardo Menem	1983–2005	La Rioja	Justicialist Party
Mario Mera	2001–2007	Santiago del Estero	Justicialist Party
Julio Miranda	1992 – 1999; 2003 – 2009	Tucumán	Justicialist Party; Front for Victory

== O ==
Senator	Years	Province	Party
Pacho O'Donnell	1998–1998	Buenos Aires City	Justicialist Party
Nicasio Oroño	1868–1877	Santa Fe	

== P ==
Senator	Years	Province	Party
Alfredo Palacios	1932 – 1943; 1961 – 1962	Buenos Aires City	Socialist
Robustiano Patrón Costas	1916 – 1925; 1932 – 1943	Salta	National Democrat
Marcos Paz	1854 – 1858; 1860 – 1861; 1862 – 1862	Tucumán	
Juan Esteban Pedernera	1855–1859	San Luis	
María Perceval	2003–2009	Mendoza	PJ -FPV
Carlos Humberto Perette	1973–1976	Entre Ríos	Radical Civic Union
Tomás L. Perón	1870–1872	Buenos Aires	
Delia Pinchetti de Sierra Morales	2003–2009	Tucumán	Republican Force
Ramón Puerta	2001–2005	Misiones	Justicialist Party

== R ==
Senator	Years	Province	Party
Fabián Ríos	2003 -2009	Corrientes	PJ – FPV
Julio Argentino Roca	1888 – 1890; 1892 – 1893; 1895 – 1898	Buenos Aires City 1889–90; Tucumán 1892-93/1895-98	PAN
Alberto Rodríguez Saá	1983 – 1994; 2000 – 2003	San Luis	Justicialist Party
Carlos Rossi	2003–2009	Córdoba	Alliance New Front

== S ==
Senator	Years	Province	Party
Ramon Saadi	1987 – 1988; 2003 – 2009	Catamarca	Justicialist Party
Vicente Saadi	1946 – 1949; 1973 – 1976; 1983 – 1987	Catamarca	Peronist; Frejuli; Justicialist Party
Luis Sáenz Peña	1892–1892	Buenos Aires	
Carlos Salazar	2007–2009	Tucumán	Republican Force
Pedro Salvatori	2001–2007	Neuquén	Neuquino People's Movement
Dora Sánchez	2003–2009	Corrientes	Radical Civic Union
Elías Sapag	1963 – 1966; 1973 – 1976; 1983 – 1993	Neuquén	Neuquino People's Movement
Luz Sapag	2001–2007	Neuquén	Neuquino People's Movement
Carlos Serrey	1906 – 1907; 1925 – 1930; 1932 – 1943	Salta	Conservative

== T ==
Senator	Years	Province	Party
Ricardo Taffarel	2001–2007	Entre Ríos	Radical Civic Union
Rodolfo Terragno	1995 – 1997; 2001 – 2007	Buenos Aires City	Radical Civic Union
Mónica Troadello	2007–2009	Mendoza	PJ – FPV

== U ==
Senator	Years	Province	Party
Roberto Urquía	2003–2009	Córdoba	PJ – FPV
Horacio Usandizaga	1995–2003	Santa Fe	Radical Civic Union

== V ==
Senator	Years	Province	Party
Carlos Verna	1993 – 2003; 2009 –	La Pampa	Justicialist Party
Isabel Viudes	Dec. 2001; 2006 – 2009	Corrientes	PJ, New Corrientes Party, FPV

== W ==
Senator	Years	Province	Party
Pablo Walter	2001–2003	Tucumán	Republican Force Tucumán
Rodolfo Weidmann	1958–1961	Santa Fe	
Kenneth Woodley	1983–1986	Chubut	Radical Civic Union

== X ==
Senator	Years	Province	Party
Carlos Xamena	1952–1955	Salta	

== Y ==
Senator	Years	Province	Party
Felipe Yofre	1893 – 1898; 1905 – 1907	Córdoba	
Eduardo Yoma	1995–2005	La Rioja	Justicialist Party

== Z ==
Senator	Years	Province	Party
José Luis Zavalía	2001–2007	Santiago del Estero	Radical Civic Union

== See also ==
- List of current Argentine senators
