= José Alperovich =

Argentine politician

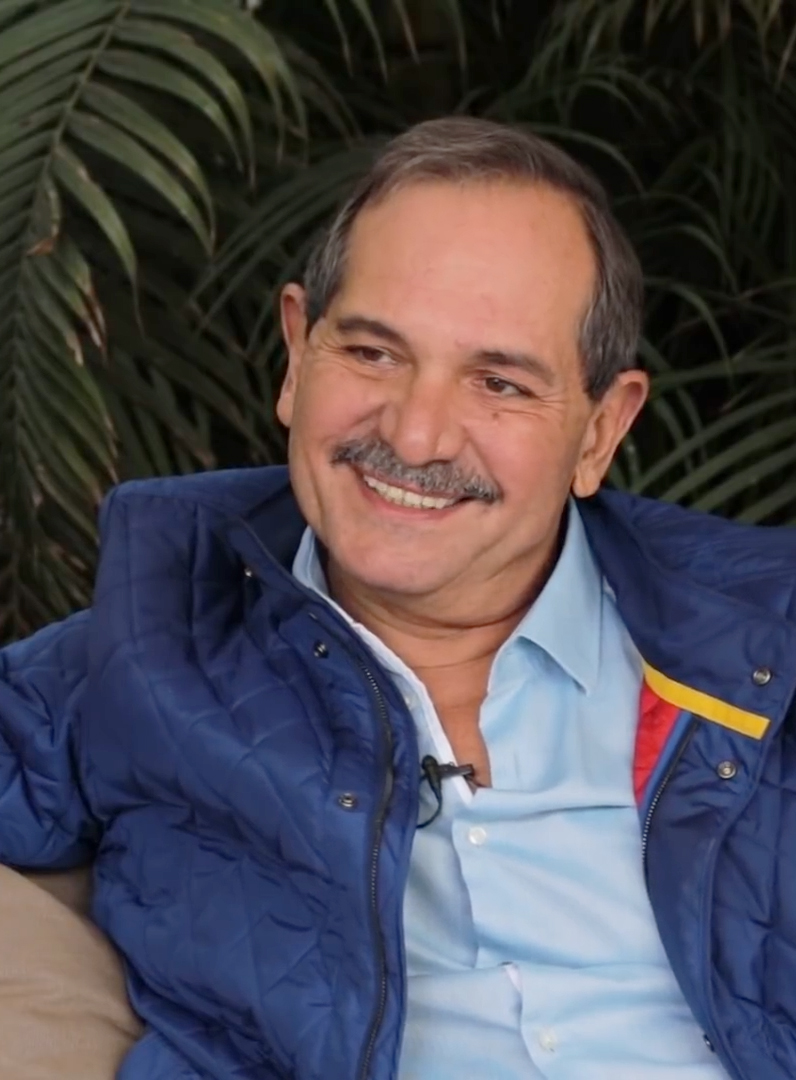

National Senator
- In office 10 December 2015 – 10 December 2021
- Constituency: Tucumán
- In office 10 December 2001 – 28 October 2008
- Constituency: Tucumán

Governor of Tucumán
- In office 29 October 2003 – 29 October 2015
- Lieutenant: Fernando Juri (2003-07); Juan Luis Manzur (2007-09); Sergio Mansilla (2009-11); Regino Amado (2011-15); Juan Luis Manzur (2015)
- Preceded by: Julio Miranda
- Succeeded by: Juan Luis Manzur

Personal details
- Born: April 14, 1955 (age 71) Banda del Río Salí, Tucumán, Argentina
- Party: Justicialist Party
- Other political affiliations: Front for Victory (2003–2017); Frente de Todos (since 2019)
- Spouse: Beatriz Rojkés de Alperovich (until 2025)
- Education: National University of Tucumán
- Profession: Accountant

José Jorge Alperovich (born 13 April 1955) is an Argentine politician who served as governor of Tucumán Province from 2003 to 2015. He was elected in 2003, and reelected in 2007 and 2011. Alperovich was also a National Senator for Tucumán from 2001 to 2008, and then from 2015 to 2021.

On 18 June 2024, Alperovich was found guilty of rape and sexual assault, and sentenced to 16 years in prison.

== Biography ==
=== Early life and education ===
Alperovich was born in Banda del Río Salí to Marta León, an Argentine Jew, and León Alperovich, a Lithuanian Jew from Lithuania whose parents had settled in one of the numerous Jewish agricultural colonies in Argentina. His father relocated to Tucumán Province and later established León Alperovich S.A., one of the most important auto dealerships in Tucumán.

He enrolled at the University of Tucumán, and graduated as an accountant.

=== Career ===
He worked as an accountant for several years, then began his political career in the provincial legislature in 1995. He served as chairman of the provincial Committee of Finance and Budget under Governor Antonio Bussi.

Alperovich was a member of the centrist Radical Civic Union until 1999, when Bussi failed to achieve re-election and the new Justicialist Party governor, Julio Miranda, appointed Alperovich to be Minister of Economy. Alperovich thereupon switched to the Justicialist Party. His appointment to the ministerial position was part of an agreement that was designed to maintain a channel of communications between the Justicialist Party and the Alliance government of Fernando de la Rúa. Alperovich was elected to the Senate amid the political crisis of 2001, and ran for governor of Tucumán Province in 2003.

Some commentators had speculated that Alperovich would not be able to become governor if elected because of the provincial law that required him to give an oath on the Christian Bible. A constitutional crisis ensued; ultimately, Alperovich's challenge to the provincial law met with success in the Supreme Court, which amended Tucumán's Constitution to allow Alperovich to take the oath on the Hebrew Torah.

Alperovich owns several houses and apartments, concessionaires, and many acres of soybeans and cattle. He has auto dealerships, sells truck and agricultural machinery, and is also active in hotel and commercial development and in construction and real estate. He owns several apartment buildings in San Miguel de Tucumán and over 120,000 hectares of land in Tucumán, Salta, and Santiago del Estero provinces.

=== Governor of Tucumán Province ===
During his early years as governor, Alperovich formed strong political ties with President Néstor Kirchner, who provided funds for various projects in the province that included a comprehensive public works program. Consequently, Alperovich's tenure as governor was marked by significant developments in health, education, and social services and record public works funding for extensive public housing, highways, and other projects.

He was re-elected governor in 2007 with more than 78 % of the vote. In that year a law was passed limiting the number of gubernatorial terms to two, starting in 2007. In that year, he was reelected by a 73% margin over Ricardo Bussi, who ran on the right-wing Republican Force ticket, He secured a constitutional amendment that would allow him to run for a third term, and in 2008 unsuccessfully proposed another amendment that would remove all gubernatorial term limits.

Alperovich was able to run for a third term because his 2003–07 term did not count under the 2007 term-limits law, which limited governors of Tucumán to two terms, starting in 2007. He was the first governor in the modern history of Tucumán to be elected for a third time.

Alperovich announced on January 15, 2014, that he would not seek a fourth term as governor, but “did not dismiss the possibility that his wife, Senator Beatriz Rojkés, would run to succeed him in 2015.”

=== Personal life ===
Alperovich was previously married to Beatriz Rojkés de Alperovich, who also served as National Senator and president of the Justicialist Party in Tucumán Province, and with whom he has four children. In November 2025 it was reported that Alperovich and Rojkés de Alperovich had divorced the month prior, and that Alperovich was to marry Marianela Mirra, a former Gran Hermano winner.

== Sexual assault conviction ==
In November 2019, two criminal complaints were filed against Alperovich for multiple incidents of sexual assault by his 29-year-old niece. The same month, a former aide to Alperovich also filed a complaint for sexual assault against him. Alperovich denied the accusations.

He was found guilty of multiple counts of rape and sexual assault on 18 June 2024, and sentenced to 16 years in prison. After serving one year of his sentence in prison, Alperovich was granted house arrest on 25 June 2025.

== Honours and awards ==
=== Foreign honours ===
- Spain: Knight Grand Cross of the Order of Isabella the Catholic (6 February 2009)

Preceded by Julio Miranda	Governor of Tucumán; 2003–2015	Succeeded by Juan Luis Manzur
