= Senator Salazar =

Senator Salazar may refer to:

== Argentina ==
- Carlos Salazar (Argentine politician), senator for Tucumán in 2007–2009

== Mexico ==
- Francisco Javier Salazar Sáenz (born 1940), senator for San Luis Potosí in 1994–2000 and 2020–2021
- Luis Fernando Salazar Fernández (born 1977), senator for Coahuila in 2012–2018 and since 2024
- Pablo Salazar Mendiguchía (born 1954), senator for Chiapas in 1994–2000
- Rabindranath Salazar Solorio (born 1968), senator for Morelos in 2012–2018
- Radamés Salazar Solorio (1974–2021), senator for Morelos in 2018–2021

== Peru ==
- Manuel Salazar y Baquíjano (1777–1850), senator for Lima in 1845–1850

== Philippines ==
- Pastor Salazar (1891–1952), senator for the 9th senatorial district in 1926–1928

== United States ==
- Julia Salazar (born 1990), New York State Senate
- Ken Salazar (born 1955), senator for Colorado in 2005–2009
- Tim Salazar, Wyoming State Senate
