= Eduardo Torres =

Eduardo Torres may refer to:

- Eduardo Torres (politician), Argentine politician
- Eduardo Torres (organist) (1872–1934), Spanish organist and composer
