= Juanita Larrauri =

Argentine singer and politician

Juana Larrauri
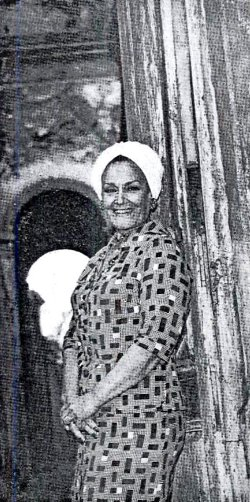

National Senator
- In office 25 April 1952 – 16 September 1955
- Constituency: Entre Ríos
- In office 25 May 1973 – 24 March 1976
- Constituency: Entre Ríos

Personal details
- Born: 12 March 1910 Buenos Aires, Argentina
- Died: 21 February 1990 (aged 79) Buenos Aires, Argentina
- Party: Justicialist Party
- Spouse: Francisco Rotundo
- Occupation: Singer, politician

Juana Larrauri de Abramí, also known as Juanita Larrauri (12 March 1910 – 21 February 1990) was a tango singer and was among a group of the first women elected to the Argentine Senate. (Note: In addition to Larrauri, the other women elected to serve in the Senate from 1952 were: Maria Rosa Calvino de Gómez, Elvira Rodriguez Leonardi de Rosales, Elena di Girolamo, Ilda Leonor Pineda de Molins and Hilda Nelida Castañeira de Vaccaro.) She was elected twice as a senator and in both cases lost her seat as a result of right-wing military coups; she was elected in 1951 and lost her seat in 1955, then was elected again in 1973 and lost her seat again in 1976.

== Personal life ==
She was born in the Floresta neighborhood of Buenos Aires on 12 March 1910. In 1949 she married pianist and orchestral director Francisco Rotundo. She died in Buenos Aires on 21 February 1990 at the age of 79.

== Singing career ==
In 1931 Larrauri began her career as a tango singer on LR3 Radio Nacional (later called Radio Belgrano). In 1936 she made her first record for Odeón. Other radio stations on which she appeared included LS3 Radio Mayo, LS5 Radio Rivadavia, LS2 Radio Prieto and LR2 Radio Argentina.

With Peronism's rise to power in the 40s she postponed her singing career, but she was still featured in 1952 as the singer in "Evita Capitana" – a feminine hymn to Peronsim – by Rodolfo Sciamarella, and in 1972 she recorded an album titled Canto para mi pueblo. She wrote the tango "La piba de mano a mano" (one of the tracks on this album) together with Tití Rossi.

Apart from her recordings and a few short tours in Argentina and neighboring countries, the bulk of her singing career was on radio.

== Political life ==
Larrauri joined a group of women that, led by Eva Perón, pushed the passing of the law giving women the right to vote, approved in 1947.

Larrauri joined the National Committee of Eva Perón's Women's Peronist Party (Partido Peronista Femenino, or PPF) as the representative of Entre Ríos Province. Other members were Águeda Barro, Dora Gaeta, María Rosa Calviño, Amparo Pérez, and Delia Parodi.

In 1951 Larrauri was elected by the provincial legislature of Entre Ríos Province as one of its National Senators, joining a group of the first women to be elected to the Senate. That same year Larrauri sang "Evita Capitana", which became the anthem of the Women's Peronist Party. In 1952 she became the president of the Commission for the Eva Perón Monument.

She was deposed along with all the other elected representatives by a right-wing military coup (the Revolución Libertadora) on 16 September 1955, and was imprisoned by the resulting military dictatorship of Pedro Eugenio Aramburu.

During the ban of Peronism (1955–1972) Larrauri became a major leader in the women's branch of the movement known as the "Peronist Resistance". When the ban on the Justicialist Party (Partido Justicialista) was lifted in 1972, she was a member of its Consejo Superior, representing the women's branch of the Peronist movement, which, at its core, took a position in opposition to Jorge Daniel Paladino. In 1972 she was part of the delegation which accompanied Juan Perón on his return to Argentina.

In 1973 she was re-elected as a national senator, and on 24 March 1976 was again deposed along with the other elected representatives when a right-wing military dictatorship under Jorge Rafael Videla overthrew Isabel Perón in a coup d'état.

== Discography ==
- Canto para mi pueblo, 1972.

== See also ==
- List of former Argentine Senators
- List of tango singers
