= Vicente Saadi =

Argentine politician

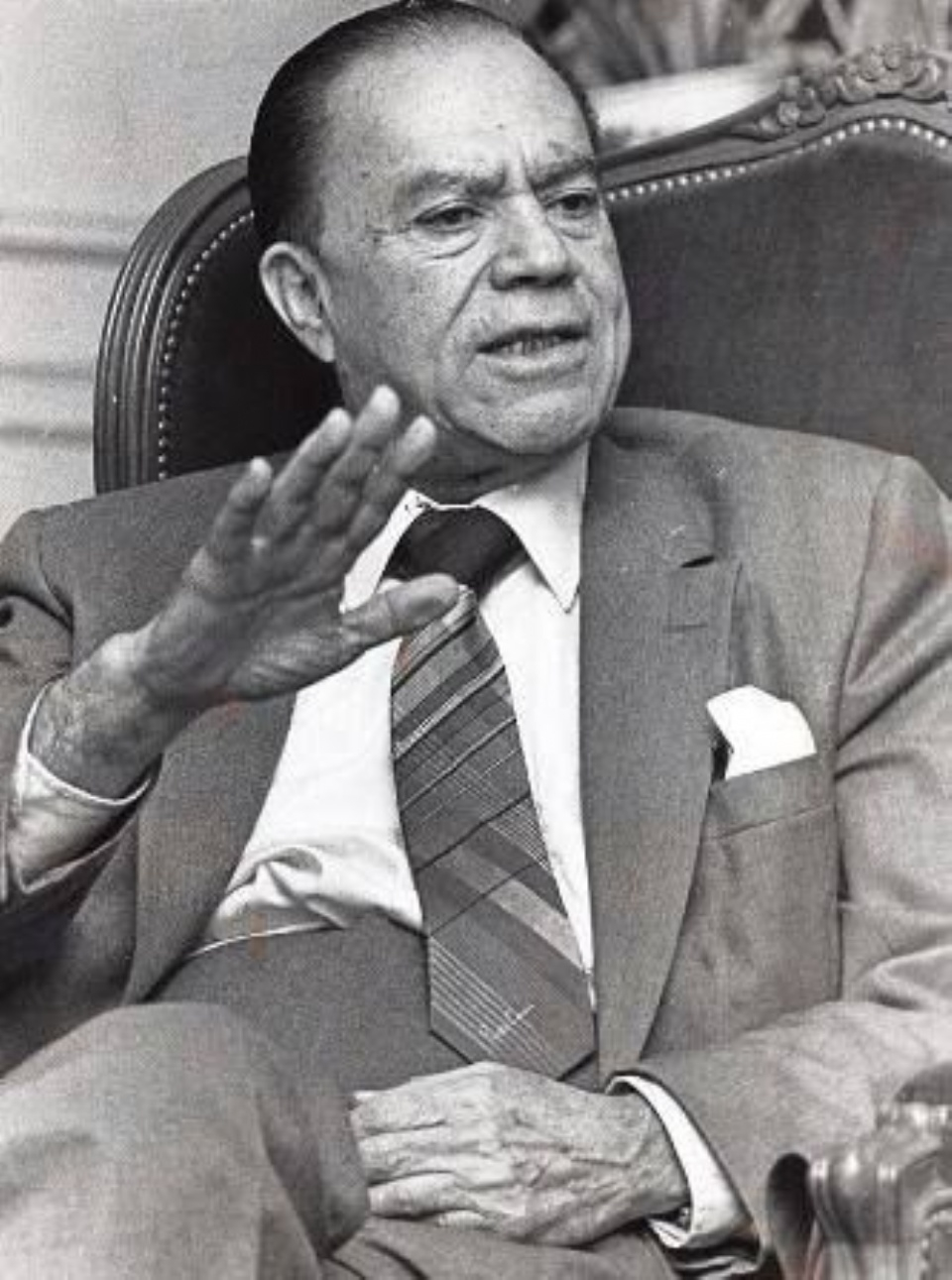

Governor of Catamarca
- In office June 4, 1949 – June 3, 1952; December 10, 1987 – July 10, 1988

National Senator
- In office 1946 – 1949; 1973 – 1976; 1983 – 1987
- Constituency: Catamarca

Personal details
- Born: July 19, 1913 Belén, Catamarca
- Died: July 10, 1988 (aged 74)
- Party: Justicialist Party
- Spouse: Alicia Cubas de Saadi

Vicente Leonidas Saadi (19 July 1913 – 10 July 1988) was an Argentine Justicialist Party politician. He was a senator and governor for Catamarca Province, and became the patriarch of a family that has dominated Catamarca politics since the 1940s.

Born in Belén, his family were prosperous Syrian immigrants who became prominent in local commerce. He allied himself with the centrist Radical Civic Union (UCR) early on, though after the rise of populist leader Juan Perón in 1945, he switched allegiances for the latter.

Saadi was elected Senator in 1946, serving until 1949 when he was elected on the Peronist ticket as Governor of Catamarca. The party's leader, President Perón, ordered Saadi removed from his post after four months, however, amid allegations of "nepotism and despotism" in his administration of the remote province. Saadi was subsequently expelled from the party, and served time in prison.

He was married to Alicia Cubas de Saadi, and a number of their children went on to become leading Catamarca Province figures, as well. Ramón Saadi was elected governor of Catamarca in 1987, Alicia Saadi was elected to the Senate in 1999, and Vicente Saadi (jr) and his daughter-in-law.

He was ultimately re-elected to the Senate in 1973 on behalf of the Peronist-led Frejuli alliance, serving until the dissolution of the Argentine Senate in the March 1976 coup. In the 1970s Saadi had been a leading supporter of the far-left Montoneros, and set up the Intransigencia y Movilización faction; he was a patron of future Defense Minister Nilda Garré.

Re-elected in 1983 at the return of democracy, Saadi led the Justicialists in the Senate, where the party obtained a majority of 21 seats to 18 for the UCR. Saadi abandoned his earlier support for left-wing Peronists, and endorsed Herminio Iglesias as candidate in the race for Governor of Buenos Aires (the nation's largest province). Iglesias, a right-wing Peronist, lost the race, and despite the miscalculation, Saadi was elected vice-president of the party. In that capacity, he worked closely with the leader of the UCR, President-elect Raul Alfonsín, during the transition to democracy.

Saadi later took part in a famous television debate with Dante Caputo on November 14, 1984, arguing against the Treaty of Peace and Friendship of 1984 between Chile and Argentina. In 1987 he swapped jobs with his son, Ramón, becoming governor once again whilst his son became a Senator. He remained powerful in the party, and that year, decided that the Justicialist Party would not pay the $8 million ransom demanded for the return of the hands of Juan Perón, which had been stolen in June or July of that year. Vicente died in office.

Saadi was a leading figure in the politics of his province and the left wing of his party, serving as vice-president of the Peronists and considered a caudillo for his manner of control. He was one of the first prominent Syrian-Argentines and his name is recorded in streets, squares and other institutions around the country.
