= Carlos Serrey =

Argentine politician

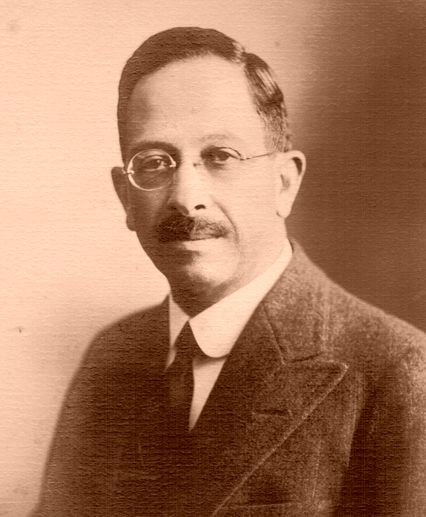
Carlos Serrey

Carlos Serrey Dávila (26 August 1873 – ?) was an Argentine attorney and Conservative politician.

Serrey served as a district attorney, mayor of Salta, and member of the Argentine Chamber of Deputies and Argentine Senate for his home province of Salta. He was elected to preside both bodies.

Serrey first served as Senator between 1906 and 1907, finishing the term of the deceased Francisco Uriburu. He returned to the Senate in 1925, serving until it was dissolved by the coup of 1943.

Serrey proposed the 1936 Law 11627, known as the "Serrey Law", which expropriated the historic Cabildo of Salta which was recovered and re-opened as the Historical Museum of the North, and declared a National Historical Monument in 1946.
