= Jorge Banicevich =

Argentine Justicialist Party politician

National Senator
- In office 13 May 2009 – 10 December 2011
- Preceded by: Judith Forstmann
- Constituency: Santa Cruz

Personal details
- Party: Justicialist Party

Jorge Esteban Banicevich is an Argentine Justicialist Party politician. He sat in the Argentine Senate representing Santa Cruz Province in the majority block of the Front for Victory.

Banicevich served as Mayor of 28 de Noviembre in Santa Cruz and as a provincial state legislator between 2003 and 2007. He was a member of the board of FOMICRUZ, the Santa Cruz state mining company.

On 10 April 2009, the sitting senator for Santa Cruz Judith Forstmann was killed in a road accident. Banicevich had been first reserve in the elections of 2005, whilst Forstmann had been second reserve, but had taken the seat to ensure female representation of the province in the Senate upon the resignation of Alicia Kirchner. Banicevich's nomination as senator was somewhat controversial, both as he had previously been passed over in the order for replacements and because it would leave Santa Cruz as the only province with all-male representation. However, the Radicals joined with the Front for Victory to approve his nomination. He took his seat on 13 May 2009 and completed his term on 9 December 2011.
