= César Gioja =

Argentine politician (born 1945)

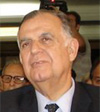
- Portrait of César Ambrosio Gioja Senador

National Senator
- In office 10 December 2005 – 9 December 2011
- Constituency: San Juan

Personal details
- Born: February 10, 1945 (age 81)
- Party: Justicialist Party
- Spouse: Myriam A. Dorgan
- Profession: Lawyer

César Ambrosio Gioja (born 10 February 1945, San Juan) is an Argentine Justicialist Party politician. He sits in the Argentine Senate representing San Juan Province in the majority block of the Front for Victory.

Gioja qualified as a teacher from secondary school and as a lawyer from the University of Morón in Buenos Aires Province. He was active in student politics, leading the Catholic university youth movement and serving as president of the law faculty student union 1965–7. He was also a leading activist in the Peronist Youth.

In 1973, Gioja was elected as a provincial deputy. Following the military coup of 1976, he was detained without trial until the following year. He continued to be politically active and, at the return of democracy, stood as Justicialist Liberation Front candidate for Governor of San Juan in 1983. Although he was unsuccessful, his brother José Luis Gioja was elected governor in 2003. Another brother, Juan Carlos Gioja, has been a national deputy. From 1984 he was an advisor to the mayoralty of Iglesia Department in San Juan and in 1991 he became subsecretary of Interior Security under the national Interior Ministry.

In 1992 Gioja was minister of government of the San Juan Province and from 2003 he became an adviser to his brother's governorship. In 2005 he was elected as a Senator. He is President of the Mining, Energy and Fuel Committee.
