= Élida Vigo =

Argentine politician (born 1944)

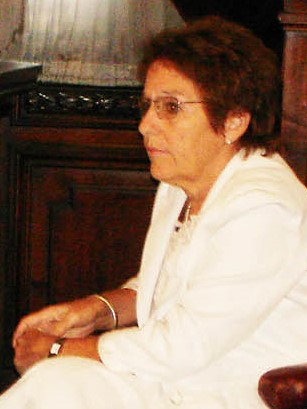

National Senator
- In office 10 December 2005 – 9 December 2011
- Succeeded by: Salvador Cabral Arrechea
- Constituency: Misiones

Personal details
- Born: October 6, 1944 (age 81) San Juan Province
- Party: Front for the Renewal of Concordia
- Spouse: Salvador Cabral Arrechea
- Profession: Housewife, teacher

Élida María Vigo (born 6 October 1944, in San Juan Province) is an Argentine politician. From 2005 to 2011 she sat in the Argentine Senate representing Misiones Province in the majority block of the Front for Victory.

Vigo followed the left wing politics of Jorge Abelardo Ramos who described his ideology as the 'National Left'. She founded a party, the Movement for a New Country, which is part of the electoral alliance, the Front for the Renewal of Concordia. This Front was formed by Radicals and Peronists to support then governor Carlos Rovira and which supports the government of President Cristina Fernández de Kirchner and her predecessor Néstor Kirchner and their Front for Victory.

Vigo moved to Misiones in 1975. She served as a councillor in Posadas from 1987 until 1991, then served as a provincial deputy until 1995. From 1995 she was undersecretary of women and families in Misiones until 1996. From 1999 until 2002 she was deputy representative of Misiones Province in Buenos Aires, then returned to Misiones to become undersecretary of government.

In 2005 Vigo was elected to the Senate, with mandate until 2011. She was also a member of the Mercosur Parliament. Vigo is also secretary general of the Union of Housewives and of its Misiones branch.

Her sister, Alejandra Vigo, is also active in politics and currently serves as a National Senator for Córdoba since 2021.
