= Luis Viana =

Argentine politician (born 1962)

National Senator
- In office 10 December 2005 – 10 December 2011
- Constituency: Misiones

Personal details
- Born: 8 January 1962 (age 64) Salto Encantado, Misiones
- Party: Justicialist Party

Luis Alberto "Lucho" Viana (born 8 January 1962 in Salto Encantado, Misiones) is an Argentine Justicialist Party politician. He was a member of the Argentine Senate representing Misiones Province in the majority block of the Front for Victory from 2005 to 2011.

Viana was born in Misiones to Juan Viana and Russian-born Miguelina Jozwiaczyk. He studied chemical engineering in Posadas at the National University of Misiones where he was a student activist and Peronist Youth activist. He began work for the provincial sanitary works administration and set up his own chemical engineering consultancy to provide technical support to co-operatives in south Misiones and northern Corrientes. He taught at his former university.

When in 1991 Ramón Puerta was elected Governor of Misiones, Viana joined his administration as subsecretary of coordination of the provincial Ministry of Public Works but soon resigned to become intervenor of the sanitary works administration. In 1995, Viana was elected as a provincial deputy. Following his re-election in 1999 he became president of the block of Justicialist deputies and later president of the chamber. He was elected to the Argentine Chamber of Deputies and in 2005 was elected as senator. In 2007 he stood to be the Front for Victory candidate for the governorship of Misiones.
