= Teresa Quintela =

Argentine politician (born 1950)

Teresita Quintela
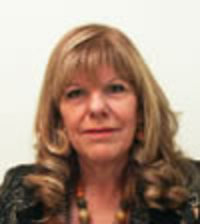

National Senator
- In office 10 December 2005 – 9 December 2011
- Constituency: La Rioja

Personal details
- Born: Teresa Nicolasa Quintela; January 26, 1950 (age 76) La Rioja, Argentina
- Party: Justicialist Party
- Profession: Social worker

Teresa Nicolasa Quintela (born 26 January 1950, in La Rioja) is an Argentine Justicialist Party politician. She sat in the Argentine Senate representing La Rioja Province in the majority block of the Front for Victory from 2005 to 2011.

Quintela qualified as a social worker in 1975 from the National University of Córdoba and gained a social services license from the same university in 1983. She further studied management and social policy at the University of Mendoza in 1987. She held various social work and administrative roles in La Rioja after the return of democracy.

In 1995 Quintela was elected as a La Rioja city councillor, but soon joined the provincial government as Secretary of State for social development until 1998. In 2001 she was elected to the provincial legislature and in 2005 was elected a Senator. She was President of the Municipal Affairs Committee during her tenure in the Senate. In 2008, her vote against a bill on withholdings for agricultural exports became pivotal and was seen as a defeat for the governing coalition.

Quintela's brother, Ricardo Quintela, served as Mayor of the City of La Rioja and Governor of La Rioja Province.

In November 2009 Argentinian Legislators passed a law which would change the minimum age to be brought to trial from 18 to 14. She was the only one who voted against this law.
