= Adriana Bortolozzi =

Argentine politician

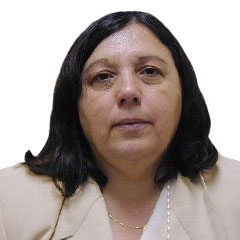

National Senator
- In office 10 December 2005 – 10 December 2011
- Constituency: Formosa

National Deputy
- In office 10 December 2001 – 10 December 2005
- Constituency: Formosa
- In office 10 December 1995 – 10 December 1997
- Constituency: Formosa

Personal details
- Born: March 1, 1949 (age 77) Gessler, Santa Fe
- Party: Justicialist Party
- Spouse: Floro Bogado
- Profession: Lawyer

Adriana Raquel Bortolozzi de Bogado (born 1 March 1949, Gessler, Santa Fe) is an Argentine Justicialist Party politician. She served both as a member of the Argentine Senate and in the Argentine Chamber of Deputies, representing Formosa Province in the majority block of the Front for Victory.

Bortolozzi qualified as a lawyer in 1981 at the Universidad Nacional del Nordeste (UNNE). From 1985 to 1987 she was minister of social action for Formosa Province and assisted the governor's office on issues concerning native peoples. From 1989 to 1996 she served as a provincial deputy and was then elected to the Argentine Chamber of Deputies in 1996, serving for a year until she resigned. From 1997 until 2001 she was once again a provincial deputy, and then returned to the Argentine Congress as a national deputy from 2001 to 2005. She was elected a senator in 2005.

Her husband Floro Bogado has been vice governor of Formosa since 1995 having himself been governor from 1983 to 1987, and their son Adrián Floro Bogado is a provincial deputy.
