= María Elisa Castro =

Argentine architect and politician

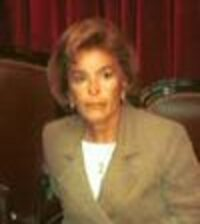
María Elisa Castro (2005)

María Elisa Castro (born November 27, 1954) is an Argentine architect and politician from the Justicialist Party (PJ), who served as national senator for the Santiago del Estero Province between 2001 and 2007. By lot, she was awarded a six-year term that ended in 2007.

== Biography ==
María Elisa Castro was born in Añatuya, Santiago del Estero Province, in 1954. She received her degree as an architecture from the National University of Tucumán in 1982.

Since 1987, she has held various positions in the government of the Santiago del Estero Province. In 1987, she was appointed Social Technical Secretary of the Provincial Institute of Housing and Urbanism (IPVU), and in 1989, undersecretary of Promotion and Assistance to the Community of the provincial Ministry of Social Welfare and undersecretary of Women. In 1993, she was appointed technical secretary of the IPVU, and in 1996, general director of Architecture. In 1998, she became president of the IPVU, and the following year, Governor Carlos Arturo Juárez appointed her Minister of Public Works and Services of Santiago del Estero Province.

In the partisan sphere, she was secretary of the board of the provincial PJ and national congressperson since 1986. In 1999, she was a candidate for vice-mayor of the city of Santiago del Estero.

In the 2001 Argentine legislative election, she was elected national senator by Santiago del Estero on the Frente Justicialista list, along with Carlos Juárez.

Between 2001 and 2002, Castro served as president of the Housing Commission. She has also served as secretary of the Infrastructure, Housing and Transportation Commission and of the Bermejo River Works Support Commission. She was a member of the Intersectoral Articulation commission; Internal Security and Drug Trafficking; of Regional Economies, Micro, Small and Medium Enterprises; Population and Human Development; and Environment and Sustainable Development. She was a representative before the Latin American Parliament.
