= Luis Falcó =

Argentine politician (1949–2007)

Luis Alberto Falcó
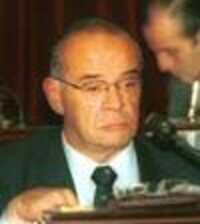

National Senator
- In office 10 December 2001 – 28 July 2007
- Preceded by: Edgardo José Gagliardi
- Succeeded by: Jacobo Alberto Abrameto
- Constituency: Río Negro

Personal details
- Born: 26 September 1949 General Roca, Río Negro Province, Argentina
- Died: 28 July 2007 (aged 57) Viedma, Argentina
- Party: UCR
- Profession: physician

Luis Alberto Falcó (26 September 1949, General Roca-28 July 2007, Viedma) was an Argentine physician and politician of the Radical Civic Union (UCR). He served on the Argentine Senate from 2001 until his death.

Falcó was born in General Roca, Río Negro Province and attended school there. He graduated in medicine at the Catholic University of Córdoba in 1972. His specialism was traumatology and orthopaedics. He completed his residency in that specialism at the Hospital Fernández in Buenos Aires, and practised in his home city for many years.

Upon the return of democracy in 1983, Falcó was appointed Government Secretary for the General Roca municipality. In 1985 he became a General Roca councillor. From 1991 he served for ten years on the Río Negro provincial legislature, becoming first vice president of the body. He became leader of the Río Negro UCR in 2000.

Falcó was elected to the Senate at the head of the UCR list in 2001. He was a prolific legislator, introducing dozens of new laws. In 2004 he introduced more new projects than any other national legislator. His best known contribution is the so-called 'Falcó Law', Ley 26.093, which promoted the use of biofuels.

Falcó died in July 2007 after a long illness. Jacobo Abrameto was appointed to complete the remaining months of his term on the Senate.
