= Alicia Mastandrea =

Argentine politician

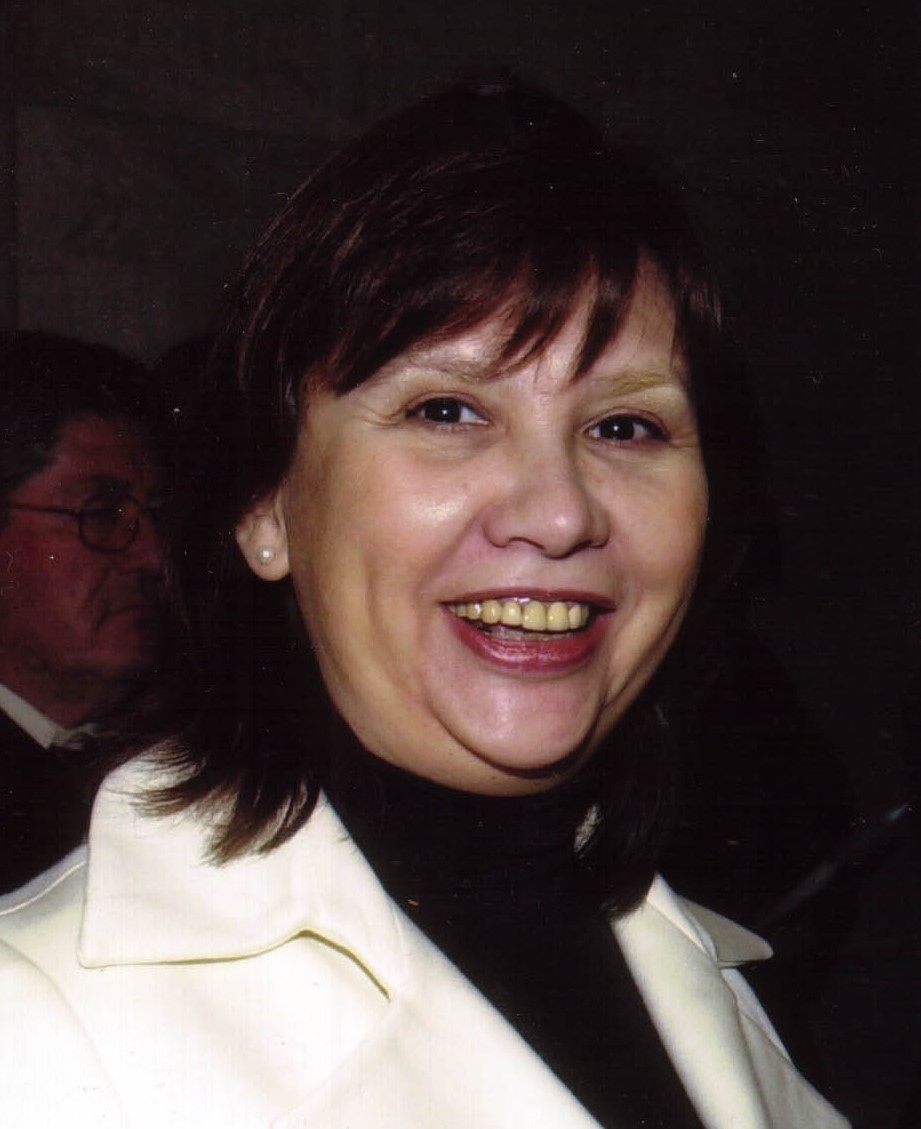
Alicia Ester Mastandrea

Alicia Ester Mastandrea is an Argentine Radical Civic Union (UCR) politician, formerly representing Chaco Province in the Argentine Senate, now a provincial deputy in that Province.

Mastandrea attended the National University of La Plata, where she was active in the students' union. She graduated in 1974 as an architect. She became director of planning for the municipality of Resistencia, Chaco in 1980 and also began to teach in her field at the Universidad Nacional del Nordeste in Resistencia. In 1992 she became a junior minister in the government of Resistencia, and in 1996 she moved to the government of Chaco Province.

Over the same period, Mastandrea became involved in the UCR, holding leading positions in the province. She was elected a senator in 2001 and represented the province on the UCR national committee 2003–5. She chaired the Senate committee on Industry and Trade.

Mastandrea left the Senate in 2007 and was elected a provincial deputy for the Front for Everyone in Chaco. She was sworn in as President of the Provincial Chamber of Deputies.
