= Ada Maza =

Argentine politician

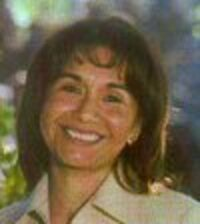

National Senator
- In office December 10, 2001 – December 9, 2011
- Constituency: La Rioja

Personal details
- Born: September 17, 1958 (age 67) La Rioja
- Party: Justicialist Party

Ada Mercedes Maza (born September 17, 1958, in La Rioja) is an Argentine Justicialist Party politician. She sat in the Argentine Senate representing La Rioja Province in the majority block of the Front for Victory.

Maza studied in La Rioja then civil engineering in Córdoba Province. Back in La Rioja, she studied mining engineering. She is a technician of legislative administration. From 1973 she was a student activist and from 1976, following the military coup, she was detained without trial until 1978. Following the return of democracy in 1983 she took an executive position in the provincial Justicialist Party and was elected a councillor in La Rioja, presiding the treasury and budget committee. She was vice president of the provincial Peronist Youth.

On October 14, 2001, Maza was elected as a Senator. She was re-elected in 2005, taking the place of her brother Ángel Maza, who did not take his seat but continued as governor of La Rioja. Previously close to former President and fellow La Rioja Senator Carlos Menem, she is now in the ranks of followers of Kirchnerism.
