= Julio Miranda =

Argentine politician (1946–2021)

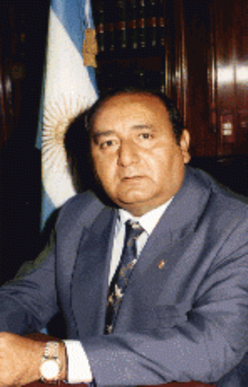

National Senator
- In office 10 December 2003 – 10 December 2009
- Succeeded by: Beatriz Rojkés de Alperovich
- Constituency: Tucumán
- In office 22 December 1992 – 27 October 1999
- Succeeded by: José Carbonell
- Constituency: Tucumán

Governor of Tucumán
- In office 29 October 1999 – 29 October 2003
- Preceded by: Antonio Domingo Bussi
- Succeeded by: José Alperovich

Personal details
- Born: 17 October 1946 Manuel García Fernández, Tucumán Province, Argentina
- Died: 6 June 2021 (aged 74) Tucumán, Argentina
- Party: Justicialist Party

Julio Antonio Miranda (17 October 1946 – 6 June 2021) was an Argentine politician and a member of the Justicialist Party. He was a Senator for Tucumán Province and was part of the majority Front for Victory parliamentary group. Previously he had been governor of Tucumán and national Senator before being elected to this office

Born in the village of Manuel García Fernández, in Leales Department, Tucumán, Miranda completed the 4th grade (half) of elementary school. Miranda's political career began as trade union man, representing the State Oil Workers Trade Union (SUPE). He was elected a Senator in 1992 by the Tucuman province legislature. In 1999, Miranda was elected Governor of Tucumán by a narrow margin (6,800 votes) defeating the son of the incumbent governor Antonio Domingo Bussi. His four years saw considerable controversy and fierce opposition from the Republican Force Tucumán party led by Antonio Bussi and his son, Ricardo. At the end of his term in 2003, Miranda stood again for the Senate. His party's candidate, José Alperovich, beat the younger Bussi for the governorship.

From 1997 to 1999, Miranda was President of the soccer club Club Atlético Tucumán.

He died on 6 June 2021 at the age of 74.
