= Nicolás Fernández (politician) =

Argentine politician

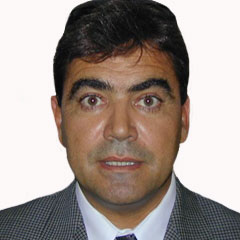
- Argentine Justicialist Party politician

National Senator
- In office 10 December 2001 – 10 December 2011
- Constituency: Santa Cruz

Personal details
- Born: 16 December 1958 (age 67) Puerto Deseado, Santa Cruz Province, Argentina
- Party: Justicialist Party

Nicolás Alejandro Fernández (born 16 December 1958) is an Argentine Justicialist Party politician. He was a member of the Argentine Senate representing Santa Cruz Province in the majority block of the Front for Victory.

Born in Puerto Deseado, Santa Cruz Fernández graduated as a lawyer in 1985 from the Catholic University of Santa Fe. From 1986 to 1989 he was an adviser to the Council of Caleta Olivia and from 1987 he was also adviser to the Caleta Olivia mayoralty. From 1991 he was adviser to Las Heras municipality and he also advised various oil companies and trade unions. From 1986 he has also run a legal practice in Caleta Olivia.

Fernández was elected to the Senate in 2001 and was re-elected in 2005.

In 2016, Fernandez was stopped by Argentina customs for trying board a plane with U$S28,000 to Miami, FL
