= Sonia Escudero =

Argentine Justicialist Party politician

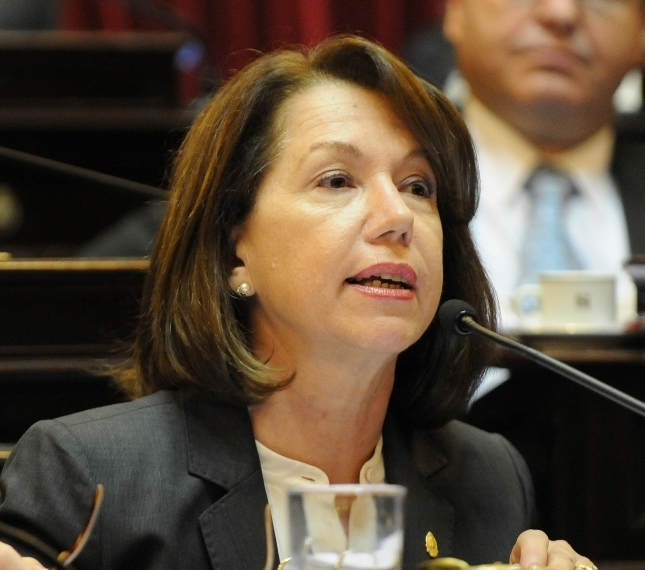

National Senator
- In office 10 December 2001 – 10 December 2013
- Preceded by: Salta

Personal details
- Born: 14 December 1953 (age 72) Salta, Argentina
- Party: Justicialist Party
- Spouse: Kenneth Warren Reed
- Profession: Lawyer
- Website: Official website

Sonia Margarita Escudero (born 14 December 1953, Salta) is an Argentine Justicialist Party politician. She sat in the Argentine Senate representing Salta Province from 2001 to 2013. She was part of the majority block of the Front for Victory from 2003 to 2009. She is Secretary General of the Latin American Parliament.

Escudero qualified as a lawyer at the Catholic University of Salta and practiced law privately from 1977 to 1996. She was a legal adviser in various capacities to the Salta legislatures and government and was a public prosecutor for Salta 1988–90. She also taught at the Catholic University of Salta.

Escudero was elected to the Argentine Senate in 2001 and was re-elected in 2007. She is Secretary General of the Latin American Parliament, serving as part of the Argentine delegation to that body.

Escudero sat in the governing Front for Victory block in the Senate until 20 February 2009 when her fellow Salta Senator Juan Carlos Romero announced that they would be leaving the majority block.
