= José Luis Zavalía =

Argentine politician (born 1954)

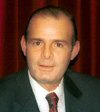
José Luis Zavalía

José Luis Zavalía (born 27 February 1954 in Santiago del Estero) is a lawyer and an Argentine politician of the Radical Civic Union. He served as a national Senator between 2001 and 2007 and previously held political positions in his province of Santiago del Estero.

Zavalía was educated at the Escuela Manuel Belgrano in Santiago del Estero and studied at the National University of Córdoba where he graduated as a lawyer. He married Liliana Lorenzo, with whom he has two sons.

Zavalía was twice Mayor of Santiago del Estero (1987-1991; 1999-2001). He served on the constitutional reform body in 1994 and was a member of the Argentine Chamber of Deputies from 1994 until 1999.

Zavalía was elected to the Senate in 2001 and took his seat in January 2002. Later in 2002, he stood as the Radical candidate to be governor of Santiago del Estero Province. He came second with 12% of the votes, losing heavily to the Justicialist Party's Carlos Díaz. Zavalía left the Senate in 2007.

During the turbulent 1990s, Zavalía was a prominent figure in the demonstrations against corruption in his province, leading marches against systematic electoral fraud on horseback. He wrote an account of these times in his book Rebelión a caballo ('Rebellion on horseback'). He was also a target of demonstrators himself. At that time he defended his home with gunshots. In 2002, public sector workers burned tyres and refuse in front of his house to demand back pay.
