= Antonio Domingo Bussi =

Argentine army general and politician (1926–2011)

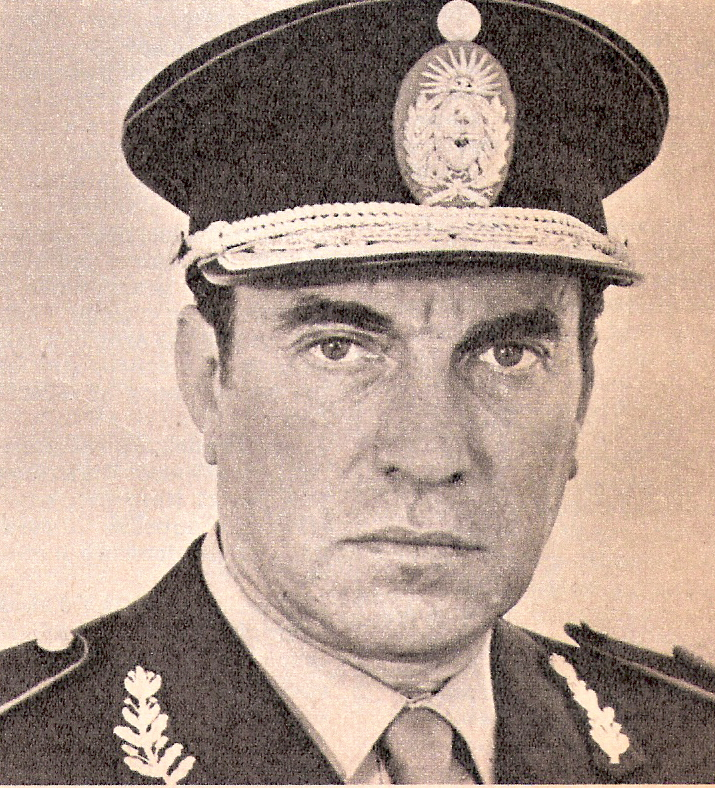

Governor of Tucumán
- In office 28 October 1995 – 28 October 1999
- Lieutenant: Raúl Topa
- Preceded by: Ramón Ortega
- Succeeded by: Julio Miranda

Governor of Tucumán
- In office 24 March 1976 – 31 December 1977
- Preceded by: Amado Juri
- Succeeded by: Lino Montiel Forzano

Personal details
- Born: 17 January 1926 Victoria, Entre Ríos, Argentina
- Died: 24 November 2011 (aged 85) San Miguel de Tucumán, Tucumán Province, Argentina
- Party: Republican Force
- Spouse(s): Josefina Beatriz Bigoglio de Bussi; 4 children
- Profession: Career Argentine military officer (retired with rank of General)

Antonio Domingo Bussi (17 January 1926 – 24 November 2011) was an army general during the military dictatorship in Argentina and a politician prominent in the recent history of Tucumán Province, Argentina. He was tried and convicted for crimes against humanity (torture, kidnapping and genocide).

== Life and times ==
=== Early career ===
Bussi was born in Victoria in Argentina's Entre Ríos Province on 17 January 1926. He entered the National Military College in 1943 and graduated in 1947 as a second lieutenant in the Army's Infantry Division. He was assigned to Regiment 28 in the city of Goya, and was later made an instructor in the General San Martín Lyceum. Promoted to captain in 1954, he entered the War College to train as a staff officer, and remained there three years transferring to the Army's Mountain Division in Mendoza Province. He married Josefina Beatriz Bigoglio; the couple had four children.

Bussi was designated Master of military logistics by the Army High Command, and he taught the discipline in the General Luis María Campos War College. In that capacity, he was sent to receive further instruction at the Command and General Staff College, in Fort Leavenworth, Kansas. Appointed lieutenant colonel upon his return in 1964, he briefly served as Chief of Staff at Army Headquarters.

Named head of the 19th Mountain Infantry Regiment in Tucumán Province, in 1969 he was sent as part of an Argentine Army commission of observers to the Vietnam War theatre, and returned to Army Headquarters in a bureaucratic capacity. Bussi was promoted to brigadier general in 1975, named head of the Tenth Infantry Brigade of the city of Buenos Aires, and in December, he was tapped to replace General Acdel Vilas as commander of Operativo Independencia, a military offensive ordered early that year by President Isabel Perón to counter a growing People's Revolutionary Army (ERP) insurgency in Tucumán, which had already resulted in the deaths of at least 43 troops and 160 insurgents.

=== Tucumán ===
Bussi moved the secret detention center that his predecessor had installed in Famaillá to a more remote, rural location, and ordered the use of torture. The move was made to evade inspections by international human rights agencies, by concealing or transferring prisoners prior to their visits. The 24 March 1976, military coup resulted in Bussi's appointment as Governor of Tucumán, and in the worsening of an already repressive human and legal rights situation.

The report of the Congressional Commission on Human Rights Violations in the province of Tucumán described the Bussi administration as a vast repressive apparatus, directed mainly against labor union leaders, political figures, academics and students (many of whom were known to be unrelated to the climate of left-wing violence in evidence during the early 1970s). However, according to Professor Paul H. Lewis, author of Guerrillas and Generals: The Dirty War in Argentina, a large percentage of the disappeared in Tucumán were indeed students, professors and recent graduates of the local university, who had been caught providing supplies and information to the guerrillas. Justice Minister Ricardo Gil Lavedra, who formed part of the 1985 tribunal judging the military crimes committed during the Dirty War would later go on record saying that "I sincerely believe that the majority of the victims of the illegal repression were guerrilla militants". After handing over command of the 5th Mountain Brigade to Bussi in mid-December 1975, Brigadier-General Acdel Vilas (who had largely defeated the rural insurgency in Tucuman) later wrote that he received a telephone call after Christmas from Bussi and that he commented, "Vilas, you've left me with nothing much to do."

The Argentine military maintained in early 1976 that the guerrillas still posed a serious problem, although they expressed guarded optimism that they were gaining control of the situation. The Baltimore Sun reported at the time, "In the jungle-covered mountains of Tucuman, long known as 'Argentina's garden', Argentines are fighting Argentines in a Vietnam-style civil war. So far, the outcome is in doubt. But there is no doubt about the seriousness of the combat, which involves 2,000 or so leftist guerrillas and perhaps as many as 10,000 soldiers."

In all, 293 servicemen and policemen were killed in left wing terrorist incidents between 1975 and 1976. Combating a recently formed ERP alliance in Tucumán with the Montoneros, an extremist group better known for attacks and kidnappings in urban areas, Bussi achieved a major success on 13 February 1976, when his parachute forces on loan from the elite Córdoba-based 4th Airborne Brigade ambushed and defeated the elite 65-strong Montoneros jungle company sent to rekindle the insurgency in Tucuman. Despite this defeat, the ERP reinforced the guerrilla front with their "Decididos de Córdoba" Company from Córdoba province and 24 armed clashes took place in 1976, resulting in the deaths of 74 guerrillas and 18 soldiers and police in Tucumán province. The Argentine Army 4th Airborne Infantry Brigade and local police scored further successes in mid-April in the city of Córdoba, when in a series of raids it captured and later killed some 300 militants entrusted with supporting the ERP military operations.

A Police Investigations Brigade was formed to attach selected policemen to Army shock troops, and these units were responsible for, among other civilian attacks, the bombing of the National University of Tucumán, the Provincial Legislature, the local headquarters of the centrist Radical Civic Union, the Communist Party, the Socialist Party, and the Tucumán Bar Association. Lawyers were intimidated into refusing to defend captured guerrillas and their sympathizers, and those who proved uncooperative had their offices ransacked or bombed. Some lawyers were assassinated outright. Doctors, politicians and trade unionists were also subject to kidnapping, unlawful imprisonment and torture. Bussi's personal role in the atrocities included the murder of detainees with his own hands in at least three cases. Bussi was known for requiring his prisoners to recite the Our Father and the Hail Mary, exhorting them to give thanks for having lived one day longer.

His administration was efficient economically. An expressway connecting the capital to suburbs to the north was completed, as well as numerous schools, parks, and clinics. The Swedish industrial firm Scania opened a facility in Colombres during his tenure that remains the fourth-largest maker of freight trucks and buses in the country. However, Bussi used his office to amass more than three million dollars in property and real estate (at 1976-77 prices), and expropriated large numbers of properties without compensation; among his administration's more bizarre crimes was the expulsion of 25 homeless men to mountainous, neighboring Catamarca Province in the dead of winter and without provisions of any kind.

A June 1976 operation succeeded in capturing People's Revolutionary Army (ERP) leader Mario Roberto Santucho, who was taken alive and died in a military hospital. His body was frozen and later publicly displayed by Bussi at the dictatorship's Museum of Subversion, outside Buenos Aires. Argentine intelligence officers in 1995 claimed ERP guerrillas were responsible for the deaths of at least 700 people in addition to scores of attacks on police and military units as well as kidnappings and robberies. Bussi was made second in command of the base upon his removal as governor in 1977, and retired from active duty in 1981 with the rank of general.

=== Following the dictatorship ===
The restoration of democracy in 1983 led to the indictments of dozens of members of the armed forces of various human rights violations, including General Bussi. Litigation against Bussi and hundreds of others was suspended by the December 1986 "Full Stop Law", which limited indictments to those that could be secured within 60 days of its enactment. The law was sponsored by President Raúl Alfonsín as a result of military pressure. Bussi was thus spared trial on charges of unlawful imprisonment, torture, murder and of falsifying documents. In late 1990, before any trials could commence against him and fellow officers, President Carlos Menem pardoned him as well as 64 left-wing guerrilla commanders, including the ERP successor, Enrique Haroldo Gorriarán Merlo, mastermind of the 1989 assault on an army barracks. In a televised address to the nation, President Menem said, "I have signed the decrees so we may begin to rebuild the country in peace, in liberty and in justice... We come from long and cruel confrontations. There was a wound to heal." Lieutenant-General Félix Martín Bonnet, commander of the Argentine Army at the time, welcomed the pardons as an "inspiration of the armed forces, not only because those who had been their commanders were deprived of their freedom, but because many of their present members fought, and did so, in fulfillment of express orders."

Free from litigation, Bussi ran as a candidate for governor in 1987 on the conservative, "Provincial Defense/White Flag" ticket. Obtaining a surprising 18% of the vote, the showing (and his base of support among large provincial landowners) encouraged him to form the Republican Force party and run for governor in 1991. He led the polls during much of the campaign, though the Justicialist Party's selection of a popular singer, Ramón "Palito" Ortega, led to his defeat. Support from sugar plantation owners, who created the "Patriotic Fund" for a 1995 campaign, and Ortega's own lackluster performance as governor, led to Bussi's election to the post in 1995. During his tenure, he had an important railyard cooperative in Tafí Viejo shuttered and faced charges of embezzlement for failing to disclose a Swiss bank account worth over US$ 100,000; when pressed on the issue, Bussi refused to confirm or deny the allegations.

The Republican Force party nominated Bussi's son, Ricardo Bussi Bigoglio, as a candidate for governor in 1999, though his father's sagging approval led to the election of Justicialist candidate Julio Miranda. The aging Bussi, in turn, was elected to the Lower House of Congress that year. Congress rejected the certification due to his prominent role in crimes against humanity and evidence of massive, ongoing embezzlement. His election in 2003 as Mayor of San Miguel de Tucumán by 17 votes was likewise rejected and he was arrested on 15 October 2003 for his role in the 1976 disappearance of Congressman Guillermo Vargas Aignasse.

Following the newly elected President Néstor Kirchner pledge to prosecute Dirty War-era crimes, and Congress' 2003 rescission of the Full Stop and Due Obedience Laws which had sheltered the military officers and ERP, Montoneros, and other guerrilla commanders guilty of human-right abuses, Bussi became a defendant in more than 600 cases. The Federal Appeals Court of Tucumán ruled in December 2004 that the crimes committed during his term as governor constituted crimes against humanity, were not subject to statutes of limitations, and thus subject to prosecution.

Bussi was ordered by judge Jorge Parache to be held under house arrest, but in July 2007 the Argentine Supreme Court ruled that Congress had exceeded its constitutional authority in denying Bussi his seat; the ruling did not supersede his ban from Congress as a convicted felon. Further charges resulted in his 28 August 2008, sentence of life imprisonment without benefit of house arrest.

Bussi described himself as the victim of political persecution, and thanked the soldiers who helped him to fight communism.

Bussi died on 24 November 2011, aged 85. He was under house arrest at Yerba Buena at the time, but he was taken to a hospital in San Miguel de Tucumán the previous week due to failing health.
