= Eduardo Torres (politician) =

Argentine politician

National Senator
- In office 12 December 2007 – 10 December 2011
- Constituency: Misiones

Personal details
- Party: Front for the Renewal of Concordia

Eduardo Enrique "Balero" Torres is an Argentine politician. Formerly active in the Radical Civic Union, he sat in the Argentine Senate representing Misiones Province in the majority block of the Front for Victory from 2007 to 2011.

Torres served as a provincial deputy. He was President of the provincial Radical party but, like many Radicals in Misiones, became part of the cross-party Front for the Renewal of Concordia, formed to support the Justicialist governor Carlos Rovira and which also supports the national government of President Cristina Fernández de Kirchner and her predecessor Néstor Kirchner.

Torres served from 2003 until 2007 as head of the Misiones state lottery. He became a senator in 2007 replacing Maurice Closs upon his election as Governor of Misiones.
