= Vilma Ibarra =

Argentine politician

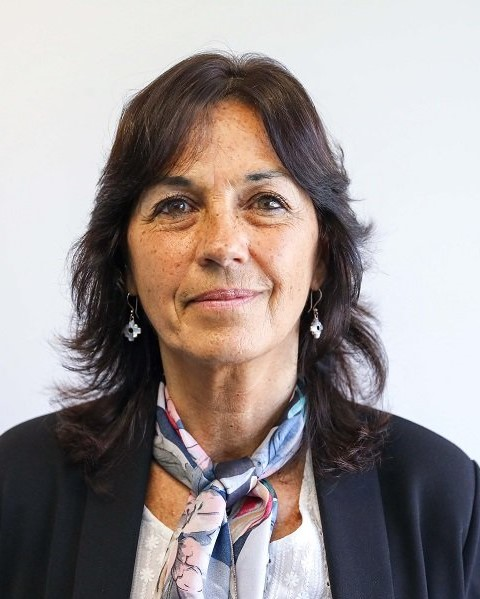

Legal and Technical Secretary of the Presidency
- In office 10 December 2019 – 10 December 2023
- President: Alberto Fernández
- Preceded by: Pablo Clusellas
- Succeeded by: Javier Herrera Bravo

National Deputy
- In office 10 December 2007 – 10 December 2011
- Constituency: City of Buenos Aires

National Senator
- In office 10 December 2001 – 10 December 2007
- Constituency: City of Buenos Aires

Personal details
- Born: 21 May 1960 (age 66) Lomas de Zamora, Argentina
- Party: Broad Front (until 2007); Independent (2007–present)
- Other political affiliations: Frepaso (1996–1999); Front for Victory (2003–2011); Frente de Todos (2019–present)
- Domestic partner: Alberto Fernández (2005–2014)
- Profession: Lawyer

Vilma Lidia Ibarra (born 21 May 1960) is an Argentine lawyer and politician, formerly a Senator and National Deputy representing Buenos Aires. From 2019 to 2023, she served as the Legal and Technical Secretary of the Presidency under President Alberto Fernández.

Ibarra was born in Lomas de Zamora, Buenos Aires Province, and moved to the city of Buenos Aires in 1966. She studied at the Colegio Nacional de Buenos Aires, where she led the communist youth wing. She graduated in law at the University of Buenos Aires, and worked as a lawyer. She is the sister of Aníbal Ibarra, the former Chief of the Buenos Aires government.

In 1996, Ibarra became a national deputy and Secretary of the Frepaso block in the Chamber. In 1999, she was elected to the Senate. In 2000, she became a city councillor in Buenos Aires, taking a leading role in her brother's administration. In 2001, she was re-elected to the Senate. Since 2003, she has been a supporter of Peronist President Néstor Kirchner. In August 2004, Ibarra proposed legislation to legalise abortion. In 2007, she suggested legislative changes to permit same-sex marriage.

In 2007, Ibarra stepped down from the Senate and was re-elected as a national deputy for Buenos Aires, second on the list of Kirchner's Front for Victory.

Political offices
Preceded by Pablo Clusellas	Legal and Technical Secretary; 2019–2023	Succeeded by Javier Herrera Bravo
