= Dora Sánchez =

Argentine politician (1949–2011)

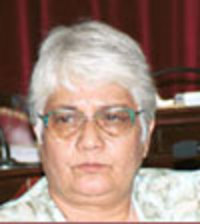

National Senator
- In office 10 December 2003 – 10 December 2009
- Constituency: Corrientes

Personal details
- Born: 27 August 1949 Sauce, Corrientes Province, Argentina
- Died: 24 January 2011 (aged 61) Buenos Aires, Argentina
- Party: Radical Civic Union
- Occupation: Politician
- Profession: Teacher

María Dora "Anahí" Sánchez (27 August 1949 – 24 January 2011) was an Argentine teacher and politician from the Radical Civic Union, who served as National Senator for Corrientes Province from 2003 to 2009.

== Biography ==
Born in Sauce (Corrientes) in 1949, she was a national normal teacher since 1967, working in the city of Mercedes. She served in the private sphere between 1975 and 1989.

She began her political career in 1989 as Secretary of the Deliberative Council of Mercedes, until 1991 when she was elected councilor in that town, with a mandate until 1995. From that year until 2003 she was director of Culture in the Municipality of Mercedes, designated by the then mayor Ricardo Colombi.

In 2003 she was elected national senator for the province of Corrientes, with a mandate until 2009. In that period she was a member of the Administrative and Municipal Affairs commissions; Agriculture, Livestock and fishing; Rights and Guarantees; Health and Sports; Environment and Sustainable Development; and Federal Tax Co-participation.

In 2007 sha was conventional in the reform of the Constitution of the Province of Corrientes.

At the party level, she chaired the Committee of the Radical Civic Union of the city of Mercedes between 1999 and 2001, being elected again in 2003.

She died in January 2011 at the age of 61 while she was admitted to the Hospital Británico de Buenos Aires.

== See also ==
- Politics of Argentina
- List of former Argentine Senators
