= Judith Forstmann =

Argentine politician (1945–2009)

Selva Judith Forstmann

National Senator
- In office 14 August 2006 – 10 April 2009
- Preceded by: Alicia Kirchner
- Succeeded by: Jorge Banicevich
- Constituency: Santa Cruz

Personal details
- Born: 1952
- Died: 10 April 2009 (aged 56–57) Santa Cruz Province
- Party: Justicialist Party
- Spouse(s): Family= Emilio Papousek, Andres Papousek, Pablo Papousek, Wim Forstmann, Martin Forstmann, Tomas Forstmann, Jeremias Forstmann,

Selva Judit Forstmann (1945 - 10 April 2009) was an Argentine Justicialist Party politician. She sat in the Argentine Senate representing Santa Cruz Province in the majority block of the Front for Victory.

Forstmann was educated in Buenos Aires and La Plata. She moved to the oil town Caleta Olivia in 1973 and worked locally in education and the arts. She became a city councillor in 1991.

In 1993 Forstmann was elected to the provincial legislature of Santa Cruz. She was re-elected in 1997, 1999 and 2003. In the Santa Cruz Chamber of Deputies she was vice-president of the Justicialist Party block from 1995, 2nd vice-president of the Chamber from 1999 and 1st vice-president from 2006. Due to various resignations and vacancies, she was acting President of the Chamber that year, and as a consequence was de facto vice-governor of the province. She was appointed to the national Senate in 2007 to fill the vacancy left since Alicia Kirchner left to join the government of President Néstor Kirchner in August 2006.

On 10 April 2009, Forstmann and her husband were travelling in a four-wheel drive in Santa Cruz with a fishing guide. The car was swept away by the current of the river Barrancosa . The two men were saved but Forstmann was dragged away and was found dead the next morning.
