= Mirian Curletti =

Argentine politician

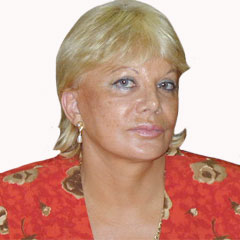
Portrait of Mirian Curletti.

Mirian Belén Curletti is an Argentine Radical Civic Union (UCR) politician from Chaco Province, previously representing that Province in the Argentine Senate.

Curletti graduated as a librarian from the Universidad Nacional del Nordeste, Resistencia in 1966 and in economics from the same institution in 1973. In 2000, she gained a masters in foreign affairs from the UNNE. She became an academic and an expert in agricultural development, working at the UNNE, the government of Chaco and in Israel.

In 1997, Curletti was elected to the Argentine Chamber of Deputies for Chaco Province, serving until 2001 when she was elected to the Senate. She was the first Vice-president of the Senate and a leading UCR senator until she lost her seat in 2007.
