= Mario Daniele =

Argentine politician (born 1961)

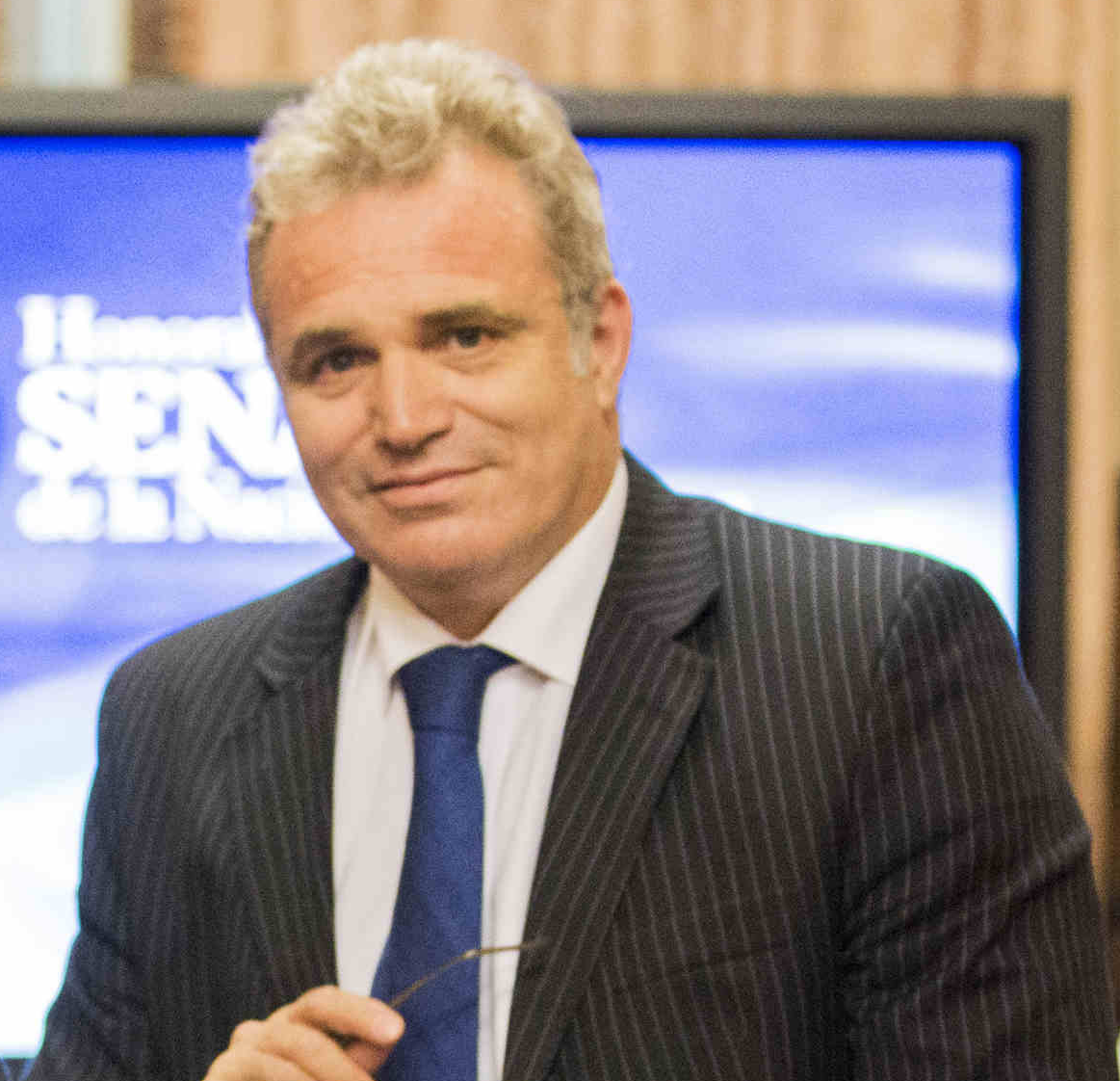
Mario Domingo Daniele

Mario Domingo Daniele (born November 19, 1961, in San Justo, Buenos Aires) was an Argentine Justicialist Party Senator representing Tierra del Fuego.

He was elected to the Senate in 2001. Previously, Daniele was active in local politics in Ushuaia, serving as President of the Department Council from 1997 to 2003. He unsuccessfully ran for Governor of Tierra del Fuego in 1995 and served as head of the Justicialist Party from 1995 to 1997.

Daniele left the Senate in 2007.
