= Carlos Salazar (Argentine politician) =

Argentine politician

National Senator
- In office 7 November 2007 – 10 December 2009
- Preceded by: Ricardo Bussi
- Constituency: Tucumán

Personal details
- Party: Fuerza Republicana
- Profession: Cardiologist

Carlos Eduardo Salazar is a former Argentine Senator for Tucumán Province. He is a member of Fuerza Republicana, a provincial political party founded by former general Antonio Bussi.

Salazar became a Senator in 2007 when Ricardo Bussi left the Senate to return to Tucumán as a state legislator. Prior to his election, Salazar was largely unknown and had not had a political career. He had been cardiologist to Bussi's father, General Antonio Bussi, former governor of Tucumán.
