= Celso Jaque =

Argentine politician

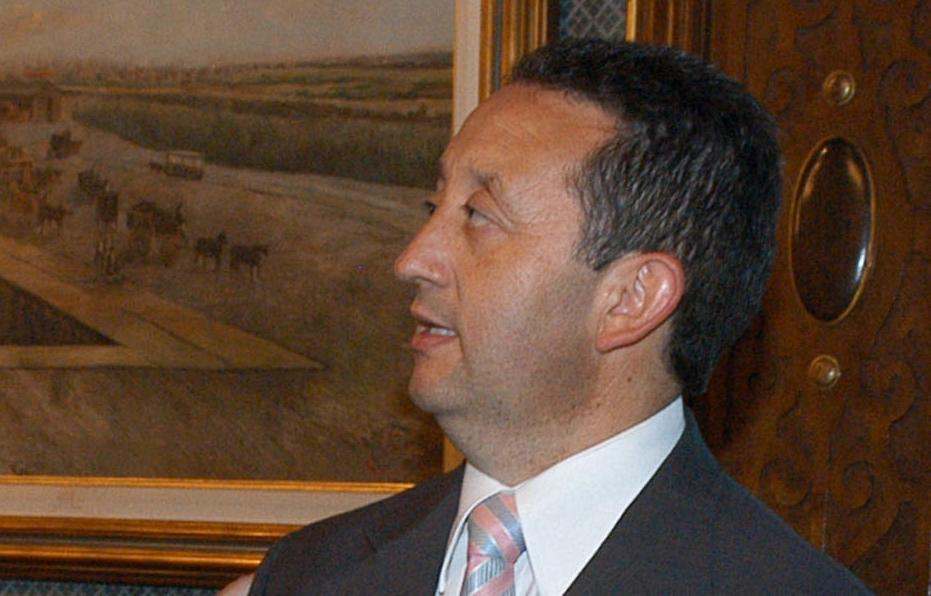

Argentine Ambassador to Colombia
- In office December 28, 2011 – January 8, 2016
- Preceded by: Martin Balza
- Succeeded by: Marcelo Stubrin
- Constituency: Mendoza

Governor of Mendoza
- In office December 10, 2007 – December 9, 2011
- Preceded by: Julio Cobos
- Succeeded by: Francisco Pérez

National Senator
- In office December 10, 2003 – December 10, 2007
- Succeeded by: Mónica Troadello

Personal details
- Born: September 24, 1960 (age 65) Malargüe, Mendoza
- Party: Justicialist Party; Front for Victory
- Profession: Public accountant

Celso Alejandro Jaque (born September 24, 1960) is an Argentine Justicialist Party (PJ) politician, former Argentine Ambassador to Colombia, former governor of Mendoza Province and a former senator.

Born in Malargüe, Mendoza, Jaque graduated as an accountant at the National University of Cuyo. He joined the Justicialists in 1983, and was elected to the Provincial Legislature in 1991, serving until 1995, when he was elected Mayor of Malargüe. He was re-elected in 1999 and in 2003, was elected to the Argentine Senate.

Jaque chaired the Federal revenue sharing committee until 2005, and the Infrastructure committee until 2007. He was elected Governor of Mendoza in October 2007, replacing Julio Cobos, who was elected Vice President of Argentina. The governor of the fourth most important district in Argentina, Jaque's support was courted by the faction of the Justicialist Party opposed to Kirchnerism. He remained an ally, however, of the embattled President Cristina Kirchner, who lost the support of Vice President Cobos and most Mendoza Justicialists during the 2008 Argentine government conflict with the agricultural sector.

Political offices
Preceded by Julio Cobos	Governor of Mendoza; 2007—2011	Succeeded by Francisco Pérez
