= Roberto Urquía =

Argentine politician and businessman

Roberto Daniel Urquía (born December 24, 1948) is an Argentine accountant, politician, and businessman who served as a national senator for Córdoba Province from 2003 to 2009. He is a member of the Justicialist Party and serves as chairman of Aceitera General Deheza (AGD), one of Argentina's largest agroindustrial conglomerates.

== Early life and education ==
Urquía was born on December 24, 1948, in General Deheza, a town in Córdoba Province. He studied accounting and business administration at the National University of Córdoba, where he also worked as a teacher. Between 1980 and 1990, he served as president of Club Atlético Acción Juvenil Tiro y Gimnasia in General Deheza.

Urquía joined the family business, Aceitera General Deheza (AGD), in the late 1960s, a company founded by his father Adrián Pascual Urquía in 1948. He later became chairman and director of the AGD industrial group alongside his brothers and cousin.

== Political career ==
Urquía began his political career as a member of the Justicialist Party. In 1983, he was elected as a councillor for the General Deheza municipality. He subsequently served as mayor of General Deheza for three consecutive terms (1987–1999), with his final two terms won without opposition through agreements with radicals and local civic groups. In 1999, he was elected to the provincial Senate for Juárez Celman Department, where he chaired the economy and finance committee. He later served in the provincial legislature from 2001 to 2003. Urquía was elected to the Argentine Senate in 2003 as part of the Unión por Córdoba alliance. He joined the Front for Victory parliamentary bloc, supporting the government of President Néstor Kirchner. During his tenure, he chaired the Senate committee on Regional Economies, Micro, Small and Medium Enterprises, and served as a member of several other committees including Industry and Commerce, Agriculture, Livestock and Fisheries, and National Economy and Investment. In 2007, Urquía was chosen by President Cristina Fernández de Kirchner to head the Front for Victory's list of candidates for the Chamber of Deputies in Córdoba. The list finished third in the province, and although elected, Urquía chose to remain in the Senate. His term expired on December 10, 2009.
