= Norberto Massoni =

Argentine politician

Norberto Massoni (January 29, 1935 – April 27, 2010) was a former Argentine Senator for Chubut Province. He was a member of the Radical Civic Union.

Massoni qualified as a lawyer at the University of Buenos Aires in 1961. In the 1960s and 1970s he worked on behalf of various public bodies in Chubut. He was director of the Bank of the province of Chubut 1970–72 and became minister of economy of the province 1972–73.

Massoni returned to politics in 1984, becoming minister of culture and education of the province until 1985. He served as education and justice minister 1995–99. He headed the legal advisory team at the municipality of Comodoro Rivadavia 1999–2002 and was President of the province-owned bank Banco del Chubut S.A. 2002–03.

Massoni was elected to the Senate in 2003. In 2005 he was sworn onto the Council of Magistracy of the Nation. His term as Senator expired on December 10, 2009.
