= Silvia Gallego =

Argentine politician (born 1948)

Silvio Gallego
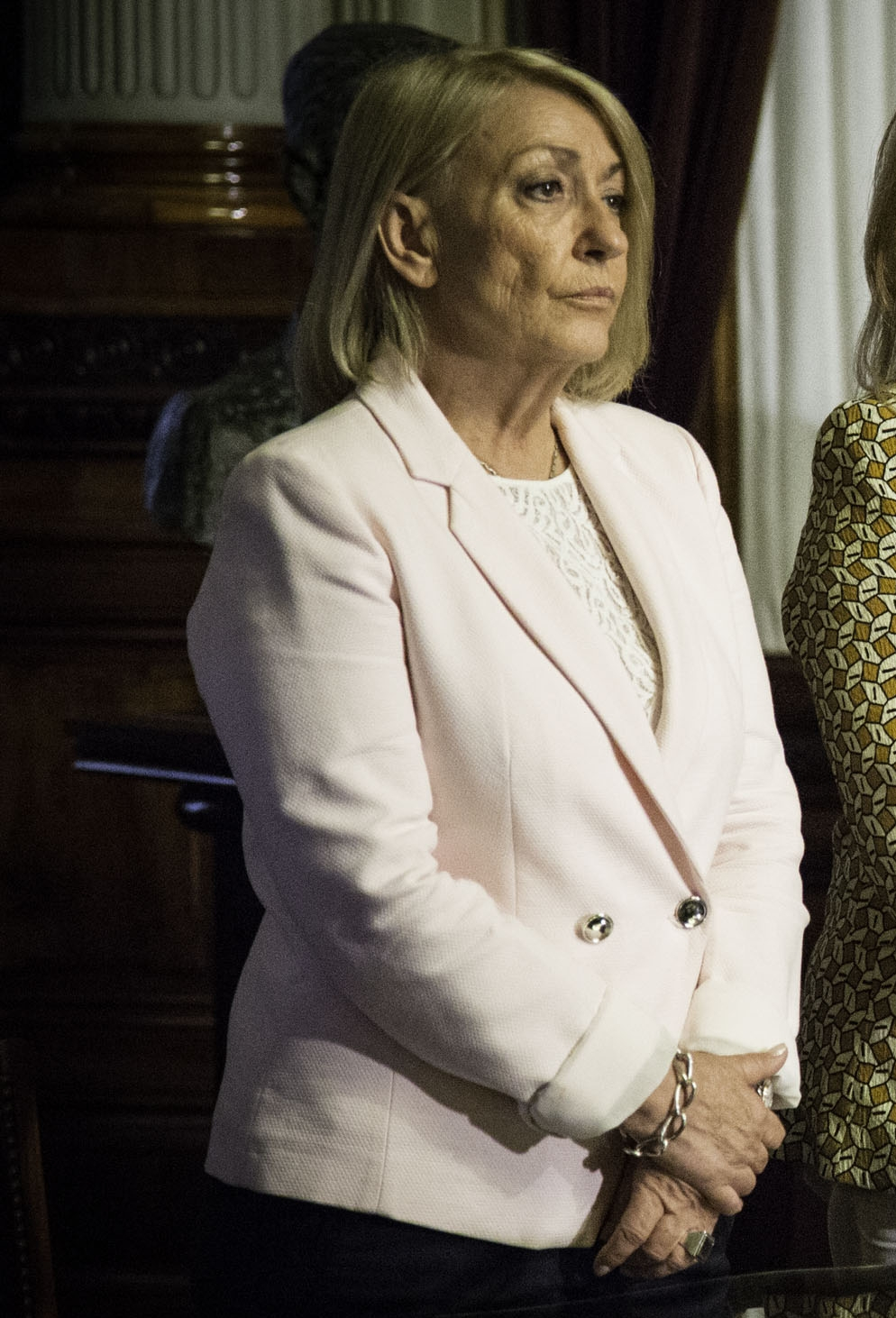

National Senator
- In office December 10, 2003 – December 10, 2009
- Succeeded by: María Higonet
- Constituency: La Pampa

Personal details
- Born: 1948 (age 77–78) General Pico, Argentina
- Party: Justicialist Party

Silvia Ester Gallego de Soto (born 1948) is a former Argentine Senator for La Pampa Province. She is a member of the Justicialist Party. She was part of the majority Front for Victory parliamentary group, supporting the national government of President Néstor Kirchner. Her term expired December 10, 2009 and she was appointed a director of the state-owned bank Banco de la Nación Argentina afterwards.
