= Ramón Saadi =

Argentine politician (1949–2023)

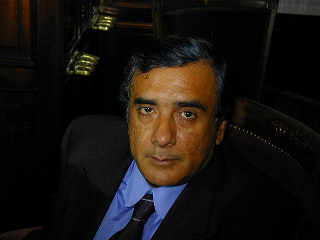

National Senator
- In office 10 December 2003 – 10 December 2009
- Constituency: Catamarca
- In office 10 December 1987 – 10 July 1988
- Constituency: Catamarca

National Deputy
- In office 10 December 1991 – 10 December 2003
- Constituency: Catamarca

Governor of Catamarca
- In office 10 July 1988 – 28 April 1991
- Preceded by: Vicente Saadi
- Succeeded by: Luis Prol
- In office 10 December 1983 – 10 December 1987
- Preceded by: Arnoldo Castillo
- Succeeded by: Vicente Saadi

Personal details
- Born: 6 February 1949 San Fernando del Valle de Catamarca, Catamarca Province, Argentina
- Died: 8 February 2023 (aged 74) San Fernando del Valle de Catamarca, Catamarca Province, Argentina
- Party: Justicialist Party
- Education: University of Buenos Aires
- Occupation: Lawyer

Ramón Eduardo Saadi (6 February 1949 – 8 February 2023) was an Argentine senator and governor for Catamarca Province and a member of the Argentine Justicialist Party. He was a member of the Saadi family that has dominated Catamarca politics since the 1940s and a son of Vicente Saadi who first became governor of the province in 1949.

== Life and career ==
Born in San Fernando del Valle de Catamarca to a father of Syrian descent, Saadi studied law at the University of Buenos Aires, graduating in 1977. He was president of the Peronist youth wing of Catamarca, and in 1982 was named editor of the newspaper La Voz.

Saadi was elected governor of Catamarca in 1983. In 1987, after his term expired, he was elected Senator and was succeeded as governor by his own father, Vicente Saadi. The elder Saadi died in 1988, however, and Ramón Saadi returned to Catamarca to be elected governor once again. The 1990 murder of María Soledad Morales by two youths whose fathers were linked to Governor Saadi led to a national outcry, and ultimately to the governor's removal by federal intervention on 28 April 1991.

Saadi was, despite the controversy, elected to the Argentine Chamber of Deputies that September, and was twice re-elected, serving until 2003. He was returned to the Senate that year, as part of the Front for Victory caucus of President Néstor Kirchner, although having been previously an ally of Carlos Menem. His term expired on 10 December 2009.

Saadi died on 9 February 2023, at the age of 74.
