= Silvia Giusti =

Argentine politician

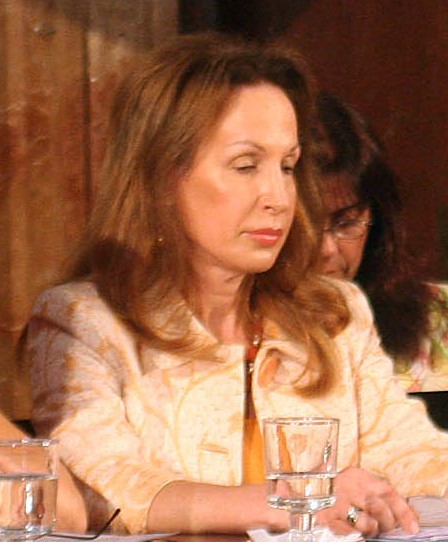
Silvia Giusti

Silvia Ester Giusti is a former Argentine Senator for Chubut Province. She is a member of the Argentine Justicialist Party.

Giusti was born in Arrecifes, Buenos Aires Province and studied to be a teacher of Literature and Spanish. In 1975, she moved to Chubut and continued her studies in Education at the Universidad Nacional de la Patagonia San Juan Bosco. She worked in education and coordinated education policies for the 1999 Peronists' campaign in Trelew.

Giusti is a widow with two children.

Giusti was elected a councillor in Trelew in 1999.

She was elected to the national Senate in 2003 and presided over the Agriculture, Livestock and Fisheries committee. She was a member of the Front for Victory caucus of President Néstor Kirchner and her term ended in 2009. Afterwards, she was appointed a director to the province-owned bank Banco del Chubut S.A. by Chubut governor Mario das Neves.
