= Mónica Troadello =

Argentine politician

National Senator
- In office 10 December 2007 – 10 December 2009
- Preceded by: Celso Jaque
- Succeeded by: Rolando Bermejo
- Constituency: Mendoza

Personal details
- Born: 1955 (age 70–71)
- Party: Justicialist Party
- Profession: Lawyer

Mónica Troadello (born 1955) is an Argentine politician and a member of the Justicialist Party. She is a former Senator for Mendoza Province and was part of the majority Front for Victory parliamentary group.

Troadello, a lawyer by profession, had served at the provincial Irrigation Department since 1997. A former follower of José Octavio Bordón, she was attracted to active politics by Carlos Abihaggle, former candidate for the governorship of Mendoza.

Troadello entered the Senate in 2007 to complete the term of Celso Jaque who had been elected Governor of Mendoza. She had been third on the list for the Justicialists in the 2005 elections.
