= Carlos Rossi =

Argentine politician (born 1949)

Carlos Alberto Rossi (born December 6, 1949) is a member of the provincial 'Neighbourly Union' (Unión Vecinal) and was elected as part of the Alliance New Front, an electoral alliance with the New Party. Rossi, a lawyer by profession, was a civil servant at Córdoba municipality before entering politics.

Rossi was born in Barrio Colón, a neighbourhood of Córdoba city. He attended the local Colegio Santo Tomás and learnt violin at the provincial music conservatory. He played for Club Atlético Talleres as goalkeeper in their reserve team. He qualified as a lawyer, notary and procurator at the National University of Córdoba.

At 18, Rossi began work with Córdoba municipality as a food safety inspector. In 1975 he returned to the municipality in the legal division. From 1984 to 1989 he was head of the city's civil register. In 1991 he was appointed sub-secretary general of the municipality and in 1994 he became secretary for public involvement and development, serving until 1998. He also chaired the city emergency committee 1991–98.

In 1998 Rossi resigned his public positions to enter politics. He stood as the Unión Vecinal candidate for Mayor of Córdoba in 1999 and was elected as a city councillor the same year. He was leader of the Unión caucus in the city council.

In 2003 he was elected as a senator for Córdoba Province. His term ended in 2009.

Rossi is married to Angélica Kronemann and has four children.
