= María Colombo de Acevedo =

Argentine politician (1975–2021)

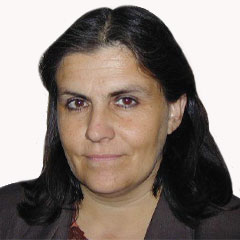

National Senator
- In office 10 December 2001 – 10 December 2009
- Constituency: Catamarca

National Deputy
- In office 10 December 1997 – 10 December 2001
- Constituency: Catamarca

Personal details
- Born: 1957 San Fernando del Valle de Catamarca, Argentina
- Died: 3 May 2021 (aged 63–64) San Fernando del Valle de Catamarca, Argentina
- Party: Radical Civic Union
- Other political affiliations: Civic and Social Front of Catamarca
- Occupation: Politician

María Teresita del Valle Colombo de Acevedo (1957 – 3 May 2021) was an Argentine politician who was a Senator for the province Catamarca and a member of the Radical Civic Union, which itself formed part of the Civic and Social Front of Catamarca.

== Biography ==
Colombo was born in San Fernando del Valle de Catamarca. She studied at the Universidad Nacional de Córdoba, graduating in medicine, and studied politics as a postgraduate.

Colombo served as a provincial senator in Catamarca Province 1991–95. and was Senate president in 1994. She was elected to the Argentine Chamber of Deputies for 1997–2001 and became a senator in 2001. She was re-elected in 2003 for a six-year term, which expired on 10 December 2009.

Colombo died on 3 May 2021, at the age of 64, as a result of a thrombosis caused by her contagion from COVID-19.
