= Haide Giri =

Argentine politician

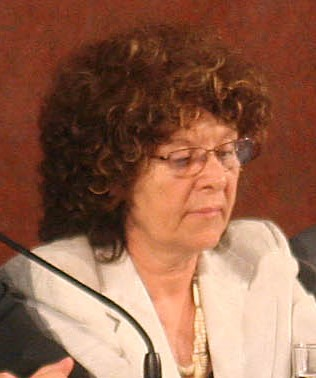
Haide Giri

Haide Delia Giri (born 1952) is a former Argentine Senator for Córdoba Province. She is a member of the Argentine Justicialist Party.

== Biography ==
Giri was born and raised in the city of General Pico, La Pampa Province, She moved to Córdoba during her youth to study at the university. She graduated as a surgeon at the Medical Science Faculty of the National University of Córdoba, a title which was later co-validated by the University of Madrid.

Between the years 1974 and 1976, she served as Under-Secretary of Social Action at the Córdoba City Council. In 1993 she was elected Provincial Senator for the Capital Department and formed her own parliamentary group until the end of her mandate in 1997.

Two years later Giri joined the Ministry of Health of the Province of Córdoba as a Director of Social Action and Director of the Support Unit of the Integral Assistance Program of Córdoba (P.A.I.Cor), dependent on the General Government Secretary. In 2001 she was appointed as the General Director of Medical Attention. This same year she took the position of Health Secretary of the Province and then Health Secretary of the City of Córdoba. In 2002 she was designated as General Secretary for the Government of the Province of Córdoba.

In July 2003, Giri was named President of DACYT until December of that same year, when she was sworn in as National Senator. Since then she has been part of the Front for Victory parliamentary group in support of the President, Cristina Fernández de Kirchner. She was a vice president of the Health and Sport Committee (in charge of the presidency) and a member of the National Defense, Infrastructure, Housing and Transport, Mining, Energy and Fuel, Tourism and Population and Human Development Committees. Her mandate expired on December 10, 2009.

In the Province of Córdoba, Giri is a member of the Women Provincial Council Executive Board. She was also an active member of the Parliamentarian Group of Friendship with the people of Greece. Since the year 2005 she has been a permanent member of the Inter-Parliamentary Union.
