= Fabián Ríos (politician) =

Argentine politician (1964–2022)

Mayor of Corrientes
- In office 10 December 2013 – 10 December 2017
- Preceded by: Carlos Espínola
- Succeeded by: Eduardo Tassano

National Deputy
- In office 10 December 2011 – 10 December 2013
- Constituency: Corrientes

National Senator
- In office 10 December 2003 – 10 December 2009
- Constituency: Corrientes

Personal details
- Born: 8 February 1964 Corrientes, Argentina
- Died: 3 October 2022 (aged 58)
- Party: Justicialist Party
- Profession: Electrical engineer

Roberto Fabián Ríos (8 February 1964 – 3 October 2022) was an Argentine politician. He was intendente (mayor) of Corrientes from 2013 to 2017. Prior to that, he was a National Deputy and a National Senator for Corrientes Province. He also served as an official of the state-owned bank Banco de la Nación Argentina. Ríos, an electrical engineer by profession, was a member of the Justicialist Party.

Ríos qualified as an electrical engineer at the Universidad Nacional del Nordeste (UNNE). He was active in the Peronist Youth and was President of his faculty's student union. Between 1987 and 1993 he worked in the provincial energy department. In 1995 he became an assistant to the Justicialist deputies in the Argentine Congress, becoming a government advisor in 1998. In 1999 he returned to Congress as an assistant to the Justicialist senators.

In 1999, Ríos was elected to the Corrientes provincial legislature and re-elected in 2001. In 2003 he was elected a national Senator. He joined the Front for Victory parliamentary group, supporting the national government of President Néstor Kirchner. In 2008 he took over the chairmanship of the Budget and Treasury Committee after the resignation of Sen. Roberto Urquía to this post. In 2009 he unsuccessfully ran for the Corrientes governorship, finishing in third place. His term as Senator expired on 10 December 2009 and he was appointed a director of the state-owned bank Banco de la Nación Argentina afterwards. In 2011 he was elected National Deputy for Corrientes Province.
