= Delia Pinchetti de Sierra Morales =

Argentine politician

Delia Pinchetti
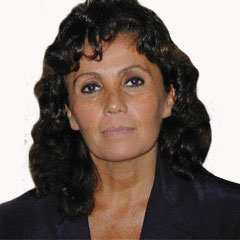

National Senator
- In office 10 December 2003 – 10 December 2009
- Constituency: Tucumán

Personal details
- Party: Fuerza Republicana
- Spouse: Ramón Sierra Morales

Delia Norma Pinchetti de Sierra Morales is an Argentine politician and a former member of Fuerza Republicana (FR).

== Biography ==
Delia Norma Pinchetti de Sierra Morales is a former Senator for Tucumán Province. She was elected in 2003 on behalf of the Republican Force, but left that party in May 2009. Pinchetti's husband, Ramón Sierra Morales, was also active in the FR and served as a provincial legislator. Ahead of the June 2009 legislative elections, Pinchetti was dropped by FR as a candidate. Subsequently she announced her departure from the party and was confirmed as the lead candidate for National Deputy for the Unión PRO Federal alliance formed by Mauricio Macri's PRO and dissident Peronists.
