= Ricardo Bussi =

Argentine lawyer and politician

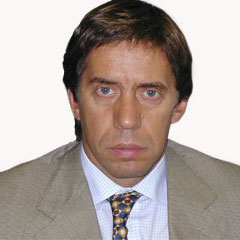
American-born Argentine politician

Ricardo Argentino Bussi (born 24 April 1964) is an American-born Argentine politician. He had been National Senator representing Tucumán Province and provincial deputy of Tucumán. He was born in Kansas City, where his father Antonio Domingo Bussi was taking a course in the United States Army Command and General Staff College. He graduated in Law from the University of Belgrano.

Bussi started his career as defender of his father, accused of crimes against humanity and working along his father who was elected Governor of Tucuman in the 1990s. He was elected as National Deputy in 1997 to 2003 and the Senator until 2007, as part of Fuerza Republicana, a party created by his father and now he is leading.
