= Republican Force =

Republican Force Fuerza Republicana
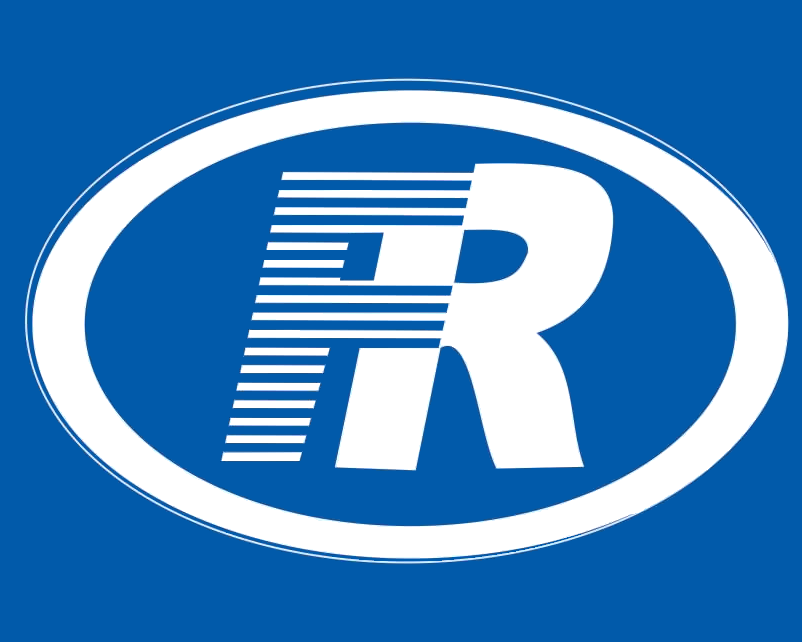
- Abbreviation: FR
- President: Ricardo Bussi
- Founder: Antonio Domingo Bussi
- Founded: 1 July 1988; 37 years ago
- Headquarters: San Lorenzo 768, San Miguel de Tucumán
- Ideology: Neo-fascism; Ultraconservatism; Denial of state terrorism in Argentina
- Political position: Far-right

Website
- fuerzarepublicana.com

The Republican Force (Spanish: Fuerza Republicana, FR) is a provincial conservative political party in Tucumán Province, Argentina. The party was set up by Antonio Domingo Bussi, who was Tucumán's governor during the early years of the National Reorganization Process.

In 2009, Fuerza Republicana had one of Tucumán's three senators, Carlos Salazar. The party's second senator, Delia Pinchetti de Sierra Morales, resigned from Republican Force in May 2009 after being dropped as a candidate, and joined the Unión Pro Federal. FR has been part of a coalition with a minor, free market-oriented party, Recreate for Growth (itself aligned to the Unión Pro).

Its leading politician, Ricardo Bussi, son of Antonio Bussi, was a senator until 2007 when he stood for election as governor of Tucumán Province without success.

== See also ==
- Category:Fuerza Republicana politicians
