= Andalgalá Department =

Andalgalá Departamento Andalgalá
- Department
- San Roque oratory in rural Andagalá

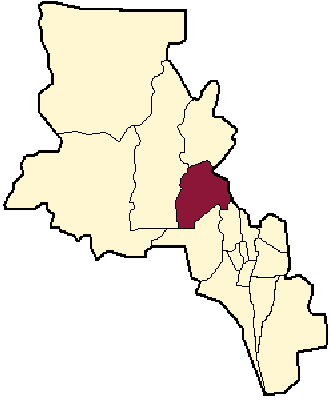
- location of in Catamarca Province
- Coordinates: 27°36′S 66°19′W
- Country: Argentina
- Established: March 1, 1822
- Founder: Don Crisanto Gómez
- Seat: Andalgalá

Government
  - Mayor: José Perea, FJ

Area
  - Total: 4,497 km^{2} (1,736 sq mi)

Population (2001 census [INDEC])
  - Total: 14,068
  - Density: 3.128/km^{2} (8.102/sq mi)
- Demonym: beleña/o
- Postal Code: K4740
- IFAM: CAT003
- Area Code: 03835
- Patron saint: ?
- Website: web.archive.org/web/20060515160921/http://www.camsencat.gov.ar/andalgal.html

Andalgalá is a central department of Catamarca Province in Argentina.

The provincial subdivision has a population of about 14,000 inhabitants in an area of 4,497 km^{2} (1,736 sq mi), and its capital city is Andalgalá, which is located around 1,435 km (892 mi) from Buenos Aires.

== Economy ==
The main contributors to the economy of Andalgalá Department are farming and mining. The Capillitas Mine is a rich source of Rhodochrosite, (Inca Rosa), as well as 87 other types of mineral, including Catamarcaite, which is named after the Province of Catamarca.

== Districts and Settlements ==
- Aconquija
- Agua de las Palomas
- Agua Verde
- Alto de las Juntas
- Amanao
- Andalgalá
- Buena Vista
- Campo El Pucará
- Chaquiago
- Choya
- Ciénaga El Pozo
- Cóndor Huasi
- El Alamito
- El Arbolito
- El Durazno
- El Espinillo
- El Lampazo
- El Lindero
- El Pantanito
- El Potrero
- Finca Juan J. Gil
- La Aguada
- La Guadita
- La Mesada
- Las Palmitas
- Las Rosas
- Ojo de Agua
- Río Potrero
- Taco Yacu
- Villa Vil
