= Capayán Department =

Capayán Departamento Capayán
- Department
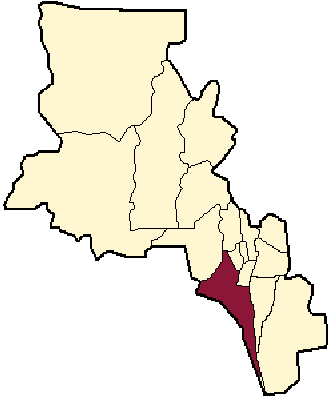
- location of Capayán Department in Catamarca Province
- Coordinates: 28°44′S 65°59′W
- Country: Argentina
- Established: ?
- Founder: ?
- Seat: Chumbicha

Government
  - Mayor: Freddy Hoffmann, UCR

Area
  - Total: 4,284 km^{2} (1,654 sq mi)

Population (2001 census [INDEC])
  - Total: 6,358
  - Density: 1.484/km^{2} (3.844/sq mi)
- Demonym: capayanense
- Postal Code: K4726
- IFAM: CAT006
- Area Code: 03833
- Patron saint: ?

Capayán is a department located in the south of Catamarca Province in Argentina.

The provincial subdivision has a population of about 6,358 inhabitants in an area of 4,284 km^{2} (1,654 sq mi), and its capital city is Chumbicha.

== Populated places ==
Municipalities	Villages and settlements
Adolfo E. Carranza; Balde de la Punta; Capayán; Chumbicha; Colonia del Valle; Colonia Nueva Coneta; Concepción; Coneta; El Bañado; Huillapima; Los Ángeles; Miraflores; Monte Redondo; San Martín; San Pablo; San Pedro	Agua Blanca; Chañarito; El Descanso; El Médano; El Potrero; El Quemado; El Rosario; La Carreta; La Estrella; La Libertad; La Montoza; Las Breas; Las Palmas; Los Cano; Los Divisaderos; Los Raigones; Nueva Coneta; Pozo Lindo; Pozo Tigre; Puesto Carrizo; Puesto Nuevo; Puestos Capayan; Puestos de Concepción; San Gabriel; San Gerónimo; Santa Ana; Sisi Huasi; Telaritos; Trampasacha; Vacas Muertas; Villa Capayán
