= History of Recreo =

Recreo began as a small Hispanic homestead which offered rest to travellers and hence its name. Prior to European settlement in the 16th century, there were indigenous people living in the area. Expansion of the settlement came when a railway through the area was completed in 1875. Since then, Recreo's progress has been interrupted at times by earthquakes and drought. In the 20th and 21st centuries, major infrastructure has been developed to meet the needs of Recreo's growing population. On 20 August 1995, Recreo was endowed with a municipal charter.

== Indigenous peoples of the Recreo area (circa 16th century) ==
In pre-Hispanic times the area of Recreo was inhabited by the Iules and Diaguitas peoples. The indigenous people were called Suries by the Inca people. It was a Quechua word from "I suri" (ostrich feathers). By 1563, the area was controlled by the Governorate of Tucumán and the word, suries had changed to juries.

The indigenous peoples of the Recreo area dug cavities known as "mortars" in the stone of the hills about their settlement. They may have been used to grind corn and other grains but more likely they were a tool for astronomical observations. When filled with water, each mortar would reflect a position of the stars.

== Hispanic settlement ==
In 1782, the Recreo area became part of the region under the control of the Quartermaster of San Miguel de Tucuman. In 1783, the region became the Municipality of Salta del Tucumán under the governance of San Fernando del Valle de Catamarca. On August 25, 1821, the region became the Catamarca Province after receiving autonomy from Tucumán Province and Santiago del Estero Province.

In the 1860s, Don Clemente Martinez took possession of some land in the province. The baptismal records of the Parish of San Roque indicate a fair population in the area by the mid 1860s. After the death of Martinez, his widow married the Provincial Deputy Governor, Pedro Cano. By 1874, the Cano family owned a cow, a mill and a chapel. The homestead became a rest point for travellers. It was a place for "recreation" and hence the place became known as "Recreo".

On May 9, 1875 a section of the railway between Cordoba and Tucaman was opened.

In 1892, Recreo was shaken by a 6.0 magnitude (very strong earthquake. Some lives were lost and there was severe damage to buildings. After the earthquake, a cemetery was developed.

At the 1895 census, 624 people had settled in Recreo. Most of the immigrants were Spanish, Italian, French, Syrian-Lebanese, and German. Many were illiterate. With this background, Recreo does not have a founding father. Some settlers were evicted by land owners.

Recreo was inaugurated and then divided into two "departments", Ancasti and La Paz.

== Twentieth century ==
In 1910, at the centenary of the May Revolution, a new school was opened in Recreo. In prior years, education was given in private homes and much of the population was illiterate. In 1914, the Estanislao Severo Zeballos public library opened.

In September 1958, by the passing of Law Number 1755, the Department of La Paz was renamed "Villa de San Antonio". Municipal entities such as a police force, civil registry, power plant and an hospital were founded. Travel by car and rail became more common. The railway was used to export minerals from mines in the hills around Recreo.

In the mid 20th century, there was an economic decline in Recreo due to drought. In 1962, the Motegasta Dam was constructed. Drinking water was supplied via an aqueduct. Previously, groundwater had been used. Other infrastructure created around this time included a bus station, a sports complex and an air strip.

In 1971, a secondary school was opened in Recreo by Irish Catholic priests. In 1975, a center for volunteer fire fighters was founded. In 1982, economic measures were taken such as providing ta incentives to local industries. In 1983, the regional Liborio Forte hospital opened. In 1986, developments included the opening of a tertiary education facility, a natural gas pipeline, and the construction of a large statue overlooking the town, the Cristo Redentor de Recreo (Christ the Redeemer of Recreo). Around this time, streets were covered with asphalt.

On 19 December 1986, the Recreo coat of arms was ratified by John Paul II. The Recreo population again started to expand leading to electricity and water shortages.

In 1991, a political and judicial crisis occurred in the Catamarca province when an 18-year-old student by the name of Maria Soledad Morales was raped and murdered near the city of Catamarca by the sons of some of the city's elite residents. The killers were convicted and imprisoned. This is marked as an important moment in the progress in Argentinian justice.

On 20 August 1995, Recreo received its municipal charter, making it an autonomous town.

== Twenty-first century ==
In 2004, Recreo suffered a magnitude 7.0 earthquake. In 2005, it was recognised that land for expansion in Recreo was becoming limited. On June 15, 2007, an official city flag was announced. It was coloured green for the mountains and pastures surrounding the city, created the flag of the city, its colors are green on the mountains of jarillas, quebrachos and pastures that surround the city, white salt of the Salinas Grandes and yellow for the sunshine. There was a shield positioned in the center of the flag.

In the first years of the new century, Recreo experienced the common social problems such as drug use, alcohol misuse and crime. In 2014, community police were introduced to curb these problems.

Infrastructure projects included the building of a bike path in 2003 and sewers in 2006; insertion of traffic lights in 2007; and the opening of a cultural center in 2011, a cinema and weather station in 2013 and a new bus station in 2015. Plazas and promenades were remodelled and boulevards, parks and shrines were improved. A municipal sports complex was renovated.
