= Villa Pomán =

Village in Pomán, Catamarca, Argentina

Villa Pomán is a village in the Pomán Department, Catamarca Province, Argentina.

== Geography ==
The department of Pomán rises in the western foothills of the Ambato. It is bounded to the west by the San Fernando Valley of Catamarca Pomán in the north by the department of Andalgalá, to the south by the Province of Rioja toward the South, by the department of Ambato and Capayán, toward the east and by the departments of Bethlehem and Tinogasta in the West.

The village of Pomán, has an average elevation of 1.327 m (4 feet 4 inches) above sea level. It is 164 km (102 mi) from the Argentine capital, Buenos Aires.

The village is surrounded by natural beauties. The area of Pomán is of 4.859 km^{2} (1.876 sq mi), which equals 4.8% of the area of the province.

== Architectural beauties ==
The village of Pomán possesses extraordinary tourism attractions. It is a town of mountains watered by streams which invite one to rest, to appreciate the fruits of the land or to travel through the valleys.
