= El Ancasti =

Local daily newspaper in Argentina

- Type: Daily newspaper
- Publisher: Daniel Libardi
- Founded: 1988
- Headquarters: Sarmiento 518; San Fernando del Valle de Catamarca
- Circulation: 10,000
- Website: El Ancasti

El Ancasti is a local daily newspaper published in San Fernando del Valle de Catamarca, Argentina.

El Ancasti was founded on July 8, 1988, and like the town of the same name, was named for a Cácan term referring to the Andes that dominate Catamarca Province.

El Ancasti became Catamarca's leading news daily, eclipsing La Unión, established in 1928. The newspaper would later maintain a conflicted relationship with Governor Arnoldo Castillo and his son and successor, Oscar Castillo, whose administrations initiated numerous lawsuits against the daily and withdrew advertising.
