= El Bañado =

El Bañado may refer to:

- El Bañado (Valle Viejo), a municipality in Catamarca Province in Argentina
- El Bañado (La Paz), a village and municipality in Catamarca Province in Argentina
- El Bañado (Capayán), a village and municipality in Catamarca Province in Argentina
