= Saujil =

- District head
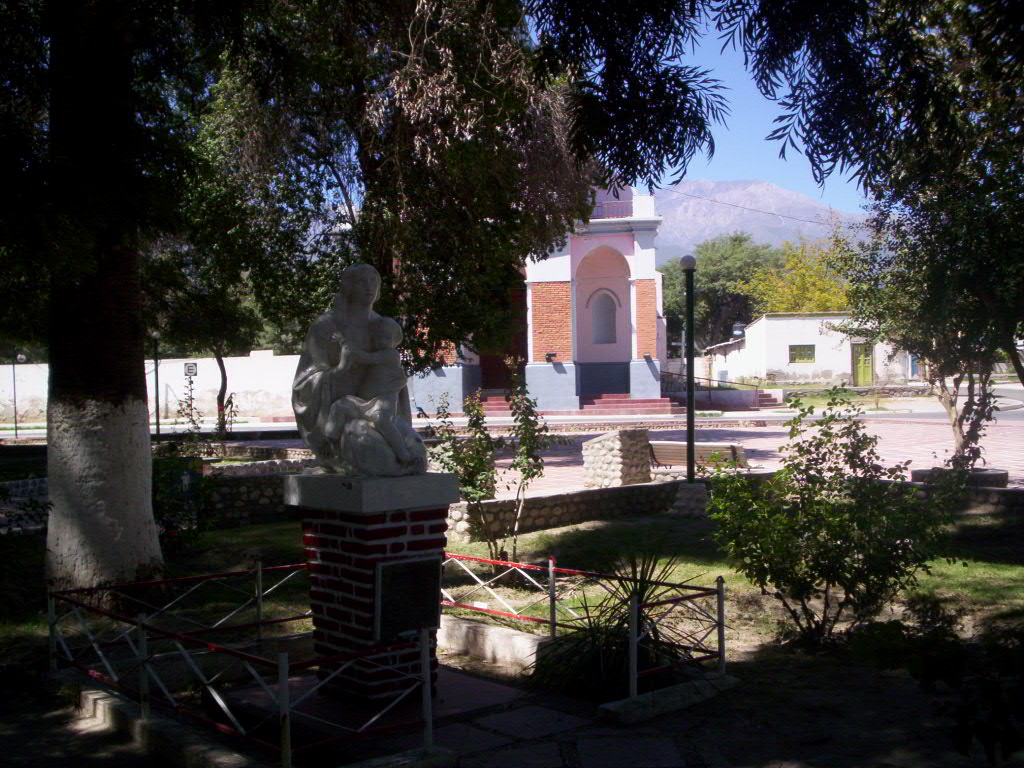
- Saujil's town square

- Location of Saujil in Argentina
- Coordinates: 28°10′S 66°12′W
- Country: Argentina
- Province: Catamarca
- Department: Pomán

Government
  - Mayor: Lucas Carrazana (Alianza)

Population
  - Total: 4,949 (2,001)
- Demonym: saujilista
- Time zone: UTC−3 (ART)
- CPA base: K5321
- Dialing code: +54 03835
- Website: MunicipioSaujil.com (Municipality's official website)

Saujil is the district head of the Pomán Department, of the west of the province of Catamarca (Argentina), that counts on about 5,000 hab., is made up of the following populations (north to south):

- Colpes
- San José de Colpes
- Joyango
- San Miguel
- Las Casitas
- Saujil
- El Potrero
- Rincón
- Michango
- Siján

== Toponymy ==
Its name means “Place of the light” in native language.
