= Pomán Department =

Pomán Departamento Pomán
- Department
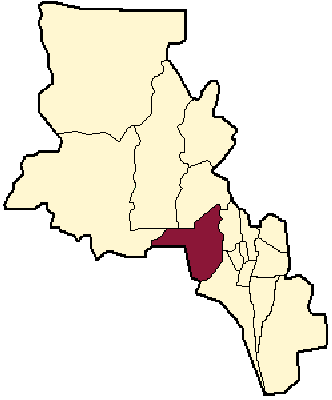
- location of Pomán Department in Catamarca Province
- Coordinates: 28°10′26″S 66°12′41″W
- Country: Argentina
- Established: ?
- Founder: ?
- Seat: Saujil

Government
  - Mayor: Francisco Antonio Gordillo, FJ

Area
  - Total: 4,859 km^{2} (1,876 sq mi)

Population (2001 census [INDEC])
  - Total: 9,543
  - Density: 1.964/km^{2} (5.087/sq mi)
- Demonym: pomanense
- Postal Code: K5321
- IFAM: CAT019
- Area Code: 03835
- Patron saint: ?
- Website: www.camsencat.gov.ar/poman.html

Pomán is a department of Catamarca Province in Argentina.

The provincial subdivision has a population of about 9,500 inhabitants in an area of 4,859 km^{2} (1,876 sq mi), and its capital city is Saujil, which is located around 158 km (98 mi) from the provincial capital.

== Settlements ==
=== Saujil ===
- Saujil
- Colpes
- San José
- Joyango
- San Miguel
- Las Casitas
- Rincón
- Michango
- Siján
- Villages of the field (Tucumanao, and others)

=== Mutquín ===
- Mutquín
- Apoyaco

=== Pomán ===
- Villa de Pomán
- Rosario de Colana
- Retiro de Colana
- El Pajonal
