= El Divisadero, Catamarca =

Coordinates: 29°13′S 65°27′W

El Divisadero
- Municipality and village
- Interactive map of El Divisadero
- Country: Argentina
- Province: Catamarca
- Department: La Paz
- Time zone: UTC−3 (ART)

El Divisadero is a village and municipality in Catamarca Province in northwestern Argentina.
