= Civic and Social Front of Catamarca =

Civic and Social Front of Catamarca Frente Cívico y Social de Catamarca
- Founder: Eduardo Brizuela del Moral
- Founded: 1991
- Headquarters: Catamarca, Argentina
- Ideology: Radicalism; Liberalism; Social democracy
- Political position: Centre-left
- National affiliation: Cambiemos
- Members: Radical Civic Union; Socialist Party; Republican Proposal; Civic Coalition ARI; Movilización; Nuevo Espacio de Opinión; Partido Fe
- Argentine Chamber of Deputies: 1 / 257
- Argentine Senate: 1 / 72
- Catamarca Chamber of Deputies: 18 / 41
- Catamarca Senate: 3 / 16

The Civic and Social Front of Catamarca (Spanish: Frente Cívico y Social de Catamarca) is a provincial political party in Argentina.

The front was formed in 1991 by the Catamarcan branch of the Radical Civic Union and minor local parties. Since then it has held the governor's house in Catamarca, first with Arnoldo Castillo (1991-1999), then with his son Oscar Castillo (1999-2003), and then with Eduardo Brizuela del Moral (2003-2011).
