= La Majada, Catamarca =

Coordinates: 29°03′S 65°33′W

La Majada (Catamarca)
- Municipality and village
- Interactive map of La Majada (Catamarca)
- Country: Argentina
- Province: Catamarca Province
- Department: Ancasti
- Time zone: UTC−3 (ART)

La Majada (Catamarca) is a village and municipality in Catamarca Province in northwestern Argentina.
