= Colana =

Coordinates: 28°22′S 66°10′W

- Municipality and village
- Interactive map of Colana
- Country: Argentina
- Province: Catamarca Province
- Department: Pomán
- Time zone: UTC−3 (ART)

Colana is a village and municipality within the Pomán Department of Catamarca Province in northwestern Argentina.
