= Monte Potrero =

Coordinates: 28°13′S 65°40′W

- Municipality and village
- Interactive map of Monte Potrero
- Country: Argentina
- Province: Catamarca Province
- Time zone: UTC−3 (ART)

Monte Potrero is a village and municipality in Catamarca Province in northwestern Argentina.

It is about 5 km away from La Merced.

The population was 196 as of the 2001 census in the area, an increase of 3.15% from the previous 190 inhabitants.
