= Colpes, Ambato =

Coordinates: 28°03′54″S 65°48′43″W

Colpes
- Municipality and village
- Interactive map of Colpes
- Country: Argentina
- Province: Catamarca Province
- Time zone: UTC−3 (ART)

Colpes is a village and municipality in Catamarca Province in northwestern Argentina, located in the Ambato Department.
