= El Quimilo =

Coordinates: 29.9019°S 65.3982°W

- Municipality and village
- Interactive map of El Quimilo
- Country: Argentina
- Province: Catamarca Province
- Department: La Paz
- Time zone: UTC−3 (ART)

El Quimilo is a village and municipality in Catamarca Province in northwestern Argentina.
