= Huaycama =

Huaycama may refer to:

- Huaycama, Ambato, Catamarca, Argentina
- Huaycama, Valle Viejo, Catamarca, Argentina
