= Las Palmitas =

Las Palmitas may refer to:

- Las Palmitas, Argentina
- Las Palmitas, Los Santos, Panama
- A neighbourhood in the city of Pachuca, Mexico

== See also ==
- Palmitas, Soriano Department, Uruguay
