= Huaycama, Ambato =

Huaycama (Ambato)
- Municipality and village
- Location of Huaycama within Argentina
- Coordinates: 28°04′26″S 65°48′40″W
- Country: Argentina
- Province: Catamarca
- Department: Ambato

Population (2010)
  - Total: 152
- Time zone: UTC−3 (ART)

Huaycama is a village and municipality within the Ambato Department of Catamarca Province, northwestern Argentina.
