= Choya =

Choya may refer to:

- Choya, Argentina, a village and municipality in Catamarca Province, Argentina
- Choya, Russia, a rural locality (a selo) in Choysky District of the Altai Republic, Russia
- Choya Umeshu Co., Ltd., a Japanese liqueur company
