= Choya, Argentina =

Choya
- Municipality and village
- 27°52′21″S 66°38′28″W
- Location within Argentina
- Coordinates: 27°52′21″S 66°38′28″W
- Country: Argentina
- Province: Catamarca Province
- Department: Andalgalá
- Elevation: 3,691 ft (1,125 m)

Population (2001)
  - Total: 403
- Time zone: UTC−3 (ART)
- Postal code: K4741
- Area code: 03835

Choya is a village and municipality in the Andalgalá Department of Catamarca Province in northwestern Argentina. The town is located on National Route 47. It is located along the Río Choya.

== History ==
Early mentions of Choya exist in colonial Spanish records. In 1660, Alonso Mercado y Villacorta used his position as Governor of Rio de la Plata to distributed management responsibilities regarding the native peoples in the Andalgalá valley to three trustees, including Gregorio de Villagra. Several families of native Ingamana people were installed in Choya in 1674.

Radiocarbon dating has taken place at Choya 68, a site in Choya that was excavated to extract remnants of Aguada Portezuelo ceramic artifacts, dating them to around 1000 AD.

Located south of the Capillitas mine, Choya was one of the localities of Catamarca subjected to intrusion by the MARA project, a brownfield mining initiative. Citizens protesting from Choya and surrounding areas were repressed and arrested by the government, who sought to increase economic activity in the area through resource extraction.

== Transportation ==
National Route 63 was established in the 20th century, connecting the town of Capillitas to the city of Andalgalá via 104 kilometres of unpaved road, with Choya as one of the primary stops on the highway. In 1980, National Decree 1595 of 1979 went into effect, renaming National Route 63 to National Route 47, the name by which it is now known.

== Ecology ==
From March 1990 to January 1991, a survey on genomic variation amongst gray leaf-eared mice collected specimens from the area in and around Choya.
