= Pajonal (disambiguation) =

Pajonal is a corregimiento in Penonomé District, Coclé Province, Panama.

It may also refer to:

== Places ==
- Cerro Pajonal, a mountain in the Andes Mountains of Argentina
- Gran Pajonal (Great Grassland or Great Savannah), an isolated interfluvial plateau in the Amazon Basin of Peru
- El Pajonal, a village and municipality in Catamarca Province in northwestern Argentina
- San Antonio Pajonal, a city and municipality in the Santa Ana department of El Salvador

== Others ==
- Pajonal Asheninka or Ashéninka language, a.k.a. Ashéninca, Ashéninga, the name that some varieties included in the Ashéninka-Asháninka dialect complex have traditionally received, which belongs to the Kampan branch of the Arawak family
