= Colpes, Pomán =

Coordinates: 28°06′S 66°13′W

Colpes
- Municipality and village
- Interactive map of Colpes
- Country: Argentina
- Province: Catamarca Province
- Time zone: UTC−3 (ART)

Colpes is a village and municipality in Catamarca Province in northwestern Argentina, located in the Pomán Department.
