= Cabrito Rock =

Argentine rock festival

- Genre: Rock, Heavy metal, Blues, Reggae
- Dates: January (2007) February (2008-present)
- Locations: Recreo, Argentina
- Years active: (2007–present)

Cabrito Rock is a Spanish rock festival, usually lasting about two days. Inspired by the Cosquin Rock festival, it takes place in Recreo, Argentina, and is the only festival of its kind in the Catamarca Province.

== History ==
The festival was first held on January 6, 2007, at "Club Union Sportiva" with an audience of over 1,000 people. The second festival was held in 2008 at "Club Atlético Pedro Cano", opening to a larger crowd than the first year.

In 2009, its third year, the crowd outgrew the organizers' expectations, with over 2,200 people in attendance. This time, images were broadcast on giant screensw located on the side of the stage. The fourth festival was held on February 6, 2010, with a night of tributes to great bands.

== Performers ==
1. January 6, 2007: Morfosis, La Maza, Papaya, Refuerzo, Adaggio, Radales
2. February 9, 2008: La Mula Vieja, Morfosis, La Maza, Aura
3. February 7, 2009: Juan Antonio Ferreyra "JAF", bands of Córdoba
4. February 6, 2010: Far West, Sujetos, Brote Meztizo, Lady Magnun, Deltabu, R.P. y Refuerzo
5. February 12, 2011: Emmanuel Horvilleur, Ciro Fogliata, Redo and local bands
