= Recreo =

- City
- Location in Argentina
- Coordinates: 29°16′S 65°04′W
- Country: Argentina
- Province: Catamarca
- Department: La Paz
- 1st level Municipality: Recreo
- Highest elevation: 270 m (890 ft)
- Lowest elevation: 220 m (720 ft)

Population (2010 census [INDEC])
  - Total: 11,847
- Time zone: UTC−3 (ART)
- CPA Base: K 5260
- Area code: +54 3832
- Website: www.recreociudad.gov.ar

Recreo is a city in Catamarca Province, Argentina. It is the head town of the La Paz Department. Recreo is also referred to the name of the Carts Recreo (Recreo de las Carretas in Spanish).

It is located about 8 km north of the Salinas Grandes is far to 206 km from the provincial capital San Fernando del Valle de Catamarca, 283 km from Cordoba 's capital, 980 km from Buenos Aires. Its population was 10,147 inhabitants in 2001 and according to projections INDEC 2007 amounted to 14,204 inhabitants in a rectangular area of 13.5 km² to 220 meters. Its inhabitants are called recreinos.

Was established in 1875 by the construction of a station of Ferrocarril General Manuel Belgrano in the field of seizing the then deputy provincial Pedro Cano. During the month of September 1958 according to Law No. 1755, is designated as head of the department of La Paz, the city Recreation and August 20, 1995 was issued Charter Municipal where Amusements is listed as local autonomous is now one of the cultural sites, industrial and economic important and influential in the province.

Although it has a short story while simultaneously is an economic hub and industrial and commercial, is also known nationally for having a visible legacy in history and folklore, and cultural attractions. As has hosted major events such as the Turismo Carretera.

== History ==
In pre-Columbian times until finally took place was the site of the nation's territory Juries, who left traces of their settlements as mortars made of stone in the hills of the city.

In the 1860s, Don Clemente Martinez takes possession of those lands, to die, his wife then married the provincial deputy Pedro Cano, who in 1874 lifted the stay "El Recreo" which had the main house, pools of water, windmill at the foot of the hills and his own family temple today San Roque Parish Recreation Montpellier. This place also used to be called "Recreation of the wagons" because in this place to park the carts used to rest a while and then continued his journey. On May 9, 1875, reaches the tip of the railroad track to the room being divided it into two. This event determined the population settlement in place, and that is why Leisure does not have a founder as the foundation and most other cities in the province that were founded after the fashion of European cities.

Later, land was expropriated from the stay so that people could live in the zone and when installed around the room were immediately evicted by the owner of the land, then led four other expropriations.

On March 24, 1892, there was an earthquake in the area, reaching a magnitude of 6.0 degrees on the Richter scale and an intensity of VII degree on the Mercalli scale, caused severe damage to the buildings of the city and there were some fatalities.

On 30 June 1962, was inaugurated Motegasta Dam about twenty kilometers from the town of ICAN, which will provide water to the inhabitants of the town of Recreo.

In 1982, he began promoting industry and in 1983 is inaugurated the zonal hospital Liborio Forte. Between 1986 and 1987, to reach the different factories that cause Recreation fastest growing demographic to date.

On 19 December 1986, is created by the Leisure shield Second Felindor seños Pineda. In 1992 he operated the municipality of Recreation.

In 2005, Recess has no available land belonging to the PE provincial or municipality to expand. And on 15 June 2007, the lord is created the official flag of the town of Recreo.

== Demographics ==
It has 10,147 inhabitants (INDEC, 2001), representing an increase of 49.46% compared with 6789 inhabitants (INDEC, 2001) the previous census and 50% of the population department.

Year	Population
1960	2.834
1970	2.806
1980	3.502
1991	6.789
2001	10.147
Est.2007	14.204

According to the projections for the 2007, it had 14,204 inhabitants, thus leaving the fifth most populous city in the province after San Fernando del Valle de Catamarca, Valle Viejo, Santa Maria, and Tinogasta. Although the increase in population began to decline since 2006.

== Economy ==
The city's economy is driven mainly by industries that export their products to other countries and the rest of the country, which are: food industries, Arcor, clothing, Fabrizzi; armed accumulator, Plaka, footwear, Willy; appliances, Barbero, textiles, Sabri and Tejica, minerals, ores of El Recreo. To a lesser extent the population is engaged in agriculture and raised cows and goats.

== Tourism ==
Tourism is not as great as in other cities of the province. The main destinations are "Christ the Redeemer" located in the hills, from which it has access to a great view of the city, festivals and events throughout the year, the main square, church, train station and the municipal campsite.

== Culture ==
A well-established custom in the city as in most of Argentina is an infusion of drinking mate very famous in this country as in certain sectors of Paraguay, Uruguay, Brazil, Chile and Bolivia are also infusions popular tea, mate tea, coffee, and coffee which are often accompanied by pastries called "recibos", rosquetes, tablets, cheese, etc.. As for the barbecue lunch and the kid are the traditional.

- Festival Nacional del Cabrito: annually in February in the second half takes place in a weekend Friday Saturday and Sunday, one of the largest festivals in the area. There were presented various artists such as: Soledad, Burnet, Chaco Palavecino, Abel Pintos.
- Cabrito Rock: began to be implemented first in 2007 and as a kid at the festival, with the same name and takes place in February. It is the only festival of its kind in the province and call for artists who sing and play rock music.
- May 9: Day of Leisure foundation: an annual basis to thousands of people attending hacércelo began in 2001. Is celebrated as the founding day of the arrival of the first locomotive in the community. It is celebrated with the presence of city officials and neighboring community schools, also with music, regional songs and a parade of students in all schools and the police force.
- Expo-Feria of the book: in June, organized by the Immaculate Conception Private College and sponsored by the City of Recreation. Along with the Expoventa of literature, develop conferences, reading workshops, art exhibitions by local artists, and so on.
- Chariots of spring: here the schools choose the queen of her institution, and then displayed on floats that pass through the streets.
- "Evita" Championships: students from different schools competing in various sports such as soccer, volleyball, handball and athletics, and subsequently participated in the departmental authorities where they compete with other schools in the department, then go to the provincial and finally to the national.

== Transportation ==
From the train station used to go Leisure trains carrying passengers during the last half of the 19th century and throughout the 20th century until 1977. Currently, they are only used for cargo transport, especially cereals. Today only the go bus terminal groups that target different parts of the country and also the Department. Like a few decades ago the planes could land at the municipal airfield located south of the city until later abandoned.

== Media ==
It has four FM radio stations. 93.5 FM The Voice, Radio Líder FM 103.3, FM 100.1, and FM Del Este 99.7 Municipal transmitting live music on internet from the municipality. The city has an "official website", two newspapers now publish on the Internet where information and news site. It also has a web site showing pictures and videos of social events offering more sociocultural, political, commercial and industrial city of Recreation.

Has long had a television but was later canceled.

== Religion ==
The city is home to people of different faiths and religions to be the largest Catholic. Of which there are two churches and two chapels. Evangelical Church also has several churches like the Church of Jehovah's Witnesses.

Apart sects are not so numerous as Mormons, atheists, agnostics, etc.

== Education ==
Leisure education system consists of the initial level 1st, 2nd and 3rd cycle of EGB: composed of five schools spread throughout the city. And two educational establishments Polimodal Level: College Polimodal No. 22 (ex-technical school) where he works at night Polimodal College Multipurpose No. 60 Art where you can learn pottery painting and carry musical instruments, and the Private School Immaculate Conception (CPIC )-first secondary school in eastern Catamarca, where it also operates a secondary school for adults to CENS No. 189, the building is the home of the Festival del Cabrito.

Tertiary (IES Recreation) operates during the night shift at the local School No. 280, School of Basic General Education. A school for disabled persons School No. 9 "Fray Mamerto Esquiu. A police school which children attend from three to thirteen. And the Public Library Estanislao Zeballos (named after the writer and politician Estanislao Zeballos) located opposite the main square.

The 29.00% of the population has completed primary school, the 53.27% have completed primary school but incomplete, 12.68% have finished high school but incomplete tertiary or university, and only 5.05% have tertiary or complete university.

== See also ==
- 1892 Recreo earthquake
- Open Air Museum Viña del Mar
