= Joyango =

Coordinates: 28.4476°S 65.7758°W

- Municipality and village
- Interactive map of Joyango
- Country: Argentina
- Province: Catamarca Province
- Department: Capital
- Time zone: UTC−3 (ART)

Joyango is a village and municipality in Catamarca Province in northwestern Argentina.
