= Gonzalo Villar =

Gonzalo Villar may refer to:

- Gonzalo Villar (poet) (born 1968), Chilean poet and lawyer
- Gonzalo Villar (footballer) (Gonzalo Villar del Fraile, born 1998), Spanish footballer
