= Colonia Nueva Coneta =

Coordinates: 28°34′04″S 65°50′18″W

- Municipality and village
- Interactive map of Colonia Nueva Coneta
- Country: Argentina
- Province: Catamarca Province
- Time zone: UTC−3 (ART)

Colonia Nueva Coneta is a village and municipality in Catamarca Province in northwestern Argentina.

== Location ==
It is located 12 km from the city of San Fernando del Valle de Catamarca, on the margin of the Ongolí River and at the foot of the southwestern slope of the Sierra de Ambato.

== Population ==
It has 1,951 inhabitants (INDEC, 2010), which represents an increase of 30% compared to 1,497 inhabitants in 2001.
