= Huaycama, Valle Viejo =

Huaycama
- Municipality and village
- Location of Huaycama within Argentina
- Coordinates: 28.5111°S 65.6692°W
- Country: Argentina
- Province: Catamarca
- Department: Valle Viejo
- Time zone: UTC−3 (ART)

Huaycama is a village and municipality within the Valle Viejo Department of Catamarca Province in northwestern Argentina.
