= Kuntur Wasi (disambiguation) =

Kuntur Wasi (Quechua for "condor house", Hispanicized spellings Condor Huasi, Cóndor Huasi, Condorhuasi) may refer to:

- Cóndor Huasi, a village and municipality in Argentina
- Kuntur Wasi, an archaeological site in the Cajamarca Region, Peru
- Kuntur Wasi (Ancash), a mountain in the Ancash Region, Peru
- Kuntur Wasi (Bolivia), a mountain in the Potosí Department, Bolivia
- Kuntur Wasi (Peru), a mountain in the Apurímac Region, Peru

== See also ==
- Kuntur Wayi (disambiguation)
