= Open Air Museum Viña del Mar =

- Museo al Aire Libre de Viña del Mar
- Established: 2011
- Location: Recreo, Viña del Mar, Chile
- Collection size: 22 images
- Website: https://murosquemiranelmar.blogspot.com/2012/02/la-historia-del-museo.html

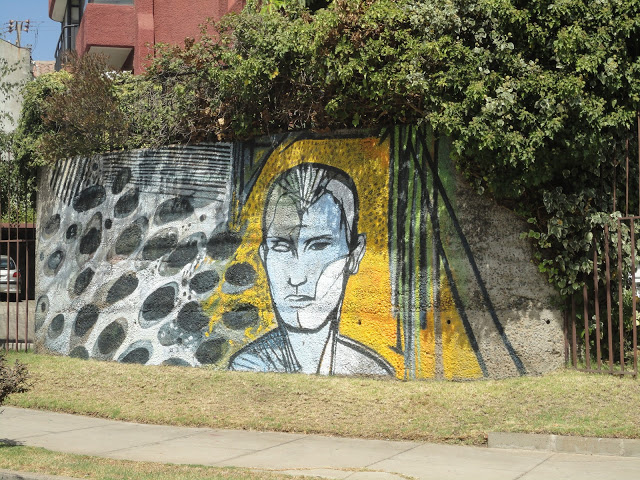
2011

Open Air Museum Viña del Mar (Spanish: Museo al Aire Libre de Viña del Mar) is an open-air art museum located near Recreo, Viña del Mar, Chile, near the city of Valparaíso.

The museum called, "Walls watching the sea", is focused on reproductions of Chilean Modern art executed by Claudio Francia Willms. Myriam Parra Vásquez is the curator of the museum.

The work has the support of the Regional Government of Valparaíso. It is a project of the Association of Neighborhood Councils of Recreo, administered by the non-profit organization Fundación Tempestad.

The museum is conceptually linked to the poems of Gonzalo Villar.
