= Festival Nacional del Cabrito =

Festival Nacional del Cabrito (National Kids Festival) is a three-day festival taking place annually in late February, in Recreo, Catamarca Province, Argentina. It one of the largest festivals in the area.

The festival started in 1972. The festival is home to a fair, many crafts, and the annual voting of queens.

== See also ==
- Recreo City
