= Capital Department, Catamarca =

Capital (San Fernando del Valle) Departmento Capital
- Department
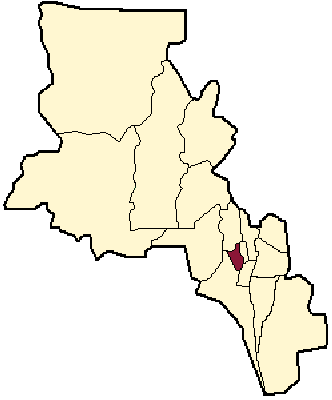
- location of Capital Department in Catamarca Province
- Coordinates: 28°28′S 65°47′W
- Country: Argentina
- Established: 1683 (city)
- Founder: ?
- Seat: San Fernando del Valle de Catamarca

Government
  - Mayor: Ricardo Gasper Guzmán, FCS

Area
  - Total: 684 km^{2} (264 sq mi)

Population (2010 census [INDEC])
  - Total: 159,703
  - Density: 233/km^{2} (605/sq mi)
- Demonym: catamarqueña/o
- Postal Code: K4700
- IFAM: CAT026
- Area Code: 03833
- Patron saint: ?
- Website: web.archive.org/web/20061214090310/http://www.camsencat.gov.ar/capital.html

Capital is a department of Catamarca Province in Argentina.

The provincial subdivision has a population of 159,703 inhabitants in an area of 684 km^{2} (264 sq mi), and its capital city is San Fernando del Valle de Catamarca, which is located around 1,145 km (711 mi) from Buenos Aires.

== Districts ==
- Bajo Hondo
- El Calvario
- El Carrizal
- El Pantanillo
- La Aguada
- La Calera
- La Sombrilla
- La Viñita
- Loma Cortada
- Pto. Fernández
- San Fernando del Valle de Catamarca
