= Villa Vil =

Coordinates: 27°06′S 66°49′W

- Municipality and village
- Interactive map of Villa Vil
- Country: Argentina
- Province: Catamarca Province
- Time zone: UTC−3 (ART)

Villa Vil is a village and municipality in Catamarca Province in northwestern Argentina.
