= Paclín Department =

Paclín Departamento Paclín
- Department
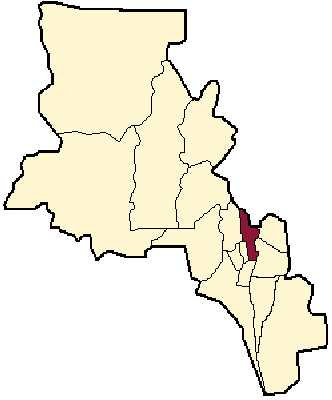
- location of Paclín Department in Catamarca Province
- Coordinates: 28°10′S 65°41′W
- Country: Argentina
- Established: ?
- Founder: ?
- Seat: La Merced

Government
  - Mayor: René Dante Noriega, FCS

Area
  - Total: 985 km^{2} (380 sq mi)

Population (2001 census [INDEC])
  - Total: 4,290
  - Density: 4.36/km^{2} (11.3/sq mi)
- Demonym: paclínense
- Postal Code: K4718
- IFAM: CAT018
- Area Code: 03833
- Patron saint: ?
- Website: www.camsencat.gov.ar/paclin.html

Paclín is a department of Catamarca Province in Argentina.

The provincial subdivision has a population of about 4,000 inhabitants in an area of 985 km^{2} (380 sq mi), and its capital city is La Merced, which is located around 60 km (37 mi) from the provincial capital.
