= Concepción, Catamarca =

Coordinates: 28°41′S 66°04′W

Concepción
- Municipality and village
- Interactive map of Concepción
- Country: Argentina
- Province: Catamarca Province
- Time zone: UTC−3 (ART)

Concepción is a village and municipality in Catamarca Province in northwestern Argentina.
