= Balde de la Punta =

Coordinates: 29°31′01″S 65°34′44″W

- Municipality and village
- Interactive map of Balde de la Punta
- Country: Argentina
- Province: Catamarca Province
- Time zone: UTC−3 (ART)

Balde de la Punta is a village and municipality in Catamarca Province in northwestern Argentina.
