= Mutquín =

Coordinates: 28°19′S 66°10′W

- Municipality and village
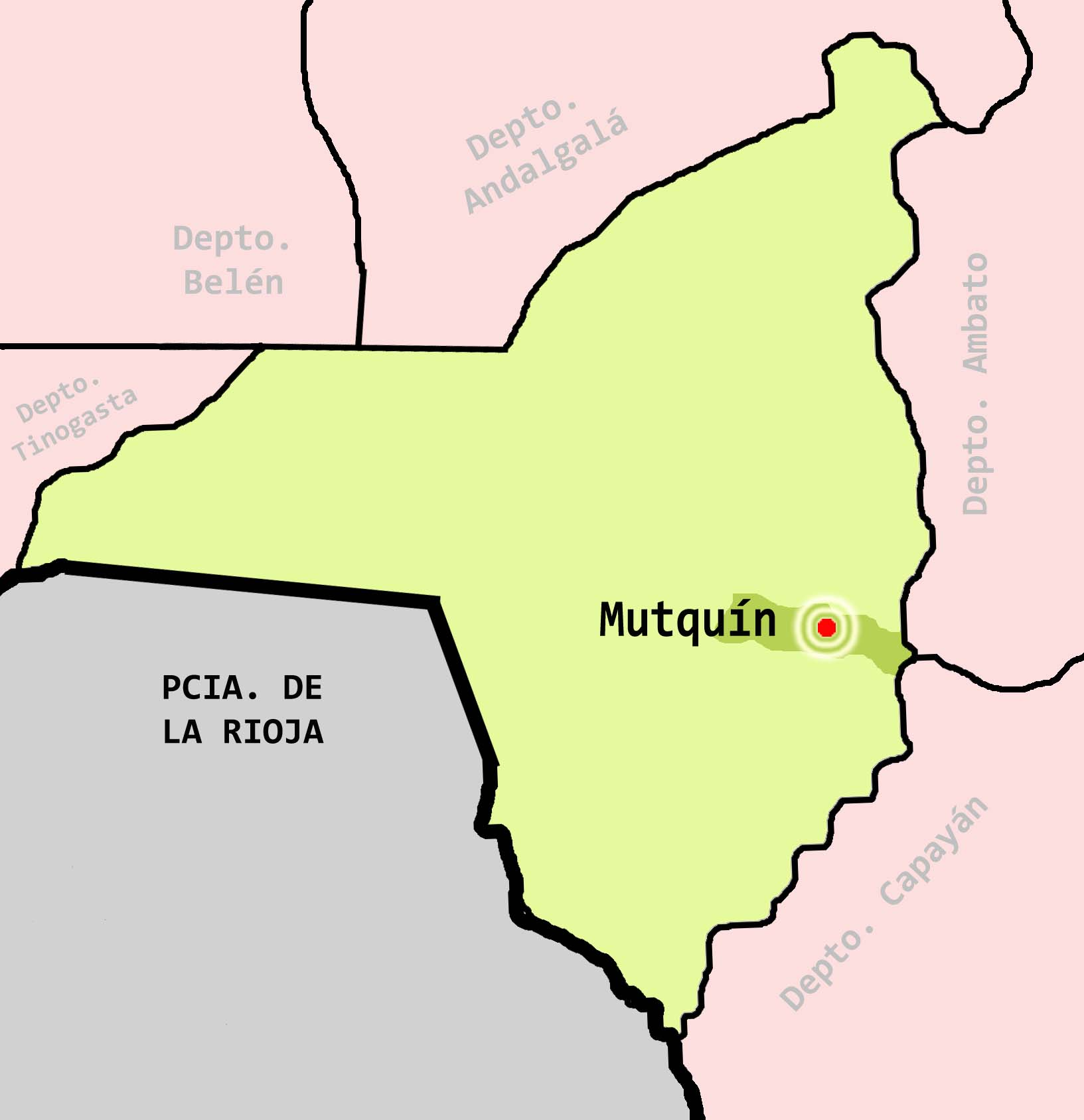
- Map indicating the location of Mutquín within the Catamarca Province in northwestern Argentina
- Interactive map of Mutquín
- Country: Argentina
- Province: Catamarca Province
- Time zone: UTC−3 (ART)

Mutquín is a village and municipality in Catamarca Province in northwestern Argentina.
