= Coneta =

Coordinates: 28°35′S 65°54′W

- Municipality and village
- Interactive map of Coneta
- Country: Argentina
- Province: Catamarca Province
- Time zone: UTC−3 (ART)

Coneta is a village and municipality in Catamarca Province in northwestern Argentina.
