= Adolfo E. Carranza =

Coordinates: 29°02′S 66°01′W

- Municipality and village
- Interactive map of Adolfo E. Carranza
- Country: Argentina
- Province: Catamarca Province
- Time zone: UTC−3 (ART)

Adolfo E. Carranza is a village and municipality in Catamarca Province in northwestern Argentina.
