= 1892 Recreo earthquake =

- Location within Argentina
- Local date: March 21, 1892
- Magnitude: 6.0 (est.)
- Depth: 30
- Epicenter: 29.5°S 65.0°W
- Areas affected: Argentina, Catamarca Province
- Max. intensity: MMI VII (Very strong)
- Casualties: some

The 1892 Recreo earthquake took place in the Catamarca Province of Argentina on 21 March at about 01:45 a.m., with magnitude of 6.0 on the Richter scale. Its epicenter was located approximately at 29°30′S 65°0′W, and at a depth of about 30 kilometres (19 mi).

The earthquake had a maximum felt intensity of VII on the Mercalli intensity scale. It caused some fatalities and serious structural damage in the town of Recreo.

== See also ==
- List of earthquakes in Argentina
- List of historical earthquakes
