= El Lindero =

Coordinates: 30.5000°S 64.5000°W

- Municipality and village
- Interactive map of El Lindero
- Country: Argentina
- Province: Catamarca Province
- Time zone: UTC−3 (ART)

El Lindero is a village and municipality in Catamarca Province in northwestern Argentina.
