= San Miguel, Catamarca =

Coordinates: 28°08′24″S 66°12′10″W

San Miguel (Catamarca)
- Municipality and village
- Interactive map of San Miguel (Catamarca)
- Country: Argentina
- Province: Catamarca Province
- Time zone: UTC−3 (ART)

San Miguel is a village and municipality in Catamarca Province in northwestern Argentina.
