= San Pedro, Capayán =

Coordinates: 28°44′S 66°07′W

San Pedro (Capayán)
- Municipality and village
- Interactive map of San Pedro (Capayán)
- Country: Argentina
- Province: Catamarca Province
- Time zone: UTC−3 (ART)

San Pedro (Capayán) is a village and municipality in Catamarca Province in northwestern Argentina.
