= Eduardo Brizuela del Moral =

Argentine politician (1944–2021)

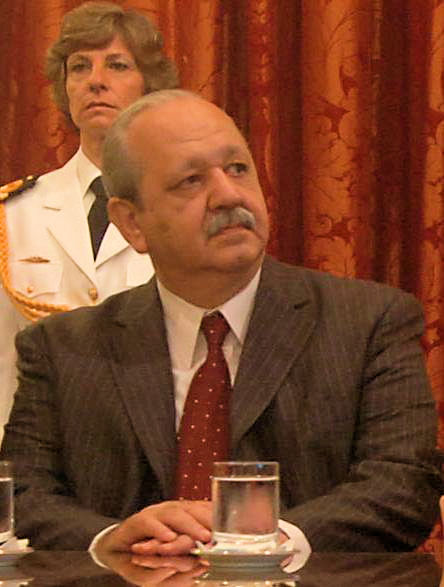

Governor of Catamarca
- In office 10 December 2003 – 9 December 2011
- Lieutenant: Hernán Colombo
- Preceded by: Oscar Castillo
- Succeeded by: Lucía Corpacci

National Senator
- In office 10 December 2001 – 10 December 2003
- Constituency: Catamarca

Mayor of San Fernando del Valle de Catamarca
- In office 10 December 1991 – 10 December 2001
- Preceded by: Juan Carlos Fussi
- Succeeded by: Humberto Rebellato

Personal details
- Born: Eduardo Segundo Brizuela del Moral; 20 August 1944 San Fernando del Valle de Catamarca, Argentina
- Died: 25 August 2021 (aged 77) San Fernando del Valle de Catamarca, Argentina
- Party: Radical Civic Union
- Other political affiliations: Civic and Social Front of Catamarca
- Profession: Agronomist

Eduardo Segundo Brizuela del Moral (20 August 1944 – 25 August 2021) was an Argentine Radical Civic Union (UCR) politician. He was governor of Catamarca Province from 2003 to 2011, heading the Civic and Social Front of Catamarca.

== Life ==
Eduardo Brizuela was born in San Fernando del Valle de Catamarca and studied agronomy at the Universidad Nacional de Córdoba, from which he graduated in 1972. He became an academic in the field of topography and was named a member of the Provincial Agronomists Council, later heading the Bureau of Surveyors of Catamarca Province and of its capital. In 1986 he became rector of the Universidad Nacional de Catamarca, serving until 1991.

=== Politics ===
Brizuela was elected Mayor of San Fernando del Valle de Catamarca in 1991. He was re-elected in 1995, and again in 1999. He served as vice-president of the Argentine Federation of Municipalities from 1998 to 2000. In 2001, he was elected to the Argentine Senate representing his home province, serving until the gubernatorial election in 2003.

Eduardo Brizuela became a "K Radical," a UCR supporter of President Néstor Kirchner, and endorsed Kirchner in the 2007 elections. He subsequently received the endorsement of Jorge Sobisch's conservative Movement of the United Provinces, in his own, successful re-election bid for governor. Following his re-election, Brizuela (and most K Radicals) broke with Kirchnerism as a result of the 2008 Argentine government conflict with the agricultural sector.

Brizuela ran for a third term as governor in the 2011 elections, being defeated by Senator Lucía Corpacci of the Kirchnerist Front for Victory by 83,711 votes over 76,627.

== Death ==
On 25 August 2021, he died at the age of 77 due to bilateral pneumonia and a stroke that had kept him hospitalized for several days in a San Fernando del Valle de Catamarca hospital.

Preceded by Óscar Castillo	Governor of Catamarca; 2003—2011	Succeeded by Lucía Corpacci
