= Alto de las Juntas =

Coordinates: 27°25′34″S 65°59′35″W

- Municipality and village
- Interactive map of Alto de las Juntas
- Country: Argentina
- Province: Catamarca Province
- Time zone: UTC−3 (ART)

Alto de las Juntas is a village and municipality in Catamarca Province in northwestern Argentina.
