= El Bañado, La Paz =

Coordinates: 29°12′S 65°27′W

El Bañado (La Paz)
- Municipality and village
- Interactive map of El Bañado (La Paz)
- Country: Argentina
- Province: Catamarca Province
- Time zone: UTC−3 (ART)

El Bañado (La Paz) is a village and municipality in Catamarca Province in northwestern Argentina.
