= Colonia del Valle, Catamarca =

Coordinates: 28°39′00″S 65°52′41″W

Colonia del Valle
- Municipality and village
- Interactive map of Colonia del Valle
- Country: Argentina
- Province: Catamarca Province
- Time zone: UTC−3 (ART)

Colonia del Valle is a village and municipality in Catamarca Province in northwestern Argentina.
