= Huillapima =

- Location in Argentina
- Coordinates: 28°43′S 65°58′W
- Country: Argentina
- Province: Catamarca
- Department: Capayán
- 2nd level Municipality: Huillapima
- Elevation: 451 m (1,480 ft)

Population (2001 census [INDEC])
  - Total: 2,139
- Time zone: UTC−3 (ART)
- CPA Base: K 4726
- Area code: +54 3833

Huillapima is a town and municipio in the Capayán Department of Catamarca Province, Argentina.
