= Kuntur Wayi (disambiguation) =

Kuntur Wayi or Kuntur Wayin (Quechua kuntur condor, Ancash Quechua wayi house, "condor house", -n a suffix, also spelled Condorhuayi; Condor Huayin, Cóndor Huain, Condor-Huain, Condorhuain, Cóndorhuain) may refer to:

- Kuntur Wayi or Kuntur Wayin, a mountain in the Bolognesi Province, Ancash Region, Peru
- Kuntur Wayin, a mountain in the Lima Region, Peru
- Kuntur Wayin (Junín), a mountain in the Junín Region, Peru
- Kuntur Wayin (Recuay), a mountain in the Recuay Province, Ancash Region, Peru

== See also ==
- Kuntur Wasi (disambiguation)
