= Oscar Castillo =

Argentine politician (born 1954)

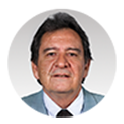

National Senator
- Incumbent
- Assumed office 10 December 2003
- Constituency: Catamarca

Governor of Catamarca
- In office 10 December 1999 – 10 December 2003
- Vice Governor: Hernán Colombo
- Preceded by: Arnaldo Castillo
- Succeeded by: Eduardo Brizuela del Moral

National Deputy
- In office 10 December 1989 – 10 December 1997
- Constituency: Catamarca

Provincial Deputy of Catamarca
- In office 10 December 1985 – 10 December 1989

Personal details
- Born: Oscar Anibal Castillo; 18 January 1954 (age 72) San Fernando del Valle de Catamarca, Argentina
- Party: Radical Civic Union

Oscar Aníbal Castillo (born 18 January 1954) is an Argentine Radical Civic Union (UCR) politician, currently a Senator for the Civic and Social Front of Catamarca and a former governor of that province. He is the son of the late Arnoldo Castillo, a leading figure in the Catamarca UCR.

== Biography ==
Castillo was born in San Fernando del Valle de Catamarca. He studied at the Universidad Nacional del Litoral becoming a lawyer. He was active in student politics, serving as secretary of his faculty's student union and representing his university at the Buenos Aires University Federation in 1980. He married the former Silvia Brocal, an accountant, and had two children.

Castillo has held high office in the UCR. He was President of the UCR youth wing in Catamarca Province (1981–83), and represented his province on the UCR national committee, in 1990-96 and 2001–04, and was vice-president and treasurer of the party.

Castillo served as a provincial deputy (legislator) in Catamarca (1985–89), and was UCR-MPC caucus leader. He was elected to the Argentine Chamber of Deputies in 1989 and reelected, serving until 1997. Castillo ran for and was elected governor of Catamarca in 1999, serving until 2003. His tenure was marked by debates regarding the separation of church and state. Castillo, who had taken his oath as a legislator without mentioning God in two previous occasions, imposed mandatory religious education of a Roman Catholic nature in Catamarca schools; protest from the province's sizable Jewish community and others led to the policy's rescission in 2001, however.

Catamarca voters returned him to the Senate upon completion of his term as governor. His reelection campaign, however, was followed by a challenge of the results amid accusations of vote buying and collusion with Governor Eduardo Brizuela del Moral to that effect; his personal estate, which includes at least a dozen properties in the province, has also come under scrutiny.
