= La Mesada, Catamarca =

Coordinates: 28°52′S 67°33′W

La Mesada
- Municipality and village
- Interactive map of La Mesada
- Country: Argentina
- Province: Catamarca Province
- Time zone: UTC−3 (ART)

La Mesada is a village and municipality in Catamarca Province in northwestern Argentina.
