= El Bañado, Valle Viejo =

Coordinates: 28.4661°S 65.7189°W

El Bañado (Valle Viejo)
- Municipality
- Interactive map of El Bañado (Valle Viejo)
- Country: Argentina
- Province: Catamarca Province
- Department: Greater San Fernando del Valle de Catamarca
- Time zone: UTC−3 (ART)

El Bañado (Valle Viejo) is a municipality in Catamarca Province in northwestern Argentina. It is located within the Greater San Fernando del Valle de Catamarca area.
