= Tucumanao =

Coordinates: 28°04′S 66°37′W

- Municipality and village
- Interactive map of Tucumanao
- Country: Argentina
- Province: Catamarca Province
- Time zone: UTC−3 (ART)

Tucumanao is a village and municipality in Catamarca Province in northwestern Argentina.
