= San Pablo, Catamarca =

Coordinates: 28°42′S 66°02′W

San Pablo
- Municipality and village
- Interactive map of San Pablo
- Country: Argentina
- Province: Catamarca
- Time zone: UTC−3 (ART)

San Pablo is a village and municipality in Catamarca Province in northwestern Argentina.
