= Capayán, Catamarca =

Coordinates: 28°46′S 66°04′W

Capayán
- Municipality and village
- Interactive map of Capayán
- Country: Argentina
- Province: Catamarca Province
- Time zone: UTC−3 (ART)

Capayán is a village and municipality in Catamarca Province in northwestern Argentina.
