= San Isidro, Catamarca =

San Isidro
- Location in Argentina
- Coordinates: 28°26′S 65°43′W
- Country: Argentina
- Province: Catamarca
- Department: Valle Viejo
- 2nd level Municipality: San Isidro, Catamarca
- Founded: 1698
- Elevation: 515 m (1,690 ft)

Population (2001 census [INDEC])
  - Total: 4,569
- Time zone: UTC−3 (ART)
- CPA Base: K 4707
- Area code: +54 3833

San Isidro is a town in Catamarca Province, Argentina. It is the head town of the Valle Viejo Department. It forms part of the Gran San Fernando del Valle de Catamarca urban agglomeration.
