= Chaquiago =

Coordinates: 27°32′S 66°21′W

- Municipality and village
- Interactive map of Chaquiago
- Country: Argentina
- Province: Catamarca Province
- Time zone: UTC−3 (ART)

Chaquiago is a village and municipality in Catamarca Province in northwestern Argentina.
