= Amanao =

Coordinates: 27°33′S 66°31′W

- Municipality and village
- Interactive map of Amanao
- Country: Argentina
- Province: Catamarca Province
- Time zone: UTC−3 (ART)

Amanao is a village and municipality in Catamarca Province in northwestern Argentina.
