= Buena Vista, Catamarca =

Coordinates: 30.5000°S 64.5000°W

Buena Vista
- Municipality and village
- Interactive map of Buena Vista
- Country: Argentina
- Province: Catamarca Province
- Time zone: UTC−3 (ART)

Buena Vista is a village and municipality in Catamarca Province in northwestern Argentina.
