= La Guardia, Catamarca =

Coordinates: 29°33′S 65°27′W

La Guardia
- Municipality and village
- Interactive map of La Guardia
- Country: Argentina
- Province: Catamarca Province
- Time zone: UTC−3 (ART)

La Guardia is a village and municipality in Catamarca Province in northwestern Argentina.
