= La Puerta, Argentina =

La Puerta
- Location in Argentina
- Coordinates: 28°10′S 65°47′W
- Country: Argentina
- Province: Catamarca
- Department: Ambato
- 3rd level Municipality: La Puerta
- Elevation: 752 m (2,467 ft)

Population (2001 census [INDEC])
  - Total: 752
- Time zone: UTC−3 (ART)
- CPA Base: K 4711
- Area code: +54 3833

La Puerta is a village in Catamarca Province, Argentina. It is the head of the Ambato Department.
