= Chumbicha =

Coordinates: 28°52′S 66°14′W

- Municipality and town
- Interactive map of Chumbicha
- Country: Argentina
- Province: Catamarca Province
- Time zone: UTC−3 (ART)

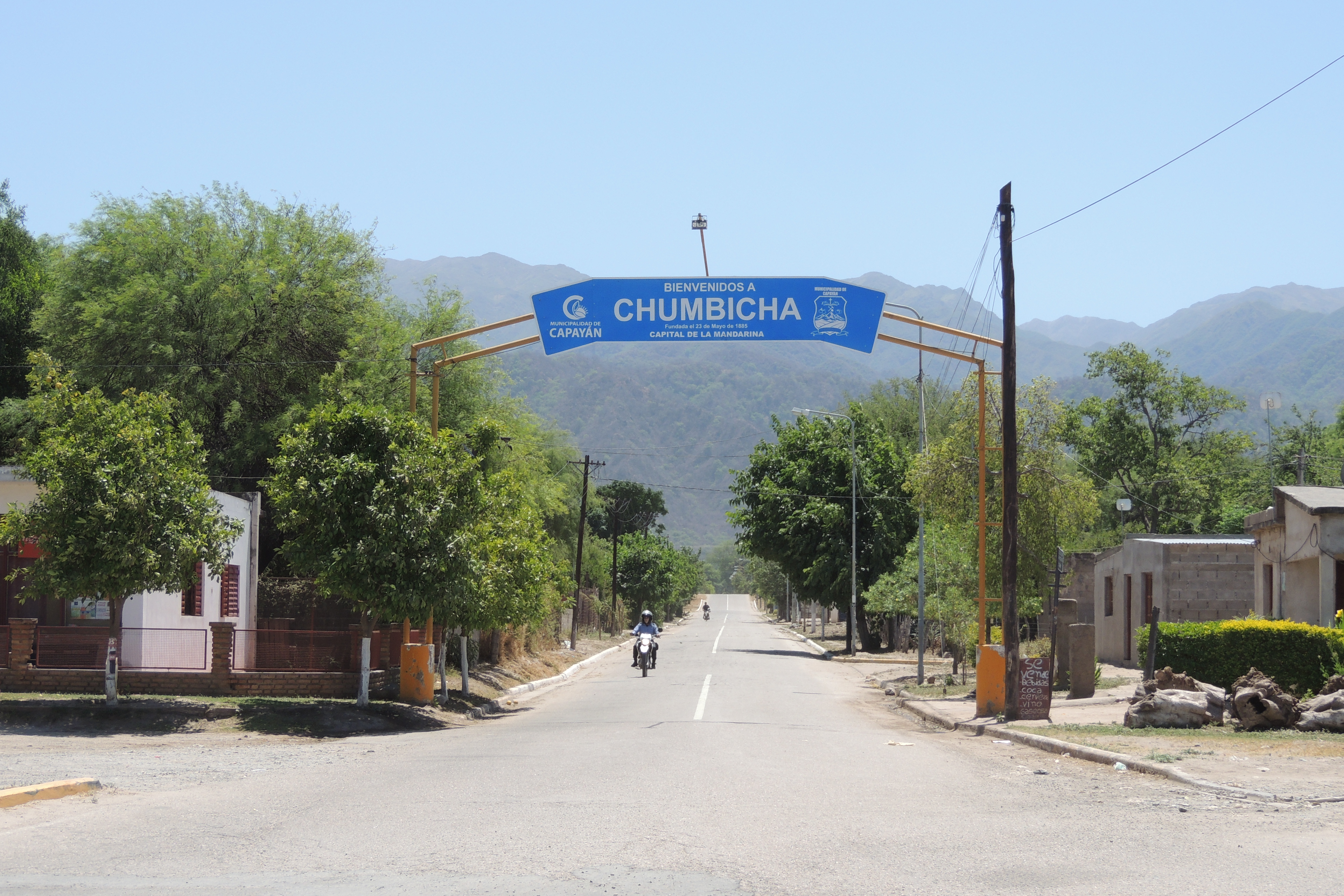
Entrance to Chumbicha

Chumbicha is a town and municipality in Catamarca Province in northwestern Argentina.
