= San Martín, Catamarca =

Coordinates: 29°14′S 65°46′W

San Martín (Catamarca)
- Municipality and village
- Interactive map of San Martín (Catamarca)
- Country: Argentina
- Province: Catamarca Province
- Time zone: UTC−3 (ART)

San Martín (Catamarca) is a village and municipality in Catamarca Province in northwestern Argentina.
