= Los Ángeles, Catamarca =

Coordinates: 28°29′S 65°59′W

Los Ángeles (Catamarca)
- Municipality and village
- Interactive map of Los Ángeles (Catamarca)
- Country: Argentina
- Province: Catamarca Province
- Time zone: UTC−3 (ART)

Los Ángeles (Catamarca) is a village and municipality in Catamarca Province in northwestern Argentina.
