= Salinas Grandes =

Salt pan in Argentina

Coordinates: 30°0′0″S 65°0′0″W

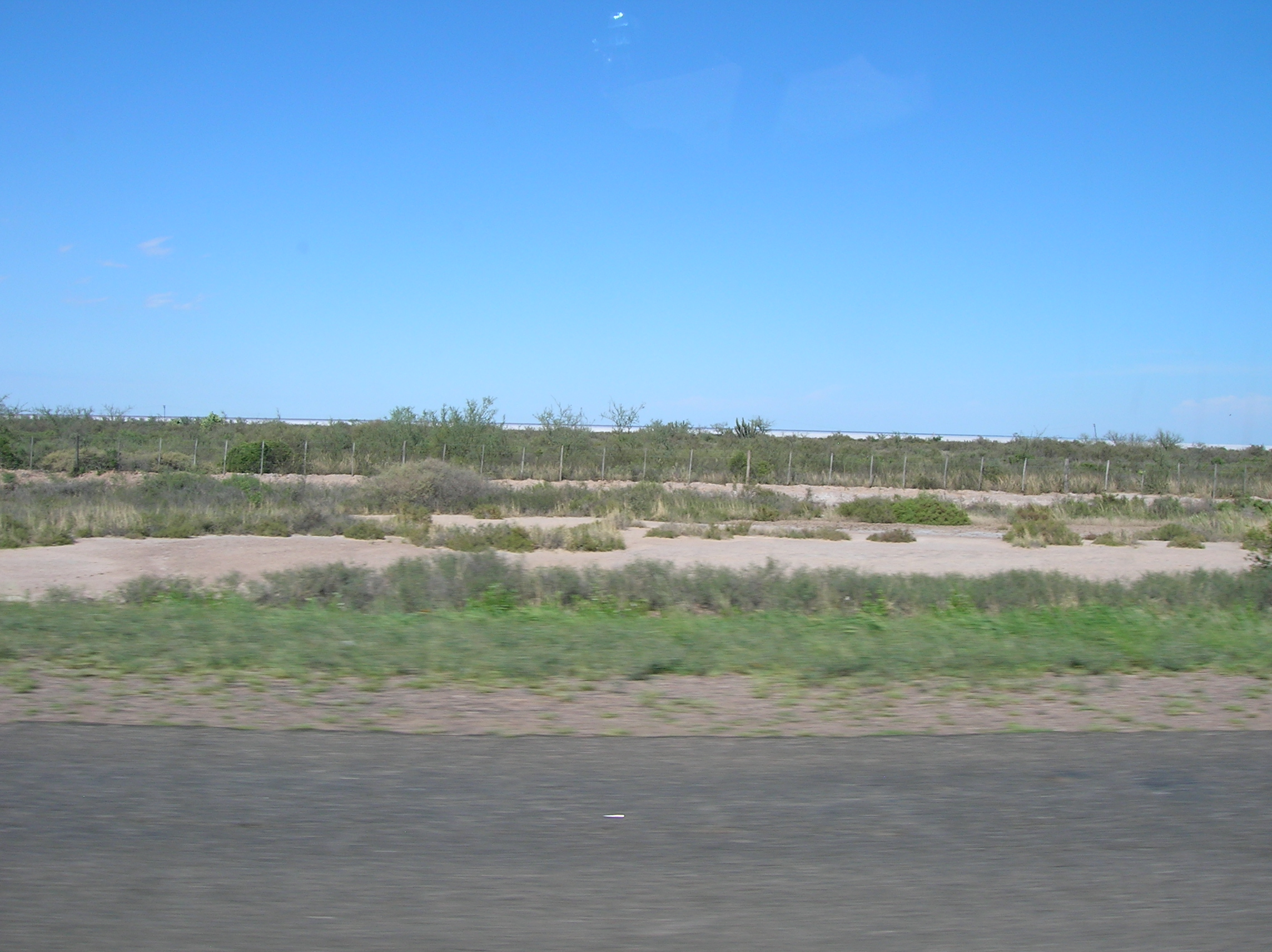
Salinas Grandes seen from the RN 60

The Salinas Grandes ('Salina' is a spanish word for salt flat) is a large salt flat in central-northern Argentina, spanning the borders of four provinces (Córdoba, Catamarca, La Rioja and Santiago del Estero), at an average altitude of 180 metres (590 ft) above sea level, and having an area of about 4,700 km^{2}.
