= La Merced, Catamarca =

Coordinates: 28.1660°S 65.6830°W

La Merced (Catamarca)
- Municipality and village
- Interactive map of La Merced (Catamarca)
- Country: Argentina
- Province: Catamarca Province
- Department: Paclín
- Time zone: UTC−3 (ART)

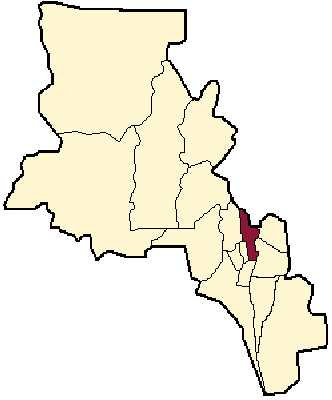
Catamarca - Argentina

La Merced (Catamarca) is a village and municipality in Catamarca Province in northwestern Argentina. It is the government seat of the Paclín Department.
