= El Bañado, Capayán =

Coordinates: 28°38′S 65°52′W

El Bañado (Capayán)
- Municipality and village
- Interactive map of El Bañado (Capayán)
- Country: Argentina
- Province: Catamarca Province
- Time zone: UTC−3 (ART)

El Bañado (Capayán) is a village and municipality in Catamarca Province in northwestern Argentina.

== GPS Coordinates ==
- DD Coordinates: -28.6333308 -65.8666632
- DMS Coordinates: -28°37'59.99" S -65°51'59.99" W
- Geohash Coordinates: 6dcjj5mqg820w
- UTM Coordinates: 20J 219743.85794039 6829275.5988872
