= Arnoldo Castillo =

Argentine politician (1922–2005)

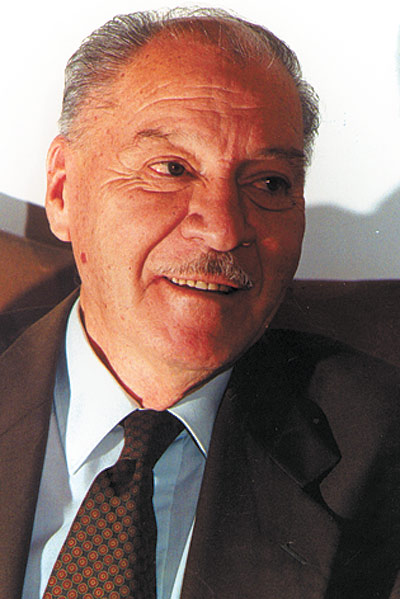
- Arnoldo Aníbal Castillo

Governor of Catamarca
- In office December 10, 1991 – December 10, 1999
- Lieutenant: Simón Hernández
- Preceded by: Luis Prol
- Succeeded by: Oscar Castillo

Governor of Catamarca
- In office March 3, 1981 – December 10, 1983
- Preceded by: Oscar Barcena
- Succeeded by: Ramón Saadi

Mayor of San Fernando del Valle de Catamarca
- In office May 19, 1976 – April 3, 1981
- Preceded by: Raúl Blas
- Succeeded by: Carlos Varela

Personal details
- Born: April 29, 1922 Quilmes, Buenos Aires Province, Argentina
- Died: September 29, 2005 (aged 83) Catamarca, Argentina
- Party: Radical Civic Union
- Profession: Engineer

Arnoldo Castillo (April 29, 1922 – September 29, 2005) was an Argentine politician.

== Life and times ==
Arnoldo Aníbal Castillo was born to Carmen Berrondo and Gualberto Castillo in Quilmes, a suburb of Buenos Aires, in 1922. His parents relocated to Catamarca, in the Argentine Northwest, early in his childhood. Castillo enrolled at the National University of Córdoba, where he studied mechanical engineering, and at the National University of San Juan, to study mining engineering. Unable to graduate, he was subsequently hired as a public administration clerk at Vialidad Nacional, the National Highway Bureau, and became a specialized advisor in the construction of mountain roads.

His experience took him to Bolivia in 1949, and helped plan that country's stretch of the Pan-American Highway. Returning to Catamarca, he worked as a consultant from 1950 to 1963, when he was elected to the Provincial Legislature on the centrist Radical Civic Union (UCR-P) ticket. Castillo was elected Mayor of Catamarca in 1966, in the first direct election for that post in the province's history; a coup d'état that June led to his removal by military authorities, however.

The same regime, represented in Catamarca by de facto Governor Horacio Pernasetti, appointed Castillo interim Mayor of Catamarca in 1971. A subsequent dictatorship again called on Castillo shortly after the March 1976 coup; Castillo resigned his membership in the UCR, and he served in the post until 1981. His membership in the UCR was reinstated after the return of democracy with elections in 1983.

The new governor, Ramón Saadi of the (Peronist) Justicialist Party, faced a crisis of his own when the rape and murder of a local teen, María Soledad Morales, in September 1990, was placed at the hands of two youths whose fathers were close to Governor Saadi. Saadi, an ally of President Carlos Menem, was replaced with a Federal Receivership by order of the President within days of the tragedy; ultimately, however, Catamarca voters turned against the ruling Justicialists, and Castillo was elected governor in elections in 1991.

Castillo's tenure was marked by an emphasis on infrastructure investments, notably road building and rural electrification. Two landmark projects include the Cuesta de El Portezuelo road and the San Francisco Pass, which improved links between both sides of the rugged Ancasti range, and facilitated commerce with neighboring Chile, respectively. The governor responded to the province's judicial bottlenecks by decreeing that, counter to the provincial constitution, candidates from anywhere in Argentina could be eligible for the bench in Catamarca. Castillo was challenged in his successful 1995 campaign for reelection by Ramón Saadi, who was defeated by 8%; the strength of the UCR in Catamarca led Castillo to forego joining the Alliance formed at the national level with the center-left Frepaso in 1997.

His tenure, in turn, was criticized for refusing to advertise in El Ancasti, Catamarca's most important news daily, as well as for its numerous lawsuits against the publication. Around 200 fraudulent pensions awarded during the Castillo tenure sent three of his officials to prison shortly after his retirement.

He was succeeded as governor by his son, Oscar, in 1999, and retired from public office; the UCR retained the governor's post in subsequent elections. Suffering from Type II diabetes, his health deteriorated in his later years. Arnoldo Castillo died in Catamarca in 2005, at age 83. A monument in his honor was unveiled in Catamarca in 2010.
