= La Aguada, Catamarca =

Coordinates: 27°31′S 66°18′W

La Aguada (Catamarca)
- Municipality and village
- Interactive map of La Aguada (Catamarca)
- Country: Argentina
- Province: Catamarca Province
- Time zone: UTC−3 (ART)

La Aguada (Catamarca) is a village and municipality in Catamarca Province in northwestern Argentina.
