= Ancasti =

- Location in Argentina
- Coordinates: 27°49′S 65°30′W
- Country: Argentina
- Province: Catamarca
- Department: Ancasti
- 2nd level Municipality: Ancasti
- Founded: September 26, 1735
- Elevation: 870 m (2,850 ft)

Population (2001 census [INDEC])
  - Total: 305
- CPA Base: K 4701
- Area code: +54 3833

Ancasti or Villa Ancasti is a town in Catamarca Province, Argentina. It is the head town of the Ancasti Department. It was founded in 1735, by Don Pedro Pablo Acosta. The festival of the patron saint is celebrated annually on Christmas Eve, December 24.

== Economy ==
The main trades in the local economy are agriculture and cattle farming. The biggest produce are maize, potato and squash.
