= Cóndor Huasi =

Cóndor Huasi Kuntur Wasi
- Municipality and village
- Interactive map of Cóndor Huasi
- Coordinates: 27°28′59″S 67°04′59″W
- Country: Argentina
- Province: Catamarca Province
- Elevation: 6,112 ft (1,863 m)
- Time zone: UTC−3 (ART)
- Postal code: K4751
- Area code: 03835

Cóndor Huasi (from Quechua Kuntur Wasi, kuntur condor, wasi house, "condor house") is a village and municipality in Catamarca Province in northwestern Argentina.
