= Las Palmitas, Argentina =

Las Palmitas
- Municipality and village
- Interactive map of Las Palmitas
- Coordinates: 28°56′S 65°06′W
- Country: Argentina
- Province: Catamarca Province
- Time zone: UTC−3 (ART)

Las Palmitas is a village and municipality in Catamarca Province in northwestern Argentina.
