= Andalgalá =

Ciudad de Andalgalá
- City
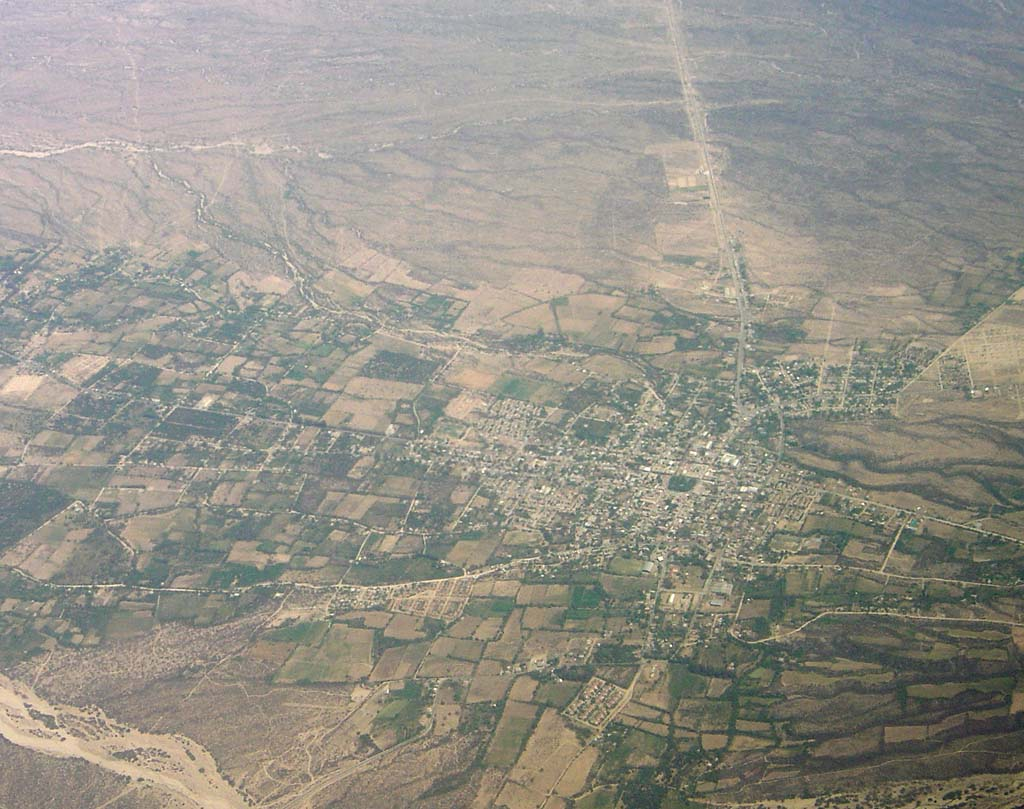
- Aerial view

- Location of Andalgalá in Argentina
- Coordinates: 27°36′S 66°19′W
- Country: Argentina
- Province: Catamarca
- Department: Andalgalá
- Elevation: 960 m (3,150 ft)

Population (2001 census)
  - Total: 14,068
- Time zone: UTC−3 (ART)
- CPA base: K4740
- Dialing code: +54 3835

Andalgalá is a city in the west-center of the province of Catamarca, Argentina, located in a valley near the Sierra de Aconquija, 260 km from the provincial capital San Fernando del Valle de Catamarca. It has about 14,000 inhabitants as per the 2001 census [INDEC]. It is the head town of the department of the same name. The Andalgalá River, which flows nearby, supports a hydroelectric power plant.

Andalgalá was founded as a fort on 12 July 1658, and only became a city in 1952. Its name is of Quechua origin and means either "Lord of the Hare" or "Lord of the High Mountain".

== Climate ==
According to the Köppen Climate Classification system, Andalgalá has a hot arid climate, abbreviated BWh on climate maps, although it is only 0.3 °C or 0.5 °F hotter than the threshold that would categorize it as a cool arid climate, and only a little too dry to qualify as a semi-arid climate. Precipitation is mainly concentrated from November to March with 80% of the annual precipitation occurring in these months.

Climate data for Andalgalá (1901–1960)
Month	Jan	Feb	Mar	Apr	May	Jun	Jul	Aug	Sep	Oct	Nov	Dec	Year
Record high °C (°F)	43.4 (110.1)	43.1 (109.6)	39.9 (103.8)	38.7 (101.7)	36.3 (97.3)	35.3 (95.5)	37.2 (99.0)	39.3 (102.7)	39.9 (103.8)	42.2 (108.0)	41.9 (107.4)	43.3 (109.9)	43.4 (110.1)
Mean daily maximum °C (°F)	33.7 (92.7)	32.3 (90.1)	30.1 (86.2)	26.2 (79.2)	21.7 (71.1)	18.3 (64.9)	18.7 (65.7)	21.5 (70.7)	25.5 (77.9)	28.9 (84.0)	31.9 (89.4)	33.7 (92.7)	26.9 (80.4)
Daily mean °C (°F)	25.1 (77.2)	24.0 (75.2)	21.9 (71.4)	17.9 (64.2)	13.7 (56.7)	9.9 (49.8)	10.0 (50.0)	12.7 (54.9)	16.7 (62.1)	20.1 (68.2)	22.9 (73.2)	25.0 (77.0)	18.3 (64.9)
Mean daily minimum °C (°F)	18.4 (65.1)	17.7 (63.9)	15.7 (60.3)	11.3 (52.3)	7.2 (45.0)	3.7 (38.7)	3.3 (37.9)	5.2 (41.4)	8.9 (48.0)	12.3 (54.1)	15.4 (59.7)	17.4 (63.3)	11.4 (52.5)
Record low °C (°F)	8.7 (47.7)	9.1 (48.4)	4.8 (40.6)	−1.8 (28.8)	−3.1 (26.4)	−4.7 (23.5)	−6.2 (20.8)	−5.7 (21.7)	−2.5 (27.5)	1.7 (35.1)	2.1 (35.8)	4.9 (40.8)	−6.2 (20.8)
Average precipitation mm (inches)	75.5 (2.97)	64.8 (2.55)	45.7 (1.80)	15.8 (0.62)	8.4 (0.33)	4.4 (0.17)	5.4 (0.21)	5.2 (0.20)	4.8 (0.19)	13.7 (0.54)	18.7 (0.74)	35.3 (1.39)	297.5 (11.71)
Average relative humidity (%)	53.0	60.2	62.8	64.2	64.3	63.5	55.2	48.2	46.7	50.0	50.2	51.7	55.8
Mean monthly sunshine hours	291	234	248	223	230	176	205	223	254	275	273	264	2,897
Percentage possible sunshine	69	64	65	65	69	56	62	64	70	70	67	62	65
Source 1: Secretaria de Mineria
Source 2: FAO (sun only)
