= Siján =

Coordinates: 28°16′S 66°14′W

- Municipality and village
- Interactive map of Siján
- Country: Argentina
- Province: Catamarca Province
- Time zone: UTC−3 (ART)

Siján is a village and municipality in Catamarca Province in northwestern Argentina.
