= Valle Viejo Department =

Valle Viejo Departamento Valle Viejo
- Department
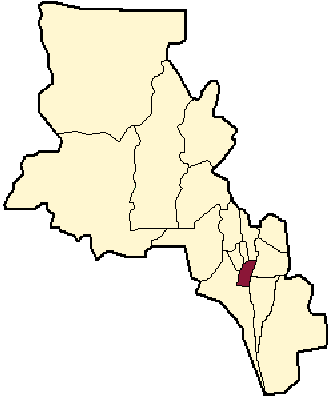
- location of Valle Viejo Department in Catamarca Province
- Coordinates: 28°27′28.2″S 65°43′30″W
- Country: Argentina
- Established: ?
- Founder: ?
- Seat: San Isidro

Government
  - Mayor: Gustavo Roque Jalile, UCR

Area
  - Total: 540 km^{2} (210 sq mi)

Population (2001 census [INDEC])
  - Total: 23,707
  - Density: 44/km^{2} (110/sq mi)
- Demonym: sanisidrense
- Postal Code: K4707
- IFAM: CAT033
- Area Code: 03833
- Patron saint: ?
- Website: www.camsencat.gov.ar/vviejo.html

Valle Viejo is a central department of Catamarca Province in Argentina.

The provincial subdivision has a population of about 24,000 inhabitants in an area of 540 km^{2} (210 sq mi), and its capital city is San Isidro.

== Prehistory ==
The Valle Viejo region has been populated for at least 8,000 years. Around 1,000 years ago the area was settled by a population of farmers and hunters. The population created buildings, irrigation systems, and various fortifications.
