= El Pantanillo =

Coordinates: 32°20′S 65°55′W

- Municipality and village
- Interactive map of El Pantanillo
- Country: Argentina
- Province: San Luis Province
- Time zone: UTC−3 (ART)

El Pantanillo is a village and municipality in San Luis Province in western Argentina.
