= El Potrero, Catamarca =

Coordinates: 27°30′32″S 66°19′41″W

El Potrero (Catamarca)
- Municipality and village
- Interactive map of El Potrero (Catamarca)
- Country: Argentina
- Province: Catamarca Province
- Time zone: UTC−3 (ART)

El Potrero (Catamarca) is a village and municipality in Catamarca Province in northwestern Argentina.
