= Ancasti Department =

Ancasti Departamento Ancasti
- Department
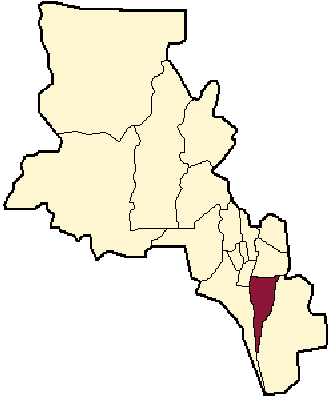
- location of Ancasti Department in Catamarca Province
- Coordinates: 28°48′45″S 65°30′03″W
- Country: Argentina
- Established: ?
- Founder: ?
- Seat: Ancasti

Government
  - Mayor: Blanca Azucena Reina, FCS

Area
  - Total: 2,413 km^{2} (932 sq mi)

Population (2001 census [INDEC])
  - Total: 3,082
  - Density: 1.277/km^{2} (3.308/sq mi)
- Demonym: ancastiense
- Postal Code: K4701
- IFAM: CAT002
- Area Code: 03832
- Patron saint: ?
- Website: web.archive.org/web/20061006062230/http://www.camsencat.gov.ar/ancasti.html

Ancasti is a department located in the southern part of Catamarca Province in Argentina.

The provincial subdivision has a population of 3,302 inhabitants (2022) in an area of 2,413 km^{2} (932 sq mi), and its capital city is Ancasti, which is located around 1,070 km (660 mi) from the Capital federal.
