= Gonzalo Villar (poet) =

Chilean poet and lawyer (born 1968)

Gonzalo Villar Bordones
- Born: 1968 (age 57–58); Viña del Mar, Chile
- Occupations: Poet, lawyer
- Known for: Lyric poetry and urban artistic interventions
- Notable work: Light (1993); Light Azzul (1994); Fugitive from a Blue Rain (2001); The Last Leaves of the Century (1999); New Poems of Love (2012)

Gonzalo Villar Bordones (born 1968 in Viña del Mar, Chile) is a Chilean poet and lawyer who often ventures into urban interventions.

== Works ==
In the field of lyric poetry, Villar published "Light" (1993), "Light Azzul" (1994), and "Fugitive from a Blue Rain" (2001). He has produced works on paper, DVD and art installations. Other works include "New Poems of Love" (2012) and "Walls Watching the Sea". "Light Azzul" was published with funding from the tate of Chile, through Fondart.

Villar is the author of "The Last Leaves of the Century" (1999), bookwork involved the calendar recording the history of mankind through poetry and quotes, and "Landmarks" text on the principles of Freemasonry, published in 2010 by Editorial Altazor. He created the blog "Crecer sin Dios" in 2005. Since late 2009, he has published a daily poetic text on his blog. His poetry inspired by the Open Air Museum Viña del Mar work done in conjunction with Myriam Parra, Claudio Francia, the Neighborhood Council of Recreo, and the Government of Valparaiso.

== Assessment of his work ==
Juan Cameron finds láricos elements in his poetry, standing as the highest point of his work, and his ability to relate to the human body as the highest embodiment of freedom. Cameron stresses, in turn, the occupation of clear topics of contemporary poetry, as in the case of a chaotic gathering, describing the woman through a series of adjectives and synecdoche: Industrious / multiple / labyrinth /distinguished (...) cachurera, Captain Araya, / new women friendsand unholy, / bossy with sympathy, and so on.

Alejandro Lavquén highlights the images that travel in the poems, the special eroticism of his work and the multiplicity of the issues they address.

Antón Castro notes his work of publishing a new poem every day.

The American academic Sonia Tejada, analyzing "Walls Watching the Sea," states the author seeks to build bridges between poetry, painting and everyday life. He emphasizes the use of water as a symbol of writing and life throughout his poems. The poet says the physical and symbolic process water, become a kind of aesthetic fertilization, in which the walls are acquitted of inertia. Art transforms the walls to capture the soul of these images. In this way, the spirit triumphs over the material in establishing a dialogue with the works of other artists.
