= La Paz Department, Catamarca =

La Paz Departamento La Paz
- Department
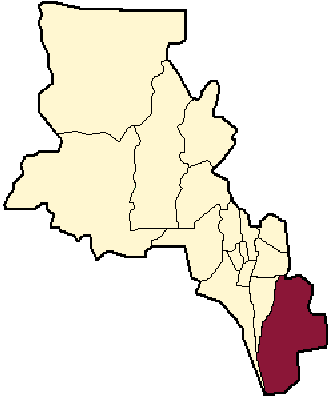
- location of La Paz Department in Catamarca Province
- Coordinates: 29°16′S 65°02′W
- Country: Argentina
- Established: 1875
- Founder: Octaviano Navarro
- Seat: Recreo

Government
  - Mayor: Ángel Faustino Lazarte, FCS

Area
  - Total: 8,149 km^{2} (3,146 sq mi)

Population (2001 census [INDEC])
  - Total: 21,061
  - Density: 2.584/km^{2} (6.694/sq mi)
- Demonym: lapacense
- Postal Code: K5260
- IFAM: CAT023
- Area Code: 03832
- Website: web.archive.org/web/20061219231538/http://www.camsencat.gov.ar/lapaz.html

La Paz is a department located in the south of Catamarca Province in Argentina.

The provincial subdivision has a population of about 21,061 inhabitants in an area of 8,149 km^{2} (3,146 sq mi), and its capital city is Recreo, which is located around 980 km (610 mi) from the Capital federal.
