= Ambato Department =

Ambato Departamento Ambato
- Department
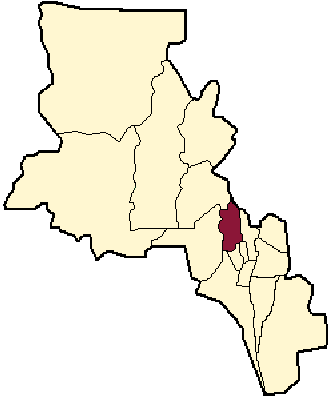
- location of Ambato Department in Catamarca Province
- Coordinates: 28°10′14″S 65°47′29″W
- Country: Argentina
- Established: ?
- Founder: ?
- Seat: La Puerta

Government
  - Mayor: Melchor Morra, Frente Justicialista

Area
  - Total: 1,797 km^{2} (694 sq mi)

Population (2001 census [INDEC])
  - Total: 4,525
  - Density: 2.518/km^{2} (6.522/sq mi)
- Demonym: ambateño
- Postal Code: K4711
- IFAM: CAT014
- Area Code: 03833
- Patron saint: ?
- Website: web.archive.org/web/20061210235116/http://www.camsencat.gov.ar/ambato.html

Ambato is a department in the province of Catamarca in the northwest of Argentina. It covers an area of 1761 km^{2} and features a mountainous terrain throughout. Administratively, it is divided into 7 districts: El Rodeo, Las Juntas, La Puerta, Los Varela, El Bolsón, Singuil, and Los Castillos.

== Toponymy ==
According to some authors, its name comes from the Kakán expression An-Huatu, which means "high sorcerer," and is related to the highest hill in the area, the Manchao hill. Other versions suggest that it comes from the Quechua word Hamppatu or Ampatu, which means "Toad Hill".

== Relief and Climate ==
The department entirely features mountainous relief, typical of the Sierras Pampeanas region. The highest point is the Manchao hill (4500 m above sea level). Within Ambato is the source of the Valle river and most of its basin, formed by various rivers and streams.

Ambato falls within the arid climate region of mountains and basins, but the numerous watercourses create a more humid microclimate, with average annual precipitation of 350 mm, primarily during the summer months. These conditions favor the development of abundant mountain vegetation.

== Population ==
It has a population of 4463 inhabitants (INDEC, 2010), representing a decrease of 1.4% from the 4525 inhabitants (INDEC, 2001) recorded in the previous census.

== Seismic Activity ==
The seismic activity in the Catamarca region is frequent and of low intensity, with a seismic silence of medium to severe earthquakes every 30 years in random areas. The last occurrences were:

- September 22, 1908 (115 years ago), at 17:00 UTC−3, with a magnitude of 6.5 on the Richter scale, Mercalli intensity VII; location 30°30′0″S 64°30′0″W; depth: 100 km; it caused damage in the province of Córdoba, and in the southern provinces of Santiago del Estero, La Rioja, and Catamarca.
- November 3, 1973 (50 years ago), at 14:17 UTC−3 with a magnitude of 5.8 on the Richter scale: in addition to the physical severity of the phenomenon, there was a complete lack of awareness among the population about these recurring events.
- September 7, 2004 (19 years ago), at 8:53 UTC−3, with an approximate magnitude of 6.5 on the Richter scale (2004 Catamarca earthquake).
