= San Fernando del Valle de Catamarca =

- City
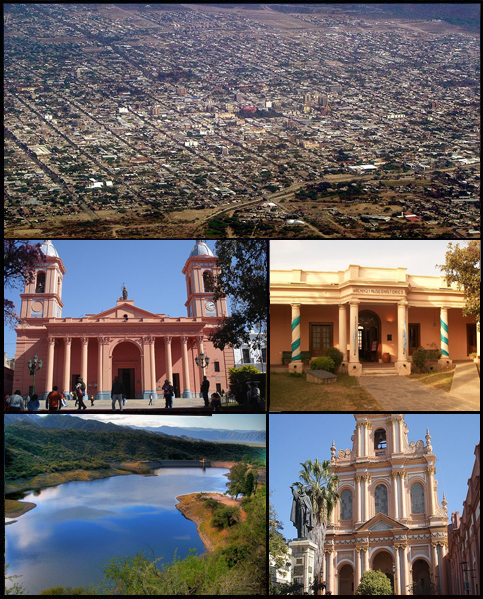
- (From top to bottom; from left to right) Aerial view of the city; Our Lady of the Valley of Catamarca Cathedral; San Fernando del Valle de Catamarca Historical Museum; El Jumeal reservoir and the San Francisco Church.

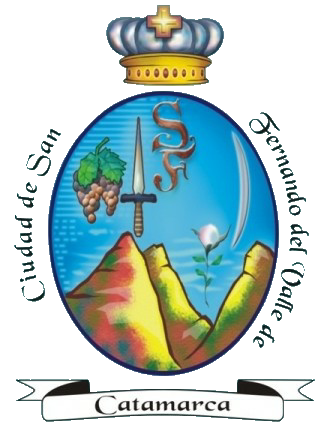
- Flag Coat of arms

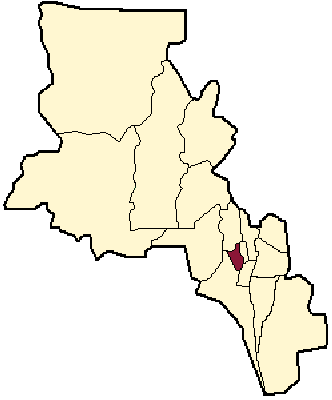
- Capital department within Catamarca Province

- Location of San Fernando del Valle de Catamarca in Argentina
- Coordinates: 28°28′S 65°47′W
- Country: Argentina
- Province: Catamarca
- Department: Capital

Government
  - Intendant: Gustavo Saadi (Justicialist Party)
- Elevation: 500 m (1,600 ft)

Population (2010)
  - Total: 159,139
- Demonym: catamarqueño
- Time zone: UTC−3 (ART)
- CPA base: K4700
- Dialing code: +54 383

San Fernando del Valle de Catamarca (Latin American Spanish: [saɱ feɾˈnando ðel ˈβaʝe ðe kataˈmaɾka]) is the capital and largest city in Catamarca Province in northwestern Argentina, on the Río Valle River, at the feet of the Cerro Ambato. The city name is normally shortened as Catamarca and is also known as Ciudad de Catamarca.

The city of 684 km^{2} (264 sq mi), located 500 m (1,640 ft) above sea level, has 159,000 inhabitants (2010 census [INDEC]), with more than 200,000 counting the suburbia, which represents around 70% of the population of the province.

== Overview ==
The city is located 1,130 km (702 mi) from Buenos Aires. The closest provincial capitals are La Rioja (154 km (96 mi)), Tucumán (230 km (143 mi)) and Santiago del Estero (209 km (130 mi)).

Many pilgrims come to San Fernando del Valle de Catamarca to visit the Church of the Virgin of the Valley (1694), which contains a statue of Nuestra Señora del Valle (Our Lady of the Valley).

Catamarca is also the touristic centre of the province, with its colonial architecture, and serves as a hub to many touristic points and excursions, hiking, mountain-bike tours, horse riding, and wine tasting.

== Transportation ==
San Fernando del Valle is served by Coronel Felipe Varela International Airport (CTC/SANC), with flights to Buenos Aires-AEP.

== History and politics ==
An initial settlement, called Londres, was established here by Spanish colonists in 1558; a permanent settlement was not founded until 1683, by Fernando de Mendoza y Mate de Luna. Catamarca comes from Quechua, meaning "fortress on the slope."

The city, which had only 8,000 inhabitants in 1882 and was reached by a railway line in 1888, grew very slowly, and the region remained poor even in the middle of the 20th century.

== Climate ==
The warm semi-arid climate (Köppen BSh) of Catamarca has an annual average of 20 °C with an average maximum temperature of 34 °C (93 °F) in summer with several days typically exceeding 43 °C (109 °F), and an average minimum of 5 °C (41 °F) in winter. Temperatures in the high mountains can drop down to −30 °C (−22 °F), however in the city they rarely go below freezing. The Valle (valley) receives relatively little rainfall from summer thunderstorms; most of the precipitation is received in the form of snow on the high mountain tops surrounding the city.

Climate data for San Fernando del Valle de Catamarca (1991–2020, extremes 1941–present) (Note: The record highs and lows are based on the Universidad Nacional de Catamarca for the period 1941–1980 and 1996–2005 while records beyond 1961 come from the Servicio Meteorológico Nacional link since it only covers from 1961–present. When these 2 sources are used together, the record highs and lows are from the period 1941–present)
Month	Jan	Feb	Mar	Apr	May	Jun	Jul	Aug	Sep	Oct	Nov	Dec	Year
Record high °C (°F)	45.8 (114.4)	44.4 (111.9)	44.8 (112.6)	38.3 (100.9)	39.3 (102.7)	34.7 (94.5)	38.6 (101.5)	41.9 (107.4)	44.4 (111.9)	47.0 (116.6)	47.1 (116.8)	47.7 (117.9)	47.7 (117.9)
Mean daily maximum °C (°F)	34.5 (94.1)	33.0 (91.4)	31.3 (88.3)	27.6 (81.7)	23.4 (74.1)	20.2 (68.4)	20.3 (68.5)	24.3 (75.7)	27.7 (81.9)	30.8 (87.4)	32.8 (91.0)	34.6 (94.3)	28.4 (83.1)
Daily mean °C (°F)	27.8 (82.0)	26.4 (79.5)	24.6 (76.3)	20.7 (69.3)	16.2 (61.2)	12.2 (54.0)	11.7 (53.1)	15.8 (60.4)	19.8 (67.6)	23.7 (74.7)	26.0 (78.8)	27.6 (81.7)	21.0 (69.8)
Mean daily minimum °C (°F)	21.9 (71.4)	20.8 (69.4)	19.2 (66.6)	15.0 (59.0)	10.3 (50.5)	5.6 (42.1)	4.5 (40.1)	7.7 (45.9)	12.2 (54.0)	16.9 (62.4)	19.6 (67.3)	21.3 (70.3)	14.6 (58.3)
Record low °C (°F)	9.6 (49.3)	8.0 (46.4)	5.3 (41.5)	0.6 (33.1)	−3.7 (25.3)	−6.2 (20.8)	−9.0 (15.8)	−6.6 (20.1)	−5.9 (21.4)	2.3 (36.1)	5.8 (42.4)	8.9 (48.0)	−9.0 (15.8)
Average precipitation mm (inches)	80.9 (3.19)	73.8 (2.91)	50.1 (1.97)	31.1 (1.22)	12.7 (0.50)	7.0 (0.28)	4.1 (0.16)	2.9 (0.11)	5.6 (0.22)	24.4 (0.96)	45.1 (1.78)	73.4 (2.89)	411.1 (16.19)
Average precipitation days (≥ 0.1 mm)	8.3	6.8	6.6	5.5	3.6	2.2	1.8	1.1	2.0	3.8	5.4	7.3	54.3
Average snowy days	0.0	0.0	0.0	0.0	0.0	0.1	0.1	0.0	0.0	0.0	0.0	0.0	0.1
Average relative humidity (%)	55.0	59.1	62.5	65.0	66.5	65.3	56.4	44.7	40.5	44.4	47.0	50.2	54.7
Mean monthly sunshine hours	238.7	209.1	189.1	177.0	170.5	159.0	186.0	204.6	174.0	217.0	231.0	223.2	2,379.2
Mean daily sunshine hours	7.7	7.4	6.1	5.9	5.5	5.3	6.0	6.6	5.8	7.0	7.7	7.2	6.5
Percentage possible sunshine	61.2	55.7	50.9	55.5	53.2	47.0	57.5	56.1	45.3	54.3	61.2	60.3	55.7
Source 1: Servicio Meteorológico Nacional (percent sun 1991–2000)
Source 2: Universidad Nacional de Catamarca (extremes from the period 1941–1980 and 1996–2005)

== Economy ==
Agriculture is San Fernando del Valle de Catamarca's chief economic activity; however, low rainfall makes irrigation necessary. Fruit and grapes are grown in the oasis areas near the city, and there is a considerable production of wine. Other local production includes preserves and handwoven ponchos.

Cotton and cattle are important economically, as well as mining at the Farallón Negro, Bajo de la Alumbrera and Capillitas mines where gold, silver, copper and tin are extracted.

== Sports ==
The most successful football clubs in Catamarca are San Lorenzo de Alem, Atlético Policial, Sarmiento, and Villa Cubas.

Catamarca was a host of the 1982 FIVB Volleyball Men's World Championship at the Polideportivo Fray Mamerto Esquiú.

== Gallery ==
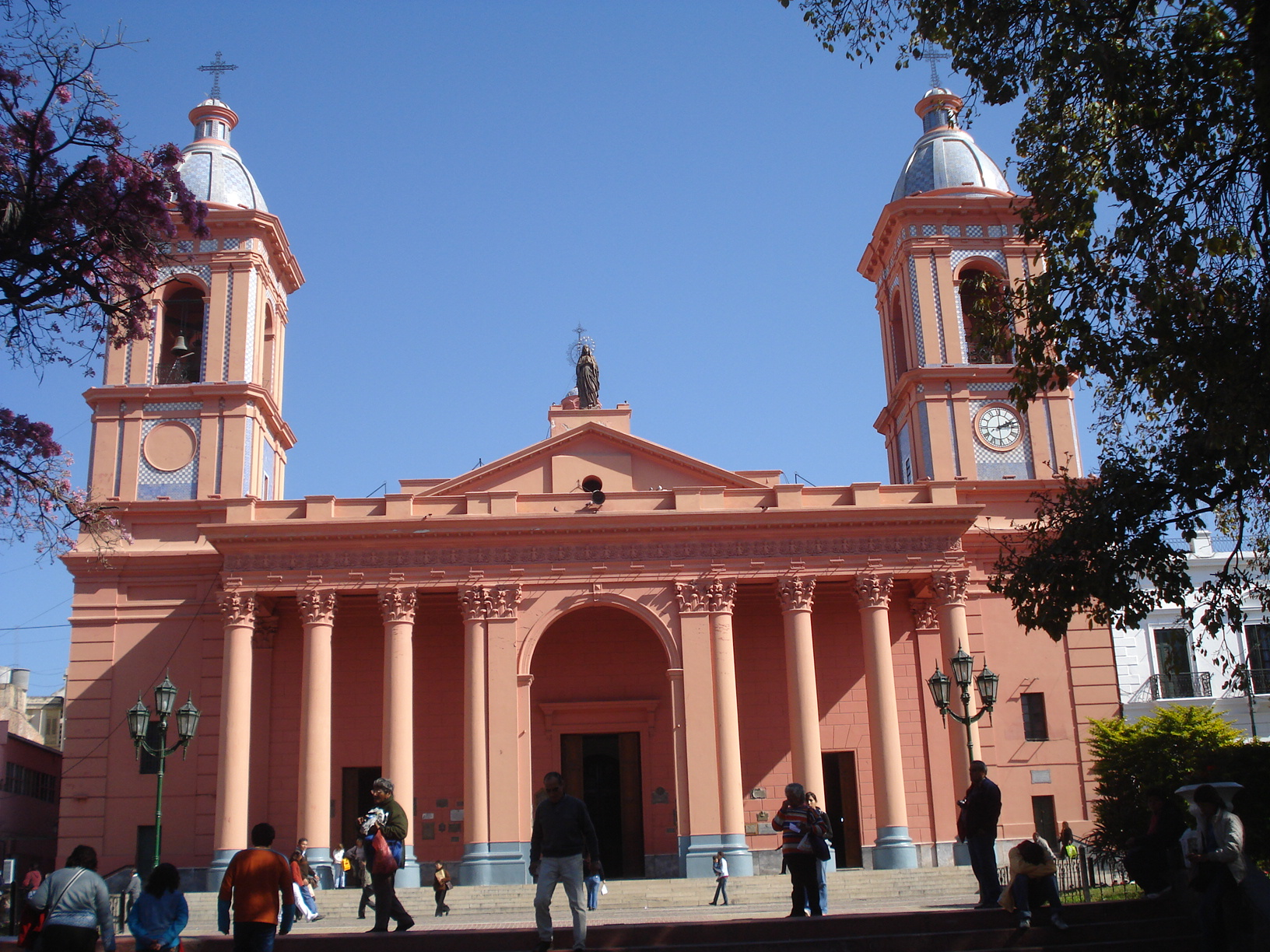
Cathedral of Our Lady of the Valley

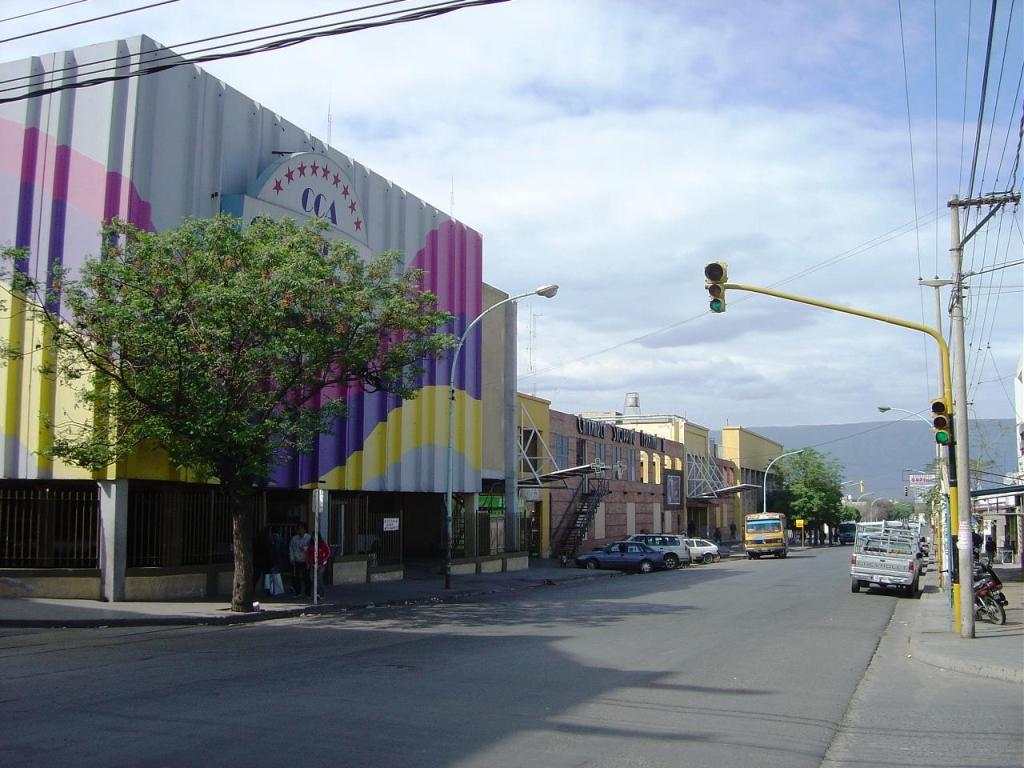
Güemes Avenue and the omnibus terminal

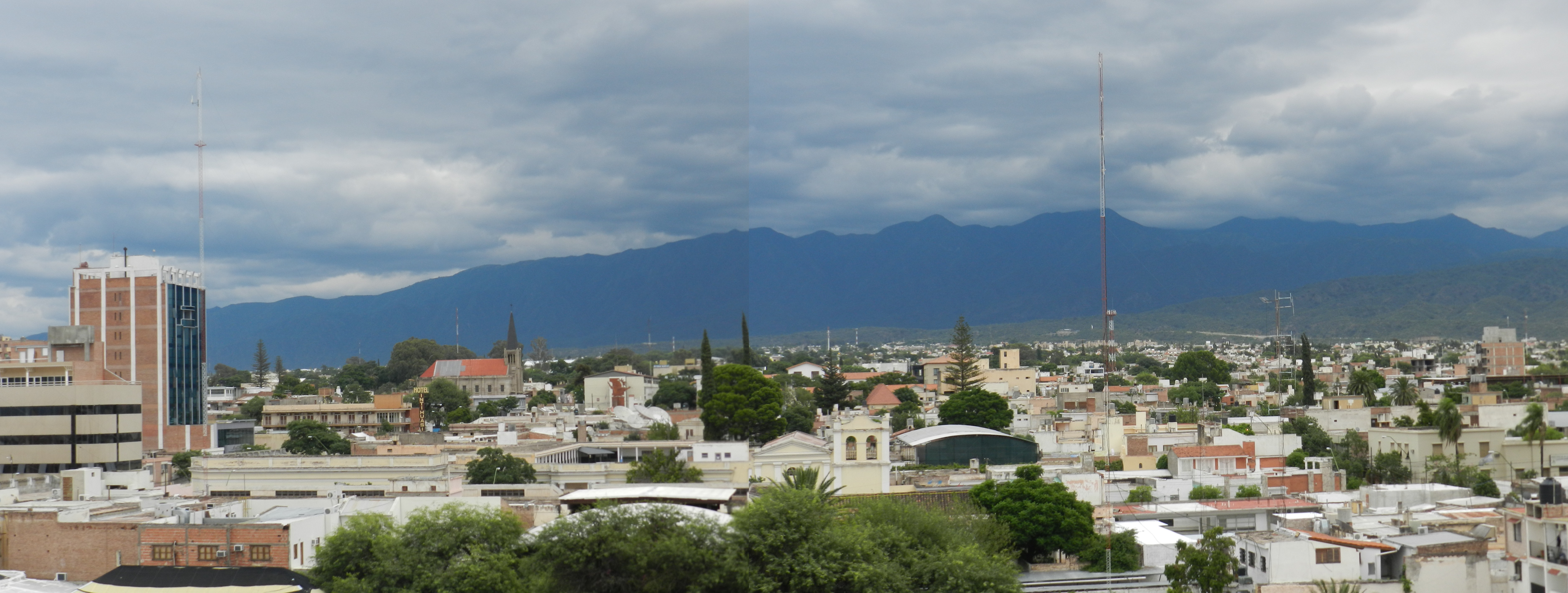
Urban landscape of the city with the Ambato mountain in the back.

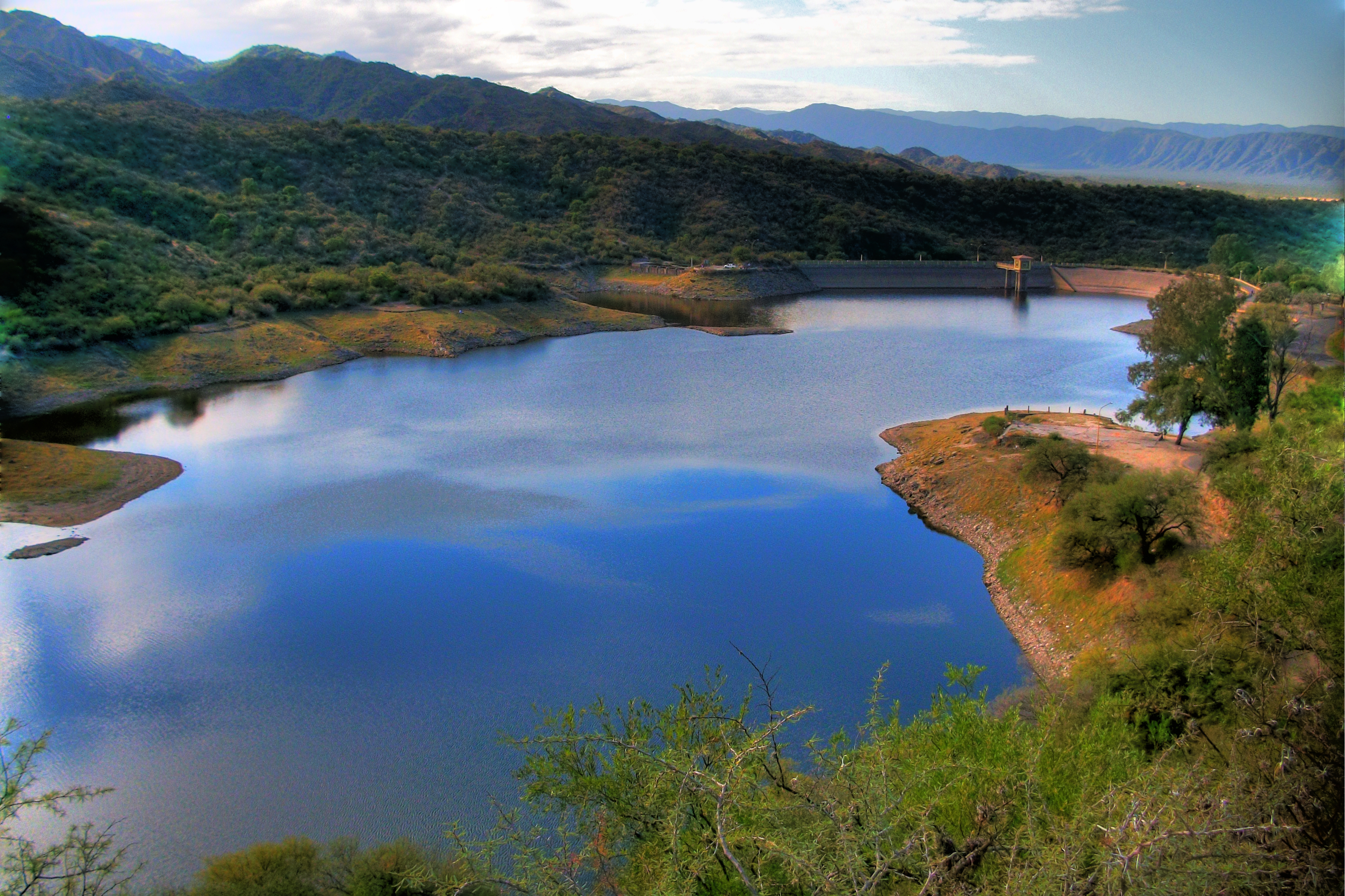
El Jumeal dam.

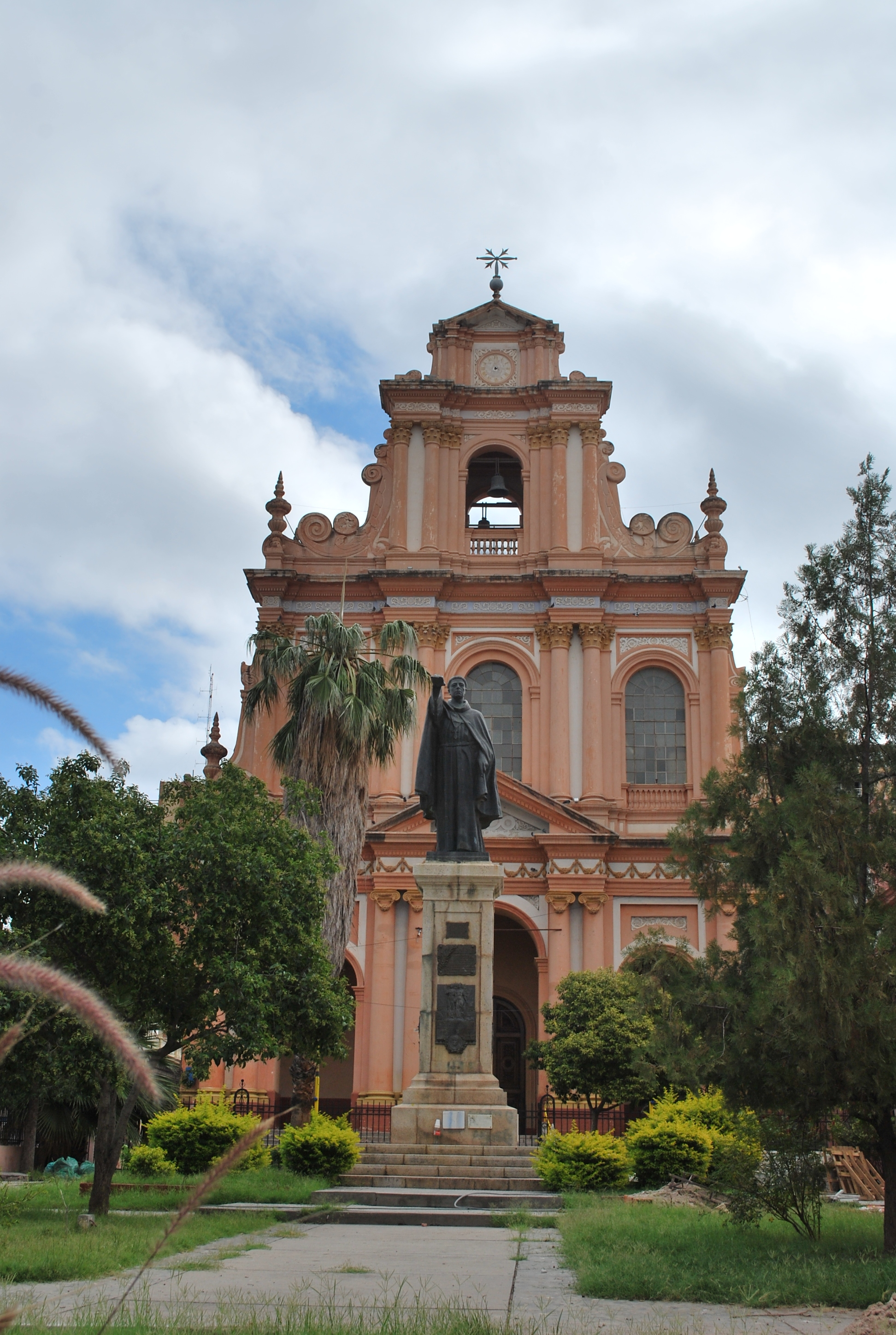
The San Francisco Convent front, in the city center of San Fernando del Valle de Catamarca.

== Notable people ==
- Eduardo Brizuela del Moral (1944–2021), politician
- Duilio Brunello (1925–2021), Peronist politician
- Mario Antonio Cargnello (born 1952), clergyman
- María Colombo de Acevedo (1957–2021), politician
- Raúl Jalil (born 1963), politician
- Agustín Tapia (born 1999), padel player

== See also ==
- Catedral Basílica de Nuestra Señora del Valle
