= Catamarca Province =

Province of Argentina

Catamarca
- Province
- Province of Catamarca; Provincia de Catamarca (Spanish)
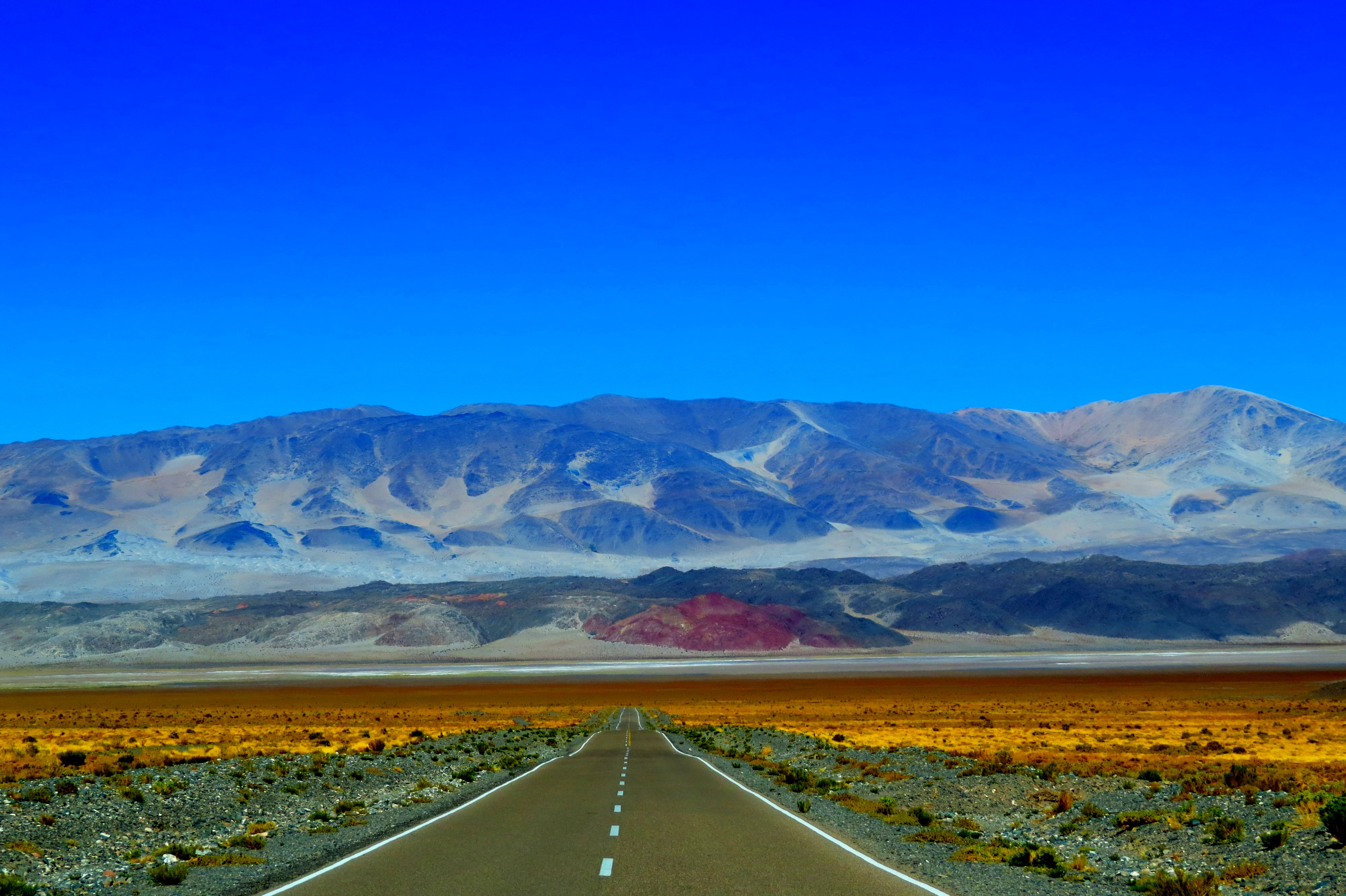
- Road to Campo de Piedra Pomez

- Flag Coat of arms

- Location of Catamarca within Argentina
- Coordinates: 28°28′08″S 65°46′45″W
- Country: Argentina
- Capital: San Fernando del Valle de Catamarca
- Departments: 16
- Municipalities: 36

Government
  - Governor: Raúl Jalil (PJ/UxP)
  - Vice Governor: Ruben Dusso
  - Legislature: Chamber of Deputies (41); Senate (16)
  - National Deputies: 5
  - National Senators: Flavio Fama (UCR); Guillermo Andrada (PJ); Lucía Corpacci (PJ)

Area Ranked 11th
  - Total: 102,602 km^{2} (39,615 sq mi)

Population (2022 census)
  - Total: 429,556
  - Rank: 20th
  - Density: 4.18662/km^{2} (10.8433/sq mi)
- Demonym: catamarqueño

GDP
  - Total: US$5.0 billion
  - Per capita: US$12,000
- Time zone: UTC−3 (ART)
- ISO 3166 code: AR-K
- HDI (2021): 0.844 very high (7th)
- Website: www.catamarca.gov.ar

Catamarca (Spanish pronunciation: [kataˈmaɾka]) is a province of Argentina, located in the northwest of the country. The province had a population of 429,556 as per the 2022 census [INDEC], and covers an area of 102,602 km^{2}. Its literacy rate is 95.5%. Neighbouring provinces are (clockwise, from the north): Salta, Tucumán, Santiago del Estero, Córdoba, and La Rioja. To the west it borders the country of Chile.

The capital is San Fernando del Valle de Catamarca, usually shortened to Catamarca. Other important cities include Andalgalá, Tinogasta, and Belén.

== Geography ==
Eighty percent of Catamarca's territory of 102,602 square kilometers (2.7% of the country total), is covered by mountains, which can be grouped into four clearly differentiated systems: the Pampean sierras, in the east and center; the Narváez-Cerro Negro-Famatina system, in the west; the cordilleran-Catamarca area of transition, in the western extreme; the Puna, an elevated portion, in the northwest.

The scarce water resources in Catamarca's arid and semi-arid climate zone determine the human settlement pattern. Agricultural activities are concentrated in pockets and valleys between the mountains. In the east the population is concentrated around a number of water courses, from which water is distributed by canals and irrigation ditches.

=== Climate ===
Köppen–Geiger climate classification map for Catamarca

The province is located in the semi–arid region of Argentina. Mean annual precipitation of the province is around 400 to 500 mm (16 to 20 in) which decreases significantly to the west. The province is characterized by the presence of different microclimates based on variations in altitude. In general, there are three different climatic zones found within the province.

The northeastern parts of the province have a subtropical highland climate that is characterized by abundant rainfall and high temperatures. Summers are hot while winters are mild with abundant humidity. At the highest peaks of Sierra del Aconquija, snow cover is permanent.

Most of the province and its intermontane valleys have an arid climate. Within these valleys which includes the provincial capital, the climate is characterized by its extreme aridity, large thermal amplitudes (different between day and night temperatures) and strong northeastern winds. The region is characterized by abundant sunshine with winds predominantly coming from the northeast and southeast. Nonetheless, there is large variation between different locations owing to differences in altitude and differences in the relief and altitudes of the surrounding mountains that enclose the valleys. Mean annual precipitation ranges from 500 to 700 mm (20 to 28 in) in the eastern parts of the region (some areas receive more than 1,000 mm (39 in)) to less than 150 mm (6 in) in the west. In the arid valleys, mean annual precipitation is around 160 mm (6 in). Most of the precipitation occurs during summer, falling as short but heavy bursts with the rest of the year being dry. Mean annual temperatures range between 16 and 18 °C (61 and 64 °F) with eastern and central parts having mean annual temperatures of 20 °C (68 °F). In summer, the mean temperature is 25 °C (77 °F) although they can reach up to 45 °C (113 °F). Winters, with a mean temperature of 10 °C (50 °F) are characterized by frequent frosts. Locations in the west experience colder winters due to their higher altitudes with temperatures that can decrease to −30 °C (−22 °F). During winter, the Zonda wind occasionally occurs, leading to very dry conditions that can lead to dust storms.

In the extreme west of the province is the Puna region, mostly located in the Antofagasta de la Sierra Department. The region has a desert climate with very low precipitation; most of it is concentrated during summer. This is due to the mountains that block moist air from Pacific Ocean. Mean annual precipitation decreases from north to south and from east to west; some areas receive an annual rainfall of 50 mm (2 in). Owing to its high altitude, the climate is characterized by low temperatures. The thermal amplitude is large, reaching up to 40 °C (72 °F) due to the combination of low humidity and high solar radiation.

== History ==
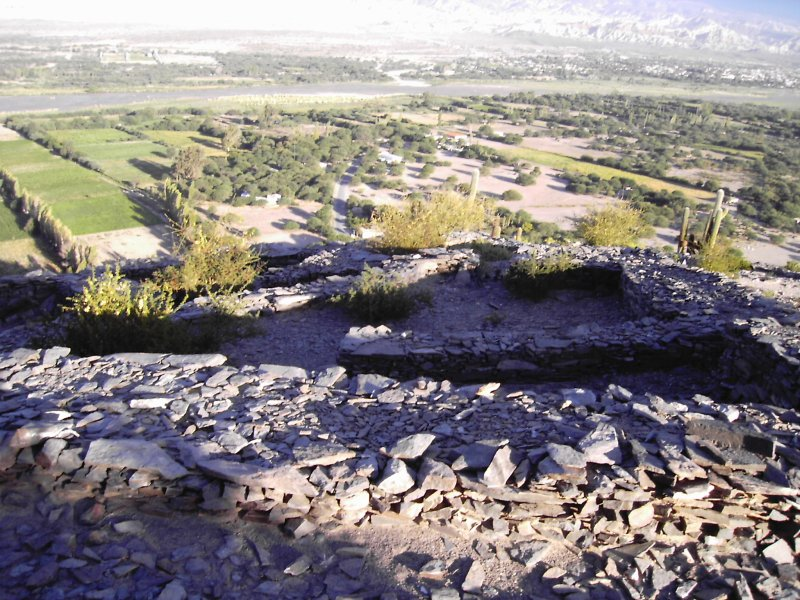
Archaeological remains of the Pucará civilization, Santa Maria del Yokavíl.

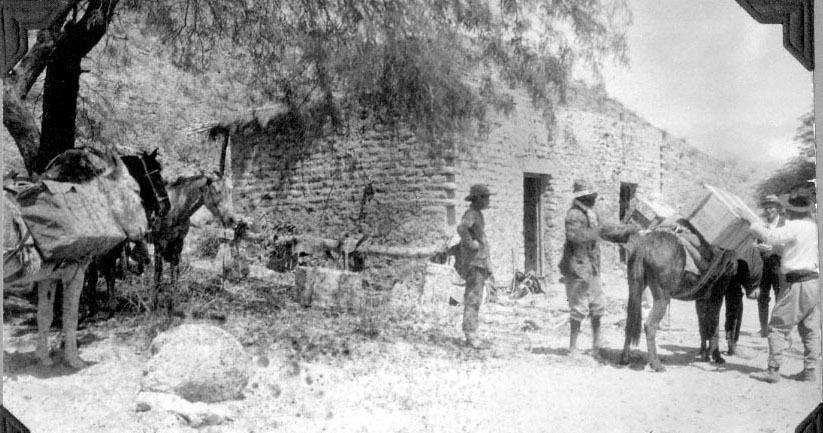
Loading fossil specimens on mules, Field Museum paleontology expedition, rural Catamarca, 1926

Before the arrival of the Spanish conquest, most of today's Catamarca was inhabited by the Diaguitas indigenous people, including the fierce Calchaquí tribe. In 1558 Juan Pérez de Zurita founded Londres de la Nueva Inglaterra, but since it was constantly under attack by indigenous people its population remained small; it was re-founded several times at new sites with new names. The sixth foundation was by Fernando de Mendoza Mate de Luna on July 5, 1683, with the name San Fernando del Valle de Catamarca.

When the Viceroyalty of the Río de la Plata was created in 1776, Catamarca obtained the title of Subintendencia under the Salta intendency. In 1821, the province claimed its autonomy, and Nicolás Avellaneda y Tula (grandfather of Nicolás Avellaneda) was elected as the first governor of the province.

The name is believed to come either from Quechua cata 'slope' and marca 'fortress', or from Aymara catán 'small' and marca 'town'.

Catamarca remained isolated from the rest of Argentina by its mountains until 1888, when the rapidly expanding railways first appeared in the province. Attracting immigrants with its spacious, fertile valleys and dry, agreeable weather, Catamarca was soon favored by immigrants from Lebanon and Iran, who found Catamarca reminiscent of the fertile, orchard-lined mountain valleys of the homes they left behind.

One such family, the Saadis, became prominent in local commerce and politics (much as the Syrian Menems in neighbouring La Rioja). In 1949, the newly designated province elected Vicente Saadi as governor. Eventually, Saadi, a Peronist, would become indispensable to local politics (a Caudillo), exerting influence mostly by proxy. Upon his death in 1988, he was succeeded by his son Ramon. In 1990, however, close friends of the Saadis were involved in the brutal murder of a local teenager, Maria Soledad Morales; this cause cèlebre cost Gov. Saadi much of his popularity and, in 1991, his office, when Catamarca (for the first time) voted in a Radical Civic Union (UCR) candidate, Arnoldo Castillo. Elected to the Senate by his still considerable following, Saadi subsequently became an ally of President Cristina Kirchner, though the governor's seat remained in the UCR's column.

== Demography ==
Ethno-racial groups in Catamarca (2022 census)
1. Undeclared (94.9%)
2. Native (4.60%)
3. Black (0.50%)

According to the 2022 Argentine national census, the Province of Catamarca has 429,556 inhabitants. Annual growth rate is 2.35‰, while density amounts to 2.6 inhabitants per square kilometer. Urban population represents 70%. (1991).

== Economy ==
Catamarca's economy is Argentina's smallest, though still developed. Its 2006 economy was estimated at US$1.728 billion, or, US$5,284 per capita, 40% below the national average. Less diversified than most in Argentina, agriculture has never played an important role in the Catamarca economy (contributing less than 5% to its output). The province's livestock includes around 200,000 head of cattle, 100,000 sheep, and 150,000 goats, with an annual production of 7,000 tonnes of beef, 5 tonnes of mutton/lamb, and 10 tonnes of pork, although outbreaks of foot and mouth disease has kept at times the production from reaching full potential. Large numbers of cattle, fattened in the alfalfa fields of Pucara, Tinogasta and Copacabana, were historically driven into northern Chile across the San Francisco pass and mules were bred for the Bolivian market in the 1910s.

Mining was important in the past. After becoming less active in the early 1990s, grew to now account for over 20% of the economy. Catamarca is home to one of the largest copper gold mines in the world, Bajo de la Alumbrera, which produces approximately 600,000 ounces of gold and 190,000 tonnes of copper annually. The mine employs over 1,000 people and contributes hundreds of millions of dollars in taxes and royalties to the federal and provincial governments.

The agriculture of Catamarca focuses on wood (walnut), vineyards, olive, citrus, cotton and tobacco, for which the government gives tax cuts to facilitate economic growth, but so far with poor results and no oversight.

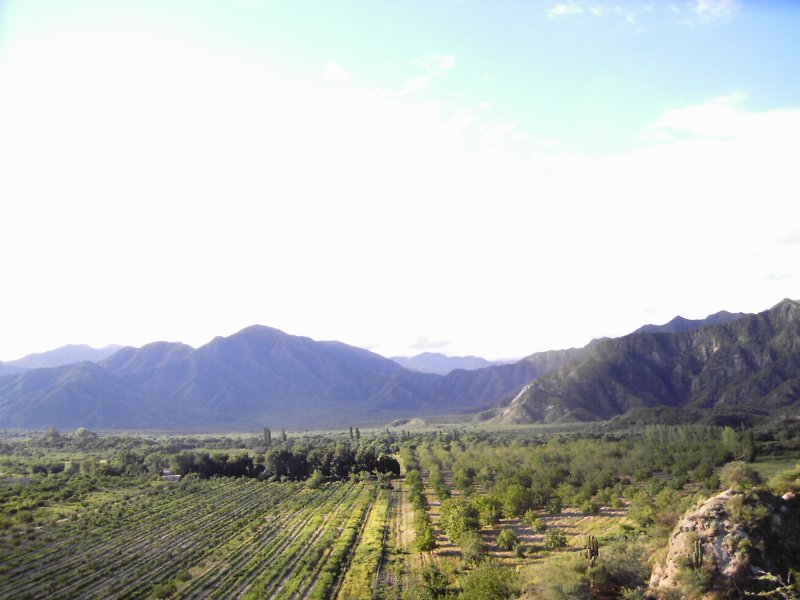
Fruit orchards near Londres.

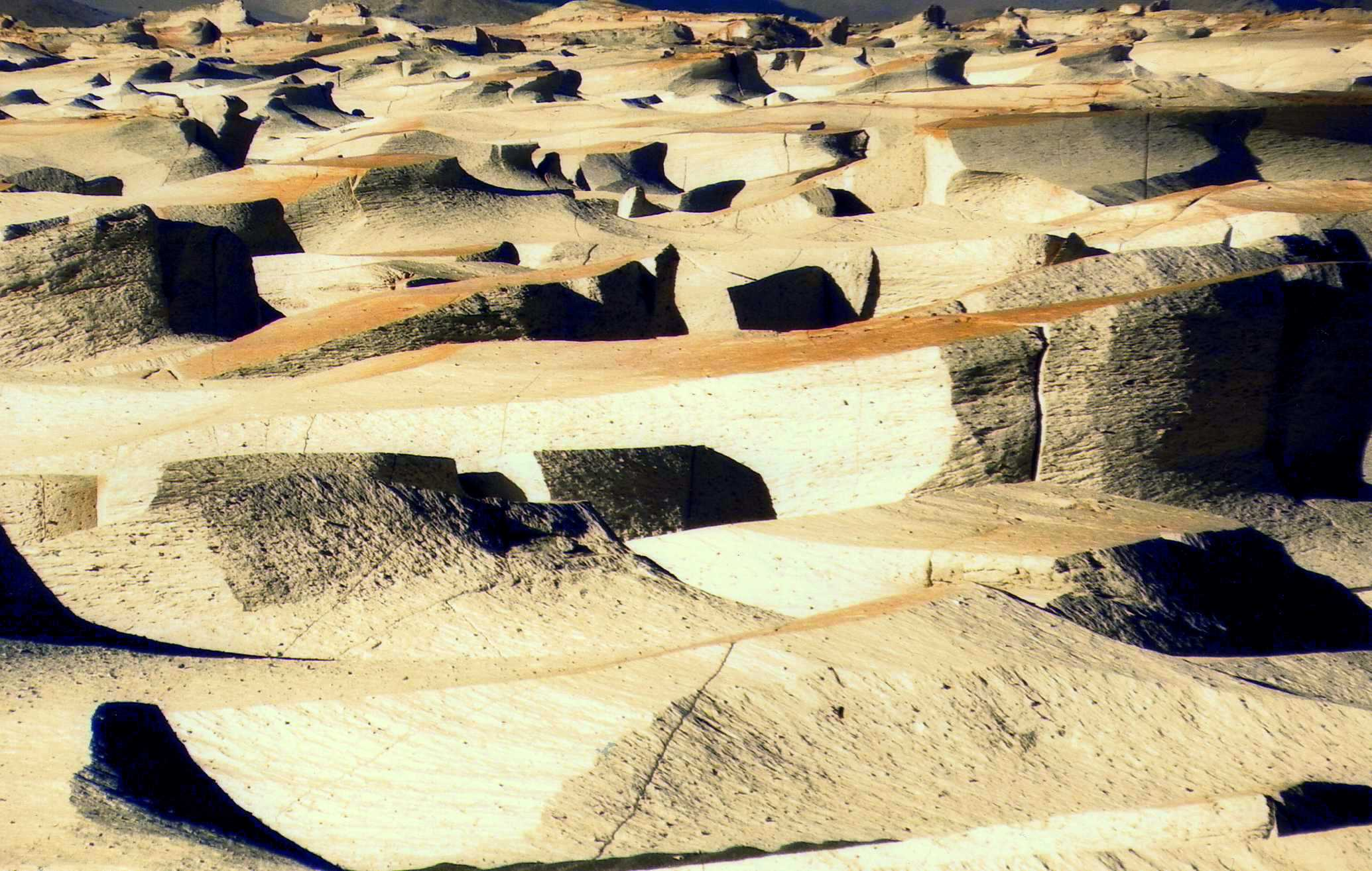
Campo de piedra pómez.

Tourism is a lesser contributor to the economy in Catamarca, with more than 3,465 beds in hotels and other types of accommodation. Although high hopes are focused in this industry, lack of infrastructure, service-oriented and trained businesses and an overall endemic corruption culture, tourism has yet to become a strong element the local economy. Mountains and geological formation are the main attraction, with sights such as Antofagasta de la Sierra, Balcones del Valle, the Snow-Covered Summits of Aconquija, and the San Francisco Pass. The road over the San Francisco Pass, an endeavor developed during the Castillo Administrations (1991–2003) at a high cost in public funds has failed to bring trade and tourism to the underdeveloped Tinogasta county. Cultural attractions include the city of Catamarca, the archaeological park Las Huellas del Inca, prehistoric petroglyphs, local music, handcrafts and wines.

== Transport ==
Major highways include Ruta 33 from Catamarca 98 km south to San Martin, 38 from Catamarca north via San Pedro 228 km to Tucuman, 60 north-west from Córdoba Province 577 km from La Guardia north-west (partly through La Rioja) to Chile by the Paso de San Francisco (4722 m), 64 west from Santiago del Estero to join 38 and 157 north from La Guardia 103 km to Frias where it connects with 89 west from Villa San Martin (Santiago del Estero), and north to Tucuman province at San Pedro, connecting with 64 near Las Cañas. There is an airport at Catamarca, the Coronel Felipe Varela International Airport.

== Government and politics ==
The provincial government is divided into the usual three branches: the executive, headed by a popularly elected governor, who appoint the cabinet; the legislative; and the judiciary, headed by the Supreme Court and completed by several inferior tribunals.

The Constitution of Catamarca Province forms the formal law of the province.

In Argentina, the most important law enforcement organization is the Argentine Federal Police but the additional work is carried out by the Catamarca Provincial Police.

Since its foundation in 1991 by the Catamarcan branch of the Radical Civic Union and minor local parties the Civic and Social Front of Catamarca has dominated state politics. It has held the governor's house in Catamarca, first with Arnoldo Castillo (1991–1999), then with his son Oscar Castillo (1999–2003), and now with the present governor, Eduardo Brizuela del Moral.

== Political division ==
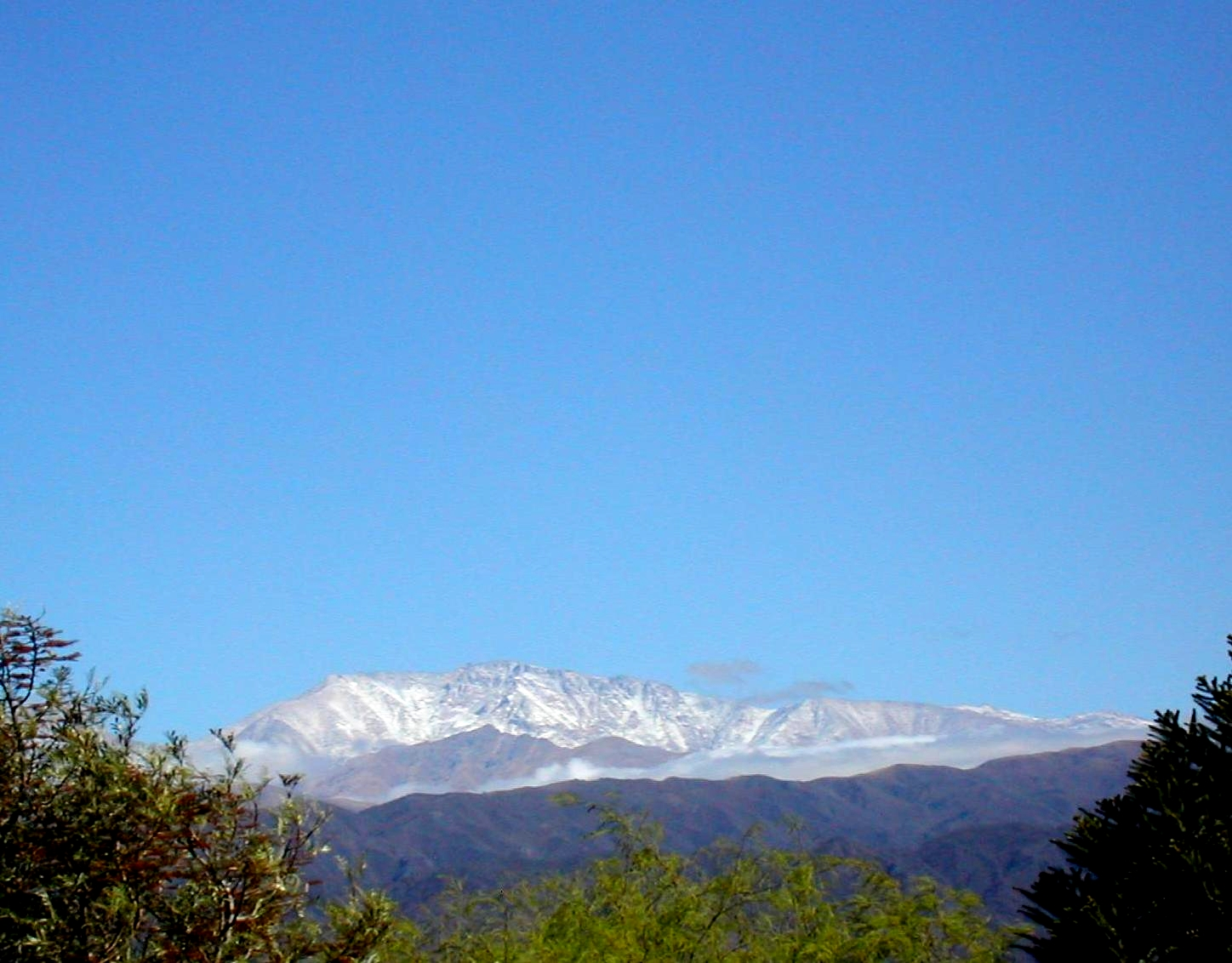
Mount El Manchao.

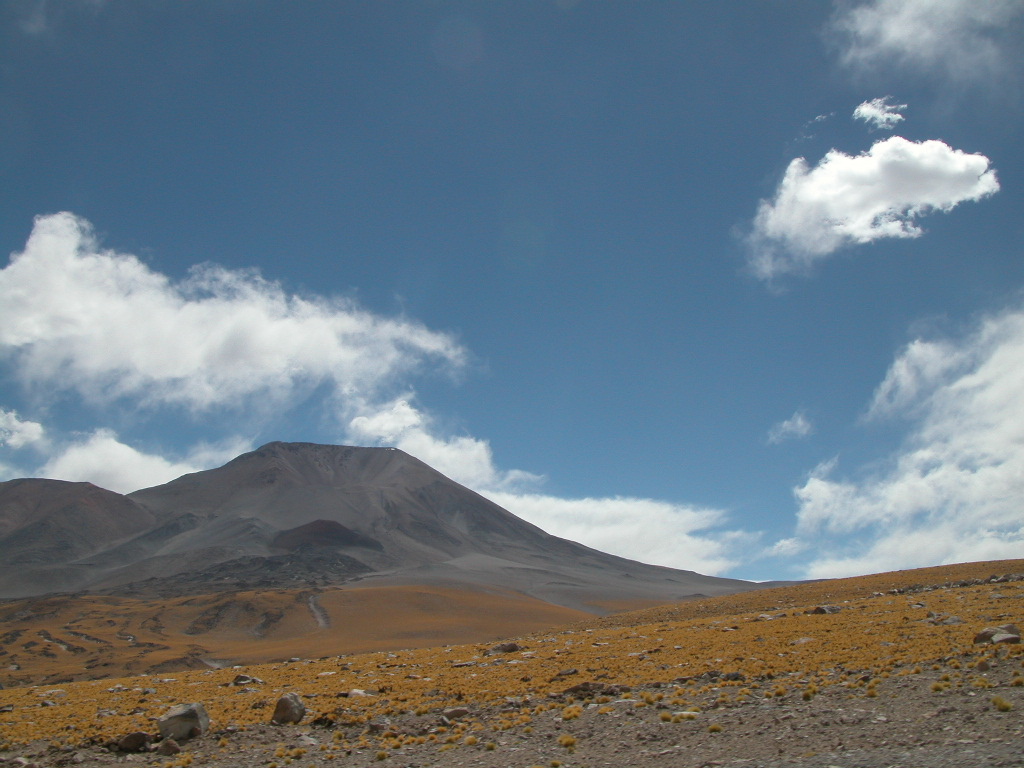
San Francisco Pass, near the border with Chile.

The province is divided into sixteen departments (Spanish: departamentos).

Department (Capital)

1. Ambato Department (La Puerta)
2. Ancasti Department (Ancasti)
3. Andalgalá Department (Andalgalá)
4. Antofagasta de la Sierra Department (Antofagasta de la Sierra)
5. Belén Department (Belén)
6. Capayán Department (Huillapima)
7. Capital Department (San Fernando del Valle de Catamarca)
8. El Alto Department (El Alto)
9. Fray Mamerto Esquiú Department (San José)
10. La Paz Department (Recreo)
11. Paclín Department (La Merced)
12. Pomán Department (Saujil)
13. Santa María Department (Santa María)
14. Santa Rosa Department (Bañado de Ovanta)
15. Tinogasta Department (Tinogasta)
16. Valle Viejo Department (San Isidro)

== Notable people ==
- Calu Rivero, first actress from Catamarca to appear in national television
- Emilio Caraffa - Post-impressionist painter
- Daniel Díaz - Footballer
- Mamerto Esquiú - Friar
- Vicente Saadi - Justicialist Party politician
