= Politics of Argentina =

- Polity type: Federal presidential representative republic
- Constitution: Constitution of Argentina

Legislative branch
- Name: National Congress
- Type: Bicameral
- Meeting place: Palace of the Argentine National Congress
- Upper house
- Name: Senate
- Presiding officer: Victoria Villarruel, Vice President of Argentina & President of the Senate
- Lower house
- Name: Chamber of Deputies
- Presiding officer: Martín Menem

Executive branch
- Head of state and government
- Title: President
- Currently: Javier Milei
- Cabinet
- Current cabinet: Ministries of the Argentine Republic
- Headquarters: Casa Rosada
- Ministries: 10

Judicial branch
- Name: Judiciary of Argentina
- Supreme Court
- Chief judge: Horacio Rosatti

The politics of Argentina take place in the framework of what the Constitution defines as a federal presidential representative democratic republic, where the President of Argentina is both head of state and head of government. Legislative power is vested in the two chambers of the Argentine National Congress. The judiciary is independent, as are the executive and the legislature. Elections take place regularly in a multi-party system.

In the 20th century, Argentina experienced significant political turmoil and democratic reversals. Argentina's first episode of democratization started with the 1912 Argentine legislative election and ended with the 1930 Argentine coup d'état. Between 1930 and 1976, the armed forces overthrew six governments in Argentina. Some historians see between military rule and periods of restricted democracy also periods of democracy (1946–1955, and 1973–1976), while other sources only consider the period 1963–1965 as barely meeting the standards of democratic transition.

Following the democratization that began in 1983, full-scale democracy in Argentina was reestablished. Argentina's democracy endured through the 2001–02 crisis and to the present day; it is regarded as more robust than both its pre-1983 predecessors and other democracies in Latin America.

== National government ==
The government structure of Argentina is a democracy; it contains the three branches of government.

=== Executive branch ===
The current Chief of State and Head of Government is President Javier Milei.

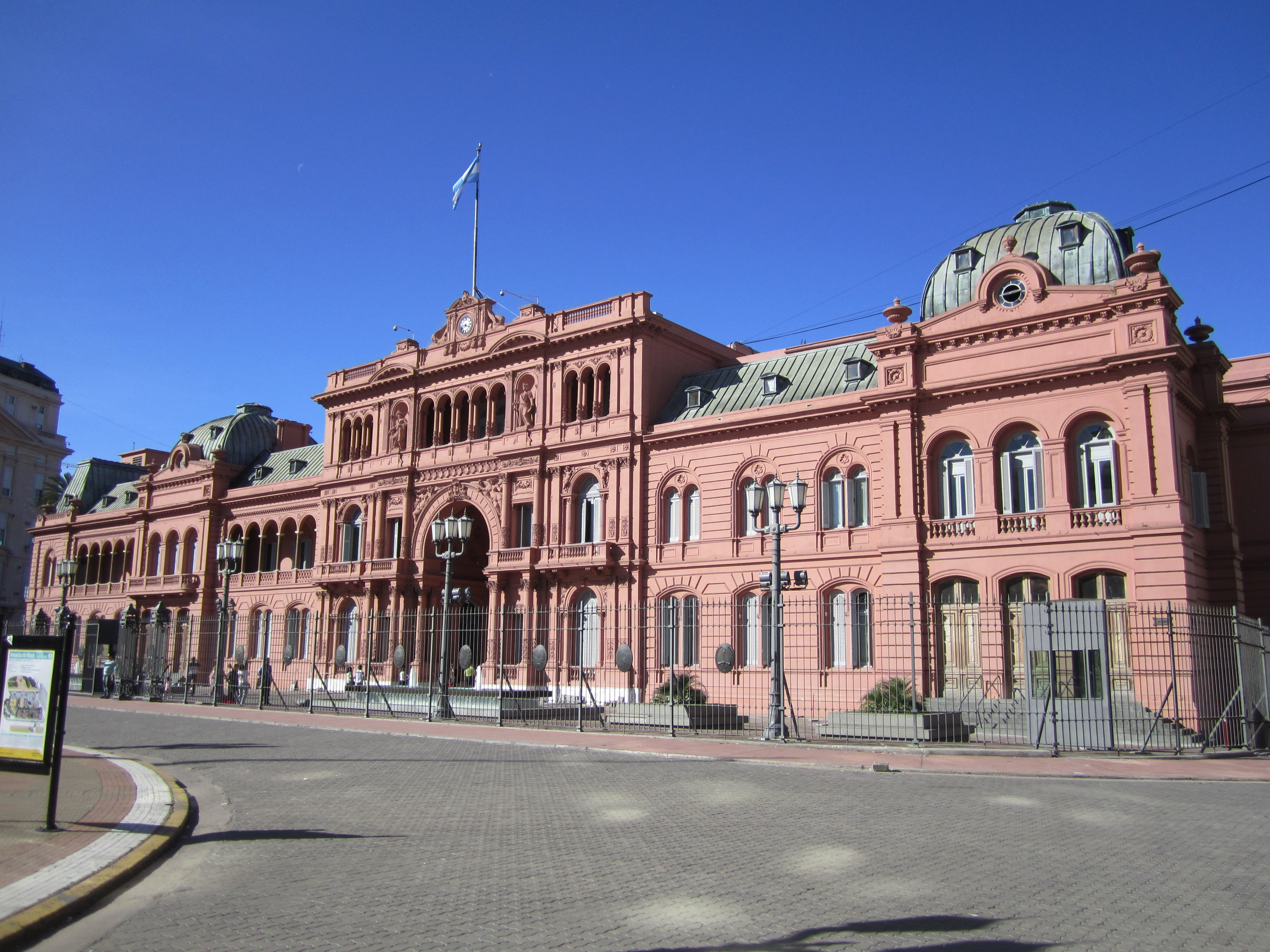
Pink House, seats the executive power.

=== Legislative branch ===
Legislative Branch is a bicameral Congress, which consists of the Senate (72 seats), presided by the vice-president, and the Chamber of Deputies (257 seats), currently presided by Martín Menem of the La Rioja Province. The General Auditing Office of the Nation and the Ombudsman are also part of this branch. Deputies serve for 4 years, while Senators serve for 6 years.

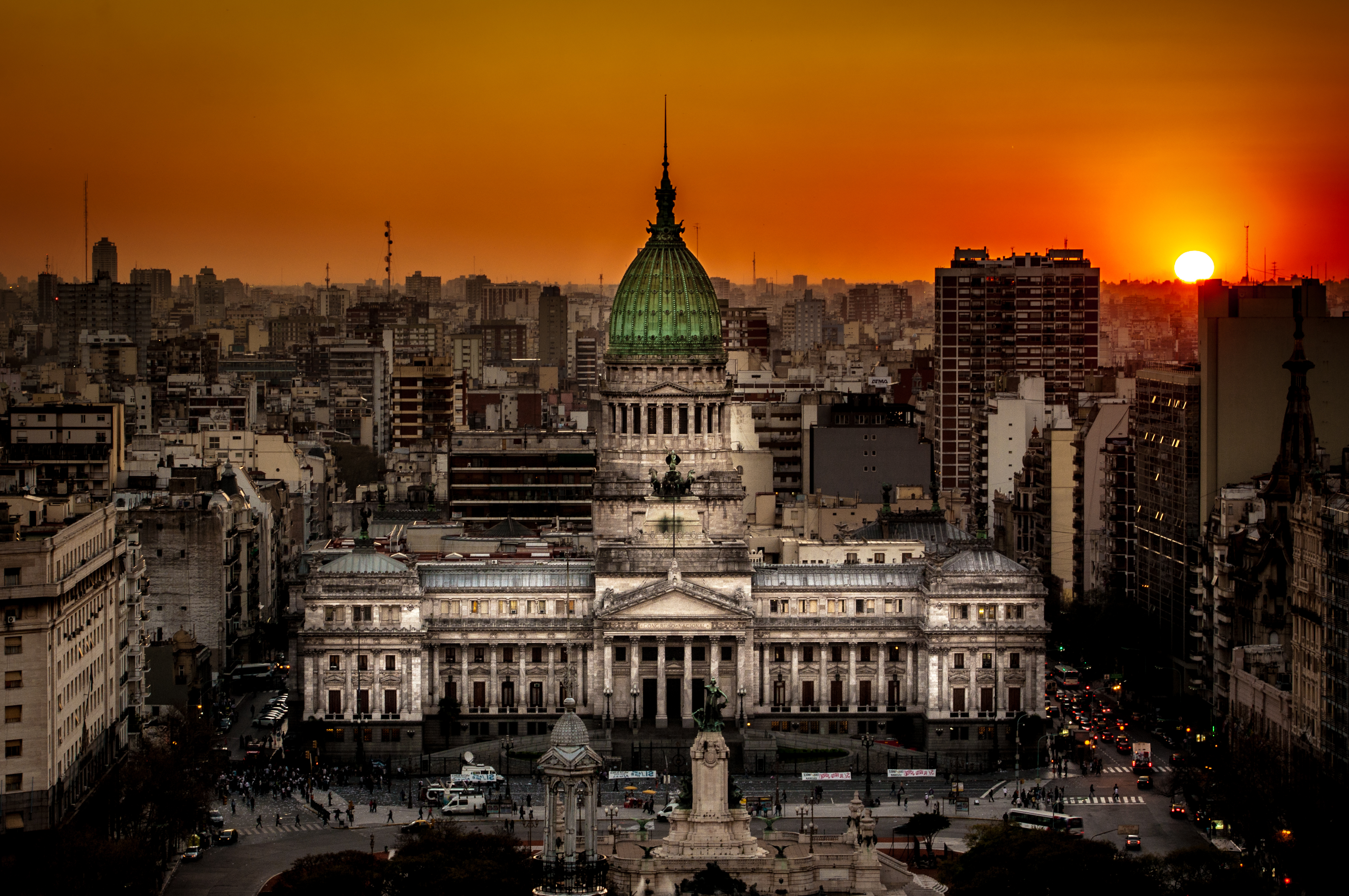
Argentine National Congress, seats the Chamber of Deputies and the Senate.

=== Judiciary branch ===
The Judiciary Branch is composed of federal judges and others with different jurisdictions, and a Supreme Court with five judges, appointed by the President with approval of the Senate, who may be deposed by Congress.

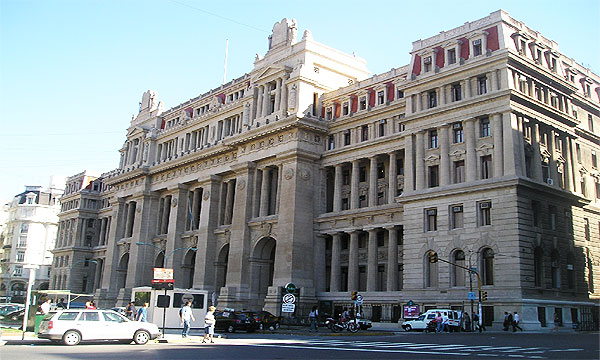
Supreme Court of Argentina.

== Provincial and municipal governments ==
Argentina is divided into 23 Provinces, the equivalent of States, and one autonomous district, CABA, inside the Buenos Aires province. Because of Argentina's federal structure, every province has its own constitution, and authorities.

Each province, except for Buenos Aires Province, is divided into departments (departamentos), or districts, which are in turn divided into municipalities. The Buenos Aires Province is different, its territory is divided into 134 districts called partidos, not municipalities.

Argentina is structured as a federal republic consisting of 23 provinces and the Autonomous City of Buenos Aires (CABA). While provincial constitutions mandate the overarching legal basis for local administration, local governance structures feature deep institutional heterogeneity across the federation. The country's subnational tier comprises approximately 2,300 local government units—spanning autonomous municipalities alongside various non-municipal local entities such as rural boards and development commissions. Structural organization and administrative classifications vary heavily by region; notably, the Province of Buenos Aires partitions its territory into 134 administrative districts known as partidos, which operate under distinct provincial oversight frameworks rather than standard municipal charters.

== History ==
Argentina's first government, autonomous from the Spanish Crown, can be traced back to May 1810 and the May Revolution, where an assembly of Argentines, called Primera Junta, took power. Because at the time it was difficult to find the right form of government, and even more difficult to consolidate a Republic, Argentina experimented with different forms of assembly, like juntas and triumvirates. The 9th of July 1816, half of Argentina's provinces signed a declaration of independence. The beginnings of Argentine state building were rough and many provinces refused to answer to a central government and sign the first constitution of 1826. In 1853, after several years of centralist power, a new constitution was passed, this one consolidated, almost fully, the Argentine Nation. Buenos Aires, still refused to be considered part of the country. After the Battle of Pavón in 1861, Buenos Aires set terms for its inclusion in the Constitution and the Republic of Argentina was born, with Bartolome Mitre as the President.

Argentina is an example where institutional instability was established after an initial period of historical contingencies. Some random insignificant historical event favors one set of institutions at the beginning. Organizations became dependent on the framework of current institutions and made further investments to profit, making it undesirably costly to switch to other types of institutions. This means that the other potentially better alternative will be unable to catch up later. Consequently, increasing returns gradually locks the economy (or political institutions) to an outcome that is not necessarily superior. People altered their expectations and stopped investing in the system as the country experienced decades of regime changes after the 1930s, seeing both rules and rule-making processes being repeatedly overturned.

Weakly enforced institutions are by design in some cases for domestic support. For example, anti-abortion was a punitive law in Argentina because many people recognize it as morally legitimate. The government put no resources into enforcing the rules, which allows the middle class to abort pregnancies in private clinics. On the other hand, strong enforcement might undermine the stability of regimes. Between 1930 and 1943, Argentine conservatives maintained power via fraud-ridden elections. After 1943, electoral rules were followed, leading to powerful actors repeatedly modifying the electoral institutions for their benefit.

=== Liberal state ===
From 1852 until 1930 Argentina experienced liberal government with first oligarchic and then democratic tendencies. From 1852 to 1916 the government, run by the landowning elite, controlled the outcome of elections by committing fraud. This was contested by the rising middle-class and working-class sectors. This fueled the creation of more unions and political parties, including the Radical Civic Union (UCR), which represented the emergent middle-class, and the Socialist Party. In 1912, Law 8871, or the Sáenz Peña Law established universal, secret and obligatory male suffrage, which marked the middle classes entering the government, and displacing the landowning elite. UCR pressured the conservative government to implement the democratic reforms.

=== Welfare state ===
Since the 1930s coups d'état have disrupted this democracy. After World War II and Juan Perón's presidency, recurring economic and institutional crises fostered the rise of military regimes. In 1930, the elected president Hipolito Yrigoyen was ousted by a right-wing led coup. In 1931 the new government held controlled elections and blocked the participation of Yrigoyen's party. This alleged elections gave way to the Concordancia, a three-party regime. They controlled the Argentine government, through fraud and rigged elections, until 1943. Several factors, including the deaths of the most prominent leaders and World War II, led to another coup that ended the Concordancia regime. This coup was led by the army, which supported the Axis powers, and modeled the new government after Italy's fascist regime. Among the military leaders was Juan Perón, who was in charge of the Secretariat of Labor and Social Welfare. He veered off the path set by the conservative army and set forth to improve the living and working conditions of workers, including giving Labor Unions support and governmental positions. He was jailed briefly, but after mass protests, he became president in the elections of 1946. His regime is known as a populist one, aided by the figure of his second wife, Eva Perón, or "Evita". Their regime produced economic growth and improvements on living and working conditions. It also passed female suffrage (1947), and nationalized the central bank, electricity and gas, urban transport, railroads, and the telephone. After the death of his wife, Perón started losing support. He was ousted in 1955 by another coup. Peronism lives on in Argentina. The next stage of the Social State was one characterized by both economic and political instability. Peron regained power in 1973, but died a year later. His third wife, Isabel, became president. She could not run the country and the military took power once again in 1976.

=== Neoliberal state ===
Jorge Rafael Videla's dictatorship began in 1976 but fell into decline in 1982 after a defeat in the Falklands War (Spanish: Guerra de las Malvinas/Guerra del Atlántico Sur, 1982), and ended in 1983 with the democratic election of President Raúl Alfonsín of the Radical Civic Union party (UCR). Alfonsín faced significant challenges, including a military uprising, and resigned in 1989, six months before the end of his term, but the country was not in clear danger of becoming subject to a dictatorship again. Carlos Menem of the Justicialist Party (Peronist) served as president for ten years (1989-1999) and made a pact with Alfonsín in order to achieve a 1994 constitutional reform that would allow him to be re-elected. Following a neoliberal program, he ruled until 1999, and then Fernando de la Rúa of the Alianza, led by the UCR, won election. This was the first time that a Peronist president properly finished his term and passed on his charge to another democratically elected president.

De la Rúa mismanaged the 1998–2002 Argentine great depression and resigned on December 21, 2001, amid violent riots. Several short-lived interim presidents came and went until Congress chose Eduardo Duhalde of the Justicialist Party (Peronist) to rule until some sort of social and economic peace could be restored. Duhalde took care of the most critical matters and called for democratic elections, which Néstor Kirchner of the Justicialist Party won (in the first use of the ballotage system). Kirchner took office on 25 May 2003. He did not run for re-election and, in December 2007, his wife Cristina Fernández de Kirchner won the 2007 elections.

=== Anarchist Movements ===
After gaining independence from Spain, Argentina faced tough questions about the direction to take their new nation state. Conservatives favored a pro agriculture society while liberals wanted to industrialize. Both parties only appealed to the small percentage of Argentine's with voting power. The vast majority of Argentine's could not vote in the 19th century because they did not own land, were not born in Argentina or were women. Thus the anarchist movement became popular amongst the non-elites and proposed reforms to the existing political structure.

==== Women in the Anarchist movement ====
Women were among the largest group in the anarchist movement. Neither liberals or conservatives found much of a purpose for women in their society in roles other than homemakers. Soon women rejected this idea and proposed reforms that combined working class and feminist struggles into a movement. These women were critical of government because of Argentina's 1870 civil code.

==== Immigrants in the Anarchist movement ====
In the early stages of their nation Argentina offered wealthy Europeans land in their country to more emulate Europe. Their particular targets were Germans who were protestant. However the most common groups of people the came to Argentina seeking land were poorer catholic Europeans from Italy and Spain. These immigrants could not vote and were discriminated against because Argentina did not have a separation of church and state yet. They quickly became anarchists and spoke out against the church.

== Elections and voting ==
=== Elections ===
Elections in Argentina have been regular since the reinstatement of democracy in 1983. Because it is a "federal" republic Argentina has national, provincial, municipal and Ciudad de Buenos Aires elections. For legislative positions elections are every two years, and for the executive power and governors every 4.

Apart from General elections and ballotage, Argentines also vote in PASO elections (primary, open, simultaneous, and obligatory elections). This is an instance before every type of election, to decide which candidates will participate in the general elections. Political parties must get at least 1,5% of valid votes to compete in general elections.

There are 16,508 elected public service positions. At the National level: the President and Vice President, 72 senators, and 257 deputies. In the Provincial level: 48 positions for Governor and Deputy Governor, 232 senators, 944 deputies, and 72 other elective positions in the provinces of Tierra del Fuego, Córdoba, Mendoza, and La Pampa. Of the 23 provinces and CABA, 15 have unicameral legislatures, which do not have senatorial elections, and 9 have bicameral legislatures. In the Municipal level: 1.122 mayors and 8.488 city councils. Other authorities add up to 5.271 positions, such as the ones in municipal commissions in 10 provinces, and members of school commissions and accounts tribunals in 5 provinces.

In 2017, Argentina passed a bill that imposed gender parity in national elections in order to reach equal participation in Congress. The bill stipulates that all the lists of candidates for Congress must alternate between male and female candidates, and that half of the list of candidates for national positions have to be made up of women.

=== Voting ===
In Argentina, voting is obligatory for any Argentine, either native or naturalized, who is 18 years old. In November 2012, the government passed a new law that allowed Argentines between the ages of 16–18 to vote optionally.

In the 2015 national elections, voter turnout was particularly high: Chamber of Deputies 74.18%, Senate 79.83%, Presidential (1st Round) 78.66%, Presidential (2nd Round) 80.90%.

== Political parties ==
=== Political parties ===
Argentina's two largest political parties are the Justicialist Party (Partido Justicialista, PJ), which evolved out of Juan Perón's efforts in the 1940s to expand the role of labor in the political process (see Peronism), and the Radical Civic Union (Unión Cívica Radical, UCR), founded in 1891. Traditionally, the UCR had more urban middle-class support and the PJ more labor support, but as of 2011 both parties are broadly based. Most of the numerous political parties that emerged in the past two decades have their origins or even the bulk of their identity tied to them.

Smaller parties occupy various positions on the political spectrum and a number of them operate only in certain districts. In the years after Perón's first years in office, several provincial parties emerged, often as a vehicle for the continued activities of Peronists, whose party was then banned, or as coalitions of politicians from all sectors wishing to take forward provincial interests. Provincial parties grew in popularity and number after the return of democracy in 1983, and took several of the provincial governor positions. Both these parties and the provincial branches of the UCR and PJ have frequently been dominated by modern caudillos and family dynasties, such as the Sapags of Neuquén and the Rodríguez Saá's of San Luis. This has in turn been a factor in the ongoing factionalism within the two principal parties at national and local levels.

Historically, the organized labor (largely tied to the Justicialist Party) and the armed forces have also played significant roles in national life. Labor's political power was significantly weakened by free market reforms during the 1990s, as well as the cooptation of its leaders by the Menem administration. They now seem to be returning to their former position, since the current government focuses on a productive model with local industry as one of the top priorities.

The armed forces are firmly under civilian control. Repudiated by the public after a period of military rule marked by human rights violations, economic decline, and military defeat, the Argentine military today is a downsized, volunteer force focused largely on international peacekeeping. While Menem and de la Rúa simply reduced their funding, Kirchner has effected an "ideological cleansing", removing a large portion of the top ranks and replacing them with younger leaders with an explicit commitment to preserve human rights and submit to the decisions of the civilian government.

A grouping of left-leaning parties and dissident Peronists –the Front for a Country in Solidarity (Frente por un País Solidario, FREPASO)– emerged in the 1990s as a serious third party, coming second in the 1995 Presidential elections. In August 1997 the UCR and FREPASO joined in a coalition called Alliance for Work, Justice and Education (informally Alianza, Alliance). The Alliance succeeded in taking Fernando de la Rúa (UCR) to the presidency in 1999, with Carlos Chacho Álvarez (FrePaSo) as vice president. Shortly after, in October 2000 Álvarez resigned after a scandal related to presidential bribes in the Senate (the President's party refused to support or investigate the accusations), so the Alliance (and even the FrePaSo) effectively broke down. Moreover, in the midst of serious economic crisis and riots, President Fernando de la Rúa resigned on December 21, 2001, leaving the UCR reputation severely damaged. The centennial party lost many of its supporters and a bunch of smaller parties emerged from its ashes.

Two of them scored well in the 2003 presidential election: Support for an Egalitarian Republic (ARI), formed on the initiative of Deputy Elisa Carrió, presented itself as a non-compromising front against corruption and for progressive ideas. ARI somewhat took the center left positions of the defunct Alliance in the ideological spectrum. In those elections, Carrió came a close fourth in. Her influence diminished afterward, as the Néstor Kirchner administration -running on center left policies- succeeded, and she took a more conservative stance, eventually dividing her party and founding a new alliance, the Civic Coalition. In June 2007, Fabiana Ríos, a National Deputy enrolled in ARI, was elected Governor of the Province of Tierra del Fuego, becoming the first governor belonging to this party.

The other splinter UCR party, called Recrear, was led by former De la Rúa Minister of Economy Ricardo López Murphy. Recrear captured the urban moderate right-wing spectrum of voters. López Murphy came third in the 2003 presidential elections, with a platform that emphasized transparency, polarizing with former President Carlos Menem. After meagre results for his 2005 senatorial candidacy, and ahead of the 2007 elections, he joined a group of Province-based parties and Macri's Commitment to Change in a new centre-right coalition dubbed Republican Proposal (Propuesta Republicana, PRO). On that ticket, Macri was elected Chief of government of Buenos Aires Autonomous City.

Since the 2008 agricultural sector strikes, political support for President Cristina Fernández de Kirchner and her husband, ex-president Néstor Kirchner, diminished considerably. The tax on agricultural exports divided the National Congress as much as the public opinion. On 27 July 2008, the tax reform was put down by a votation at the Senate, which came to be decided by the vote of Vice President Julio Cobos, effectively breaking the governmental coalition Plural Consensus. Since then, a fraction of dissident peronists allied with conservative PRO, Julio Cobos -through Federal Consensus (ConFe)- started negotiations with his former party, UCR. The Radical Civic Union, in turn, formalized an alliance with the Socialist Party and Elisa Carrió's Civic Coalition, styled the Civic and Social Agreement (Acuerdo Cívico y Social, ACyS).

For the 2009 legislative elections, former President Kirchner ran himself as a candidate to National Deputy on top of the Front for Victory (Frente para la Victoria, FPV) party in the Province of Buenos Aires. After the defeat of FPV in the 2015 presidential elections, Cristina Kirchen decided to form another party called Citizen's Unity. She ran as senator of Santa Cruz with this party and won.

=== Latest presidential elections ===
Summary of the 2023 Argentine general election

Candidate	Running mate	Party	First round		Second round	
Candidate	Running mate	Party	Votes	%	Votes	%
Sergio Massa	Agustín Rossi	Union for the Homeland	9,853,492	36.78	11,598,720	44.35
Javier Milei	Victoria Villarruel	La Libertad Avanza	8,034,990	29.99	14,554,560	55.65
Patricia Bullrich	Luis Petri	Juntos por el Cambio	6,379,023	23.81		
Juan Schiaretti	Florencio Randazzo	Hacemos por Nuestro País	1,802,068	6.73		
Myriam Bregman	Nicolás del Caño	Workers' Left Front	722,061	2.70		
Total			26,791,634	100.00	26,153,280	100.00
Valid votes			26,791,634	96.86	26,153,280	96.79
Invalid votes			451,486	1.63	450,746	1.67
Blank votes			415,737	1.50	417,574	1.55
Total votes			27,658,857	100.00	27,021,600	100.00
Registered voters/turnout			35,854,122	77.14	35,405,398	76.32

== Policy ==
Policy in Argentina after the several military dictatorships has been varied and has aimed at stabilizing the country. As stated above, Argentina's politics do not lead to a particular side, but instead take the country in many directions. Since the last military junta gave up its power in 1983, each administration that has been in power has had different priorities. President Alfonsín took office in 1983 and his main task was to ensure a peaceful transition. In the end he was overcome by an economic crisis that led to a bout of hyperinflation.

After Alfonsin, came President Menem who had to control inflation and stabilize the economy. He did so by adopting a series of radical measures including fixed parity between the Argentine peso and the U.S. dollar. He then engaged in a program to move Argentina's economy towards a liberal model. This plan included the privatization of the previously state-owned telecommunications company, oil conglomerate (YPF), airline (Aerolíneas Argentinas), railroads and utilities. As a result, large foreign direct investment flowed into Argentina for a short time, improving in some isolated cases the infrastructure and quality of service of those companies. His policies culminated in the highest unemployment rates of Argentine history and the doubling of external debt.

In the social arena, Menem pardoned military officers serving sentences for human rights abuses of the Dirty War. To balance the unpopular decision, he also pardoned some of the insurgents convicted of guerrilla attacks in the 1970s. The public scandal after the murder of Omar Carrasco forced Menem to end compulsory military conscription.

Fernando de la Rúa's term was notoriously ineffective on many accounts. Elected with a popular mandate to reinvigorate the economy and crack down on the corruption of the Menem administration, de la Rúa was unable or unwilling to perform these tasks. He continued on the same economic course of Menem, which ultimately led to the 2001 economic crash and de la Rúa's resignation. The FrePaSo ministers of the administration, elected on a wave of hope for social changes, also disappointed with a perceived lack of investment in social schemes.

Eduardo Duhalde's interim term was strongly limited by a highly mobilized society. It was marked by the need to pacify the country and soften the impact of the crisis after the forced devaluation of the local currency, the peso, which had lost three quarters of its value in a matter of months. Duhalde employed a mixture of traditional Peronist politics (in the form of a monetary subsidy for heads of families) and neo-Keynesian economic principles to stabilize the economy and bring peace to the streets.

Néstor Kirchner, who belonged to the moderate center-left wing of Peronism (rooted in the leftist Peronist factions of the 1970s), continued Duhalde's measures (even keeping his Minister of Economy, Roberto Lavagna) and added some heterodox economics. Heavy taxes on exports have served to keep local prices of valuable commodities in check, while collecting huge revenues (especially from oil products and agricultural exports like soybeans). The restrictive monetary policy of the 1990s has become aggressively expansive; the Central Bank has injected large amounts of cash into the economy and bought dollars from the free currency market in order to accumulate reserves. The fiscal policy is also expansive; the government has raised private and public salaries by decree on several occasions, and has encouraged negotiations between the private sector and the labor movements. Inflation has again become a concern. The government has struck price-freezing agreements with certain sectors of the economy (producers of milk, some foods, natural gas, etc.) and put heavy pressure on others. Failure to comply on the part of Argentine beef producers has been met with a punitive suspension of exports, starting March 2006, intended to increase domestic supply (this was then softened to a quota system).

Cristina Fernández de Kirchner came after her husband with even more liberal policies. She strictly imposed import regulations to encourage local production and exports. She started talks with financial officials to pay off Argentina's debt and promised foreign investment. In 2012, the move to nationalize YPF, an oil firm, scared off the foreign investors. She launched a conditional cash transfer program as well, called Asignación Universal por Hijo (AUH), which provided financial incentives to low-income or poor citizens for them to send their children to school and get vaccinated. During her presidency, same-sex marriage was legalized, and a new law was passed that allowed name and sex change in official documents for transgender people, even if they had not undergone sex reassignment surgery.

Mauricio Macri was elected in 2015 and he came in as a more conservative politician. Besides this, he did not implement any conservative policy. He only cut subsidies to the energy, but did not cut taxes, did not cut federal spending, did not reduce the national deficit and did not try to free the market. Because of his inability to take in serious reforms, he ordered a 50 billion dollar bailout to the IMF in order to restore the economy, which is currently in an economic crisis.

On 10 December 2019, the Centre-Left Alberto Fernández of the Justicialist Party was inaugurated President, after defeating the incumbent Mauricio Macri in the 2019 Argentine general election.

On 14 November 2021, the center-left coalition of Argentina's ruling Peronist party, Frente de Todos (Front for Everyone), lost its majority in Congress, for the first time in almost 40 years, in midterm legislative elections. The election victory of the center-right coalition, Juntos por el Cambio (Together for Change), meant a tough final two years in office for President Alberto Fernandez. Losing control of the Senate made it difficult for him to make key appointments, including to the judiciary. It also forced him to negotiate with the opposition every initiative he sends to the legislature.

In April 2023, President Alberto Fernandez announced that he will not seek re-election in the next presidential election. The 19 November 2023 election run-off vote ended in a win for far-right outsider Javier Milei with close to 56% of the vote against 44% of the ruling coalition candidate Sergio Massa. On 10 December 2023, Javier Milei was sworn in as new president of Argentina. At the time of Milei's inauguration, Argentina's economy was suffering 143 percent annual inflation, the currency had plunged and four out of 10 Argentines were in poverty. In October 2025, President Javier Milei's party, La Libertad Avanza, won a landslide victory in midterm elections, making it easier for Milei to push ahead with his programme of radical spending cuts and free-market reforms.

=== Abortion ===
In March 2018, a draft for an abortion law was debated in Parliament. The law allowed legal abortion until the 14th week of pregnancy if pregnant women were in danger of physical, psychological or social danger as well as pregnancy caused by rape or invalid fetuses. On 14 June, Parliament accepted the law with a slim majority of 129–123. The debates surrounding the bill caused demonstrations of supporters and opponents. The question of abortion is still contentious in society due to the strong influence of the Catholic Church.

== Political pressure groups ==
Some of the most important political-pressure groups in Argentina include: the Argentine Association of Pharmaceutical Labs (CILFA); the Argentine Industrial Union (manufacturers' association); Sociedad Rural Argentina and CARBAP (landowners' associations); the General Confederation of Labor or CGT (Peronist-leaning umbrella labor organization); the Roman Catholic Church; students.

== See also ==
- Argentine general election, 2007
- History of Argentina
- Argentine general election, 2015
