= List of Argentine films of 2006 =

A list of films produced in Argentina in 2006:

Argentine films of 2006
Title	Director	Release	Genre
A - B
Agua	Verónica Chen		
Amando a Maradona	Javier Vázquez		
Ana y los otros	Celina Murga		
A través de tus ojos	Rodrigo Fürth		
Bañeros III, todopoderosos	Rodolfo Ledo		
Bialet Massé, un siglo después	Sergio Iglesias		
El boquete	Mariano Mucci		
El buen destino	Leonor Benedetto		
C - D
Caballos en la ciudad	Ana Gershenson		
El Camino de San Diego	Carlos Sorín		
Cándido López – Los campos de batalla	José Luis García		
Cara de queso -mi primer ghetto-	Ariel Winograd		
Caseros, en la cárcel	Julio Raffo		
Cavallo entre rejas	Shula Erenberg/ Laura Imperiale/ María Inés Roqué		
Chicha tu madre	Gianfranco Quattrini		
Chile 672	Pablo Bardauil/ Franco Verdoia		
Como mariposas en la luz	Diego Yaker		
Crónica de una fuga	Adrián Caetano		
Cuatro mujeres descalzas	Santiago Loza		
Cuba plástica	Nicolás Batlle/ Fernando Molnar/ Sebastián Schindel		
El custodio	Rodrigo Moreno		
La demolición	Marcelo Mangone		
Derecho de familia	Daniel Burman		
Doble programa	Alejandro Millán Pastori		
E - I
El exilio de San Martín	Alejandro Areal Vélez		
Fuerza aérea sociedad anónima	Enrique Piñeyro		
Fusilados en Floresta	Diego H. Ceballos		
Gelbard, historia secreta del último burgués nacional	María Seoane y Carlos Castro		
La grúa y la jirafa	Vladimir Bellini		cortometraje de Animated
Hamaca paraguaya	Paz Encina		
J - O
Judíos en el espacio	Gabriel Lichtmann		
Lifting de corazón	Eliseo Subiela		
Lo que hay que decir	Pablo Nisenson		
La mala hora	Ruy Guerra		
Las manos	Alejandro Doria		
Martín Fierro, el ave solitaria	Gerardo Vallejo		
Mbya, tierra en rojo	Philip Cox/ Valeria Mapelman		
El método	Marcelo Piñeyro		
Mientras tanto	Diego Lerman		
Mi fiesta de casamiento	Horacio Muschietti		
Mi mejor enemigo	Alex Bowen		
Monobloc	Luis Ortega		
Nacido y criado	Pablo Trapero		
Nordeste	Juan Solanas		
Orquesta típica	Nicolás Entel		
P - S
Pacto de silencio	Carlos Echeverría		
Patoruzito: la gran aventura	José Luis Massa		
La punta del diablo	Marcelo Paván		
Que sea rock	Sebastián Schindel		
El ratón Pérez	Juan Pablo Buscarini		
El regreso de Peter Cascada	Néstor Montalbano		
Remake	Roger Gual		
Rodeo colorado	Victoria Reale		
Ruido	Marcelo Bertalmío		
Samoa	Ernesto Baca		
El santo del pueblo	Lino Pujia		
Si sos brujo: una historia de tango	Caroline Neal		
Sofacama	Ulises Rosell		
Solos	José Glusman		
Soñar no cuesta nada	Rodrigo Triana		Drama
Los suicidas	Juan Villegas		
T - Z
El último bandoneón	Alejandro Saderman		
El último confín	Pablo Ratto		
Ultra-Toxic	Jimmy Crispin		
Una estrella y dos cafés	Alberto Lecchi		
Yaipota ñande igüi - Queremos nuestra tierra	Lorena Riposati		
Yo Presidente	Gastón Duprat/ Mariano Cohn		

== See also ==
- 2006 in Argentina

== External links and references ==
- Argentine films of 2006 at the Internet Movie Database
