= El fin de la inflación =

2023 book from Argentina

El fin de la inflación (Spanish: The end of inflation) is a 2023 economic book by the current president of Argentina Javier Milei. It was written during his presidential campaign for the 2023 Argentine general election, and details his proposals to deal with inflation, a chronic problem in the Argentine economy.

== Content ==
The book is divided into three parts, and rejects the idea that inflation has several causes, describing it as a monetary phenomenon instead. Milei proposes to close the Central Bank of Argentina and let different currencies be of legal use. He considers that this would eventually lead to a dollarization of the economy, as the people would prefer the United States dollar to the Argentine Peso.

== Marketing and reception ==
The book was presented on 14 May at the Buenos Aires International Book Fair, in La Rural.

Public interest in the book raised after the presidential elections, and it was republished for the third time.
