= 2006 in Argentina =

- Decades: 1980s; 1990s; 2000s; 2010s; 2020s
- See also: Other events of 2006; List of years in Argentina

Events in the year 2006 in Argentina.

== Incumbents ==
- President: Néstor Kirchner
- Vice President: Daniel Scioli

=== Governors ===
- Governor of Buenos Aires Province: Felipe Solá
- Governor of Catamarca Province: Eduardo Brizuela del Moral
- Governor of Chaco Province: Roy Nikisch
- Governor of Chubut Province: Mario Das Neves
- Governor of Córdoba: José Manuel De la Sota
- Governor of Corrientes Province: Arturo Colombi
- Governor of Entre Ríos Province: Jorge Busti
- Governor of Formosa Province: Gildo Insfrán
- Governor of Jujuy Province: Eduardo Fellner
- Governor of La Pampa Province: Carlos Verna
- Governor of La Rioja Province: Ángel Maza
- Governor of Mendoza Province: Julio Cobos
- Governor of Misiones Province: Carlos Rovira
- Governor of Neuquén Province: Jorge Sobisch
- Governor of Río Negro Province: Miguel Saiz
- Governor of Salta Province: Juan Carlos Romero
- Governor of San Juan Province: José Luis Gioja
- Governor of San Luis Province: Alberto Rodríguez Saá
- Governor of Santa Cruz Province: Sergio Acevedo (until 30 March); Carlos Sancho (starting 30 March)
- Governor of Santa Fe Province: Jorge Obeid
- Governor of Santiago del Estero: Gerardo Zamora
- Governor of Tierra del Fuego: Jorge Colazo
- Governor of Tucumán: José Alperovich

=== Vice Governors ===
- Vice Governor of Buenos Aires Province: Graciela Giannettasio
- Vice Governor of Catamarca Province: Hernán Colombo
- Vice Governor of Chaco Province: Eduardo Aníbal Moro
- Vice Governor of Corrientes Province: Tomás Rubén Pruyas
- Vice Governor of Entre Rios Province: Pedro Guastavino
- Vice Governor of Formosa Province: Floro Bogado
- Vice Governor of Jujuy Province: Walter Barrionuevo
- Vice Governor of La Pampa Province: Norma Durango
- Vice Governor of La Rioja Province: Luis Beder Herrera
- Vice Governor of Misiones Province: Pablo Tschirsch
- Vice Governor of Nenquen Province: Federico Brollo
- Vice Governor of Rio Negro Province: Mario de Rege
- Vice Governor of Salta Province: Walter Wayar
- Vice Governor of San Juan Province: Marcelo Lima
- Vice Governor of San Luis Province: Blanca Pereyra
- Vice Governor of Santa Cruz: Carlos Sancho (until 30 March); vacant thereafter (starting 30 March)
- Vice Governor of Santa Fe Province: María Eugenia Bielsa
- Vice Governor of Santiago del Estero: Blanca Porcel
- Vice Governor of Tierra del Fuego: vacant

== Events ==
=== January ===
- 3 January: Four years after defaulting on its external debt, Argentina pays its US$9.57 billion debt with the International Monetary Fund.
- 24 January: Venezuela buys an additional US$312 million of Argentina's national debt, adding to the US$1 billion already purchased. The government of Hugo Chávez says that the scheme will further South American integration.
- 31 January: After a meeting with executives of the main supermarket chains, the government announces an extension of price agreements until the end of the year (aimed at containing inflation).
  - Brazil and Argentina agree on trade barriers (exceptions to the free trade practices of Mercosur) to preserve local industries.
  - Santa Fe cancels its water service contract with Aguas Provinciales de Santa Fe, part of the French corporation Suez.

=== February ===
- 6 February: A protest of oil industry workers blocks Provincial Route 43 in Las Heras, Santa Cruz. A violent attempt to free an imprisoned protester results in the death of a policeman.
- 7 February: The National Food Safety and Quality Service announces the discovery of 70 head of cattle with foot-and-mouth disease in the San Luis del Palmar Department, Corrientes. Major buyers of Argentine meat (such as Chile, Russia, the European Union, Israel, Brazil and Uruguay) totally or partially suspend imports. Initial estimates are US$250 million in losses for the Argentine meat export sector.
- 12 February: A rainstorm causes widespread flooding in Jujuy, especially in the capital and the cities of Palpalá and Libertador General San Martín. Over the following days 1,300 people have to be evacuated, and seven die.
- 15 February: The Argentine branch of Telefónica withdraws a suit for US$2,384 million against Argentina at the CIADI (associated with the World Bank) and announces US$300 million in investments for 2006.
  - The EU announces it will restrict Argentine meat imports only from the parts of Corrientes where foot-and-mouth disease was found.

=== March ===
- 7 March: Mayor of Buenos Aires, Aníbal Ibarra, is removed from office by an impeachment jury on accusations related to the República Cromagnon nightclub fire.
- 8 March: After several weeks of persistent rises in the cost of red meat, the Minister of Economy announces a suspension of most beef exports for 180 days, attempting to increase internal offer.
- 8 March: An Argentine military aircraft crashes after takeoff from El Alto International Airport in La Paz, Bolivia, killing all six people on board. The aircraft was a Learjet 35A.
- 13 March: The ice bridge of the Perito Moreno Glacier ruptures approximately at 11 p.m., after several days of minor activity that attracted thousands of tourists.
- 15 March: Governor of Santa Cruz, Sergio Acevedo, resigns "for personal reasons" in the midst of a scandal over illegal detention of oil union workers.
- 19 March: Top officers of the Navy are found to be involved in a vast espionage operation that included dossiers on Minister of Defense Nilda Garré, her children and their regular activities, personal information on the President, data on social activists, etc., as well as files related to the last dictatorship that the Navy had previously denied to possess. The President orders the removal of several officers and shuts off the whole Intelligence Division of the Navy.
- 21 March: The Environmental Assembly of Gualeguaychú, Entre Ríos, lifts the blockade of Route 136 that leads to Uruguay, which had started 45 days before in protest for the installation of cellulose plants on the Uruguay River.
  - The national government cancels the concession with Aguas Argentinas (of the Suez Group) for the provision of water to Buenos Aires and its metropolitan area, over low quality of services and other contractual breaches.
- 24 March: Events throughout the country commemorate the 30th anniversary of the coup d'état that started the military dictatorship of the Proceso de Reorganización Nacional. The date was declared a public holiday this year.
  - Declassified documents in the U.S. reveal that the Argentine military acknowledged 22,000 kidnappings and/or killings between 1975 and mid-1978.

=== April ===
- 3 April: The government of Buenos Aires City shuts down 18 clandestine clothing sweatshops that employed around 300 Bolivian immigrants under conditions of near-slavery, following widespread accusations.
  - The city of Tartagal, Salta, becomes practically isolated from the rest of the province after weeks of increased rainfall cause the Tartagal River to destroy or severely damage access roads and bridges.
- 20 April: Around 60% of the population of San Salvador de Jujuy (some 200,000 inhabitants) are left without water by the collapse of a master pipe. The city government delivers bottled water to affected neighbourhoods.
- 24 April: A collision between a passenger bus and a truck kills 10 people, members of two different families, in Marcos Paz, Argentina.
- 30 April: The water service starts to return to San Salvador de Jujuy after 9 days.

=== May ===
- 4 May: Argentina accuses Uruguay, before the International Court of Justice, of violating the Uruguay River Statute by unilaterally authorizing the construction of two cellulose plants on its shore.
- 8 May: The national government announces the opening of bids for the construction of a high-speed railway that will link Buenos Aires, Rosario and Córdoba by 2009.
- 23 May: Agricultural and livestock producers of La Pampa protest the national government's measures restricting exports of beef and grains with a 1,600-vehicle parade down the streets of the capital Santa Rosa and a 2,500-people assembly.
- 25 May: Celebration of the 196th anniversary of the May Revolution. Before some 100,000 people gathered at the Plaza de Mayo, President Néstor Kirchner assesses the achievements of the 3rd year of his administration, avoiding partisan discourse.
- 26 May: The Ministry of Economy partially lifts the beef export ban set in March, allowing for a quota for June–November equivalent to 40% of the exports of the same period in 2005.
  - After large losses during the week due to fears that the U.S. Federal Reserve would raise interest rates, the MERVAL index of the Buenos Aires Stock Exchange rebounds, going up by more than 6%.

=== June ===
- 21 – 26 June: Truckers boycott Chinese-owned stores after a truck driver is shot by a store manager.
- 21 June: The trial begins of Miguel Etchecolatz, a former senior police officer accused of murder, torture and forced disappearance during the Dirty War. He is the first to be prosecuted after Congress repealed the Ley de Punto Final in 2003.
- 29 June: Argentina agrees to accept a 56% increase in the price of natural gas imported from Bolivia, to US$5 per million BTU until 31 December 2006, and then to be re-calculated. Bolivia promises to increase exports, eventually to reach 27.7 million m^{3}. The agreement states that Argentina must use the gas for internal consumption only, ostensibly because Bolivia does not want it to be sold to Chile.

=== July ===
- 2 July: Sudden ice thawing and massive rain on the course of the rivers Grande and Turbio cause floodings in Tierra del Fuego, damaging parts of National Route 3 and leaving 65,000 people in Río Grande without drinking water.
  - The Argentine government calls the UK's decision to grant broad 25-year fishing licenses to Falklanders "illicit and unilateral", since the area is "subject to a sovereignty controversy".
- 6 July: An 18-year-old man from Necochea is killed, and six others are wounded in a mass shooting on Cabildo Avenue in Belgrano, Buenos Aires, by serial shooter Martín Ríos, who had been committing random shooting attacks in the area since June 2005.
- 20 July: The Summit of the Mercosur starts in Córdoba, for the first time with Venezuela as a full member, and with the presence of invited presidents Michelle Bachelet (Chile), Evo Morales (Bolivia) and Fidel Castro (Cuba).
- 22 July: Agricultural and livestock farmers go on strike, to last four days, against national government policies (lack of a development/assistance plan, exports taxes and restrictions, etc.).
- 24 July: The government launches a plan to expand the stock of cattle by 20% in 4 years, with subsidized credit and tax exemptions for farmers worth nearly 900 million pesos ($290/€225 million).
- 25 July: Argentina raises export taxes for natural gas from 20 to 45% and over a higher price, set by an agreement with Bolivia, in turn sharply increasing costs of imported gas for Chile.
- 26 July: A strong, unexpected 20-minute hailstorm in the Buenos Aires area leaves 15 wounded, hundreds of broken windows, and damage to thousands of vehicles.
- 29 July: Union and business leaders negotiate a raise of the minimum monthly wage from 630 to 800 pesos ($260, €200) in three steps, ending in November.
  - A fire in a transformer station causes a blackout in Buenos Aires City, initially leaving 228,000 without power.

=== August ===
- 4 August: Julio Simón (aka "El Turco Julián") becomes the first Dirty War criminal to be convicted and sentenced by prosecution following the repeal of the Due Obedience and Full Stop laws. He was convicted of abducting the child of "disappeared" parents and passing it on for adoption.
- 5 August: An earthquake of magnitude 5.7 in the Richter scale, with its epicenter in Barrancas, 25 km from Mendoza City and the strongest in 20 years in the area, is felt in Mendoza, La Rioja, San Juan and Córdoba. A magnitude 3.7 earthquake happens the next day in the same area. Together they cause minor or moderate damage to about 600 buildings and injuries to several people.
- 10 August: The Senate passed a law that authorizes the performance of tubal ligation and vasectomy without the need of medical reasons or spousal consent. The law mandates that surgical sterilization be done without charge in public hospitals and that it be included in labor union and private health insurance plans.

=== September ===
- 18 September: Argentina and Paraguay agree to settle Paraguay's debt of $11,000 million for the joint Yaciretá dam project. Paraguay will pay using its share of hydroelectricity, at the rate of "8000 gigawatts [sic]" per year for 40 years.

=== October ===
- 5 October: The Senate passes a law that makes sex education compulsory in all schools, private and public, starting at the initial level (5 years of age), to be implemented by each establishment respecting "its institutional body of ideas and the convictions of its members".
- 13 October: Cellulose plant conflict: Demonstrators again block border crossings between Argentina and Uruguay after the World Bank announces its decision to continue funding the disputed paper mills.
- 25 October: Argentine prosecutors formally charge the Iranian government and the Lebanese militia Hezbollah over the 1994 bombing of a Jewish centre which killed 85 people.

=== December ===
- 3 December: Russia wins the 2006 Davis Cup after a 3–2 victory over Argentina.

== Deaths ==
- 8 January: José Luis Sánchez, 31, football (soccer) player, from injuries sustained in a biking accident.
- 9 February: José María Mainetti, physician, surgeon and oncologist.
- 10 March: Alberto Migré, telenovela screenwriter and producer.
- 5 April: Marcelo Real, 48, sportscaster.
- 14 April: Raúl Quijano, 82, former foreign minister.
- 1 May: Raúl Francisco Primatesta, Cardinal Archbishop Emeritus of Córdoba.
- 4 May: Alejandra Boero, actress and director.
- 16 May: Jorge Porcel, actor and comedian.
- 25 May: Aída Luz, theater and film actress.
- 28 May: Fermín Chávez, 82, historian, complications from renal failure.
- 29 June: Fabián Bielinsky, film director.
- 8 July: Ana María Campoy, actress.
- 11 July: Oscar Moro, musician.
- 4 August: Leopoldo Bravo, politician and diplomat.
- 22 September: Enrique Gorriarán Merlo, revolutionary and guerrilla leader.
- 6 October: Eduardo Mignogna, 66, film director.
- 4 November: Delfor Medina, 78, actor.
- 16 November: Pablo Shilton, 38, actor, Car accident.
- 19 November: Julio Ramos, 71, journalist, director of Ámbito Financiero, leukemia.
- 20 November: Saúl Ubaldini, 69, labor leader and parliamentarian for the Peronist party, lung cancer.
- 22 December: Jorge Manuel López, Archbishop Emeritus of Rosario
- 26 December: Nelva Méndez de Falcone, 76, pioneering member of the Mothers of the Plaza de Mayo, lung disease.

== Sports ==
See worldwide 2006 in sports

- 7 May: Boca Juniors wins the 2006 Clausura Argentine Championship.
- 14 September: Boca Juniors wins the 2006 Recopa Sudamericana against São Paulo FC in the second match held in São Paulo.

== See also ==
- List of Argentine films of 2006
