= 2006 Argentine restriction of beef exports =

Argentina is one of the world's largest producers of beef. It is also the third-largest exporter (after Brazil and Australia), and has the world's highest consumption rate (an average of 68 kg per person per year). On 8 March 2006, President Néstor Kirchner took the drastic measure of banning all exports of beef for a period of 180 days, in order to stop continuous price rises.

Exports had soared after the collapse of 2001 forced the government to let the national currency (the peso) float and depreciate. As a result, internal prices of beef, a major staple of Argentine diet, rose considerably, and part of the beef production was diverted from the local market to importers abroad. Increasing demand, both local and foreign, also contributed to this scenario. In 2005 Argentina exported 40% more beef with respect to the previous year, for about $1.4 billion.

In late 2005 and 2006, months of unsuccessful negotiations went on between the national government and the beef producers and traders, which included considerable political and media pressure by the former. Similar negotiations to achieve "price stability agreements" (consensual price controls) with other sectors of economy had been successful to varying degrees. On 3 February 2006, several meat plant associations announced that they would limit their own exports to 20% less than the amounts recorded in 2005, but this was not done in reality.

Reference beef prices at the Liniers Livestock Market had accumulated a 26% rise only in 2006, until the ban was announced, on top of 29% during 2005. Due to its prevalence in Argentinians' diet, the price of beef has a large influence in the overall inflation rate, which had already become a concern.

The exports ban included meat cuts that are not usually consumed in the local Argentine market, but did not force exporters to cancel previously arranged contracts with foreign buyers or bilateral country-based agreements, and did not include the Hilton Quota (28,000 tonnes of high-quality frozen cuts destined to the European Union, free of tariffs). The total amount affected was estimated at 600,000 tonnes.

In addition to the ban, the government raised the exports tax from 5 to 15% for certain processed beef products, equalizing them with those applied to other products.

Immediately after the announcement, the Sociedad Rural Argentina (SRA) released a communique, stating that exporters would lose 280,000 tonnes in sales, for 585 million USD, and that many meat processing plants would go bankrupt, thus causing the loss of thousands of jobs. Moreover, the SRA denounced the ban as harmful for Argentina's international image, and as a short-term measure that would not solve the background problem (scarcity of livestock due to lack of economic incentives).

On 26 May the Ministry of Economy partially lifted the ban, allowing for a quota for June–November equivalent to 40% of the exports of the same period in 2005. This followed a period of falling beef prices in the Liniers Market (though not to the general public) and several acts of protest by livestock farming organizations, including the threat of a nationwide strike.

On 4 July the restrictions were again softened, by allowing exports for an extra 25% of the amount of 2005. The new quota included expensive beef cuts that have no demand in the internal market (such as rump and loin) and others that are only destined for corned beef. A new loosening (to 70% of the 2005 figures) was announced on 28 September.

== See also ==
- Economy of Argentina
- Foreign trade of Argentina
