= Nicolas Entel =

American film director

- Born: 14 August 1975
- Alma mater: Colegio Nacional de Buenos Aires; Boston University; Fundación Universidad del Cine
- Occupation: Filmmaker

Nicolas Entel (born 14 August 1975) is an Argentine filmmaker. He was born in Buenos Aires and lives in Brooklyn, New York. He has written, directed and produced shows for Amazon Studios, Netflix and HBO.

Entel created, wrote and show-run the Netflix’ six-part documentary series Break It All: The Story of Rock in Latin America. It features new interviews and music by almost one hundred of Latin American artists, including Charly Garcia, Fito Paez (Argentina), Ale Lora, Café Tacuba, Molotov (Mexico), Los Prisioneros (Chile), Residente (Puerto Rico) y Aterciopelados (Colombia). The series was directed by Picky Talarico and executive by Entel, along two time Academy Award winner Gustavo Santaolalla, Iván Entel and Afo Verde.

He is currently completing the post-production of an Amazon Studios’ bilingual original series, which he co-created, with Miguel Tejada-Flores, and show-run, and stars Sergio Peris-Mencheta (Snowfall), James Moses Black (This is Us) and Horacio Garcia Rojas (Narcos Mexico). The series writers also include Randal Jahnson (The Doors) and Scott Frost (Twin Peaks). All episodes were directed by Rigoberto Castañeda (Kilometro 31).

Previously, Entel wrote, directed and produced the documentary Sins of My Father, for which he reunited Pablo Escobar's son, Sebastian Marroquin (born Juan Pablo Escobar) with those of his father's most prominent victims, Luis Carlos Galan and Rodrigo Lara Bonilla. The film premiered at Sundance, and won at the Havana and Miami film festivals. Dubbed "a masterwork" by The Hollywood Reporter and "one of the great accomplishments in the history of television" by Literature Nobel Laureate Mario Vargas Llosa, it has been acquired by, among others, HBO (US), Channel 4 (UK), Discovery Channel (Lat Am), Canal + (Spain), VPRO (Benelux) and Arte (Germany and France).

His opera prima was the multiple-award-winning documentary Orquesta Tipica about the Orquesta Tipica Fernandez Fierro.

Entel is also the founder of Red Creek Productions, one of the top production services companies in Latin America. Recent projects include the movie Paddington 2 and season 3 of the English series Riviera. He has also directed and/or executive produced over 100 TV commercials for such companies as Coca-Cola and Pepsi featuring celebrities such as J. Balvin, Eugenio Derbez and Hugh Jackman. His advertising work has earned multiple awards including multiple Cannes Lions and a Grand Prix at FIAP.

Entel studied film at Buenos Aires’ Universidad del Cine (BA, film directing) and has master's degree in Broadcasting Administration from Boston University.

== Filmography ==
- Orquesta Típica (2005)
- Sins of My Father (2010)
- Break it All: The History of Rock in Latin America (docuseries) (2020)
- S.O.Z. Soldados o Zombies (series) (2020)
