= Joaquín Samuel de Anchorena =

Argentine lawyer and politician

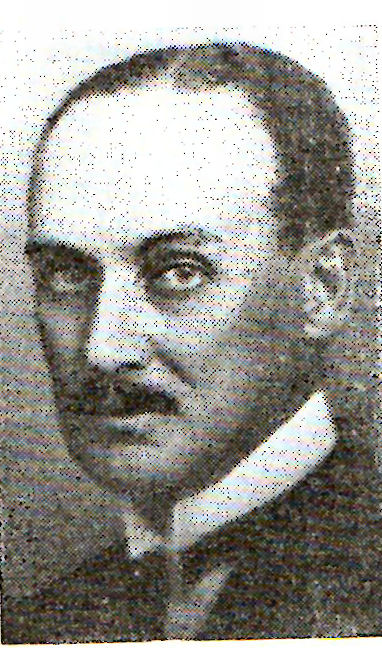

20th Mayor of Buenos Aires
- In office 21 October 1910 – 24 October 1914
- Preceded by: Manuel J. Güiraldes
- Succeeded by: Enrique Palacio

National Deputy
- In office 11 May 1908 – 20 October 1910
- Constituency: Federal Capital

Personal details
- Born: 20 August 1876 Buenos Aires, Argentina
- Died: 19 July 1961 (aged 84) Buenos Aires, Argentina
- Resting place: La Recoleta Cemetery
- Party: National Autonomist Party
- Spouse(s): Sara Justa Madero Arteaga; María Enriqueta Salas Martínez
- Children: 7
- Education: University of Buenos Aires
- Occupation: Lawyer

Joaquín Samuel del Corazón de Jesús de Anchorena Riglos (Note: In this Spanish name, the first or paternal surname is de Anchorena and the second or maternal family name is Riglos.) (20 August 1876 – 19 July 1961) was an Argentine lawyer and politician, who is noted for being the mayor of Buenos Aires between 1910 and 1914.

== Personal life ==
Anchorena became a lawyer in 1898, after studying in the Faculty of Law and Social Sciences at the University of Buenos Aires. He was a lover of rural activities, and in his youth was dedicated to keeping the La Merced Ranch, which belonged to his mother. In 1900 he married Sara Madero, who bore him three children. She died in 1911, and five years later Anchorena married his second wife, Henrietta Maria Salas. He had three other children with his second wife.

== Political life ==
He was elected National Deputy for the City of Buenos Aires in 1908. When Roque Sáenz Peña assumed the Presidency in 1910, Anchorena was recommended by the Minister of Public Works, Ezequiel Ramos Mexia, to fill the Municipality of that city. He was later appointed by the President to that office.

During his tenure he gave contracted the engineers Carlos Thays and Benito Carrasco, for the beautification of the Tres de Febrero Park, inaugurating it as the Rosedal. He also opened the first underground tramway done by the Anglo-Argentine Tramways Company (now Underground Line A), on December 1, 1913. Work was carried out on the expansion of the City Hall towards the Rivadavia street, which was extended throughout his term. His term ended in 1914.

== Accomplishments ==
Anchorena also served as Comptroller in the province of Entre Rios. He was part of the Fiscal Oilfields Directory and President of Teatro Colón.

He served as President of the Sociedad Rural Argentina (SRA) between 1916 and 1922. In 1917 he founded, within the SRA, the Biological Institute, specializing in research on health issues in agribusiness.

He was also President of the Jockey Club on two occasions (1922-1923) and 1958-1959). Since 1980 the Jockey Club has been presenting an International Award within the racing circuit, which bears his name: the International Joaquin S. Anchorena Grand Prix, for the best Latin American miler.

Anchorena died in Buenos Aires in 1961.

== Notes ==
Political offices
Preceded by Manuel J. Güiraldes	Mayor of Buenos Aires; 1910–1914	Succeeded by Enrique Palacio
