= Buenos Aires International Book Fair =

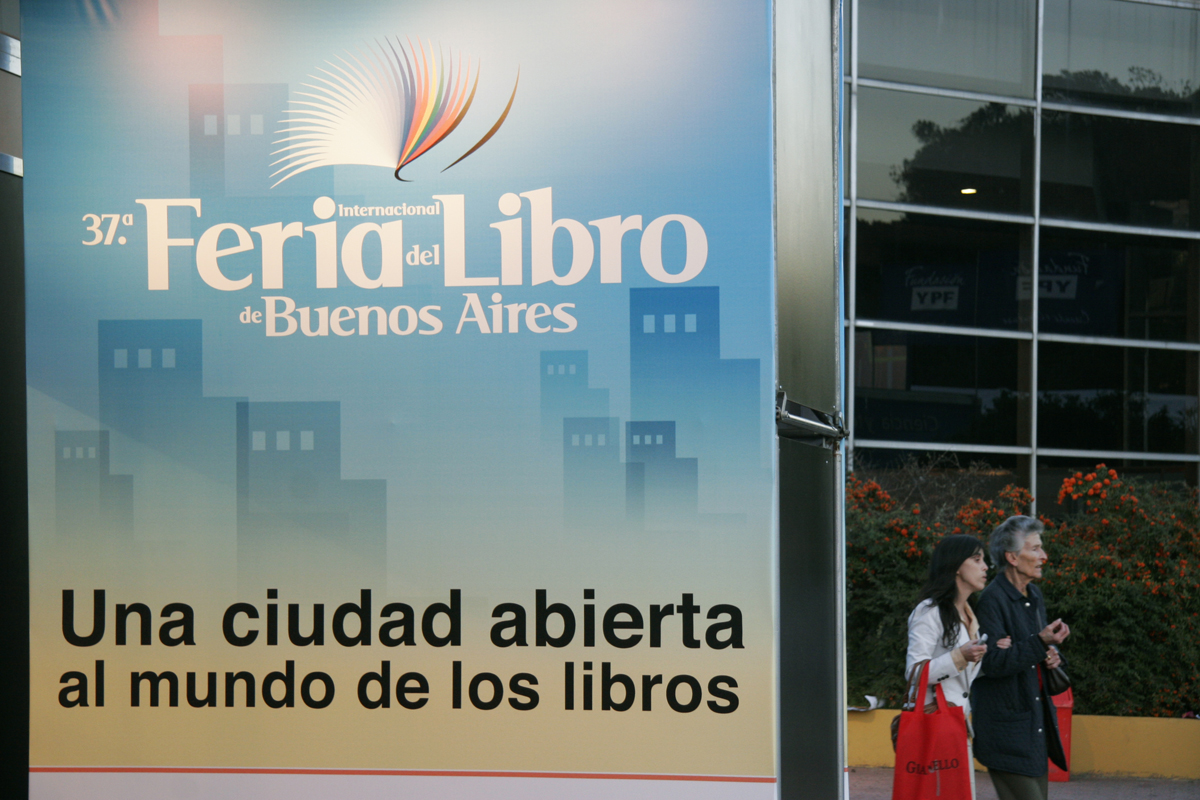
- Entrance to the Buenos Aires International Book Fair in 2011. In the same year, Buenos Aires became the UNESCO World Book Capital 2011.
- Status: Active
- Genre: Multi-genre
- Venue: Predio Rural de Buenos Aires
- Location: Buenos Aires
- Country: Argentina
- Inaugurated: 1975
- Attendance: 1,200,000
- Organizer: Fundación El Libro
- Website: http://www.el-libro.org.ar/

The Buenos Aires International Book Fair (Spanish: Feria Internacional del Libro de Buenos Aires) is held every April in Buenos Aires, Argentina, and is one of the top five book expos in the world, oriented to the literary community as well as to the general public.

== Organization ==
The expo is organized by the Fundación El Libro, a non-profit established by the Argentine Society of Writers (SADE). The fair is held each April month, lasting for nearly three weeks. There are stands distributed in eight halls, for both national and international publishing houses, countries, communities and Argentine provinces, and national and international institutions and organizations. Each annual fair has a specific motto.

The fair, open to the public, is preceded by meetings and conferences of editors, publishers, translators, booksellers and other people from the publishing business. Other conferences are aimed to the educative fields and to librarians.

== History ==
Although the fair was established in 1975, it was not the first book fair held in Buenos Aires. Earlier fairs were held at plazas, venues, or the Buenos Aires Cabildo. There was a great fair in 1930 at the Plaza de la República. Those fairs, however, were not held in regular periods. The SADE sought in 1971 a way to encourage the publishing business in Argentina, promoting more than 35 fairs in the 71-74 period. Those fairs, hosted as well at other cities of Argentina, were not limited to sell books, but included as well poetry, theatre, music or ballet performances. The SADE called most editorial houses of Argentina in 1974, and organized a new fair in closed quarters rather than in the street as it was done so far. Thus, the first fair of this type was held in March 1975 and was for years known as the "Buenos Aires International Expo, from the Author to the Reader". The first fair was held in the Centro de Exposiciones de la Ciudad de Buenos Aires, a utilitarian building in the Recoleta borough of 7,500 square meters, with 50 noteworthy authors, 116 stands from 7 foreign countries, and received 140,000 visitors.

The fair has been hosted in recent years by the Sociedad Rural Argentina in its Palermo borough expo grounds, of nearly 45,000 square meters. The number of stands has increased to 1,500 from 50 foreign countries, and the public is estimated to be nearly the 1,200,000 annual visitors.

The 2011 fair was opened by Mario Vargas Llosa, which generated political turmoil in Argentina. Vargas Llosa had criticized the policies and alleged corruption of the presidency of Cristina Fernández de Kirchner, and some Argentine intellectuals, including National Library director Horacio González, requested to prevent his presence. Kirchner instructed them to give up such requests, and Vargas Llosa opened the fair as planned. Nevertheless, ministers Aníbal Fernández and Florencio Randazzo made further critics hours before the speech. Vargas Llosa thanked the president for her intervention during his speech, which had not incidents.

The 2020 COVID-19 pandemic in Argentina and the national quarantine made a 2020 edition impossible. Initially, it was delayed on March 18. As the pandemic and the quarantine extended in time, it was held in internet instead. It lasted for three weeks, and was seen by 180,000 people at the home page, and the videos in the official Youtube channel had 53,000 views. There was no fair in 2021 either, and people attended other smaller fairs instead. The standard book fair returned in 2022.

== Famous visitors ==
The fair has been visited by many noteworthy foreign authors, such as Paul Auster, Ray Bradbury, Italo Calvino, Susan Sontag, Camilo José Cela, José Saramago, Mario Vargas Llosa, Muhammad Yunus, Tom Wolfe, Brian Aldiss, Manuel Vázquez Montalbán, Ángeles Mastretta, Rosa Montero, Nelly Sfeir Gonzalez, J. M. Coetzee, J. M. G. Le Clézio, Fernando Savater, Roger Chartier, Julián Marías, John Katzenbach, Claudio Magris, Isabel Allende, Arturo Pérez Reverte and Wilbur Smith.

Argentine authors like Jorge Luis Borges, Adolfo Bioy Casares, Silvina Bullrich, Marco Denevi, Tomás Eloy Martínez, Roberto Fontanarrosa, Beatriz Guido, Manuel Mujica Lainez, Olga Orozco, Quino and Ernesto Sabato were regular visitors of the fair as well.

== Gallery ==
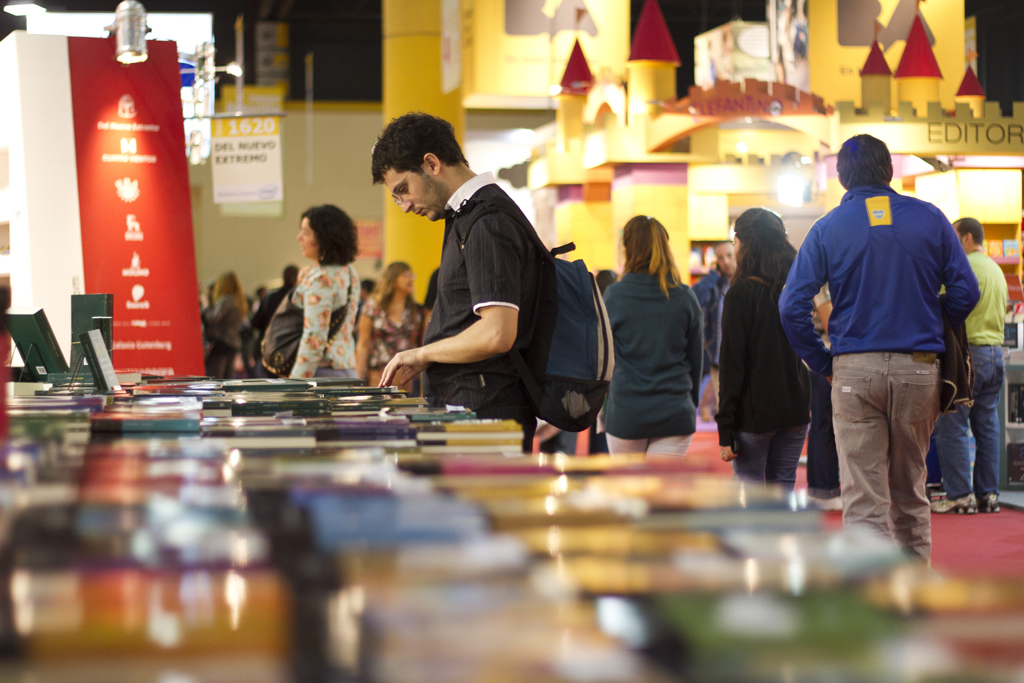

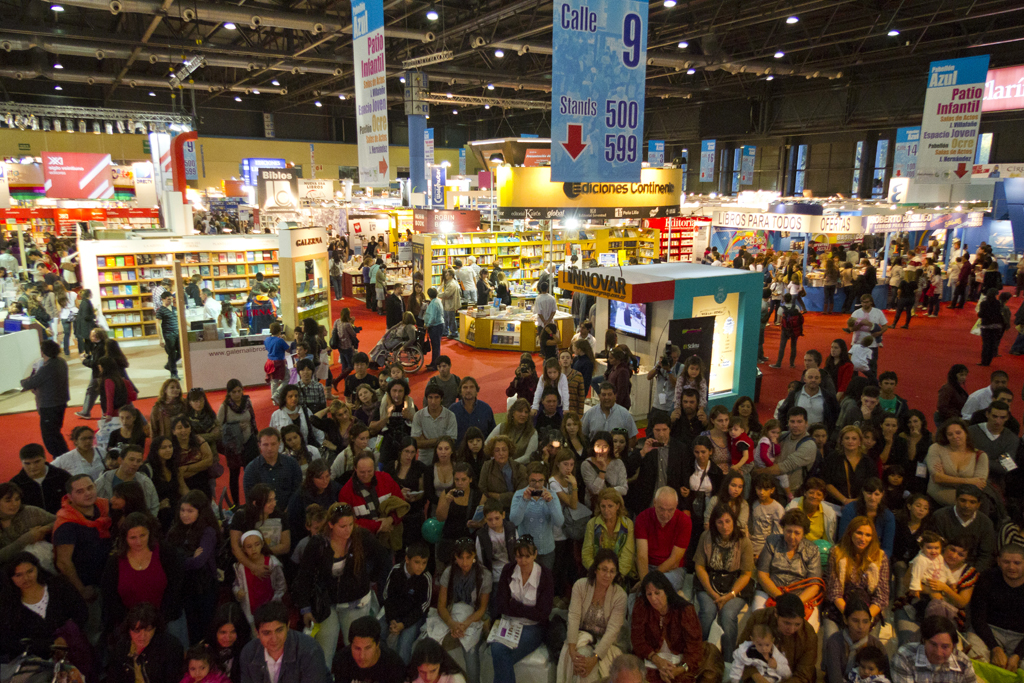

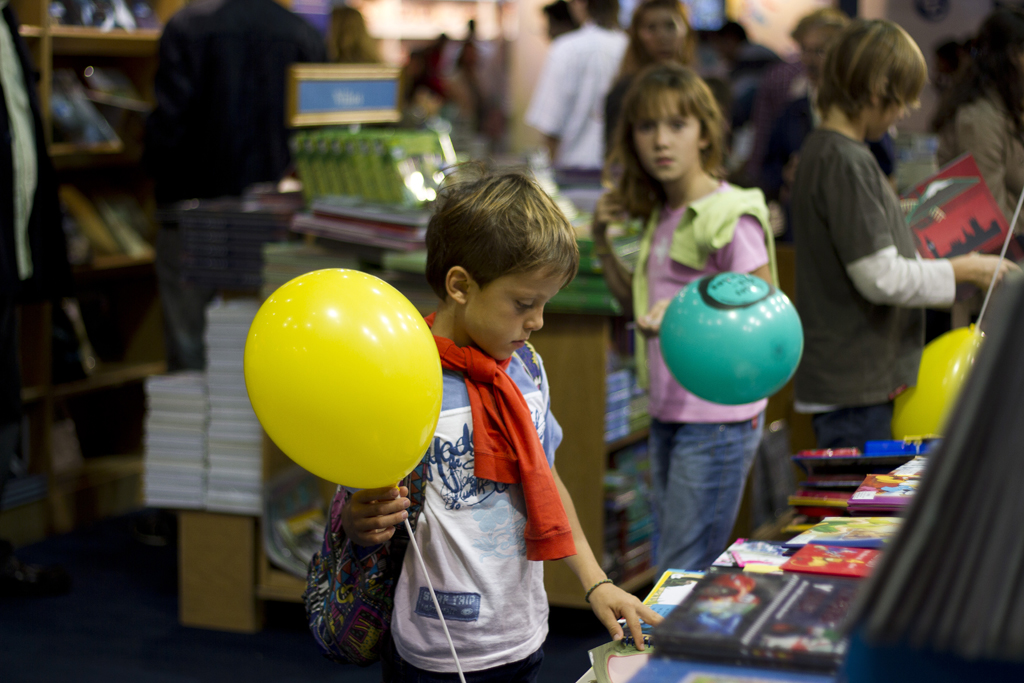

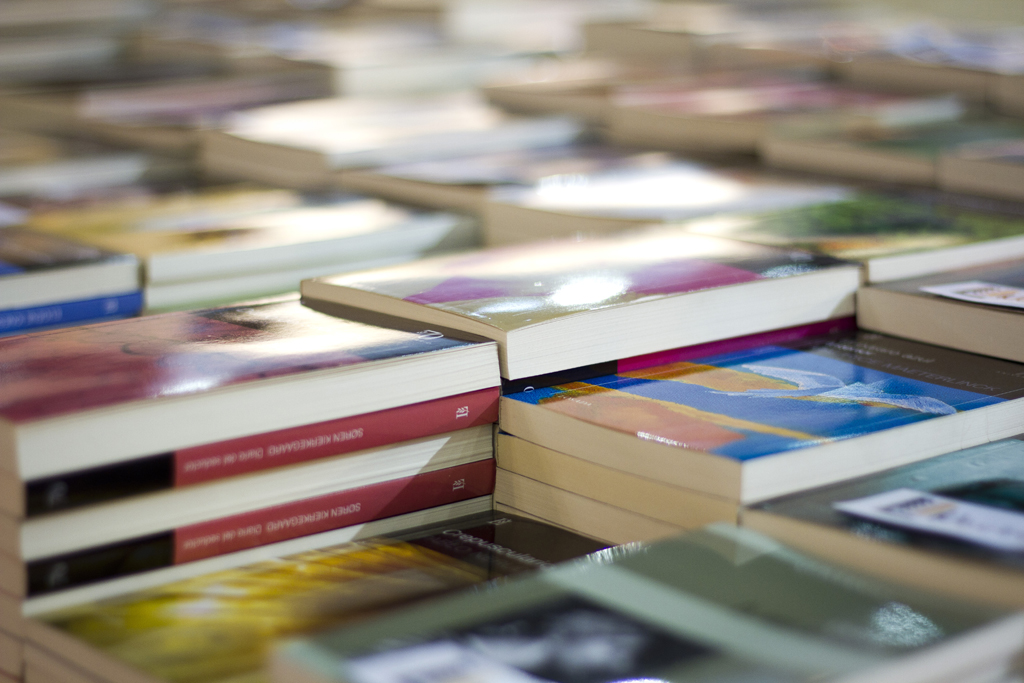

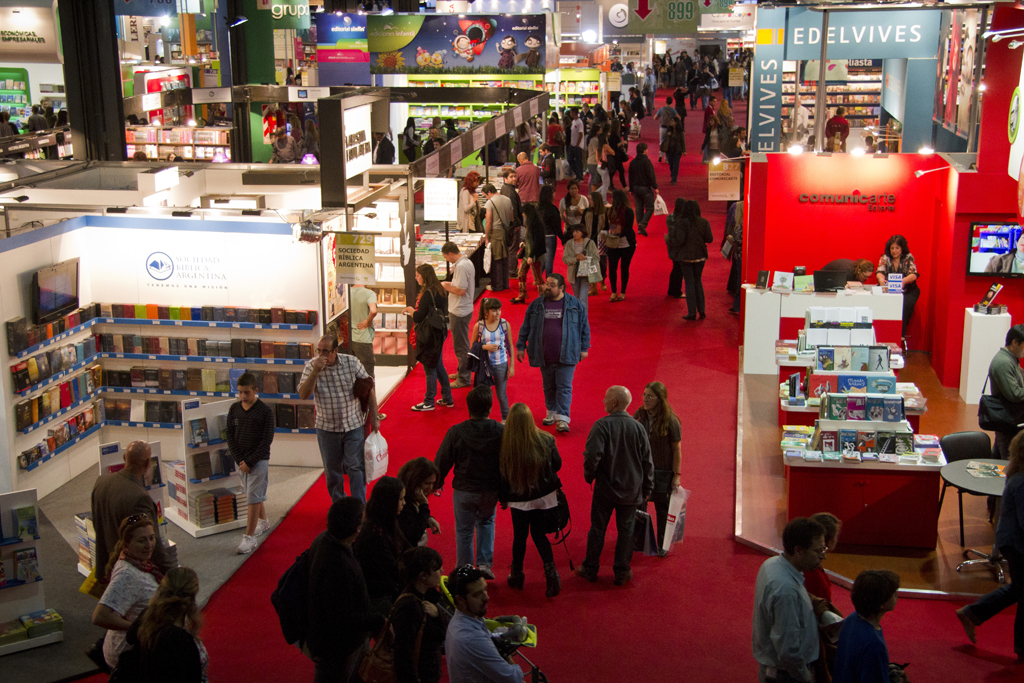

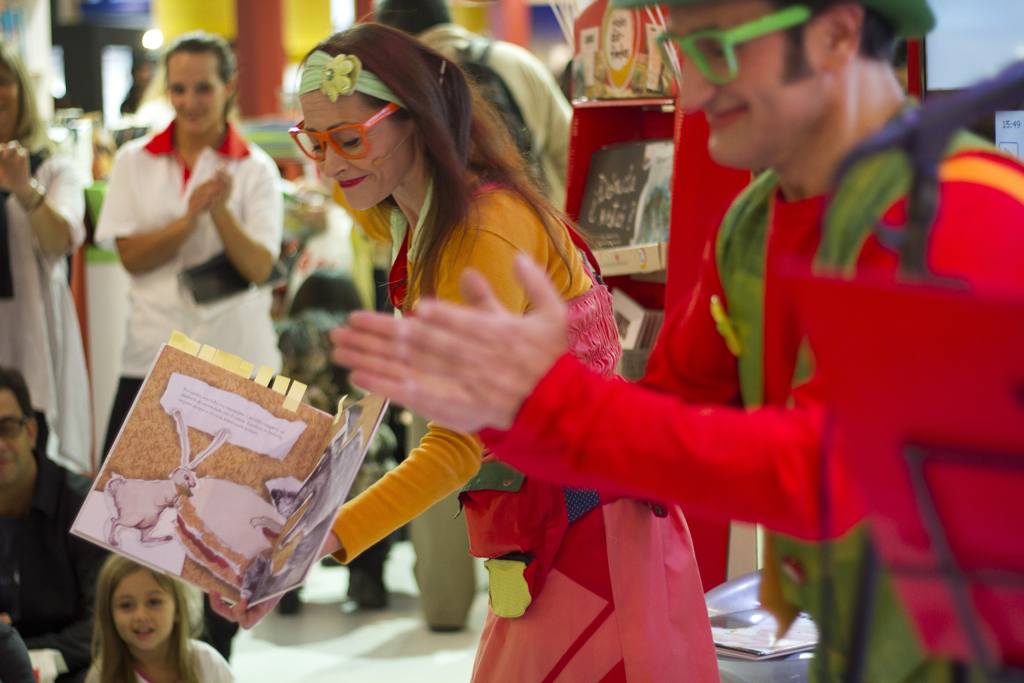
