= Sins of My Father (film) =

2009 documentary film directed by Nicolás Entel

- Directed by: Nicolas Entel
- Written by: Nicolas Entel; Pablo Farina
- Produced by: Ivan Entel, Nicolas Entel
- Release date: December 10, 2009 (Colombia)
- Running time: 94 minutes
- Countries: Argentina; Colombia
- Language: Spanish

Sins of My Father (Spanish: Pecados de mi padre) is a 2009 Argentine-Colombian documentary film directed by Nicolas Entel. It tells the story of the notorious drug lord Pablo Escobar from the inside perspective of his son, now living in Argentina under the name Sebastián Marroquín.

== Synopsis ==
In 1993, after Pablo Escobar is gunned down by the police, his then 16-year-old son Juan Pablo flees to Argentina together with his mother and sister. To avoid being identified and in fear of his life he changes his name to Sebastián Marroquín. "My life was worth $4 million ... That’s the price they put on my head," he said.

After a decade of silence, Marroquín and his mother publicly speak about the life of their family member for the first time. In an attempt to end the cycle of violence and to ask for forgiveness Marroquín travels to Colombia to meet the sons of two of his father's most prominent murder victims: presidential candidate Luis Carlos Galán and Minister of Justice Rodrigo Lara Bonilla, as well as the son of the former Colombian president César Gaviria.

In connection to telling the story of Pablo Escobar, the film explores the Colombia's recent violent history as a "narco-state" and the country's illegal drug trade.

== Production ==
In 2005, after declining multiple filmmakers, Marroquín met Entel, who suggested making a documentary focused on the sons of the two famous men Escobar ordered killed in addition to Marroquín's inside perspective. Questioned about the usefulness of Marroquín's apologizing to the sons of his father's victims for crimes he himself did not commit, Entel said the point was to promote reconciliation, "[the film] has the value of saying, 'It stops here. We are not going to inherit our parents' hatred.'"

Marroquín agreed to participate in the project on two conditions: that "Pablo Escobar" was not included in the title and that his sister was not shown. The film includes personal never-seen-before material of the Escobar family.

Entel said of Marroquin: "It was very hard to get Sebastian to agree. It took me more than six months to get him on-board. Basically, he felt that he was risking his life by finally breaking his silence and letting the world know where he was and that his name was Sebastian Marroquin. But, I think he understood that I wasn't just trying to glamourize his father's image but I was trying to do something different, telling things from the point of view of his generation. I think that's what helped him to take this chance."

== Reception ==
Fernanda Solórzano wrote about the movie in the cultural magazine Letras Libres. She wrote, "instead of humanizing the capo, the film draws his terrifying duality and his son's work to maintain his sanity in the face of his legacy".

== Awards ==
Award	Category	Recipient(s)	Result
Miami International Film Festival	Grand Jury Prize: Dox Competition	Nicolas Entel	Won
Miami International Film Festival	Audience Award: Dox Competition	Nicolas Entel	Won
Havana Film Festival	Best Doc Award	Nicolas Entel	Won
Sundance Film Festival	Grand Jury Prize: World Cinema - Documentary	Nicolas Entel	Nominated
News & Documentary Emmy Award	Outstanding Individual Achievement in a Craft: Music and Sound	David Majzlin	Won
Argentine Film Critics Association Awards	Best Documentary Feature	Nicolas Entel	Nominated
Telly Awards	Best Use of Animation 2010	Manuel Barenboim Segal	Won
