= Sociedad Rural Argentina =

Organization in Argentina

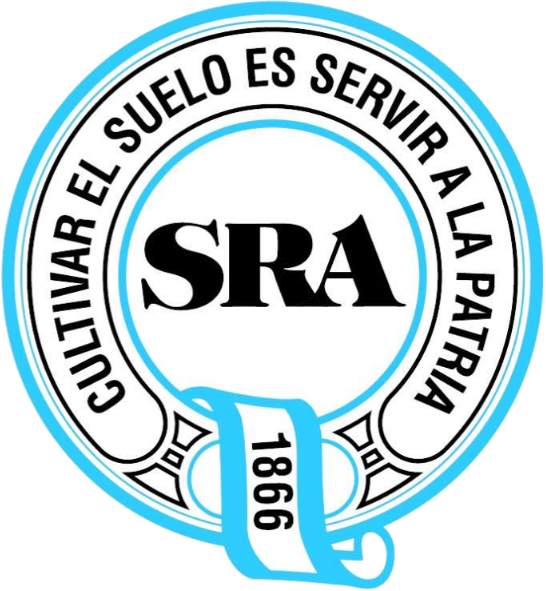
- Abbreviation: SRA
- Formation: 10 July 1866; 160 years ago
- Type: Employers' association
- Headquarters: Calle Florida 460, Buenos Aires
- Region served: Argentina
- President: Nicolás Pino
- Vice President: Marcos Pereda Born
- Secretary: Eloísa Frederking
- Website: www.sra.ar

The Sociedad Rural Argentina (SRA) is a landowners' association founded in 1866, representing large agricultural producers in Argentina's Pampas region, primarily focused on crop farming and livestock production.

The organization has played a significant role in Argentina's political and economic development since the late 19th century. Its influence began during the final years of Bartolomé Mitre's presidency, when it helped finance the Conquest of the Desert military campaign. The SRA maintained close ties with subsequent governments during the Conservative Republic period (1880–1916), with several of its members holding high-ranking positions in national administration.

== Background and history ==
=== Foundation and early influence ===
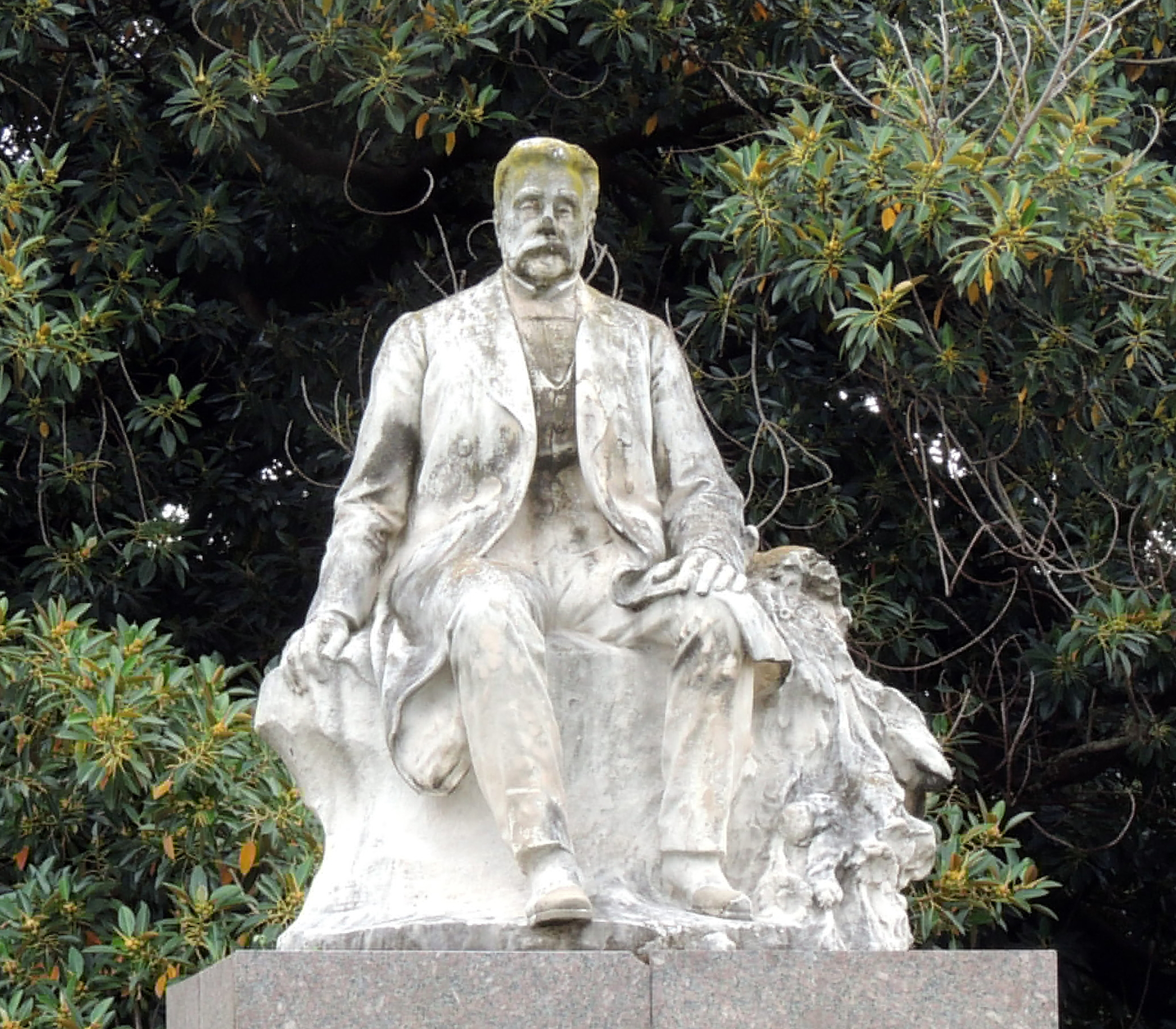
Eduardo Olivera, credited as the founder of the Sociedad Rural Argentina

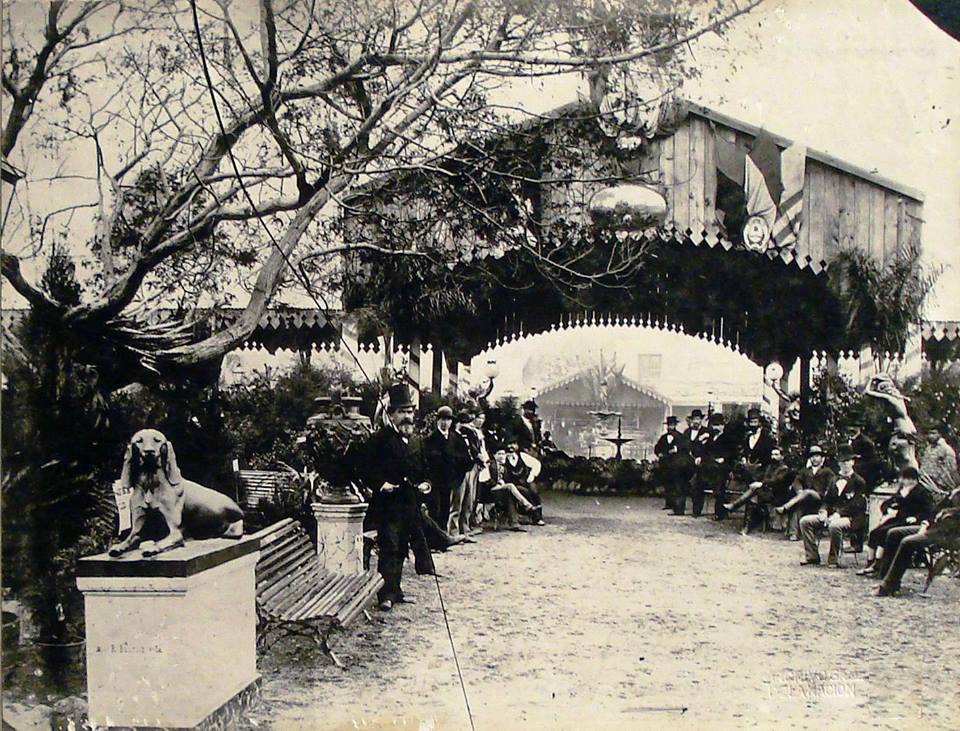
First Exposición Rural held in 1875, on the corner of Florida and Paraguay streets of Buenos Aires

Calls for the foundation of an economic society dedicated to fostering agricultural growth in Argentina, a country rich in prospective farmland, were commonplace among the Argentine elites as early as the 18th century during the colonial rule of the Viceroyalty of the Río de la Plata, and continued well into the 19th century following Argentina's independence from Spain. On 10 July 1866, one day after Argentina's 50th independence anniversary, a group of landowners led by Eduardo Olivera established the Sociedad Rural Argentina (SRA) to promote agricultural development. Its motto, "Cultivar el suelo es servir a la patria" ("To cultivate the soil is to serve the nation"), reflected its ideological alignment with agrarian elites. The SRA organized its first Exposición Rural on 11 April 1875, which became Argentina's premier agricultural fair and a significant regional event.

From its inception under President Bartolomé Mitre, the SRA represented large landowners and exerted direct and indirect influence over government policies. A pivotal moment was its involvement in the Conquest of the Desert (1878–1885), a military campaign led by President Nicolás Avellaneda to displace Indigenous communities from the Pampas and Patagonia regions, drastically expanding Argentina's agricultural frontier. The SRA financed the campaign through land bonds (4 pesos per hectare) and the government shared the SRA's vision that agricultural expansion (and, in particular, livestock farming) was the primary goal of the campaign. Key beneficiaries of the campaign included many of the SRA's most prominent members, such as the Martínez de Hoz, Anchorena, and Álzaga families, who acquired millions of productive hectares. José Martínez de Hoz, then SRA president, received 2.5 million hectares.

=== Political interventions throughout the 20th century ===
During the 1930 Exposición Rural, Agriculture Minister Juan B. Fleitas (who served under President Hipólito Yrigoyen) was heckled by crowds demanding Yrigoyen's overthrow. The incident, coupled with the disappearance of official vehicles, escalated tensions. Six days later, a military coup led by General José Félix Uriburu ousted Yrigoyen, with the SRA's hostility cited as a contributing factor. The SRA regained political influence in the successive governments of the Infamous Decade.

In 1944, the SRA opposed General Edelmiro Farrell's Estatuto del Peón Rural, which granted labor rights to rural workers. The SRA argued it would cause "social disorder" and likened labor relations to paternalistic hierarchies. Antagonistic relations remained during the subsequent governments of Juan Perón: the SRA supported the anti-Peronist Democratic Union and, in December 1945, organized a lockout to block the aguinaldo (year-end bonus) instituted by the Perón administration. This triggered a general strike, forcing a compromise to pay the bonus in installments.

In 1975, during the Isabel Perón government, the SRA co-founded the Asamblea Permanente de Entidades Gremiales Empresarias (APEGE) and launched an 11-day strike against the government, reducing crop planting and causing shortages. The strike, alongside APEGE's 1976 lockout, preceded the 24 March 1976 coup. In the aftermath, José Alfredo Martínez de Hoz was appointed minister of economy and SRA secretary Jorge Zorreguieta named secretary of agriculture by the National Reorganization Process dictatorship. Pro-agribusiness measures adopted by Martínez de Hoz at the helm of the economy ministry included the repealing of the Estatuto del Peón Rural in 1980.

Following the return of democracy in 1983, the SRA adopted an antagonistic posture against the newly democratically-elected president Raúl Alfonsín. Alfonsín was booed at the SRA's 101st Exposición in 1988, denounced the hostility as "fascist," and left without inaugurating the event.

=== 21st century ===
During the Kirchner administrations (2003–2015), the SRA clashed with the government and aligned social movements, positioning itself as a leading opposition force. In 2008, the SRA led the Mesa de Enlace, allied with other agrarian groups, in a 129-day strike against export taxes projected by President Cristina Fernández de Kirchner. Roadblocks and port disruptions forced the repeal of Resolution 125 after Vice President Julio Cobos cast a tiebreaking Senate vote against it.

== La Rural fair ==
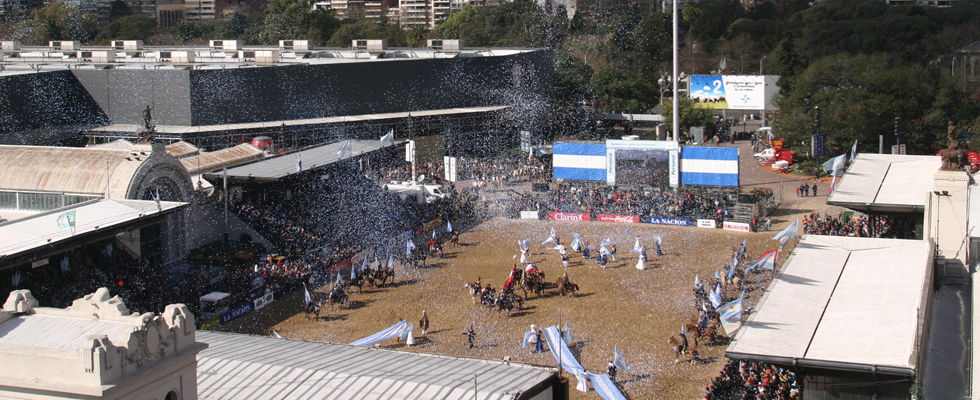
La Rural fairgrounds in 2006

The Sociedad Rural's main facility is located in the Palermo district of Buenos Aires, adjacent to Plaza Italia. This property, formally designated as the "Predio Ferial de Buenos Aires" but commonly called La Rural, has served as the organization's main fairgrounds since the late 19th century.

Since 1875, the SRA has organized the Exposición de Ganadería, Agricultura e Industria Internacional (commonly known as the Exposición Rural) at this location. This annual event functions as a trade exhibition focusing on agricultural production, livestock breeding, and related industrial sectors. With intermittent interruptions, it has maintained continuity as one of Argentina's longest-running industry exhibitions.

The La Rural complex comprises approximately 12 hectares of exhibition space, including pavilions and open-air facilities. Beyond its agricultural functions, the venue hosts various commercial and cultural events throughout the year, such as the annual Buenos Aires International Book Fair.

== List of presidents ==
1. Toribio Martínez de Hoz (1866–1870)
2. Eduardo Olivera (1870–1874)
3. José María Jurado (1874–1876)
4. Emilio Duportal (1876–1878)
5. José María Jurado (1878–1880)
6. Enrique Sundblad (1880–1882)
7. Leonardo Pereyra (1882–1884)
8. Enrique Sundblad (1884–1886)
9. José María Jurado (1886–1888)
10. Estanislao Zeballos (1888–1891)
11. José María Jurado (1891–1892)
12. Estanislao Zeballos (1892–1894)
13. Julio Pueyrredón (1896–1897)
14. Ramón Santamarina II (1897–1898)
15. Julián Frers (1898–1900)
16. Ezequiel Ramos Mexía (1900–1904)
17. Carlos María Casares (1904–1906)
18. Manuel Güiraldes (1906–1908)
19. Emilio Frers (1908–1910)
20. José María Malbrán (1910–1912)
21. Abel Bengolea (1912–1916)
22. Joaquín Samuel de Anchorena (1916–1922)
23. Pedro Pagés (1922–1926)
24. Luis Duhau (1926–1928)
25. Federico Martínez de Hoz (1928–1931)
26. Horacio Bruzone (1931–1934)
27. Cosme Massini Ezcurra (1934–1938)
28. Adolfo Bioy Domecq (1938–1942)
29. José María Bustillo II (1942–1946)
30. José Alfredo Martínez de Hoz I (1946–1950)
31. Enrique Frers (1950–1954)
32. Juan María Mathet (1954–1955)
33. Juan José Blaquier (1955–1956)
34. Juan María Mathet (1956–1960)
35. Faustino Alberto Fano (1960–1966)
36. José María Lartirigoyen (1966–1967)
37. Luis Firpo Miró (1967–1972)
38. Celedonio Pereda (1972–1978)
39. Juan Antonio Pirán (1978–1980)
40. Horacio F. Gutiérrez (1980–1984)
41. Guillermo Alchouron (1984–1990)
42. Eduardo Zavalía (1990–1994)
43. Enrique Crotto (1994–2002)
44. Luciano Miguens (2002–2008)
45. Hugo Biolcati (2008–2012)
46. Luis Miguel Etchevehere (2012–2017)
47. Daniel Pelegrina (2017–2021)
48. Nicolás Pino (2021–incumbent)

== Criminal case for embezzlement and undervalued sale of the property ==
The case is a derivation of another in which federal judge Sergio Torres is investigating former president Carlos Menem and other defendants for having sold a property worth more than 100 million dollars for only 30 million. Directors of the Sociedad Rural Argentina and executives of the Banco de la Provincia de Buenos Aires were also charged with “peculado” in connection with an uncollectible loan of 106 million dollars granted by Banco Provincia.

== Bibliography ==
- Cuccorese, Horacio Juan (1960). "Historia sobre los orígenes de la Sociedad Rural Argentina" [History on the origins of the Sociedad Rural Argentina]. Humanidades (in Spanish) (35). National University of La Plata: 23-54.

== See also ==
- Economy of Argentina
  - Agriculture of Argentina
  - Argentine beef
- 2008 Argentine agrarian strike
- Generation of '80
- Federación Agraria Argentina
