= Orquesta Típica (film) =

- Directed by: Nicolas Entel
- Produced by: Red Creek
- Release date: 2005
- Running time: 80 minutes
- Country: Argentina
- Language: Spanish

Orquesta Tipica (Tango or Death) is a 2005 Argentine documentary film that tells the story of a tango orchestra which travels the world playing traditional Argentine music.

Nicolas Entel directed the film, which was mostly shot in Buenos Aires, though he filmed the Orquesta Típica Fernández Fierro during their first European Tour through the Netherlands, Germany, Switzerland and Italy. He also filmed the group during a mini tour in Uruguay. By the beginning of 2004 the filming was finished and Nicolas Entel, together with the editor Pablo Farina, spent eight months in offline editing.

The film appeared in theatres in Argentina and it won the Audience Award in the Beverly Hills Festival in 2006. It was selected to open the Saint Paul, Minnesota Wild River Music Film Festival in September, 2006.

Also, presented in the Tandil Week of Cinema, Urban Tango Festival in Barcelona, Turks & Caicos International Film Festival, San Rafael Film Festival and Boston Latin International Film Festival, among others.

== Awards ==
- Audience Award. Beverly Hills Film Festival 2006.
