= 2006 Argentine truckers' boycott of Chinese store-owners =

In June 2006, the truckers union of Argentina boycotted supermarkets owned by Chinese people in retaliation for the attack of a trucker by a store-owner.

The incident in question was triggered by an argument between the people in charge of the supermarket and those in charge of delivering Quilmes beer in a neighborhood of Lomas de Zamora, Buenos Aires, possibly over discrepancies in the number of empty bottles to be returned in exchange for the new ones. The owner of the supermarket and the manager, Zhen Benjing, refused to return a number of empty bottles, and a violent argument ensued between them and the crew of the delivery truck, Luis Gutiérrez and Ariel Luque. The owner attacked Luque with an empty bottle. Zhen then shot Luque with a handgun, puncturing one of his lungs. Luque had to be hospitalized in grave condition. The owner was arrested, but Zhen fled the scene.

Although by far the gravest, this was not the only incident of this kind. Chinese store-owners had been beaten by deliverers, and both truck drivers and deliverers were denouncing threats. Reasons mentioned by both sides were various, from instances of bad treatment to dubious commercial practices, worsened by linguistic problems.

On 15 June 2006, two weeks after the attack on Luque, about 1,000 people of the truckers' union demonstrated before the building of the Chamber of Stores and Supermarkets Owned by Chinese Residents (in Spanish, CASRECH) in Buenos Aires City. Union leader Pablo Moyano (son of CGT leader Hugo Moyano) met Miguel Ángel Calvete, president of the Chamber, but got no reply to their demands of reparations for Luque and security guarantees.

On 21 June 2006, the truckers' union started a nationwide boycott on Chinese-owned stores, cutting the delivery of goods to them. This soon caused noticeable shortage of goods in the targeted stores, which affected especially the Greater Buenos Aires area. "Chinese supermarkets", as they are known, commonly sell at lower prices than their competitors and tend towards lower-class neighborhoods. There are about 2,250 of these supermarkets in the metropolitan area of Buenos Aires (and 1,600 in the rest of the country), and according to marketing firm ACNielsen they command 35% of the food commercialization market.

As the boycott continued, CASRECH threatened to file an accusation against the union for violating the Supply Law, which would make the boycott (taken as a strike) illegal. A private person sued Pablo Moyano and union deputy Carlos Ayala, alleging racial discrimination.

On 23 June 2006, the union took the further step of blockading a La Serenísma dairy processing plant to prevent the company's trucks from delivering products to the boycotted stores.

On 26 June 2006, union representatives and members of CASRECH met at the Casa Rosada, invited by the national government. Interior Minister Aníbal Fernández acted as a mediator. The parties agreed on providing economical assistance to the injured trucker, Ariel Luque, on collaborating and overseeing the investigation of the attack in order to find and arrest the shooter (who was still missing), and on having Spanish-speaking staff to manage the reception of goods in the supermarkets. The boycott was then lifted by midnight 27 June 2006.
