= Hilton Quota =

The Hilton Quota is the informal name of the Tariff Quota now regulated by the Commission Regulation (EU) No 593/2013 for the European Union.

== Beef supplies ==
It consists of a quota of 58,100 tonnes of high-quality fresh, chilled and frozen beef. The suppliers are Argentina, Brazil, Uruguay, Paraguay, United States, Canada, Australia and New Zealand. The Hilton Quota beef enjoys a duty preference vis-à-vis the European Union Most Favoured Nation import regime. The quota is also nicknamed "Rump and Loin".

== History ==
The Hilton Quota originated as part of the GATT agreements in 1979, during the Tokyo Round, organised by and held at the Hilton Hotels in Tokyo (the name of the hotel chain was used to name the specific agreements on the beef quota).

== See also ==
- Argentine beef
