= Sebastián Marroquín =

Colombian architect and author, son of Pablo Escobar

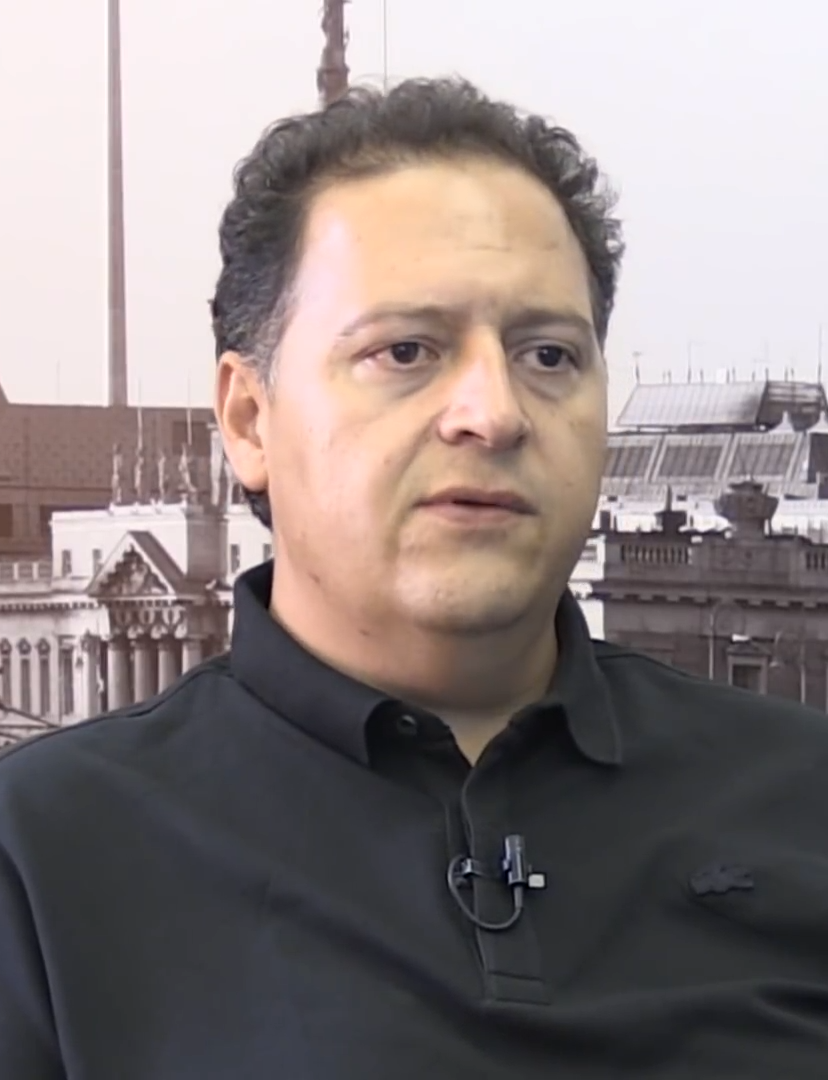
- Sebastián Marroquín in 2019
- Born: Juan Pablo Escobar Henao; 24 February 1977 (age 49); Medellín, Antioquia, Colombia
- Education: Instituto ORT; Universidad de Palermo
- Occupations: Architect; author
- Known for: Being the son of Pablo Escobar
- Notable work: Pablo Escobar: Mi padre (2014); Sins of My Father (2009)
- Children: 1
- Parent(s): Victoria Eugenia Henao; Pablo Escobar
- Awards: Golden Book Awards

Juan Sebastián Marroquín Santos (born Juan Pablo Escobar Henao; 24 February 1977) is a Colombian architect, author, and the son of Colombian drug lord Pablo Escobar.

== Life ==
After the death of Pablo Escobar in 1993, Juan Pablo Escobar Henao, his mother, and his sister Manuela Escobar first fled to Mozambique, then traveled on tourist visas to Argentina, where they ultimately remained and became citizens in exile from their native Colombia. Juan Pablo chose the name "Sebastián Marroquín" from the telephone book and adopted it as his new name since he needed a new identity, stating in an interview with Skavlan that airlines refused to sell to him under the Escobar name.

Although he and his family continue to make money on the rights to Pablo Escobar's name and likeness (such as selling clothing bearing his likeness for extra income), and have tried three times (unsuccessfully) to register Escobar's name as a brand, Marroquín prefers not to be linked with his father because as he said in one of the interviews that after his death no one was helping them; they also faced death threats, so they had to change their names to escape from there. He is also determined to dissociate himself from the Medellín Cartel and the illegal drug trade in Colombia.

Marroquín graduated from college with a degree in architecture. He now lives in Palermo Soho, Buenos Aires with his wife and son, and works as an architect. He has since met with some of his father's victims.

Marroquín has returned to Colombia twice for visits: to pay his respects at his father's grave. He was not allowed to enter Hacienda Nápoles for a return visit to Escobar's 20-square-kilometre (7.7 sq mi) estate 180 kilometres (110 mi) east of Medellin, confiscated by the Colombian government after Escobar's death and now managed by the municipality of Puerto Triunfo as a public park, campground, and museum of Escobar's crimes.

In May 2024 he appeared in a famous Serbian talk show Veče sa Ivanom Ivanovićem.

== Sins of My Father ==
Sins of My Father (2009), an Argentine movie documentary five years in the making, "followed Marroquín as he apologized to the sons of victims his late father ordered assassinated during a decade of terrorizing Colombia during his time as a major drug lord." The film promoted reconciliation and ending hatred.

== Pablo Escobar: My Father ==
Using his birth name, Juan Pablo Escobar, Marroquín authored the book Pablo Escobar: My Father (2014).

Following the murder of a Netflix location scout for the crime drama series Narcos in Temascalapa, Mexico, Marroquín stated: "Nothing has changed except the names. Now there's even more drug-trafficking and corruption."
