= CARBAP =

The Rural Associations' Confederation of Buenos Aires and La Pampa (Spanish: Confederación de Asociaciones Rurales de Buenos Aires y La Pampa), CARBAP, is an organization composed of 114 associations grouping some of the main 34,000 Argentine owners of land and farms in the most important agricultural region of the country, and therefore it is one of the main private interest business organizations, and a pressure group in that nation.

CARBAP was founded in 1932 and it is a part of the Argentine Rural Confederations (CRA).
