= Argentine beef =

Culinary ingredient

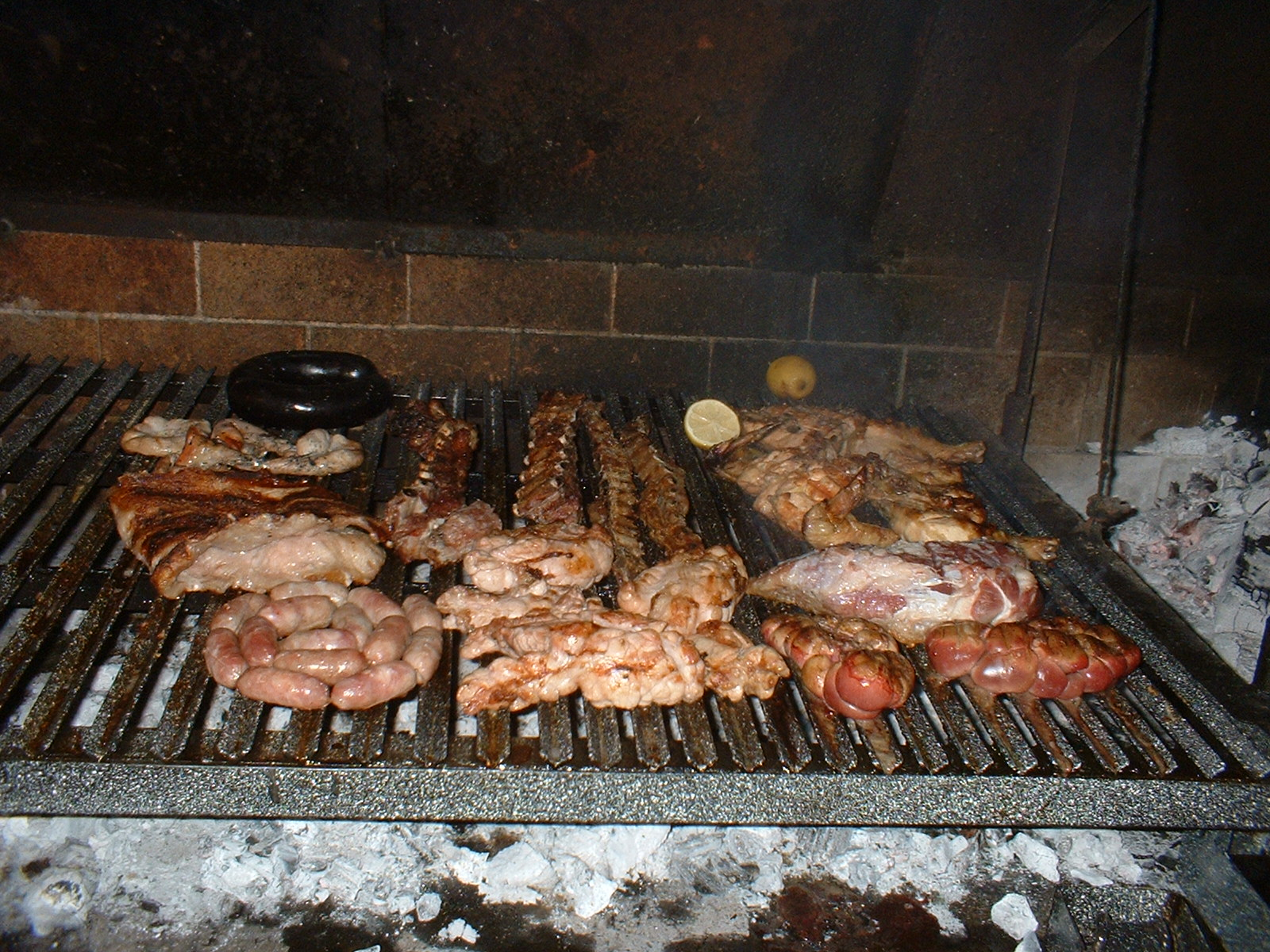
Asado in preparation.

Beef is a key component of traditional Argentine cuisine. Argentina has historically been a major beef producer and exporter. Argentina became a major exporter of beef, following innovations in transportation and refrigeration technologies in the 1880s. By the early 20th century, Argentina was the largest beef exporter in the world, accounting for more than half of global beef exports. In 2019, Argentina was the 4th largest producer of beef, with a production of 3 million tons (only behind the US, Brazil and China).

== History ==
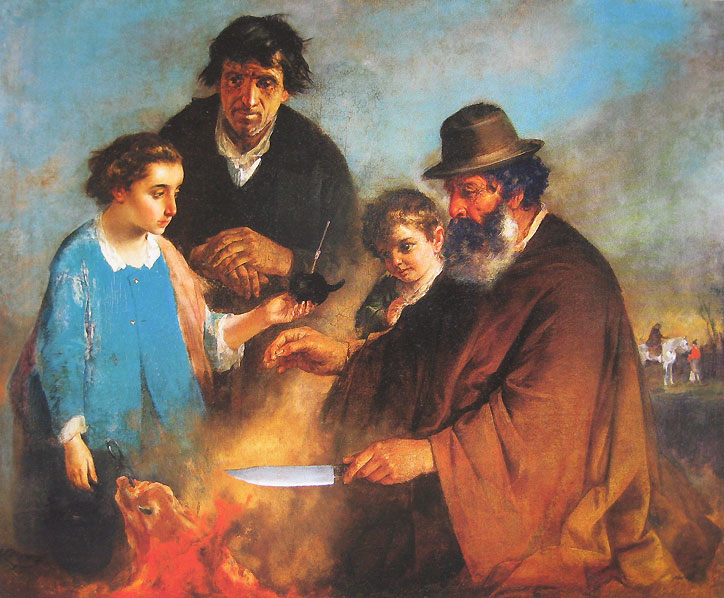
The Asado (1888) by Ignacio Manzoni. Asado is considered a national dish, and is typical of Argentine families to gather on Sundays around one.

Cattle were first brought to Argentina in 1536 by Spanish conquistadors. Due to the geography of the Pampas and a small national market, the cattle multiplied rapidly, with some contemporary observers describing the animals as a menace.

In 1785, British whalers established a beef-salting industry in Buenos Aires. The salted beef was sold on the domestic market as tasajo and exported to Europe in limited quantities. In the 19th century, Buenos Aires would develop into a cattle-processing complex of stockyards, warehouses, and meat-salting facilities. The Anchorena family of Basque immigrants were influential in the 19th century cattle industry in Argentina.

Railway building within Argentina and the invention of refrigerated trains and ships in the late 19th century made an export market and Argentina's beef export industry started to thrive. From 1864 to 1888, the number of cattle in Argentina increased from just over 10 million to nearly 23 million. Argentina exported 32, 300 tons of beef in 1876–1880, which increased to 34,400 in 1886–1890. The development of a strong beef export industry in Argentina took a long time to develop due to several factors, including the slow development of a refrigerated meat industry, competition from American beef producers, and low demand for animal foodstuffs in Europe. Argentina was a major exporter of live cattle and salted beef prior to the 1880s, but with innovations in production and transportation technologies that enabled the shipping of fresh meat globally, Argentine beef exports increased. The United Kingdom was the primary market for Argentine meat.

The flipped seasons between the Northern and Southern Hemispheres meant that Argentine beef came onto the market at a time of year when beef was less at hand in the Northern Hemisphere, which further lifted the potential export market in the United States and European markets.

Following the rising demand for high-quality beef, new breeds and selective crossbreeding have been developed.

Argentine beef and its production have played a major part in the culture of Argentina, from the asado to the history of the gauchos of the Pampas. Landowners became wealthy from beef production and export, and estancia owners built large houses, important buildings in Buenos Aires and elsewhere, and contributed to politics, philanthropy, and society. The agricultural show La Rural each winter in Buenos Aires became a major part of the social season since it started in 1886.

In Chile, heightened taxes for the import of Argentine cattle in 1905 led to the meat riots, one of the first massive protests in Santiago. The price of meat was kept artificially high by the government, by means of the combination of a special tariff applied to cattle imports from Argentina, to protect the domestic producers, and a runaway inflation. The riots lasted from October 22 until October 27, and between 200 and 250 people were killed over this period, while more than 500 were injured. The financial losses were staggering. This revolt emphasized that the social problems were far more serious than what the authorities believed.

By the end of World War I, Argentina was the world's leading beef exporter, accounting for more than half of global beef exports.

British and American companies were prevalent in the Argentine beef trade in the 19th and 20th century. In the aftermath of U.S. anti-trust prosecutions of the U.S. "beef trust", American meatpacking companies expanded to Argentina where they continued to engage in cartel behaviors.

=== Recent years ===
Argentina has the world's highest consumption rate of beef, with yearly consumption at 55 kg per person. USA and Brazil come in second and third places, with 38 and 37 kg per person respectively. In 2006, livestock farmers kept between 50 and 55 million head of cattle, mostly in the fertile pastures of the Pampas. The country is currently the third-largest beef exporter in the world after Brazil and Australia. The national government applies a 15% tax on beef exports and has applied further restrictions since March 2006 to keep domestic prices low.

On 8 March 2006, after unsuccessfully trying to control the rising prices of beef in the internal market (26% since the beginning of that year), the Argentine government banned beef exports for 180 days (with the exception of prearranged shipments and the Hilton quota). On 26 May, the ban was replaced by a quota, to be in force between June and November, equivalent to 40% of the amount of beef exported in the same period of 2005.

These measures met harsh criticism from livestock farmers, the meat processing industry, and the export sector; some analysts have said that it will be useless in the long term and harm Argentina's international image, besides causing large monetary losses. Other analysts have said it is the only adequate measure that deals with inflation and that the industry is the only one in Argentina profitable enough to sustain such a policy.

In May 2021, the government decided to ban beef export for a month except for the Hilton Quota. Prices of meat in Argentina increased faster than the inflation in recent years and the government would like to limit inflation as well as increasing supply for the domestic market. From June on, it then slightly opened up the market again to Chile, Colombia or Israel but kept restrictions for the rest of 2021.

== Foot-and-mouth disease crisis ==
Argentina's cattle industry had become a key growth driver in the economy, with Argentina ranking fourth in cow meat exports. Thus, it was crushing news when new cases of foot-and-mouth disease (FMD) were found in 2001, for the first time in 60 years. Although FMD is usually harmless to people, the virus is easily spread between animals, making the slaughter of sick animals necessary. Argentine beef was banned by more than 60 countries, including the United States and Canada.

After an aggressive vaccination programme, the Office International des Epizooties said in 2003 that Argentina had regained "foot-and-mouth free with vaccination" status. A few years later, new cases of FMD were discovered in a herd of cattle in a northern province of Argentina. As a result, Chile banned the import of Argentine meat.

== Labeling ==
Food safety or quality labels are rarely used in Argentina, and a major initiative has been called for on this issue. There is no label certified by the government. The unsatisfactory situation concerning food safety becomes immediately clear by looking at the fact that the Argentine National Inspection Services audited and approved only 35 slaughterhouses in 2003 on Good Manufacturing Practices and Hazard Analysis and Critical Control Point (HACCP).

However, farmers as well as the export industry started to realize that there is a steadily increasing demand for safer and more reliable brands. To meet customer expectations, several initiatives have been taken. There are certificates handed out by private organizations, such as breed associations. For instance, the Argentine Angus Association established a Carne Angus Certificada to ensure that only meat coming from an Angus is described as Angus. Furthermore, the association supports other certificates like the Ternero Angus Certificado.

Besides the breed associations, different pilot projects have been initiated. The Pampas Del Salado project is an example of these; its approach has been to ear-tag calves in order to assure their origin and quality. However, most of those projects have only scant participation; certificates and labels will only gain reputation and acceptance among consumers only if there is a sufficiently large percentage of producers participating.

== Promotion of Argentine beef ==
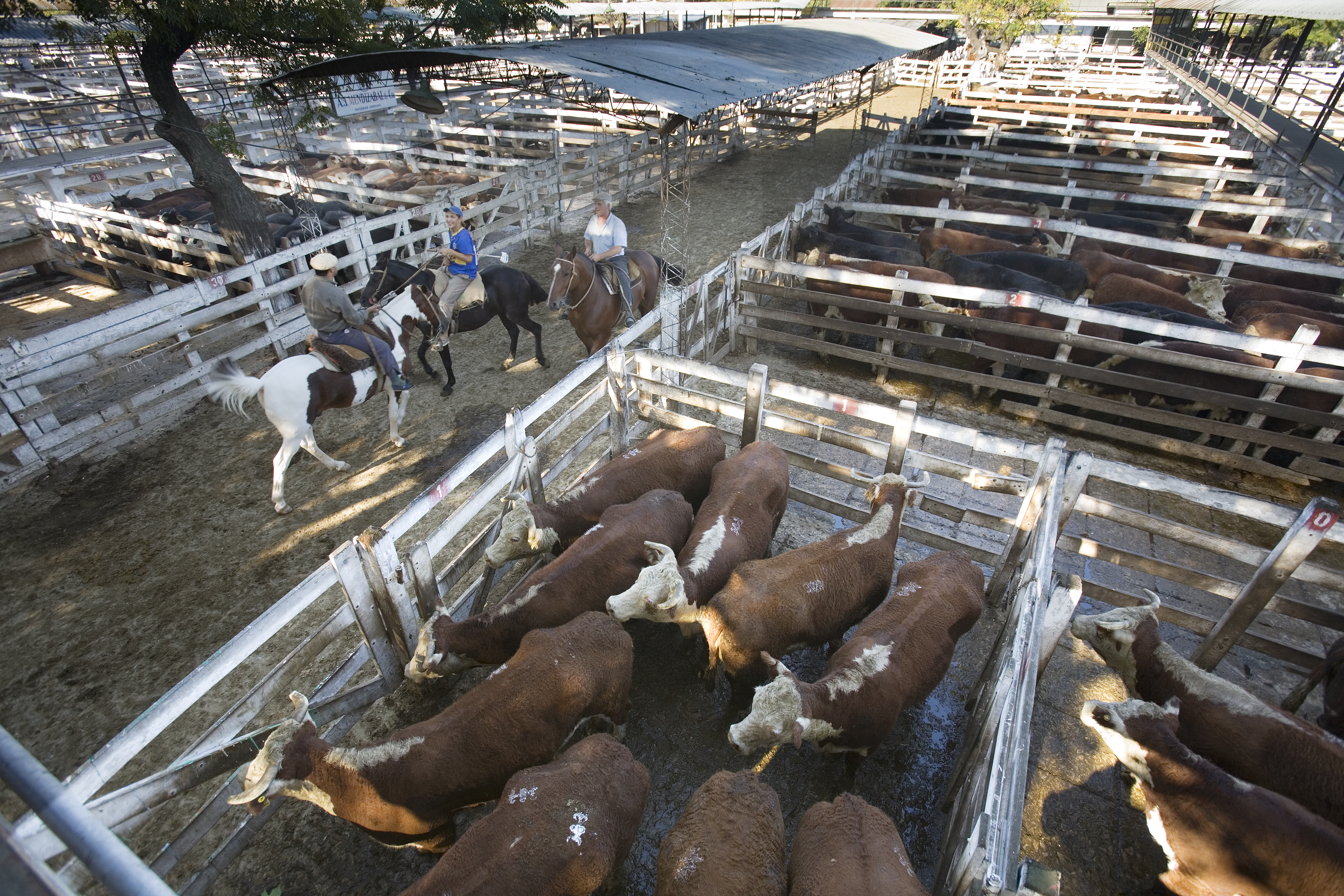
A cattle yard in Buenos Aires.

To increase sales in foreign countries and to improve the production and reliability of beef produced in Argentina, a public nongovernmental organization, the Instituto de Promoción de la Carne Vacuna Argentina— the Argentine Beef Promotion Institute (IPCVA) was founded in December 2001. Furthermore, the IPCVA is also concerned with promotional work in Argentina itself.

=== International and national promotion ===
Several activities have been undertaken to make Argentine beef better known in the world:

- The IPCVA participated in the International Food and Drink Exhibition held in London in March.
- An Argentine Beef Festival was arranged last February in Helsinki, Finland. To promote the product, a big banquet was held at the Helsinki Oasis Hotel with the Argentine ambassador.
- Representatives of the IPCVA traveled to Washington, DC, to negotiate a special contract to ease export of Argentine beef to the North American market.
- Qualitative soundings are being developed in the main cities of the European Union to better know consumers' preferences to design specific promotion campaigns.

However, with the export restrictions for beef set by the Argentine government, these measures may be of little use. Therefore, the IPCVA also focuses on promotion work in Argentina:

- The IPCVA is developing the first beef consumption map in Argentina. Through complete research of the domestic market, an "X-Ray" of the beef consumption in the whole country will be set up and used for marketing and promotion purposes
- "Las Leonas' Secret"—Las Leonas, the Argentine women's field hockey team, has a contract with the IPCVA to eat Argentine beef. This prestigious sport is seen as key to promoting the meat, especially because prestige is one of the key factors of the Argentine beef image.

=== Funding of the IPCVA ===
These huge promotions are expensive. Therefore, the IPCVA arranged to get the following contributions for its budget:

- 1.25 Argentine pesos from producers per killed animal
- 0.55 Argentine pesos from packers per packed animal

This adds up to 1.80 Argentine pesos per slaughtered animal. At a killing rate of 13 million animals per year, it totals 23,400,000 Argentine pesos. This is a budget of around €6,325,000 per year (March 28, 2006).

=== Goals of the IPCVA ===
The long-term goals of the IPCVA are described as follows on their website:

- Identify and create demand for Argentine beef products in domestic and foreign markets.
- Design and develop marketing strategies to improve Argentine beef products' competitiveness overseas.
- Plan and develop promotion strategies to contribute to the improvement of domestic consumption levels.
- Work to consolidate Argentine beef quality and security, contributing to the efficiency of productive and industrial processes."

The IPCVA has become a major instrument to improve the international competitiveness of Argentine beef.

== Statistics ==
Statistics for Argentine beef production and exports:

Gross domestic product of Argentina (PPP)	US$537 billion
GDP share of agriculture	10.5%
Total revenue on beef	US$5 billion
Beef export revenue	US$500–700 million
Percentage of beef exports over total Argentine exports	3%
Percentage of worldwide beef exports	7.36%
Total slaughter	13 million head/year
Beef production	2.8 million tonnes/year
Consumption per capita	55 kg/person/year

Argentina annually produces about two 240-gram steaks per person worldwide and has six steaks more standing on its pastures.

== Domestic market and export ==
The high consumption per capita shows that beef is profoundly integrated into traditional Argentine cuisine. However, as can be seen, beef exports are not an essential part of the Argentine economy. This is in large part because Argentina consumes most of its beef and the industry has been prevented from orienting itself to an export industry. Secondary reasons include the restrictive rules and regulations on beef of importing countries. For instance, Argentina agreed with the United States on an annual restriction of 20,000 tons. While these rules were not always in place in previous years/decades, Argentina still has not become a massive exporter of beef, but an exporter nonetheless.

Even while beef exports are not fully developed for a larger contribution to the Argentine economy, Argentina has been a major player in the world beef market for many years, due in large part to the reputation of Argentine beef.

From 2006 to 2015, beef exports were restricted by quota. Mauricio Macri removed the restrictions when he became president of Argentina. Volume of beef exported substantially increased. In 2005, Argentina couldn't sell more than 700,000 metric tons outside the country. In 2015, only 200,000 metric tons was exported. In May 2021, the new government decided to ban export for a month, except for the Hilton Quota. It had exported 933,000 tons of meat in the 12 previous months before the ban. The country slightly opened its industry to export during 2021. The government proposed to continue restrictions in 2022.

China is the main client, buying 75% of beef exported from Argentina.

From 2016 to 2025, the United States imported $1.1 billion USD worth of beef products from Argentina.

== Cattle breeds ==
=== Shorthorn ===
Originally from northeast England, the shorthorn was introduced to Argentina in 1826 and was the first foreign breed to enter the country. As in many other countries, Argentina's selection was designated to produce not only meat but milk as well.

Nowadays, Argentina's Shorthorn breed has been bred to greatly improve its meat quality thanks to hybridisation (crossbreeding) as has been demonstrated at the National Agropecuarian Technology Center.

Characteristics: considerable size; wide back and forequarters. A couple of centuries ago, they used to lack symmetry and uniformity.

=== Hereford ===
Produced with the objective of responding to England's food market expansion during Britain's industrial revolution the Hereford is known for its high yield of beef. It was first introduced to Argentina in 1858, and is characterized by its juice and flavor consistency. Just as the Argentina's Shorthorn has evolved, so did the Argentine Hereford through crossbreeding with local breeds.

Characteristics: high yield of beef; wide back; early maturity; rustling ability and hardiness.

=== Aberdeen Angus ===
Originally from Scotland, the Aberdeen Angus were first introduced to Argentina by Don Carlos Guerrero in 1879. They are generally found in temperate climates. Instead of focusing on crossbreeding in order to strength their qualities, Argentine farmers decided to focus on a purebred evolution based on natural and high-quality nutrition.

Characteristics: maternal skills; highly fertile; growth capacity; climate adaptation; thin skin; short and smooth hair.

=== Holando-Argentina ===
Derived from the Holstein, it was first introduced from the Netherlands in 1880, to the fertile regions of the Pampas, and devoted to the production of both beef and milk.

=== Zebu ===
Originally from India, the Zebu is an animal used for pulling loads. Many different breeds can be found spread over the world since they were crossbred in order to pass on their tolerance to hot weather and strength.

Characteristics: light colored; clear hump between the shoulders; large horns; hot climate and insect tolerance.

=== Charolais ===
Brought to Argentina around 1910, the Charolais breed is originally from Burgundy, France. Focusing on size and strength, farmers paid little attention to their quality of meat and therefore to refinement. Characteristics: wide opened and round horns; long and tall; projecting shoulders and deep hips.

== Recipes with Argentine beef ==
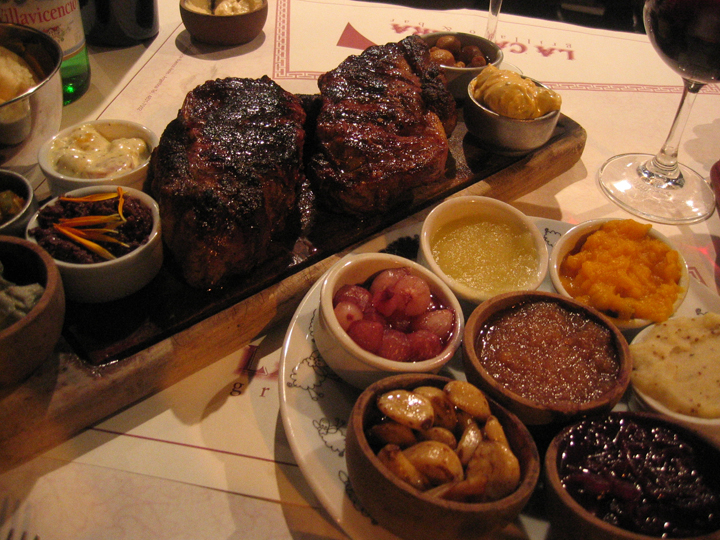
Argentine bife de chorizo.

Beef is traditionally cooked over charcoal flame (as an asado) and served often as part of a wider selection of grilled meat, with chimichurri as a relish.

== See also ==
- Agriculture in Argentina
