= La Rural =

Annual agricultural show in Buenos Aires, Argentina

Coordinates: 34°34′43″S 58°25′15.1″W

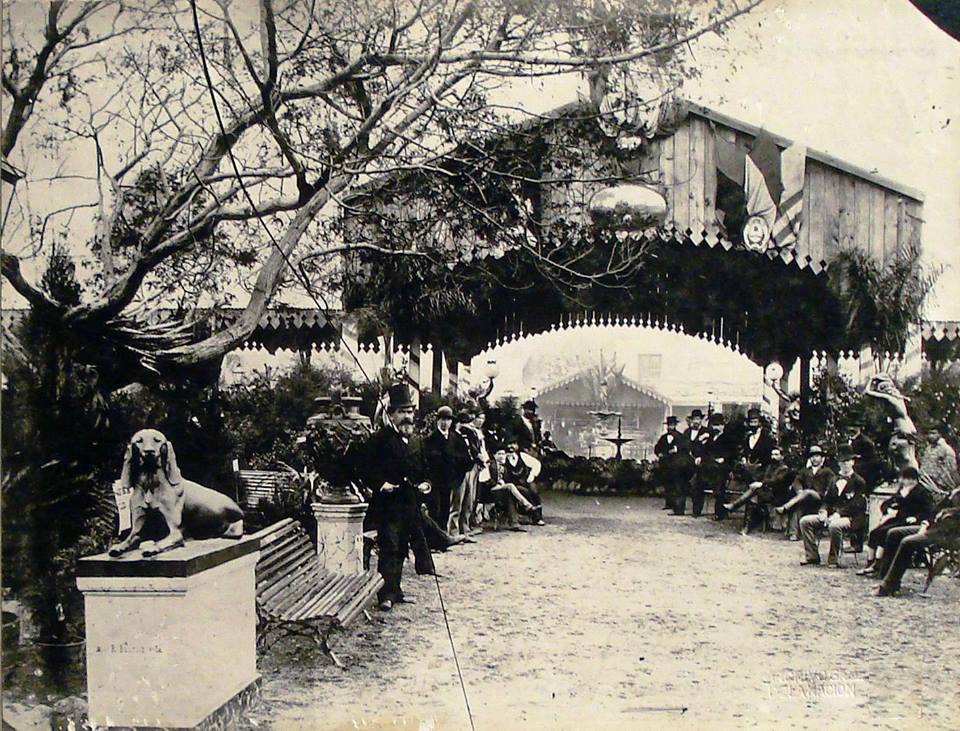
The first Rural Exhibition held in Buenos Aires, 1875.

La Exposición Rural (in English: The Rural Exhibition), is an annual agricultural and livestock show held in the Palermo section of Buenos Aires, Argentina. The event is organized by the Sociedad Rural Argentina and both the exhibition and the society are known locally as La Rural. The exhibition has taken place in the society's Santa Fe Avenue exhibition centre and fairground, each year in July since its inaugural event in 1875. The Society was founded by Eduardo Olivera and José Martínez de Hoz with the motto 'To cultivate the soil is to serve the country', and was formerly known as 'El Solar de Palermo'. Built in the 1870s, the Society's showground features a Belle Epoque stadium and a modern exhibition hall. During the rest of the year, the exhibition hall is used for other events including trade shows. The Opera Pampa organizes shows in the stadium, showcasing the history of Argentina with zamba dances and an asado in the dining rooms. With over 10,000 members, the Society has branch offices in many parts of the country.

Primarily a farming show, breeders arrive from all over the country to exhibit their livestock, particularly cattle at La Rural. It has become a major feature of the porteño social scene in prosperous Argentina, taking place in Buenos Aires' most exclusive neighbourhood and accompanied by balls and other events. However, with the onset of the country's economic crisis towards the end of the 20th century, the event lost some of its vitality, although it is still popular with visitors. In 2005, 715,000 people visited the exhibition, which had almost 400 stands and 4,000 animals. It is considered to be one of the most important and traditional events for Argentinean agriculture. Additionally, throughout the years La Rural has become a space for important negotiation and business within the agro-indisutrial community, having strong presences of agriculture, industry, trade and education. It has served as the meeting point for producers, contractors, business owners, professionals, students, and experts from Argentina and around the world.

== Pavilions ==
La Rural fairgrounds contains many different types of pavilions to showcase livestock or other vendors. Along with the pavilions, the Convention Center helps host the 4 million visitors and more than 300 events per year. This is the leading venue both nationally and largest in Latin America for hosting of fairs, congresses, and events.

=== Horse Pavilion + Central Track ===
The Central Track pavilion is the icon of the Rural Fairgrounds. It is in the center of the fairgrounds and contains the central track, grandstands, and equine pavilions. It is the main stage for the Rural Exhibition, and has held more than 120 editions. It holds 3,000 people and is the ideal space for outdoor events such as La Rural, sporting events, fairs, and other social events.

The Horse Pavilion is constructed of both the Emilio Solanet Pavilion on the left and the Jose Alfredo Martinez de Hoz Pavilion located on the right of the grounds. The Emilio Solanet Pavilion is dedicated to specifically exhibit Argentine Creoles horses. This is a declared Historical Heritage space, and stands out for its rustic structure inside and an outside with the best decorations and ornaments.

The Jose Alfredo Martinez de Hoz Pavilion is historically used to house other equine breeds such as the Argentine Polo ponies and horses, Silla or Anglo Argentino, Career Pure Blood, and more.

=== Convention Center ===
La rural has this convention center pavilion for development of different national and international congresses. The space changes for event different type of meeting.

=== Restaurante "El Central" ===
In 1910 this pavilion was constructed in commemoration of the centennial anniversary of the la Revolución de Mayo or May Revolution which marked the beginning of Argentinian independence. This is one of the most traditional spaces of the property and is in the French style. It is known for its grand emblematic and architectural value as well as integrating a section of the building declared a National heritage site. It is used for social events, weddings, and birthday celebrations.

=== Pavilion Frers ===
Pavilion Frers is located next to the Plaza Italia, and combines academic-French Influence with industrial characteristics. This Pavilion was also constructed in 1910 and has a blend of elegance and history. This is another versatile space, and since the 1990s has become the International Pavilion.

=== Yellow, Green, Blue, and Ocher Pavilions ===
These pavilions are other versatile spaces throughout the fairgrounds to hold different events and celebrations.

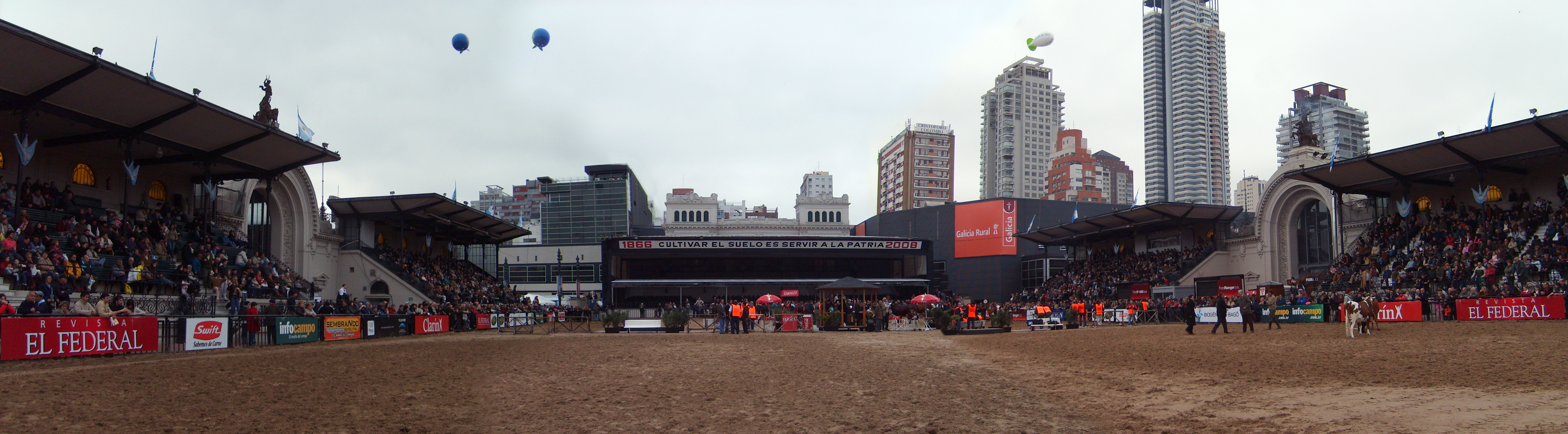
Panoramic view of the Rural Exhibition
