= Senate of Santa Fe =

Senate of Santa Fe Cámara de Senadores de la Provincia de Santa Fe

Type
- Type: Upper house of the Legislature of Santa Fe

Leadership
- President: Vacant, - since 9 December 2025
- Provisional President: Felipe Enrique Michlig, UCR/UpCSF since 10 December 2023

Structure
- Seats: 19
- Political groups: Government (13): United to Change Santa Fe (28); Opposition (6): Let's Advance Together (5); Unite for Liberty and Dignity (1)

Elections
- Last election: 10 September 2023

Meeting place
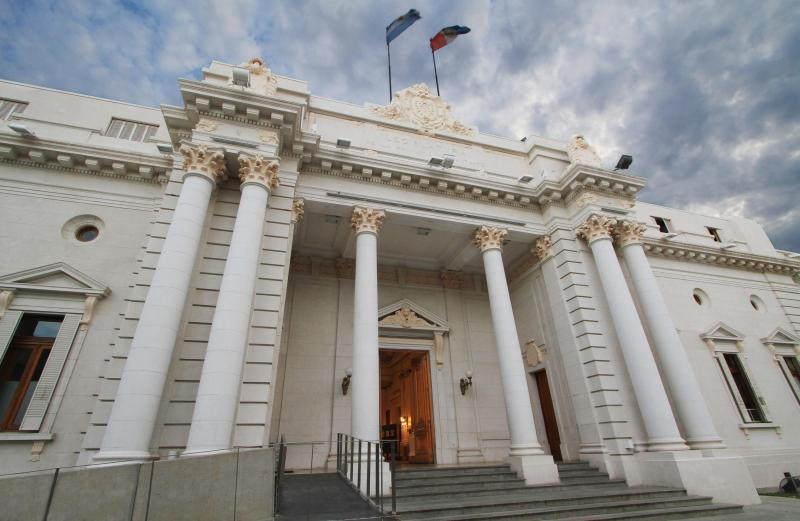
- Legislative Palace of the Province of Santa Fe; Santa Fe, Argentina

Website
- https://senadosantafe.gov.ar/web/

The Chamber of Senators of Santa Fe Province (Spanish: Cámara de Senadores de la Provincia de Santa Fe) is the upper house of the Legislature of Santa Fe Province, the third most populous of Argentina's provinces.

The entirety of its members are renewed every four years alongside the governor and the Chamber of Deputies, the lower house of the provincial legislature. It is made up of 19 senators who represent each of the province's 19 departments, each elected using the first-past-the-post system.

== History ==
The first legislative body of Santa Fe Province was established in 1819 with the provincial statute, which granted attributions to the Cabildo de Santa Fe. A unicameral legislature, composed of 16 members, was established later on by the Constitution of Santa Fe of 1856.

A constitutional reform passed in 1872 during the governorship of Simón de Iriondo divided the legislature into an upper house, the Senate, and a lower house, the Chamber of Deputies, taking after the National Congress of Argentina.

== Seat ==
Alongside the Chamber of Deputies, the Senate convenes in the former Customs building in the provincial capital of Santa Fe de la Vera Cruz.

== List of presidents ==
The Senate is chaired by the vice governor of the province, who is elected alongside the governor every four years. The Vice Governor may only cast tie-breaking votes (according to article 39 of the provincial constitution). The following is a list of vice governors of Buenos Aires since the return of democracy in 1983.

President	Party	Term start	Term end	Governor
Carlos Aurelio Martínez	PJ	11 December 1983	11 December 1987	José María Vernet
Antonio Vanrell	PJ	11 December 1987	11 December 1991	Víctor Reviglio
Miguel Ángel Robles	PJ	11 December 1991	11 December 1995	Carlos Reutemann
Gualberto Venesia	PJ	11 December 1995	11 December 1999	Jorge Obeid
Marcelo Muniagurria	PJ	11 December 1999	11 December 2003	Carlos Reutemann
María Eugenia Bielsa	PJ	11 December 2003	11 December 2007	Jorge Obeid
Griselda Tessio	UCR–FPCyS	11 December 2007	11 December 2011	Hermes Binner
Jorge Henn	UCR–FPCyS	11 December 2011	11 December 2015	Antonio Bonfatti
Carlos Fascendini	UCR–FPCyS	11 December 2015	11 December 2019	Miguel Lifschitz
Alejandra Rodenas	PJ	11 December 2019	11 December 2023	Omar Perotti
Gisela Scaglia	PRO–UpCSF	11 December 2019	11 December 2023	Maximiliano Pullaro
