= Constitution of Santa Fe =

Constitution of Santa Fe Province
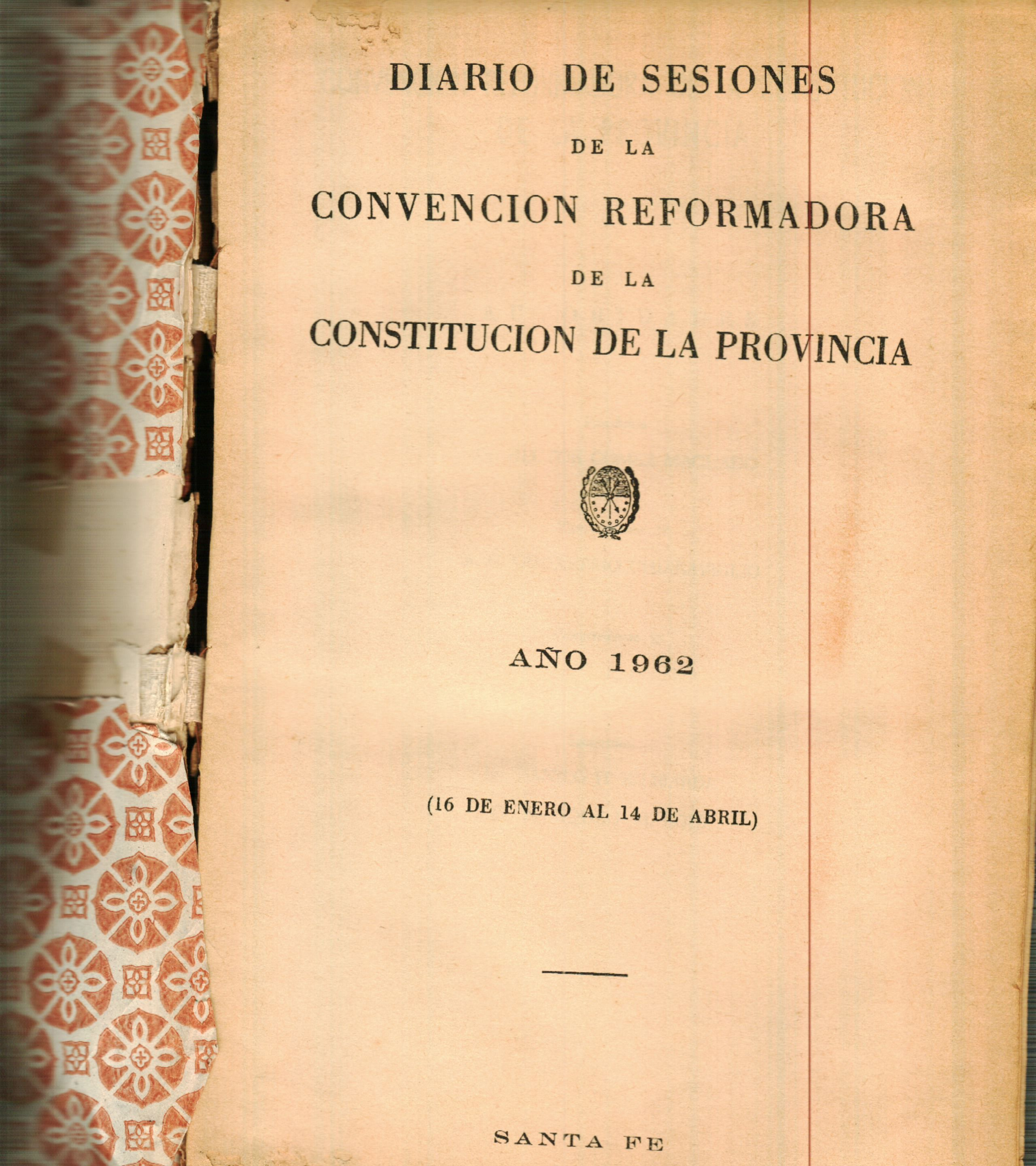
- Front page of the congressional record of the Constitution.

Overview
- Jurisdiction: Santa Fe Province, Argentina
- Created: May 25, 1856
- Ratified: April 14, 1962

Government structure
- Branches: 3
- Chambers: Bicameral
- Executive: Governor
- Judiciary: Supreme
- Location: General Archive of the Santa Fe Province, City of Santa Fe
- Media type: Parchment

Full text
- Constitution of Santa Fe at Wikisource

The Constitution of Santa Fe is the fundamental law of the Santa Fe Province, Argentina, enacted on April 14, 1962, which is based on the Argentine National Constitution and establishes the exercise of its institutions, ensuring the administration of justice, the municipal system and education.

== Overview ==
=== Preamble ===
The final approved text consists of a preamble and 116 articles, divided into ten sections. The Constitution of the Province begins with the following Preamble, which lists the general purposes of the Constitution.

Currently, the preamble to the Constitution is as follows:

"We, the representatives of the people of the Province of Santa Fe, assembled in Constitutional Convention for the purpose of organizing the public powers and consolidating democratic and republican institutions to ensure the fundamental rights of man; maintain internal peace; strengthen justice; stimulate and dignify labor; provide for education and culture; foster social cooperation and solidarity; promote the general welfare; encourage economic development under the banner of social justice; affirm the validity of federalism and the municipal system; and guarantee at all times the blessings of liberty for all inhabitants of the Province, invoking the protection of God, source of all reason and justice, enact this Constitution"

=== Section I: principles, rights, guarantees, and duties ===
Section One, entitled Principles, Rights, Guarantees, and Duties, consists of 28 articles. It defines the form of government in accordance with the country's democratic, representative, and republican principles, establishes the Catholic, Apostolic, and Roman religion, and designates the provincial government as having its seat in the City of Santa Fe, as stated in Articles 1, 3, and 4, respectively.

Article 6 affirms that all inhabitants of the province, whether nationals or foreigners, enjoy the same rights and guarantees recognized by the National Constitution. The State recognizes the dignity, freedom, and equality of every human being, the right to defend their rights and legitimate interests, and the individual personality of each person, and all bodies are obligated to respect it. The right to teach and learn, to freely express and disseminate one's thoughts through speech or writing, freedom of the press, freedom of religion, the right to a trade or profession, and the right to private property are among the rights guaranteed in the Province. Citizens also have duties toward the State and the community, including compliance with the law, which is necessary to ensure respect for the rights and freedoms of others and to satisfy the just demands of morality, public order, and the general welfare.

The province promotes the development and dissemination of culture, the comprehensive formation and defense of the family, the formation and support of private entities, the economic development and integration of the different areas within its territory, popular savings in all its forms, the rational use of land, the technological advancement of agricultural activity, the industrialization and marketing of regional products, the protection of the soil from degradation and erosion, and the safeguarding of native flora and fauna.

=== Section II: electoral system ===
Section Two is entitled Electoral System and consists of two articles. Article 29 defines an elector as any citizen who has reached the age of eighteen and is registered in the Provincial Civic Registry. Their vote is personal, equal, free, secret, and mandatory. Article 30 states that all citizens may have access to elected office under conditions of equality.

== History ==
=== Provincial statute of 1819 ===
On July 23, 1818, Estanislao López entered the city of Santa Fe and assumed the role of de facto governor, as Mariano Vera had been deposed by his former allies. López understood that the province needed a legal framework that would guarantee each inhabitant their rights and responsibilities, as well as establish their obligations within the socio-political sphere. He also recognized the need to define the obligations of the authorities and prevent discretion and arbitrariness in government actions.

Therefore, a statute was drafted, which was later approved on August 26, 1819, by the Santa Fe City Council. The statute established the representative republican system as the form of government. The fundamental clause was found in Article 19, which instituted, for the first time, direct popular vote for the election of the governor.

This was the first provincial constitution in Argentina, and the first Magna Carta signed in the country. This Statute of 1819 remained in effect until 1841, when the Assembly of Representatives of the Santa Fe Province enacted a new constitution for the province.

=== Constitution of 1841 ===
Following the death of Estanislao López on June 15, 1838, his secretary and right-hand man, Domingo Cullen, assumed power. Cullen made a pact with the French after being defeated by Juan Pablo López, forcing him to flee to Santiago del Estero, where he was temporarily protected by its governor. Under pressure from Rosas, he was sent in chains by the people of Santiago del Estero and executed by troops from Buenos Aires.

López quickly committed himself to a government loyal to the government of Buenos Aires. Therefore, he enacted a new Constitution on July 17, 1841, more modern in character, in the style of the other provinces, and also influenced by the national constitutions of 1819 and 1826. Both for its normative content and its formal structure, it is considered a major step forward. It was enacted through the intervention of the Assembly of Representatives, presided over by José de Amenábar.

== Debate on reform ==
For years, a possible reform of the 1962 provincial constitution was under discussion. During his term as governor of Santa Fe, the socialist Antonio Bonfatti showed his commitment to the issue, although he clarified that "we are not proposing or setting any deadlines.".

Eduardo Di Pollina, a socialist leader, stated that "Constitutional reform is a priority." However, from within the Radical Civic Union (UCR), his project was blocked and ultimately thwarted, ending his attempt to reform the provincial constitution, even though he had begun holding meetings among the parties to gather the necessary critical mass.

In 2016, Governor Miguel Lifschitz launched a citizen participation process called Bases for Reform, emphasizing the need to reform the existing Constitution of Santa Fe to reflect institutional advancements and the recognition of new rights and guarantees that had emerged over the past fifty years.

Bases for Reform brought together constitutional experts, civil society, and political actors through various participatory mechanisms, such as the Economic and Social Council, Social Forums, Local Authorities Roundtables, and a digital citizen participation platform.

In 2025, the Constitution was finally reformed, incorporating contributions from diverse sectors, including the Argentine Legislative Observatory (OLEGISAR). Civil society organizations and NGOs played a historic role in the 2025 constitutional reform of Santa Fe, representing approximately 23% of the more than 700 proposals received by the Reform Convention.
