= Maximiliano Pullaro =

Argentine politician

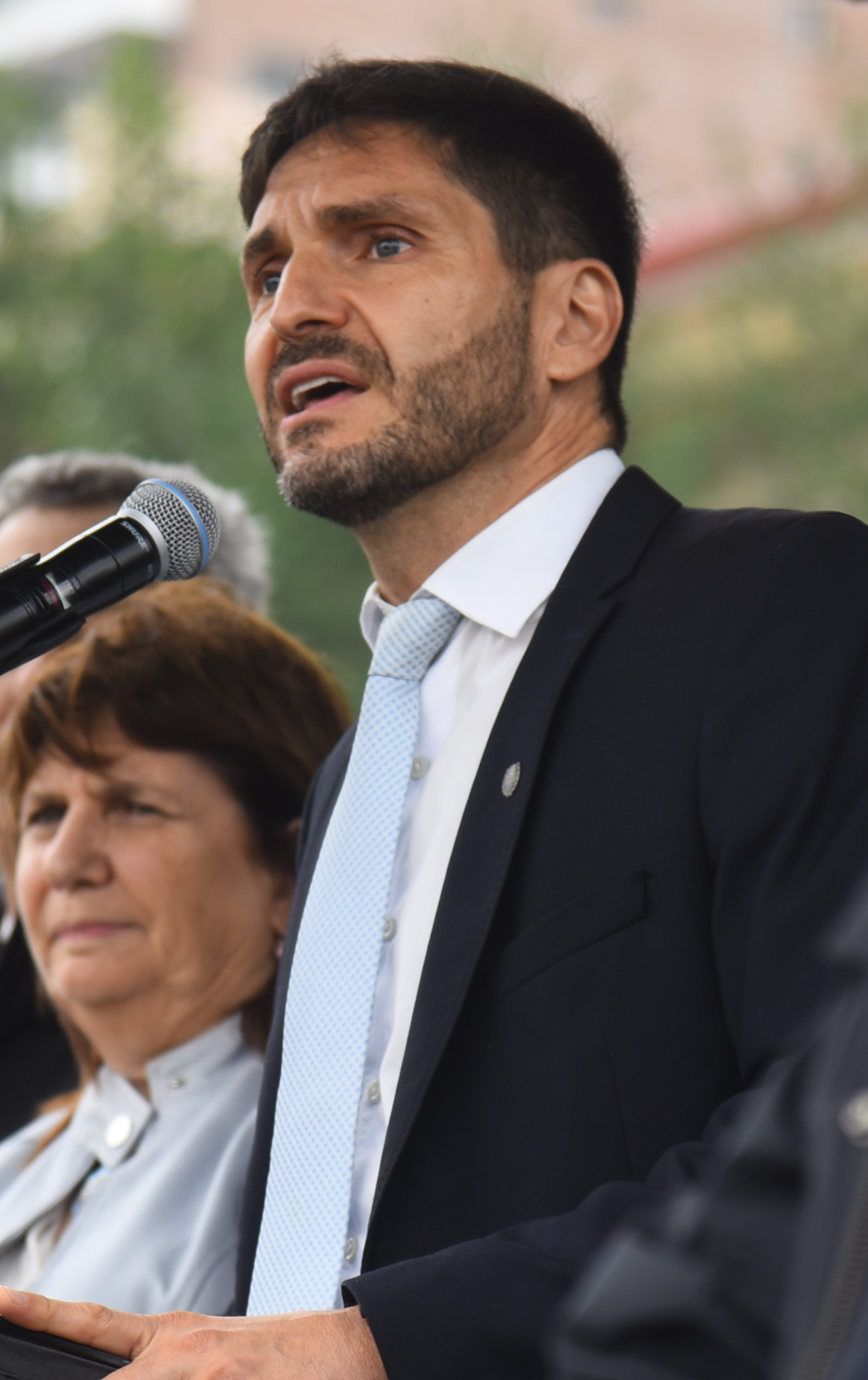

Governor of Santa Fe
- Incumbent
- Assumed office 10 December 2023
- Vice Governor: Gisela Scaglia (2023–2025); Vacant (2025–present)
- Preceded by: Omar Perotti

Provincial Deputy of Santa Fe
- In office 10 December 2019 – 10 December 2023
- In office 10 December 2011 – 10 December 2015

Minister of Security of Santa Fe
- In office 10 December 2015 – 10 December 2019
- Governor: Miguel Lifschitz
- Preceded by: Marcos Escajadillo
- Succeeded by: Marcelo Saín

Personal details
- Born: 6 December 1974 (age 51) Hughes, Argentina
- Party: Radical Civic Union
- Other political affiliations: Progressive, Civic and Social Front (2015–2021); Juntos por el Cambio (2021–2025); United Provinces (2025–present)
- Education: National University of Rosario

Maximiliano Nicolás "Maxi" Pullaro (born 6 December 1974) is an Argentine politician, currently serving as a Governor of Santa Fe Province since 10 December 2023. A member of the Radical Civic Union (UCR), he previously served two terms as a member of the provincial legislature and as Minister of Security under Governor Miguel Lifschitz from 2015 to 2019.

== Early life and career ==
Pullaro was born on 6 December 1974 into a landowning family in the small agrarian town of Hughes, in the General López Department of Santa Fe Province. He studied law at the National University of Rosario.

== Security minister of Santa Fe ==
In 2015, he was appointed as Minister of Security of Santa Fe Province by Governor Miguel Lifschitz. A few days after taking office, he faced the fallout from the triple escape from the prison in General Alvear, Buenos Aires. On 9 January 2016, Martín Lanatta, Christian Lanatta, and Víctor Schillaci were captured near Cayastá, two weeks after their escape, in an operation conducted by the Santa Fe Police. Pullaro stated that "the experience demonstrates the need for greater coordination between the federal and provincial security forces", after President Mauricio Macri announced that all three fugitives had been captured, when only one had actually been apprehended. The other two were captured near the area the following day.

In December 2016, he became involved in a major dispute with Corrientes Province governor Ricardo Colombi over raids carried out in the city of Goya. The dispute culminated in the arrest of José Moyano, head of the province's former Dangerous Drugs division. Pullaro stated: "If every time we carry out a raid we have to announce where we are going, that information could be leaked, and under no circumstances do we want the operation to fail."

Another widely publicized incident occurred in 2017, when Pullaro received an anonymous envelope informing him of alleged corruption involving police chief Rafael Grau. The complaint alleged that spare parts for police vehicles had been purchased at inflated prices and that payments had been made for services that were never provided.

Pullaro played a key role in the arrest of seven members of "Los Monos", a prominent drug-trafficking criminal organization based in Rosario. He testified about his role in the investigation on 31 August 2021 and was praised by figures from across the political spectrum.

== Governor of Santa Fe ==
=== Election and campaign ===
Pullaro decided to run for governor of Santa Fe, with former PRO national deputy Gisela Scaglia as his running mate. In the primaries, he won the "United to Change Santa Fe" nomination, defeating Radical Civic Union senator Carolina Losada and Socialist deputy Mónica Fein. In the general election, he faced Peronist candidate Marcelo Lewandowski, whom he defeated by a wide margin. He received more than one million votes, becoming the most-voted gubernatorial candidate in the province's history. Public security was the central issue of his campaign. He took office on 10 December 2023.

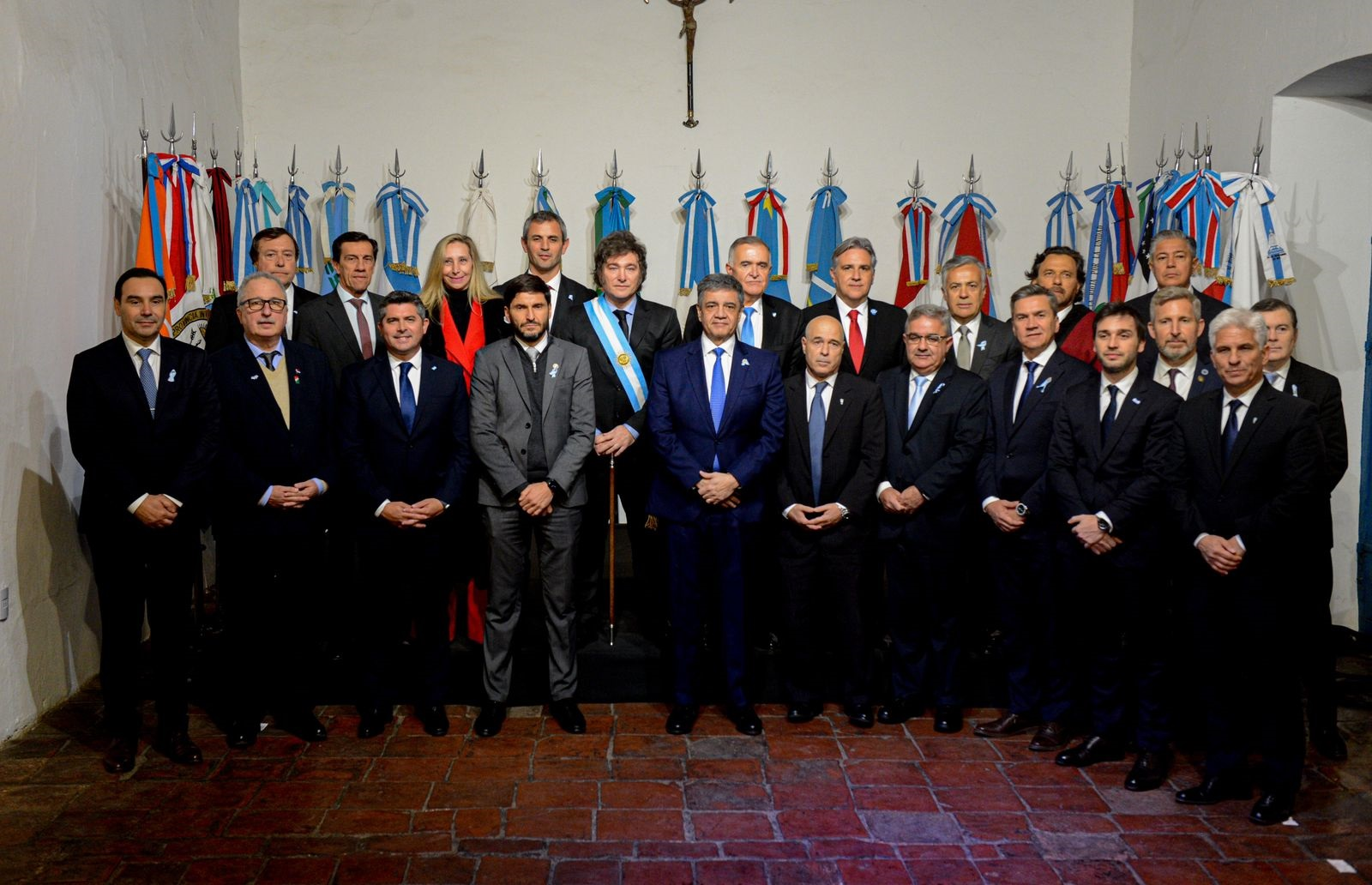
Pullaro alongside the governors of 18 other provinces and President Javier Milei during the signing of the May 25th Pact.

=== Security ===
Among his first measures were the reinstatement of high-security prison wings for inmates convicted of drug-trafficking offences, an increase in the number of police patrol vehicles in the cities of Santa Fe and Rosario, and the abolition of the non-retention policy in secondary schools.

In early 2026, the provincial government's salary policy for the Santa Fe Police, based on staggered increases tied to tax revenue and without automatic indexation, triggered protests, coordinated use of police sirens, and partial barracks confinement in Rosario and Santa Fe. The unrest intensified following the suicide of a non-commissioned officer at the headquarters of Rosario's Regional Unit II. The Ministry of Justice and Security placed at least 20 officers on administrative leave, citing abandonment of duty and unlawful conduct during the demonstrations, while acknowledging the legitimacy of the salary dispute.

In response, the provincial government introduced a police welfare package that combined salary increases, including a minimum salary and additional payments for operational and command duties, with expanded mental health, transportation, and accommodation measures.

=== Constitutional reform ===
As governor, Pullaro promoted a reform of the provincial constitution, which had not been amended since 1962. The reform required approval by a qualified majority in both chambers of the provincial legislature, and the enabling law was passed on 6 December 2024. The election of constitutional convention delegates was held on 13 April 2025. Pullaro headed the list of the United to Change Santa Fe coalition, which received approximately 35% of the vote, almost 20 percentage points more than the second-placed candidate, Peronist Juan Monteverde.

Following two months of intensive debate and negotiations, a new provincial constitution was approved on 10 September 2025. It added 46 new articles, amended another 42, and included 27 transitional provisions. Among its principal reforms were the establishment of municipal autonomy and changes to the terms of office in smaller localities, all of which would henceforth elect their authorities every four years rather than every two years. It also limited all local and provincial authorities to two four-year terms, including the governor, who had previously been barred from seeking immediate re-election. The composition of the Supreme Court was also changed to seven members, with a mandatory retirement age of 75.

== Electoral history ==
=== Executive ===
Electoral history of Maximiliano Pullaro
Election	Office	List	Votes			Result	Ref.
Election	Office	List	Total	%	P.	Result	Ref.
2023	Governor of Santa Fe	United to Change Santa Fe	1,031,964	58.47%	1st	Elected	

=== Legislative ===
Electoral history of Maximiliano Pullaro
Election	Office	List	#	District	Votes			Result	Ref.
Election	Office	List	#	District	Total	%	P.	Result	Ref.
2011	Provincial Deputy	Progressive, Civic and Social Front	13	Santa Fe Province	550,882	36.12%	2nd (Note: Presented on an electoral list. The data shown represents the share of the vote the entire party/alliance received in that constituency.)	Elected	
2019	Provincial Deputy	Progressive, Civic and Social Front	3	Santa Fe Province	712,485	41.17%	1st	Elected	

Political offices
Preceded by Omar Perotti	Governor of Santa Fe; 2023–present	Incumbent
