= Héctor Cavallero =

Argentine politician (1939–2020)

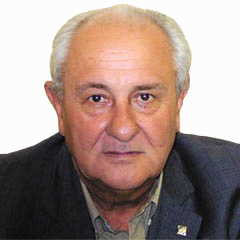
Héctor Cavallero in 2002

Héctor Cavallero (2 October 1939 – 2 October 2020), nicknamed El Tigre ("The Tiger"), was an Argentine politician, who was mayor of Rosario, Santa Fe, and a member of the Argentine Chamber of Deputies for the Province of Santa Fe.

== Biography ==
Cavallero was born in Las Parejas, Santa Fe. He attended high school in the General Paz Military Liceum in Córdoba, and studied Biochemistry at the National University of the Littoral.

Cavallero was elected to the Rosario City Council in 1985, and as Mayor of Rosario in 1989 for the Popular Socialist Party (an offshoot of the Socialist Party). Former mayor Horacio Usandizaga, a Radical, had publicly vowed to resign if Carlos Menem was elected President of Argentina. Upon Menem's success in the 1989 election and Raúl Alfonsín's early departure from office, Usandizaga kept his word, and Cavallero was appointed to complete his term. Cavallero was re-elected in his own right for the 1991–1995 period. His term as mayor spanning the period 10 December 1989 until 10 December 1995.

Despite his affiliation, Cavallero eventually decided to align himself with the Justicialist Menem administration. He ran for governor of Santa Fe in the 1995 election along with other Justicialist candidates, under the electoral system called Ley de Lemas, which allowed several factions of the same party to present candidates for the main election and add up their votes. Horacio Usandizaga ran for governor and obtained the majority of votes; but this system ultimately favored the "pure" Justicialist candidate Jorge Obeid, whose votes were supplemented by Cavallero's.

Having severed his ties with the Socialist Party, Cavallero remained a supporter of the increasingly conservative and unpopular Menem administration. He founded a new party, Partido del Progreso Social (Party for Social Progress), returned to the Rosario City Council in 1997, and was elected in 1999 to the Argentine Chamber of Deputies for Santa Fe. He held office until 2003. Opting not to seek a second term in Congress, Cavallero again ran for governor in 2003, and again lost to Jorge Obeid.

He competed in the Justicialist-led Front for Victory (FpV) primaries in 2007 for mayor of Rosario with the support of FpV gubernatorial candidate Rafael Bielsa and against Juan Héctor Sylvestre Begnis. He defeated Begnis in the primaries, obtaining more than twice the number of votes; but in the 2 September general election, however, he lost by a landslide to his former collaborator, Socialist Mayor Miguel Lifschitz, who was thus re-elected. He was returned by voters to the Rosario City Council in 2009. In the 2015 Provincial election of Santa Fe Cavallero was elected as Deputy to the Legislature of Santa Fe and he held this position until December 2019.

He died of unknown causes on 2 October 2020 at the age of 81.

Preceded by Horacio Usandizaga	Mayor of Rosario; 1989–1995	Succeeded by Hermes Binner
