= Omar Perotti =

Former Governor of Santa Fe

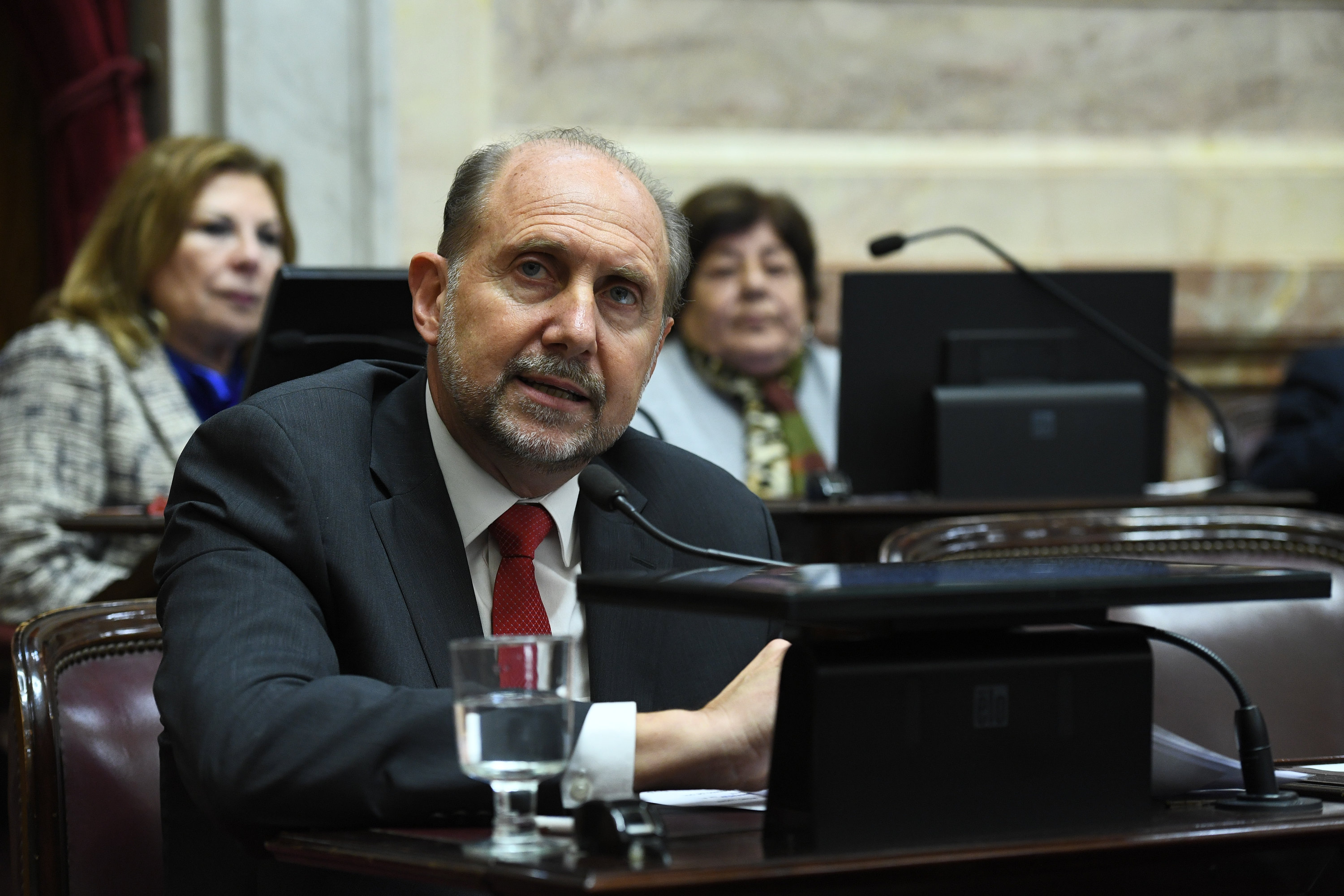

Governor of Santa Fe
- In office 11 December 2019 – 11 December 2023
- Vice Governor: Alejandra Rodenas
- Preceded by: Miguel Lifschitz
- Succeeded by: Maximiliano Pullaro

National Senator
- In office 10 December 2015 – 10 December 2019
- Constituency: Santa Fe

National Deputy
- In office 10 December 2011 – 10 December 2015
- Constituency: Santa Fe

Mayor of Rafaela
- In office 10 December 2003 – 10 December 2011
- Preceded by: Ricardo M. Pairone
- Succeeded by: Luis Castellano
- In office 10 December 1991 – 10 December 1995
- Preceded by: Jorge Fernández
- Succeeded by: Ricardo M. Peirone

Personal details
- Born: 16 September 1959 (age 67) Rafaela, Argentina
- Party: Justicialist Party
- Other political affiliations: Front for Victory (2011–2017); Frente de Todos (2019–present)
- Education: National University of the Littoral

Omar Ángel Perotti (born 16 September 1959) is an Argentine accountant and Justicialist Party politician. He was Governor of Santa Fe from 2019 to 2023, National Senator from 2015 to 2019, and from 2011 to 2015 he was a National Deputy, always representing the same province. He was also intendente (mayor) of Rafaela from 1991 to 1995 and again from 2003 to 2011.

== Early life and education ==
Perotti was born on 16 September 1959 in Rafaela, in Santa Fe Province. His father, Miguel Ángel Perotti, owned a traditional tambo (milking yard) in the outskirts of Rafaela. Perotti studied accounting at the National University of the Littoral and worked as an accountant in Santa Fe City.

== Political career ==
Perotti's first elected post was as intendente (mayor) of his hometown, Rafaela. He was elected in 1991, aged 31. Upon finishing his term in 1995 he was appointed Minister of Agriculture in the cabinet of Governor Jorge Obeid, a post he held until 1999, when he was elected to the Provincial Senate. After a stint as an IDB advisor in Washington in 2002, Perotti returned to Rafaela to run for a second term in the mayoralty in 2003 and was elected.

He was reelected in 2007. During his second term he was subject to criticism for his alignment with the national government of Cristina Fernández de Kirchner during the conflict between the government and the agrarian sector. In 2011 he was elected to the Argentine Chamber of Deputies in the Front for Victory list, representing Santa Fe Province. In 2015 he ran for the governorship of the province, but landed third in the primary elections, behind the Socialist Party candidate Miguel Lifschitz and the PRO candidate Miguel del Sel. That same year he was elected to the National Senate, also representing Santa Fe, for a six-year term.

As Senator, he became known nationwide for his abstention in the debate for the Legal Pregnancy Interruption bill in 2018.

Political offices
Preceded by Jorge Fernández	Mayor of Rafaela; 1991–1995	Succeeded by Ricardo M. Peirone
Preceded by Ricardo M. Peirone	Mayor of Rafaela; 2003–2011	Succeeded by Luis Castellano
Preceded by Miguel Lifschitz	Governor of Santa Fe; 2019–2023	Succeeded by Maximiliano Pullaro
