= Vice Governor of Santa Fe Province =

Second-highest constitutional office in Santa Fe Province

- Vicegobernador de la Provincia de Santa Fe
- Provincial coat of Arms

- Incumbent; Vacant since 9 December 2025
- Style: Mr. Vice Governor (formal); His/Her Excellency (diplomatic)
- Status: Second highest executive branch officer
- Residence: Lives in his own residence
- Seat: Santa Fe Province
- Appointer: Direct popular vote
- Term length: Four years, renewable once consecutively
- Constituting instrument: Constitution of Santa Fe
- Inaugural holder: Mariano Comas
- Formation: 1870
- Succession: First
- Deputy: President pro tempore of Senate of Santa Fe
- Website: www.santafe.gov.ar

The vice governor of Santa Fe Province (Spanish: Vice-gobernador de la Provincia de Santa Fe) is the second-highest position in the executive branch of the government of Santa Fe Province, Argentina, after the governor, and ranks first in the state's governmental succession.

It has the function of replacing the governor in case of travel abroad or impediments and to succeed him in case of resignation, death or removal from office by specific process. To be vice-governor it is necessary to be Argentine born and to be at least 30 years old, and to prove two years of immediate residence in the province if the prospective candidate was not born there.

The last person to hold the position was Gisela Scaglia, who resigned. Currently, the vice-governorship is vacant from December 9, 2025. Unofficially, Felipe Michlig, as the pro tempore president of the Senate of Santa Fe, would be next in line to assume the governorship in the event of a government vacancy, since there is no designated vice-governor.

== Overview ==
=== Election ===
Article 70 of the Constitution of Santa Fe states that:

The governor and vice-governor are directly elected by the people of the Province by a simple plurality of votes. The election must be held no more than six months and no less than three months in advance. In the event of a tie, the Legislative Assembly, elected in the same election, will decide in a single session and without debate by an absolute majority of the members present.

=== Intervention of the vice-governor ===
Article 66 states the following:

The vice-governor replaces the governor in case of death, removal from office, resignation, or subsequent physical or mental incapacity, for the remainder of the legal term; and in case of illness, absence, or suspension, until the impediment ceases.

Article 71:

If the elected governor dies or resigns before taking office, the jointly elected vice-governor shall replace him.

== Vicegovernors since 1983 ==
Name	Term	Notes
Carlos Aurelio Martínez	1983 - 1987	
Miguel Ángel Robles	1991–1995	
Gualberto Venecia	1995–1999	
Marcelo Muniagurria	1999–2003	
María Eugenia Bielsa	2003–2007	
Griselda Tessio	2007–2011	
Jorge Henn	2011–2015	
Carlos Fascendini	2015–2019	
Alejandra Rodenas	2019–2023	
Gisela Scaglia	2023–2025	Resigned from her position to assume the role of National Deputy
Vacant	2025–present	

== See also ==
- Governor of Santa Fe Province
- Legislature of Santa Fe
  - Senate of Santa Fe
  - Chamber of Deputies of Santa Fe
