= Gisela Scaglia =

Argentine politician (born 1972)

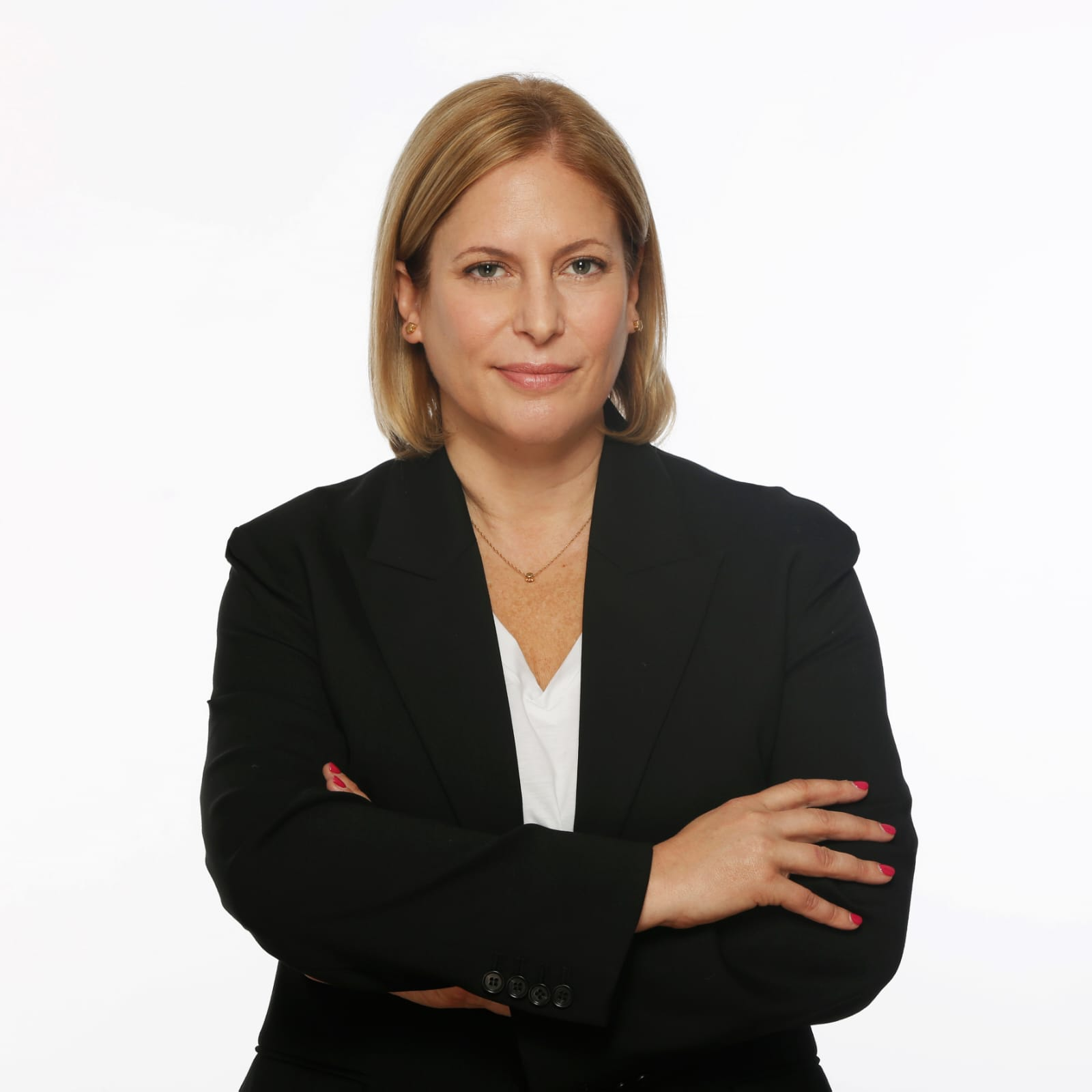

National Deputy
- Incumbent
- Assumed office 10 December 2025
- Constituency: Santa Fe
- In office 10 December 2013 – 10 December 2021
- Constituency: Santa Fe

Vice Governor of Santa Fe
- In office 11 December 2023 – 9 December 2025
- Governor: Maximiliano Pullaro
- Preceded by: Alejandra Rodenas
- Succeeded by: Vacant

Personal details
- Born: 22 October 1976 (age 49) Gálvez, Santa Fe, Argentina
- Party: Republican Proposal
- Other political affiliations: Juntos por el Cambio (2015–2023); Unidos para Cambiar Santa Fe (2023–present)
- Education: National University of Rosario

Gisela Scaglia (born 22 October 1976) is an Argentine politician who has been Vice Governor of Santa Fe Province since 2023 until 2025, serving under Maximiliano Pullaro's administration.

She is a member of the Republican Proposal (PRO) party. From 2013 to 2021 she was a member of the Argentine Chamber of Deputies for Santa Fe.

== Early life and education ==
Scaglia was born on 22 October 1976 in Gálvez, Santa Fe. She studied political science at the National University of Rosario, graduating with a licenciatura degree in 2003. In 2020 she completed a Master of Public Administration from Torcuato di Tella University.

== Political career ==
Scaglia ran for one of Santa Fe's nine seats in the National Chamber of Deputies in the 2013 legislative election. She was the second candidate in the Republican Proposal list, after Miguel del Sel. The list received 27.20% of the vote, enough for Scaglia to make it past the D'Hondt cut to be elected. She was sworn in on 10 December 2013. She was re-elected in 2017 as part of the Cambiemos list, which came first in the voting with 37.80% of the vote.

During her two terms she focused on legislation concerning youth policies, agriculture, environment, health, and education. Notable among her sponsored bills that became law are Law 27,621, establishing Comprehensive Environmental Education across Argentina, and Law 27,642 which seeks to promote healthy nutrition.

On 8 May 2023, Maximiliano Pullaro announced his gubernatorial candidacy for the Santa Fe primary elections (PASO), selecting Scaglia as his running mate. The Pullaro-Scaglia ticket, buoyed by the catch-all United to Change Santa Fe coalition, achieved a decisive victory in the general election, defeating the ruling Peronists by a 27% margin. Scaglia assumed office as Vice Governor of Santa Fe on 11 December 2023.

== Electoral history ==
=== Executive ===
Electoral history of Martín Llaryora
Election	Office	List	Votes			Result	Ref.
Election	Office	List	Total	%	P.	Result	Ref.
2023	Vice Governor of Santa Fe	United to Change Santa Fe	1,031,964	58.47%	1st	Elected	

=== Legislative ===
Electoral history of Martín Llaryora
Election	Office	List	#	District	Votes			Result	Ref.
Election	Office	List	#	District	Total	%	P.	Result	Ref.
2013	National Deputy	Federal PRO Union	2	Santa Fe	516,444	27.20%	2nd (Note: Presented on an electoral list. The data shown represents the share of the vote the entire party/alliance received in that constituency.)	Elected	
2017	National Deputy	Cambiemos	4	Santa Fe	743,139	37.80%	1st	Elected	

Political offices
Preceded by Alejandra Rodenas	Vice Governor of Santa Fe; 2023–present	Incumbent
