= Jorge Obeid =

Argentine politician

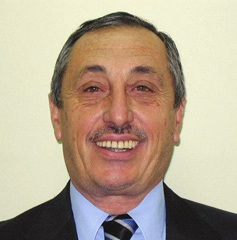

National Deputy
- In office 10 December 2013 – 28 January 2014
- Constituency: Santa Fe
- In office 10 December 2007 – 10 December 2011
- Constituency: Santa Fe
- In office 10 December 1999 – 10 December 2003
- Constituency: Santa Fe

Governor of Santa Fe
- In office 10 December 2003 – 10 December 2007
- Vice Governor: María Eugenia Bielsa
- Preceded by: Carlos A. Reutemann
- Succeeded by: Hermes J. Binner
- In office 10 December 1995 – 9 December 1999
- Vice Governor: Gualberto Venecia
- Preceded by: Carlos A. Reutemann
- Succeeded by: Carlos A. Reutemann

Mayor of Santa Fe
- In office 1989–1995
- Preceded by: Carlos Martínez
- Succeeded by: Horacio Rosatti

Personal details
- Born: 24 November 1947 Diamante, Entre Ríos Province, Argentina
- Died: 28 January 2014 (aged 66) Santa Fe, Santa Fe Province, Argentina
- Party: Justicialist Party; Front for Victory (2003–2014)
- Spouse: Elba Kemer
- Education: National University of the Littoral
- Profession: Chemical engineer

Jorge Alberto Obeid (24 November 1947 – 28 January 2014) was an Argentine Justicialist Party (PJ) politician who was twice governor of Santa Fe Province and thrice a member of the Argentine Chamber of Deputies.

== Early life and education ==
Obeid was born in Diamante, Entre Ríos, to Edi D'Acierno, of Italian descent, and Juan Obeid, of Lebanese descent. He enrolled at the National University of the Littoral, in Santa Fe, and graduated with a degree in chemical engineering. He taught there from 1972 to 1976, and became a Peronist Youth activist at the time. This forced him to leave the country following the March 1976 coup, and returning from exile in Peru in 1977 to visit family in Diamante he was detained. Following the return of democracy in 1983, Obeid worked as a chemist in a polyurethane plant. He married Elba Inés Kemer, and they had five children.

== Political career ==
Obeid remained active in Peronist politics after his return, and in 1987 was elected to the Santa Fe City Council. He became President of the Council in 1989, and when Mayor Carlos Aurelio Martínez resigned later that year, he succeeded him as mayor. Obeid was elected mayor in his own right in 1991, and later served as President of Argentine Federation of Cities (1992–93) and as representative for Santa Fe Province in the 1994 Constitutional Convention.

=== Governor of Santa Fe ===
He was elected governor of the province for the first time in 1995, winning an election that was fraught with problems, including a breakdown in the computer system counting the ballots that forced a recount to be done by hand. Obeid was declared the winner after 37 days, subsequent to charges of fraud and manipulation. He was backed by outgoing governor Carlos Reutemann and Buenos Aires Province Governor Eduardo Duhalde, narrowly defeating Alliance candidate Horacio Usandizaga and an alternative Peronist candidate backed by President Carlos Menem, Rosario Mayor Héctor Cavallero. He served until 1999, when former Governor Reutemann was returned by voters to a second four-year term.

The provincial constitution of Santa Fe does not allow for reelection of a governor, and Obeid was elected to the Argentine Chamber of Deputies in 1999. He was then returned by voters as governor for a second, non-consecutive term in 2003. Under his administration, and following his initiative, the provincial legislature repealed the controversial electoral law called Ley de Lemas, which had allowed Obeid to twice win the governorship after obtaining fewer votes than his closest opponent. Termed out of office, Obeid headed the Front for Victory Santa Fe party list for seats in the Chamber of Deputies. His term as governor ended in December 2007 and he was succeeded by the Socialist Mayor of Rosario, Hermes Binner.

He served one more full term as Congressman from 2007 to 2011, and returned to Congress in 2013. Obeid died the following month, however, of a pulmonary embolism; he was 66.

Preceded by Carlos Reutemann	Governor of Santa Fe; 1995–1999	Succeeded by Carlos Reutemann
Preceded by Carlos Reutemann	Governor of Santa Fe; 2003–2007	Succeeded by Hermes Binner
