= Carolina Losada =

Argentinian politician and journalist (born 1972)

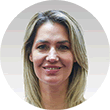

National Senator
- Incumbent
- Assumed office 10 December 2021
- Constituency: Santa Fe

Personal details
- Born: December 16, 1972 (age 53) Rosario, Santa Fe, Argentina
- Party: Radical Civic Union
- Other political affiliations: Juntos por el Cambio

Carolina Losada (born 16 December 1972) is an Argentine politician, television presenter and panelist. She currently sits as a National Senator for Santa Fe Province since 2021. From 2021 to 2023, she was Vice President of the Senate.

She announced in May 2023 her intention to run for Governor of Santa Fe Province in the 2023 elections as part of the United to Change Santa Fe coalition, but ultimately lost in the PASO primaries against Maximiliano Pullaro, who went on to be elected governor in October 2023.

== Personal life ==
She is engaged to fellow senator Luis Petcoff Naidenoff.

== See also ==
- List of Argentine senators, 2021–2023
