= Mariano Vera =

Argentine politician

Mariano Vera (Santa Fe de la Vera Cruz, Viceroyalty of the Río de la Plata c. 1780 – Cayastá, Santa Fe, Argentine Confederation 26 March 1840) was a caudillo and governor of the Santa Fe Province, United Provinces of the Rio de la Plata, between 12 April 1816 and 23 July 1818, all during a period of change driven by revolution and civil war in this portion of South America.

Vera was a supporter of federalism, against the idea of a centralized government. After the proclamation of the first national government junta, in 1810, Santa Fe was ruled by lieutenant governors sent from the capital Buenos Aires, which did not sit well with many local citizens and worked to increase the influence of the federalist leader José Gervasio Artigas, based on the Eastern Bank (today's Uruguay). The Supreme Directorship invaded Santa Fe in March 1815; the next month Artigas liberated it and set up Francisco Candioti as governor. Candioti was in turn ousted and replaced by the centralist Juan Francisco Tarragona.

Vera and other political leaders, notably Estanislao López, gathered the support of Candioti's followers, and rebelled in March 1816, helped by Artigas's troops coming via Paraná, Entre Ríos. Buenos Aires's occupation forces under Juan José Viamonte were defeated, and Mariano Vera was elected governor of Santa Fe.

Soon afterwards, the governments of Santa Fe and Buenos Aires signed treaties by which Buenos Aires acknowledged Santa Fe as a "free and independent" entity until a national constitution was drawn by the upcoming Congress of Tucumán. Santa Fe would send a deputy to the Congress, and the economically essential roads passing through Santa Fe towards Peru and Chile would not be closed to traffic.

Governor Vera thus adopted a pragmatic equilibrium stance between Artigas and Buenos Aires, prioritizing the interests of the province rather than ideological concerns. Santa Fe, an agricultural region beside the Paraná River, needed to have access to the port of Buenos Aires and at the same time could not allow Buenos Aires to centralize power, which would make its port the only one allowed to function (as it happened decades later, during the rule of Juan Manuel de Rosas). However, the government of Buenos Aires delayed the ratification of the treaties, and started a campaign to retake power in Santa Fe, first through a failed military operation in August 1816, and then giving support to Vera's political enemies and to uprisings in Santa Fe and other provinces.

Vera turned decidedly to support the cause of Artigas, sending troops, guns and supplies to the Eastern Bank (modern-day Uruguay). The hostilities continued. In March 1818 Buenos Aires sent new military missions to Santa Fe and Entre Ríos. Governor Vera, weakened, was eventually ousted by his former ally Estanislao López, who would prevail over the centralist army and rule the province for twenty years.

Preceded by Juan Francisco Tarragona	Governor of Santa Fe; 1816–1818	Succeeded by Estanislao López

== Sources ==
In Spanish unless otherwise noted.

- Historia General de las Relaciones Exteriores de la República Argentina. El caso de Santa Fe, etc.
- País Global. Cronología de la Historia Argentina - 1816.
