= Alejandra Rodenas =

Argentine lawyer, university professor and politician

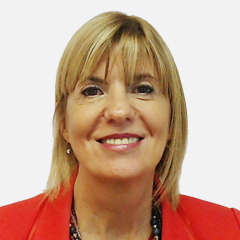

Vice Governor of Santa Fe
- In office 11 December 2019 – 11 December 2023
- Governor: Omar Perotti
- Preceded by: Carlos Fascendini
- Succeeded by: Gisela Scaglia

National Deputy
- In office 10 December 2017 – 10 December 2019
- Constituency: Santa Fe

Personal details
- Born: Alejandra Silvana Rodenas; 26 September 1963 (age 63) Rosario, Argentina
- Party: Justicialist Party
- Education: National University of Rosario
- Occupation: Lawyer, judge, teacher, politician
- Website: alejandrarodenas.com.ar

Alejandra Silvana Rodenas (born 26 September 1963) is an Argentine lawyer, former judge, university professor, and politician of the Justicialist Party. She served as Judge of Provincial Courts from October 1999 to June 2017. She acquired public notoriety for the prosecution of a part of the narco (drug trafficking) gang Los Monos, in addition to handling the case of the murder of an alleged gang member, Luis Medina. She also carried out the prosecution of those responsible for shooting at the house of Governor Antonio Bonfatti in October 2013.

In June 2017, Alejandra Rodenas resigned from her position as judge and launched her candidacy for national deputy for Santa Fe Province as part of the New Santafesino – Justicialist Front. After serving in the Chamber of Deputies for two years, she was elected vice governor of Santa Fe Province on 16 June 2019.

== Biography ==
Alejandra Rodenas was born in Rosario, Santa Fe Province, on 26 September 1963 into a Peronist family. The daughter of Santa Fe leader Antonio Osvaldo "Tito" Rodenas, she spent her childhood in Barrio Echesortu, and at age 18, she entered the Law School at the National University of Rosario (USR), a house of studies where she would work as a teacher years later.

In 1982 she became a Peronist activist at the university, with the Juventud Peronista (JP). In 1983, when the Juventud Universitaria Peronista (JUP) was consolidated, she chose it as her political and ideological space, actively participating in the Law School's student center, and was elected secretary of culture.

In 1986, Rodenas took the entrance exam to the Provincial Courts, where she worked until 1990, when she competed to become a civil servant in the Criminal Court. During the next decade she distanced herself from her interest in politics because of insurmountable differences with Menemism. She then took refuge in university teaching, technical-dogmatic training in criminal law, family life, and her partner, Jorge Llonch – a songwriter for Charly García and Fito Páez – with whom she extended her circle of friends to the music and literature scene.

In 1999, she competed to serve as a Criminal Instruction Judge, becoming part of the first class to enter the judiciary through this modality, endorsed by the Council of Magistracy.

In this position, Rodenas acquired public notoriety for the prosecution of a part of the narco gang Los Monos, in addition to taking up the case of the murder of an alleged narco, Luis Medina. She also carried out the prosecution of those responsible for shooting at the house of governor Antonio Bonfatti in October 2013.

She also actively participated in cases that, after the passage of the Trafficking Act in 2012, allowed her to intervene and close three notorious brothels in Rosario, including La Rosa, where she sought to bring human traffickers to justice. Likewise, and as a result of her active participation as the chair of philosophy in gender issues, she has written numerous articles related to this issue, and appeared in the multimedia documentary Mujeres en venta (Women For Sale), published by the UNR press, as well as writing part of the text of its next edition. She is an active participant in Ni una menos and other movements in defense of the rights of women.

Since 1990, Rodenas has worked as a teacher at the UNR, in the chairs of Introduction to Law (1990–present), Introduction to Philosophy (1990–2008), Philosophy of Law (1993–2003), Seminar of Criminology (2000–2008), in the Faculty of Law, and in the Forensic Psychology postgraduate program of the Faculty of Psychology.

She is an active member of the UNR's Juan Carlos Gardella Center for Study and Research in Human Rights (CEIDH).

In June 2017, Alejandra Rodenas resigned from her position as judge and launched her candidacy for national deputy for Santa Fe Province. She was elected as part of the New Santafesino – Justicialist Front and took office on 10 December. She was elected vice governor of Santa Fe Province on 16 June 2019.

== Personal life ==
Alejandra Rodenas is married to songwriter Jorge Llonch, with whom she has two children.

Political offices
Preceded by Carlos Fascendini	Vice Governor of Santa Fe; 2019–2023	Succeeded by Gisela Scaglia
