= Antonio Bonfatti =

Argentine politician

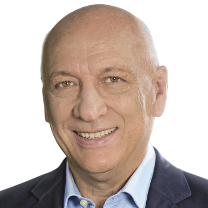

President of the Socialist Party
- In office June 27, 2016 – June 6, 2021
- Preceded by: Hermes Binner
- Succeeded by: Mónica Fein

Governor of Santa Fe
- In office December 10, 2011 – December 10, 2015
- Vice Governor: Jorge Henn
- Preceded by: Hermes Binner
- Succeeded by: Miguel Lifschitz

Minister of Government and State Reform of Santa Fe Province
- In office December 10, 2007 – December 9, 2011
- Governor: Hermes Binner
- Succeeded by: Rubén Galassi

Provincial Deputy of Santa Fe
- In office December 10, 2003 – December 10, 2007

Personal details
- Born: December 1, 1950 (age 75) Rosario, Santa Fe Province
- Party: Socialist Party
- Spouse: Silvia Trócoli
- Education: National University of Rosario
- Occupation: Physician

Antonio Bonfatti (born December 1, 1950) is an Argentine physician and Socialist politician who served as Governor of Santa Fe between 2011 and 2015. From 2016 to 2021, he was president of the Socialist Party.

== Life and times ==
Bonfatti was born in Rosario in 1950. He enrolled at the National University of Rosario and was accepted into the School of Medicine. There, he developed an interest in politics, and in 1972, co-founded the Popular Socialist Party with activists Guillermo Estévez Boero and Hermes Binner. He earned a Medical Degree in 1974, and for the next two years, worked with Binner in a slum clinic outside Rosario.

The March 1976 coup prompted him to relocate to Las Parejas, a small town west of Rosario. He would remain in Las Parejas, working as a physician in a provincial SAMCo clinic and for the Steelworkers' Union in the field of occupational medicine. Upon the return of democracy in 1983, he was elected Mayor. Bonfatti's term expired in 1989, at which time he was elected to the City Council for a four-year term. He maintained his medical practice during his tenure as mayor and councilman, and in 1993 earned a postgraduate degree in healthcare administration.

The election of Hermes Binner as Mayor of Rosario in 1995 was followed by Bonfatti's appointment as Municipal Secretary of Public Health. He was named Secretary of Government by Mayor Binner in 1997 and remained in the post until the end of Binner's term in 2003, when Bonfatti was elected to the Provincial Legislature. His entry into the legislature coincided with Binner's election as governor, and the Socialist Party caucus elected Bonfatti as its leader.

Governor Binner, who was re-elected in 2007, appointed Bonfatti Minister of Government and State Reform. Bonfatti streamlined the bureaucratic and electoral process in the province during his tenure, and was endorsed by Binner as candidate for governor in 2011 on the Progressive, Civic, and Social Front, whose nomination he sought without opposition. He was elected governor on July 24 with nearly 40% of the vote; followed by Republican Proposal candidate, actor Miguel del Sel, with 36%; and Congressman Agustín Rossi of the FpV, with 23%.

Party political offices
Preceded by Hermes Binner	President of the Socialist Party; 2016–2021	Succeeded by Mónica Fein
Political offices
Preceded by Hermes Binner	Governor of Santa Fe; 2011–2015	Succeeded by Miguel Lifschitz
