= Governor of Santa Fe Province =

Head of government of the Santa Fe Province, Argentina

- Provincial coat of Arms

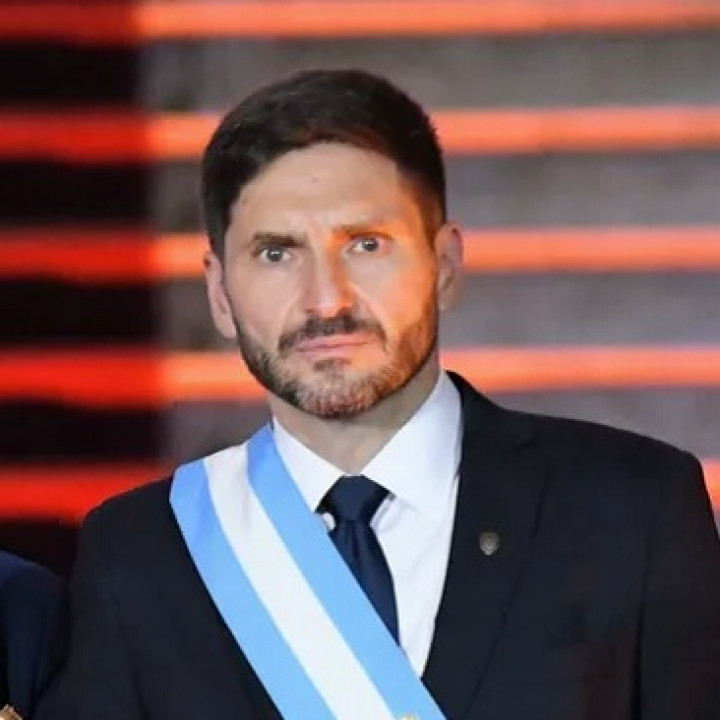
- Incumbent; Maximiliano Pullaro since 10 December 2023
- Style: Mr. Governor (formal); His/Her Excellency (diplomatic)
- Appointer: Direct popular vote
- Term length: 4 years, renewable once consecutively
- Constituting instrument: Constitution of Santa Fe
- Inaugural holder: Francisco Antonio Candioti
- Formation: 1815
- Deputy: Vice Governor of Santa Fe Province
- Website: www.santafe.gov.ar

The Governor of Santa Fe (Spanish: Gobernador de la Provincia de Santa Fe) is a citizen of Santa Fe Province, in Argentina, holding the office of governor for the corresponding period. Currently the governor of Santa Fe is Maximiliano Pullaro, of the Radical Civic Union party.

According to the provincial constitution (sanctioned in 2025), the governor is elected by the simple majority of the popular vote, along with a vice governor, for a four-year term, and can be re-elected for a single consecutive term. The governor must be a native Argentine citizen or the child of a native citizen, and must either have been born in the province or resided continuously in the province during the two years prior to the election.

== List of caudillos ==
Name	Term	Notes
Francisco Antonio Candioti	1815	
Juan Francisco Tarragona	1815–1816	
Mariano Vera	1816–1818	
Estanislao López	1818–1838	

== List of governors ==
Name	Term	Notes
Francisco Antonio Candioti	1815–1815	
Juan Francisco Tarragona	1815–1816	
Mariano Vera	1816–1818	
Estanislao López	1818–1838	
Domingo Cullen	1838	Forced to resign and go into exile after interprovincial dispute about international relations, and dispute concerning constitutional duties of provinces in international disputes concerning relations individual provinces as part of the federation.
Juan Pablo López	1838–1842	
Pascual Echagüe	1842–1845	13th governor
Juan Pablo López	1845–1845	
Pascual Echagüe	1845–1851	15th governor
Domingo Crespo	1851–1854	
José María Cullen	1854–	Son of Domingo Cullen
Tomás Cullen		Son of Domingo Cullen
Pascual Rosas	−1862	
Patricio Cullen	1862–1865	First governor selected under the constitution of 1856. Son of Domingo Cullen.
Nicasio Oroño	1865–1868	Son-in-law of Domingo Cullen
Mariano Cabal	1868–1871	Son-in-law of Patricio Cullen
Simón de Iriondo	1871–1874	
Servando Bayo	1874–1878	
Simón de Iriondo	1878–1882	
Manuel María Zavalla	1882–1886	
José Gálvez	1886–1890	
Juan Manuel Cafferata	1890–1893	
Luciano Leiva	1893–	
José Bernardo Iturraspe		Son-in-law of Patricio Cullen
Enrique Mosca	1920–	
Luis Cárcamo	−1958	
Carlos Sylvestre Begnis	1958–1962	
Aldo Tessio	1963–1966	
Carlos Sylvestre Begnis	1966–	
Aldo Tessio	−1973	
Carlos Sylvestre Begnis	1973–1976	
José María Vernet	1976–1979	
Héctor Salvi	1979–1983	

=== Governors since 1983 ===
Governor	Term in office	Party	Election	Vice Governor
José María Vernet	11 December 1983 – 11 December 1987	PJ	1983	Carlos Aurelio Martínez
Víctor Reviglio	11 December 1987 – 11 December 1991	PJ	1987	Antonio Vanrell
Carlos Reutemann	11 December 1991 – 11 December 1995	PJ	1991	Miguel Ángel Robles
Jorge Obeid	11 December 1995 – 11 December 1999	PJ	1995	Gualberto Venesia
Carlos Reutemann	11 December 1999 – 11 December 2003	PJ	1999	Marcelo Muniagurria
Jorge Obeid	11 December 2003 – 11 December 2007	PJ	2003	María Eugenia Bielsa
Hermes Binner	11 December 2007 – 11 December 2011	PS	2007	Griselda Tessio
Antonio Bonfatti	11 December 2011 – 11 December 2015	PS	2011	Jorge Henn
Miguel Lifschitz	11 December 2015 – 11 December 2019	PS	2015	Carlos Fascendini
Omar Perotti	11 December 2019 – 11 December 2023	PJ	2019	Alejandra Rodenas
Maximiliano Pullaro	11 December 2023 –	UCR	2023	Gisela Scaglia

== See also ==
- Vice Governor of Santa Fe Province
- Legislature of Santa Fe
  - Senate of Santa Fe
  - Chamber of Deputies of Santa Fe
