= Miguel Lifschitz =

Argentine politician (1955–2021)

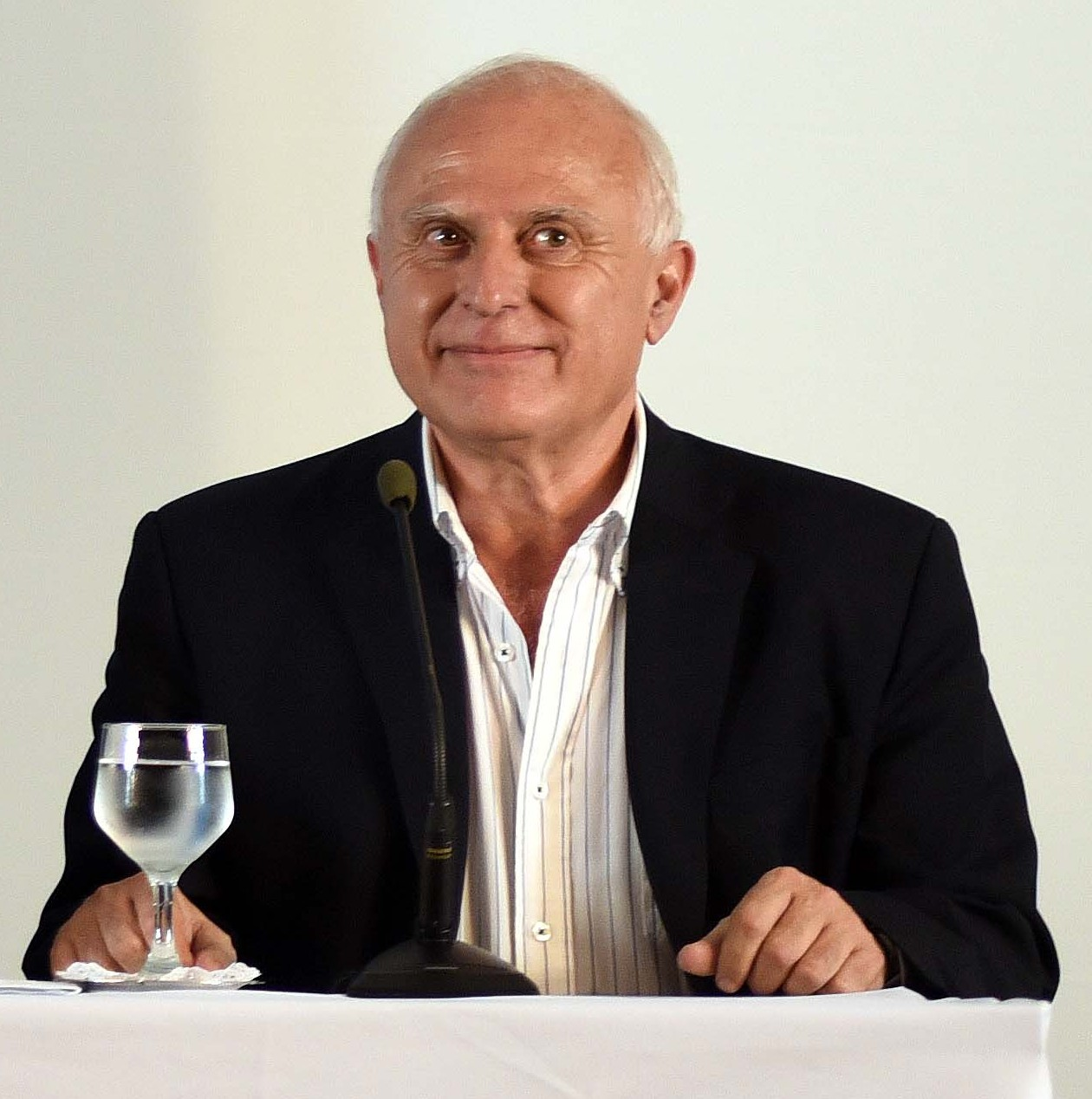

President of the Chamber of Deputies of Santa Fe
- In office 11 December 2019 – 9 May 2021
- Preceded by: Antonio Bonfatti

Provincial Deputy of Santa Fe
- In office 10 December 2019 – 9 May 2021

Governor of Santa Fe
- In office 10 December 2015 – 10 December 2019
- Preceded by: Antonio Bonfatti
- Succeeded by: Omar Perotti

Provincial Senator of Santa Fe
- In office 10 December 2011 – 10 December 2015
- Succeeded by: Miguel Ángel Cappiello
- Constituency: Rosario Department

Mayor of Rosario
- In office 10 December 2003 – 10 December 2011
- Preceded by: Hermes Binner
- Succeeded by: Mónica Fein

Personal details
- Born: 13 September 1955 Rosario, Argentina
- Died: 9 May 2021 (aged 65) Rosario, Argentina
- Cause of death: COVID-19
- Party: Socialist Party
- Other political affiliations: Progressive, Civic and Social Front (2006–2021)

Roberto Miguel Lifschitz (13 September 1955 – 9 May 2021) was an Argentine politician and civil engineer of the Socialist Party who was Governor of Santa Fe Province from 2015 to 2019. Prior to that, he was intendente (mayor) of Rosario, the largest city in the province and the third largest in Argentina, from 2003 to 2011. He also served as Provincial Senator of Santa Fe from 2011 to 2015. He last served as President of the Chamber of Deputies of Santa Fe, a position he held from 2019 until his death in 2021.

== Career ==
Lifschitz earned his degree at the Engineering Faculty of the National University of Rosario in 1979, and worked in the private sector until 1989, when he became Director-General of the Public Housing Service (Director General del Servicio Público de la Vivienda) of the city of Rosario, under the socialist administration of Héctor Cavallero.

He continued working in various public offices, as Municipal Secretary-General (Secretario General de la Municipalidad), Public Services' Secretary (Secretario de Servicios Públicos) and General Cabinet Coordinator for the Municipality of Rosario (Coordinador General de Gabinete de la Municipalidad de Rosario), between June and December 2003, under the administration of Hermes Binner.

Lifschitz ran for Mayor of Rosario and was elected in the provincial elections of 7 September 2003 for the period 2003–2007. In 2006 he began acknowledging he could run for re-election. In March 2007, a survey showed that Lifschitz would win by a wide margin over any of the other major prospective candidates (52.9% of the total votes).

Lifschitz competed in the primaries of the Progressive, Civic and Social Front, on 1 July 2007, against Carlos Comi (of ARI); he obtained around 90% of the vote. In the main election of 2 September 2007, he won his re-election for the period 2007–2011 by a landslide (57–31%) over his closest competitor, former Socialist mayor Héctor Cavallero (who ran for the Peronist-led Front for Victory).

In the elections of 14 June 2015, he was elected as the new governor of the Province of Santa Fe, a position he assumed on 10 December 2015.

After leaving the governor's office he would be elected as a deputy in the provincial legislative elections of June 2019. The victory of the Progressive, Civic and Social Front in these elections caused him to be designated as the new President of the Chamber of Deputies of Santa Fe. Lifschitz would hold this position from 11 December 2019 until his death on 9 May 2021.

== Death ==
In late April 2021, Lifschitz was admitted to hospital after testing positive for COVID-19. His condition worsened by 25 April and he was transferred to intensive care unit and placed on a respirator and was in a coma. He died on 9 May.

Preceded by Antonio Bonfatti	Governor of Santa Fe; 2015–2019	Succeeded by Omar Perotti
Preceded by Hermes Binner	Mayor of Rosario; 2003–2011	Succeeded by Mónica Fein
