= Chamber of Deputies of Santa Fe =

Chamber of Deputies of Santa Fe Cámara de Diputados de la Provincia de Santa Fe

Type
- Type: Lower house of the Legislature of Santa Fe

Leadership
- President: Clara García, PS/UpCSF since 10 December 2023
- Vice President: José Manuel Corral, UCR/UpCSF since 10 December 2023

Structure
- Seats: 50
- Political groups: Government (28): United to Change Santa Fe (28); Opposition (22): Let's Advance Together (9); From the Neighbourhood for the People (1); We Are Life (5); Broad Front for Sovereignty (3); Unity for Santa Fe (2); Inspire (1); Life and Family (1)

Elections
- Last election: 10 September 2023

Meeting place
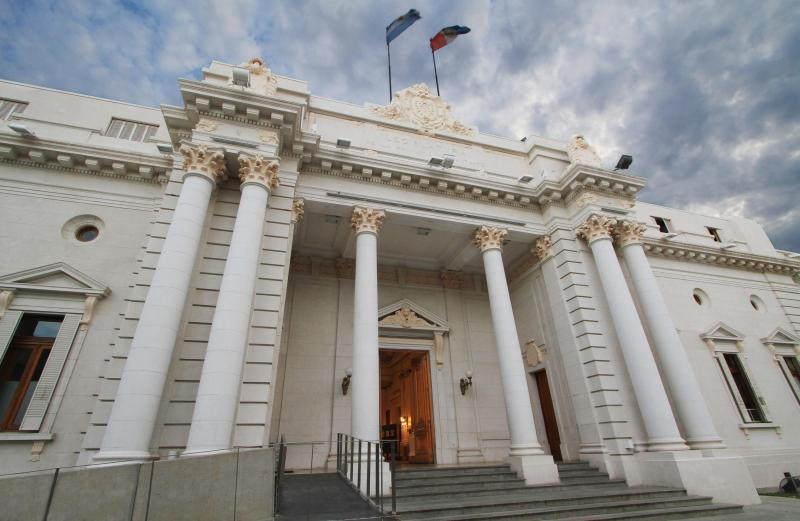
- Legislative Palace of the Province of Santa Fe; Santa Fe, Argentina

Website
- https://diputadossantafe.gov.ar/web/

The Chamber of Deputies of Santa Fe Province (Spanish: Cámara de Diputados de la Provincia de Santa Fe) is the lower house of the Legislature of Santa Fe Province, the third most populous of Argentina's provinces.

The entirety of its members are renewed every four years alongside the governor and the Senate, the upper house of the provincial legislature. It is made up of 50 deputies elected in a single province-wide multi-member constituency through proportional representation using the majority bonus system.

Alongside the Senate, the Chamber of Deputies convenes in the former Customs building in the provincial capital of Santa Fe de la Vera Cruz.

== History ==
The first legislative body of Santa Fe Province was established in 1819 with the provincial statute, which granted attributions to the Cabildo de Santa Fe. A unicameral legislature, composed of 16 members, was established later on by the Constitution of Santa Fe of 1856.

A constitutional reform passed in 1872 during the governorship of Simón de Iriondo divided the legislature into an upper house, the Senate, and a lower house, the Chamber of Deputies, taking after the National Congress of Argentina.
