= Legislature of Santa Fe =

Provincial legislature in Argentina

Type
- Type: Bicameral
- Houses: Senate; Chamber of Deputies

Leadership
- Senate President (Vice Governor): Alejandra Rodenas (PJ) since 10 December 2019
- Senate Provisional President: Rubén Pirola (PJ) since 10 December 2011
- Chamber President: Pablo Farías (FPCyS) since 10 December 2021

Structure
- Seats: 69 members: 19 senators; 50 deputies
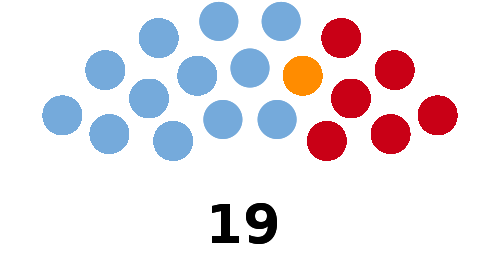
- Senate political groups: Justicialist (12); UCR (6); Progressive, Civic and Social Front (1)
- Chamber of Deputies political groups: Progressive, Civic and Social Front (28); Justicialist (6); JxC (5); Unite (4); Social and Popular Front (2); Igualdad (2); Somos Vida (2); Renewal Front (1)

Elections
- Last Senate election: 16 June 2019
- Last Chamber of Deputies election: 16 June 2019
- Next Senate election: 2023
- Next Chamber of Deputies election: 2023

Meeting place
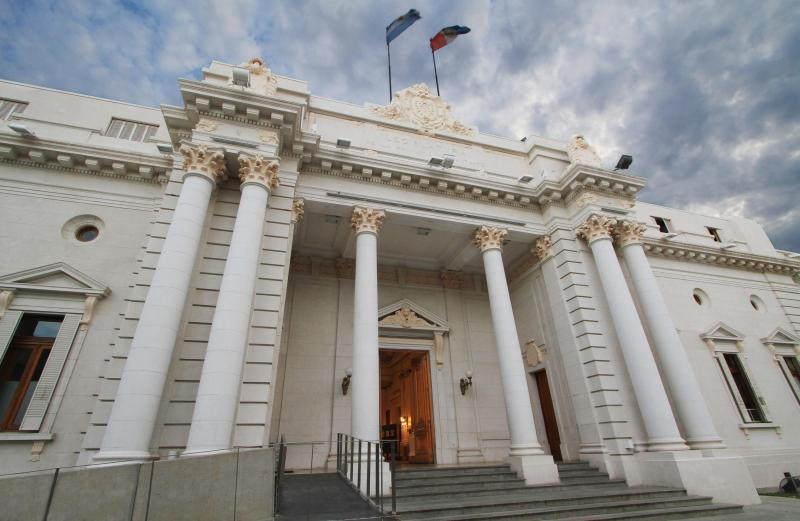
- Edificio de la Legislatura; Santa Fe, Santa Fe Province

The Legislature of Santa Fe Province (Spanish: Legislatura de la Provincia de Santa Fe) is the bicameral legislature of the Santa Fe Province, in Argentina. It comprises an upper house, the Senate (with 19 senators), and a lower house, the Chamber of Deputies (with 50 deputies). It is one of eight bicameral legislatures in the country.

Elections to the legislature take place every four years, when both houses are renewed in entirety. Senators are elected using the first-past-the-post system in single-member constituencies corresponding to the 19 departments of Santa Fe. In the Chamber of Deputies, 22 members are elected using proportional representation and the D'Hondt method, while the remaining 28 seats are allocated using the majority bonus system.

The legislature's powers and attributions are established in the provincial constitution. Much like the Argentine Senate is chaired by the Vice President of Argentina, the Senate of Santa Fe is chaired by the vice governor, who is elected every four years alongside the governor. Since 2019, Alejandra Rodenas of the Justicialist Party has served as vice governor of Santa Fe.

Both houses of the Legislature meet in the Edificio de la Legislatura, in the provincial capital, Santa Fe. The building, in use since 1914, is located on the site of the former provincial customs office.

== See also ==
- Governor of Santa Fe Province
- List of provincial legislatures in Argentina
- National Congress of Argentina
