= Santa Fe Province =

Province of Argentina

Coordinates: 33.7227°S 62.246°W

Santa Fe
- Province
- Province of Santa Fe; Provincia de Santa Fe (Spanish)
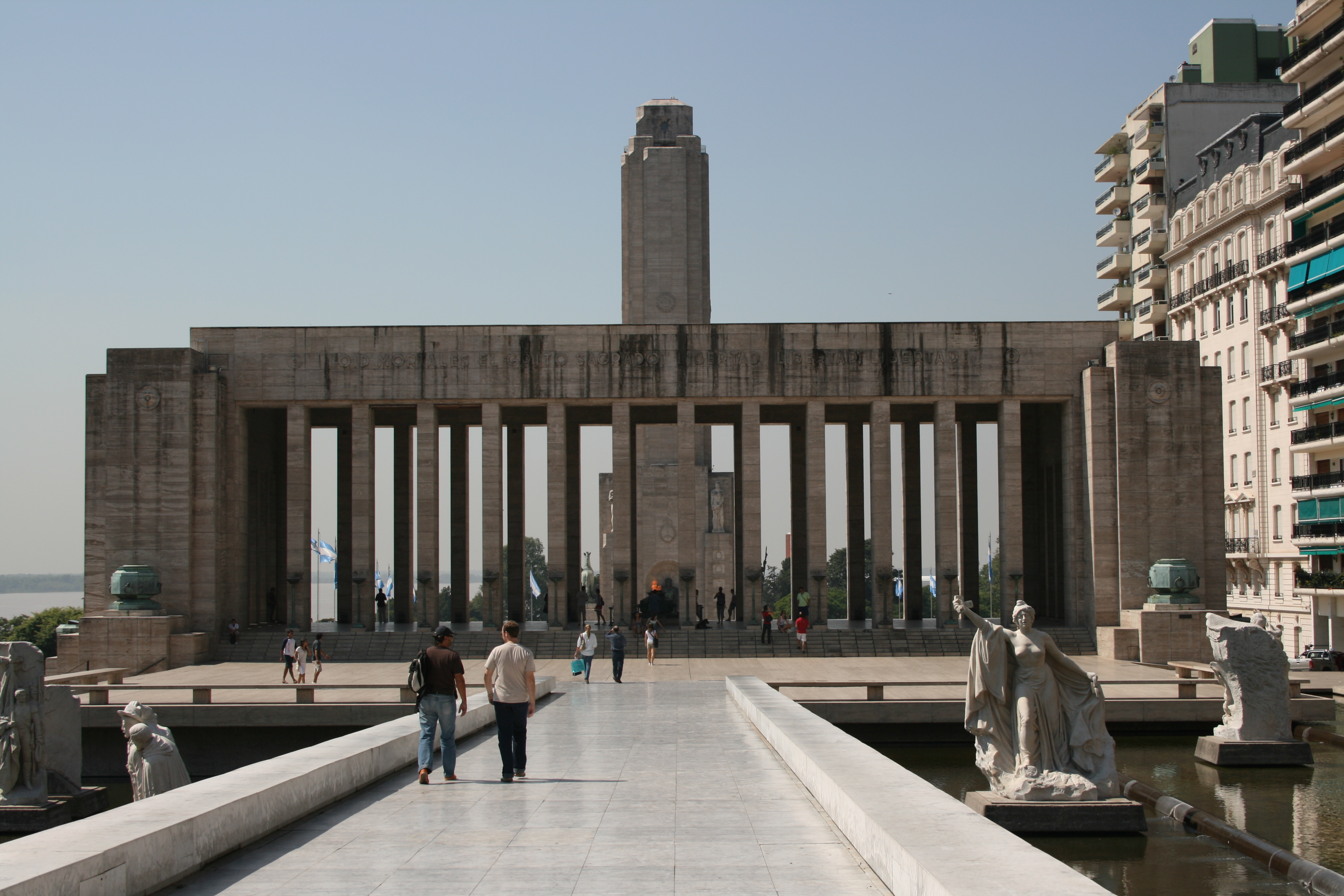
- The National Flag Memorial

- Flag Coat of arms

- Location of Santa Fe Province within Argentina
- Country: Argentina
- Departments: 19
- Districts: 365
- Municipalities and communes: 352
- Capital: Santa Fe de la Vera Cruz

Government
  - Governor: Maximiliano Pullaro (UCR)
  - Vice Governor: Vacant
  - Legislature: Chamber of Deputies (50); Senate (19)
  - National Deputies: 19
  - National Senators: Carolina Losada, Eduardo Galaretto, Marcelo Lewandowski

Area Ranked 10th
  - Total: 133,007 km^{2} (51,354 sq mi)
- Elevation: 20 m (66 ft)

Population (2022 census)
  - Total: 3,556,522
  - Rank: 3rd
  - Density: 26.7394/km^{2} (69.2546/sq mi)
- Demonym: santafesino

GDP
  - Total: peso 1,831 billion (US$39 billion) (2019)
- Time zone: UTC−3 (ART)
- ISO 3166 code: AR-S
- HDI (2021): 0.841 very high (13th)
- Website: www.santafe.gob.ar

Santa Fe, officially Province of Santa Fe (Spanish: Provincia de Santa Fe, Spanish pronunciation: [ˈsanta ˈfe], lit. "Holy Faith") is a province of Argentina, located in the center-east of the country. Neighboring provinces are from the north clockwise Chaco (divided by the 28th parallel south), Corrientes, Entre Ríos, Buenos Aires, Córdoba, and Santiago del Estero. Together with Córdoba and Entre Ríos, the province is part of the economico-political association known as the Center Region.

Santa Fe's most important cities are Rosario (population 1,193,605), the capital Santa Fe (369,000), Rafaela (100,000), Reconquista (99,000) Villa Gobernador Gálvez (74,000), Venado Tuerto (69,000), and Santo Tomé (58,000).

== Demonym ==
Citizens of the province are known as santafesinos (fem. santafesinas).

== History ==
The aboriginal tribes who inhabited this region were the Tobas, Timbúes, Mocovíes, Pilagás, Guaycurúes, and Guaraníes. They were nomadic, lived from hunting, fishing and fruit recollection.

The first European settlement was established in 1527, at the confluence of the Paraná and Carcarañá rivers, when Sebastian Cabot, on his way to the north, founded a fort named Sancti Spiritus, which was destroyed two years later by the natives.

In 1573, Juan de Garay founded the city of Santa Fe in the surroundings of present town Cayastá, but the city was moved in 1651 and 1660 to its present location.

In 1812, the lawyer and general Manuel Belgrano created and displayed for the first time the Argentine flag on the banks of the Paraná River, at Rosario (by that time a small village), 160 km (99 mi) south of Santa Fe.

In 1815, while Alvear's central government fell due to Ignacio Álvarez Thomas' rebellion (at that time commander of an army sent to Santa Fe against Artigas), Francisco Candioti, the local militia chief, took over the government peacefully, thus starting the era of Santa Fe as an autonomous province. This period was short lived, since that same year Candioti died and central government reestablished the dependent government. However, in 1816, the caudillos Mariano Vera and Estanislao López deposed the governor delegate and proclaimed the sovereignty of the province and its membership into Artigas's Free Peoples League (Liga de Pueblos Libres).

López drew, in 1818, a provincial constitution of a strongly conservative flavour, after rejecting a project proposed by a provincial assembly; Santa Fe was the first province to have its constitution. During the civil strifes of 1820, Santa Fe troops were decisive in the defeat of Buenos Aires' centralist army. So, in time, López gradually became the Federation's Patriarch, establishing himself as the central figure of the Federal Party until his death in 1838.

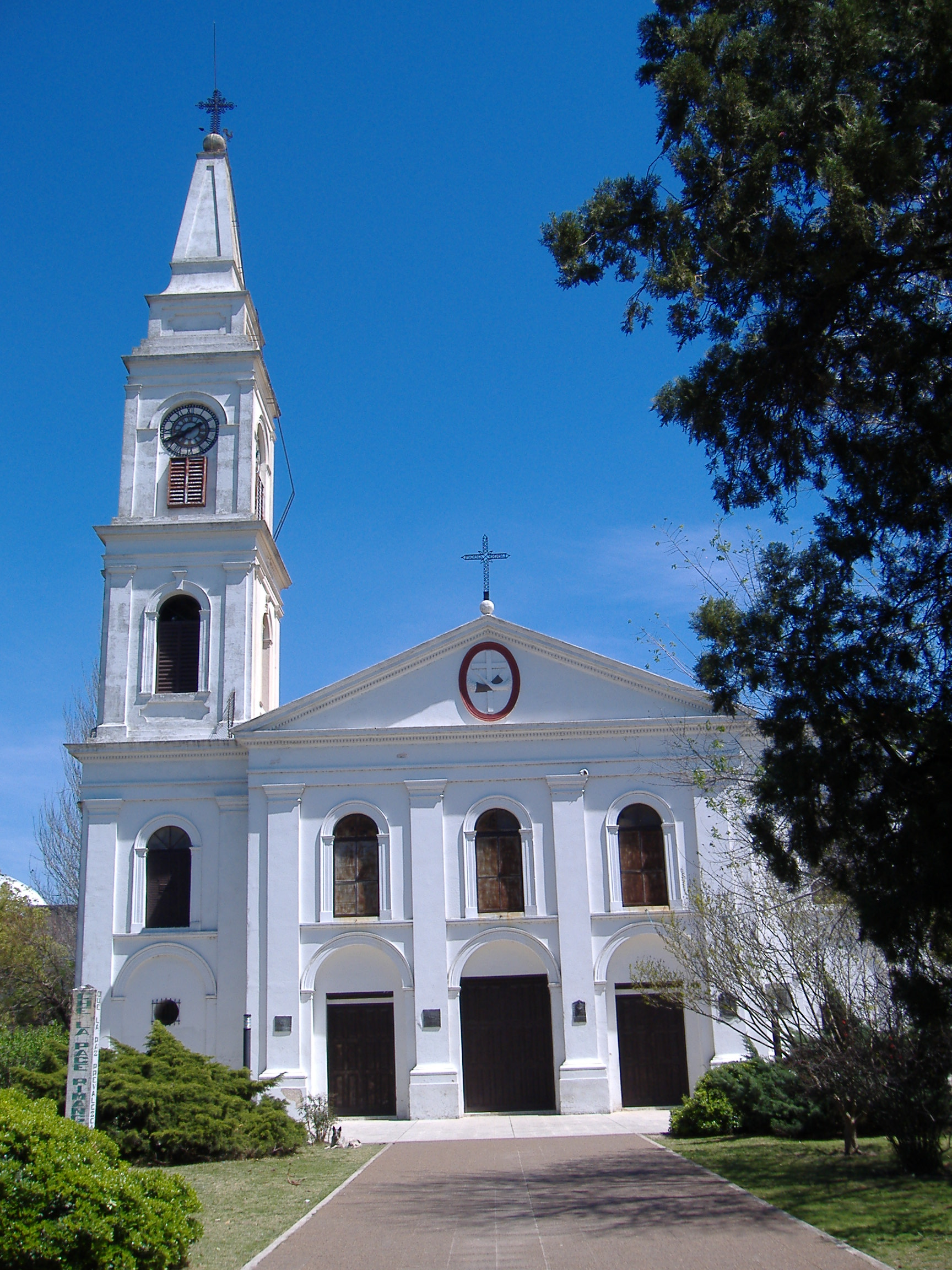
San Carlos Convent. The wounded were treated here during the 1813 Battle of San Lorenzo, the first in the War for Independence.

After López's death, his secretary and right-hand man José María Cullen was elected governor. However, Cullen being a potential rival of Buenos Aires governor and Confederation's Foreign Affairs Representative, Juan Manuel de Rosas, he sought and obtained Cullen's capture and execution, naming the pro-Rosas Juan Pablo López as governor. The new governor remained in power, alternating with Pascual Echagüe, until the province's invasion by Justo José de Urquiza's Great Army in 1851, and during his term the province adopted a new constitution in 1841.

After the organization of the nation, the province entered an era of peace and prosperity; in 1872 the railways already connected many points of the province, as well as the telegraph lines, and in 1889 the Provincial University of Santa Fe was founded.

The political hegemony of the conservative groups was challenged by the new ideas brought by the European immigrants, giving birth to the Radical Civic Union (UCR) and the Progressive Democratic Party (PDP), and the creation of the Argentine Agrarian Federation. These two parties had many strong electoral contests with the province's conservative parties.

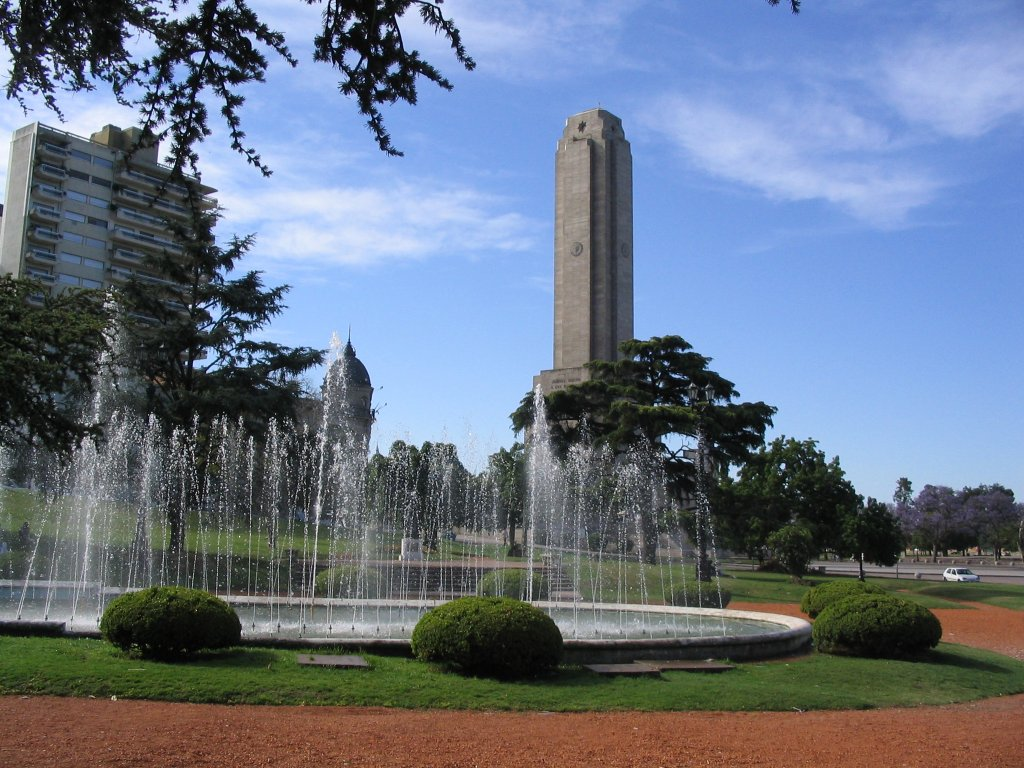
The National Flag Memorial, in Rosario

After the Electoral Reform of Roque Sáenz Peña in 1912, the UCR reached the government and stayed until the coup of 1930. During this time, more precisely in 1919, the National University of the Littoral was founded. In 1932, it was the PDP who got the governor's seat.

The contentious 1958 elections (from which Peronist candidates were barred) brought an ally of President-elect Arturo Frondizi to power in Santa Fe, Dr. Carlos Sylvestre Begnis. Gov. Begnis quickly steered budgets into sorely needed public works, most notably the construction of the Hernandarias Tunnel, a 10-mile (16 km)-long connection between the city of Santa Fe and neighboring Paraná. The tunnel, most of which runs under the massive Paraná River, is the longest in Argentina.

Forced to resign after conservative pressure drove President Frondizi from office in 1962, Begnis had the satisfaction of seeing Hernandarias open in 1969, and voters overwhelmingly return him to office in 1973 (this time as a Peronist).

Santa Fe suffered the violence of the late '70s and the depression of the 1980s more than most other provinces. It continued to languish economically during the prosperous 1990s, as the revalued Argentine peso put pressure on its productive sectors. Touching bottom around 2002, its economy has grown by 7% a year since then. The heart of Argentina's lucrative soy harvest, the province's importance has continued to grow, now rivaling Buenos Aires Province as the nation's leading agricultural producer, with Rosario as one of the most important ports in Argentina.

== Geography ==
Köppen climate map of Santa Fe Province

Most of the province consists of green flatlands, part of the humid Pampas, bordering to the north with the Gran Chaco region. There are low sierras to the west. The north has higher temperatures, with an annual average of 19 °C (66 °F) and precipitations of up to 1,100 millimetres (43 in) in the east, decreasing towards the west, where there is a distinctive dry season during the winter. The south presents lower temperatures, averaging 14 °C (57 °F), and slightly less precipitations. Summers are hot and humid throughout the province, with average highs ranging from 30 °C (86F) in the south to 34 °C (93F) in the northwest corner, and night temperatures between 17 °C (63F) in the south and 21 °C (70F) in the north. Thunderstorms are common, and so are heat waves what can bring temperatures up to 40 °C (104F) and hot muggy nights. These are often interrupted by cold fronts that bring crisp, cool weather from the south. March brings cooler nights in the south, and April brings comfortable weather, with highs ranging from 22 °C (72F) in the south to 26 °C (79F) in the north, and lows from 10 °C (50F) to 15 °C (59F). Frost arrives in May in the south, where it occurs frequently until September; in the extreme north, frost is much more sporadic: some years might bring frosty May days, on other years it may come in July, but generally speaking there will always be a few frosty days every year even in the extreme north. Winter is drier in the west of the province and wetter in the east. In the south, temperatures range from 15 °C (59F) in the day to 4 °C (39F) at night, whereas in the north, from 21 °C (70F) to 9 °C (48F). Cold waves often bring temperatures of -5 °C (23F) in the south, with extremes of -8 °C (18F) recorded; further north, the thermometer descends occasionally to -2 °C (28F) and very rarely to -5 °C (23F). There are often short warm periods of up to 30 °C (86F) during the winter, followed by much colder weather with drizzle and temperatures around 6 °C (43F). Spring starts as soon as the end of August in the north, with very warm weather already present by early October; in the south, nights remain cool until most of November. Generally speaking, spring is unpredictable, with heat waves followed by extended periods of cool weather, as well as dry spells followed by severe thunderstorms.

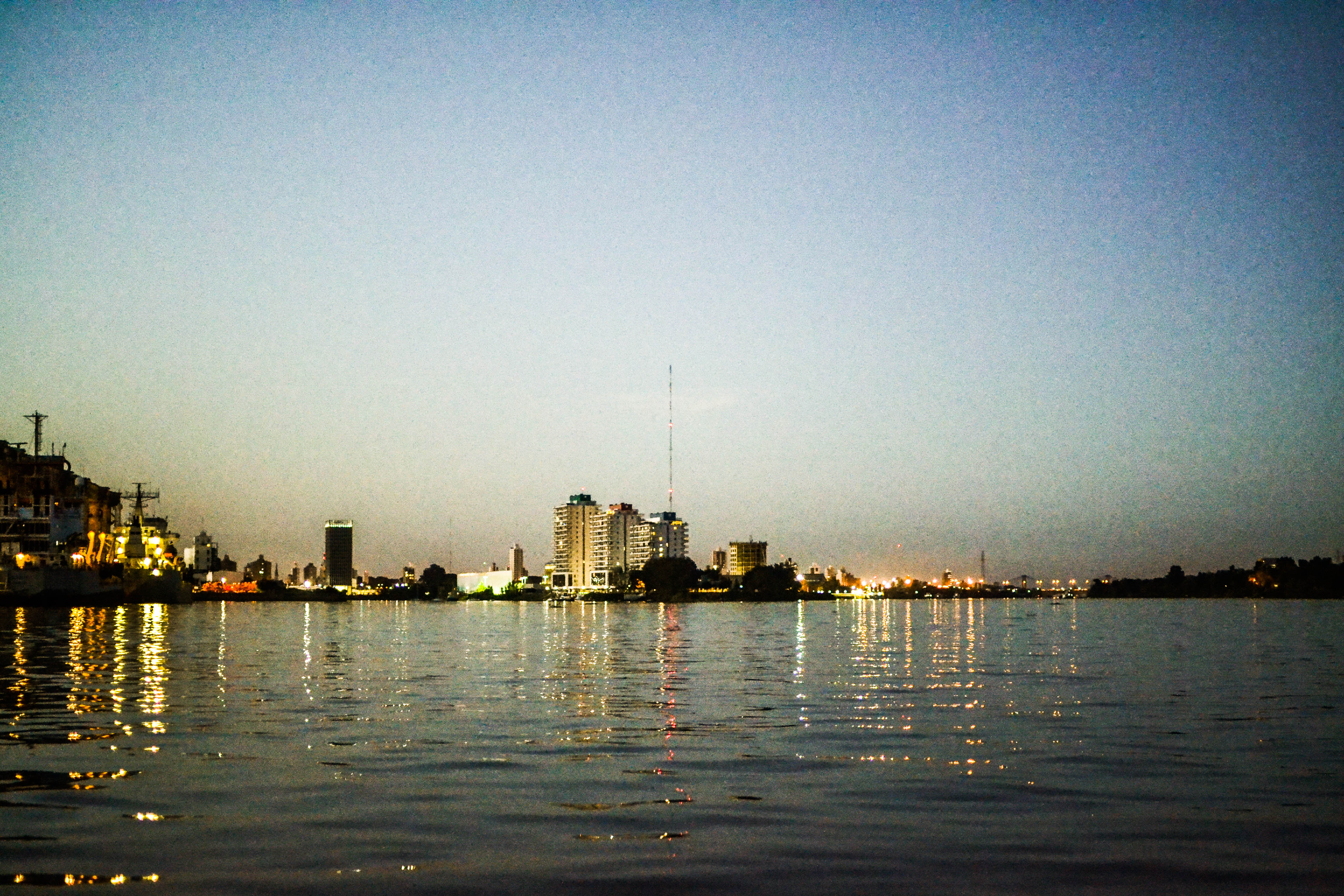
City of Santa Fe seen from the Paraná River

Rainfall ranges from 1,200 mm (47 in) in the northeast to 800 mm (31 in) in the southwest and extreme northwest. Snowfall is unprecedented in the northern two-thirds of the province, and very rare in the south, where the last occurrence was in 2007 with several centimeters accumulated. This humid, temperate climate explains why Central and Southern Santa Fe are among the nation's richest agricultural regions, with crops such as maize and soybeans popular, and a very well developed dairy industry.

The main river, and connection to open sea through the Río de la Plata is the Paraná River. There are also other tributaries to the Paraná including the Salado del Norte, the Carcarañá and the Arroyo del Medio. The plain lands tend to be flooded after heavy rains due to the growth of the Paraná and Salado rivers. In 2003, a rapid rise of the Salado produced a catastrophic flood of the capital and many communities in the north-center of the province, prompting the evacuation of no fewer than 100,000 people and major economic losses. In 2007, several days of heavy rainfall flooded more than 60 towns in the center and south of the province, including sections of Santa Fe and Rosario, causing tens of thousands of people to be evacuated, crop losses, and widespread damage to the physical infrastructure of the area.

== Economy ==
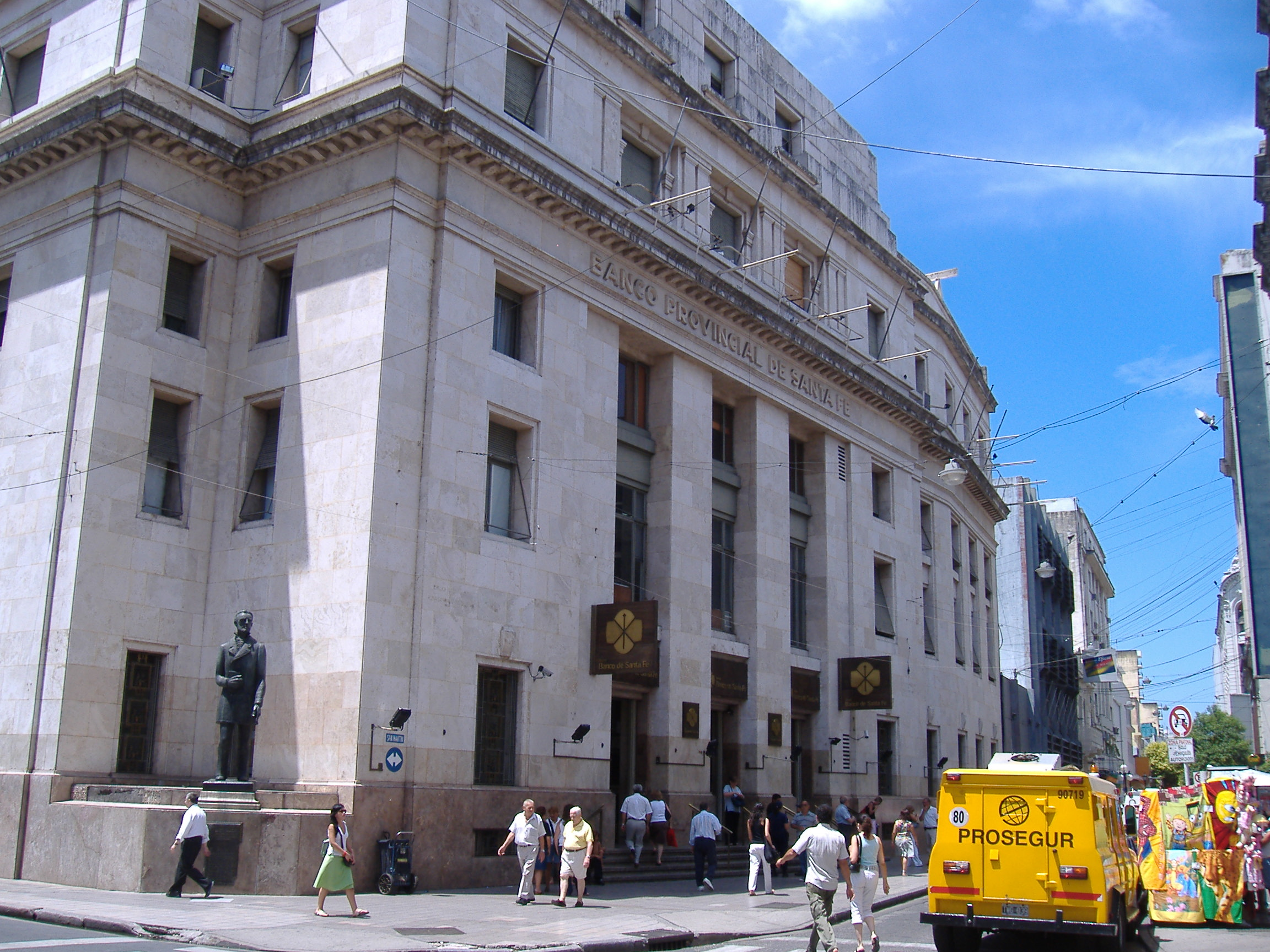
Headquarters of New Bank of Santa Fe, formerly the Provincial Bank

Santa Fe's economy is the fourth most important in the country, having been displaced from third place by neighboring Córdoba Province around 1970. Accounting for 8% of the Argentine total, its output was estimated at US$27 billion in 2006 (which shall be around US$43 billion in 2011 according to Argentina's economical growing), or, US$9,000 per capita (around US$13,000 in 2011), somewhat above the national average. Though the economy is well-diversified, agriculture continues to play an indispensable role through its profitability and foreign exchange earnings via exports. Twenty-one percent of the cultivated lands of Argentina are in Santa Fe, whose main crops are soybean (main national producer), sunflower, maize, wheat, and rice. In smaller scale strawberry, honey and derivatives (300,000 beehives), wood, and cotton are produced.

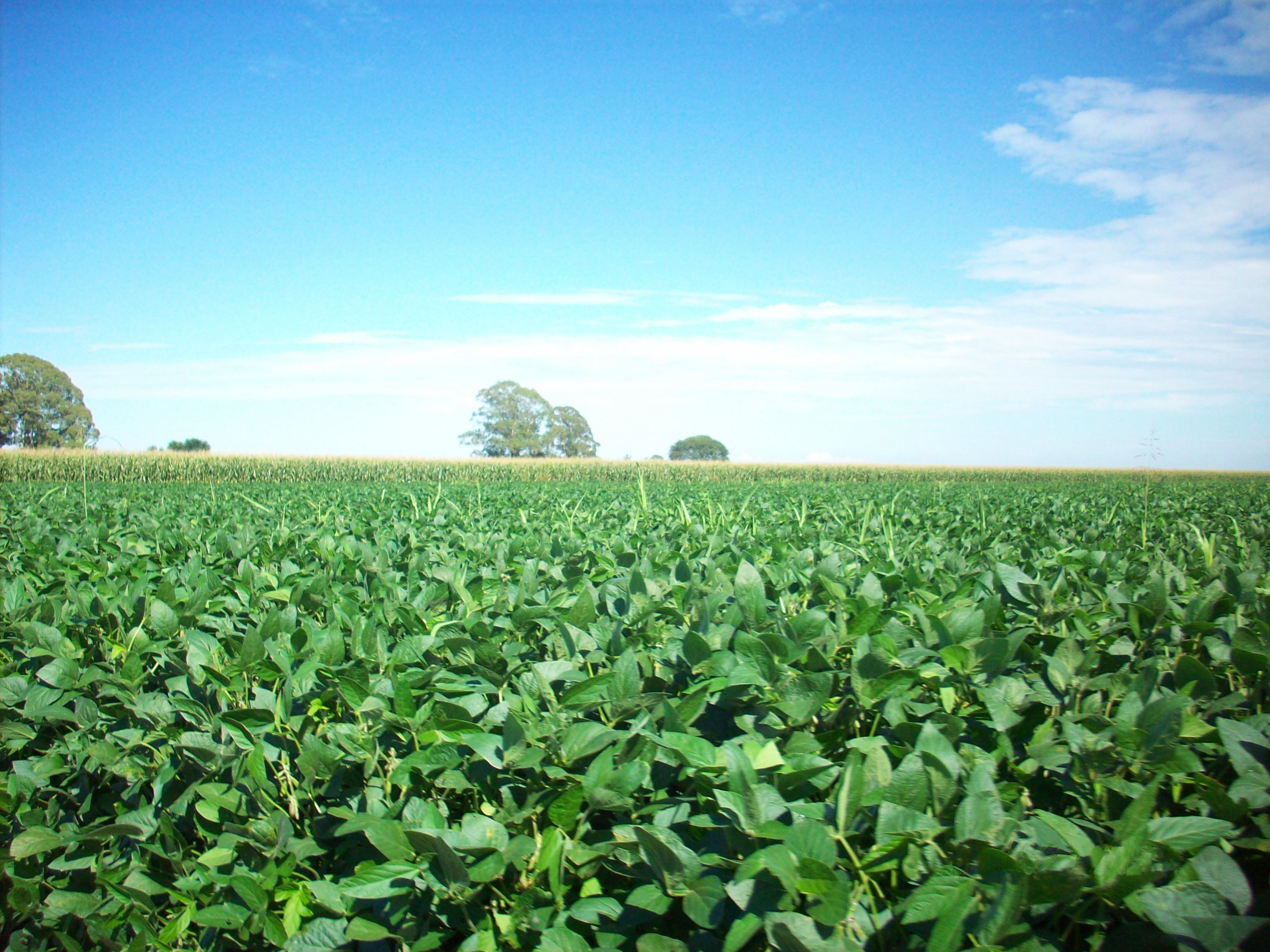
Soy fields near Runciman. The soy harvest, mostly for export, dominates Santa Fe agriculture.

The green grass of the province is ideal for the 6.5 million head of cattle (20% of national stock), which is not only source of meat but of 2.6 billion of liters of milk per year (40% of the national production), which is processed by over 5,000 dairies.

The ports between Rosario and San Lorenzo are departure points for the export of the production of the Santa Fe and many other provinces; through them leave 65% of the Argentine cereal and 55% of the country's exports. In 2004, Santa Fe's exports (US$7,170 million) accounted for 21% of the national total. Between 2001 and 2004 they increased 65.2%. Derivates of soybean, flours and vegetable oils comprised over US$2 billion and over 7.6 million tonnes. In 2005 the ports of southern Santa Fe shipped 60% of the grains, 93% of the agricultural subproducts and 85% of the vegetable oils exported by Argentina.

Manufacturing in Santa Fe represents 18% of its economy and is also among the top in Argentina. Mills that produce different flours and oils, beer, and other food industries, leather and textiles, hydrocarbon refineries, steel (1 million tonnes a year) and metals production, industrial and agricultural machines, car industry and others.

The services sector is well-developed and very diversified, relying little on tourism or the public sector. Tourism is not an important activity in spite of the wide range of hotels and restaurants. Rosario, home to the National Flag Memorial (Monumento Nacional a la Bandera) and a number of museums, receives a number of visitors from Argentina. The replica of the Sancti Spiritus Fort, the ruins of Cayastá and the city of Santa Fe are also common destinations.

== Government ==
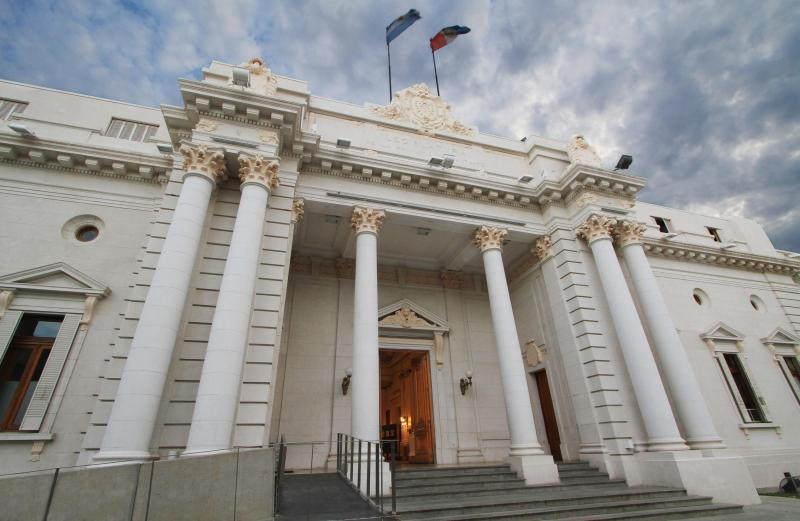
Legislature of Santa Fe

The provincial government is divided into the usual three branches: the executive, headed by a governor, popularly elected for non-reelegible four-year terms, who appoint the cabinet; the legislative, formed by a bicameral legislature (a 50-member Chamber of Deputies and a 19-member Senate, all elected for four-year terms); and the judiciary, headed by the Supreme Court and completed by several inferior tribunals.

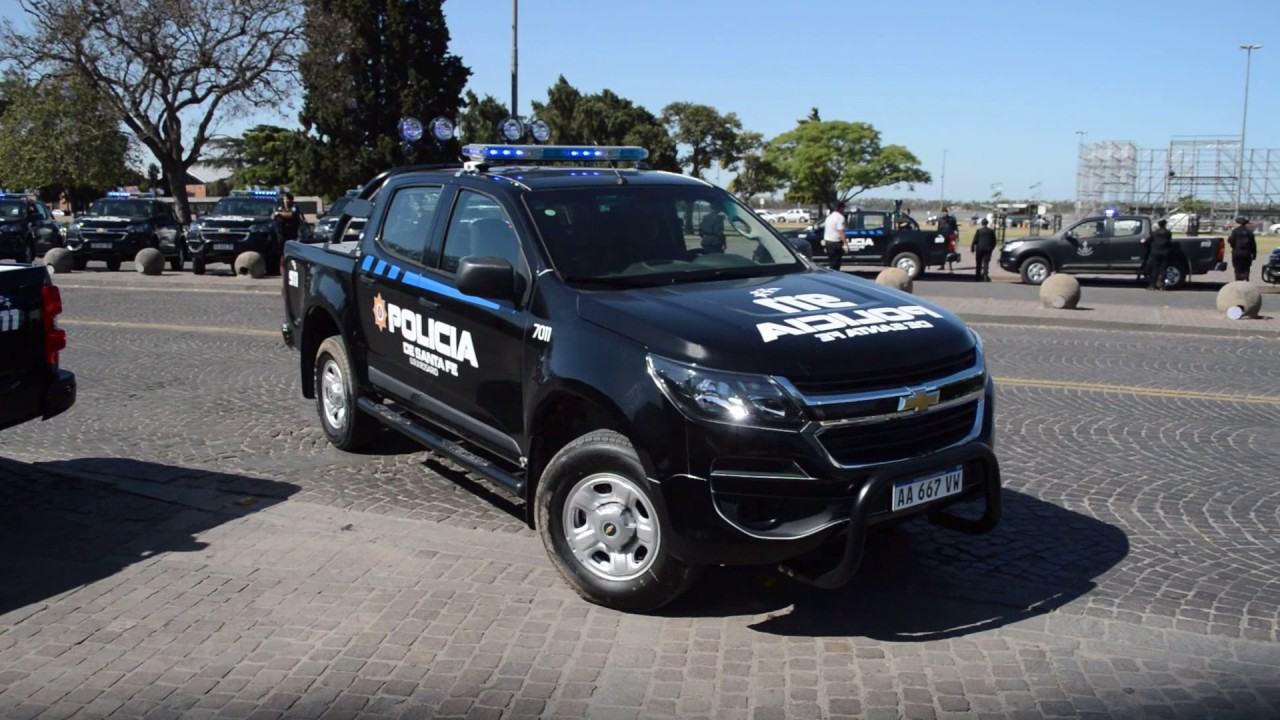
Santa Fe Provincial Police

The Constitution of Santa Fe Province forms the formal law of the province.

From 1991, the executive and legislative officials were elected in single-round elections by a controversial system known as the Ley de Lemas. This system was abolished in 2004; the new one includes compulsory primary elections, which were held for the first time in August 2005, with good results according to most analysis. The parliamentary elections of 23 October 2005 were the first main elections to be held after the abolition of the Ley de Lemas.

In Argentina, the most important law enforcement organization is the Argentine Federal Police but the additional work is carried out by the Santa Fe Provincial Police.

== Demographics ==
Santa Fe population pyramid (2022 census).

Ethno-racial groups in Santa Fe (2022 census)
1. Undeclared (97.9%)
2. Native (1.60%)
3. Black (0.50%)

According to the 2022 Argentine national census, the Province of Santa Fe has 3,556,522 inhabitants. The origin of the population is majority European, descended from the great wave of immigration from 1850 to 1950, being Italians (mainly from Piedmont), Spanish, Swiss and Germans the main ethnic groups in the province. Since 1970, Rosario has been chosen by internal migrants, mainly from the north of Santa Fe and the northern provinces. A smaller minority of the population (20%) are Mestizos and an even lesser number (2-4%) are of full Amerindian descent.

=== Population distribution ===
Urban and rural population
	1980	1991	2001
Urban area	2.022.790	2.429.291	2.675.392
Rural area	442.756	369.131	325.309

=== Evolution ===
Historical evolution of the population of the province:

- XVIII cent.: 12,000
- 1820: 15,000-20,000
- 1847: 20,000
- 1853: 30,000
- 1869: 89,117
- 1895: 397,188
- 1914: 899,640
- 1947: 1,702,975
- 1960: 1,884,918
- 1970: 2,135,583

== Administrative division ==
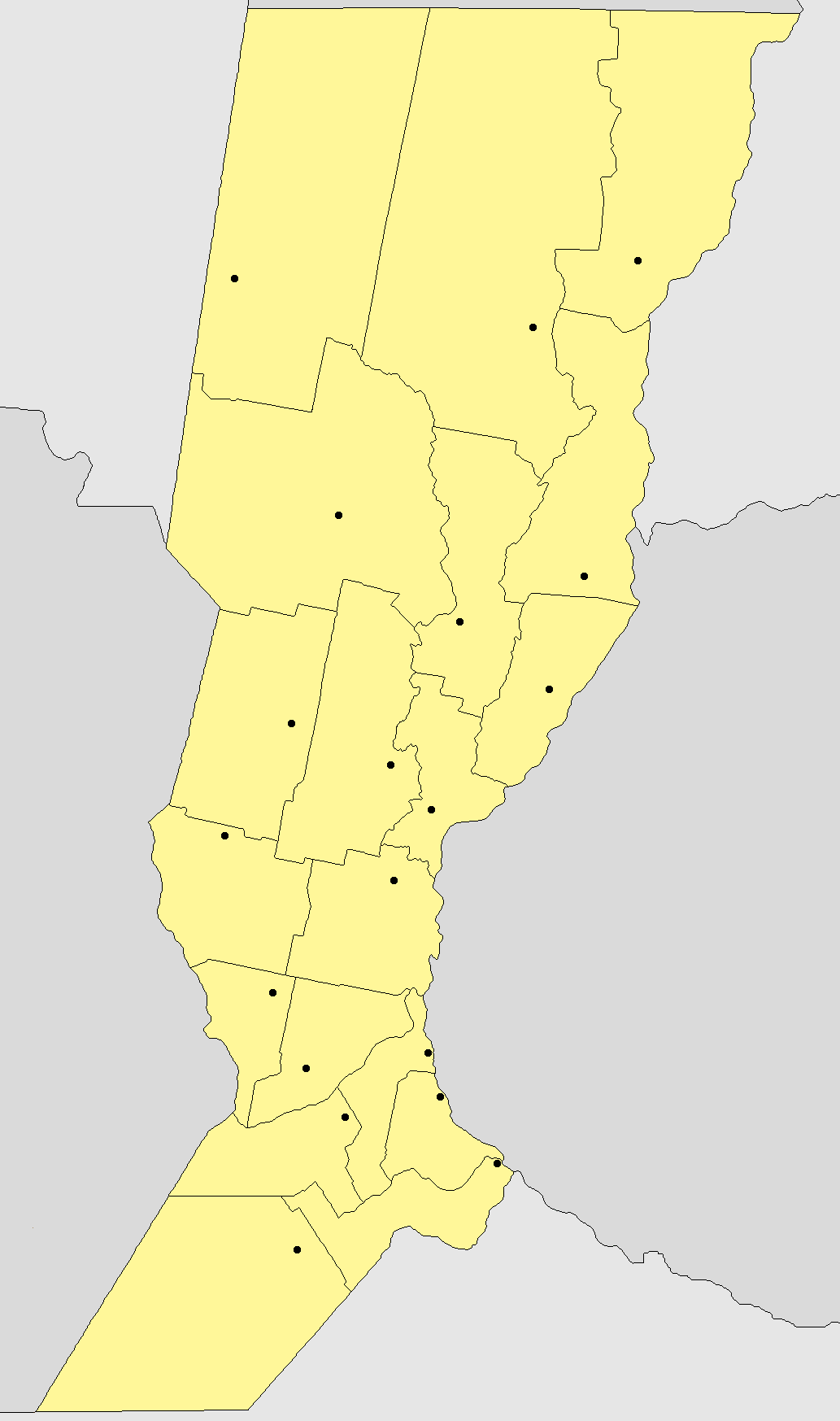
Simplified political map of Santa Fe Province, showing departmental borders and head towns

The province is divided into 19 departments (in Spanish, departamentos), and the departments are divided in districts which can be organized as communes or municipalities. The communes are smaller towns, generally administered by a local commission led by a "communal president". The municipalities, which must have more than 10,000 inhabitants, are what is commonly called "cities". Municipalities have an executive officer (a mayor, called intendente) and a legislative body (called Concejo Municipal, a deliberative council). For administrative purposes, each department has a head town (cabecera), which may be either kind of district.

Department	Population	Area	Head town
Belgrano	41,449	2,386 km^{2} (921 sq mi)	Las Rosas
Caseros	79,096	3,449 km^{2} (1,332 sq mi)	Casilda
Castellanos	162,165	6,600 km^{2} (2,500 sq mi)	Rafaela
Constitución	83,045	3,225 km^{2} (1,245 sq mi)	Villa Constitución
Garay	19,913	3,964 km^{2} (1,531 sq mi)	Helvecia
General López	182,113	11,558 km^{2} (4,463 sq mi)	Melincué
General Obligado	166,436	10,928 km^{2} (4,219 sq mi)	Reconquista
Iriondo	65,486	3,184 km^{2} (1,229 sq mi)	Cañada de Gómez
La Capital	489,505	3,055 km^{2} (1,180 sq mi)	Santa Fe
Las Colonias	95,202	6,439 km^{2} (2,486 sq mi)	Esperanza
Nueve de Julio	28,273	16,870 km^{2} (6,510 sq mi)	Tostado
Rosario	1,342,301	1,890 km^{2} (730 sq mi)	Rosario
San Cristóbal	64,935	14,850 km^{2} (5,730 sq mi)	San Cristóbal
San Javier	29,912	6,929 km^{2} (2,675 sq mi)	San Javier
San Jerónimo	77,253	4,282 km^{2} (1,653 sq mi)	Coronda
San Justo	40,379	5,575 km^{2} (2,153 sq mi)	San Justo
San Lorenzo	142,097	1,867 km^{2} (721 sq mi)	San Lorenzo
San Martín	60,698	4,860 km^{2} (1,880 sq mi)	Sastre
Vera	51,303	21,096 km^{2} (8,145 sq mi)	Vera

== Notable natives ==
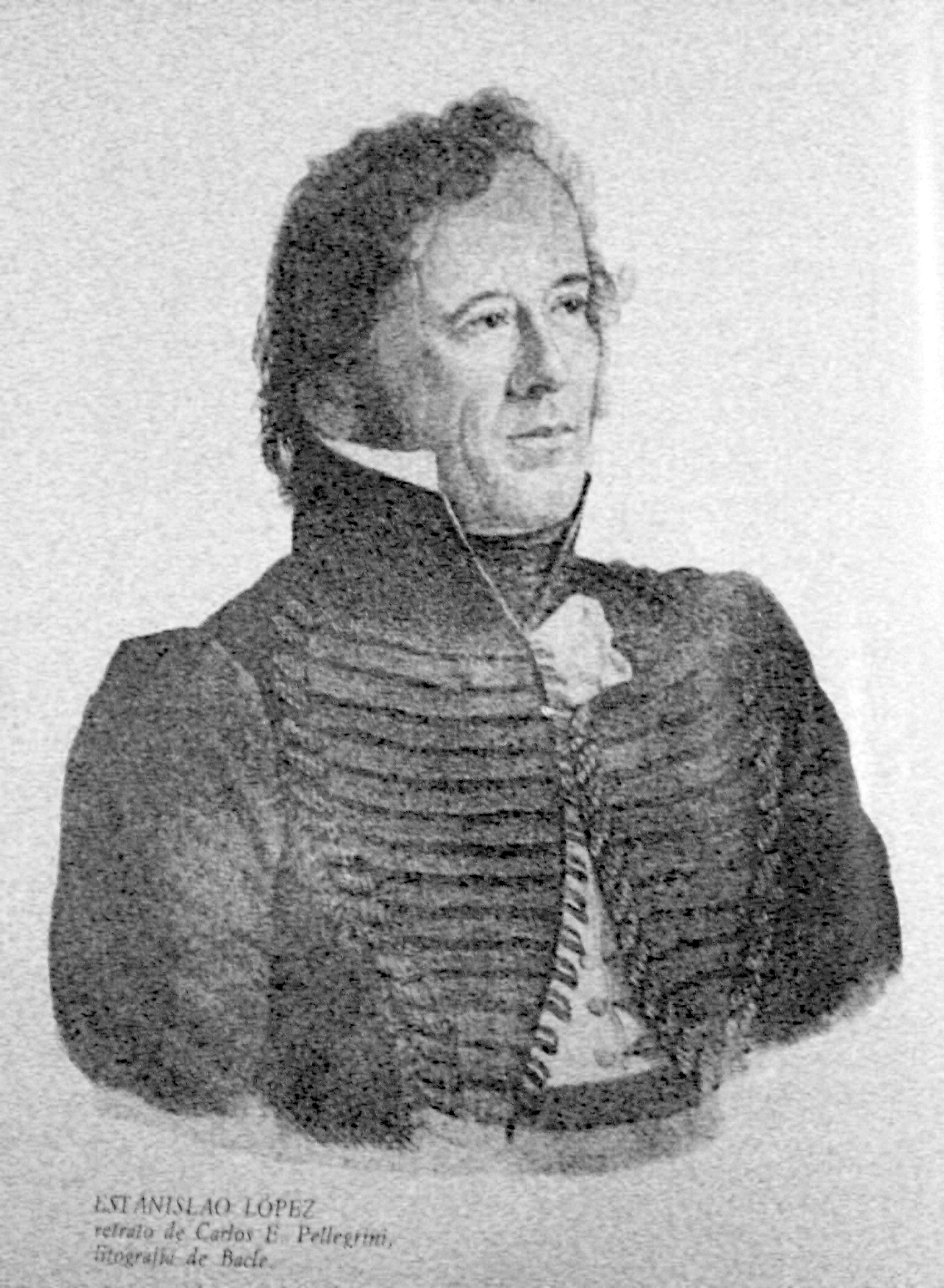
Estanislao López (1786–1838), after Charles Pellegrini

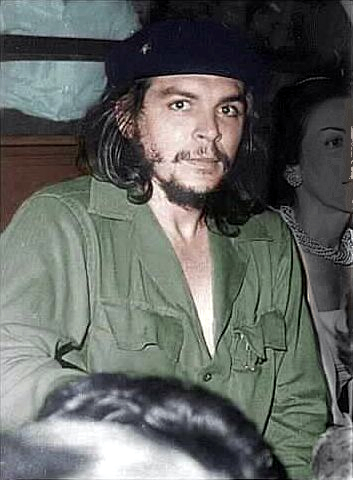
Ernesto "Che" Guevara

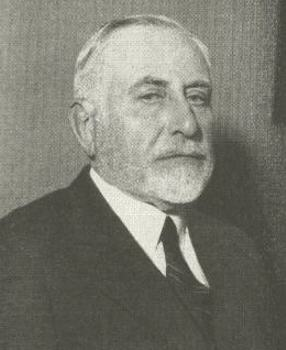
Lisandro de la Torre

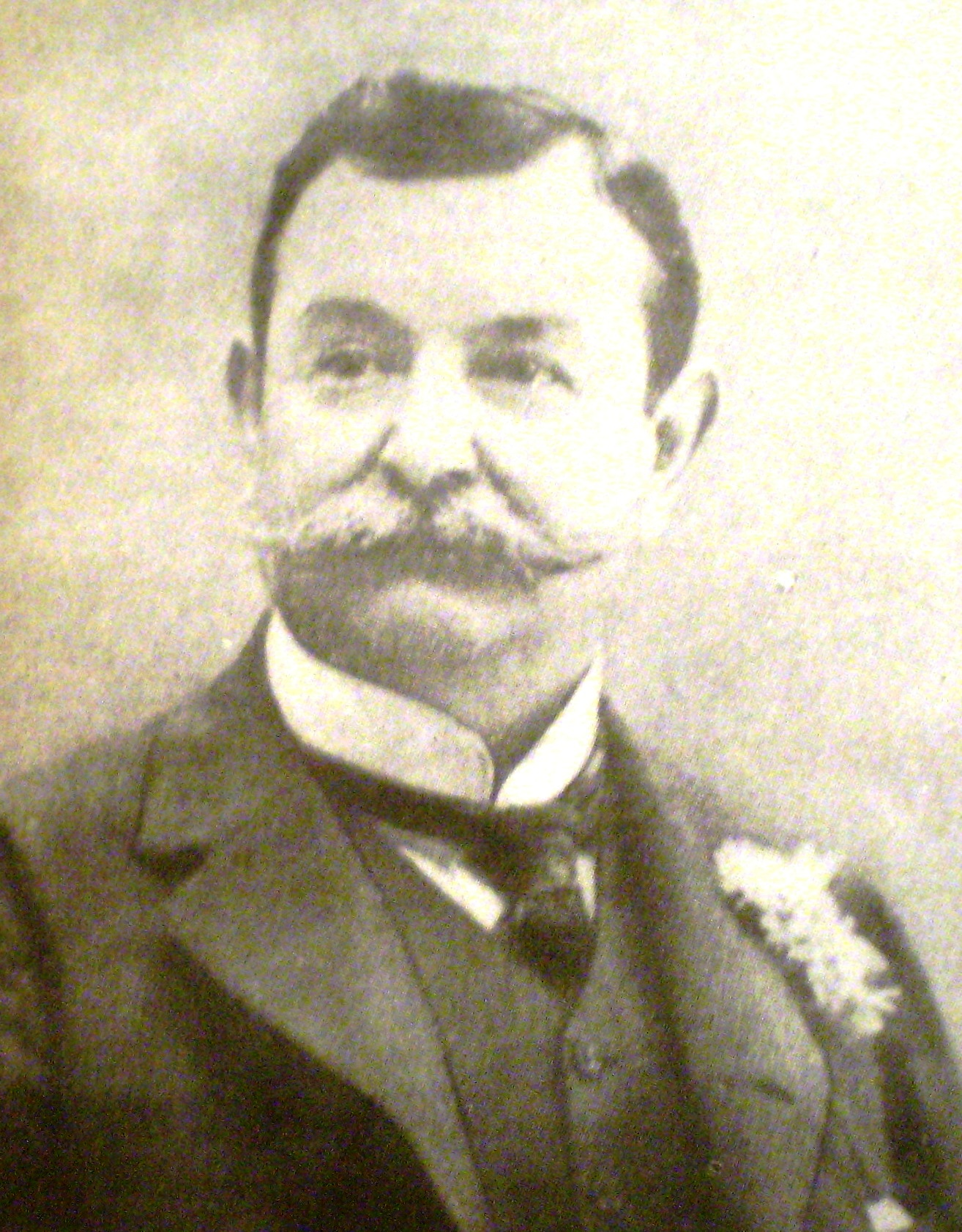
Estanislao Zeballos

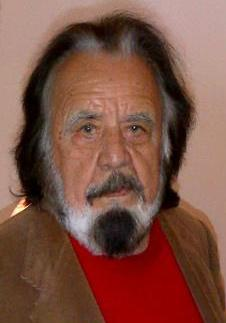
Horacio Guarany

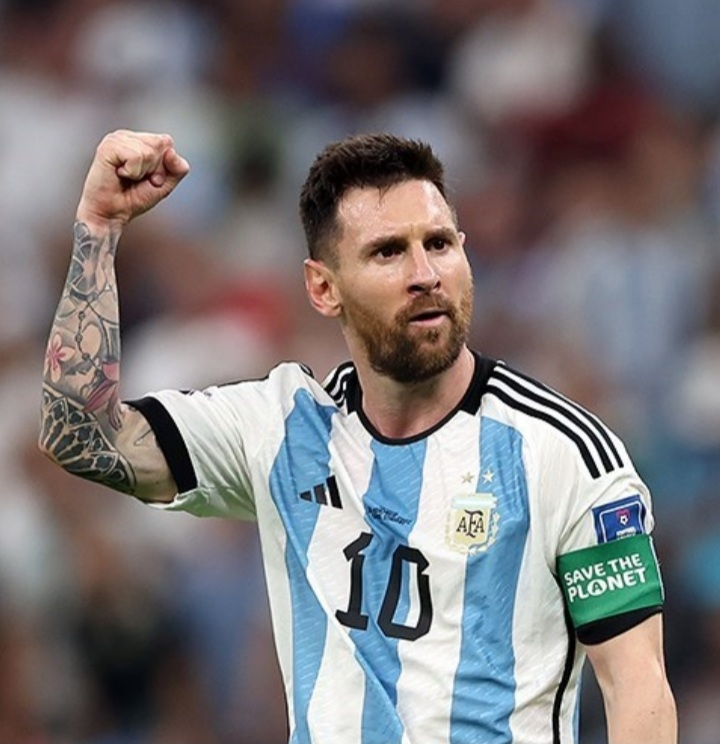
Lionel Messi

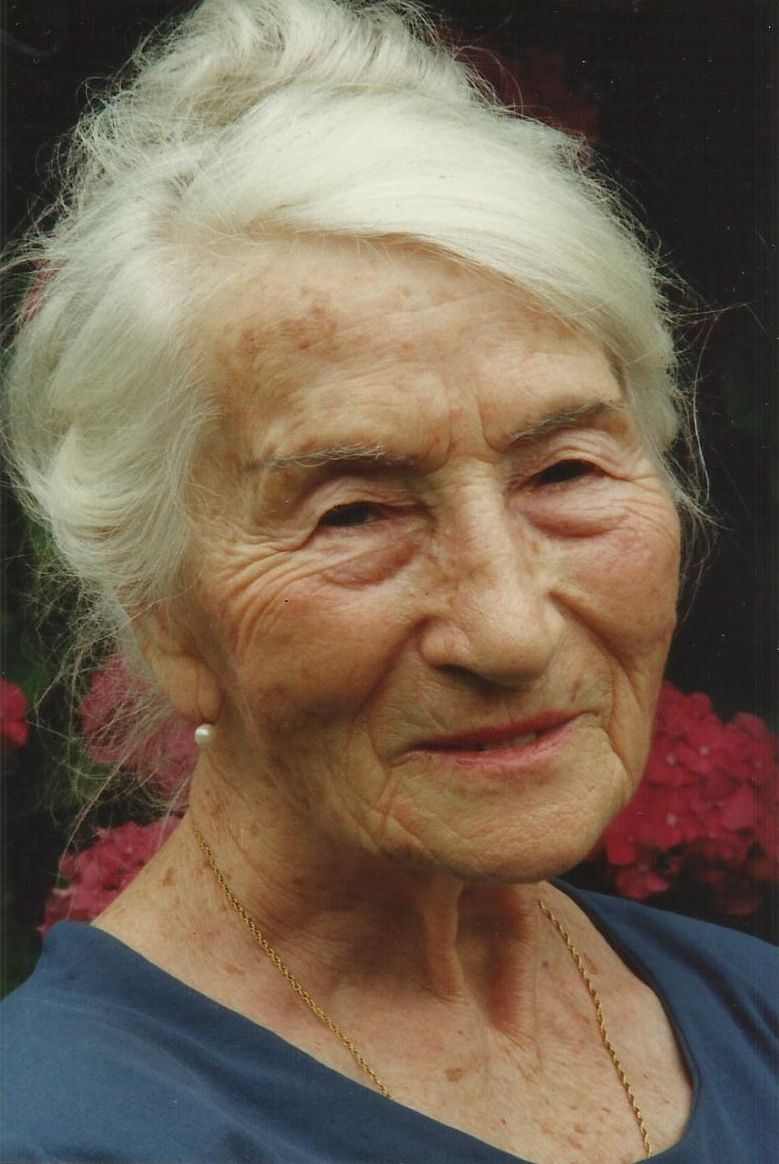
Leticia Cossettini

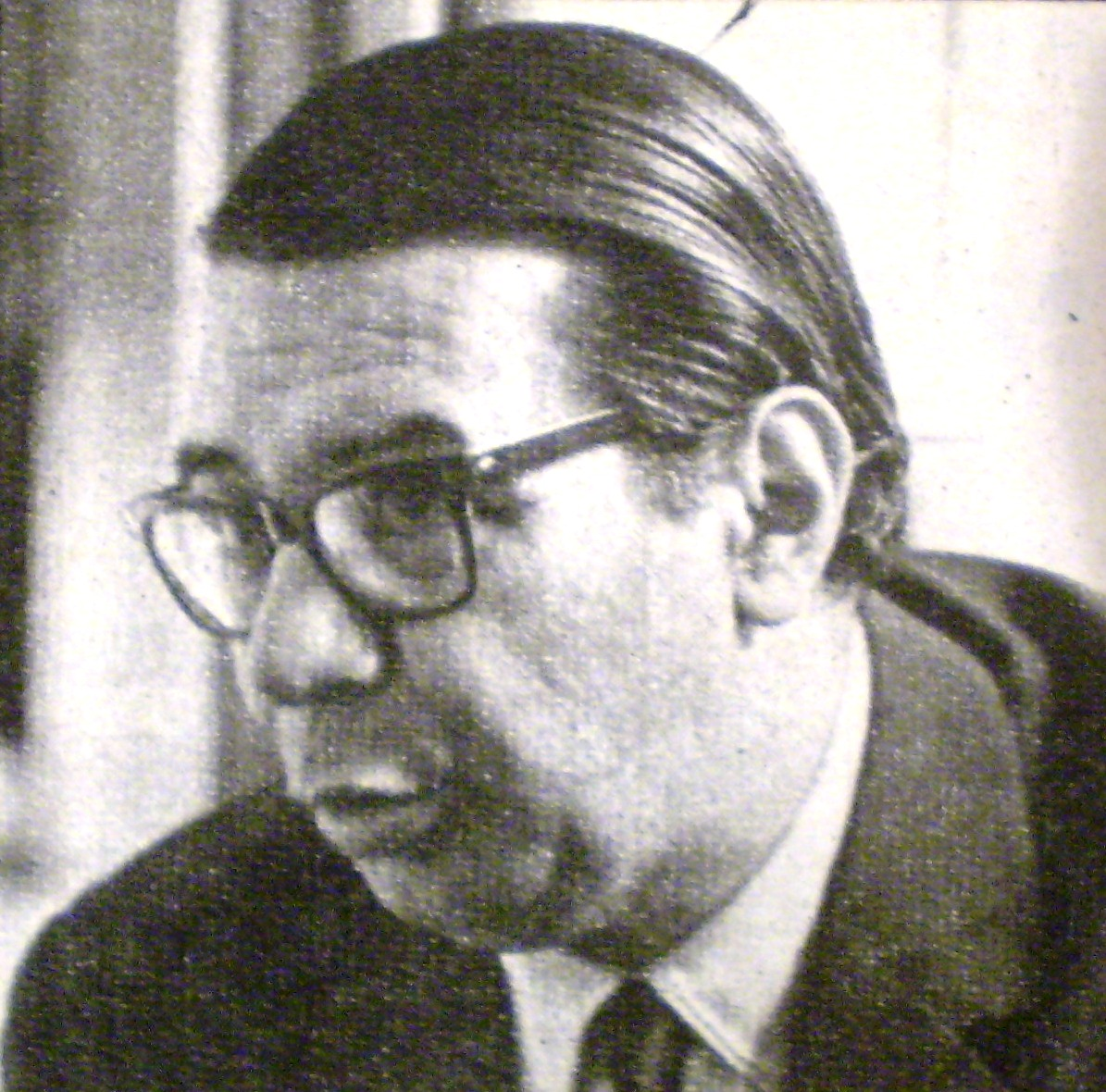
Ariel Ramírez

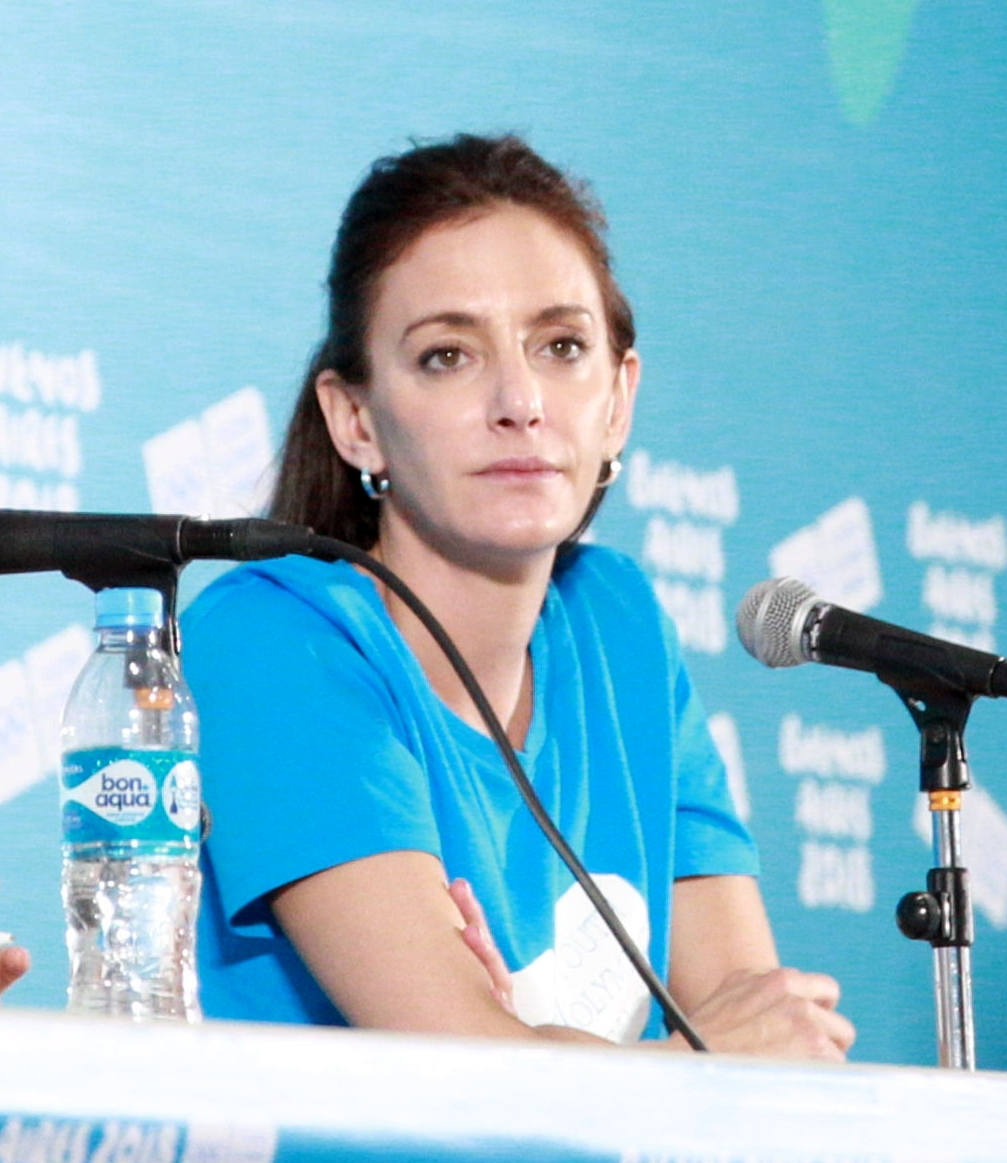
Luciana Aymar

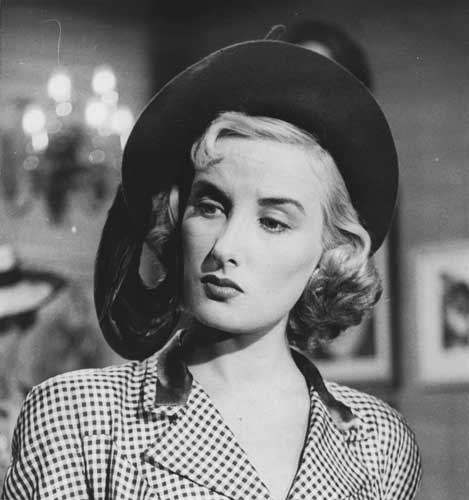
Mirtha Legrand, 1949

- Roberto Abbondanzieri goalkeeper.
- Lucas Alario footballer.
- Alberto J. Armando president of Boca Juniors F.C..
- Franco Armani goalkeeper.
- Luciana Aymar hockey player.
- Osvaldo Bayer writer.
- Juan Carlos Baglietto singer and musician.
- Carlos Baldomir boxer.
- Éver Banega footballer.
- Gato Barbieri jazz musician and composer.
- Gabriel Batistuta footballer.
- Sebastián Battaglia footballer.
- Edgardo Bauza football player and manager.
- Antonio Berni figurative artist.
- Marcelo Bielsa football player and manager.
- Fernando Birri film maker.
- Liliana Bodoc novelist.
- José Bonaparte palaeontologist.
- Norman Briski actor.
- Nicolas Brussino basketball player.
- Alejandro Bulgheroni oil entrepreneur.
- Chris de Burgh, singer
- Amadeo Carrizo goalkeeper.
- Germán Chiaraviglio pole vaulter.
- Leticia Cossettini educator.
- Linda Cristal actress.
- Juan Martín Coggi boxer.
- Guillermo Coria tennis player.
- Ángel Correa footballer.
- Luciano De Cecco volleyball player.
- Carlos Delfino basketball player.
- Cesar Delgado footballer.
- Ángel Di María footballer.
- Pascual Echagüe (1797–1867), politician
- Alejandro Fantino television host.
- Jorge Faurie diplomat and politician.
- Luciano Figueroa footballer.
- Roberto Fontanarrosa strip cartoonist.
- Tayavek Gallizzi basketball player.
- Cecilia Gentili transgender activist, author, and actress.
- Leon Gieco folk rock performer.
- Gastón Gori essayist and poet.
- Darío Grandinetti actor.
- Santiago Grassi swimmer.
- Horacio Guarany folk singer.
- Ernesto "Che" Guevara revolutionary.
- Walter Herrmann basketball player.
- Mauro Icardi footballer.
- Juan Imhoff Rugby union footballer.
- Libertad Lamarque actress.
- Ezequiel Lavezzi footballer.
- Raúl Lavié tango singer.
- Mirtha Legrand actress and television presenter.
- Estanislao López (1786–1838) caudillo and governor of the province of Santa Fe.
- Leopoldo Luque football player.
- Julio Macat cinematographer.
- Agustín Magaldi tango singer.
- Marcos Maidana boxer.
- Esteban Laureano Maradona philanthropist.
- Gerardo Martino football player and manager.
- Javier Mascherano football player and coach.
- Valeria Mazza model.
- César Luis Menotti football player and manager.
- Lionel Messi football player.
- Carlos Monzon boxer.
- Marcos Mundstock of Les Luthiers musico-comedy act.
- Litto Nebbia rock performer.
- Nicki Nicole rapper and singer.
- Andrés Nocioni basketball player.
- Alberto Olmedo comedian.
- Fito Páez singer and performer.
- Horacio Pagani (auto executive).
- Los Palmeras cumbia band.
- Soledad Pastorutti folk singer.
- José Pedroni poet.
- Carlota Garrido de la Peña journalist
- Rogelio Pfirter diplomat.
- Juan Antonio Pizzi football player and manager.
- Mauricio Pochettino football player and manager.
- Nadia Podoroska tennis player.
- Leonardo Ponzio footballer.
- Sebastián Porto motorcycle racer.
- Nery Pumpido football player and manager.
- Ariel Ramírez composer and musician.
- Carlos Reutemann racing driver and politician.
- Rubén Rézola sprint canoeist.
- Maxi Rodríguez footballer.
- Sergio Rubin biographer of Pope Francis.
- Juan José Saer writer.
- Lionel Scaloni football player and manager.
- Hugo Sconochini basketball player.
- Coti Sorokin singer.
- Ricardo Supisiche painter and engraver.
- Lisandro de la Torre politician.
- Virginia Tola soprano.
- Carlos Thompson cine actor.
- Francisco Urondo writer and Montonero.
- Jorge Valdano football player and manager.
- Julio César Vásquez boxer.
- Mariano Vera (1780–1840), caudillo.
- Nelly Vuksic conductor and singer.
- Spreen, number one streamer by Argentina and top international
- Dorothy Maud Wrinch mathematician.
- Juan Carlos Zabala long-distance runner.
- Pedro E. Zadunaisky astronomer.
- Estanislao Zeballos writer and politician.
