= 1999 in Argentina =

- Decades: 1970s; 1980s; 1990s; 2000s; 2010s
- See also: Other events of 1999; List of years in Argentina

Events from the year 1999 in Argentina

== Incumbents ==
- President:
  - Carlos Menem (1 January – 10 December)
  - Fernando de la Rúa (from 10 December)
- Vice President:
  - Carlos Ruckauf (1 January – 10 December)
  - Carlos Álvarez (from 10 December)

=== Governors ===
- Governor of Buenos Aires Province:
  - Eduardo Duhalde (until 10 December)
  - Carlos Ruckauf (from 10 December)
- Governor of Catamarca Province:
  - Arnoldo Castillo (until 10 December)
  - Oscar Castillo (from 10 December)
- Governor of Chaco Province: Ángel Rozas
- Governor of Chubut Province:
  - Carlos Maestro
  - José Luis Lizurume
- Governor of Córdoba:
  - Ramón Mestre (until 12 July)
  - José Manuel De la Sota (from 12 July)
- Governor of Corrientes Province:
  - Pedro Braillard Poccard (until 19 June)
  - Hugo Perié (19 June-17 December)
  - Ramón Mestre (from 17 December)
- Governor of Entre Ríos Province:
  - Jorge Busti (until 11 December)
  - Sergio Montiel (from 11 December)
- Governor of Formosa Province: Gildo Insfrán
- Governor of Jujuy Province: Eduardo Fellner
- Governor of La Pampa Province: Rubén Marín
- Governor of La Rioja Province: Ángel Maza
- Governor of Mendoza Province:
  - Arturo Lafalla (until 10 December)
  - Roberto Iglesias (from 10 December)
- Governor of Misiones Province:
  - Ramón Puerta (until 10 December)
  - Carlos Rovira (from 10 December)
- Governor of Neuquén Province: Felipe Sapag
- Governor of Río Negro Province: Pablo Verani
- Governor of Salta Province: Juan Carlos Romero
- Governor of San Juan Province:
  - Jorge Escobar (until 10 December)
  - Alfredo Avelín (from 10 December)
- Governor of San Luis Province: Adolfo Rodríguez Saá
- Governor of Santa Cruz Province: Néstor Kirchner
- Governor of Santa Fe Province:
  - Jorge Obeid (until 10 December)
  - Carlos Reutemann (from 10 December)
- Governor of Santiago del Estero: Carlos Juárez
- Governor of Tierra del Fuego: José Arturo Estabillo
- Governor of Tucumán:
  - Antonio Domingo Bussi (until 29 October)
  - Julio Miranda (from 29 October)

=== Vice Governors ===
- Vice Governor of Buenos Aires Province:
  - Rafael Romá (until 10 December)
  - Felipe Solá (from 10 December)
- Vice Governor of Catamarca Province:
  - Simón Hernández (until 10 December)
  - Hernán Colombo (from 10 December)
- Vice Governor of Chaco Province:
  - Miguel Pibernus (until 10 December)
  - Roy Nikisch (from 10 December)
- Vice Governor of Corrientes Province:
  - Victor Hugo Maidana (until 19 June)
  - Vacant (from 19 June)
- Vice Governor of Entre Rios Province:
  - Héctor Alanis (until 11 December)
  - Edelmiro Tomás Pauletti (from 11 December)
- Vice Governor of Formosa Province: Floro Bogado
- Vice Governor of Jujuy Province:
  - Vacant (until 10 December)
  - Rubén Daza (from 10 December)
- Vice Governor of La Pampa Province:
  - Manuel Baladrón (until 10 December)
  - Heriberto Mediza (from 10 December)
- Vice Governor of La Rioja Province:
  - Miguel Ángel Asís (until 10 December)
  - Luis Beder Herrera (from 10 December)
- Vice Governor of Misiones Province:
  - Julio Alberto Ifrán (until 10 December)
  - Mercedes Margarita Oviedo (from 10 December)
- Vice Governor of Nenquen Province:
  - Ricardo Corradi (until 10 December)
  - Jorge Sapag (from 10 December)
- Vice Governor of Rio Negro Province: Bautista Mendioroz
- Vice Governor of Salta Province: Walter Wayar
- Vice Governor of San Juan Province:
  - Rogelio Rafael Cerdera (until 10 December)
  - Wbaldino Acosta (from 10 December)
- Vice Governor of San Luis Province:
  - Mario Merlo (until 10 December)
  - María Alicia Lemme (from 10 December)
- Vice Governor of Santa Cruz:
  - Eduardo Arnold (until 10 December)
  - Sergio Acevedo (from 10 December)
- Vice Governor of Santa Fe Province:
  - Gualberto Venesia (until 10 December)
  - Marcelo Muniagurria (from 10 December)
- Vice Governor of Santiago del Estero:
  - Darío Moreno (until 10 December)
  - Mercedes Aragonés de Juárez (from 10 December)
- Vice Governor of Tierra del Fuego: Miguel Ángel Castro

== Events ==
=== January ===
- 18 January: The Argentine peso continues to decline in value against the U.S. dollar, which is a source of concern for both businesses and individuals. There is talk of abandoning the Argentine peso for the US dollar.

=== May ===
- 13 May: Ricardo Gangeme, a prominent journalist known for exposing corruption, is found murdered in Trelew, Chubut Province.

=== August ===
- 31 August: A Líneas Aéreas Privadas Argentinas flight crashes during takeoff from Aeroparque Jorge Newbery. There are 65 fatalities (63 occupants of the aircraft and 2 on the ground) – as well as injuries, some serious, to at least 34 people.

=== September ===
- 17 September: Armed robbers take six Banco de la Nación Argentina employees hostage in Ramallo, Buenos Aires. After several hours, the thieves try to escape in a car with three hostages (the bank manager and an accountant). After a few meters, a special group of the provincial police, kill one of the suspects and the two hostages.

=== October ===
- 24 October: Argentine general elections are held with Fernando de la Rúa (Radical Civic Union) winning the Presidency with 48% of the vote, defeating Eduardo Duhalde (Peronist Party).

== Deaths ==
=== January ===
- 1 January – Rafael Iglesias, heavyweight boxer (b. 1924)
- 14 January – Sabina Olmos, actress (b. 1913)

=== March ===
- 8 March – Adolfo Bioy Casares, writer, journalist, and translator (b. 1914)

=== May ===
- 13 May – Ricardo Gangeme, journalist (b. 1943)

=== December ===
- 3 December – Enrique Cadícamo, tango lyricist, poet and novelist (b. 1900)

== See also ==
- List of Argentine films of 1999
