= 1990 in Argentina =

- Decades: 1970s; 1980s; 1990s; 2000s; 2010s
- See also: Other events of 1990; List of years in Argentina

Events from the year 1990 in Argentina

== Incumbents ==
- President: Carlos Menem
- Vice President: Eduardo Duhalde

=== Governors ===
- Governor of Buenos Aires Province: Antonio Cafiero
- Governor of Catamarca Province: Ramón Saadi
- Governor of Chaco Province: Danilo Baroni
- Governor of Chubut Province: Néstor Perl then Fernando Cosentino
- Governor of Córdoba: Ricardo Guillermo Leconte
- Governor of Corrientes Province: Ricardo Guillermo Leconte
- Governor of Entre Ríos Province: Jorge Busti
- Governor of Formosa Province: Vicente Joga
- Governor of Jujuy Province:
  - Ricardo de Aparici (until 7 November)
  - Eduardo Alderete (from 7 November)
- Governor of La Pampa Province: Néstor Ahuad
- Governor of La Rioja Province: Agustín de la Vega
- Governor of Mendoza Province: José Octavio Bordón
- Governor of Misiones Province: Julio César Humada
- Governor of Neuquén Province: Pedro Salvatori
- Governor of Río Negro Province: Horacio Massaccesi
- Governor of Salta Province: Hernán Cornejo
- Governor of San Juan Province: Carlos Enrique Gómez Centurión
- Governor of San Luis Province: Adolfo Rodríguez Saá
- Governor of Santa Cruz Province:
  - Ricardo del Val (until 6 July)
  - José Ramón Granero (from 6 July)
- Governor of Santa Fe Province: Víctor Reviglio
- Governor of Santiago del Estero: César Iturre
- Governor of Tucumán: José Domato

=== Vice Governors ===
- Vice Governor of Buenos Aires Province: Luis María Macaya
- Vice Governor of Catamarca Province: Oscar Garbe
- Vice Governor of Chaco Province: Emilio Carrara
- Vice Governor of Corrientes Province: Gabriel Feris
- Vice Governor of Entre Rios Province: Domingo Daniel Rossi
- Vice Governor of Formosa Province: Gildo Insfrán
- Vice Governor of Jujuy Province:
  - Eduardo Alderete (until 7 November)
  - Vacant (from 7 November)
- Vice Governor of La Pampa Province: Edén Cavallero
- Vice Governor of La Rioja Province: Vacant
- Vice Governor of Misiones Province: Julio Piró
- Vice Governor of Nenquen Province: José Lucas Echegaray
- Vice Governor of Rio Negro Province: Pablo Verani
- Vice Governor of Salta Province: Pedro de los Ríos
- Vice Governor of San Juan Province: Wbaldino Acosta
- Vice Governor of San Luis Province: Ángel Rafael Ruiz
- Vice Governor of Santa Cruz:
  - José Ramón Granero (until 6 July)
  - José Ramón Granero (from 6 July)
- Vice Governor of Santa Fe Province: Antonio Vanrell
- Vice Governor of Santiago del Estero: Manuel Hipólito Herrera

== Events ==
=== February ===
- February 15: Diplomatic relations between Argentina–United Kingdom relations are restored, eight years after Argentina's invasion of the Falkland Islands, a British Dependent Territory.

=== July ===
- 8 July – 1990 FIFA World Cup Final (Association football): Argentina lose 1–0 to West Germany in the final of the 1990 FIFA World Cup in Rome, Italy.

=== December ===
- 3 December: Mohamed Alí Seineldín leads the Carapintadas in a second unsuccessful military uprising against the government of President Carlos Menem. The rebellion is swiftly suppressed, reaffirming civilian control over the military. Fourteen people are killed, including five civilians.

== Births ==
=== January ===
- 10 January - Facundo Gambandé, actor and singer
- 19 January - Tatiana Búa, tennis player

== Deaths ==
=== January ===
- 3 January - Mauro Cía, boxer and actor (born 1919)

=== July ===
- 22 July – Manuel Puig, writer (born 1932)

== See also ==
- List of Argentine films of 1990
