= 2001 in Argentina =

- Decades: 1980s; 1990s; 2000s; 2010s; 2020s
- See also: Other events of 2001; List of years in Argentina

Events from the year 2001 in Argentina

== Incumbents ==
- President:
  - until 20 December: Fernando de la Rúa
  - 20 December-22 December: Ramón Puerta
  - 22 December-30 December: Adolfo Rodríguez Saá
  - starting 30 December: Eduardo Camaño
- Vice President: vacant

=== Governors ===
- Governor of Buenos Aires Province: Carlos Ruckauf
- Governor of Catamarca Province: Oscar Castillo
- Governor of Chaco Province: Ángel Rozas
- Governor of Chubut Province: José Luis Lizurume
- Governor of Córdoba: José Manuel De la Sota
- Governor of Corrientes Province:
  - Ramón Mestre (until 20 March)
  - Oscar Aguad (20 March-10 December)
  - Ricardo Colombi (from 10 December)
- Governor of Entre Ríos Province: Sergio Montiel
- Governor of Formosa Province: Gildo Insfrán
- Governor of Jujuy Province: Eduardo Fellner
- Governor of La Pampa Province: Rubén Marín
- Governor of La Rioja Province: Ángel Maza
- Governor of Mendoza Province: Roberto Iglesias
- Governor of Misiones Province: Carlos Rovira
- Governor of Neuquén Province: Jorge Sobisch
- Governor of Río Negro Province: Pablo Verani
- Governor of Salta Province: Juan Carlos Romero
- Governor of San Juan Province: Alfredo Avelín
- Governor of San Luis Province: Adolfo Rodríguez Saá (until 23 December); María Alicia Lemme (starting 23 December)
- Governor of Santa Cruz Province: Néstor Kirchner
- Governor of Santa Fe Province: Carlos Reutemann
- Governor of Santiago del Estero: Carlos Juárez (until 15 December); Carlos Ricardo Díaz (starting 15 December)
- Governor of Tierra del Fuego: Carlos Manfredotti
- Governor of Tucumán: Julio Miranda

=== Vice Governors ===
- Vice Governor of Buenos Aires Province: Felipe Solá
- Vice Governor of Catamarca Province: Hernán Colombo
- Vice Governor of Chaco Province: Roy Nikisch
- Vice Governor of Corrientes Province:
  - Vacant (until 10 December)
  - Eduardo Leonel Galantini (from 10 December)
- Vice Governor of Entre Rios Province: Edelmiro Tomás Pauletti
- Vice Governor of Formosa Province: Floro Bogado
- Vice Governor of Jujuy Province: Rubén Daza
- Vice Governor of La Pampa Province: Heriberto Mediza
- Vice Governor of La Rioja Province: Luis Beder Herrera
- Vice Governor of Misiones Province: Mercedes Margarita Oviedo
- Vice Governor of Nenquen Province: Jorge Sapag
- Vice Governor of Rio Negro Province: Bautista Mendioroz
- Vice Governor of Salta Province: Walter Wayar
- Vice Governor of San Juan Province: Marcelo Lima
- Vice Governor of San Luis Province:
  - María Alicia Lemme (until 10 December)
  - Vacant (from 10 December)
- Vice Governor of Santa Cruz: Vacant
- Vice Governor of Santa Fe Province: Marcelo Muniagurria
- Vice Governor of Santiago del Estero: Vacant
- Vice Governor of Tierra del Fuego: Daniel Gallo

== Events ==
- 4 February: Murder of Natalia Melmann in Miramar.

=== June ===
- 20 June - Boca Juniors defeats Cruz Azul 3-1 on penalties to win the Copa Libertadores. This is Boca Juniors' fourth Copa Libertadores title.

=== December ===
- 16 December: Unemployed activists and protestors demanding food from supermarkets cause several incidents in Greater Buenos Aires.
- 18 December: Supermarkets and convenience stores start being looted in several places of Greater Buenos Aires and Rosario.
- 19 December: President de la Rúa declares a state of emergency. Cacerolazos erupt in major cities. Minister Domingo Cavallo resigns.
- 20 December: Argentine economic crisis: December riots: Riots erupt in Buenos Aires. Violent incidents in Plaza de Mayo between protestors and police, and in other parts of the country. 26 people die. The president resigns. President Fernando de la Rúa resigns two days later.
- 22 December: After Congress deliberations, Adolfo Rodríguez Saá is appointed interim president.
- 30 December: Rodríguez Saá fails to obtain political support from his fellow party members, and resigns after only a week in office.

=== Full date unknown ===
- La cumparsita rock 72 band is formed in Villa Elvira, La Plata.

== Births ==
=== January ===
- January 17 - Enzo Fernández, footballer

=== July ===
- July 18 - Agustina Roth, BMX rider

== Deaths ==
=== January ===
- January 19 - Dario Vittori, Italian-Argentinian actor and producer (b. 1921)

=== March ===
- March 4 - Gerardo Barbero (b. 1961), chess grandmaster

=== October ===
- October 3: Gregorio Peralta (b. 1935), heavyweight boxer

== Sports ==
See worldwide 2001 in sports
