= 1997 in Argentina =

- Decades: 1970s; 1980s; 1990s; 2000s; 2010s
- See also: Other events of 1997; List of years in Argentina

Events from the year 1997 in Argentina

== Incumbents ==
- President: Carlos Menem
- Vice President: Carlos Ruckauf

=== Governors ===
- Governor of Buenos Aires Province: Eduardo Duhalde
- Governor of Catamarca Province: Arnoldo Castillo
- Governor of Chaco Province: Ángel Rozas
- Governor of Chubut Province: Carlos Maestro
- Governor of Córdoba: Ramón Mestre
- Governor of Corrientes Province:
  - Raúl Rolando Romero Feris (until 10 December)
  - Pedro Braillard Poccard (from 10 December)
- Governor of Entre Ríos Province: Jorge Busti
- Governor of Formosa Province: Gildo Insfrán
- Governor of Jujuy Province: Carlos Ferraro
- Governor of La Pampa Province: Rubén Marín
- Governor of La Rioja Province: Ángel Maza
- Governor of Mendoza Province: Arturo Lafalla
- Governor of Misiones Province: Ramón Puerta
- Governor of Neuquén Province: Felipe Sapag
- Governor of Río Negro Province: Pablo Verani
- Governor of Salta Province: Juan Carlos Romero
- Governor of San Juan Province: Jorge Escobar
- Governor of San Luis Province: Adolfo Rodríguez Saá
- Governor of Santa Cruz Province: Néstor Kirchner
- Governor of Santa Fe Province: Jorge Obeid
- Governor of Santiago del Estero: Carlos Juárez
- Governor of Tierra del Fuego:
  - José Arturo Estabillo (until 4 November)
  - Miguel Ángel Castro (4 November-10 December)
  - José Arturo Estabillo (from 10 December)
- Governor of Tucumán: Antonio Domingo Bussi

=== Vice Governors ===
- Vice Governor of Buenos Aires Province: Rafael Romá
- Vice Governor of Catamarca Province: Simón Hernández
- Vice Governor of Chaco Province: Miguel Pibernus
- Vice Governor of Corrientes Province:
  - Lázaro Chiappe (until 10 December)
  - Víctor Hugo Maidana (from 10 December)
- Vice Governor of Entre Rios Province: Héctor Alanis
- Vice Governor of Formosa Province: Floro Bogado
- Vice Governor of Jujuy Province: Vacant
- Vice Governor of La Pampa Province: Manuel Baladrón
- Vice Governor of La Rioja Province: Miguel Ángel Asís
- Vice Governor of Misiones Province: Julio Alberto Ifrán
- Vice Governor of Nenquen Province: Ricardo Corradi
- Vice Governor of Rio Negro Province: Bautista Mendioroz
- Vice Governor of Salta Province: Walter Wayar
- Vice Governor of San Juan Province: Rogelio Rafael Cerdera
- Vice Governor of San Luis Province: Mario Merlo
- Vice Governor of Santa Cruz: Eduardo Arnold
- Vice Governor of Santa Fe Province: Gualberto Venesia
- Vice Governor of Santiago del Estero: Darío Moreno
- Vice Governor of Tierra del Fuego: Miguel Ángel Castro

== Events ==
- 13 April - The 1997 Argentine Grand Prix is held at the Autódromo Oscar Alfredo Gálvez in Buenos Aires, and is won by Jacques Villeneuve.
- 14 September - The 1997 Buenos Aires Grand Prix is held at the Autódromo Oscar Alfredo Gálvez and won by Gabriel Furlán.

=== October ===
- 26 October: The Argentine legislative election is held. The Justicialist Party dominates the elections, by winning 119 seats. The Alliance for Work, Justice and Education, with a larger share of the vote, wins only 110 seats. The results anticipate the end of President Menem's dominance of Argentine politics.
- date unknown - La Voz del Interior, the leading daily newspaper of Córdoba, is acquired by the Clarín Group.

== Births ==
=== March ===
- 21 March - Tini, singer and actress

== Deaths ==
=== January ===
- 29 January - Osvaldo Soriano, journalist and writer (born 1943)

=== June ===
- 18 June - Héctor Yazalde, footballer (born 1946)

=== July ===
- 18 July - Gregorio Weber, scientist (born 1916)

== See also ==
- List of Argentine films of 1997
