= 2000 in Argentina =

- Decades: 1980s; 1990s; 2000s; 2010s; 2020s
- See also: Other events of 2000; List of years in Argentina

The following lists events that happened during 2000 in Argentina.

== Incumbents ==
- President: Fernando de la Rúa
- Vice President:
  - Carlos Álvarez (until October 6)
  - Vacant thereafter

=== Governors ===
- Governor of Buenos Aires Province: Carlos Ruckauf
- Governor of Catamarca Province: Oscar Castillo
- Governor of Chaco Province: Ángel Rozas
- Governor of Chubut Province: José Luis Lizurume
- Governor of Córdoba: José Manuel De la Sota
- Governor of Corrientes Province:
  - Ramón Mestre (until 20 March)
  - Oscar Aguad (20 March-10 December)
  - Ricardo Colombi ((from 10 December)
- Governor of Entre Ríos Province: Sergio Montiel
- Governor of Formosa Province: Gildo Insfrán
- Governor of Jujuy Province: Eduardo Fellner
- Governor of La Pampa Province: Rubén Marín
- Governor of La Rioja Province: Ángel Maza
- Governor of Mendoza Province: Roberto Iglesias
- Governor of Misiones Province: Carlos Rovira
- Governor of Neuquén Province: Jorge Sobisch
- Governor of Río Negro Province: Pablo Verani
- Governor of Salta Province: Juan Carlos Romero
- Governor of San Juan Province: Alfredo Avelín
- Governor of San Luis Province: Adolfo Rodríguez Saá
- Governor of Santa Cruz Province: Néstor Kirchner
- Governor of Santa Fe Province: Carlos Reutemann
- Governor of Santiago del Estero: Carlos Juárez
- Governor of Tierra del Fuego: Carlos Manfredotti
- Governor of Tucumán: Julio Miranda

=== Vice Governors ===
- Vice Governor of Buenos Aires Province: Felipe Solá
- Vice Governor of Catamarca Province: Hernán Colombo
- Vice Governor of Chaco Province: Roy Nikisch
- Vice Governor of Corrientes Province: Vacant
- Vice Governor of Entre Rios Province: Edelmiro Tomás Pauletti
- Vice Governor of Formosa Province: Floro Bogado
- Vice Governor of Jujuy Province: Rubén Daza
- Vice Governor of La Pampa Province: Heriberto Mediza
- Vice Governor of La Rioja Province: Luis Beder Herrera
- Vice Governor of Misiones Province: Mercedes Margarita Oviedo
- Vice Governor of Nenquen Province: Jorge Sapag
- Vice Governor of Rio Negro Province: Bautista Mendioroz
- Vice Governor of Salta Province: Walter Wayar
- Vice Governor of San Juan Province: Marcelo Lima
- Vice Governor of San Luis Province: María Alicia Lemme
- Vice Governor of Santa Cruz: Vacant
- Vice Governor of Santa Fe Province: Marcelo Muniagurria
- Vice Governor of Santiago del Estero: Vacant
- Vice Governor of Tierra del Fuego: Daniel Gallo

== Events ==
=== January ===
- 7 January: For the first time in 35 years, an Argentine expedition team successfully reaches the South Pole.

=== February ===
- 3 February: Murderers of José Luis Cabezas get life imprisonment sentence .

=== March ===
- 8 March: Heavy rains cause floods in Tucumán Province, which then expand to Santiago del Estero and Córdoba .
- 30 March: The government announces salary cuts of 12 to 15% for state employees, following pressures of the IMF.

=== May ===
- 7 May: Aníbal Ibarra is elected Head of Government (mayor) of the Autonomous City of Buenos Aires .

=== June ===
- 7 June: Argentine state-owned company INVAP wins a bid to construct a nuclear reactor for Australia .
- 28 June: The World Bank grants Argentina a $3,000 million loan to fight poverty .
- 30 June: Argentina and Brazil sign an agreement to promote and enhance trade in the automotive industry.

=== October ===
- 6 October: Vice President Carlos "Chacho" Álvarez resigns after denouncing corruption within de la Rúa's administration and in the Senate.

== Deaths ==
=== February ===
- February 12 - Juan Carlos Thorry, actor (b. 1908)

=== July ===
- July 29 - René Favaloro (b. 1923), cardiologist, creator of the coronary artery bypass surgery technique

=== August ===
- August 24 - Rodrigo Bueno (b. 1973), singer and cuartetazo idol.

=== October ===
- October 28 - Carlos Guastavino (b. 1912), composer

=== November ===
- November 10 - Aníbal Verón, bus driver and activist, piquetero icon

=== December ===
- December 12 - Libertad Lamarque (b. 1908), actress

== Sports ==
See worldwide 2000 in sports

- June 21: Boca Juniors wins the Copa Libertadores 2000 after beating Palmeiras in São Paulo on penalties.
- June 26: Huracán wins the 1999/00 second division to return to first division

== See also ==
- List of Argentine films of 2000
