= 1994 in Argentina =

- Decades: 1970s; 1980s; 1990s; 2000s; 2010s
- See also: Other events of 1994; List of years in Argentina

The following are events from the year 1994 in Argentina.

== Incumbents ==
- President: Carlos Menem
- Vice President: Vacant

=== Governors ===
- Governor of Buenos Aires Province: Eduardo Duhalde
- Governor of Santa Cruz Province: Nestor Kirchner
- Governor of Tucumán Province: Palito Ortega

== Events ==
=== April ===
- 10 April: Constitutional Assembly elections are held, with the Justicialist Party winning the most seats, but failing to win a majority.

=== July ===
- 18 July: A suicide bomb-laden van is driven into the Asociación Mutual Israelita Argentina (Argentine Israelite Mutual Association) building in Buenos Aires and subsequently detonated, killing 86 people (including the bomber) and injuring over 300. Ansar Allah, a Hezbollah-allied Palestinian Jihadist group claim responsibility for the attacks. The bombing remains the deadliest terrorist attack in Argentine history.

=== August ===
- 31 August: President Menem abolishes conscription in Argentina as a result of the murder of Omar Carrasco committed in March 1994

== Births ==
=== January ===
- 27 January - Georgina Rodríguez, Argentine-Spanish model

=== May ===
- 6 May - Juan Musso, footballer

=== June ===
- 29 June - Leandro Paredes, footballer

=== July ===
- 11 July - Lucas Ocampos, footballer

=== August ===
- 13 August - Joaquín Correa, footballer

== Deaths ==
=== January ===
- 17 January - Juan Carlos Pugliese, politician (born 1915)

=== February ===
- 17 February - Rosario García Ortega, actress (born 1911)

=== April ===
- 10 April - Reinaldo Gorno, long-distance runner and Olympian (born 1918)

=== May ===
- 6 May - Malvina Pastorino, actress (born 1916)

=== December ===
- 15 December - Oscar Bidegain, politician (born 1905)

== See also ==
- List of Argentine films of 1994
