= 1998 in Argentina =

- Decades: 1970s; 1980s; 1990s; 2000s; 2010s
- See also: Other events of 1998; List of years in Argentina

Events from the year 1998 in Argentina

== Incumbents ==
- President: Carlos Menem
- Vice President: Carlos Ruckauf

=== Governors ===
- Governor of Buenos Aires Province: Eduardo Duhalde
- Governor of Catamarca Province: Arnoldo Castillo
- Governor of Chaco Province: Ángel Rozas
- Governor of Chubut Province: Carlos Maestro
- Governor of Córdoba: Ramón Mestre
- Governor of Corrientes Province: Pedro Braillard Poccard
- Governor of Entre Ríos Province: Jorge Busti
- Governor of Formosa Province: Gildo Insfrán
- Governor of Jujuy Province: Eduardo Fellner
- Governor of La Pampa Province: Rubén Marín
- Governor of La Rioja Province: Ángel Maza
- Governor of Mendoza Province: Arturo Lafalla
- Governor of Misiones Province: Ramón Puerta
- Governor of Neuquén Province: Felipe Sapag
- Governor of Río Negro Province: Pablo Verani
- Governor of Salta Province: Juan Carlos Romero
- Governor of San Juan Province: Jorge Escobar
- Governor of San Luis Province: Adolfo Rodríguez Saá
- Governor of Santa Cruz Province: Néstor Kirchner
- Governor of Santa Fe Province: Jorge Obeid
- Governor of Santiago del Estero: Carlos Juárez
- Governor of Tierra del Fuego: José Arturo Estabillo
- Governor of Tucumán: Antonio Domingo Bussi

=== Vice Governors ===
- Vice Governor of Buenos Aires Province: Rafael Romá
- Vice Governor of Catamarca Province: Simón Hernández
- Vice Governor of Chaco Province: Miguel Pibernus
- Vice Governor of Corrientes Province: Victor Hugo Maidana
- Vice Governor of Entre Rios Province: Héctor Alanis
- Vice Governor of Formosa Province: Floro Bogado
- Vice Governor of Jujuy Province: Vacant
- Vice Governor of La Pampa Province: Manuel Baladrón
- Vice Governor of La Rioja Province: Miguel Ángel Asís
- Vice Governor of Misiones Province: Julio Alberto Ifrán
- Vice Governor of Nenquen Province: Ricardo Corradi
- Vice Governor of Rio Negro Province: Bautista Mendioroz
- Vice Governor of Salta Province: Walter Wayar
- Vice Governor of San Juan Province: Rogelio Rafael Cerdera
- Vice Governor of San Luis Province: Mario Merlo
- Vice Governor of Santa Cruz: Eduardo Arnold
- Vice Governor of Santa Fe Province: Gualberto Venesia
- Vice Governor of Santiago del Estero: Darío Moreno
- Vice Governor of Tierra del Fuego: Miguel Ángel Castro

== Events ==
=== January ===
- 6 January: United States President Bill Clinton officially designates Argentina as a major non-NATO ally.

=== April ===
- 12 April – The 1998 Argentine Grand Prix is held at Autódromo Oscar Alfredo Gálvez in Buenos Aires, and is won by Michael Schumacher.

=== September ===
- 12 September – The Argentina national rugby union team plays the first match in its tour of Japan and Europe.

== Births ==
- 18 January – Lisandro Martínez, footballer

== Deaths ==
=== February ===
- 5 February – Eduardo Francisco Pironio, Roman Catholic cardinal (born 1920).

=== May ===
- 3 May – René Mugica, actor, film director and screenwriter (born 1909)

=== October ===
- 17 October – Antonio Agri, violinist, composer and conductor (born 1932)

== See also ==
- List of Argentine films of 1998
