= 1998–2002 Argentine great depression =

Economic disaster

GDP per capita in Argentina from 1998 to 2005

The 1998–2002 Argentine great depression was an economic depression in Argentina, which began in the third quarter of 1998 and lasted until the second quarter of 2002. It followed fifteen years of stagnation and a brief period of free-market reforms. The depression, which began after the Russian and Brazilian financial crises, caused widespread unemployment, riots, the fall of the government, a default on the country's foreign debt, the rise of alternative currencies and the end of the peso's fixed exchange rate to the US dollar. The economy shrank by 28 per cent from 1998 to 2002. In terms of income, over 50 per cent of Argentines lived below the official poverty line and 25 per cent were indigent (their basic needs were unmet); seven out of ten Argentine children were poor at the depth of the crisis in 2002.

By the first half of 2003, GDP growth had returned, surprising economists and the business media, and the economy grew by an average of 9% for five years. Argentina's GDP exceeded pre-crisis levels by 2005, and Argentine debt restructuring that year resulted in resumed payments on most of its defaulted bonds; a second debt restructuring in 2010 brought the percentage of bonds out of default to 93%, though holdout lawsuits led by vulture funds remained ongoing. Bondholders who participated in the restructuring have been paid punctually and have seen the value of their bonds rise. Argentina repaid its International Monetary Fund loans in full in 2006, but had a long dispute with the 7% of bond-holders left. In April 2016 Argentina came out of the default when the new government decided to repay the country's debt, paying the full amount to the vulture/hedge funds.

== Origins ==
1998–2002 Argentine
great depression
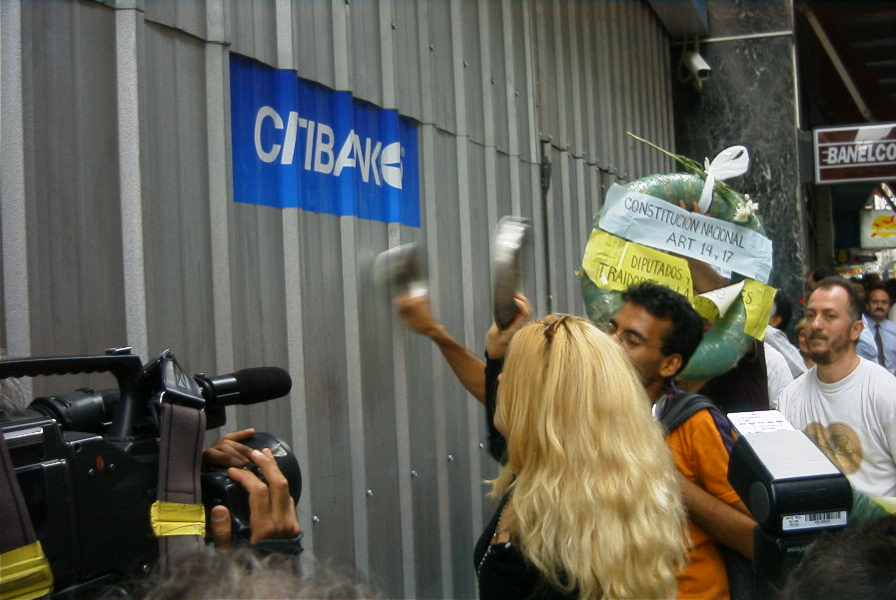

Economy of Argentina
Argentine peso
Convertibility plan
Corralito
Corralón
Cacerolazo
2001 riots
Apagón
Economic emergency law
Debt restructuring

Argentina's many years of military dictatorship (alternating with weak, short-lived democratic governments) had already caused significant economic problems prior to the 2001 crisis, particularly during the self-styled National Reorganization Process in power from 1976 to 1983. A right-wing executive, José Alfredo Martínez de Hoz, was appointed Economy Minister at the outset of the dictatorship, and a neoliberal economic platform centered around anti-labour, monetarist policies of financial liberalization was introduced. Budget deficits jumped to 15% of GDP as the country went into debt for the state takeover of over $15 billion in private debts as well as unfinished projects, higher defense spending, and the Falklands War. By the end of the military government in 1983, the foreign debt had ballooned from $8 billion to $45 billion, interest charges alone exceeded trade surpluses, industrial production had fallen by 20%, real wages had lost 36% of their purchasing power, and unemployment, calculated at 18% (though official figures claimed 5%), was at its highest point since the 1929 Great Depression.

Democracy was restored in 1983 with the election of President Raúl Alfonsín. The new government intended to stabilize the economy and in 1985 introduced austerity measures and a new currency, the Argentine austral, the first of its kind without peso in its name. Fresh loans were required to service the $5 billion in annual interest charges, however, and when commodity prices collapsed in 1986, the state became unable to service this debt.

During the Alfonsin administration, unemployment did not substantially increase, but real wages fell by almost half to the lowest level in fifty years. Prices for state-run utilities, telephone service, and gas increased substantially.

Confidence in the plan, however, collapsed in late 1987, and inflation, which had already averaged 10% per month (220% per year) from 1975 to 1988, spiraled out of control. Inflation reached 200% for the month in July 1989, peaking at 5000% for the year. Amid riots, Alfonsín resigned five months before the end of his term; Carlos Menem took office in July.

== 1990s ==
After a second bout of hyperinflation, Domingo Cavallo was appointed Minister of the Economy in January 1991. On 1 April, he fixed the value of the austral at 10,000 per US dollar. Australs could be freely converted to dollars at banks. The Central Bank of Argentina had to keep its US dollar foreign-exchange reserves at the same level as the cash in circulation. The initial aim of such measures was to ensure the acceptance of domestic currency because after the 1989 and 1990 hyperinflation, Argentines had started to demand payment in US dollars. This regime was later modified by a law (Ley de Convertibilidad) that restored the Argentine peso as the national currency.

The convertibility law reduced inflation sharply, preserving the value of the currency. That raised the quality of life for many citizens, who could again afford to travel abroad, buy imported goods or ask for credit in dollars at traditional interest rates. The fixed exchange rate reduced the cost of imports, which produced a flight of dollars from the country and a massive loss of industrial infrastructure and employment in industry.

Argentina, however, still had external public debt that it needed to roll over. Government spending remained too high, and corruption was rampant. Argentina's public debt grew enormously during the 1990s without showing that it could service the debt. The IMF kept lending money to Argentina and extending its payment schedules.

Reports indicate that tax evasion and money transfers to offshore banks played a role in capital outflows.

A congressional committee started investigations in 2001 over accusations that Central Bank Governor Pedro Pou, a prominent advocate of dollarization, and members of the board of directors had overlooked money laundering within Argentina's financial system. Clearstream was accused of being instrumental in this process.

Other Latin American countries, including Mexico and Brazil (both important trade partners for Argentina) faced economic crises of their own, leading to mistrust of the regional economy. The influx of foreign currency provided by the privatization of state companies had ended. After 1999, Argentine exports were harmed by the devaluation of the Brazilian real against the dollar. A considerable international revaluation of the dollar directly weakened the peso relative to Argentina's trading partners: Brazil (30% of total trade flows) and the eurozone (23% of total trade flows).

After having grown by over 50% from 1990 to 1998, Argentina's GDP declined by 3% in 1999 and the country entered what became a three-year-long recession. President Fernando de la Rúa was elected in 1999 on a reform platform that nevertheless sought to maintain the peso's parity with the dollar. He inherited a country with high unemployment (15%), lingering recession, and continued high levels of borrowing. In 1999, economic stability became economic stagnation (even deflation at times), and the economic measures taken did nothing to avert it. The government continued its predecessor's economic policies. Devaluing the peso by abandoning the exchange peg was considered political suicide and a recipe for economic disaster. By the end of the century, complementary currencies had emerged.

In a 2001 interview, journalist Peter Katel identified three factors that converged "the worst possible time" that made the Argentine economy unravel:

1. The fixed exchange rate between the Argentine peso and the US dollar decided by Cavallo.
2. The large amounts of borrowing by Menem.
3. An increase in debt from reduced tax revenues.

== Currency ==
The 2002 crisis of the Argentine peso, however, shows that even a currency board arrangement cannot be completely safe from a possible collapse. When the peso was first linked to the U.S. dollar at parity in February 1991 under the Convertibility Law, initial economic effects were quite positive: Argentina's chronic inflation was curtailed dramatically and foreign investment began to pour in, leading to an economic boom. Over time, however, the peso appreciated against the majority of currencies as the U.S. dollar became increasingly stronger in the second half of the 1990s. A strong peso hurt exports from Argentina and caused a protracted economic downturn that eventually led to the abandonment of the peso-dollar parity in 2002. This change, in turn, caused severe economic and political distress in the country. The unemployment rate rose above 20 per cent and inflation reached a monthly rate of about 20 per cent in April 2002. In contrast, Hong Kong was able to successfully defend its currency board arrangement during the Asian financial crisis, a major stress test for the arrangement. Although there is no clear consensus on the causes of the Argentine crisis, there are at least three factors that are related to the collapse of the currency board system and ensuing economic crisis:

1. The lack of fiscal discipline
2. Labour market inflexibility
3. Contagion from the financial crises in Russia and Brazil.

While the currency crisis is over, the debt problem has not been completely resolved. The government of Argentina ceased all debt payments in December 2001 in the wake of persistent recession and rising social and political unrest. In 2004, the Argentine government made a 'final' offer amounting to a 75 per cent reduction in the net present value of the debt. Foreign bondholders rejected this offer and asked for an improved offer. In early 2005, bondholders finally agreed to the restructuring, under which they took a cut of about 70 per cent on the value of their bond holdings.

While the provinces of Argentina had always issued complementary currency in the form of bonds and drafts to manage shortages of cash, the scale of such borrowing reached unprecedented levels during this period. They became called "quasi-currencies", the strongest of them being Buenos Aires's Patacón. The national government issued its own quasi-currency, the LECOP. The Crédito also emerged in 1995 as a complementary currency for facilitating barter. Some versions of Crédito were unique for being demurrage currency.

== Rates, riots, resignations and default ==
When a short boom in the early 1990s of portfolio investment from abroad ended in 1995, Argentina became reliant on the IMF to provide the country with low-interest access to credit and to guide its economic reforms. When the recession began in 1999, the national deficit widened to 2.5% of GDP, and its external debt surpassed 50% of GDP. Seeing the levels as excessive, the IMF advised the government to balance its budget by implementing austerity measures to sustain investor confidence. The De la Rúa administration implemented $1.4 billion in cuts in its first weeks in office in late 1999. In June 2000, with unemployment at 14% and projections of 3.5% GDP for the year, austerity was furthered by $938 million in spending cuts and $2 billion in tax increases.

GDP growth projections proved to be overly optimistic (instead of growing, real GDP shrank 0.8%), and lagging tax receipts prompted the government to freeze spending and cut retirement benefits again. In early November, Standard & Poor's placed Argentina on a credit watch, and a treasury bill auction required paying 16% interest (up from 9% in July, the second-highest rate of any country in South America at the time.

Rising bond yields forced the country to turn to major international lenders, such as the IMF, the World Bank, and the US Treasury, which would lend to the government below market rates if it complied with conditions. Several more rounds of belt-tightening followed. José Luis Machinea resigned in March 2001. He was replaced with Ricardo López Murphy, who lasted less than three weeks in office before being replaced with Cavallo.

Standard and Poor's cut the credit rating of the country's bonds to B− in July 2001. Cavallo reacted by offering bondholders a swap: longer-term, higher-interest bonds would be exchanged for bonds due in 2010. The "megaswap" (megacanje), as Cavallo referred to it, was accepted by most bondholders, and it delayed up to $30 billion in payments that would have been due by 2005; but it also added $38 billion in interest payments in the out years; of the $82 billion in bonds that eventually had to be restructured (triggering a wave of holdout lawsuits), 60% were issued during the 2001 megaswap.

Cavallo also attempted to curb the budget crisis by instituting an unpopular across-the-board pay cut in July of up to 13% to all civil servants and an equivalent cut to government pension benefits, De la Rúa's seventh austerity round—triggering nationwide strikes, and from August, it paid salaries of the highest-paid employees in IOUs instead of money. That further depressed the weakened economy, the unemployment rate rose to 16.4% in August 2001 up from a 14.7% a month earlier, and it reached 20% by December.

Public discontent with the economic conditions was expressed in the nationwide election. De la Rúa's alliance lost its majority in both chambers of Congress. Over 20% of voters chose to give blank or defaced ballots rather than indicate support of any candidate.

The crisis intensified when, on 5 December 2001, the IMF refused to release a US$1.3 billion tranche of its loan, citing the failure of the Argentine government to reach its budget deficit targets, and it demanded budget cuts, 10% of the federal budget. On 4 December, Argentine bond yields stood at 34% over U.S. treasury bonds, and, by 11 December, the spread jumped to 42%.

By the end of November 2001, people began withdrawing large sums of dollars from their bank accounts, turning pesos into dollars, and sending them abroad, which caused a bank run. On 2 December, the government enacted measures, informally known as the corralito, which allowed for only minor sums of cash to be withdrawn, initially $250 a week.

=== December 2001 riots and political turmoil ===
The bank withdrawal freeze led to widespread protests, particularly in Buenos Aires. They engaged in protests known as cacerolazo (banging pots and pans). Initially peaceful, these demonstrations later involved damage to property, including banks and foreign-owned companies, particularly those from the United States and Europe.

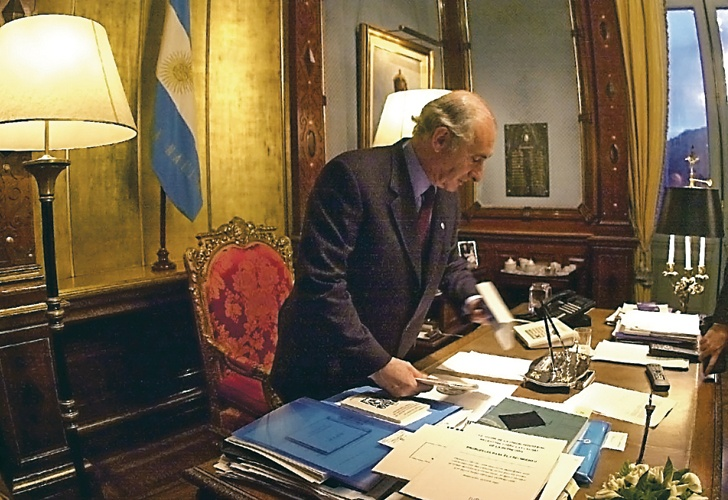
Amid rioting, President Fernando de la Rua resigned on 21 December 2001.

Confrontations between the police and citizens became common, and fires were set on Buenos Aires avenues. De la Rúa declared a state of emergency, but the situation worsened, precipitating the violent protests of 20 and 21 December 2001 in Plaza de Mayo, where clashes between demonstrators and the police ended up with several people dead and precipitated the fall of the government. De la Rúa eventually fled the Casa Rosada in a helicopter on 21 December.

Following the presidential succession procedures established in the Constitution of Argentina, the Senate chairman was next in the line of succession in the absence of the president and the vice-president. Accordingly, Ramón Puerta took office as a caretaker head of state, and the Legislative Assembly (a joint session of both chambers of Congress) was convened.

Adolfo Rodríguez Saá, the governor of San Luis Province, was eventually appointed as the new interim president.

==== Debt default ====
During the last week of 2001, the administration defaulted on the larger part of the public debt, US$132 billion, a seventh of all the money borrowed by the Third World.

Politically, the most heated debate involved the date of the following elections. Proposals ranged from March 2002 to October 2003, the end of De la Rúa's term.

Rodríguez Saá's economic team came up with a scheme designed to preserve the convertibility regime, dubbed the "Third Currency" Plan. It consisted of creating a new, non-convertible currency, the Argentino, that would coexist with convertible pesos and US dollars. It would circulate as cash, or but not in checks, promissory notes, or other instruments, which could be denominated in pesos or dollars. It would be partially guaranteed with federally managed land to counterbalance inflationary tendencies.

Argentines having legal status would be used to redeem all complementary currency already in circulation; their acceptance as a means of payment was quite uneven. It was hoped that convertibility would restore public confidence, and the non-convertible nature of this currency would allow for a measure of fiscal flexibility (unthinkable with pesos) to ameliorate the crippling recession. Critics called the plan merely a "controlled devaluation" but its advocates countered that since controlling a devaluation is perhaps its thorniest issue, that criticism was a praise in disguise. The plan had enthusiastic supporters among mainstream economists (the most well-known being perhaps Martín Redrado, a former Banco Central de la República Argentina president) citing technical arguments. However, it was not implemented because the Rodríguez Saá government lacked the required political support.

Rodriguez Saá lost the support of his own Justicialist Party and resigned before the end of the year. The Legislative Assembly convened again, appointing Peronist Senator Eduardo Duhalde of Buenos Aires Province, who had been the runner-up in the 1999 race for the presidency.

== End of fixed exchange rate ==
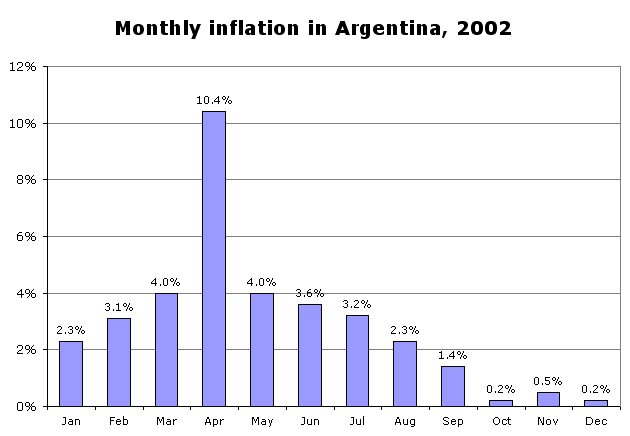
Monthly inflation in Argentina during 2002 (the peak was 10.4%, in April).

In January 2002, after much deliberation, Duhalde abandoned the fixed exchange rate that had been in place for ten years. In a matter of days, the peso lost a large part of its value in the unregulated market. A provisional "official" exchange rate was set at 1.4 pesos per US dollar.

In addition to the corralito, the Ministry of Economy dictated the pesificación; all bank accounts denominated in dollars would be converted to pesos at an official rate. Deposits would be converted at 1.40 ARS per dollar and debt was converted on 1 to 1 basis. The exchange rate spiked as depositors converted their peso deposits back into US dollars. By October 2002, depositors who withdraw lost 50% of their value in dollars. That angered most savings holders and attempts were made to declare it unconstitutional.

After a few months, the exchange rate was mostly a floating exchange rate. The peso further depreciated, which prompted increased inflation. Argentina depended heavily on imports but then could not replace them locally.

Inflation and unemployment worsened during 2002. The exchange rate had reached nearly 4 pesos per dollar, and the accumulated inflation since the devaluation was about 80%, considerably less than predicted by most orthodox economists. The quality of life of the average Argentine was lowered proportionally. Many businesses closed or went bankrupt, many imported products became virtually inaccessible, and salaries were left as they were before the crisis.

Since the supply of pesos did not meet the demand for cash (even after the devaluation), complementary currencies kept circulating alongside them. Fears of hyperinflation as a consequence of devaluation quickly eroded their attractiveness. Their acceptability now ultimately depended on the state's irregular willingness to take them as payment of taxes and other charges.

While the regional currency was frequently accepted at the same value as the peso, Entre Ríos Province's Federal fared among the worst, discounted by an average 30% as even the provincial government that had issued them was reluctant to accept them. There were also frequent rumors that the first state would banish complementary currency overnight, leaving their holders with useless printed paper.

=== Immediate effects ===
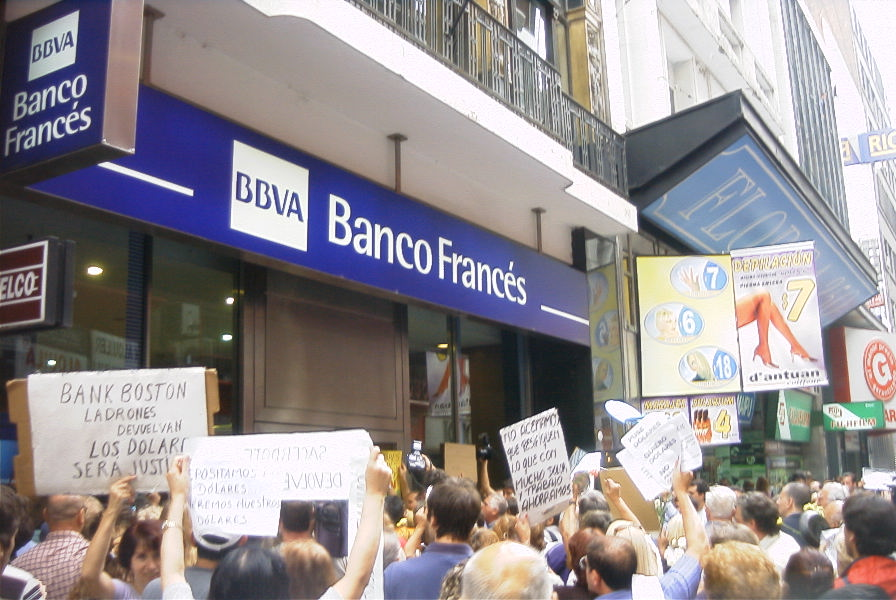
Depositors protest the freezing of their accounts, mostly in dollars. They were converted to pesos at less than half their new value.

Aerolíneas Argentinas was one of the most affected Argentine companies, canceling all international flights for various days in 2002. The airline came close to bankruptcy but survived.

Several thousand homeless and jobless Argentines found work as cartoneros, cardboard collectors. An estimate in 2003 had 30,000 to 40,000 people scavenging the streets for cardboard to sell to recycling plants. Such desperate measures were common because of the unemployment rate, nearly 25%.

Argentine agricultural products were rejected in some international markets for fear that they might have been damaged by the chaos. The US Department of Agriculture put restrictions on Argentine food and drug exports.

== Recovery ==
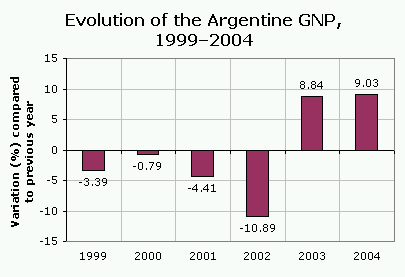
Evolution of the Argentine GNP, 1999–2004.

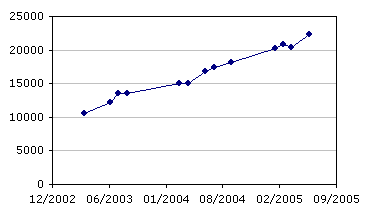
Foreign currency reserves of Argentina's central bank, in millions of US dollars.

Duhalde eventually stabilised the situation somewhat and called for elections. On 25 May 2003, Néstor Kirchner took office as the new president. Kirchner kept Duhalde's Minister of Economy, Roberto Lavagna. Lavagna, a respected economist with centrist views, showed a considerable aptitude at managing the crisis, with the help of heterodox measures.

The economic outlook was completely different from that of the 1990s. The devalued peso made Argentine exports cheap and competitive abroad and discouraged imports. In addition, the high price of soybeans in the international market produced massive amounts of foreign currency; China became a major buyer of Argentina's soy products.

The government encouraged import substitution and accessible credit for businesses, staged an aggressive plan to improve tax collection, and allocated large sums for social welfare but controlled expenditure in other fields.

The peso slowly rose, reaching a 3-to-1 rate to the dollar. Agricultural exports grew and tourism returned. The huge trade surplus ultimately caused such an inflow of dollars that the government was forced to begin intervening to keep the peso from rising further, which would have adversely affected budget balances by limiting export tax revenues and discouraged further reindustrialisation. The central bank started rebuilding its dollar reserves.

By December 2005, foreign currency reserves had reached $28 billion (they were later reduced by the payment of the full debt to the IMF in January 2006). The downside of this reserve accumulation strategy is that US dollars had to be bought with freshly issued pesos, which risked inflation. The Central Bank sterilized its purchases by buying Treasury letters. In this way the exchange rate stabilised to about 3:1.

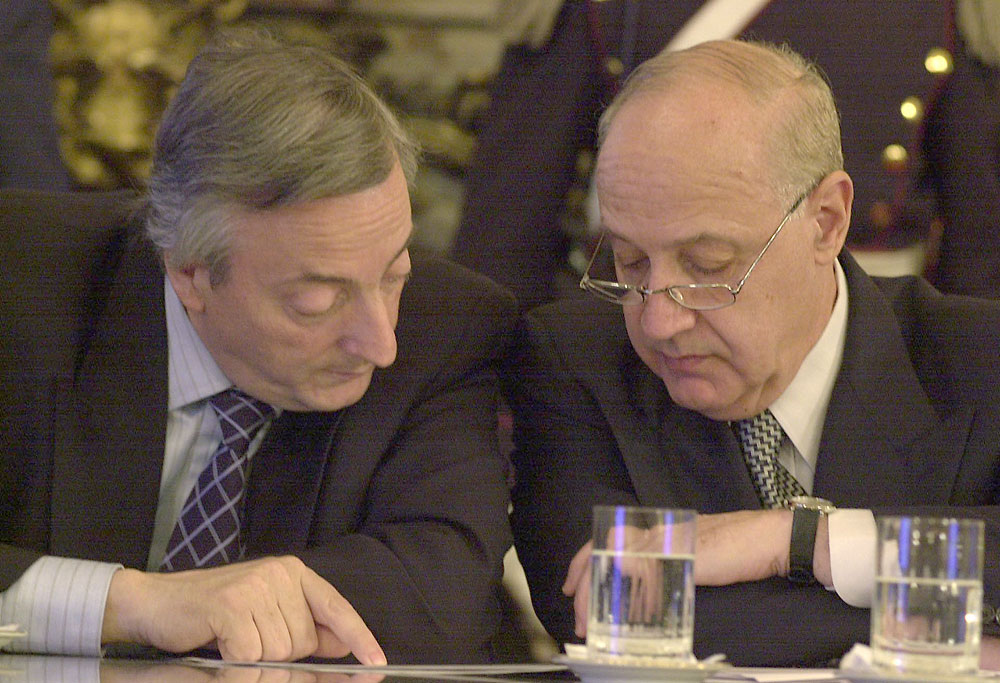
President Kirchner and Economy Minister Lavagna discuss policy, August 2004.

The currency exchange issue was complicated by two opposing factors: a sharp increase in imports since 2004, which raised the demand for dollars, and the return of foreign investment, which brought fresh currency from abroad, after the successful restructuring of about three-quarters of the external debt. The government set up controls and restrictions aimed at keeping short-term speculative investment from destabilising financial markets. The country faced a potential debt crisis in late July 2014, when a New York judge ordered Argentina to pay hedge funds the full interest on bonds it had swapped at a discount rate during 2002. If the judgement proceeded, Argentina argued, the country would become insolvent and have a second debt default.

Argentina's recovery suffered a minor setback in 2004, when rising industrial demand caused a short-lived energy crisis. Argentina continued to grow strongly, however, and GDP jumped 8.8% in 2003, 9.0% in 2004, 9.2% in 2005, 8.5% in 2006 and 8.7% in 2007. Though wages averaged a 17% annual increase from 2002 to 2008, and rising 25% in the year to May 2008, inflation ate away at the increases: 12.5% in 2005; 10% in 2006; nearly 15% in 2007, and over 20% during 2008. The government was accused of manipulating inflation statistics, and The Economist began to turn to private sources instead. The surveying volume prompted the government to increase export tariffs and to pressure retailers into one price freeze after another in a bid to stabilize prices but with little effect.

While unemployment has been considerably reduced (it has hovered around 7% since 2011), Argentina has so far failed to reach an equitable distribution of income. Nevertheless, economic recovery after 2002 was accompanied by significant improvements in income distribution: in 2002, the richest 10% absorbed 40% of all income, compared to 1.1% for the poorest 10% (36 times); but by 2013, the former received 27.6% of income, and the latter, 2% (14 times). That level of inequality compares favorably to levels in most of Latin America and, in recent years, the United States as well.

Living standards recovered significantly after growth resumed in 2003. Even using private inflation estimates, real wages rose by around 72% from their low point, in 2003, to 2013. Argentina's domestic new auto market recovered especially quickly from a low of 83,000 in 2002 (a fifth the levels of the late 1990s) to a record 964,000 in 2013.

== Cooperatives ==
During the economic collapse, many business owners and foreign investors sent their money overseas. As a result, many small and medium enterprises closed for lack of capital. The majority of their workers, faced with a sudden loss of employment and no source of income, decided to reopen the closed facilities on their own as self-managed cooperatives.

Worker cooperatives include the factory Zanon (FaSinPat), the four-star Hotel Bauen, the suit factory Brukman, and the printing press Chilavert. In some cases, former owners sent police to remove workers from the workplaces; that was sometimes successful but in other cases, workers defended occupied workplaces against the state, the police, and the bosses.

A survey by an Buenos Aires newspaper found that around a third of the population had participated in general assemblies. The assemblies used to take place in street corners and public spaces, and they generally discussed ways of helping each other in the face of eviction, or organizing around issues such as health care, collective food buying, or food distribution programs. Some created new structures of health care and schooling. Neighborhood assemblies met once a week in a large assembly to discuss issues that affected the larger community. In 2004, The Take, a documentary, was released on the assemblies.

== Effects on wealth distribution ==
Although GDP grew consistently and quickly after 2003, it did not reach the levels of 1998, the last year before the crisis, until late 2004. Other macroeconomic indicators followed suit. A study by Equis, an independent counseling organization, found out that two measures of economic inequality, the Gini coefficient and the wealth gap between the 10% poorest and the 10% richest among the population, grew continuously from 2001 to March 2005.

Poverty in Argentina
Date of measurement	Extreme poverty	Under poverty line
May 2001	11.6%	35.9%
October 2001	13.6%	38.3%
May 2002	24.8%	53.0%
October 2002	27.5%	57.5%
May 2003	26.3%	54.7%
2nd sem 2003	20.5%	47.8%
1st sem 2004	17.0%	44.3%
2nd sem 2004	15.0%	40.2%
1st sem 2005	13.6%	38.5%
2nd sem 2005	12.2%	33.8%
1st sem 2006	11.2%	31.4%
2nd sem 2006	8.7%	26.4%
2nd sem 2007	5.9%	20.6%
1st sem 2008	5.1%	17.8%
2nd sem 2008	4.4%	15.3%

The adjacent table shows statistics of poverty in Argentina, in per cent of the population. The first column shows the date of the measurement (note that the method and time changed in 2003; poverty is now measured each semester). Extreme poverty is here defined as not having enough money to eat properly. The poverty line is set higher: it is the minimum income needed for basic needs including food, clothing, shelter, and studies.

Similar statistics are available from the World Bank.

== Debt restructuring ==
When the default was declared in 2002, foreign investment stopped, and capital flow ceased almost completely and immediately. The government faced severe challenges in trying to refinance its debt.

The government reached an agreement in 2005 by which 76% of the defaulted bonds were exchanged for other bonds at a nominal value of 25 to 35% of the original and at longer terms. A second debt restructuring in 2010 brought the percentage of bonds out of default to 93%, but some creditors have still not been paid. Foreign currency denominated debt thus fell as a percentage of GDP from 150% in 2003 to 8.3% in 2013.

== Criticism of IMF ==
The IMF accepted no discounts in its part of the Argentine debt. Some payments were refinanced or postponed on agreement. However, IMF authorities at times expressed harsh criticism of the discounts and actively lobbied for the private creditors.

In a speech before the United Nations General Assembly on 21 September 2004, Kirchner said, "An urgent, tough, and structural redesign of the International Monetary Fund is needed, to prevent crises and help in [providing] solutions." Implicitly referencing the fact that the intent of the original Bretton Woods system was to encourage economic development, Kirchner warned that the IMF today must "change that direction, which took it from being a lender for development to a creditor demanding privileges".

During the weekend of 1–2 October 2004, at the annual meeting of the IMF/World Bank, leaders of the IMF, the European Union, the Group of Seven industrialised nations, and the Institute of International Finance (IIF), warned Kirchner that Argentina had to come to an immediate debt-restructuring agreement with creditors, increasing its primary budget surplus to slow debt increases and imposing structural reforms to prove to the world financial community that it deserved loans and investment.

In 2005, after turning its primary surplus into an actual surplus, Argentina began paying the IMF on schedule, with the intention of regaining financial independence. On 15 December 2005, following a similar action by Brazil, Kirchner suddenly announced that Argentina would pay the whole debt to the IMF. The debt payments, totaling US$9.810 billion, were previously scheduled as instalments until 2008. Argentina paid it with the central bank's foreign currency reserves. The payment was made on 6 January 2006.

In a June 2006 report, a group of independent experts hired by the IMF to revise the work of its Independent Evaluation Office (IEO) stated that the assessment of the Argentine case suffered from manipulation and lack of collaboration on the part of the IMF; the IEO is claimed to have unduly softened its conclusions to avoid criticizing the IMF's board of directors.

== Films ==
- Social Genocide (Memoria del Saqueo), by Fernando "Pino" Solanas
- A Lucky Day (Un Día de suerte)
- The Take
- Nine Queens (Nueve Reinas)
- Heroic Losers

== See also ==
- 1998 in Argentina
- 1999 in Argentina
- 2000 in Argentina
- 2001 in Argentina
- 2002 in Argentina
- Piquetero
- Popular assemblies
- South American economic crisis of 2002
- Argentine debt restructuring
