= 1925 in Argentina =

- Decades: 1900s; 1910s; 1920s; 1930s; 1940s
- See also: Other events of 1925; List of years in Argentina

Events from the year 1925 in Argentina

== Incumbents ==
- President: Marcelo Torcuato de Alvear
- Vice President: Elpidio González

=== Governors ===
- Buenos Aires Province: José Luis Cantilo
- Cordoba: Julio A. Roca, Jr. then Ramón J. Cárcano
- Mendoza Province: Enrique Mosca

=== Vice Governors ===
- Buenos Aires Province: Emilio Solanet

== Events ==
- 14 January – Captain Roig and his group of three biplanes Bréguet XIV Renault, land in Buenos Aires on a reconnaissance flight from Rio de Janeiro, to demonstrate the viability of a regular air mail service along the Buenos Aires – Bahía Blanca – Comodoro Rivadavia route.
- date unknown – Dancer La Argentina begins her career performing in Europe.

== Births ==
- 25 May – José María Gatica, boxer (died 1963)
- 20 September – Nelly Moretto, composer (died 1978)
- 17 October – Paco Jamandreu, fashion designer (died 1995)
- 19 October – Emilio Eduardo Massera, military officer (died 2010)
- Unknown date – Mario Passano, film actor and tango performer (died 1995)

== Deaths ==
=== October ===
- 31 October – José Ingenieros, physician and philosopher (born 1877)

== See also ==
- Argentine legislative election, 1924
