= 1991 in Argentina =

- Decades: 1970s; 1980s; 1990s; 2000s; 2010s
- See also: Other events of 1991; List of years in Argentina

Events from the year 1991 in Argentina

== Incumbents ==
- President: Carlos Menem
- Vice President: Eduardo Duhalde

=== Governors ===
- Governor of Buenos Aires Province:
  - Antonio Cafiero (until 10 December)
  - Eduardo Duhalde (from 10 December)

== Events ==
=== March ===
- 26 March: Argentina signs the Treaty of Asunción with Brazil, Uruguay and Paraguay, establishing the South Common Market (Mercosur).

=== April ===
- 1 April: Economic Minister Domingo Cavallo establishes the Argentine peso's 1:1 peg to the U.S. dollar to control inflation.

=== July ===
- 21 July: Argentina defeats Colombia 2–1 to win the 1991 Copa America. This is Argentina's 13th Copa America title and their first since 1959.

=== September ===
- 5 September: Argentina, Brazil and Chile sign the Mendoza Declaration prohibiting the use, development, production, acquisition, stock, or transfer—directly or indirectly—of chemical or biological weapons.

== Births ==
=== June ===
- 7 June – Oliver Benítez, footballer

=== October ===
- 7 October – Brenda Asnicar, actress and singer
- 10 October – Lali Espósito, actress, singer, dancer and model

=== December ===
- 11 December – Gastón Soffritti, actor

== Deaths ==
=== February ===
- 24 February – Héctor Rial, Argentinian footballer (born 1928)

== See also ==
- List of Argentine films of 1991
