= 1996 in Argentina =

- Decades: 1970s; 1980s; 1990s; 2000s; 2010s
- See also: Other events of 1996; List of years in Argentina

The following are events from the year 1996 in Argentina.

== Incumbents ==
- President: Carlos Menem
- Vice President: Carlos Ruckauf

=== Governors ===
- Governor of Buenos Aires Province: Eduardo Duhalde
- Governor of Corrientes Province: Raúl Rolando Romero Feris
- Governor of Entre Ríos Province: Jorge Busti
- Governor of Misiones Province: Ramón Puerta
- Governor of Santa Cruz Province: Nestor Kirchner
- Governor of Tucumán Province: Antonio Domingo Bussi

== Events ==
=== January ===
- 31 January: A federal court in Neuquén sentences four military servicemen to prison terms ranging between 3 and 15 years for the 1994 murder of Omar Carrasco.

=== May ===
- 23 May: The sports newspaper Olé is launched by the Clarín Group in Buenos Aires.
- 30 May: The airline Baires Fly is established.

=== December ===
- 5 December: President Carlos Menem meets with U.S. President Bill Clinton at the White House. During the meeting, President Menem extended an invitation to President Clinton to visit Argentina. President Clinton expressed his intention to visit the region early in his second term.

== Births ==
=== April ===
- 9 April - Giovani Lo Celso, footballer

=== May ===
- 11 May - Andrés Cubas, footballer

=== August ===
- 23 August - Alejo Igoa, YouTuber

=== October ===
- 23 October – Ángeles Rawson, murder victim

== Deaths ==
=== January ===
- 11 January - Tato Bores, comedian (b. 1927)
- 18 January - Leonor Fini, painter (b. 1907)

=== February ===
- 16 February - Roberto Aizenberg, painter and sculptor (b. 1928)

=== March ===
- 18 March - Niní Marshall, comedian (b. 1903)

=== May ===
- 29 May - Isidro B. Maiztegui, composer (b. 1905)

=== December ===
- 11 December - Juan Carlos Barbieri, actor (b. 1932)
- 22 December - Oscar Alende, politician (b. 1909)

== See also ==
- List of Argentine films of 1996
