= 1992 in Argentina =

- Decades: 1970s; 1980s; 1990s; 2000s; 2010s
- See also: Other events of 1992; List of years in Argentina

The following are events from the year 1992 in Argentina.

== Incumbents ==
- President: Carlos Menem
- Vice President: Vacant

=== Governors ===
- Governor of Buenos Aires Province: Eduardo Duhalde
- Governor of Misiones Province: Ramón Puerta
- Governor of Salta Province: Roberto Ulloa
- Governor of Tucumán Province: Palito Ortega

== Events ==
=== February ===
- 14 February: Aerolíneas Argentinas Flight 386 en route from Lima, Peru to Los Angeles, USA, experiences a severe health crisis. Passengers consume in-flight meals contaminated with cholera, leading to 75 reported cases of illness and a fatality.

=== March ===
- 17 March: A suicide bomber attacks the Israeli embassy in Buenos Aires. 29 civilians are killed in the attack and 242 additional civilians are injured. The Islamic Jihad Organization claim responsibility.

=== May ===
- 6 May: A powerful F4 tornado strikes the small village of Estación López in Buenos Aires Province. Ninety percent of the village's structures are destroyed, as vehicles are tossed hundreds of meters, along with four fatalities. It stands as one of the strongest tornadoes recorded in Argentina and the Southern Hemisphere.

=== October ===
- 20 October: Argentina defeats host nation Saudi Arabia 3-1 to win the King Fahd Cup.

=== November ===
- 15 November: A dentist named Ricardo Barreda murders his wife, two daughters, and mother-in-law.

== Sports ==
- Argentina at the 1992 Summer Paralympics
- Argentina at the 1992 Summer Olympics
- 1992 Argentina rugby union tour of Europe
- 1992 Campeonato Argentino de Rugby
- 1992 France rugby union tour of Argentina
- Argentina at the 1992 Winter Olympics

== Births ==
=== March ===
- 9 March - China Suárez, actress and singer

=== June ===
- 21 June - Maximiliano Martínez, footballer

== Deaths ==
=== May ===
- 23 May - Atahualpa Yupanqui, folk musician (born 1908)

=== July ===
- 4 July - Astor Piazzolla, tango composer (born 1921)

== See also ==
- List of Argentine films of 1992
