= 1973 in Argentina =

- Decades: 1950s; 1960s; 1970s; 1980s; 1990s
- See also: Other events of 1973; List of years in Argentina

Events in the year 1973 in Argentina.

== Incumbents ==
- President: Alejandro Agustín Lanusse until May 24, Héctor Cámpora until July 13, Raúl Lastiri until October 11, Juan Peron
- Vice President: Isabel Perón

=== Governors ===
- Buenos Aires Province: Miguel Moragues (until 25 May); Oscar Bidegain (from 25 May)
- Cordoba: Ricardo Obregón Cano (from month unknown)
- Chubut Province: Jorge Costa then Benito Fernández
- Mendoza Province:
  - until 22 March: Félix Gibbs
  - 22 March-25 May: Ramón Genaro Díaz Bessone
  - from 25 May: Alberto Martínez Baca
- Santa Fe Province: Aldo Tessio (until month unknown); Carlos Sylvestre Begnis (from month unknown)

=== Vice Governors ===
- Buenos Aires Province: vacant (until 25 May); Victorio Calabró (starting 25 May)

== Events ==
- January 10 – San Justo tornado
- March 11 – Argentine general election, March 1973: Héctor Cámpora is elected as the new president.
- May 25 – President Héctor Cámpora is inaugurated, in the presence of Chilean President Salvador Allende and Cuban President Osvaldo Dorticós. An estimated million people gather on the Plaza de Mayo to welcome him.
- June 20 – Ezeiza massacre: Former president Juan Perón returns to Argentina. His plane has to be redirected to a military airport because of fighting between armed Peronist factions that have massed to greet his arrival at Buenos Aires's main airport. This event, known as the Ezeiza massacre, left 13 dead and more than 300 injured.
- July 13 – President Héctor Cámpora resigns from office to allow Juan Perón to return to power.
- September 23 – Argentine general election, September 1973: The second general election is held, following the resignation of Vice President Vicente Solano Lima and Senate President Alejandro Díaz Bialet. The runners-up in the March elections — Ricardo Balbín (UCR) and Francisco Manrique (APF) — again accepted their respective parties' nominations, with Manrique obtaining the endorsement of the PDP and naming its leader as his running mate. Juan Perón, with his wife Isabel Perón as his running mate, win with a record landslide on the same FREJULI umbrella ticket on which Cámpora had been elected only six months earlier.
- November 19 – 1973 Boundary Treaty between Uruguay and Argentina

== Births ==
- August 15 – Juan Gil Navarro, actor
- September 8 – Ángel Colla, racing cyclist

== Deaths ==
=== September ===
- September 25 – José Ignacio Rucci, politician and union leader (born 1924; assassinated)

== Films ==
- Andrea Andrea, directed by Carlos Rinaldi
- Argentinísima II, directed by Fernando Ayala and Héctor Olivera
- Los caballeros de la cama redonda, directed by Gerardo Sofovich
- Los Doctores las prefieren desnudas, directed by Gerardo Sofovich
- Furia infernal, directed by Armando Bó

== See also ==
- List of Argentine films of 1973
