= South American economic crisis of 2002 =

The South American economic crisis is the economic disturbances which have developed in 2002 in the South American countries of Argentina, Brazil and Uruguay.

The Argentinian economy was suffering from sustained deficit spending and an extremely high debt overhang, and one of its attempted reforms included fixing its exchange rates to the US dollar. When Brazil, as its largest neighbor and trading partner, devalued its own currency in 1999, the Argentinian peg to the US dollar prevented it from matching any of that devaluation, leaving its tradeable goods to be less competitive with Brazilian exports.

Along with a trade imbalance and balance of payment problem, the need for credit to finance its budget deficits made Argentina's economy vulnerable to economic crisis and instability. In 1999, the economy of Argentina shrank by 3.4%. GDP continued to decline: 0.8% in 2000, 4.4% in 2001, and 10.9% in 2002. One year before, in Brazil, low water level in hydroelectric plants, combined with a lack of long-term investment in energy security, forced the country to do an energy rationing program, which negatively affected the national economy.

== See also ==
- 1998–2002 Argentine great depression
- 2002 Uruguay banking crisis
- 2004 Argentine energy crisis
- Vulture fund
- Latin American debt crisis

== Documentary ==
- Jorge Batlle: entre el cielo y el infierno. A 2024 documentary directed by Federico Lemos.
