= 1993 in Argentina =

- Decades: 1970s; 1980s; 1990s; 2000s; 2010s
- See also: Other events of 1993; List of years in Argentina

The following are events from the year 1993 in Argentina.

== Incumbents ==
- President: Carlos Menem
- Vice President: Vacant

=== Governors ===
- Governor of Buenos Aires Province: Eduardo Duhalde
- Governor of Corrientes Province:
  - Claudia Bello (until 6 February)
  - Ideler Tonelli (From 6 February)
- Governor of Santa Cruz Province: Nestor Kirchner
- Governor of Tucumán Province: Palito Ortega

== Events ==
=== January ===
- 6 January: Douglas Hurd becomes the first high-ranking British official to visit Argentina since the Falklands War.
- 11 January: Three buses collide in a fiery crash in Corrientes, resulting in the deaths of at least 55 people and injuring 70 others.

=== July ===
- 4 July: Argentina defeats Mexico 2-1 to win the 1993 Copa America and their fourteenth Copa America title.

=== October ===
- 3 October: Legislative elections are held, with the Justicialist Party retaining a majority in Congress.

=== December ===
- 30 December: The Argentine Senate passes a measure allowing President Carlos Menem and all future presidents to run for a second consecutive term. It also shortens presidential terms to four years and removes the requirement for the president to be Roman Catholic.

== Deaths ==
=== March ===
- 18 March - Carlos A. Petit, screenwriter (b. 1913)

=== April ===
- 13 April - Isaac Rojas, naval admiral and politician, Vice President (1955–1958) (b. 1906)

=== June ===
- 2 June - Juan José Rodríguez, footballer (b. 1937)

=== July ===
- 18 July - Héctor Freschi, footballer (b. 1911)

=== August ===
- 5 August - Francisco Rúa, footballer (b. 1911)

== See also ==
- List of Argentine films of 1993
