= Timeline of Argentine history =

This is a timeline of Argentine history, comprising important legal and territorial changes and political events in Argentina and its predecessor states. To read about the background to these events, see History of Argentina. See also the list of heads of state of Argentina.

== BC ==
Year	Date	Event
c. 10,000 BC		The earliest traces of humans are dated from the Paleolithic period, and there are further signs in the Mesolithic and Neolithic. However, large areas of the interior were apparently depopulated during an extensive dry period between 4000 and 2000 BC.
500 BC		Irrigation permitted development of sedentary agriculture of staple crops in western and northwestern Andean region

== 1st century ==
Year	Date	Event
1		Several corn-based civilizations developed in the western and northwestern Andean region (Ansilta, Condorhuasi, Cienaga, Aguada, Santa Maria, Huarpes, Diaguitas, Sanavirones, among others)

== 6th century ==
Year	Date	Event
600		Development of metallurgical technologies, permitting elaborate bronzeworks

== 7th century ==
Year	Date	Event
700		Cueva de las Manos was last inhabited, with the final cave dwellers possibly being ancestors of the Tehuelche tribes.

== 9th century ==
Year	Date	Event
850		Emergence of fortified urban settlements

== 15th century ==
Year	Date	Event
1480		The Inca Empire, under the rule of emperor Pachacutec, launched an offensive and conquered present-day northwestern Argentina, integrating it into a region called Qullasuyu

== 16th century ==
Year	Date	Event
1516		Spanish navigator Juan Díaz de Solís first European explorer to visit Río de la Plata, on territory which is now Argentina; Díaz de Solís killed and supposedly cannibalised by native Charrúa, Querandí or Guaraní
1526		Sebastian Cabot sailed up Paraná River and built short-lived fort near modern Rosario
1536		Santa María del Buen Ayre founded by Pedro de Mendoza on site of modern Buenos Aires
1541		Santa María del Buen Ayre settlement abandoned after indigenous attacks
1553		Santiago del Estero founded by Francisco de Aguirre (some claim 1550)
1561		Mendoza founded
1562		San Juan founded
1573		Córdoba and Santa Fe founded
1580		Permanent colony re-established by Spain on the site of Buenos Aires as part of the Viceroyalty of Peru; initial settlement was primarily overland from Peru
1582		Salta founded
1591		La Rioja founded
1593		San Salvador de Jujuy founded

== 17th century ==
Year	Date	Event
1609		First Jesuit missions to the Guaraní founded in the Upper Paraná area. San Ignacio in Misiones
1613		National University of Córdoba founded by Jesuits
1657		Diaguita rebellion led by Spanish rebel, Pedro Bohórquez
1661		San Ignacio school in Córdoba founded by Jesuits
1680		The Portuguese established a trading post across the Rio de la Plata from Buenos Aires
1685		City of Tucumán moved to present location

== 18th century ==
Year	Date	Event
1767		Jesuits expelled from Spanish territories
1776		Establishment of the Viceroyalty of the Río de la Plata (Spanish: Virreinato del Río de la Plata) comprising today's Argentina, Uruguay, and Paraguay, as well as much of present-day Bolivia, declared with Buenos Aires as its capital
1794		Establishment of the Commerce Consulate of Buenos Aires

== 19th century ==
Year	Date	Event
1806		British invasions of the River Plate unsuccessfully attempt to establish control over Spain's southern colonies as part of the Napoleonic Wars. Spanish troops offer no defence but British repelled by local civilians and militias (to 1807)
1810	May	Secret meetings in 1810 organised a petition for an open meeting – Cabildo Abierto
1810	May	The petition was refused by viceroy Baltasar Hidalgo de Cisneros, but popular protest forced his hand on 22 May.
1810	22 May	The Cabildo opened its session with 251 of the city's most prominent citizens, and discussed the future government of the provinces.
1810	23 May	The assembly voted for the removal of the viceroy and the creation of the Primera Junta of locals to govern Buenos Aires, proclaiming loyalty to Ferdinand VII. This was properly agreed and the Junta sworn in on 25 May.
1810		Unsuccessful military campaigns in Paraguay and Alto Perú failed to gather support for joint action by the entire viceroyalty against Spanish forces (to 1811).
1810	May	News of Napoleon's invasion of Spain caused a power vacuum in Buenos Aires leading to a series of events known as the May Revolution.
1810	December	Junta Grande, with delegates from other provinces of the United Provinces of the Río de la Plata, replaced Primera Junta.
1811	September	First Triumvirate of Feliciano Chiclana, Juan José Paso and Manuel de Sarratea replaced Junta Grande.
1812	23 August	The Jujuy Exodus was led by Manuel Belgrano, with several thousand soldiers and civilians retreating from Jujuy and Salta, to avoid military defeat and defections.
1812	8 October	Second Triumvirate of Nicolás Rodriguez Peña, Antonio Álvarez Jonte and Juan José Paso replaced First Triumvirate.
1813	31 January	The Assembly of the Year XIII called in February to plan further military campaigns and organise defence of Buenos Aires
1813	3 February	The Battle of San Lorenzo, the first battle of José de San Martín in the Argentine War of Independence.
1814	31 January	Second Triumvirate replaced by position of Supreme Director, first occupied by Gervasio Antonio de Posadas
1814	14–17 May	Battle of Buceo saw United Provinces' fleet defeat Spanish navy securing coast.
1815		Defeats in battles in late 1815 led to final loss of modern Bolivia
1816	March	An assembly of provincial delegates met as the Congress of Tucumán to discuss future military and political developments
1816	9 July	The Congress declared the independence of Argentina
1820		The Battle of Cepeda took place between Unitarians who supported a strong centralised state, and Federals, largely provincial caudillo warlords who wanted decentralised authority. The Federals won and the February 1820 Treaty of Pilar declared Argentina as a federal country, although Unitarian ideals continued
1825		The United Kingdom recognises Argentine independence.
1825		Deputies from the eastern bank of the Río de la Plata declare independence from Brazil, leading to the Cisplatine War. The 1827 Battle of Ituzaingó saw tactical success for Argentina. The war ended in 1828 with a treaty giving independence to Uruguay
1828		Luis Vernet establishes settlement on the Falkland Islands
1829	6 December	Juan Manuel de Rosas became governor of Buenos Aires Province
1830		Yaghan aboriginal Jemmy Button (Orundellico) taken from Tierra del Fuego to England by Robert FitzRoy on HMS Beagle
1831	4 January	Pacto Federal signed between provinces to protect federal nature of country
1831		The Voyage of the Beagle with Charles Darwin and Robert FitzRoy visited the Río de la Plata, Patagonia and Tierra del Fuego (to 1834)
1831		Argentine Governor of the Falkland Islands Luis Vernet is expelled by USS Lexington following his seizure of United States interests. New governor murdered in 1832 mutiny
1833		Juan Manuel de Rosas begins the First Conquest of the Desert
1833	2 January	British forces re-occupy the Falkland Islands
1839		Rosas made Supreme Chief of the Argentine Confederation
1852		Rosas overthrown by Justo José de Urquiza following Battle of Caseros
1853	1 May	Constitution of Argentina agreed by assembly in Santa Fe, creating modern system of government
1854		Urquiza became first President of Argentina in modern sense but opposed by Buenos Aires, still opposed to federal project
1859		Defeat of Unitarian forces led by Bartolomé Mitre by Urquiza and federals at Battle of Cepeda; Buenos Aires re-enters confederation
1861	20 March	Mendoza earthquake kills 6,000 to 12,000 citizens of Mendoza.
1864	13 November	Start of Paraguayan War between Paraguay and the Triple Alliance of Argentina, Brazil and Uruguay, leading to utter defeat of Paraguay by 1870
1878		Commencement of the Conquest of the Desert against indigenous inhabitants of the south led by Julio Argentino Roca; final surrender by 1884
1880		Roca became president, finally defeated federals and moved capital to Buenos Aires from Rosario
1884	September	Gold is discovered near Cape Virgenes sparking the Tierra del Fuego gold rush
1890	26 June	Founding of the Radical Civic Union (UCR) or Radical Party
1890		The Panic of 1890 brought the Baring Brothers bank in London close to collapse after disastrous investments in Argentina
1895		Mandatory military service (Conscription) established

== 20th century ==
Year	Date	Event
1902		The Drago Doctrine is announced by the Argentine Minister of Foreign Affairs Luis María Drago.
1912	February	Sáenz Peña Law introduces universal, secret and compulsory male suffrage, end of the Generation of '80
1916	12 October	Start of presidency of Hipólito Yrigoyen, UCR democratic reformist
1918		Students strikes and demonstrations enforce the university reform of shared powers between teachers, graduates and students
1927	10 October	Fabrica Militar de Aviones aircraft factory founded in Cordoba
1930		Military coup deposed Yrigoyen, starting the 'Infamous Decade'
1931		General Agustín Pedro Justo declared winner of Presidency following 'patriotic fraud' in election
1943		'National Revolution' led by nationalist military officers including Colonel Juan Perón; ensured continued non-intervention in World War II
1944	15 January	San Juan earthquake destroys provincial capital, kills 10,000.
1945		Argentina enters World War II on the side of the Allies and admitted as founding member of United Nations
1945		Perón arrested then freed after major popular protest by those known as the Descamisados
1946	15 May	Indigenous people march in Malón de la Paz to Buenos Aires to demand land rights
1946	4 June	Perón elected president; re-elected to presidency in 1951
1947		Women's suffrage is approved
1950	31 May	The National Atomic Energy Commission (Comisión Nacional de Energía Atómica, CNEA) is founded
1950	27 June	First flight of the FMA IAe 33 Pulqui II, the first jet fighter to be entirely developed and built in Latin America.
1952	26 July	Death of Eva Perón
1955	September	Perón ousted in 'Liberating Revolution' military coup
1956	4 December	INTA (National Agricultural Technology Institute), is created
1957	27 December	INTI (National Institute of Industrial Technology), is created
1958		ARA Independencia, the first aircraft carrier of the Argentine Navy, enters service
1962	29 March	Military coup ended presidency of civilian Arturo Frondizi
1966		General Juan Carlos Onganía assumed power and represses political parties
1967	9 October	Death of Ernesto 'Che' Guevara
1969	May	In the Cordobazo protests, thousands of citizens routed the army and police and took control of Córdoba for two days
1969	20 August	A counterinsurgency aircraft, the FMA IA 58 Pucará, flies for the first time
1969		Aircraft carrier ARA Veinticinco de Mayo replaces ARA Independencia
1970		General Alejandro Agustín Lanusse emerged as president after Onganía toppled
1970		Civil conflict and terrorist attacks, principally by left-wing Montoneros and Ejército Revolucionario del Pueblo opposed by paramilitary Argentine Anticommunist Alliance (to 1976)
1973	20 June	The Ezeiza massacre takes place upon Perón's return from exile, when members of the Triple A open fire on the crowd awaiting him.
1973		Democratic elections brought Peronist Héctor José Cámpora to power; Perón elected president in fresh elections later that year
1974		Atucha Nuclear Power Plant, the first nuclear power plant in Latin America, began operation
1974		Death of Juan Perón, leaving widow Isabel Perón as president
1976	24 March	A military coup deposed Isabel Perón
1976	24 March	The Proceso de Reorganización Nacional military government led by Jorge Videla repressed political and armed opposition through use of torture, forced disappearance and extrajudicial killing up of to 30,000 people (to 1983)
1976	1 September	The high tech company INVAP is created.
1978	June	Argentina hosted and won the 1978 FIFA World Cup
1978		Argentina refused the binding Beagle Channel arbitration and started the Operation Soberanía in order to invade Chile
1982	April	Leader General Leopoldo Galtieri sent troops to the Falkland Islands triggering Falklands War; British task force retook islands by mid-June
1983	10 December	Military government collapsed; election of Radical Raúl Alfonsín as president
1984	20 January	Embalse Nuclear Power Station began operations
1984	6 October	The trainer aircraft FMA IA-63 Pampa flight for the first time.
1984	29 November	The Treaty of Peace and Friendship of 1984 between Chile and Argentina ends border dispute over Picton, Nueva and Lennox islands
1985		La Historia Oficial film won the Academy Award for Best Foreign Language Film
1986		Argentina wins 1986 FIFA World Cup, captained by Diego Maradona
1987	April	First uprising by Carapintadas, commanded by Colonel Aldo Rico, two arrested. Alfonsín declares La casa está en orden (The house is in order)
1988	January	Second Carapintada revolt, again under Rico's command in January, 300 arrested
1988		Third and last Carapintada uprising, led by Mohamed Alí Seineldín, two arrested
1989		Dissident military group attacks La Tablada regiment, but are finally seized
1989		Hyper-inflation and political turmoil brings Peronist Carlos Menem to power in election
1990		Neo-liberal economic policies and privatisations brought general strikes, hunger strikes and political party realignments
1991		Argentine peso pegged to United States dollar
1991		Argentina is the only Latin American country to participate in the first Gulf War under mandate of the United Nations
1991		Mercosur customs union founded by the Treaty of Asunción
1991		Argentina, Brazil and Chile signed the Mendoza Declaration prohibiting Chemical Weapons
1992		Israeli Embassy attack in Buenos Aires killed 29 in terrorist attack
1993		Argentina joins UNFICYP mission at Cyprus. As of 2006, ground troops and helicopters are serving there and since 1999 have other Latin American countries troops embedded.
1994		Following the Pact of Olivos, the constitution reform is agreed, allowing Presidents to serve second consecutive term
1994		Bombing of AMIA Jewish Community Centre in Buenos Aires, killing 85
1994		The murder of Omar Carrasco, a 20-year-old conscript, leads President Menem to abolishing conscription
1995		Menem won second term
1995		Argentina acceded to the Nuclear Non-Proliferation Treaty
1995		FMA privatized into Lockheed Martin Aircraft Argentina
1996		Radical Fernando de la Rúa elected first Mayor of Buenos Aires
1997		Radicals, left-wing FrePaSo and others joined forces as Alianza electoral alliance to oppose Menem and Peronists
1997		The A-4AR Fightinghawk enter service in the Argentine Air Force
1998		U.S. President Bill Clinton designated Argentina as a major non-NATO ally
1999		De la Rúa won Presidency as head of the Alianza, but was confronted by growing economic crisis
1999		In one of the worst accidents in the history of Argentinian aviation, LAPA Flight 3142 crash at Aeroparque Jorge Newbery airport resulted in 65 fatalities.
2000		High tech company INVAP is chosen by Australia to design and construct the OPAL nuclear reactor
2000		Vice-President Carlos Álvarez resigned in protest political bribes scandal, precipitating crisis in ruling alliance

== 21st century ==
Year	Date	Event
2001		In March, the remaining FrePaSo ministers resigned from government in protest at economic and labour reforms
2001	November	The government responded to a run on banks by limiting access to bank deposits in the corralito
2001	December	Events that have become known as the Argentinazo took place: Middle classes, exasperated with constraints of corralito, took to streets in protest in the Cacerolazo; Trade unions and piqueteros began protests, and shops and businesses were ransacked; Violent protests and mass demonstrations in the Plaza de Mayo; 26 die in protests nationwide; Finance minister Domingo Cavallo and President de la Rúa resigned in quick succession on 19 and 20 December; Provincial governor Adolfo Rodríguez Saá appointed president by Argentine Congress on 22 December; Rodríguez Saá declared a short-lived debt moratorium. After a few days, Argentina officially defaulted on $93 billion of its debt to the International Monetary Fund and creditors; Rodríguez Saá resigned after a week following lack of support from colleagues; Eduardo Duhalde, losing candidate in the 1999 presidential elections, appointed president with broad cross-party support
2002		Duhalde imposes further financial measures, including converting dollar accounts to pesos, scrapping 1:1 parity with the dollar, and social measures to bring economy under control
2003		Former President Carlos Menem wins first round of presidential election but pulls out facing certain defeat, handing victory to fellow Peronist Néstor Kirchner
2004	April	More than 100,000 people demonstrated in Buenos Aires in support of Juan Carlos Blumberg, father of murdered student Axel Blumberg, demanding harsher criminal laws.
2004		Kirchner pursued Argentine debt restructuring
2004		Natural gas supply shortage produced tension with Chile
2004	1 September	Secretariat of the Antarctic Treaty established in Buenos Aires
2004	30 December	A fire in the República Cromagnon nightclub in Buenos Aires kills 194 people and injures over 1,000.
2005	February	Relations between Catholic Church and government broke down between military chaplain and minister over abortion
2005		Supreme Court overruled 'Laws of Pardon' that were used to pardon military figures of the Dirty War
2005		First disputes of the Cellulose plant conflict between Argentina and Uruguay
2005	October	Mid-term elections saw a massive split in the Justicialist Party between Kirchner's centre-left Front for Victory faction and the rump of his former patron Duhalde and other provincial leaders; Front for Victory wins by large margin
2005		Massive demonstrations against U.S. President George W. Bush at the 4th Summit of the Americas in Mar del Plata
2005	December	Kirchner announced cancellation of IMF debt with single, final payment
2006	March	Buenos Aires mayor Aníbal Ibarra removed from office following accusations of negligence regarding the República Cromagnon nightclub fire of 2004
2007	9 October	Catholic priest Christian von Wernich is found guilty of involvement in seven murders and 42 cases of kidnapping and torture related to the state-sponsored Dirty War. Von Wernich is sentenced to life imprisonment.
2007	10 December	Cristina Kirchner assumes as new president of Argentina.
2010	22 July	Same-sex marriage has been legal in Argentina
2020	December	The abortion law was liberalized when the Voluntary Interruption of Pregnancy Bill was passed by the National Congress.

== See also ==
- Timeline of Buenos Aires history
