= Energía Argentina =

Argentine energy company

Energía Argentina S.A.
- Type: Public
- Industry: Energy
- Founded: 2004; 22 years ago
- Founder: Néstor Kirchner
- Headquarters: Buenos Aires, Argentina
- Key people: Andrés Cirnigliaro (president)
- Products: Oil refinery; Natural gas; Electricity
- Services: Hydrocarbon exploration; Pipeline transport; Electricity generation
- Revenue: ▲US$600 million (1997)
- Net income: ▲US$310 million (1997)
- Owner: Government of Argentina
- Website: energia-argentina.com.ar

Energía Argentina Sociedad Anónima, mostly known for its acronym ENARSA, is a state owned company in Argentina. It is engaged in the exploitation of petroleum and natural gas, and the production, industrialization, transport and trade of these and of electricity.

== History ==
Enarsa was founded on December 29, 2004, by an initiative of President Néstor Kirchner. The initiative had the political goal of reinserting the state in an oligopolistic market that was completely privatized during the Menem administration in the 1990s; these privatizations included the state oil firm YPF to the Spanish corporation Repsol, as well as its sister company, Gas del Estado, to eleven mainly foreign-owned firms.

The creation of Enarsa was a response to the energy crisis endured by Argentina in 2004, caused in part by lack of investment by private fossil fuel companies in infrastructure needed to meet the demand of natural gas. The price of natural gas, key to energy generation and transportation in Argentina, was frozen since 2002, while gasoline and diesel had increased their price sharply following the devaluation of the peso at the peak of the Argentine economic crisis.

In 2017, Enarsa was merged with Emprendimientos Energéticos Binacionales S.A. (EBISA) and was called Integración Energética Argentina S.A. (Ieasa), until 2022, when the company returned to its original name Enarsa.

== Operations ==
Enarsa's main asset is the ownership of all rights of supervision and concessions of exploitation of offshore energy resources (i. e. all kinds of fossil fuels that are or may be found in the maritime platform). The Argentine national state owns 53% of the company; another 12% is shared by provincial governments, and the remaining 35% is traded in the stock market. Specialized in energy distribution, Enarsa remained a minor oil producer in Argentina, however, with 0.12% of the total; the firm required US$1.5 billion in subsidies in 2011. In April 2025, Enarsa was 100% state-owned, with the Argentinian national government holding 97.95%, the provincial government with 2.04% and state-owned Nucleoeléctrica Argentina with 0.01%.

On 18 September 2024, the 19 year long natural gas import agreement between Enarsa and Bolivia ended with the reversal of the Northern Gas pipeline. Enarsa imported gas from Chile until the reversal of the pipeline occurred in October 2024.

In May 2026, Argentina awarded Enarsa’s 50% stake in Compañía Inversora en Transmisión Eléctrica (Citelec) to a consortium of Edison Transmisión and Genneia for $356.1 million.

The company's goals includes four principal areas of operations:

- exploration and development of oil and gas reserves and the production of oil and gas;
- marketing and transportation of oil, gas and oil products;
- gathering, treatment, processing and distribution of gas and power generation;
- drilling and well services.

== Prospects ==
The president of the company board, Exequiel Espinoza, announced in April 2005 that Enarsa will participate in joint offshore exploration activities with several other state-owned oil companies in the region, including Venezuelan PDVSA, Uruguayan ANCAP, Paraguayan Petropar and Chilean ENAP, as well as possibly Petroecuador. Espinoza also mentioned contacts with Chinese and Russian companies.

Jorge Haiek, a member of Enarsa's board of directors, asserted that Argentina should cease to export oil in order to preserve a strategic reserve for the near future, and attempt to substitute natural gas for liquid fuel whenever possible, until alternative sources can be developed. Argentina already has more natural gas vehicles than any other country in the world. Enarsa will most probably find and exploit natural gas in much larger amounts than petroleum, and emphasis on finding gas should also be applied to onshore exploitation, since shortage of gas was the cause of the 2004 energy crisis, and domestic demand has doubled in 12 years.

Argentine Minister of Federal Planning Julio de Vido stated that the government is working to create a supranational energy company which would include Venezuela, Bolivia and Argentina; PDVSA participates in Enarsa with investment and technical consultation. Enarsa later entered into a number of joint ventures with state-owned PdVSA of Venezuela, yielding a discovery in 2008 of an oil field in the Orinoco River basin of up to 3 billion barrels. The 40% share of the resulting revenues to which Enarsa would be entitled had the potential of rivaling those of YPF, thereby returning the public sector to a prominent role in the Argentine energy sector.
