= 1859 in Argentina =

- Decades: 1830s; 1840s; 1850s; 1860s; 1870s
- See also: Other events of 1859; List of years in Argentina

Events in the year 1859 in Argentina.

== Incumbents ==
- President: Justo Jose de Urquiza

=== Governors ===
- Buenos Aires Province: Valentín Alsina (until 8 November), Felipe Llavallol (starting 8 November)
- Governor of Cordoba: Mariano Fragueiro
- Mendoza Province:
  - until 25 March: Juan Cornelio Moyano
  - 25 March-16 April: Federico Maza
  - 16 April-23 August: Pascual Echagüe
  - starting 23 August: Laureano Nazar

== Events ==
- October 23 – Battle of Cepeda (1859)
