= 1852 in Argentina =

- Decades: 1830s; 1840s; 1850s; 1860s; 1870s
- See also: Other events of 1852; List of years in Argentina

Events in the year 1852 in Argentina.

== Incumbents ==
- Governor of Buenos Aires Province: Juan Manuel de Rosas (de facto Head of State of Argentina
- Governor of Cordoba: Manuel López then Alejo Carmen Guzmán
- Governor of Santa Fe Province: Domingo Crespo
- Provisional Director of the Argentine Confederation: Justo José de Urquiza

== Events ==
- January 29 – Platine War: Battle of Alvarez Field. 4,000 Rosas loyalist Argentine troops led two of General Ángel Pacheco's colonel defeated by anti-Rosas forces.
- January 31 – Two anti-Rosas divisions defeat Pacheco's forces at the Battle of Marques Bridge
- February 1 – anti-Rosas coalition camps 9 km (5.6 mi) from Buenos Aires
- February 2 – brief skirmish between anti-Rosas coalition and Rosas loyalists end with loyalists retreat
- February 3 – Platine War: Battle of Caseros. Rosas overthrown and exiled from Argentina
- February 4 – surviving soldiers of Regimento Aquino, composed of Rosas loyalists who had defected from anti-Rosas coalition, summarily executed by firing squad
- February 20 – Brazilian forces, part of victorious anti-Rosas coalition, parade through Buenos Aires to mark 25th anniversary of Battle of Ituzaingó in Cisplatine War
- May 31 – San Nicolás Agreement
- September 11 – coup d'etat in Argentina; Buenos Aires Province declares independence.
- Yellow fever in Buenos Aires epidemic

== Deaths ==
- February 4 – Martiniano Chilavert, former Unitarian turned Rosas loyalist, executed by firing squad
