= 1924 in Argentina =

- Decades: 1900s; 1910s; 1920s; 1930s; 1940s
- See also: Other events of 1924; List of years in Argentina

Events from the year 1924 in Argentina

== Incumbents ==
- President: Marcelo Torcuato de Alvear
- Vice President: Elpidio González

=== Governors ===
- Buenos Aires Province: José Luis Cantilo
- Cordoba: Julio A. Roca, Jr.
- Mendoza Province: Carlos Washington Lencinas (until 9 October); Enrique Mosca (from 9 October)

=== Vice Governors ===
- Buenos Aires Province: Pedro Solanet

== Events ==
- March 7 – 1924 Argentine legislative election
- July 19 – Napalpí massacre

== Births ==
- April 24 – Nahuel Moreno, Trotskyist leader (died 1987)
- June 11 – Jovita Luna, singer and actress (died 2006)
- June 21 – Ricardo Infante, footballer and manager (died 2008)
- August 22 – Orlando Ramón Agosti, Argentine general (died 1997)
- August 29 – María Dolores Pradera, singer and actress (died 2008)
- November 21 – Víctor Hipólito Martínez, lawyer and politician (died 2017)

== Deaths ==
- December 6 – Aurelia Vélez Sársfield, writer (born 1836)
- date unknown – Juan Argerich, writer (born 1862)

== See also ==
- List of Argentine films of 1924
