= 1914 in Argentina =

- Decades: 1890s; 1900s; 1910s; 1920s; 1930s
- See also: Other events of 1914; List of years in Argentina

Events from the year 1914 in Argentina.

== Incumbents ==
- President: Roque Sáenz Peña and Victorino de la Plaza
- Vice president: Victorino de la Plaza

=== Governors ===
- Buenos Aires Province: Luis García (until 1 May); Marcelino Ugarte (from 1 May)
- Cordoba: Ramón J. Cárcano
- Mendoza Province: Rufino Ortega Ozamis (until 6 March); Francisco S. Álvarez (from 6 March)

=== Vice Governors ===
- Buenos Aires Province: vacant (until 1 May); Vicente Peralta Alvear (starting 1 May)

== Events ==
- March 22 – Argentine legislative election, 1914

== Births ==
- May 15 – Oscar Casanovas, boxer (died 1987)
- September 15 – Adolfo Bioy Casares, writer, journalist, and translator
- November 12 – Roberto Cavanagh, polo player (died 2002)

== Deaths ==
- August 9 – Roque Sáenz Peña, president (b. 1851)
