= List of Argentine films of 1997 =

A list of films produced in Argentina in 1997:

Argentine films of 1997
Title	Director	Release	Genre
A - D
24 horas	Luis Barone	18 September	
Bajo bandera	Juan José Jusid	21 August	
Buenos Aires Vice Versa	Alejandro Agresti	18 September	
Canción desesperada	Jorge Coscia	13 November	
Cenizas del paraíso	Marcelo Piñeyro	7 August	
El Che	Aníbal Di Salvo	2 May	
Comodines	Jorge Nisco	19 June	
Dibu	Carlos Olivieri and Alejandro Stoessel	10 July	
Dile a Laura que la quiero	José Miguel Juárez	7 February	
E - N
Fantasmas en la Patagonia	Claudio Remedi	6 March	
La furia	Juan Bautista Stagnaro	5 June	
Graciadió	Raúl Perrone	22 August	
Hasta la victoria siempre	Juan Carlos Desanzo	9 October	
Historias clandestinas en La Habana	Diego Musiak	8 May	
El impostor	Alejandro Maci	22 May	
La lección de tango	Sally Potter	20 November	
Martín (hache)	Adolfo Aristarain	17 April	
Noche de ronda	Marcos Carnevale	13 November	
O - Z
Pequeños milagros	Eliseo Subiela	4 September	
Plaga Zombie ¡La venganza alienígena ha comenzado!	Pablo Parés and Hernán Sáez	noviembre	
Prohibido	Andrés Di Tella	2 May	
Quereme así (Piantao)	Rodolfo Pagliere	4 December	
Sapucay, mi pueblo	Fernando Siro	2 October	
El sekuestro	Eduardo Montes Bradley	24 April	
El sueño de los héroes	Sergio Renán	6 November	
Territorio comanche	Gerardo Herrero	29 May	
Un asunto privado	Imanol Arias	17 April	
La vida según Muriel	Eduardo Milewicz	28 August	

== See also ==
- 1997 in Argentina

== External links and references ==
- Argentine films of 1997 at the Internet Movie Database
