= 1851 in Argentina =

- Decades: 1830s; 1840s; 1850s; 1860s; 1870s
- See also: Other events of 1851; List of years in Argentina

Events in the year 1851 in Argentina.

== Incumbents ==
- Governor of Buenos Aires Province: Juan Manuel de Rosas (de facto Head of State of Argentina)
- Governor of Cordoba: Manuel López
- Governor of Santa Fe Province: Pascual Echagüe then Domingo Crespo

== Events ==
- May 1 – governors Justo José de Urquiza of Entre Rios and Benjamin Virasoro of Corrientes rise up against Rosas
- May 29 – Corrientes and Entre Rios enter into alliance with Uruguay and Empire of Brazil
- August 18 – Rosas declares war on Empire of Brazil

== Births ==
- March 19 – Roque Sáenz Peña, President 1910–1914 (d. 1914)
