= 1827 in Argentina =

- Decades: 1800s; 1810s; 1820s; 1830s; 1840s
- See also: Other events of 1827; List of years in Argentina

Events in the year 1827 in Argentina.

== Events ==
- February 20 – Cisplatine War: Battle of Ituzaingó
- April 7–8 – Battle of Monte Santiago

== Deaths ==
- February 20 – Federico de Brandsen, French-born military officer and veteran of Argentine War of Independence, killed in action
