= List of Argentine films of 1999 =

A list of films produced in Argentina in 1999:

Argentine films of 1999
Title	Director	Release	Genre
A - E
1977, casa tomada	María Pilotti	25 February	
Alma mía	Daniel Barone	13 May	
El amateur	Juan Bautista Stagnaro	22 April	
América mía	Gerardo Herrero	24 June	
Caminos del Chaco	Alejandro Fernández Mouján	11 March	
La cara del ángel	Pablo Torre	24 June	
Che, un hombre de este mundo	Marcelo Schapces	11 November	
Comisario Ferro	Juan Rad	25 February	
Diablo, familia y propiedad	Fernando Krichmar	7 October	
La edad del sol	Ariel Piluso	1 July	
El mismo amor, la misma lluvia	Juan José Campanella	16 September	
Esa maldita costilla	Juan José Jusid	12 August	
El evangelio de las maravillas	Arturo Ripstein	13 May	
F - N
Garaje Olimpo	Marco Bechis	2 September	drama
Héroes y demonios	Horacio Maldonado	2 September	
H. G. O.	Víctor Bailo and Daniel Stefanello	15 April	Documentary
Invierno, mala vida	Gregorio Cramer	26 August	
Lisboa	Antonio Hernández	29 April	
Manuelita	Manuel García Ferré	8 July	Animated
Mundo grúa	Pablo Trapero	17 June	
Música de Laura	Juan Carlos Arch	1 January	
Ni el tiro del final	Juan José Campanella	14 January	
La noche del coyote	Iván Entel	4 February	
O - Z
Padre Mugica	Gabriel Mariotto and Gustavo E. Gordillo	26 August	Documentary
Pozo de zorro	Miguel Mirra	17 June	
Los presos de Bragado	Mariana Arruti	25 February	
Río escondido Río escondido	Mercedes García Guevara	9 September	
El secreto de los Andes	Alejandro Azzano	15 July	
El siglo del viento	Fernando Birri	15 April	
Silvia Prieto	Martín Rejtman	27 May	
Soriano	Eduardo Montes Bradley	22 April	
Tres veranos	Raúl Tosso	10 June	
La venganza	Juan Carlos Desanzo	20 May	
El viento se llevó lo que	Alejandro Agresti	15 April	
El visitante	Javier Olivera	8 April	
Yepeto	Eduardo Calcagno	6 May	

== See also ==
- 1999 in Argentina

== External links and references ==
- Argentine films of 1999 at the Internet Movie Database
