= 1995 in Argentina =

- Decades: 1970s; 1980s; 1990s; 2000s; 2010s
- See also: Other events of 1995; List of years in Argentina

The following are events from the year 1995 in Argentina.

== Incumbents ==
- President: Carlos Menem
- Vice President:
  - Vacant (until 8 July)
  - Carlos Ruckauf, (from 8 July)

=== Governors ===
- Governor of Buenos Aires Province: Eduardo Duhalde
- Governor of Misiones Province: Ramón Puerta
- Governor of Santa Cruz Province: Nestor Kirchner
- Governor of Tucumán Province:
  - Palito Ortega (until October 29)
  - Antonio Domingo Bussi (from October 29)

== Events ==
=== May ===
- 14 May: Argentine general elections take place with Carlos Menem (Partido Justicialista) being reelected President of Argentina. Menem obtains 49.7% of the votes, surpassing the 45% threshold required to avoid a runoff. The Justicialist Party (Partido Justicialista) also secure a clear legislative majority.

=== November ===
- 3 November: A series of explosions occur at the Río Tercero Military Factory in Córdoba, resulting in seven fatalities and over 300 injuries. The blast destroys the factory and causes extensive damage to the surrounding city.

== Births ==
=== January ===
- 19 January - Maxi Rolón, footballer (d. 2022)

=== March ===
- 9 March - Ángel Correa, footballer

=== April ===
- 21 April - María José Granatto, field hockey player

=== October ===
- 1 October - Agostina Alonso, field hockey player

== Deaths ==
=== January ===
- 8 January - Carlos Monzón, boxer (b. 1942)

=== February ===
- 4 February - Abel Santa Cruz, screenwriter (b. 1915)

=== March ===
- 20 March - Luis Saslavsky, film director and producer (b. 1903)

=== July ===
- 17 July - Juan Manuel Fangio, race car driver (b. 1911)

=== August ===
- 13 August - Margarita Padín, actress (b. 1910)

== See also ==
- List of Argentine films of 1995
