= 1919 in Argentina =

- Decades: 1890s; 1900s; 1910s; 1920s; 1930s
- See also: Other events of 1919; List of years in Argentina

Events from the year 1919 in Argentina

== Incumbents ==
- President: Hipólito Yrigoyen
- Vice President: Pelagio B. Luna

=== Governors ===
- Buenos Aires Province: José Camilo Crotto
- Cordoba: Julio Borda then Rafael Núñez
- Mendoza Province:
  - until 17 February: José Néstor Lencinas
  - 17 February-12 April: Tomás de Veyga
  - 12 April-25 July: Perfecto Araya
  - from 25 July: José Néstor Lencinas

=== Vice Governors ===
- Buenos Aires Province: Luis Monteverde

== Events ==
- January 7–14 - Tragic Week (Argentina)

== Births ==
=== May ===
- May 7 – Eva Perón, First Lady

=== July ===
- July 3 – Mauro Cía, boxer

=== August ===
- August 7 – Bertha Moss, actress

== Deaths ==
- June 25 - Pelagio Luna, politician
