= Ricardo de Aparici =

Argentine politician (1940–2019)

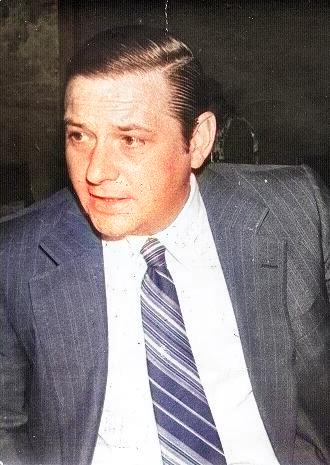
Ricardo de Aparici

Ricardo de Aparici (23 June 1940 – 19 December 2019) was an Argentine politician and governor of the province of Jujuy between 1987 and 1990.
