= 1916 in Argentina =

- Decades: 1890s; 1900s; 1910s; 1920s; 1930s
- See also: Other events of 1916; List of years in Argentina

Events during the year 1916 in Argentina

== Incumbents ==
- President: Victorino de la Plaza (until 12 October); Hipólito Yrigoyen (after 12 October)
- Vice president: Pelagio Luna (after 12 October)

== Events ==
- 2 April – A general election takes place.

== Births ==
- 11 April – Alberto Ginastera, composer (died 1983)
- 15 June – Horacio Salgán, tango musician (died 2016)
- 29 October – Antonio Fondevilla, sprinter (died 1965)
