= Oliver Benítez =

Argentine footballer

Personal information
- Full name: Oliver Paz Benítez
- Date of birth: 7 June 1991 (age 35)
- Place of birth: Puerto Iguazú, Argentina
- Height: 1.86 m (6 ft 1 in)
- Position: Centre-back

Team information
- Current team: Deportivo Táchira F.C.
- Number: 6

Youth career
- Gimnasia La Plata

Senior career*
Years	Team	Apps	(Gls)
2010-2018	Gimnasia La Plata	86	(2)
2016	→ Tigre (loan)	16	(1)
2018	→ Palestino (loan)	15	(2)
2019-2020	San Martín Tucumán	11	(0)
2020-2022	Patronato	49	(3)
2022-2023	Lamia	2	(0)
2023-2024	Sport Boys	35	(1)
2024	Deportivo Táchira F.C.	8	(1)
2024–2025	Olimpia	9	(0)
2026–	Mitre	0	(0)
- * Club domestic league appearances and goals as of 20 March 2026

Oliver Paz Benítez (born 7 June 1991) is an Argentine professional footballer who plays as a centre-back for Primera Nacional club Mitre.

== Career ==
Born in Puerto Iguazú, Misiones, Benítez finished his formation with Gimnasia La Plata. On 6 November 2010 he made his first-team – and Primera División – debut, coming on as a late substitute for Milton Casco in a 1–0 home win against Quilmes.

Benítez remained as a backup during the following years, also suffering relegation in 2012. He scored his first senior goal on 28 May 2013, netting the last in a 2–0 away win against Instituto in the Primera B Nacional.

After being immediately promoted back to the top tier, Benítez was more utilized in the main squad, but as a left back. He scored his first goal in the category on 16 August 2015, netting his team's second in a 4–2 home success over Argentinos Juniors.
