= Ricardo Gangeme =

Argentine journalist (1943–1999)

- Born: August 24, 1943; Argentina
- Died: May 13, 1999 (aged 55); Trelew, Chubut, Argentina
- Cause of death: Gunshot wound to head
- Occupations: Editor and founder
- Years active: 1957–1999
- Employer: El Informador Chubutense
- Known for: Controversial works
- Children: Pablo Gangeme

Ricardo Gangeme (August 24, 1943 – May 13, 1999), was an Argentine journalist, editor and founder of the newspaper El Informador Chubutense in Buenos Aires, Argentina, who was known for writing articles exposing corruption of political leaders and entrepreneurs until his killing in Trelew, Chubut Province, Argentina.

== Personal ==
Ricardo Gangeme started his journalism career at a young age. He had a son named Pablo Gangeme

== Career ==
In 1957, at the age of 14, Gangeme started working at the Buenos Aires weekly magazine Que. He spent 16 years with the tabloid Crónica. Between the years 1976 and 1992, he directed Radio Argentina. In 1992, Gangeme moved to Trelew where he was the editor for the daily La Jornada until 1998. Toward the end of that year, Gangeme founded the weekly El Informador Chubutense in Trelew. This newspaper was known for reveling intimate details about local authorities and businessmen in attempt to uncover the corruption.

== Death ==
Trelew is located in Argentina and shown relative to the capital Buenos Aires.

Gangeme was killed around 1:28 a.m. outside of his apartment building in Trelew on May 13, 1999. He was found inside his car with a gunshot wound to the head and slumped over the steering wheel of his parked Chevrolet outside his downtown apartment, which was located in the center of Trelew and 100 meters from the local police station. The Smith & Wesson .38 calibre handgun round entered close to his left eye and did not exit which was the cause of the journalist's death. His corpse was found around 8:00 a.m. the next morning. Police did not consider it a robbery as he was found with $1,500 in his pocket. A few days before the incident, Gangeme had reported to the police he was receiving threats for his recent publication about local corruption. Gangeme held a reputation for investigating corruption in business and government circles.

The motive for the murder may have been influenced by Gangeme's recent publication about the corruption of high authority locals and business men. Gangeme reported threats to the police a few days before the murder occurred. Businessman Hector Fernández, owner of Corralon Fernández, was suspected of attempting to run Gangeme over with his car prior to his murder and also threatening him based on reported business transactions with the Trelew Electric Company, but Fernández publicly denied that accusation in news reports. Gangeme was known to have many enemies due to his risky publications and the exposure in his magazine of high government and business officials.

The three suspects, Osvaldo Daniel Viti, Gustavo Fabian Smith, and Alejandro Zabala, were tried in court for the murder of Gangeme, but they were all acquitted in 2002 by the Criminal Court of Northwest Chubut. During the trial it was discovered that the gun and fingerprints did not match the suspects'. The case has become an unsolved murder.

== Context ==
A few years previous to Gangeme's death, one of the most important legal developments was occurring in Argentina. The law that needed reformed was the criminal defamation law. If this law was successful in its reform, Argentina would have one of the best legal frameworks for press freedom in Latin America.

The Argentine Supreme Court decided to add "actual malice" to their neutral reporting standards. This means that plaintiffs must prove the published information is false and that the journalist knew it was false at the time of publication. In 1986 it was decided that plaintiffs may not sue a journalist for accurately producing information about a public figure. This provides significant protection to Argentine journalist. It play a major role in rival against journalist. In 1997, the President at the time, Carlos Menem said that citizen's had a right to give the press a beating. Two years after this statement, Gangeme was shot dead.

== Impact ==
Gangeme oftentimes walked a fine line between walked controversy and sensationalism in his publications. His exposure of businessmen, companies and other government officials significantly impacted the entire Argentine journalist community.

The murder of Gangeme is important because he is one of the most recent cases of a journalist killed not only in his country but also in the world. Gangeme pursued his right to freedom of speech no matter what. The number of threats and violence toward journalists never stopped Gangeme from publishing against one of the biggest companies in his country, Trelew Electric Cooperative in Chubut. He published concerns about their business and financial interactions with the government. Gangeme reveling the company's secrets essentially aided in the Argentine government's economics.

== Reactions ==
The Organization of American States issued a report stating that investigative journalism was mostly likely the motive behind the killing of Gangeme.

The Committee to Protect Journalists issued the following statement by its executive director Ann K. Cooper: "We hope that the investigation will soon reach a successful conclusion. While we are encouraged by the reactions of Carlos Saúl Menem and other authorities in condemning this crime, we remind you that many previous attacks against journalists have gone unpunished. We call on you to see to it that the investigation into Gangeme's murder continues, so that the authors of the crime will be captured and the motive established. We hope the investigation into this murder will be exemplary, demonstrating your commitment to ensuring that those who seek to silence journalists through violence are duly punished."

The organization known as the Argentine Federation of Press Workers condemned the murder of its colleague, while journalists from "El Informador Chubutense" asked for and obtained police protection.

Gangeme's son believes it is more than clear what happened, and there were even witnesses of irregularities.
