= Juan Argerich =

Argentine politician and writer

Juan Antonio Argerich (1862–1924) was an Argentine statesman and internationally renowned writer who was elected six times to the Argentine National Congress.

Among the many policies that he furthered during his tenure was the elimination of electoral colleges for presidential elections in favor of popular votes. This allowed minority party candidates to be included on popular ballots.

He established a national immigration policy to eliminate arbitrary decisions and provided a legal path to naturalization and deportation within the framework of due process. He also improved the governance structure within the federal capital city of Buenos Aires. This improvement broadened federal court jurisdictions in certain legal cases and defined the establishment of trial by jury in criminal cases in a way that would guarantee due legal process as well as prerogatives of the government's legislative branch.

His best known literary work is the novel ¿Inocentes o culpables? (1884), which made the case for hardline immigration reform at a time when many Europeans were moving to Argentina.
