= Aníbal Verón =

Argentine activist (died 2000)

Aníbal Verón was a bus driver from Salta, Argentina. On 10 November 2000 he was protesting together with other workers from his company, who had been fired with unpaid salaries seven months overdue. The protest was harshly repressed, and Verón (aged 37 at the time) was shot and killed.

Since then, Verón became a political martyr for the unemployed workers of Argentina. An activist organization of piqueteros was named after him CTD Aníbal Verón, or MTD Anibal Veron.
