= Maximiliano Martínez (footballer, born June 1992) =

Argentine footballer

Personal information
- Full name: Esteban Maximiliano Martínez
- Date of birth: 21 June 1992 (age 34)
- Place of birth: San Salvador de Jujuy, Argentina
- Height: 1.71 m (5 ft 7 1/2 in)
- Position: Midfielder

Senior career*
| Years | Team | Apps | (Gls) |
| 2013 | Gimnasia y Tiro | 2 | (0) |
| 2013–2015 | Talleres | 54 | (17) |
| 2016 | Central Norte | 9 | (3) |
| 2016–2017 | Gimnasia y Tiro | 0 | (0) |
| 2017 | Racing de Olavarría | 20 | (1) |
| 2018 | Real Potosí | 4 | (0) |
| 2018 | Sarmiento | 1 | (0) |
| 2019 | Independiente Petrolero | | |
| 2020 | Chalatenango | 4 | (0) |
- * Club domestic league appearances and goals

Esteban Maximiliano Martínez (born 21 June 1992) is an Argentine professional footballer who plays as a midfielder.

== Career ==
Martínez's first senior career club became Gimnasia y Tiro in 2013, who he featured for during the 2012–13 Torneo Argentino A; making his debut against Guaraní Antonio Franco on 20 February. Talleres of Torneo Argentino B signed Martínez six months later. After two and a half years with the club, during which time he scored seventeen goals in fifty-four appearances, Martínez completed a move to fellow Torneo Federal B outfit Central Norte. He remained for 2016, prior to sealing a return to Gimnasia for the 2016–17 Torneo Federal A. A further move to Racing de Olavarría came in late-2017; along with one goal in twenty.

In January 2018, Martínez joined Bolivian Primera División side Real Potosí. His first appearance in professional football came on 11 March versus Universitario de Sucre, playing the final twenty-three minutes of a 3–1 defeat. In total, he was selected five times for Real Potosí. The following June saw Martínez arrive back in Argentina after agreeing to join Torneo Federal A's Sarmiento. Martínez moved back to Bolivian football with Independiente Petrolero in January 2019. In 2020, Martínez went to El Salvador with Chalatenango. He debuted in a loss to Jocoro in February, which was one of four matches for them.

Martínez terminated his contract at the end of April, after experiencing many issues; including withheld wages and lack of action due to new ownership. He was also stranded in El Salvador during the COVID-19 pandemic, a period in which Chalatenango made him and teammate Marcos González depart their club apartment; having paid them their wages. Martínez ended up leaving the country via a plane made available by the Argentine government, flying from Comalapa to Buenos Aires before undertaking a 1400 km+ bus journey from the capital to his hometown; he was unable to leave the bus due to COVID-19 protocols.

== Career statistics ==
As of 28 October 2020.

Club statistics
| Club | Season | League | | | Cup | | League Cup | | Continental | | Other | | Total | |
| Club | Season | Division | Apps | Goals | Apps | Goals | Apps | Goals | Apps | Goals | Apps | Goals | Apps | Goals |
|---|---|---|---|---|---|---|---|---|---|---|---|---|---|---|
| Gimnasia y Tiro | 2012–13 | Torneo Argentino A | 2 | 0 | 0 | 0 | — | | — | | 0 | 0 | 2 | 0 |
| Central Norte | 2016 | Torneo Federal B | 9 | 3 | 0 | 0 | — | | — | | 0 | 0 | 9 | 3 |
| Gimnasia y Tiro | 2016–17 | Torneo Federal A | 0 | 0 | 0 | 0 | — | | — | | 0 | 0 | 0 | 0 |
| Racing de Olavarría | 2017–18 | Torneo Federal B | 20 | 1 | 0 | 0 | — | | — | | 0 | 0 | 20 | 1 |
| Real Potosí | 2018 | Bolivian Primera División | 4 | 0 | — | | — | | — | | 1 (Note: Appearance(s) in the Bolivian Primera División play-offs) | 0 | 5 | 0 |
| Sarmiento | 2018–19 | Torneo Federal A | 1 | 0 | 0 | 0 | — | | — | | 0 | 0 | 1 | 0 |
| Chalatenango | 2019–20 | Salvadoran Primera División | 4 | 0 | 0 | 0 | — | | — | | 0 | 0 | 4 | 0 |
| Career total | | | 40 | 4 | 0 | 0 | — | | — | | 1 | 0 | 41 | 4 |
