= La cumparsita rock 72 =

Argentine rock band

La Cumparsita Rock 72
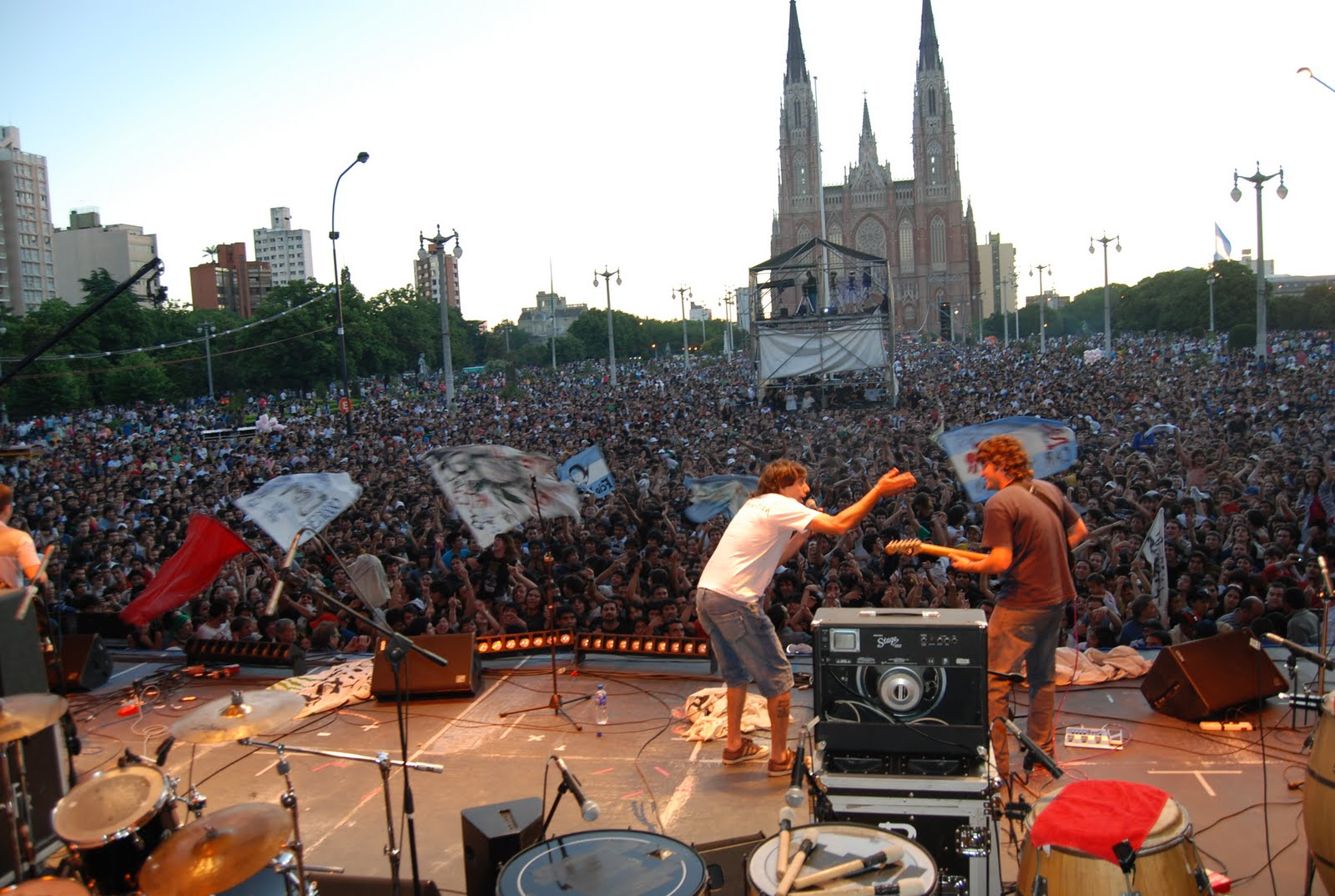
- La Cumparsita Rock 72 live at Moreno Square, La Plata (2007)

Background information
- Origin: La Plata, Buenos Aires, Argentina
- Genres: Argentine rock, Rock en Español
- Years active: 2001–present
- Members: Emiliano "Fino" Santillán; Gastón Tocho; Nazareno "Rengo" Michelini; Patricio "Pato" Pisauri
- Past members: Augusto "Cara" Graciosi; Martin "Negro" Tebes; Emanuel Rodriguez; Leandro Gabrieloni; Martin "Profe" Arramón; Alejandro "Lija" Ocampo

La Cumparsita Rock 72 is an Argentine rock band formed in Villa Elvira, La Plata, Argentina in 2001.

== Discography ==
=== Todo en la estacion (2004) ===
1. Mi Solucion
2. Circunvalacion
3. Timba nacional
4. Femenina de placer
5. Peleando la soledad
6. Una vez mas
7. Nena
8. ¿Que pasa?
9. Solo en una noche
10. Una de esas cosas no me iba a enloquecer
11. La 72

=== El Misterio de lo sencillo (2010) ===
1. Un barco en el charco
2. A lo lejos
3. Reggae fumon
4. Puede que haya mas
5. Perdimos el tiempo
6. Tierra del arte
7. Sinceridad
8. El surco
9. Vicente
10. Otoño amanecer
11. La negra matonga
12. Circunvalacion (Bonus Track - hidden pregap before track 1)

=== Live albums ===
- Vivo en Atenas (2006)

== See also ==
- Argentine rock
