= Lázaro Chiappe =

Argentine lawyer and politician (1936–2024)

Member of the Argentine Senate for Corrientes Province
- In office 10 December 2001 – 9 December 2003
- Preceded by: Ángel Francisco Pardo
- Succeeded by: Fabián Ríos

Personal details
- Born: Lázaro Alberto Chiappe; 15 November 1936 Goya, Corrientes Province, Argentina
- Died: 8 May 2024 (aged 87) Goya, Corrientes Province, Argentina
- Party: PLC
- Occupation: Lawyer

Lázaro Chiappe (15 November 1936 – 8 May 2024) was an Argentine lawyer and politician. A member of the Liberal Party of Corrientes, he served in the Senate from 2001 to 2003.

Chiappe died in Goya on 8 May 2024, at the age of 87.
