= 1998 Argentina rugby union tour of Japan and Europe =

Summary
P	W	D	L
Total
2	1	0	1
Test match
1	0	0	1
Opponent
P	W	D	L
Japan
1	0	0	1

1998 Argentina rugby union tour of Japan and Europe
Summary
P	W	D	L
Total
6	2	0	4
Test match
3	0	0	3
Opponent
P	W	D	L
Italy
1	0	0	1
Wales
1	0	0	1
France
1	0	0	1

The 1998 Argentina rugby union tour of Japan and Europe were two a series of matches played by the Argentina national rugby union team . The first tour (two match) was held in September, the second in November.

== Matches ==
=== in Japan ===
Scores and results list Argentina's points tally first.

Opposing Team	For	Against	Date	Venue	Status
Japan XV	51	28	12/9/1998	Nagai, Osaka	Tour Match
Japan	29	44	15/9/1998	Chichibu, Tokyo	Test Match

=== In Europe ===
Scores and results list Argentina's points tally first.

Opposing Team	For	Against	Date	Venue	Status
Italy A	31	9	3/11/1998	Stadio Rocchi, Viterbo	Tour Match
Italy	19	23	7/11/1998	St.Garilli, Piacenza	Test Match
French Barbarians	30	38	11/11/1998	Bourgoin	Tour Match
France	14	34	14/11/1998	Nantes	Test Match
Wales A	26	19	18/11/1998	Pontypridd	Tour Match
Wales	30	43	21/11/1998	Stradey Park, Llanelli	Test Match

== Sources ==
- Union Argentina de Rugby (January 1999). "MEMORIA Temporada año 1998" (.doc) (in Spanish).
