= 1905 in Argentina =

- Decades: 1880s; 1890s; 1900s; 1910s; 1920s
- See also: Other events of 1905; List of years in Argentina

Events in the year 1905 in Argentina.

== Incumbents ==
- President: Manuel Quintana
- Vice President: José Figueroa Alcorta

=== Governors ===
- Buenos Aires Province: Marcelino Ugarte
- Cordoba: José Vicente de Olmos (until month unknown)
- Mendoza Province: Carlos Galigniana Segura then José Néstor Lencinas then Carlos Galigniana Segura

=== Vice Governors ===
- Buenos Aires Province: Adolfo Saldías

== Events ==
- February 4–8: Argentine Revolution of 1905
- May 21: demonstration consisting of thousands of workers gathered at Constitution Square and marched from there to the Plaza Lavalle, where the concentration was attacked with bullets and sabers. 2 people are killed and 20 are injured.
- August 11: attack against Quintana, while his coach went on to Government House, a man fired several times at Quintana. The president's coach continued on and the custody officers arrested the perpetrator, who was a Catalan laborer named Salvador Planas y Virelles, sympathetic anarchist who acted on his own initiative

== Births ==
=== January ===
- 17 January – Guillermo Stábile, football player and manager (died 1966)
- 25 January – Corina del Parral, writer, poet, singer, and composer, First Lady of Ecuador (died 1979)

=== February ===
- 22 February - Luis Sandrini, actor (died 1980)

=== July ===
- 30 July - Pedro Quartucci, boxer and actor (died 1983)

== Bibliography ==
- Cárdenas, Eduardo; Paya, Carlos (1975). En camino a la democracia política, 1904-1910. Buenos Aires: La Bastilla. ISBN 950-25-0000-8.
- Luna, Félix (1964). Yrigoyen. Buenos Aires: Desarrollo.
- Pigna, Felipe (2005). Los mitos de la historia argentina 2. Buenos Aires: Planeta. ISBN 950-49-1342-3.
- Lanata, Jorge (2003). Argentinos Tomo: 2. Buenos Aires: Ediciones B Argentina. ISBN 950-15-2259-8.
- Castro, Nelson (2005). Enfermos de poder. Buenos Aires: Vergara. ISBN 950-15-2371-3.
