= 2004 Argentine energy crisis =

Natural gas supply shortage

The Argentine energy crisis was a natural gas supply shortage experienced by Argentina in 2004. After the recession triggered by the Argentine economic crisis (1999-2002), Argentina's energy demands grew quickly as industry recovered, but extraction and transportation of natural gas, a cheap and relatively abundant fossil fuel, did not match the surge.

According to estimates, 50% of the electricity generated in Argentina depends on gas-powered plants. The national energy matrix has no emergency reserves and by 2004 it was functioning at the top of its capacity. At this point, barely emerging from the seasonal low demand caused by summer, many industrial facilities and power plants started suffering intermittent cuts in their supply of natural gas. Between February and May the cuts amounted to an average of 9.5 million m^{3} a day, about 13% of industrial demand, and by the end of May they grew to a maximum of 22 million m^{3}. The most seriously affected regions were the capital, certain regions of the province of Buenos Aires, and the province of La Pampa.

As winter approached, the Argentine government announced that it would restrict natural gas exports in order to preserve the supply for internal consumption, both domestic and industrial, in compliance with the Hydrocarbons Law. These export cuts would seriously harm Chile and affect Uruguay and Brazil.

The Chilean Minister of Economy and Energy, Jorge Rodríguez, warned Argentina that supply contracts with Chilean companies must be fulfilled. This caused a mild diplomatic crisis. Chile imports more than 90% of its natural gas from Argentina and depends heavily on it to generate electricity; it has shifted the focus from coal and oil towards gas, and had five gas pipelines built for the specific purpose of getting gas from Argentina.

== Causes ==
The energy crisis was blamed on a number of factors. Former Argentine President Néstor Kirchner attributed it on lack of investment on the part of the private companies that extract the resource (such as Repsol YPF), and the concomitant lack of pressure from past governments on those companies.

The private corporations contended that their profits after the collapse of the Argentine economy were severely hurt by the freezing of domestic and industrial fees since 2002. Natural gas remained at the same price during the inflationary process caused by the devaluation of the Argentine peso, while the prices of gasoline and diesel were adjusted upwards, which increased the demand for gas as a cheap alternative fuel and at the same time discouraged its production. In addition to this, a larger part of the supply of natural gas was required to compensate for a smaller yield of hydroelectricity.

The exporters complained that heavy export tariffs compounded with the price freezing and prevented them from investing on more surveyance and further exploitation, thus leaving them unable to keep up with demand. However, the government and critics of the neoliberal model of the Menem administration point out that the privatized companies obtained huge profits during the 1990s.

== Remedies ==
In order to diminish the impact of the crisis, three measures were suggested: buying natural gas from Bolivia, which has abundant reserves of it; directly buying electricity from Brazil, which generates a large part of it using hydroelectric power plants; and importing oil from Venezuela.

For historical reasons, Bolivia would not sell natural gas to Chile. Moreover, it lacks the infrastructure to convey it. A projected gas pipeline that would transport massive amounts of gas to Argentina was delayed by the critical political situation in Bolivia during 2003. Moreover, some people and organizations in Bolivia have expressed strong disagreement about the idea of exporting gas, calling the energy crisis "a fiction".

The Venezuelan Chávez administration, which at the time was politically close to the Argentine government, signed energy accords that including sending fuel oil tankers to Argentina at reduced costs, through PDVSA (the Venezuelan state oil company). Fuel oil (imported or otherwise) is, in any case, considerably more expensive than natural gas.

In addition to industrial supply, Argentina employs Compressed Natural Gas for stoves, ovens, etc., and as fuel for over 1.4 million natural gas vehicles. While the possibility of restricting domestic usage was considered, it was deemed unnecessary and disruptive.

As a response to the 2001 economic crisis, electricity tariffs were converted to the Argentine peso and frozen in January 2002 through the Public Emergency and Exchange Regime Law. Together with high inflation (see Economy of Argentina) and the devaluation of the peso, many companies in the sector had to deal with high levels of debt in foreign currency under a scenario in which their revenues remained stable while their costs increased. This situation has led to severe underinvestment and unavailability to keep up with an increasing demand, factors that contributed to the 2003-2004 energy crisis. Since 2003, the government has been in the process of introducing modifications that allow for tariff increases. Industrial and commercial consumers' tariffs have already been raised (near 100% in nominal terms and 50% in real terms), but residential tariffs still remain the same. Nevertheless, the national government even tried to profit from the crisis by creating a new oil company, Enarsa, with 53% of state control and full exploitation rights over offshore areas.

== Winter 2005 ==
As 2004 passed with no major disruptions, some people claimed that the so-called "energy crisis" had in fact turned out a minor complication, inflated by the government and the media. In a broader context, though, it is still true that investments on exploitation of energy resources, as well as energy production and distribution, are insufficient. In March 2005, President Kirchner admitted that "for a long time the possibility will remain that we must move on the brink [of a crisis]". However, the government also pointed out that remedies are on the works, and that Argentina is better prepared than in 2004 to face problems with energy generation.

In the meantime, fuel oil supply from Venezuela has continued, amounting to 50 million tonnes sent in two ships (in April and May) by PDVSA, in a coordinated effort with the Brazilian oil company Petrobras and the Electrical Market Management Company of Argentina (Cammesa).

Analysts and officials, such as former President of Uruguay Jorge Batlle, have remarked that a full-fledged protocol for energetic integration of Mercosur should be outlined and brought into action as soon as possible to coordinate energy production and distribution in the region.

== See also ==
- Energy crisis
