= Marcelo Muniagurria =

Former Argentine politician (died 2019)

Marcelo Julio Muniagurria (1946 – 11 May 2019) was an Argentine politician, agricultural engineer and ruralist born in Rosario, Santa Fe, Argentina.

== Biography ==
Muniagurria held a degree in Agricultural Engineering and dedicated himself to citrus farming in La Concepción. During the early 1990s, he was also editor of the agricultural section of the Argentinian newspaper, La Capital, and later a director at the National Institute of Agricultural Technology (INTA).

During his political career, Muniagurria served as a national deputy for justicialism between 1991 and 1995. He was president of the Confederaciones Rurales Argentinas (Argentine Rural Confederations; CRA) between 1997 and 1999, as well as president of the Sociedad Rural de Rosario (Rosario Rural Society; SRR). Additionally, he held the position of vice governor of Santa Fe between 1999 and 2003, with Carlos Reutemann as governor. He later served as one of the political representatives of PRO within his province.

Muniagurria also became involved in the property sector in Fighiera, Santa Fe, establishing a business partnership with Jorge Messi, the father of the Argentine footballer Lionel Messi.

== Death ==
Muniagurria died on the morning of 11 May 2019 in Rosario at the age of 72. His cause of death was due to an illness that worsened over a short period of time.
