= Pablo Verani =

Argentine politician

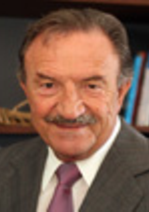

National Senator
- In office 10 December 2007 – 25 September 2013
- Constituency: Río Negro

Governor of Río Negro
- In office 9 December 1995 – 10 December 2003
- Vice Governor: Bautista Mendioroz
- Preceded by: Horacio Massaccesi
- Succeeded by: Miguel Saiz

Personal details
- Born: 7 February 1938 Province of Reggio Emilia, Italy
- Died: 25 September 2013 (aged 75) General Roca, Río Negro Province, Argentina
- Citizenship: Argentine
- Party: Radical Civic Union

Pablo Federico Verani (7 February 1938 – 25 September 2013) was an Italian-born Argentine politician, formerly of the Radical Civic Union (UCR) who served as Governor of Río Negro from 1995 to 2003.

== Early life and education ==
Verani was born in the Province of Reggio Emilia, Italy, in 1938 to a well-to-do farming family, and his father was prominent in provincial politics. The elder Verani was separated from his family, however, when he joined the Italian resistance, and they were not reunited until after the Allied liberation of the region. The family left Italy in 1947, and settled in Allen, Río Negro, then a largely agrarian community in the Argentine Patagonia region.

The Veranis prospered, and Pablo Verani completed his studies in Buenos Aires, earning a law degree at the University of Buenos Aires in 1964. He returned to Río Negro and inherited his share in the family orchards, later purchasing the Deportivo Roca football team (a 4th level team). This latter venture proved a bad investment, however, and he returned to farming.

== Political career ==
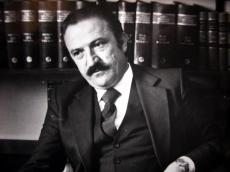
Verani as Governor of Río Negro.

His tenure at owner of the football club made him well known in the province, and he was elected Mayor of General Roca, the province's largest city, in 1983. He joined Horacio Massaccesi as running mate on the UCR gubernatorial ticket in 1987, and served in the post until 1991, when he was elected to the Provincial Legislature. Following a term as UCR caucus leader, he was elected Governor of Río Negro in 1995 and was re-elected in 1999. His tenure was marked by significant investments in roads, irrigation works, rural electrification, as well as higher subsidies for apple and pear exporters. After stepping down in 2003, Verani then served as provincial minister for planning and development.

Verani was elected President of the provincial chapter of the UCR. Like his successor as governor, Miguel Saiz, Verani is a leading figure in the ranks of those Radicals who support the ruling Front for Victory of President Cristina Fernández de Kirchner and Néstor Kirchner, the so-called Radicales K. Following a struggle to wrest control of the provincial party, Verani and Saiz were expelled from the UCR in December 2007.

Verani was elected as the third-seat Senator for his province, on the Alliance Consensus for Development ticket. He represented Río Negro Province in the Argentine Senate on the Plural Consensus caucus, which supports the Front for Victory, and chaired the Committee on Science and Technology. Verani announced his support for his erstwhile Vice-Governor, Bautista Mendioroz, to run against Governor Saiz in the UCR primaries ahead the 2011 gubernatorial race.

Pablo Verani died on 25 September 2013.
