= Vice President of Argentina =

Second-highest constitutional office in Argentina

Vice President of the Argentine Nation
- Vicepresidente de la Nación Argentina
- National standard

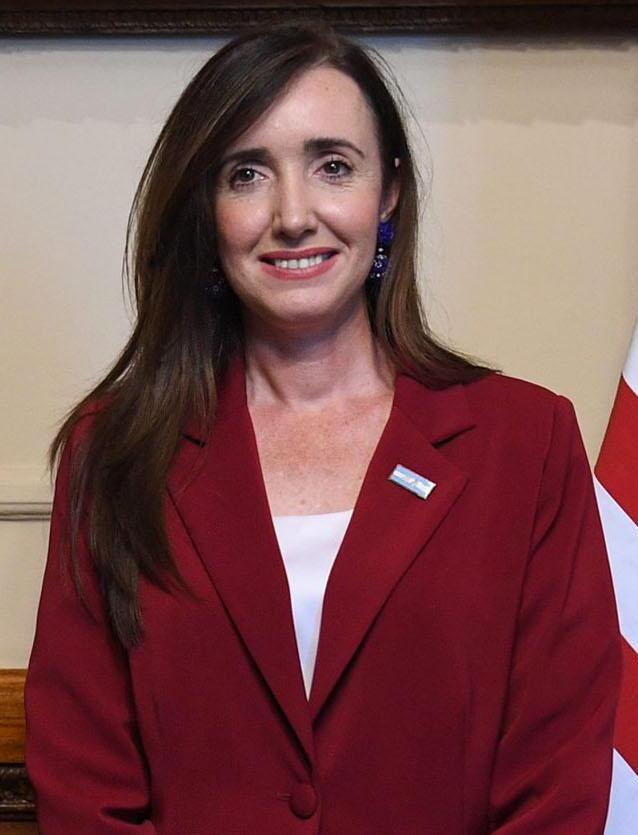
- Incumbent; Victoria Villarruel since 10 December 2023
- Style: The Most Excellent
- Status: Second highest executive branch officer
- Member of: Executive branch of the Government of Argentina
- Residence: Private residence
- Seat: Buenos Aires
- Term length: Four years, renewable once
- Inaugural holder: Salvador María del Carril
- Formation: Argentine Constitution of 1853
- Succession: First
- Website: casarosada.gob.ar

The vice president of Argentina (Spanish: vicepresidente de Argentina), officially known as the vice president of the Argentine Nation (Spanish: vicepresidente de la Nación Argentina), is the second highest political position in Argentina, and first in the line of succession to the president of Argentina.

The office was established with the enactment of the Argentine Constitution of 1853.

The vice president assumes presidential duties in a caretaker capacity in case of absence or temporary incapacity of the head of state, and may succeed to the presidency in case of resignation, permanent incapacity, or death of the president. The longest vice presidential tenure as caretaker in Argentine history took place between 1865 and 1868, while President Bartolomé Mitre was preoccupied with the Paraguayan War. Seven Argentine vice presidents have succeeded to the presidency: Juan Esteban Pedernera (1861); Carlos Pellegrini (1890); José Evaristo Uriburu (1895); José Figueroa Alcorta (1906); Victorino de la Plaza (1914); Ramón Castillo (1942); and Isabel Perón (1974).

The Argentine Constitution does not provide for the replacement of a vice president should their tenure be ended for any reason, and their office was thus made vacant on seventeen occasions since 1861 (see list).

The 1994 amendments modified the vice president's term—as well as the president's—from one unrenewable six-year term to two four-year terms renewable upon reelection of the joint ticket. The vice president acts also as the president of the Senate.

The current incumbent, Victoria Villarruel, took office on December 10, 2023.

== Current vice president ==
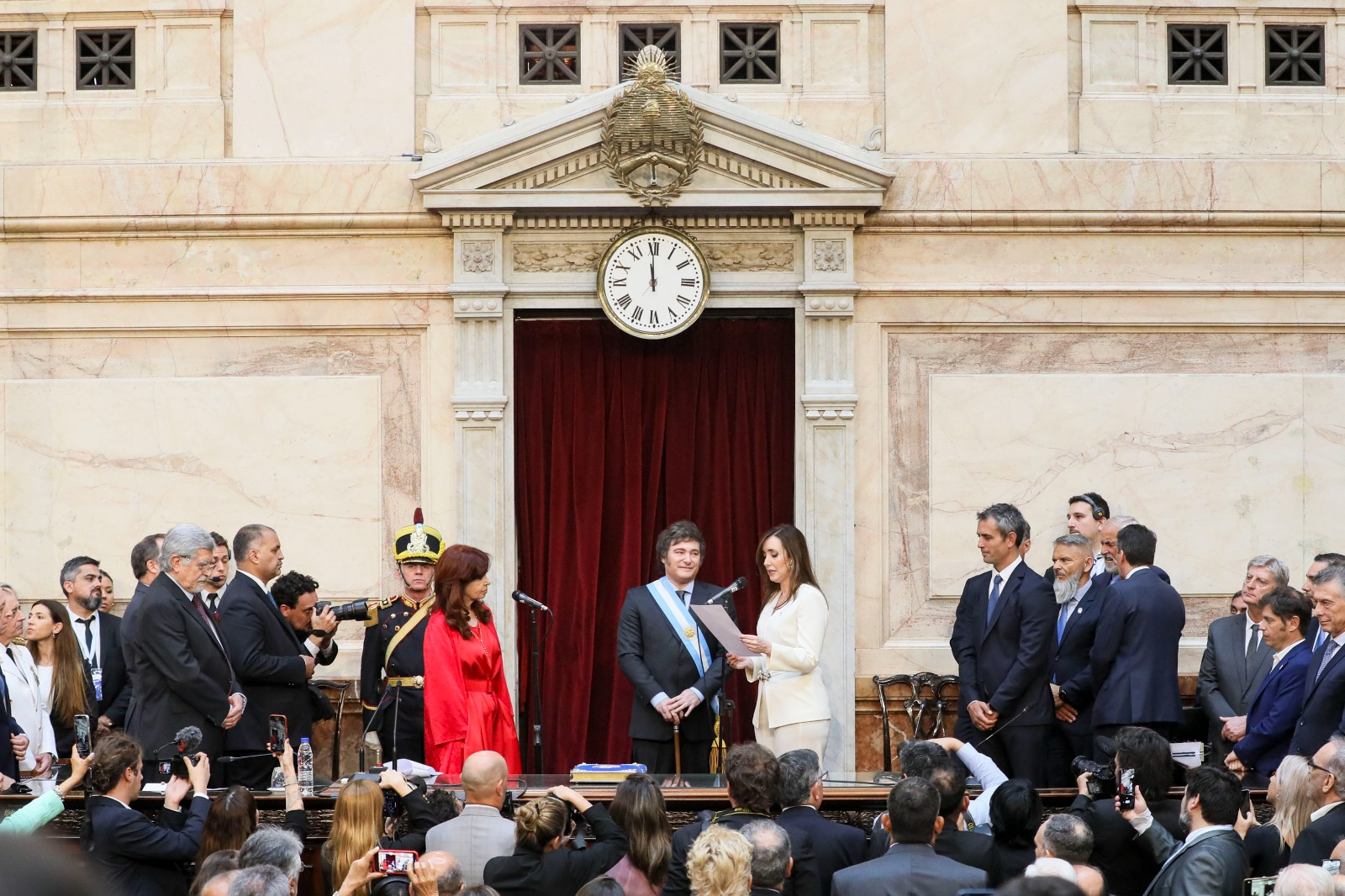
Victoria Villarruel sworn in as vice president of Argentina.

The current vice president of Argentina is Victoria Villarruel, of the Democratic Party (affiliated with La Libertad Avanza), who took office on December 10, 2023, after in the 2023 presidential elections the formula headed by Javier Milei won the contest in the second round with 55.65% of the votes.

== See also ==
- Politics of Argentina
- President of Argentina
  - List of heads of state of Argentina
- List of current vice presidents
