= 1871 in Argentina =

- Decades: 1850s; 1860s; 1870s; 1880s; 1890s
- See also: Other events of 1871; List of years in Argentina

Events in the year 1871 in Argentina.

== Incumbents ==
- President: Domingo Faustino Sarmiento
- Vice President: Adolfo Alsina

=== Governors ===
- Buenos Aires Province: Emilio de Castro y Rocha
- Cordoba: Félix de la Peña then Juan Antonio Álvarez
- Mendoza Province: Arístides Villanueva
- Santa Fe Province: Mariano Cabal then Simón de Iriondo

=== Vice Governors ===
- Buenos Aires Province: vacant

== Events ==
- 1 January – The Civil Code of Argentina, written by Dalmacio Vélez Sársfield, comes into effect.
- 27 January – Yellow Fever in Buenos Aires: Three cases of yellow fever are diagnosed in the San Telmo neighbourhood of Buenos Aires, which is full of tenements. The City Commission declines to warn the population of the danger of an epidemic.
- 4 March – The Tribune newspaper reports that the streets of fever-infested Buenos Aires are so dark at night that "it truly appeared as if the terrible scourge had swept away all the residents".
- 9–11 April – 500 deaths are registered daily in Buenos Aires as a result of the yellow fever epidemic.
- 7 May – Germany sends its first ambassador to Argentina.
- August – The East Argentine Railway company is founded by British investors.
- 24 October – The Argentine National Observatory is founded by President Domingo F. Sarmiento and the North American astronomer Benjamin Apthorp Gould.

== Deaths ==
- 20 February – Anthony Dominic Fahy, Irish Dominican Priest, missionary and head of Argentina's Irish community (born 1805)
- 14 March – Franklin Rawson, painter (born 1819; yellow fever)
- 24 March – José Roque Pérez, president of the People's Commission of Buenos Aires (yellow fever)
- 8 April – Francisco Javier Muñiz, soldier, naturalist, and medical doctor (born 1795; yellow fever)
- April 10 – Lucio Norberto Mansilla, general and governor
- April 23 – Sinforoso Amoedo, medical doctor
- May 25 – Manuel Argerich, medical doctor
