= 1870 in Argentina =

- Decades: 1850s; 1860s; 1870s; 1880s; 1890s
- See also: Other events of 1870; List of years in Argentina

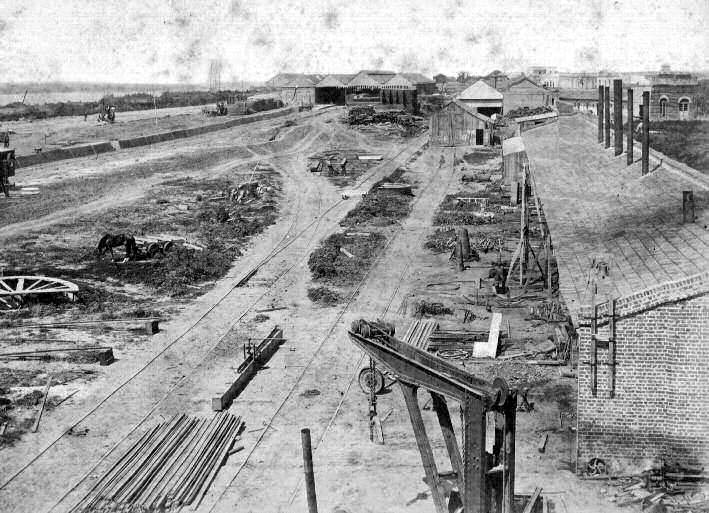
The Rosario Central station (owned by British "Central Argentine Railway") still under construction. Some elements (such as the main building and the tower with its clocks) would be constructed later.

Events in the year 1870 in Argentina.

== Incumbents ==
- President: Domingo Faustino Sarmiento
- Vice President: Adolfo Alsina

=== Governors ===
- Buenos Aires Province: Emilio de Castro y Rocha
- Cordoba: Félix de la Peña
- Mendoza Province: Nicolás Villanueva (until 16 October); Arístides Villanueva (from 16 October)
- Santa Fe Province: Mariano Cabal

=== Vice Governors ===
- Buenos Aires Province: vacant

== Events ==
- 1 March - End of the Paraguayan War. Following this, Argentina seeks to enforce one of the secret clauses of the Treaty of the Triple Alliance, which would have permitted it to annex a large portion of the Gran Chaco region. The Brazilian government, wishing to maintain Paraguay as a buffer with Argentina, it rejects the Argentine proposal.

== Births ==
- 21 February – Victor Mercante, educationist (died 1934)

== Deaths ==
- 12 March – Pastor Obligado, lawyer, Governor of the secessionist State of Buenos Aires 1853–1858 (born 1818)
- 11 April – Justo José de Urquiza, politician and general (born 1801)
