= 1873 in Argentina =

- Decades: 1850s; 1860s; 1870s; 1880s; 1890s
- See also: Other events of 1873; List of years in Argentina

Events in the year 1873 in Argentina.

== Incumbents ==
- President: Domingo Faustino Sarmiento
- Vice President: Adolfo Alsina

=== Governors ===
- Buenos Aires Province: Mariano Acosta
- Cordoba: Juan Antonio Álvarez
- Mendoza Province: Arístides Villanueva (until 16 October); Francisco Civit (from 16 October)
- Santa Fe Province: Simón de Iriondo

=== Vice Governors ===
- Buenos Aires Province: vacant

== Events ==
- September - The Argentine Chamber of Deputies approves the Secret Mutual Defense Treaty of 1873 and votes $6,000,000 towards the War of the Pacific.

== Births ==
- March 22 - Julieta Lanteri, Italian Argentine physician, freethinker, and women's rights activist (died 1932).
- May 17 - Julio Argentino Pascual Roca, politician and diplomat (died 1942)
- October 3 - Vicente Gallo, lawyer, academic and politician (died 1942)

== Deaths ==
- August 23 - Félix de la Peña, politician (born 1807 in Argentina, 1807)
