= 1868 in Argentina =

- Decades: 1840s; 1850s; 1860s; 1870s; 1880s
- See also: Other events of 1868; List of years in Argentina

Events in the year 1868 in Argentina.

== Incumbents ==
- President: Bartolomé Mitre (until 11 October); Domingo Faustino Sarmiento (from 12 October)
- Vice President: Marcos Paz (until 2 January); Adolfo Alsina (from 12 October)

=== Governors ===
- Buenos Aires Province: Adolfo Alsina (until 10 October); Emilio de Castro y Rocha (from 10 October)
- Cordoba: Félix de la Peña
- Mendoza Province: Nicolás Villanueva
- Santa Fe Province: Nicasio Oroño then Mariano Cabal

=== Vice Governors ===
- Buenos Aires Province: vacant

== Events ==
- 2 January – The sudden death of Vice President Marcos Paz, in a cholera epidemic at Buenos Aires, results in a vacancy that is not filled for several months.
- 12 April – The electoral college chooses Domingo Sarmiento as its new president by 79 out of 131 votes, making this the most closely contested election during the period.
- June – Henry G. Worthington becomes United States Ambassador to Argentina.

== Births ==
- 21 April – Rosendo Mendizabal, tango musician and composer (died 1913)
- 20 July – José Félix Uriburu, first de facto President of Argentina (died 1932)
- 4 October – Marcelo Torcuato de Alvear, politician and future President of Argentina (died 1942)
- 6 December – Lisandro de la Torre, politician (died 1939)

== Deaths ==
- 2 January – Marcos Paz, Vice President of Argentina (born 1813; cholera)
- 19 February – Venancio Flores, Uruguayan politician and general supported by Argentina (born 1808; assassinated)
- 23 October – Mariquita Sánchez, Buenos Aires salonnière (born 1786)
