= 1872 in Argentina =

- Decades: 1850s; 1860s; 1870s; 1880s; 1890s
- See also: Other events of 1872; List of years in Argentina

Events in the year 1872 in Argentina.

== Incumbents ==
- President: Domingo Faustino Sarmiento
- Vice President: Adolfo Alsina

=== Governors ===
- Buenos Aires Province: Emilio de Castro y Rocha (until 3 May); Mariano Acosta (from 3 May)
- Cordoba: Juan Antonio Álvarez
- Mendoza Province: Arístides Villanueva
- Santa Fe Province: Simón de Iriondo

=== Vice Governors ===
- Buenos Aires Province: vacant

== Events ==
- date unknown - The Argentine government awards the concession for the Buenos Aires and Pacific Railway to John E. Clark for the construction of a railway from Buenos Aires to Chile.

== Births ==
- date unknown - Ángel de Estrada, poet and novelist (died 1923)

== Deaths ==
- June 22 - Rudecindo Alvarado, military leader (born 1792)
