= 1934 in Argentina =

- Decades: 1910s; 1920s; 1930s; 1940s; 1950s
- See also: Other events of 1934; List of years in Argentina

Events in the year 1934 in Argentina.

== Incumbents ==
- President: Agustín Pedro Justo
- Vice President: Julio Argentino Pascual Roca

=== Governors ===
- Buenos Aires Province: none
- Mendoza Province: Ricardo Videla

=== Vice Governors ===
- Buenos Aires Province: vacant

== Events ==
- March 4 - Argentine legislative election, 1934
- April 4 - establishment of Alumni de Villa María
- June 24 - establishment of Centro Social y Recreativo Español
- creation of Libertador General San Martín Department, Chaco

== Births ==
- 3 July – Aurora del Mar, actress (d. 2022)

== Deaths ==
=== April ===
- April 10 - Cecilia Grierson, reformer, nurse, and feminist (born 1859)

=== September ===
- September 20 - Victor Mercante, educator (born 1870)

== Films ==
- Ayer y Hoy (film), directed by Enrique Telémaco Susini
- En la tierra del Guarán, directed by Lumiton
- Galería de esperanzas, directed by Carlos de la Púa
- Ídolos de la radio, directed by Eduardo Morera
- Riachuelo, directed by Luis José Moglia Barth

== See also ==
- List of Argentine films of 1934
