= 1865 in Argentina =

- Decades: 1840s; 1850s; 1860s; 1870s; 1880s
- See also: Other events of 1865; List of years in Argentina

Events in the year 1865 in Argentina.

== Incumbents ==
- President: Bartolomé Mitre
- Vice President: Marcos Paz

=== Governors ===
- Buenos Aires Province: Mariano Saavedra
- Mendoza Province: Carlos González
- Santa Fe Province: Patricio Cullen then Nicasio Oroño

=== Vice Governors ===
- Buenos Aires Province: vacant

== Events ==
- March 5 – establishment of Bragado Partido
- May 1 – Treaty of the Triple Alliance
- July 9 – establishment of Nueve de Julio Partido
- July 19 – establishment of Ayacucho Partido, General Lavalle Partido, Necochea Partido, Tapalqué Partido, Tordillo Partido and Lincoln Partido
- August 5 – establishment of Chacabuco Partido

== Births ==
- April 26 – Luis Dellepiane, civil engineer, militarist and politician
