= Argerich =

Argerich is a surname of Catalan origin. It may refer to:

- Cosme Argerich (1758–1820), Surgeon General in the Argentine Revolutionary Army of the Andes
- Juan Argerich (1862–1924), Argentine statesman
- Manuel Argerich (1851–1875), Argentine politician, writer, and medical doctor
- Martha Argerich (born 1941), Argentine concert pianist
