= 1875 in Argentina =

- Decades: 1850s; 1860s; 1870s; 1880s; 1890s
- See also: Other events of 1875; List of years in Argentina

Events in the year 1875 in Argentina.

== Incumbents ==
- President: Nicolás Avellaneda
- Vice President: Mariano Acosta

=== Governors ===
- Buenos Aires Province: Álvaro Barros (until 1 May); Carlos Casares (from 1 May)
- Cordoba: Enrique Rodríguez
- Mendoza Province: Francisco Civit
- Santa Fe Province: Servando Bayo

=== Vice Governors ===
- Buenos Aires Province: vacant (until 1 May); Luis Sáenz Peña (starting 1 May)

== Events ==
- March 9 - The settlement of Deán Funes, Córdoba, is founded, when the Deán Funes, Córdoba when the Ferrocarril Central Norte (railway) from Córdoba reaches the area.
- September 29 - The Casa de Moneda de la República Argentina is inaugurated, under Law 733 of 1875 which ordered the creation of two mints, one in Buenos Aires and another in Salta.

== Births ==
- February 17 - Rómulo Sebastián Naón, lawyer, politician and diplomat, Ambassador to the United States 1910-1919 (died 1941)
- February 27 - Manuel Ugarte, author, writer and member of the Socialist Party (died 1951)

== Deaths ==
- June 30 - Dalmacio Vélez Sársfield, lawyer and politician (born 1800)
- November 17 - Hilario Ascasubi, poet (born 1807)
