= 1867 in Argentina =

- Decades: 1840s; 1850s; 1860s; 1870s; 1880s
- See also: Other events of 1867; List of years in Argentina

Events in the year 1867 in Argentina.

== Incumbents ==
- President: Bartolomé Mitre
- Vice President: Marcos Paz

=== Governors ===
- Buenos Aires Province: Adolfo Alsina
- Mendoza Province:
  - until 11 April: Carlos Juan Rodríguez
  - 11 April-11 July: Nicolás Villanueva
  - 11 July-16 October: Ezequiel García
  - starting 16 October: Nicolás Villanueva
- Santa Fe Province: Nicasio Oroño

=== Vice Governors ===
- Buenos Aires Province: vacant

== Events ==
- 27 March – founding of the Club Atlético del Rosario
- 9 May – British immigrants Thomas and James Hogg found the Buenos Aires Football Club, effectively marking the beginning of the sport in Argentina.
- 8 July – Paraguayan War: Staff Sergeant Roberto A. Chodasiewicz uses an observation balloon during the battle of Humaitá.
- 31 October – establishment of the Benito Juárez Partido
- 15 November
  - La Capital is founded in Rosario, the oldest Argentine newspaper still in circulation.
  - Ferrocarril Andino, the first state-owned railway in Argentina, is founded.
- 25 November – establishment of the Olavarría Partido

== Births ==
- 6 January – Pelagio Luna, politician (died 1919)
- 8 March – Gregorio de Laferrère, politician and playwright (died 1913)
- 19 April – Elvira Rawson de Dellepiane, first woman in Argentina to obtain a medical degree and "the mother of women's rights in Argentina" (died 1954)

== Deaths ==
- 2 June – Pascual Echagüe, soldier and politician (born 1797)
- 5 November – Santiago Derqui
