= 1864 in Argentina =

- Decades: 1840s; 1850s; 1860s; 1870s; 1880s
- See also: Other events of 1864; List of years in Argentina

Events in the year 1864 in Argentina.

== Incumbents ==
- President: Bartolomé Mitre
- Vice President: Marcos Paz

=== Governors ===
- Buenos Aires Province: Mariano Saavedra
- Cordoba: Roque Ferreyra (starting month unknown)
- Mendoza Province: Carlos González
- Santa Fe Province: Patricio Cullen

=== Vice Governors ===
- Buenos Aires Province: vacant

== Events ==
- 10 August – Uruguayan War: War breaks out between Brazil and Uruguay, despite negotiations involving Argentine Foreign Minister Rufino de Elizalde.
- 25 October – establishment of General Las Heras Partido
- 13 December – Paraguayan War: Paraguay declares war on Brazil; war with Argentina follows three months later.
- The classic aperitif Hesperidina is invented by American immigrant Melville Sewell Bagley in Buenos Aires.

== Deaths ==
- 30 October – Jonas Coe ("Comodoro Juan Coe"), US naval commander and supporter of Juan Manuel de Rosas (born 1805).
