= Ramona Medina =

Argentine activist (1977–2020)

- Born: 22 June 1977; Tucumán Province, Argentina
- Died: 17 May 2020 (aged 42); Buenos Aires, Argentina
- Occupation: Activist

Ramona Medina (22 June 1977 – 17 May 2020) was an Argentine feminist activist from the village group La Poderosa of Villa 31, located in Buenos Aires, Argentina. She lived in very precarious conditions with her family, in one of the most important agglomerations of the capital city. In May 2020, she died of COVID-19 after a short hospitalization at the Hospital Muñiz in Buenos Aires.

== Activism ==
As a reference and activist in her neighborhood, in addition to cooperating in the dining room, Medina was the Health Coordinator of the Casa de la Mujer in Villa 31. At the beginning of the COVID-19 pandemic in Buenos Aires, Medina gained relevance in the media of mass communication due to the complaint of the lack of water in their neighborhood, which prevented them from maintaining basic hygiene care to avoid the spread of COVID-19.

== Consequences of poverty ==
Ramona was an insulin-dependent diabetic, a comorbidity that included her in the risk group for the pandemic. In May 2020, she was infected with the SARS-CoV-2 virus. After being admitted to the Hospital Muñiz, she died on 17 May 2020 at age 42.

After her death, numerous political groups and social movements demonstrated to denounce the serious state of neglect in which millions of people live throughout the country, conditions aggravated by the pandemic. Originating from these claims, in June 2020, a bill was presented in the Argentine Chamber of Deputies called "Ramona's Law" in recognition of the workers of picnic areas and community kitchens during the health emergency due to the COVID-19 pandemic. The law established the payment of an allowance recognition of a non-remunerative nature consisting of the payment of 5,000 Argentine pesos per month, extending as long as the public health emergency is in force in the country. This initiative became operational in December 2020.

== Tributes ==
As a tribute, the health brigades of the Faculty of Exact Sciences of the National University of La Plata bear the name "Ramona Medina". The brigades are made up of more than 450 students, teachers, non-teachers and professionals graduated from the Faculty and their mission is to vaccinate, make alcohol and chinstraps, among other sanitary actions.

One year after her death, the British musician Roger Waters remembered her as "one of our heroines".
