= 1869 in Argentina =

- Decades: 1840s; 1850s; 1860s; 1870s; 1880s
- See also: Other events of 1869; List of years in Argentina

Events in the year 1869 in Argentina.

== Incumbents ==
- President: Domingo Faustino Sarmiento
- Vice President: Adolfo Alsina

=== Governors ===
- Buenos Aires Province: Emilio de Castro y Rocha
- Cordoba: Félix de la Peña
- Mendoza Province: Nicolás Villanueva
- Santa Fe Province: Mariano Cabal

=== Vice Governors ===
- Buenos Aires Province: vacant

== Deaths ==
- September 6 – Valentín Alsina
