= 1866 in Argentina =

- Decades: 1840s; 1850s; 1860s; 1870s; 1880s
- See also: Other events of 1866; List of years in Argentina

Events in the year 1866 in Argentina.

== Incumbents ==
- President: Bartolomé Mitre
- Vice President: Marcos Paz

=== Governors ===
- Buenos Aires Province: Mariano Saavedra (until 1 May), Adolfo Alsina (starting 1 May)
- Mendoza Province:
  - until 1 November: Carlos González
  - 1 November-11 November: Melitón Arroyo
  - starting 11 November: Carlos Juan Rodríguez
- Santa Fe Province: Nicasio Oroño

=== Vice Governors ===
- Buenos Aires Province: vacant

== Events ==
- January 31 – Paraguayan War: The Battle of Pehuajó takes place when about 1500 Paraguayan troops, commanded by General Francisco Isidoro Resquín and Lieutenant Celestino Prieto, engage in a surprise attack Argentinian and Uruguayan battalions with around 2000 men, led by General Emilio Conesa; the Paraguayans are successful and the joint Argentine-Uruguayan force suffers heavy casualties.
- May 24 – Paraguayan War: First Battle of Tuyutí is an allied victory.
- July 18 – Battle of Boquerón (1866)
- September 1–3 – Battle of Curuzú
- September 22 – Battle of Curupayty

== Deaths ==
- February 15 – Juan Gregorio de las Heras, military leader (born 1780)
