= 1802 in Argentina =

- Decades: 1780s; 1790s; 1800s; 1810s; 1820s
- See also: Other events in 1802; List of years in Argentina

In 1802, the territory that would later become Argentina was part of the Viceroyalty of the Río de la Plata, part of the Spanish Empire.

== Births ==
- Valentín Alsina, lawyer and politician (d. 1869)
