= Patricio Cullen =

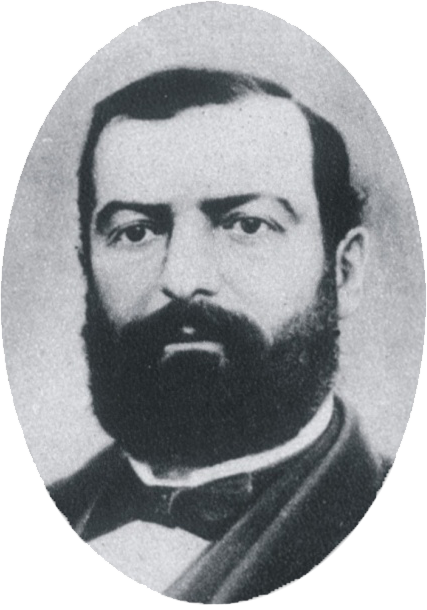
Patricio Cullen

Patricio Cullen (1826–1877) was the governor of province of Santa Fe, Argentina between 1862 and 1865. He was the second son of Domingo Cullen and Joaquina Rodríguez del Fresno.

Cullen was born in the provincial capital Santa Fe. His family was of Irish origin (descended from Thomas Cullen Maher, who emigrated from Kilkenny to the Canary Islands in 1793), and has given Santa Fe many influential characters in the field of politics (Domingo Cullen was governor of Santa Fe, as was Patricio's brother José María). Many of their descendants were part of powerful local families (for example, Patricio's sister Joaquina was the wife of governor Nicasio Oroño).

In 1850 Patricio Cullen married Elena Iturraspe. They had two daughters, Elena and Dominga, both of whom were later married to provincial governors (Mariano Cabal and José Bernardo Iturraspe).

Cullen was the first constitutional governor of Santa Fe, elected under the provincial constitution dictated in 1856, three years after the National Constitution of 1853. He belonged to the progressive Liberal faction, along with his brother-in-law Nicasio Oroño (who succeeded him), and opposed to the Autonomist faction led by Simón de Iriondo.

The Autonomists ousted Nicasio Oroño in 1867. Around 1877, popular discontent with the government of Servando Bayo led Oroño (then a national senator) to plot an uprising to regain power, counting with the support of the population of the immigrant colonies. Cullen led the rebellion in the north, gathering forces and taking control of several towns on his way to the provincial capital. His second-in-command, Francisco Iturraspe, went before him and attempted to cross the Saladillo Stream from the west, across the pass of Los Cachos, but he was repelled and badly wounded. Cullen went to help, but he faced superior forces and had to flee. He was followed north and killed near the town of Santa Rosa (Garay Department), on 20 March 1877. His body was then taken south to the capital, where the provincial government officially deplored his death and gave him the honours corresponding to his rank. Cullen's remains are now buried in the Convent of Saint Dominic in Santa Fe City, next to those of his father and other prominent leaders of the province.

Preceded by Pascual Rosas	Governor of Santa Fe; 1862–1865	Succeeded by Nicasio Oroño
