= Francisco Javier Muñiz =

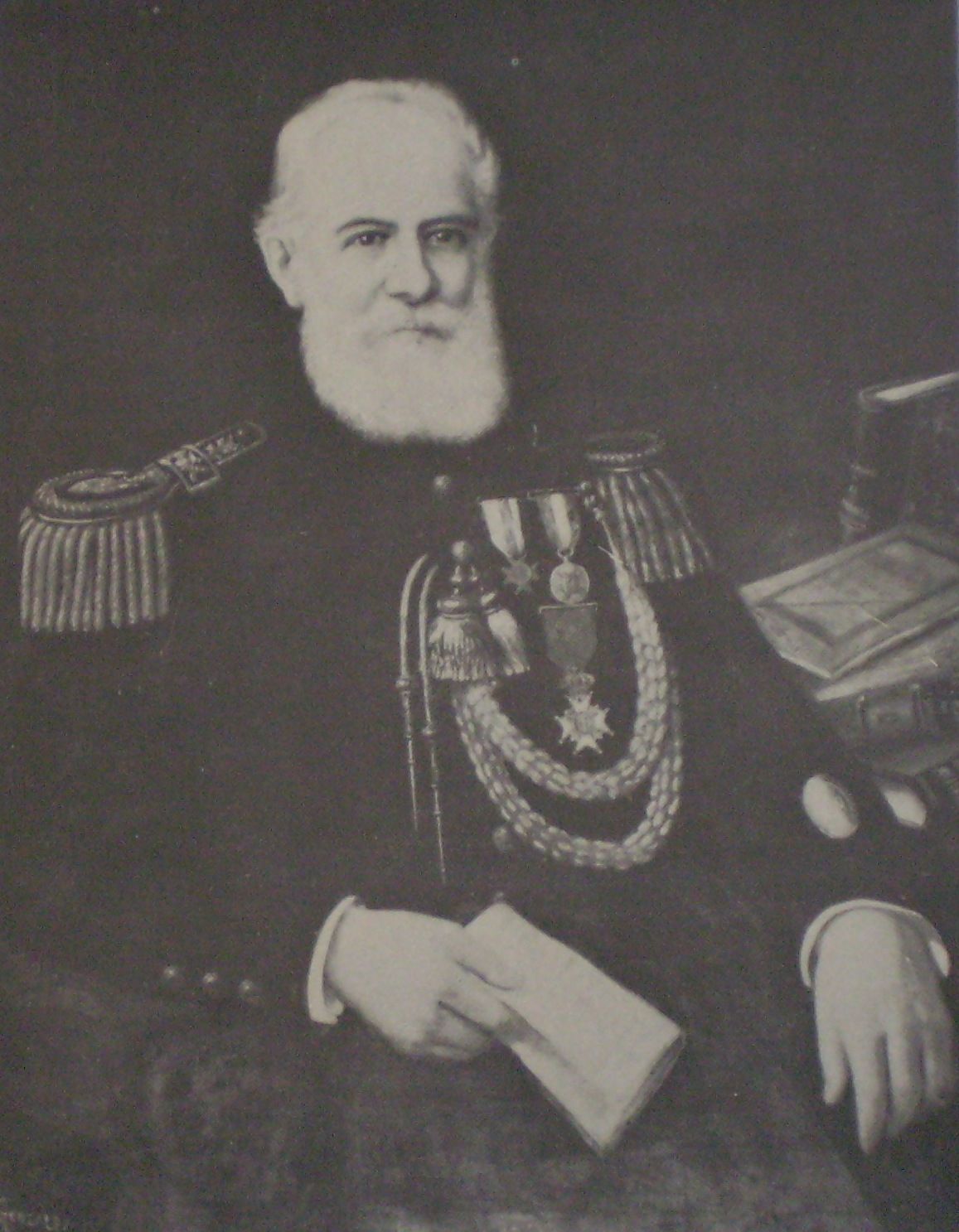
- Francisco Javier Muñiz
- Born: 21 December 1795; San Isidro, Argentina
- Died: 8 April 1871 (aged 75); Buenos Aires, Argentina
- Cause of death: Yellow fever
- Resting place: Cementerio de la Recoleta, Buenos Aires, Argentina; 34°35′15.07″S 58°23′36.74″W
- Known for: Indigenous vaccine, physician

Francisco Javier Muñiz (21 December 1795 – 8 April 1871) was an Argentine colonel, legislator, and medical doctor. He treated patients and died during the Great Yellow Fever Epidemic of 1871. He was considered the first important naturalist from Argentina.

== Personal life ==
Francisco Javier Muñiz was born in San Isidro, Buenos Aires Province, Argentina on 21 December 1795.

== Early military service and medical school ==
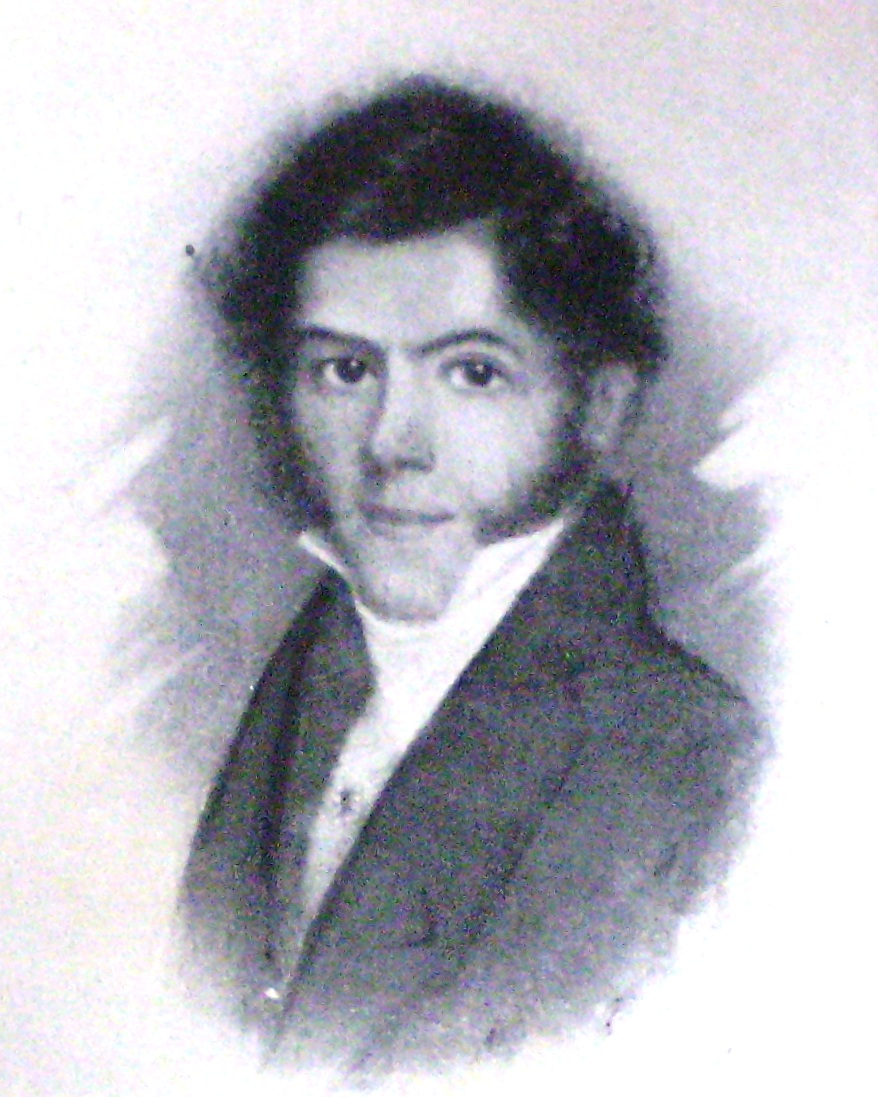
Diego Abad de Santillán, Francisco Muñiz

He studied at the Instituto Médico Militar (Military Medical Institute) beginning in 1814. The institute was founded by Dr. Cosme Argerich to train surgeons for the army. Muñiz graduated as a doctor in 1821 He transferred to the University of Buenos Aires and completed his surgical education in 1824. Muñiz obtained his doctorate in 1844; his dissertation was about the vaccination of indigenous peoples against smallpox. This work made him notable among European scientists. His dissertation followed the article, "A Case of Extensive Scabby Ulcerations, Cured by Vaccination" that he wrote and was published in the London Medical and Surgical Journal in 1833.

== Career ==
=== Medicine ===
Muñiz, upon becoming a doctor in 1821, worked as a military doctor under Juan Lavalle at Carmen de Patagones during the campaign to secure land from indigenous people. He began to study the customs of native people at this time. In 1824 he was transferred to the fort at Chascomús, and began his study of paleontology. General Carlos María de Alvear ordered that he accompany Lavalle and his troops during the 1826 war with Brazil. He was promoted to Army Surgeon Major that year and transferred to Luján in 1828 to be a physician to police and military troops.

Muñiz served the military and became a colonel. During the Paraguayan War, he became director of Corrientes Province area hospitals.

In 1848, Muñiz moved to Buenos Aires to become a professor of the School of Medicine where he taught in the fields of forensic medicine, gynecology and obstetrics. He was dean, or president, of a Buenos Aires medical faculty.

=== Paleontology ===
Muñiz was a paleontologist, particularly interested in variances among fossils. Working as a physician at Lujan was of particular paleontological interest because of a famous find in 1788 of the Megatherium, an immense ground sloth. He developed a collection that he intended to be used to create a natural history museum. The artifacts were sent (donated or possibly donated by force) to Juan Manuel de Rosas, the dictator of the Argentine Federation, whose support was required to establish a museum. Rosas, in an attempt to build alliances overseas, sent collected fossils to Jean Henri Dupotet, Rear Admiral of the French Navy. Dupotet then sent them to Paris. In France Muñiz collection ended up in the National Museum of Natural History where they were studied by Paul Gervais.

Apuntes Toggraficos, published in 1847 by Muñiz, contained his topographical notes that discussed the study of fossils in the relative ages of sedimentary strata in areas south of the Buenos Aires Province by naturalists, including Charles Darwin. Darwin began corresponding with Muñiz after reading his work on ñata cattle, indicative of the reputation that he was gaining as a naturalist. Domingo Sarmiento, who researched Muñiz's papers, commented on his influence to Darwin's theory of the origin of species.

This inquiry into the existence and later extinction of a variety of cattle raised on the ranches of Buenos Aires would be of little intellectual interest today, were it not thus linked with the celebrated theory of evolution, and the appears of Dr. Muñiz would be of lesser interest, too, except for the observations cited by Darwin in the Journal of Researches (commonly known as The Voyage of the Beagle). (Note: Darwin wrote: "A niata bull with a common cow, or the reverse cross, produces offspring having an intermediate character, but with the niata characters strongly displayed: according to Senor Muñiz, there is the clearest evidence, contrary to the common believe of agriculturalists in analogous cases, that the niata cow when crossed with a common bull transmits her peculiarities more strongly than the niata bull when crossed with a common cow.")

— Domingo Sarmiento

He described a sabertooth, which he named Muni-felus Bonaerensis, in Gaceta Mercantil in 1845. He sent his description to Darwin on 30 August 1846 for his comments. Darwin encouraged him to send specimens to France, which were received in Paris, apparently sent by Rosas. It was determined to be a Smilodon bonaerensis.

In their book, From Man to Ape: Darwinism in Argentina, Novoa and Levine identify Muniz as the first important naturalist from Argentina, who donated his later collection of fossils to the Museum of Buenos Aires.

=== Politics ===
He was a legislator, elected first as a representative and then a senator.

== Death ==
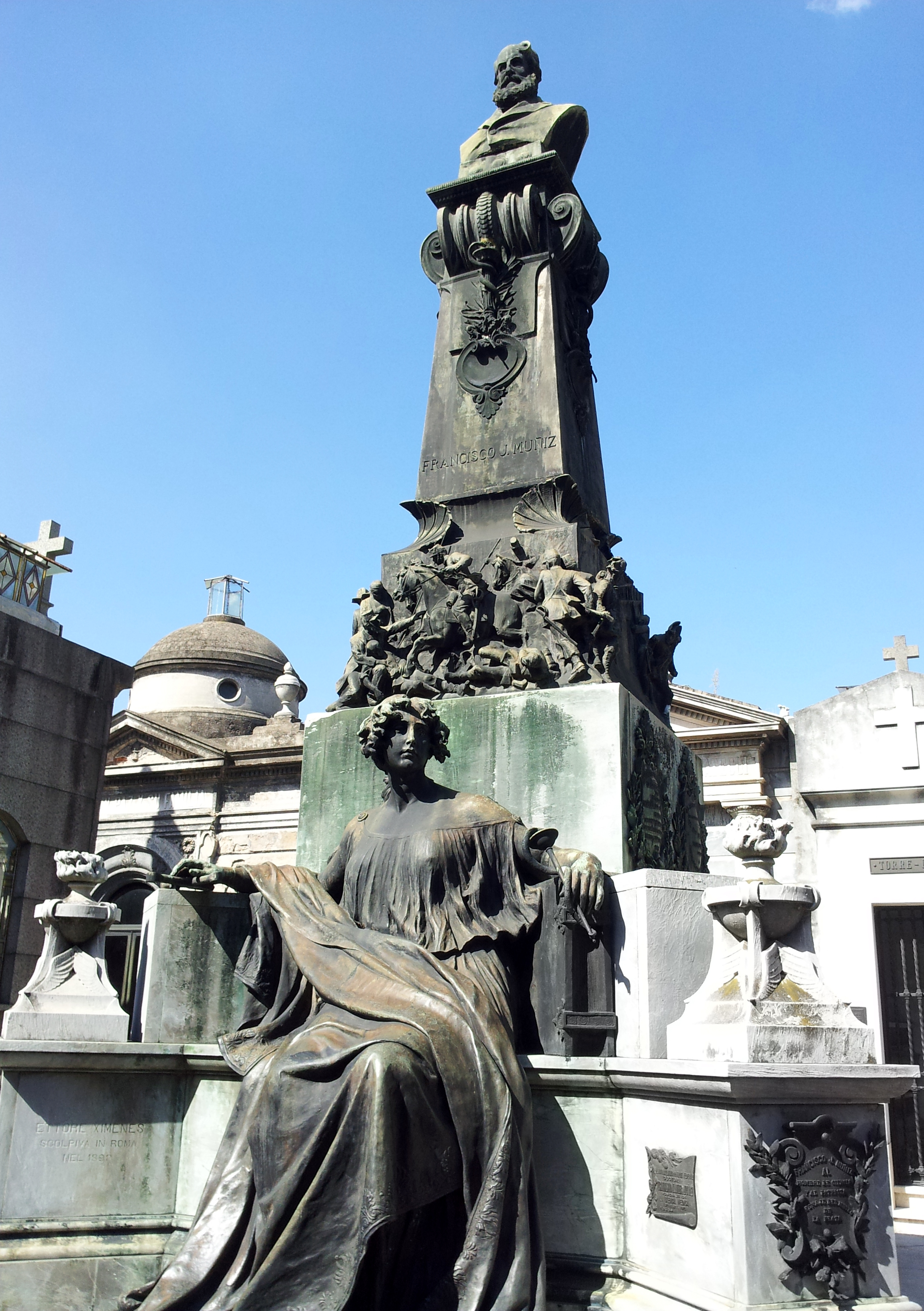
Monument to Francisco Javier Muñiz, Cementerio de la Recoleta, Buenos Aires

After having treated people with yellow fever during the great Buenos Aires epidemic, Muñiz succumbed to the illness and died on 8 April 1871. He was buried in the Cementerio de la Recoleta in Buenos Aires, Argentina. A monument was created in his honor by the city of Buenos Aires.

== Legacy ==
- Of his importance to Argentina, President Sarmiento wrote:

His profession was medicine and surgery; but at the University, he introduced and taught classes in obstetrics and pediatric pathology, exhibiting the highest feelings of respect for women, respect that in other countries had already led to calls for the civil equity of the sexes, and will soon lead also to political suffrage. Muñiz led the way along this path. In the army, he introduced vegetable rations and militated for mobile hospitals, such as now become the order of the day in all modern armies. In the natural sciences he followed in Darwin's footsteps, continuing his work and collecting the materials that Burmeister, with his greater technical skill, would later classify.

— Domingo Sarmiento

- The Museo de Historia Natural "Francisco Javier Muñiz" de Moreno was inaugurated in Moreno Partido in 1999 in his honor.
- In a series commemorating scientists, Argentina issued a stamp with a portrait of Francisco Javier Muñiz in 1966.
- Hospital Muñiz, the oldest Infectious Diseases Hospital in Latin America, is named in his honor.
