= Domingo Cullen =

Argentine politician (1791–1839)

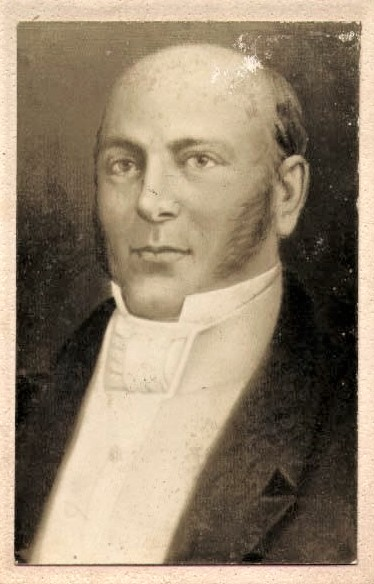

Personal details
- Born: 1791 Canary Islands, Spain
- Died: 1839 (aged 47–48) Buenos Aires Province, Argentina
- Party: Federalist
- Occupation: Politician
- Profession: Accountant

Domingo Cullen (1791 – 21 June 1839) was the governor of province of Santa Fe, Argentina during 1838.

== Biography ==
Cullen was born in Tenerife, Canary Islands, but moved to Argentina in the 1820s after establishing commercial activities (linked with fluvial trade) in the area. He met Santa Fe's caudillo Estanislao López when serving as a deputy of the Cabildo of Montevideo. After being involved in activism related to the independence of Uruguay and the resistance against Brazil (see Cisplatine War), he returned to Santa Fe, settled in a ranch, and married Joaquina Rodríguez del Fresno, the young widow of Pedro Aldao and sister-in-law of López. In 1828 he became a counselor of López, and his Minister of Government in 1833.

At the time of López's death on 15 June 1838, Cullen was in Buenos Aires as representative of Santa Fe, trying to find a peaceful solution to the ongoing French blockade of the port (caused by a law of 1821 that obligated resident foreign citizens of the province of Buenos Aires to serve in conscription). Cullen argued that the blockade was the result of a provincial law and therefore the other provinces were not bound to help Buenos Aires. Juan Manuel de Rosas, the powerful governor of Buenos Aires, contended that this violated the Federal Pact.

When Cullen returned to Santa Fe, he became governor, but his election was not acknowledged by Rosas and by Pascual Echagüe, governor of the neighbouring Entre Ríos Province. Without López's support, he faced opposition from his personal enemies in the province and from those loyals to Rosas. In the end, all provinces including Santa Fe ended up supporting Buenos Aires against the French, and Cullen was forced to resign and go to exile.

Accused of conspiring with the Unitarians (enemies of Rosas) and the French, he sought asylum in Santiago del Estero, but he was betrayed by his host and delivered to Rosas's men, to be tried in Buenos Aires. However, right after crossing the Arroyo del Medio and entering the territory of Buenos Aires Province, his captors announced they had orders to kill him. Cullen was assisted by a priest in San Nicolás de los Arroyos and wrote a letter to his wife; he was then killed by a firing squad, on 21 June 1839. He was buried in the spot.

In 1840 the army of General Juan Lavalle passed by the place on its way to Santa Fe, and Cullen's body was exhumed at the request of Pedro Rodríguez del Fresno, an officer of Lavalle's and Cullen's brother-in-law. He was taken to the Convent of Saint Dominic in Santa Fe, where they remain today, next to the bodies of his son Patricio and several other important leaders.

== Descent ==
Cullen's family was of Irish origin, descended from Thomas Cullen Maher, who emigrated from Kilkenny to the Canary Islands in 1793. Domingo Cullen (full name: Domingo Alejandro Lorenzo Cullen y Ferraz), born in Tenerife, was Cullen Maher's third grandson, the son of Guillermo Felipe Cullen and Ángela Isidra Ferraz de la Guardia.

Cullen emigrated to the Río de la Plata region, first settling in Montevideo, Uruguay, in 1811, and moving then to Santa Fe in 1823. This Argentine branch of the family has given Santa Fe many influential characters in the field of politics.

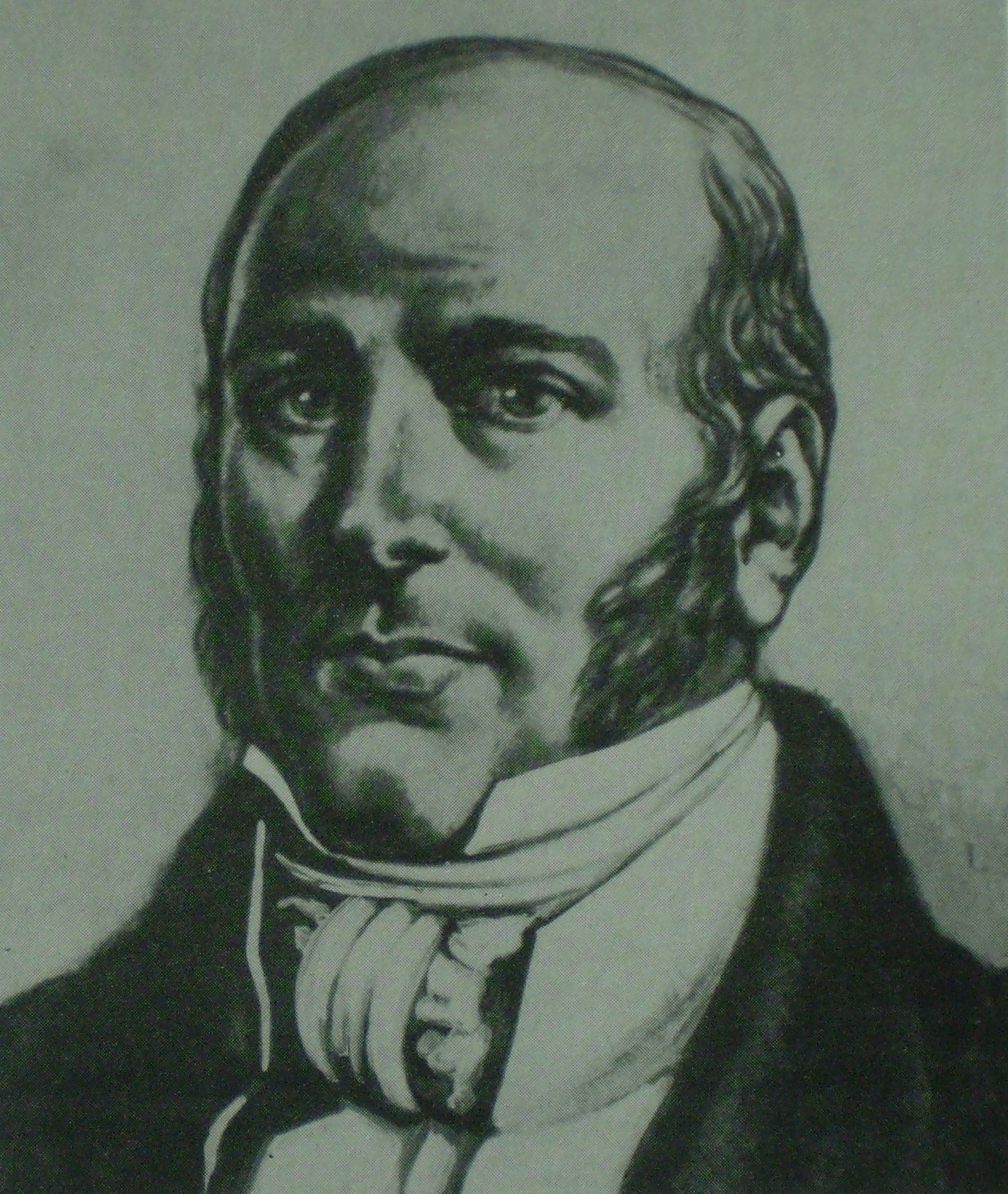
Domingo Cullen, as depicted by J. Zorrila de San Martín

Cullen had seven children. José María Cullen, his firstborn, and Patricio Cullen, his second son, both served as governors of Santa Fe (Tomás Cullen, his youngest son, was also ad interim governor). His third child, Joaquina, was the wife of Nicasio Oroño, governor and political chief of Rosario, and the fourth, Josefa, was married to Juan María Gutiérrez Granados, member of the Constitutional Assembly that crafted the Argentine Constitution of 1853.

Preceded by Estanislao López	Governor of Santa Fe; 1838	Succeeded by Juan Pablo López
