= 1801 in Argentina =

- Decades: 1780s; 1790s; 1800s; 1810s; 1820s
- See also: Other events in 1801; List of years in Argentina

In 1801, the territory that would later become Argentina was part of the Viceroyalty of the Río de la Plata, part of the Spanish Empire.

== Births ==
- October 18 - Justo José de Urquiza – general and politician (d. 1870)
