= 1800 in Argentina =

- Decades: 1800s; 1810s; 1820s
- See also: Other events of 1800; List of years in Argentina

In 1800, the territory that would later become Argentina was part of the Viceroyalty of the Río de la Plata, part of the Spanish Empire.

== Events ==
- In 1800, Argentina was performing well economically, slightly wealthier than the United States and Cuba.
- The Argentine Army, suspicious of invasion, increases its force to 14,141 soldiers.

== Births ==
- Dalmacio Vélez Sársfield (February 18, 1800 – June 30, 1875) – lawyer
