= Manuel Argerich =

Manuel Gregorio Argerich or Manuel Argerich (1835–1871) was an Argentine philosopher, author, lawyer, politician, mathematician and medical doctor.

== Personal life ==
Manuel Gregorio Argerich was born in Buenos Aires in 1835. His brother, Juan Antonio, was born in 1840 and was, like Manuel, a key figure during the cholera and yellow fever epidemics. He helped organize the commission to organize a plan to manage the epidemic with José Roque Pérez. He was a professor of surgery and director of an orphan's home. They were descendants of Dr. Cosme Argerich.

Argerich married and had children. José Manuel Estrada, a friend and writer said of his home life: "He requested his family to act as a clear and transparent sky, under which to calm his violent temper; he loved his young wife passionately, the only person under whose refuge he found peace and a tranquil candor - the soft love and holy happiness that his troubled soul needed. His love for his children was intense, incorporating the imagination of youth and the discretion of providence."

He was a member of the Buenos Aires Freemasons lodge.

== Medical career ==
=== Battle of Caseros ===
As medical doctor, he was conscripted as a medical officer into the army] under the command of Argentine caudillo Juan Manuel de Rosas, then governor of Buenos Aires. He cared for the wounded and injured soldiers during the Battle of Caseros in which Rosas' authoritarian regime was finally defeated. Following the battle, which led to flight of Rosas to Great Britain, Argerich was documented to have stayed in the field voluntarily after Rosas' defeat, treating not only wounded soldiers and fellow officers formerly under Rosas' command, but also Urquiza's soldiers stricken by smallpox, with complete indifference as to which uniform his patients wore.

=== Buenos Aires Epidemics ===
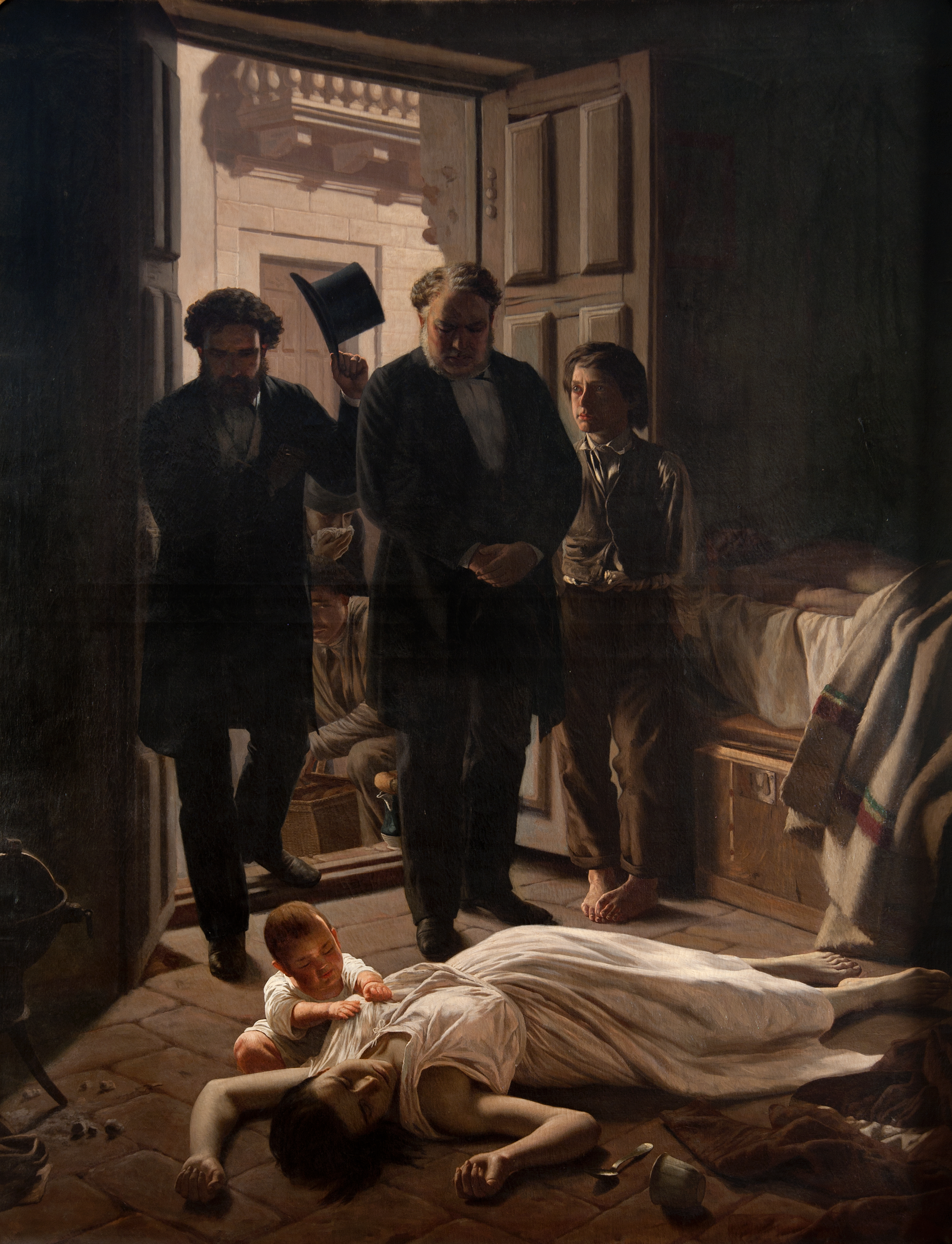
Juan Manuel Blanes, Episodio de la fiebre amarilla, 1871, was made as a tribute to Dr. Manuel Argerich.

A year after Urquiza was assassinated, Argerich treated the victims of Buenos Aires' epidemics of Cholera in 1867 and Yellow Fever in 1871. Argerich was identified as one of the "ministering angels" who was not part of the mass exodus from the city, but stayed behind at his peril to tend to the sick who remained in Buenos Aires. He is depicted treating a patient alongside Dr. Roque Perez in Juan Manuel Blanes' iconic 1871 portrait, Yellow Fever of the great Buenos Aires epidemic of 1871.

Although he was committed to his responsibilities as a physician, he was conflicted, he said to José Manuel Estrada 3 days before he died: "My Children! My Wife! Have I the right to defy death and risk abandoning them forever?"

== Writer ==
He is also remembered as a pioneer of the Spanish theatrical genre known as the Zarzuela. Argerich wrote the lyrics for Los Consejos de Don Javier, or The Advice of Don Javier, and was put to music in 1892 by Felice Lebano. It was first played at the Buenos Aires' Apollo Theater on September 1, 1892. In anticipation of the premier, La Nación issued a review on July 14, 1892 stating that the music by Lebano, in particular, made the work innovative, Zarzuela music. It was one of the first popular works of Zarzuela theater in Argentina.

== Death ==
During the great yellow fever epidemic of 1871, Argerich, tirelessly continued his care of the sick until finally succumbing to the disease on May 25, 1871, the 61st anniversary of the Argentine Revolution. He was one of the 13,614 victims of the Buenos Aires Yellow Fever epidemic.

Three days later, at his funeral, his contemporary Jose Manuel Estrada, Argentine writer, eulogized him, a portion of which is translated from Spanish:

In the sweet love of his home life, and in the severe labour of scientific inquiry, he searched for a moderation of his overflowing passions - which he always felt were delayed and out of harmony with the pace by which they had defined his nature in the heat of his youth.

Susceptible to all the turbulent agitations of the people, it was impossible for him to simply be indifferent to their bad fortune and desolation. This man of charity revealed himself with complete furor.

Manuel Argerich contributed to a renaissance by serving the poor - sign with which the Divine Master makes known to the people the coming of his Redemption.

— Jose Manuel Estrada

Argerich is buried in Buenos Aires at the La Chacarita Cemetery (Spanish: Cementerio de la Chacarita). His gravesite was declared a National Monument in 1970 and is a highlight of prominent graves in a tour of that cemetery.
