= Ángel de Estrada =

Argentine poet, novelist, and writer

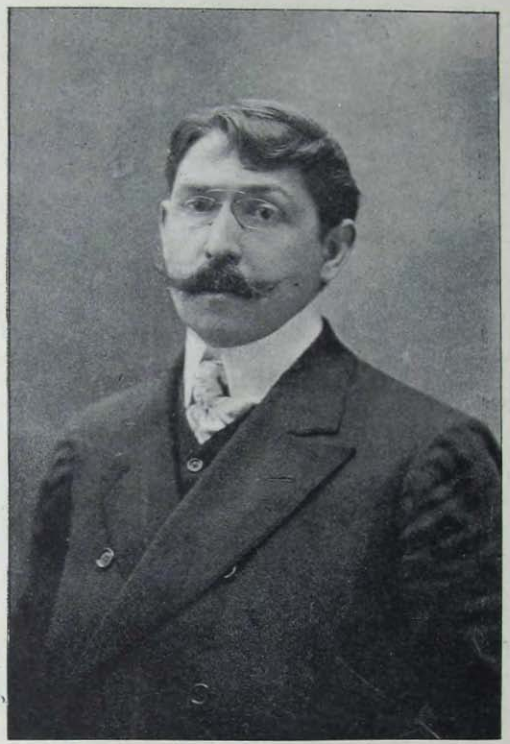
Angel Estrada

Ángel de Estrada (20 September 1872–28 December 1923) was an Argentine poet, novelist and writer. He was born in Buenos Aires, Argentina in 1872 and died at sea off Rio de Janeiro, Brazil in 1923. He was a great admirer and friend of the Nicaraguan poet Rubén Darío and with heavy influences from Italian writer Gabriele D'Annunzio.

== Family history ==
Born in Buenos Aires in 1840, the first Ángel de Estrada came from a long line of wealthy landowners and helped found the Sociedad Rural Argentina. His family connections plus large fortune helped him become a successful businessman. In 1869, he founded the publishing house, Editorial Estrada, which today forms part of the Macmillan Group. He continued similar ventures in the area of publishing, including opening the first paper factory in Argentina. De Estrada therefore provided many of the educational materials needed for the rapidly growing nation. Ángel de Estrada died in 1918. His son, of the same name, Ángel de Estrada, is well known perhaps because of the body of work left behind by his father.

== Career ==
In 1889 Ángel de Estrada (son) began his career as a poet with several essays, but his best writings are done in prose, modernist style. He was a tireless traveler who loved France and Renaissance Italy. He had a great fortune and always showed signs of being a great gentleman. In his country he taught at the National College and the Academy of Arts.

He also liked to write the chronicles of his travels and he wrote in various newspapers. He was characterized by his delicate musicality and aestheticizing spirit, plus an abundance of neologisms, and a marked tendency towards attention to detail in his description of landscapes and environments.

He died at sea on the ship taking him back to Argentina from a trip to Europe, near Rio de Janeiro in 1923.

== Works ==
- El muerto armonioso (The harmonious dead)
- Alma nómada (Nomad soul)
- La esfinge (The Sphinx)
- Calidoscopio (Kaleidoscope)
- Cervantes y el Quijote (Cervantes and Don Quixote)
- La señora (The lady)
- Los espejos (The mirrors)
- El triunfo de las rosas (The triumph of the roses)
- El Color de la piedra (The color of the stone)
