= Ayer y Hoy (film) =

Ayer y hoy
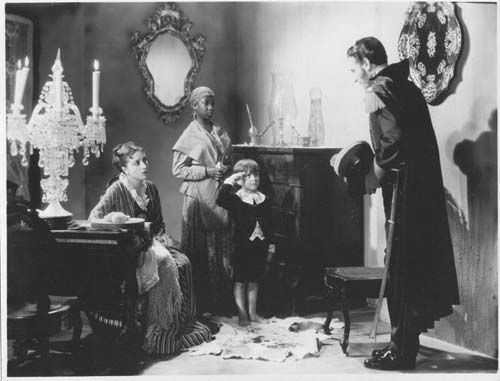
- Directed by: Enrique Susini
- Written by: José B. Cairola
- Starring: Iván Caseros; Mario Danesi
- Release date: 25 May 1934
- Country: Argentina
- Language: Spanish

Ayer y hoy (English language:Yesterday and Today) is a 1934 Argentine musical romantic drama film directed by Enrique Susini and written by José B. Cairola. The film premiered on 25 May 1934 in Buenos Aires, during the Golden Age of Argentine cinema.

It is a tango film, based on an integral part of Argentine culture.

== Overview ==
The plot is divided into two time-periods: 1840 to 1852 and 1914 to 1934. The first part of history passes during the government of Juan Manuel de Rosas and refers to the history of love of a woman and a young Unitarian, who is ruined when she is forced to marry a rich federal. A daughter was born, a product of that disastrous marriage. The woman died in 1852, convinced of the love that she professed to him, the one who fought next to Urquiza in the battle of Caseros.

In the second part of the history they are the descendants of those persons who face similar circumstances. There is another failed marriage, that of the granddaughter of the aforementioned woman, with a man who leaves the union quickly. After his departure, she sets out to remake her life. Soon she will need to make a decision when facing her ex-husband, when she is in a situation another man. Finally released, she will be able to marry the man that she truly loves.

== Main cast ==
- Iván Caseros
- Mario Danesi
- Victoria Garabato
- Miguel Faust Rocha
- José Rondinella
- Alicia Vignoli
