= 1934 Argentine legislative election =

- 4 March 1934
- 81 of the 158 seats in the Chamber of Deputies
- Turnout: 65.70%
Party	Vote %	Seats	+/–
Concordancia	54.50	47	−3
Socialist Party	19.28	21	+1
Democratic Progressive Party	7.30	6	0
Entre Ríos UCRA	3.77	3	+1
Tucumán Radical Civic Union	3.22	2	New
Federal Lencinist UCR	0.86	1	New
Traditionalist Radical Civic Union	0.59	1	New
This lists parties that won seats. See the complete results below.
Results by province

Legislative elections were held in Argentina on 4 March 1934. The National Democratic Party remained the largest faction, with 63 of the 158 seats. Voter turnout was 66%.

== Results ==
Party or alliance		Votes	%	Seats	
Party or alliance		Votes	%	Won	Total
Concordancia	National Democratic Party	430,428	30.82	29	63
Concordancia	Santa Fe Radical Civic Union	92,927	6.65	3	6
Concordancia	Concordancia	58,950	4.22	7	—
Concordancia	Unified Radical Civic Union	35,864	2.57	2	4
Concordancia	Antipersonalist Radical Civic Union (Talcahuano)	32,081	2.30	0	0
Concordancia	Antipersonalist Radical Civic Union	30,988	2.22	2	3
Concordancia	Antipersonalist Radical Civic Union (Avenida de Mayo)	26,767	1.92	0	0
Concordancia	Liberal Party of Corrientes	24,072	1.72	1	4
Concordancia	People's Party	10,403	0.74	2	2
Concordancia	Provincial Defence–White Flag	10,159	0.73	0	1
Concordancia	Blockist Radical Civic Union	7,859	0.56	1	1
Concordancia	Independent Socialist Party	518	0.04	0	6
Concordancia	Total	761,016	54.50	47	90
Socialist Party		269,218	19.28	21	43
Democratic Progressive Party		101,928	7.30	6	14
Entre Ríos Antipersonalist Radical Civic Union		52,653	3.77	3	7
Tucumán Radical Civic Union		44,919	3.22	2	2
Radical Civic Union (Amadista)		24,750	1.77	0	0
Labour Gathering Party		18,965	1.36	0	0
Public Health Party		17,231	1.23	0	0
Federalist Lencinist Radical Civic Union		12,032	0.86	1	1
National Agrarian Union		9,935	0.71	0	0
Popular Party		8,942	0.64	0	0
Lencinist Radical Civic Union		8,756	0.63	0	0
Anti-Government National Democratic Party		8,577	0.61	0	0
Traditionalist Radical Civic Union		8,236	0.59	1	1
Radical Civic Union (Crottista)		5,753	0.41	0	0
Radical Civic Union (Paso)		4,762	0.34	0	0
Communist Party		4,589	0.33	0	0
Blockist Radical Civic Union (Portista)		4,560	0.33	0	0
Radical Nationalist Party		1,752	0.13	0	0
Liberation Party		1,685	0.12	0	0
National Public Health		1,471	0.11	0	0
Worker and Peasant List		1,105	0.08	0	0
Radical Civic Union (Charcas)		1,095	0.08	0	0
Sports Union		1,027	0.07	0	0
Independent Railwaymen and Industrialists		797	0.06	0	0
Argentine Nationalist Party		511	0.04	0	0
Liberal Party of San Juan		36	0.00	0	0
Intransigent Regional Union		13	0.00	0	0
Other parties		6,006	0.43	0	0
Independents		14,103	1.01	0	0
Total		1,396,423	100.00	81	158
Valid votes		1,396,423	90.17		
Invalid votes		4,906	0.32		
Blank votes		147,389	9.52		
Total votes		1,548,718	100.00		
Registered voters/turnout		2,357,157	65.70		
Source: Cantón, El Litoral, El Orden

=== Results by province ===
Province	Concordance			PS			PDP			Others		
Province	Votes	%	Seats	Votes	%	Seats	Votes	%	Seats	Votes	%	Seats
Buenos Aires	178,645	61.19	14	77,457	26.53	7	—	—	—	35,835	12.27	0
Buenos Aires City	99,165	34.00	5	132,112	45.29	12	7,576	2.60	0	52,833	18.11	0
Catamarca	13,513	94.15	2	839	5.85	0	—	—	—	—	—	—
Córdoba	83,527	69.16	4	19,928	16.50	2	—	—	—	17,327	14.35	0
Corrientes	74,392	98.71	3	764	1.01	0	—	—	—	211	0.28	0
Entre Ríos	48,280	45.60	1	4,949	4.67	0	—	—	—	52,653	49.73	3
Jujuy	10,403	86.95	2	1,539	12.86	0	—	—	—	22	0.18	0
La Rioja	12,961	94.76	2	707	5.17	0	—	—	—	9	0.07	0
Mendoza	25,047	47.42	2	6,986	13.23	0	—	—	—	20,788	39.36	1
Salta	18,580	68.13	2	457	1.68	0	—	—	—	8,236	30.20	1
San Juan	23,872	70.84	3	4,168	12.37	0	1,040	3.09	0	4,620	13.71	0
Santa Fe	92,927	44.72	3	11,327	5.45	0	93,312	44.91	6	10,212	4.91	0
Santiago del Estero	49,532	72.84	3	4,365	6.42	0	—	—	—	14,103	20.74	0
Tucumán	30,172	37.16	1	3,620	4.46	0	—	—	—	47,412	58.39	2
Total	761,016	54.50	47	269,218	19.28	21	101,928	7.30	6	264,261	18.92	7
