= Hospital Muñiz =

- Autonomous City Government of Buenos Aires
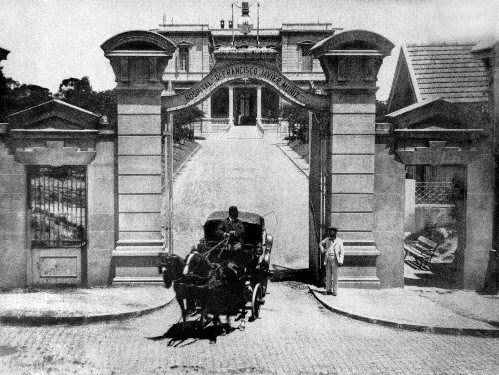
- Hospital Muñiz, ca. 1900

- Location within Buenos Aires Location within Buenos Aires Province Location within Argentina

Geography
- Location: Uspallata 2272, Buenos Aires, Buenos Aires Province, Argentina
- Coordinates: 34.637616°S 58.393627°W

Organisation
- Care system: Public
- Type: Teaching

Services
- Speciality: Infectious Diseases

History
- Founded: 1882 (Casa de Aislamiento); 1904 (Hospital Muñiz)

Links
- Website: https://www.buenosaires.gob.ar/hospitalmuniz

The Infectious Diseases Hospital “Dr. Francisco Javier Muñiz" is a public metropolitan-area hospital serving Buenos Aires, Argentina and the surrounding area since 1882. As the name implies, the hospital specializes in infectious diseases. The address for the hospital is Uspallata 2272 and is located in the neighborhood of Parque Patricios in Buenos Aires.

== History ==
The Infectious Diseases Hospital Francisco Javier Muñiz (in Spanish: Hospital de Infecciosas “Dr. Francisco Javier Muñiz") is the oldest infectious-diseases hospital in Latin America – over 100 years old. It became known as "Hospital of the pests" or the "Plague Hospital" and was preceded by the old House of Insulation, which served as a quarantine station during epidemics of cholera, yellow fever and smallpox. The new House of Insulation, built in the neighborhood of Parque Patricios ("Barracks Hospital"), was renamed in 1904 in memory of Francisco Javier Muñiz, an Argentine military doctor in the mid-nineteenth century, naturalist, paleontologist, Senator, and Dean of the Faculty of Medicine. Its technical name is "Porteño Care Centre and National Reference Regional Infectious-Contagious Disease". It receives numerous national and foreign undergraduate and postgraduate students in its Departments of Infectious Diseases and Respiratory Diseases.

== Hospital Size ==
When first opened, Hospital Muniz had more than 1,100 hospital beds; the number of beds is now about 400.

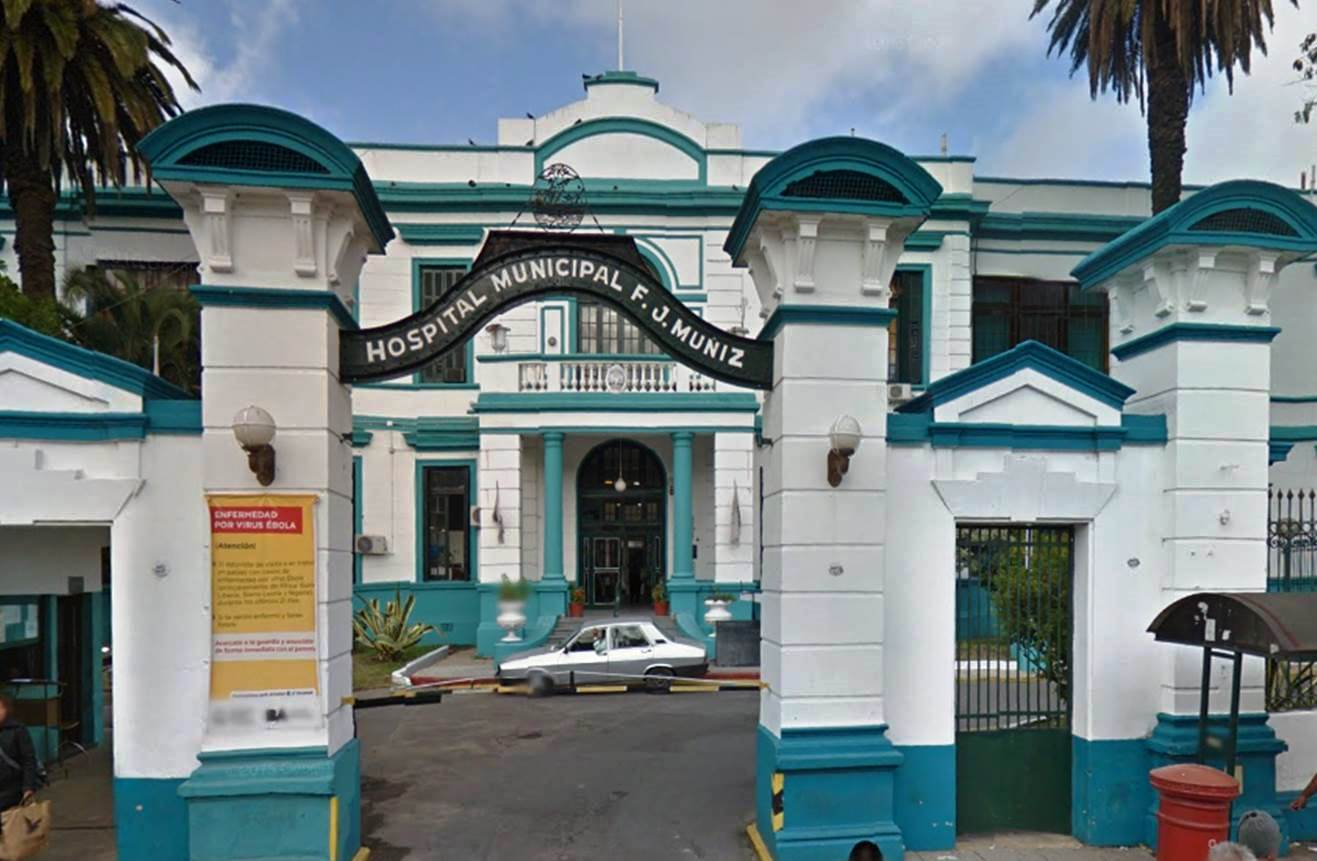
The main gate to Hospital Muñiz

== HIV ==
80% of the cases handled by this hospital are now linked to HIV and AIDS. The first case of HIV in Buenos Aires appeared in 1984 and was treated at Hospital Muñiz.

== Current Mission ==
The Hospital Muñiz is a national and regional reference hospital for infectious diseases. All infectious disease are diagnosed and treated at this hospital to include tuberculosis, pneumonia, botulism, leptospirosis, tetanus, leprosy, among others. For example, in 2007 Hospital Muniz responded to an alleged threat of anthrax, analyzing 8,000 samples.

== Patient Population ==
The majority of patients are now are treated as outpatients in the Hospital. It is believed that 80% of patients arrive from the interior parts of the country, and not from the city of Buenos Aires. The hospital built a pavilion for inmates due to the high rate of infection of the AIDS virus in the national prisons. The Hospital also has "Unit 29" whose function is to serve the children of mothers carrying the HIV virus.
