= Victor Mercante =

Víctor Mercante
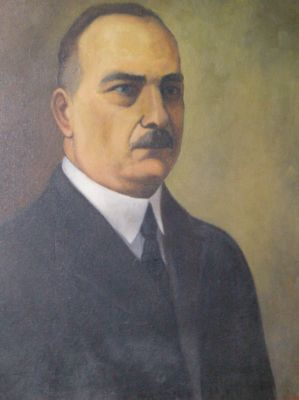
- Víctor Mercante
- Born: February 21, 1870; Merlo, Buenos Aires, Argentina
- Died: September 20, 1934 (aged 64); The Andes, in Chile

Victor Mercante (February 21, 1870 — September 20, 1934) was an Argentine educator.

Mercante was born in Merlo, in the Province of Buenos Aires. At the age of seven, his family moved back to their homeland, Italy, and he returned to Argentina in 1880. He earned a teaching degree, and started teaching in 1890 in the Province of San Juan.

He was of significant influence to the Argentine educational system, introducing scientific, secular principles of teaching.

Mercante died while crossing the Andes, in Chile.

== Works ==
- Educación comun. Mingot and Ortiz, 1897. 410 pages. Google books.
- Procedimientos: Enseñanza de la aritmética. Cabaut & Co., 1905. Google books.
- Maestros y educadores, Volumes 2. M. Gleizer, 1927. 222 pages. Google books.
- Víctor Mercante, Juan Bautista Ambrosetti. Vida and obra del doctor Florentino Ameghino: contribución a su conocimiento. Impr. Metodista, 1913. 142 pages. Google books.
- Frenos (parábola del genio): drama lírico en cuatro actos. Cabaut & Co.., 1918. 123 pages. Google books.
- La crisis de la pubertad y sus consecuencias pedagógicas. Cabaut & Co., 1918. 437 pages. Google books.
- Cultivo and desarrollo de la aptitud matemática del niño. Cabaut, 1905. 726 pages. Google books.
- Una vida realiada: mis memorias. 230 pages. Google books.
