= Servando Bayo =

Argentine politician (1822–1884)

25th Governor of Santa Fe
- In office April 7, 1874 – April 7, 1878
- Preceded by: Simón de Iriondo
- Succeeded by: Simón de Iriondo

National Senator
- In office 1881–1884
- Constituency: Santa Fe

Personal details
- Born: October 27, 1822 Rosario, Argentina
- Died: May 18, 1884 (aged 61) Buenos Aires, Argentina

Servando Bayo (October 27, 1822 – May 18, 1884) was an Argentine politician who served as the National Autonomist Party governor of the province of Santa Fe from April 7, 1874, to April 7, 1878.

A native of Rosario, Bayo attended a military training institution and took part in the Battle of Cepeda with the rank of captain. As a politician, he was Rosario's Political Chief (comparable to a non-elected mayor), a senator, and governor of the province (with Juan Manuel Zavalla as his vice-governor).

== Governership ==
Bayo is regarded as a dynamic ruler who supported progressive measures. During his governorship, he sponsored the creation of the Santa Fe Provincial Bank, to increase access to credit for the business and productive sector, while breaking the financial monopoly of the Bank of London, which the governor also deprived of the authorization to emit currency. The Bank of London retaliated against the newly created Provincial Bank by inducing bank runs to weaken it. In response, Governor Bayo ordered the liquidation of the Rosario branch of the Bank of London as harmful to the interests of the province, and arrested its manager.

Following orders of the British consul in Buenos Aires, a British ship was dispatched from Montevideo up the Paraná River to threaten the use of force against this harm to the kingdom's commercial interests. The conflict was solved in September 1876, after six months, with the mediation of the Argentine chancellor Bernardo de Irigoyen. In the ultimate outcome, the Bank of London accepted the conditions imposed by Santa Fe's government. Bayo served in the Argentine Senate from 1881 until he died in 1884, replacing Manuel Pizarro as senator for Santa Fe.

== Influence ==
Governor Bayo also created the office of the General Inspector of Schools, which was the basis for today's provincial Ministry of Education, and passed a law that made elementary education compulsory for all children.

A biography of Servando Bayo, Santa Fe. Una Época. Un Gobernador. Servando Bayo, was published in 2006 by Jorge Campana.

Preceded by Simón de Iriondo	Governor of Santa Fe; 1874–1878	Succeeded by Simón de Iriondo
