= Cosme Argerich =

Argentine physician

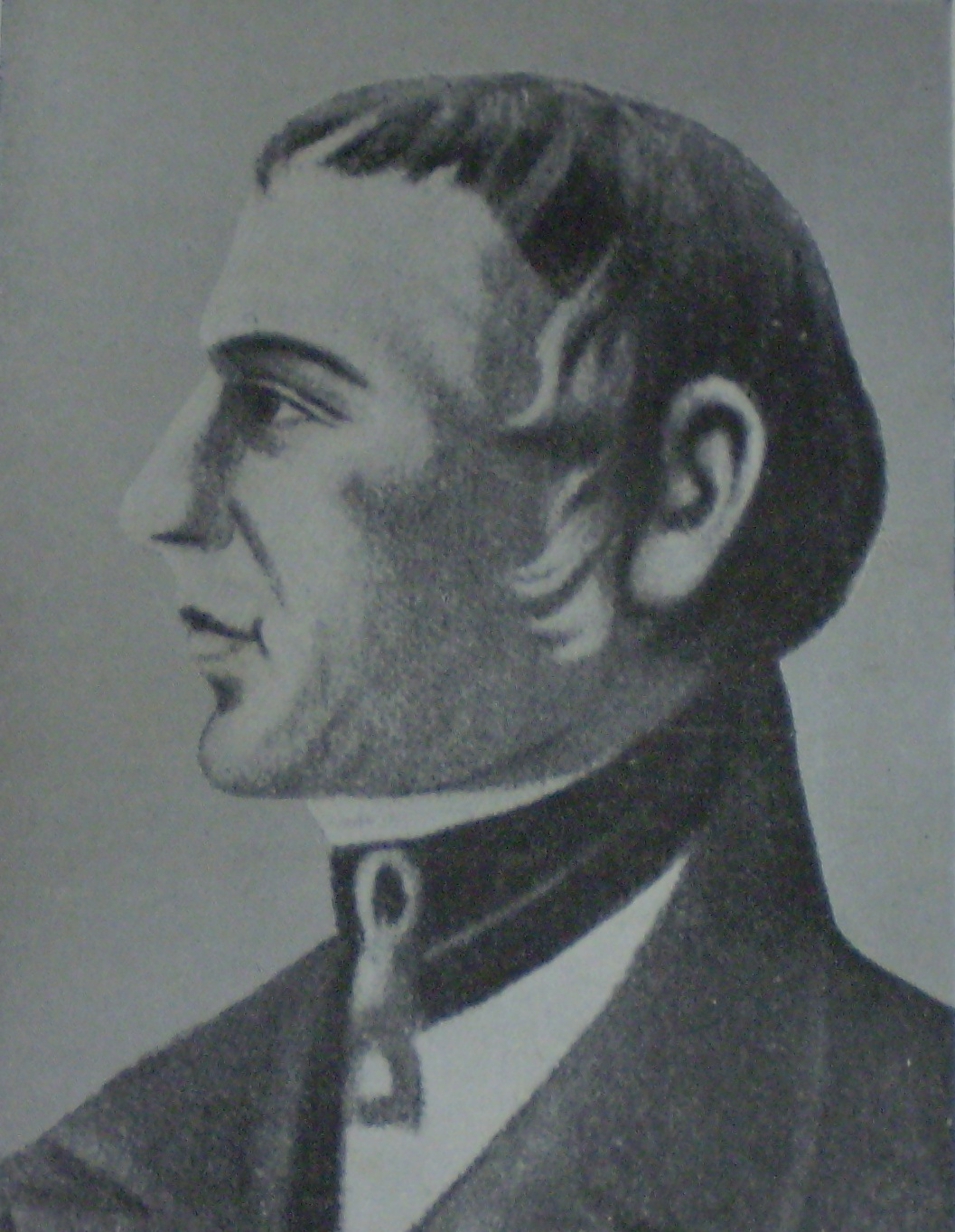
Cosme Argerich.

Cosme Mariano Argerich (26 September 1758 – 14 February 1820) was a pioneer of military medical practices in Argentina.

== Biography ==
Born in Buenos Aires, he became the first officer to be appointed as the Surgeon General in the Argentine Army. He received his medical doctorate in 1783 from the University of Cervera in Spain, and thereafter practiced medicine in Barcelona until 1784. Returning to Argentina that same year, he was instrumental in containing the smallpox epidemics of 1794 and 1796, becoming the country's primary advocate for popular immunization. During the English invasion attempts of 1806 and 1807, he distinguished himself in providing medical treatment to wounded soldiers. As a notable citizen of Buenos Aires, he took part of the debates which led to the May Revolution, from 18 to 25 May 1810.

He was the primary proponent of the country's Instituto Médico Militar, founded on 13 March 1813. That same year, he was appointed as the organization's director, a position that he held until his death in 1820, overseeing the nation's premiere medical training facility. He was also commissioned in the Argentine Army as a surgeon, and was responsible for training and establishing a medical corps for General José de San Martín's expeditionary force to Chile that required crossing the Andes mountain chain (a Hannibal-inspired military victory instrumental to securing the country's independence from Spain).

The main military hospital in Buenos Aires is named after him.
