= Arístides Villanueva =

Argentine politician (1825–1900)

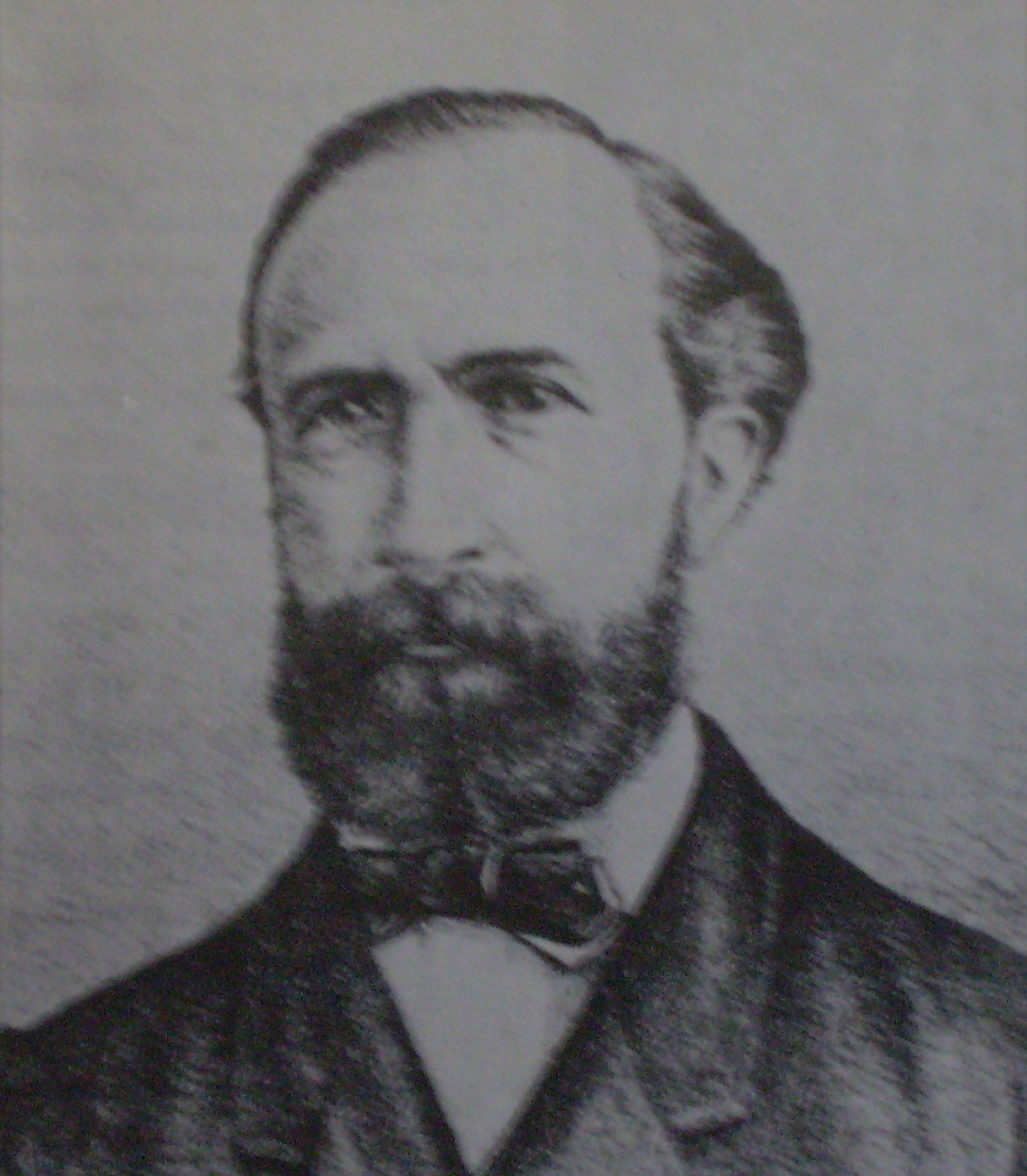

Governor of Mendoza
- In office November 20, 1870 – October 11, 1873
- Preceded by: Nicolás Villanueva
- Succeeded by: Francisco Civit

Personal details
- Born: August 11, 1825 Mendoza, Argentina
- Died: August 7, 1900 (aged 74) Río Cuarto, Córdoba
- Party: Autonomist Party
- Spouse: Vicenta Doncel
- Children: Guillermo, Vicenta
- Profession: Politician, merchant

Juan Bautista Arístides Villanueva Chenaut (1825-1900) was an Argentine politician and merchant who governed Mendoza Province during 1870 to 1873.

== Biography ==
Arístides Villanueva was born on August 11, 1825, in Mendoza, Argentina. He was son of José María Villanueva Pelliza and Juana Chenaut Moyano. Villanueva had a sister called Carolina. In 1844, Villanueva got married with Vicenta Doncel in San Juan city. He had two children: Guillermo and Vicenta Villanueva.

== Political career ==
He held various provincial and national political offices. He was War and Navy National Minister. He was also President of the Argentine Chamber of Deputies. Later he held the office of governor of Mendoza from November 20, 1870, to October 11, 1873. He succeeded his cousin Nicolás Villanueva, who had begun a period in Mendoza Province History known as "family governments".

== Tributes ==
Currently, a main avenue of Mendoza has his name. Due to the contribution to education, also an ancient school, located in the downtown, has it.

== Notes ==
Political offices
Preceded by Nicolás Villanueva	Governor of Mendoza; 1870–1873	Succeeded by Francisco Civit
