= Simón de Iriondo =

Argentine politician

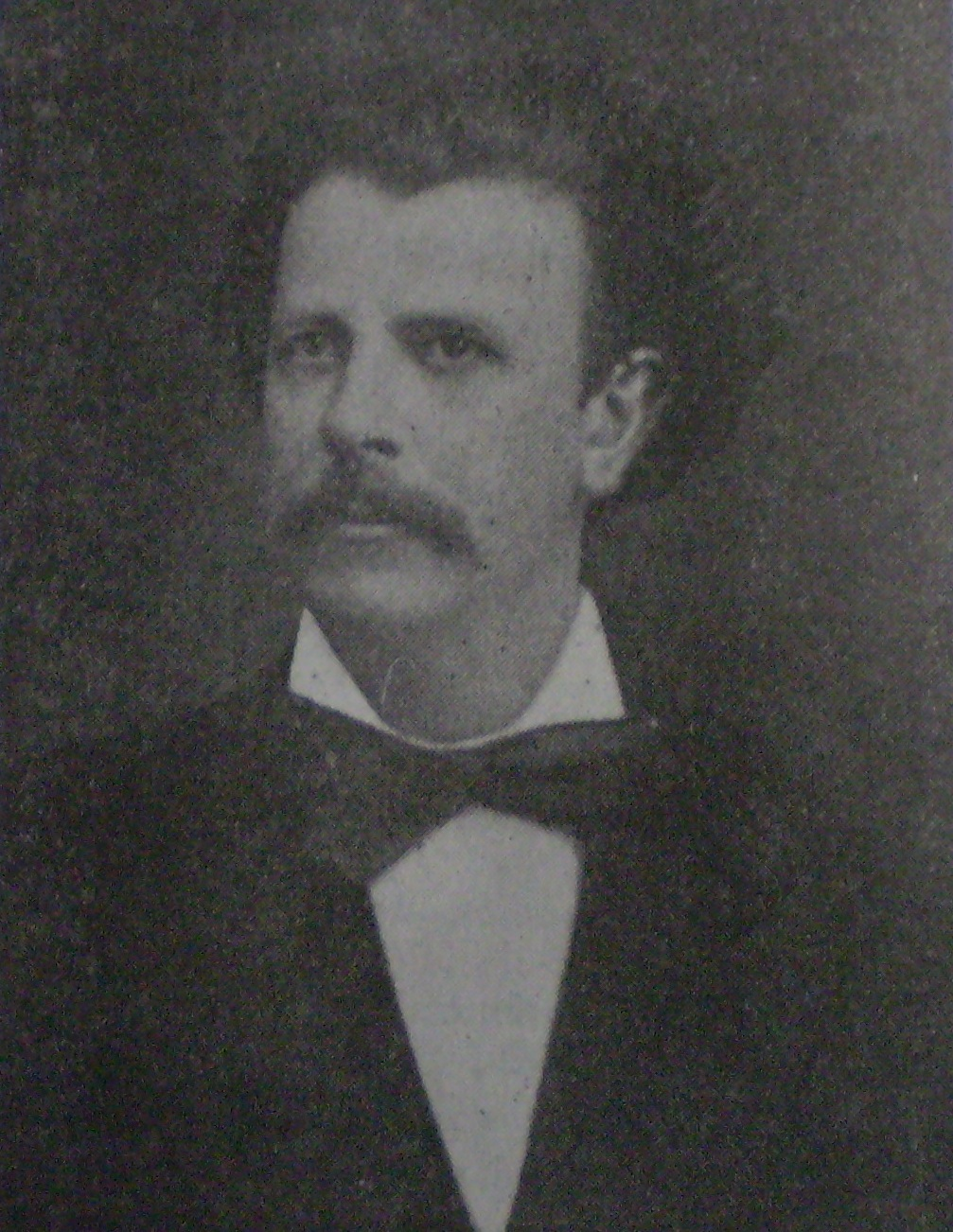

Personal details
- Born: 28 October 1836
- Died: 30 November 1883 (aged 47)
- Party: National Autonomist Party

Simón de Iriondo (Spanish pronunciation: [siˈmon de iˈɾjondo]; 28 October 1836 – 30 November 1883) was an Argentine politician of the National Autonomist Party, who was twice governor of the province of Santa Fe, from 1871 to 1874 and from 1878 to 1882.

Iriondo was also the Government Minister of governor Mariano Cabal and part of the cabinet of President Nicolás Avellaneda. After his second term in office, in 1883, he was appointed senator.

As a governor, Iriondo supported the policy of colonization, as Santa Fe was scarcely populated at the time except for the large cities of Santa Fe and Rosario on the banks of the Paraná River. He founded a colony in the north of the province which become the present-day city of Reconquista.

His administration amended the Provincial Constitution of 1863, and created public libraries in Santa Fe, Rosario, San Carlos and Coronda.

Preceded by Mariano Cabal	Governor of Santa Fe; 1871–1874	Succeeded by Servando Bayo
Preceded by Servando Bayo	Governor of Santa Fe; 1878–1882	Succeeded by Manuel María Zavalla
