= Nicasio Oroño =

Argentine politician and lawyer (1825–1904)

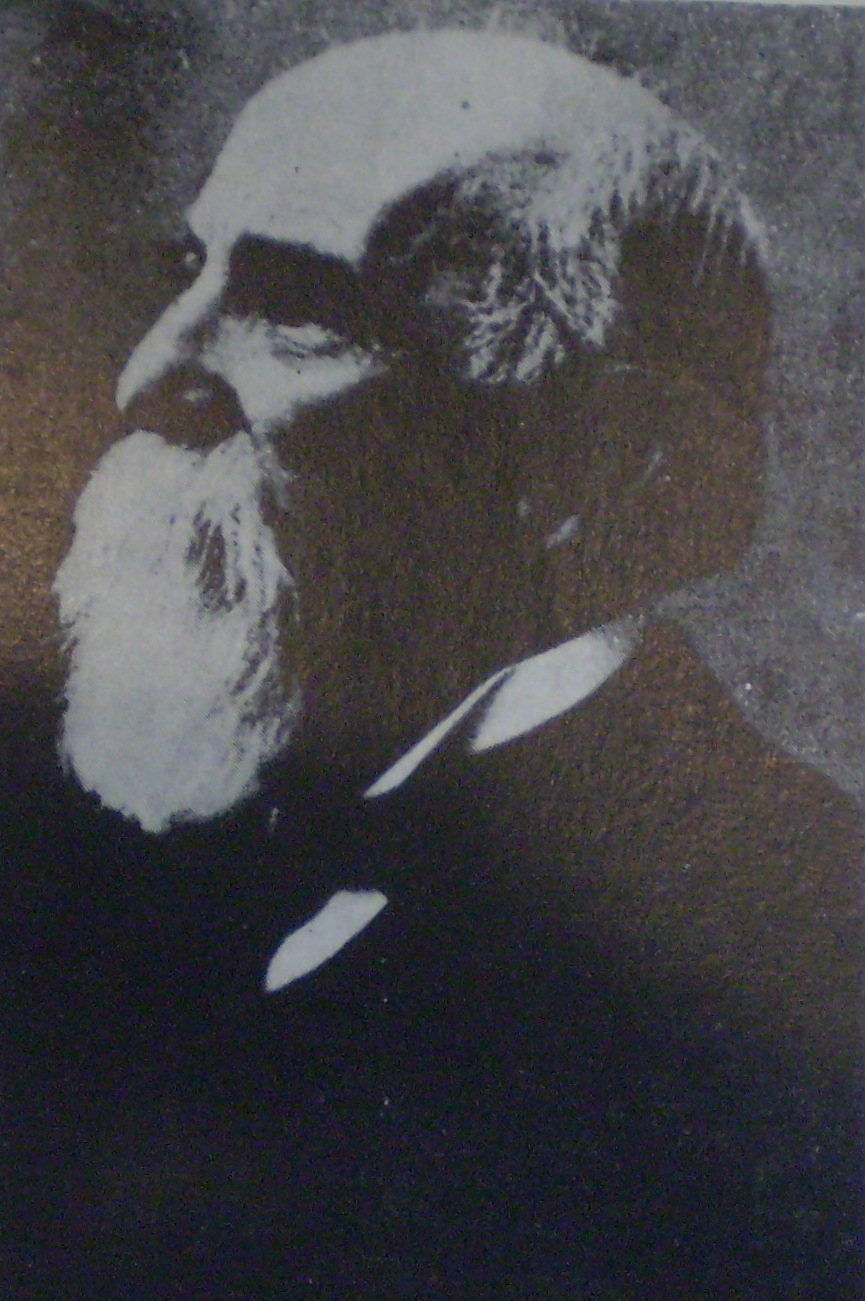
Nicasio Oroño

Nicasio V. Oroño (July 20, 1825 in Coronda, Santa Fe – October 12, 1904 in Santa Fe) was an Argentine politician and lawyer, and governor of Santa Fe between 1865 and 1868.

== Youth in the military ==
Oroño was born to Unitarian Coronel Santiago Oroño and Juana Ávila Baigorria. At age 16, he joined his father and participated of the military campaigns directed by Juan Lavalle and José María Paz. In 1839, he married Joaquina Cullen, daughter of Santa Fe governor Domingo Cullen.

In 1852, he participated of the Battle of Caseros, fighting together with the forces of Entre Ríos under the command of Ricardo López Jordán, one of the divisions of the Grand Army, against the forces of Buenos Aires led by Juan Manuel de Rosas.

== Political career ==
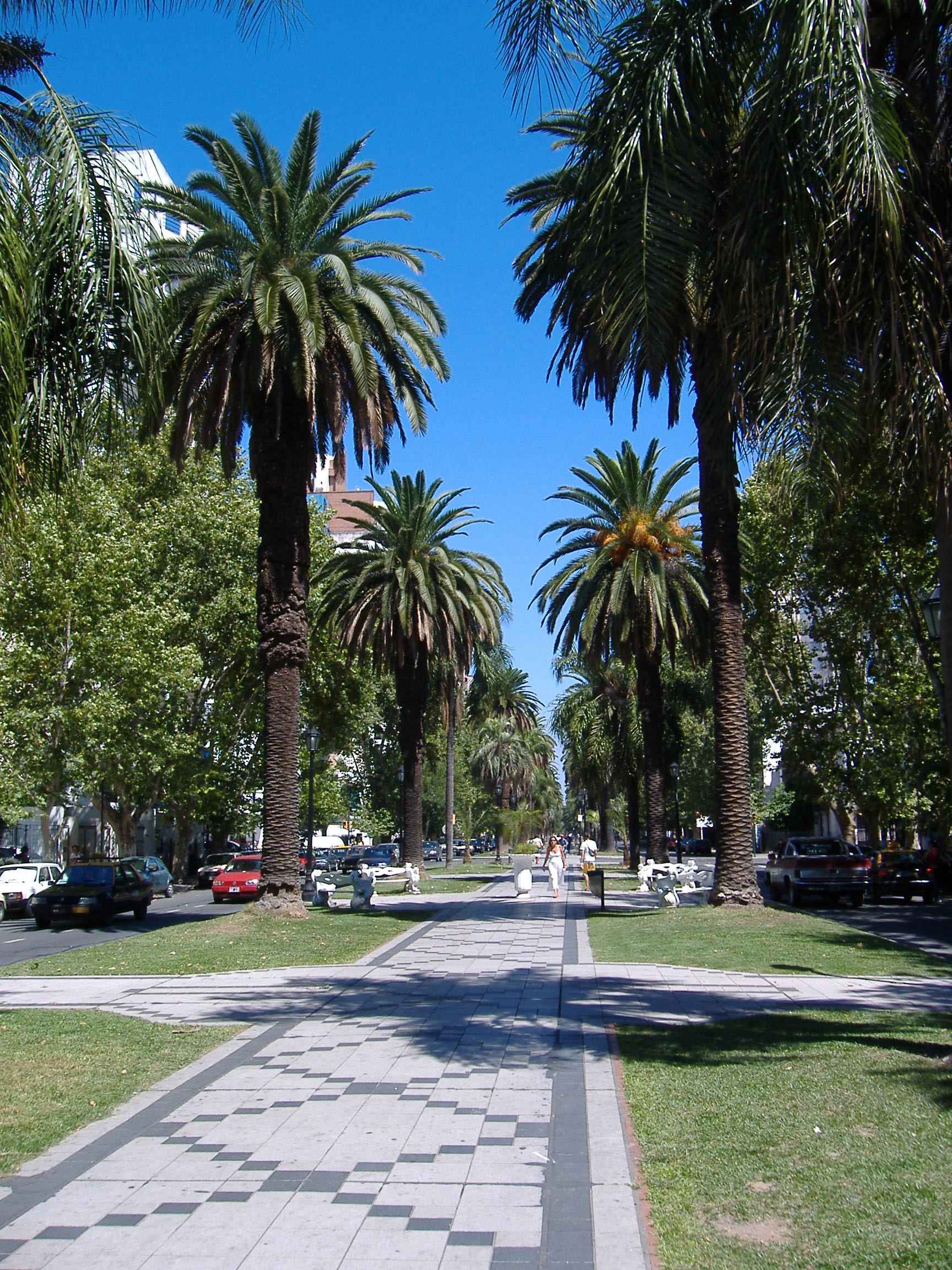
Oroño Boulevard in downtown Rosario, named after Nicasio Oroño.

In 1854 Oroño sent a letter to president of the Argentine Confederation Justo José de Urquiza with a proposal for the institutional organization of Rosario, which was approved. On August 17 of that year he was named Customs Administrator, an important position during those times.

After the promulgation of the law that gave Rosario city status, the governor of Santa Fe José María Cullen, Oroño's brother-in-law, named him political chief of the city. Oroño created a vigilance service for the city. Under his administration the Provincial Hospital of Rosario was opened. The Municipality of Rosario honoured his legacy by renaming a major street as Oroño Boulevard in 1904.

Together with Marcelino Freyre, Oroño represented Santa Fe in the Assembly that wrote the Argentine Constitution in 1853.

In 1862 Oroño was elected member of the Chamber of Deputies, but in 1865 he resigned, after being chosen to replace Patricio Cullen as governor of Santa Fe Province. In the latter office he focused on the institutionalization of the province. When he finished his mandate in 1868 he was elected national senator, and from his seat he promoted the expansion and population of the country.

After a period of political inactivity, Oroño was named director of the Office of Lands and Colonies of the Nation in 1891, but was removed from the charge after political differences with president Luis Sáenz Peña.

In 1899 he was elected as constitutional deputy for the convention that a year later sanctioned the provincial constitution of Santa Fe. He was again elected national deputy in 1902, but died two years later.

| Preceded by Patricio Cullen | Governor of Santa Fe; 1865–1868 | Succeeded by Mariano Cabal |
