= Félix de la Peña =

Argentine politician

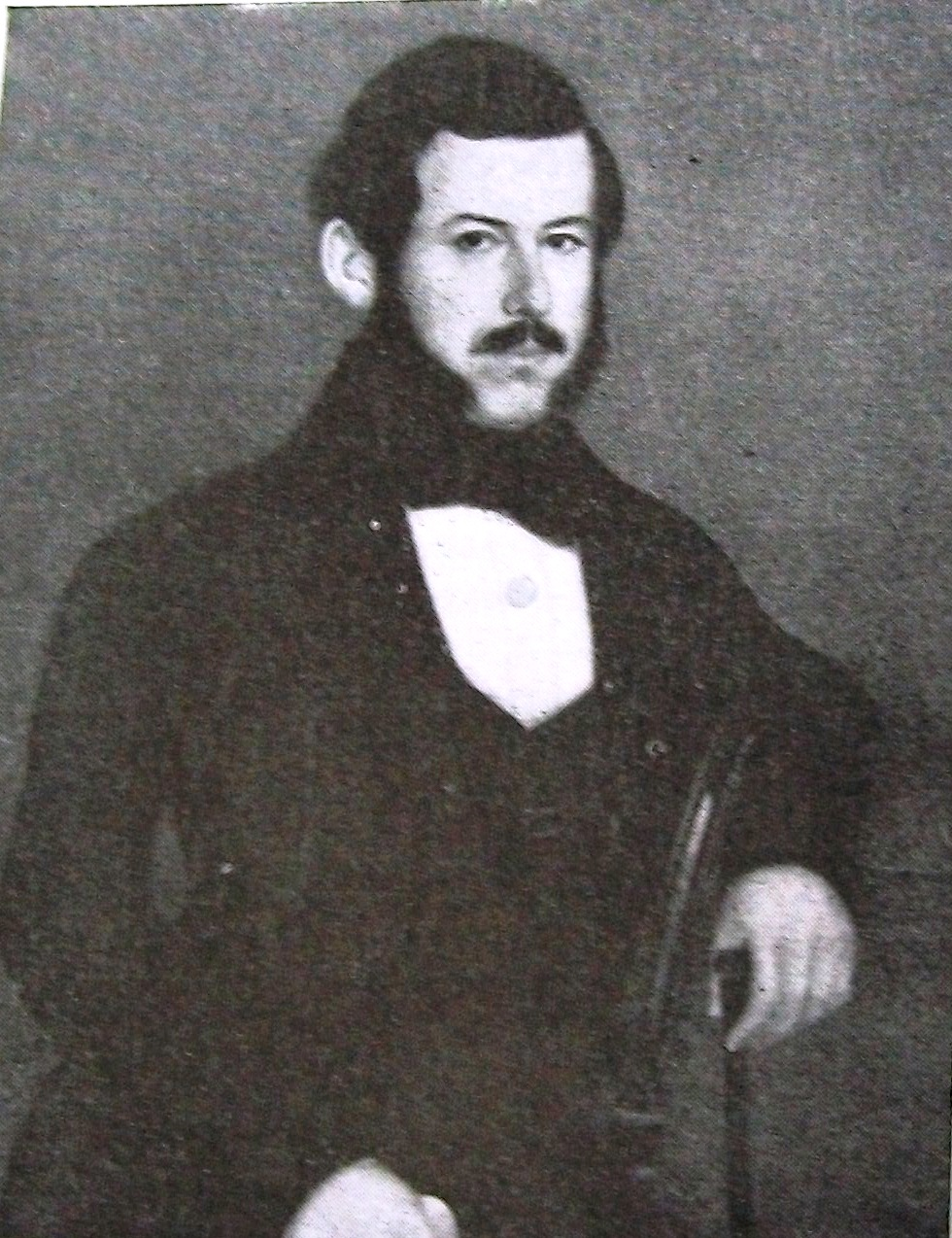

Governor of Córdoba
- In office 1867–1871
- Preceded by: Mateo Luque
- Succeeded by: Juan Antonio Álvarez

Personal details
- Died: August 23, 1873

Félix de la Peña (died August 23, 1873) was an Argentine politician, and governor of Córdoba Province, Argentina.

After accepting the resignation of Mariano Fragueiro, the Córdoba lower house of representatives named Félix de la Peña as interim governor on July 24, 1860, and soon thereafter confirmed him to the post. He continued the work of his predecessor, dividing big departments into smaller units to simplify their governance and administration. He created the San Justo Department, and Unión Department. His legislation started the first steam-powered mill in the province, increasing the production of flour which, along with leather products and mining, became the main exports for the Cordoba economy.

After the assassination of San Juan Province governor, Antonino Aberastian, by the governor of San Luis Province, Colonel Juan Saá, Félix de la Peña deplored this incident and made him responsible for this tragedy. The situation became tense when Saá marched the provincial troops towards Córdoba, forcing de la Peña to organize the provincial militia.

On May 18, 1861, Congress authorized president Santiago Derqui to raise armies in the provinces of Córdoba, San Luis, Santa Fe, and Santiago del Estero. He simultaneously decided on federal intervention on Córdoba Province.

President Derqui moved his army to the fields at La Tablada, Córdoba, replaced Félix de la Peña, and established himself in the provincial capital, where he personally assumed control of the provincial government,

Political offices
Preceded by Mateo Luque	Governor of Córdoba; 1867-1871	Succeeded by Juan Antonio Álvarez
Preceded by José Alejo Román	Governor of Córdoba; 1861	Succeeded by Marcos Paz
Preceded by Mariano Fragueiro	Governor of Córdoba; 1860-1861	Succeeded by Santiago Derqui
