= Mariano Cabal =

Argentine governor

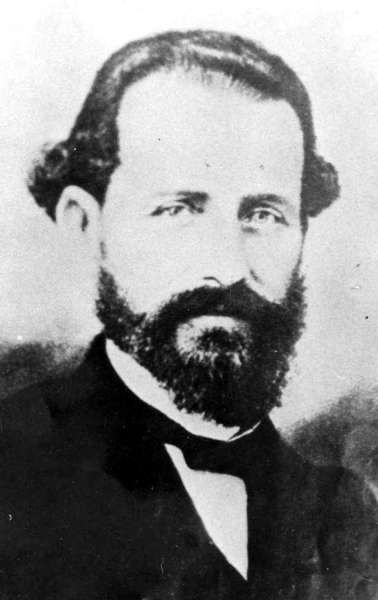
Mariano Cabal.

Mariano Cabal (12 April 1830 – 1885) was the governor of the province of Santa Fe, Argentina between 9 April 1886 and 7 April 1871.

Major achievements of Cabal's administration were, among others, the opening of the first telegraph line between Rosario and Buenos Aires, and the railway link between Rosario and Córdoba (through the Ferrocarril Central Argentino), in 1870.

Cabal pushed the colonized frontiers of Santa Fe Province southward, up to the current towns of Teodelina and Venado Tuerto (34° S), and northward, up to the latitude of present-day Morteros, Córdoba (about 30° 40’ S), thus bringing the area of the province to 57,000 km^{2}. The provincial government continued the policy of sponsoring settlements of European immigrants as agricultural colonies. Cabal is acknowledged as the official founder of the city of San Justo and several smaller towns, including Saladero Cabal and Emilia (named after his wife).

By a decree of 1869, Cabal authorized the creation of a university career including the teaching of Civil Law, Canonical Law and Natural Law at the Law School of the Jesuit-ruled College of the Immaculate Conception in Santa Fe City. This was the origin of today's Faculty of Social and Juridical Sciences of the National University of the Littoral.

During the last year of Cabal's rule, Santa Fe contributed with the national government (led by president Domingo Faustino Sarmiento) to suffocate Ricardo López Jordán's uprising in the neighbouring Entre Ríos Province.

Once finished his governorship, Cabal was a deputy for the capital district of Santa Fe between 1871 and 1872, and a senator between 1872 and 1876. He collaborated with the reform of the provincial constitution of 1873. He was succeeded by his personal friend and minister Simón de Iriondo.

Cabal died in Buenos Aires at the age of 55.

Preceded by Nicasio Oroño	Governor of Santa Fe; 1886–1871	Succeeded by Simón de Iriondo
