= 1927 in Argentina =

- Decades: 1900s; 1910s; 1920s; 1930s; 1940s
- See also: Other events of 1927; List of years in Argentina

Events from the year 1927 in Argentina

== Incumbents ==
- President: Marcelo Torcuato de Alvear
- Vice President: Elpidio González

=== Governors ===
- Buenos Aires Province: Valentin Vergara
- Cordoba: Ramón J. Cárcano
- Mendoza Province: Alejandro Orfila

=== Vice Governors ===
- Buenos Aires Province: Victoriano de Ortúzar

== Events ==
- 14 April – An earthquake in Mendoza Province causes three deaths and several injuries.
- 29 November – The World Chess Championship, played in Buenos Aires over a period of more than two months, is won by Russian Alexander Alekhine, scoring +6−3=25.

== Births ==
=== February ===
- 18 February – Osvaldo Bayer, writer and journalist (died 2018)
- 23 February – Mirtha Legrand and Silvia Legrand (died 2020), twin actresses

=== March ===
- 12 March – Raúl Alfonsín, 49th President of Argentina (died 2009)

=== April ===
- 21 April – Tato Bores, comedian (died 1996)

=== June ===
- 3 June – Eliseo Mouriño, footballer (died 1961)
- 19 June – Luciano Benjamín Menéndez, Argentine general (died 2018)

=== July ===
- 2 July – Jaime Rest, translator, literary critic, writer and teacher (died 1979)

== Deaths ==
- 31 October – Ricardo Güiraldes, novelist and poet (born 1886)

== See also ==
- 1927 in Argentine football
