= 1928 in Argentina =

- Decades: 1900s; 1910s; 1920s; 1930s; 1940s
- See also: Other events of 1928; List of years in Argentina

Events from the year 1928 in Argentina

== Incumbents ==
- President:
  - Marcelo Torcuato de Alvear (until 11 October)
  - Hipólito Yrigoyen (from 12 October)
- Vice President:
  - Elpidio González (until 11 October)
  - Enrique Martínez (from 12 October)

=== Governors ===
- Buenos Aires Province: Valentin Vergara
- Cordoba: Ramón J. Cárcano then Enrique Martínez then José Antonio Ceballos
- Mendoza Province:
  - Alejandro Orfila (until 4 December)
  - Carlos A. Borzani (from 4 December)

=== Vice Governors ===
- Buenos Aires Province: Victoriano de Ortúzar

== Events ==
- April 1 – 1928 Argentine general election: Hipólito Yrigoyen replaces Marcelo Torcuato de Alvear, whom he had chosen as his successor, as presidential candidate and defeats his opponent Leopoldo Melo.
- May 23 – The Italian consulate in Buenos Aires, Argentina, is bombed. The explosion kills 22 people and injures 43.

== Births ==
=== January ===
- January 28 – Jorge Zorreguieta, businessman and politician (died 2017)

=== March ===
- March 6 – Zoe Ducós, actress (died 2002)

=== June ===
- June 14 – Che Guevara, Marxist revolutionary (died 1967)

=== July ===
- July 8 – Ángel Tulio Zof, footballer and coach (died 2014)

== Deaths ==
=== May ===
- May 22 – Francisco López Merino, poet (b. 1904)

=== July ===
- July 22 – Francisco Beiró, politician, vice president-elect (born 1876)
