= 1929 in Argentina =

- Decades: 1900s; 1910s; 1920s; 1930s; 1940s
- See also: Other events of 1929; List of years in Argentina

Events from the year 1929 in Argentina

== Incumbents ==
- President: Hipólito Yrigoyen
- Vice President: Enrique Martínez

=== Governors ===
- Buenos Aires Province: Valentin Vergara
- Cordoba: José Antonio Ceballos
- Mendoza Province: Carlos A. Borzani

=== Vice Governors ===
- Buenos Aires Province: Victoriano de Ortúzar

== Events ==
- 1 June – The 1st Conference of the Communist Parties of Latin America opens in Buenos Aires.

== Births ==
- 1 February – Basilio Lami Dozo, dictator (died 2017)
- 17 February – Omar Monza, Argentine basketball player (died 2017)
- 26 February – Enriqueta Duarte, swimmer (died 2025)
- 11 June – Antonio Pujía, Argentine sculptor (died 2018)
- 25 September – Pepe Soriano, actor (d. 2023)
- 14 October – Norbert Gastell, actor (died 2015)

== Deaths ==
- 19 October – Antonio Bermejo, judge, lawyer and politician (born 1853)
