= 1930 in Argentina =

- Decades: 1910s; 1920s; 1930s; 1940s; 1950s
- See also: Other events of 1930; List of years in Argentina

Events from the year 1930 in Argentina

== Incumbents ==
- President:
  - Hipólito Yrigoyen (until 6 September)
  - José Félix Uriburu (from 6 September)
- Vice President: Enrique Martínez (until 6 September); Enrique Santamarina (6 September-20 October)

=== Governors ===
- Buenos Aires Province:
  - until 1 May: Valentin Vergara
  - 1 May-11 September: Nereo Crovetto
  - from 11 September: Carlos Meyer Pellegrini
- Cordoba: José Antonio Ceballos; Basilio Pertiné; Carlos Ibarguren
- Mendoza Province: Carlos A. Borzani (until 7 September); Ergasto Saforcada (until 25 September); José María Rosa (from 25 September)

== Events ==
- 10 March – Goodbye Argentina (Adiós Argentina), the first Argentine film with a (musical) soundtrack, is released, giving Ada Cornaro her first starring role and Libertad Lamarque her film debut.
- 12 July – A streetcar accident occurs near Buenos Aires, when the vehicle's operator fails to notice that the moveable bridge for the tracks has been raised to allow a crossing of the Río de la Plata. The car plunges into the river and its passengers are drowned.
- 6 September – 1930 Argentine coup d'état: José Félix Uriburu leads troops into Buenos Aires and carries out a military coup, ousting incumbent president Hipólito Yrigoyen.

== Births ==
=== January ===
- 6 January – Oscar Camilión, lawyer and diplomat (d. 2016)

=== February ===
- 8 February – Alejandro Rey, film and TV actor and television director (d. 1987)

=== March ===
- 3 March - Alfredo Alcón, theatre and film actor (d. 2014)

=== April ===
- 6 April – Pampero Firpo, Argentinian/American professional wrestler (d. 2020)

=== May ===
- 3 May – Juan Gelman, poet and author (d. 2014)

=== July ===
- 2 July – Carlos Menem, President of Argentina 1989-1999 (d. 2021)

== See also ==
- List of Argentine films of 1930
