= Miguel Ángel Cárcano =

Argentine politician

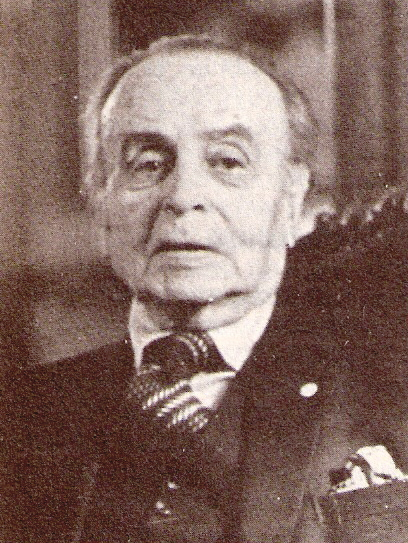
Miguel Ángel Cárcano

Miguel Ángel Cárcano (18 July 1889 – 9 May 1978) was an Argentine politician, who served as Minister of Foreign Affairs during the presidency of Arturo Frondizi, between 1961 and 1962, and Ambassador of Argentina to France and to United Kingdom.

He was born in Córdoba, to Ramón J. Cárcano, politician. He graduated in Law from the National University of Córdoba and in 1917 he earned the National Prize of Literature for his book Evolución histórica del régimen de la tierra pública, about the agrarian situation of Argentina.

He was elected National Deputy for Córdoba province and was part of the team which negotiate the Roca–Runciman Treaty in 1933. In 1936 to 1938 he was Minister of Agriculture designated by president Agustín P. Justo.

He died in Buenos Aires on 9 May 1978.
