= Día del Trabajador Telepostal =

Dia del Trabajador Telepostal Description

Día del Trabajador Telepostal ('Day of the Postal and Telecommunication Worker') is an event observed annually on April 7 in Argentina. The event commemorates the move of the then Director-General of the Postal Service, Eduardo Olivera, launches the Postal Law (which paved way for the merger of the Postal and Telegraph Directorates).

During the privatization of Correo Argentino (1997-2003), the event was no longer observed as a holiday. In 2008 the Ministry of Labour, Employment and Social Security issued a resolution re-instating the commemoration as a National Mandatory Holiday for all workers of Correo Argentino.
