= Pablo Murgier =

Argentinian/French pianist and composer

Pablo Murgier Pazdera
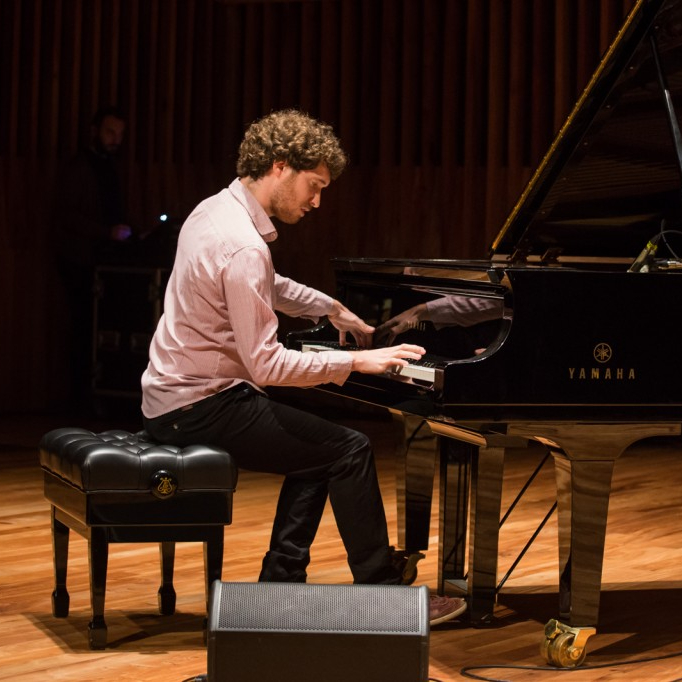
- Murgier in concert, 2022

Background information
- Born: August 23, 1988 (age 37); La Plata, Buenos Aires, Argentina
- Genres: Jazz, Tango
- Occupations: Pianist; Composer; Arranger
- Instrument: Piano
- Website: pablomurgier.com

Pablo Murgier Pazdera (born August 23, 1988) is a pianist, arranger and composer from Argentina based in Paris, France. He is best known for his project the Pablo Murgier Ensemble, which was awarded the first World Tango Orchestra Award as part of the Tango International Meeting for Musicians at the CCK in Buenos Aires, and its first album was nominated to the Premios Gardel in the Best New Artist category.

== Biography ==
Pablo Murgier, born in La Plata, Buenos Aires (Argentina) in 1988, has been living in Paris (France) since 2017. He holds a degree in musical composition from the National University of Quilmes and a master's degree in Latin American Music Performance from the 20th century at the National University of Cuyo. Currently, he develops his musical activity principally by performing as a soloist, with the Pablo Murgier Ensemble, No Tags, Los Milonguitas Tango and the duo he trains with Ana Karina Rossi.

He has recorded several discographic productions, with musical projects centered around tango, jazz-fusion, free improvisation, and classical music. As a soloist, he has given concerts of academic and popular music in many halls and institutions, and has toured in Argentina, Uruguay, Chile, Russia, the United States, China and throughout Europe.

He composed and performed the music for the play Fêtes Galantes Spectacle (Paul Verlaine) and Ephemera. He has adapted and recorded film music for various productions (Netflix/France 2/Arte). He was invited to participate in the convocation Piazzolla 2020 – La historia continua.

In 2017, he created his own project, the Pablo Murgier Ensemble, where he distinguished himself both as a composer and pianist. The band was awarded the first World Tango Orchestra Award as part of the Tango International Meeting for Musicians at the CCK in Buenos Aires, and its first album was nominated to the Premios Gardel in the Best New Artist category.

He was invited by TANGOdeHOY to be part of Ástor 2020, la historia continúa as one of the tango composers of the 21st century.

== Discography ==
- El Lago with Federico Biraben Cuarteto (Independent, 2015)
- Muy Lejos with Pablo Murgier Ensemble (Independent, 2017)
- Rosa y Negro with Los Milonguitas (Collectif ¿Por qué No?, 2018)
- Los Espejos Piano Solo Album (Collectif ¿Por qué no?, 2019)
- Reflets with Pablo Murgier Ensemble (Collectif ¿Por qué no?, 2020)
- Astor 2020 with various artists (Independent, 2020)
- Aurícula with Federico Biraben Cuarteto (Independent, 2020)
- Tiempo Interrumpido with Alex Musatov and Federico Biraben (Collectif ¿Por qué no?, 2020)
- Evidencia with Ana Karina Rossi (Collectif ¿Por qué no?, 2022)
- Gare du Sud with Pablo Murgier Ensemble (Collectif ¿Por qué no?, 2022)
- Azimut Project with No Tags (Collectif ¿Por qué no?, 2022)
- Live in Nuremberg with Los Milonguitas (Collectif ¿Por qué no?, 2022)
- Sirocco Piano Solo Album (Collectif ¿Por qué no?, 2026)

== Awards ==
- "Best Tango Orchestra" in the first World Tango Orchestra Award as part of the Tango International Meeting for Musicians at the CCK in Buenos Aires, 2017.
- Nominated "Best New Artist in Tango" in the Premios Gardel 2018.
