= Libertad Palace =

Building in Buenos Aires, Argentina

Libertad Palace, Domingo Faustino Sarmiento Cultural Center
- Palacio Libertad, Centro Cultural Domingo Faustino Sarmiento

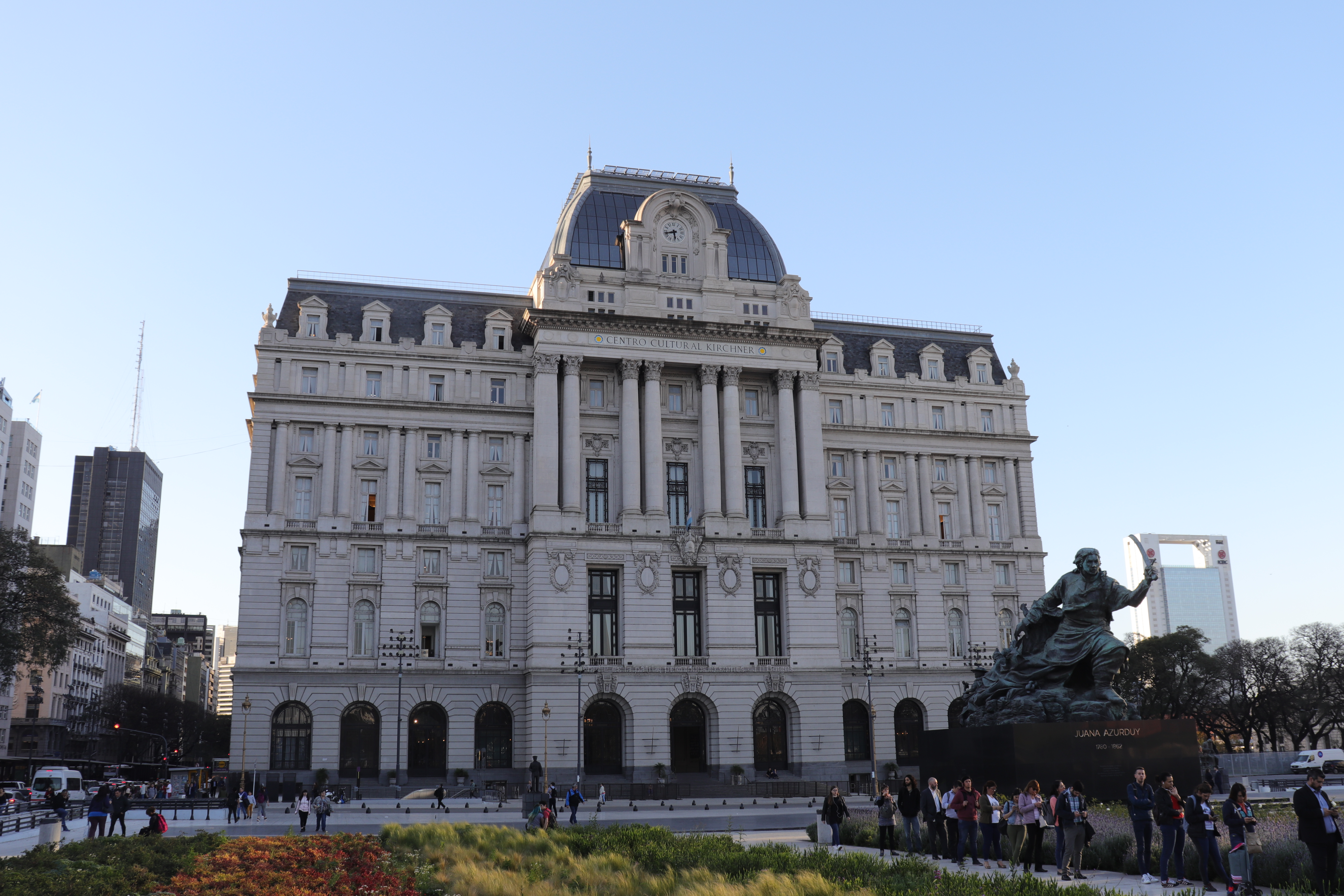
- The Post and Telecommunications Palace in 2019, current home to the cultural center

- Location within Buenos Aires

General information
- Status: Completed
- Type: Government
- Location: Sarmiento 151; Buenos Aires
- Coordinates: 34°36′12″S 58°22′10″W
- Construction started: 1908
- Completed: 1928
- Opening: 1928; 98 years ago

Height
- Roof: 60 m (200 ft)

Technical details
- Floor count: 8
- Floor area: 88,050 m^{2} (947,800 sq ft)

Design and construction
- Architect: Norbert Maillart
- Developer: Government of Argentina
- Main contractor: GEOPÉ

Website
- palaciolibertad.gob.ar

The Libertad Palace, Domingo Faustino Sarmiento Cultural Center (Spanish: Palacio Libertad, Centro Cultural Domingo Faustino Sarmiento) is a cultural centre located in the Post and Telecommunications Palace in Buenos Aires, Argentina. It is the largest of Latin America, and the third or fourth largest in the world.

The building was originally opened in 1928 as the Buenos Aires Central Post Office ("Palacio de Correos"), operating until 2002. During successive years, it was refurbished and reopened in 2015 as a cultural center. It was named Centro Cultural Néstor Kirchner (CCK) for nine years, after the former president of Argentina, who had overseen its conversion. The name was politically polarizing in Argentina, with the country's presidency announcing the name would be changed in March 2024. Despite this, the name "Palacio Libertad" only applies to the building itself. As of October 10, 2024, the building was renamed "Domingo Faustino Sarmiento".

The nine-floor centre has a concert hall; five other auditoriums for theater and concerts; 18 halls for poetry readings, performance art, and other events; 40 rooms of art and history galleries totaling 15,000 square meters (160,000 sq ft) on six floors; 16 rehearsal rooms; and two rooftop terraces. It is possible to reach the centre with Line B and Line E of the city's underground, at Leandro N. Alem and Correo Central respectively.

== History ==
=== Buenos Aires Central Post Office ===
The need for a new central post office in Buenos Aires was first raised in 1888 by the director of the Correo Argentino (Argentine Postal Service) at the time, Dr. Ramón J. Cárcano. Later that year a congressional bill providing for its construction was signed by President Miguel Juárez Celman. The Ministry of Public Works commissioned French architect Norbert Maillart for its design in 1889.

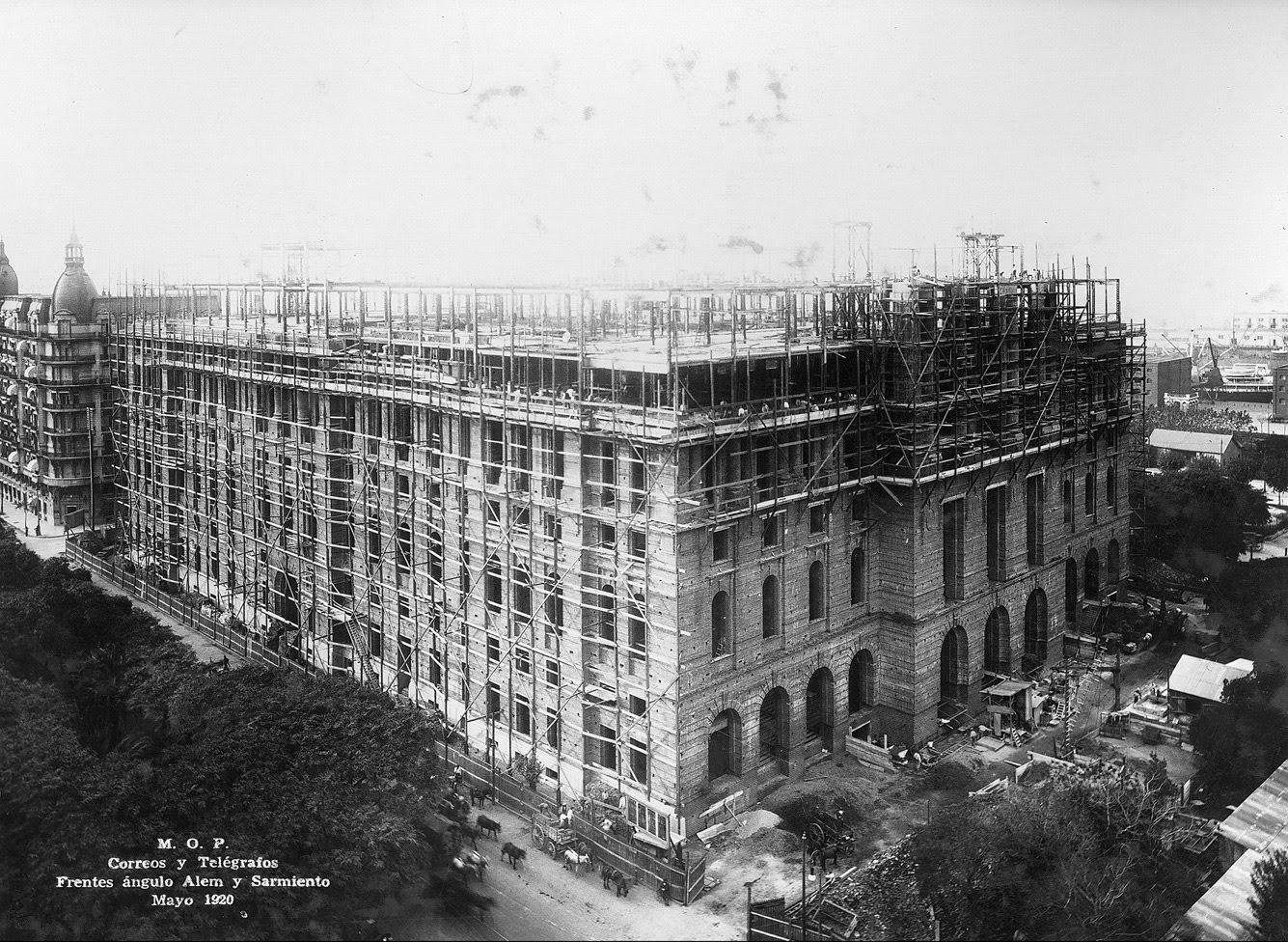
The post office under construction (c. 1920)

Designating a 12,500 square meters (135,000 sq ft) city block on the corner of Leandro Alem and Corrientes Avenues for its construction, the Public Works Ministry chose the site as a means to beautify a land reclamation site where the shores of the Río de la Plata had reached just a decade earlier. The sudden onset of the Panic of 1890 and the subsequent crisis led to President Juárez Celman's resignation, however, as well as to the project's suspension.

The national government revived the plans only in 1905, and in 1908 Maillart returned to Buenos Aires, where his new plans for a larger post office were approved the following April. Differences later arose between Maillart and the Argentine government, and the French architect abandoned the project in 1911. Construction, which had just started, was then left to the supervision of Maillart's chief assistant, Jacques Spolsky. Spolsky reengineered the design, which featured masonry supports, to consist of a steel-reinforced concrete structure, for which 2,882 steel pillars were placed onto the bedrock, 10 meters (33 ft) deep.

Limitations on the city's public works budgets resulting from the onset of World War I forced another major design alteration in 1916. The planned construction of an elevated causeway on Leandro Alem Avenue was cancelled, and a mezzanine was quickly added to the plans to compensate for an entrance which would now be one floor below the original's. Spolsky achieved this without substantial changes to the building's exterior, though the number of delays led to considerable cost overruns on the project, and its budget was exhausted in 1923. President Marcelo Torcuato de Alvear, however, obtained congressional support for a new appropriation, and on September 28, 1928 (two weeks before the end of Alvear's tenure), the new Secretaría de Comunicaciones was inaugurated.

The building's eclectic design, drawing prominently from French Second Empire architecture, was typical of the public buildings and upscale real estate built in Buenos Aires and other Argentine cities early in the 20th century. Despite their differences, Maillart went on to design the Buenos Aires National College and the Argentine Supreme Court, and Spolsky designed post offices for Rosario and San Miguel de Tucumán in a similar style while at work on this structure.

The largest public building completed in Argentina up to that point, the building measured eight stories and 60 meters (200 ft) in height and included over 88,000 square meters (950,000 sq ft) of indoor space. The central hall was decorated with marble throughout, features stained glass windows, numerous bronze sculptures and mail drop boxes, and a four-story-high domed ceiling.

=== Perón era ===
The grandiose setting led President Juan Perón to move his offices in the building during the early years of his 1946–55 tenure, and the First Lady, Eva Perón, designated a wing as the first headquarters of the charitable Eva Perón Foundation.

During the subsequent automobile boom in Argentina, the plaza facing the post office was made into a parking lot. Opposition to the 1979 sale of the parking lot for the construction of a local Bank of Tokyo headquarters proved insurmountable, and the plans were cancelled. Guillermo del Cioppo, the minister of urban development and later mayor, ordered the construction of an underground parking structure instead, and the lot above was converted into a park in 1983.

The building was designated a National Historic Monument in 1997. Most of its postal activities had been transferred to a newer structure during the Perón administration, and it handled only international mail in later years. In 2005, its last remaining postal bureau was closed.

=== Cultural centre ===
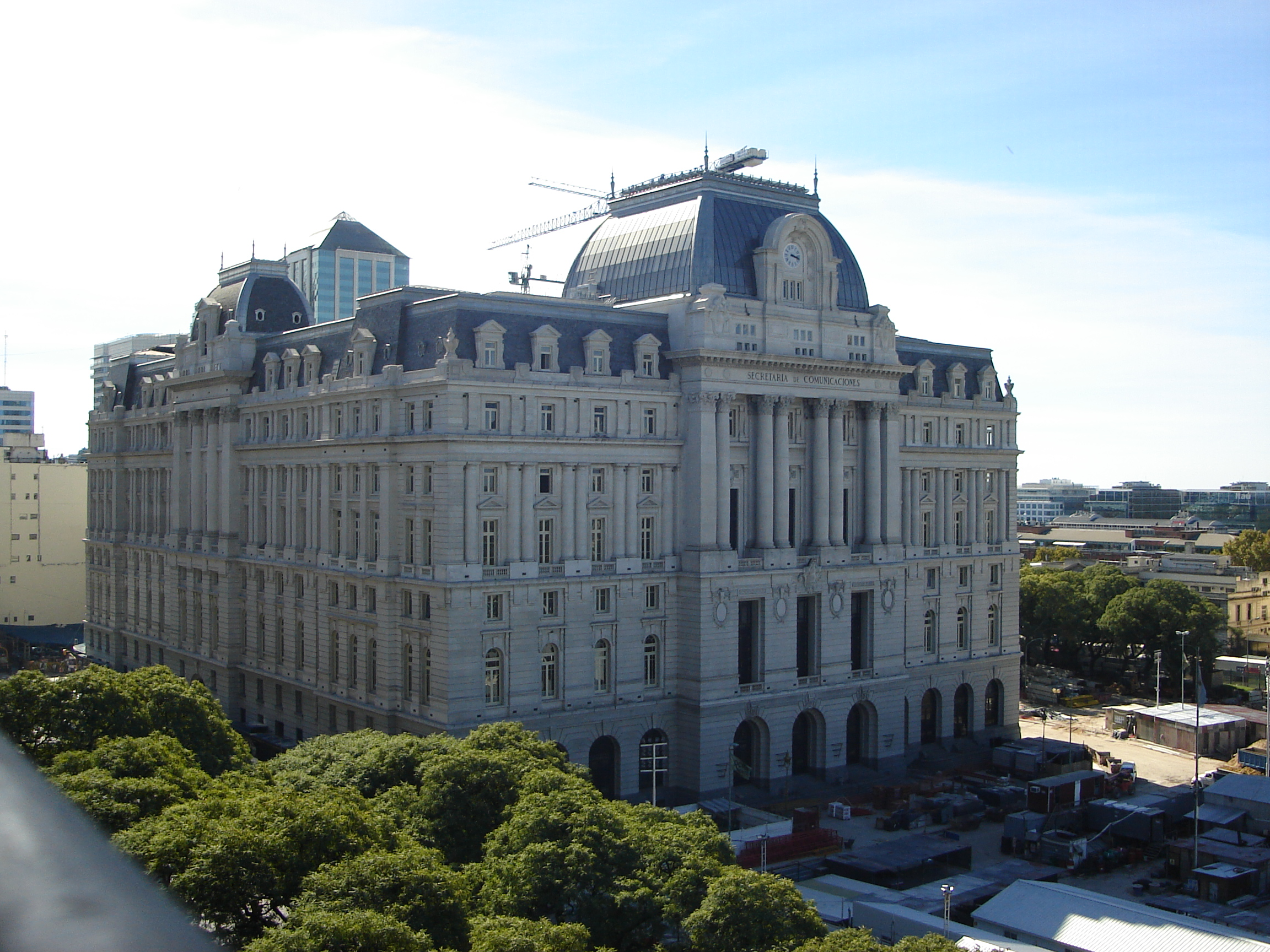
Under construction and restoration in 2012

President Néstor Kirchner proposed the conversion of the abandoned building and landmark into a cultural centre in June 2005, and two years later, plans were approved for the construction of two concert halls and an exhibition gallery for the creation of the Bicentennial Cultural Centre (Centro Cultural del Bicentenario). The centre's winning design was provided by a team of architects led by siblings Enrique, Federico and Nicolás Bares.

It was originally scheduled to be inaugurated on the Argentina Bicentennial, May 25, 2010. Completion of the new centre was delayed considerably, however, and in 2012 its designated name was amended as Centro Cultural del Bicentenario Presidente Dr. Néstor Carlos Kirchner. Upon opening in May 2015 it was named the shorter Centro Cultural Kirchner (English: Kirchner Cultural Centre).

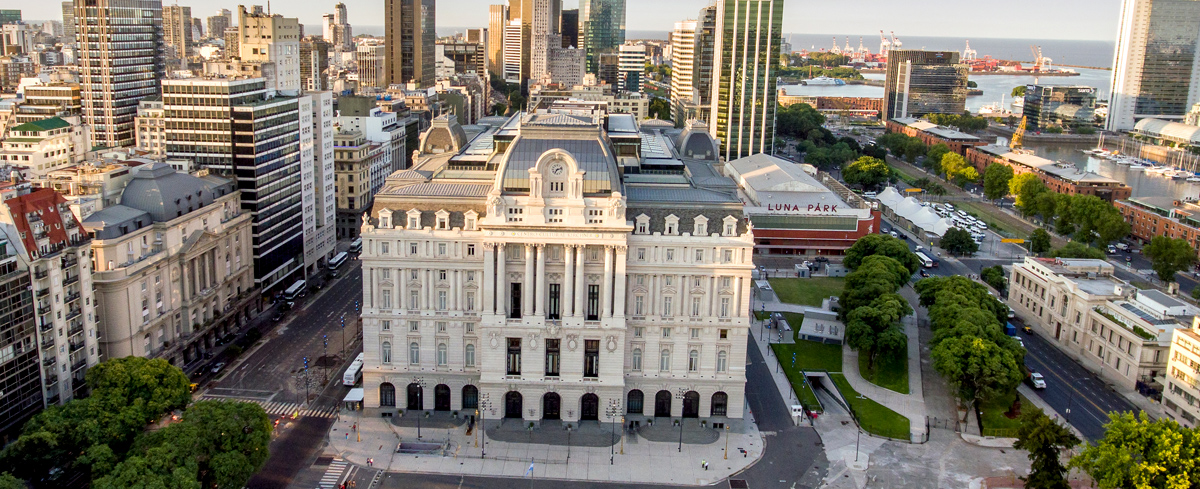
Cultural Center shown in its setting between Buenos Aires Central Business District and Puerto Madero

When the architects added new spaces and elements, they purposely used different materials such as clear and frosted glass and stainless steel, to maintain sight of the ornate Beaux-Arts style beauty of the original building. The main concert hall La Sala Sinfonica (originally named La Ballena Azul, or "The Blue Whale"), seating 1,950 people, is a blimp-shaped three-storey auditorium and opera house floating in the former package-sorting area. It houses a Klais Orgelbau pipe organ (opus 1912), which can be played via a remote console. It has four manuals and about eight thousand pipes. It weighs 30 metric tons and features three 32' stops in pédale registers. The other principal venues are the Sala Federal for music, and La Cúpula and Sala Argentina for live theater.

Since the inauguration of President Mauricio Macri (whose father, Francisco Macri, led a conglomerate that once owned the building), the Centre became part of the newly formed Federal System of Media and Public Contents (Sistema Federal de Medios y Contenidos Publicos) and has sought to de-emphasize its function as a homage to Néstor Kirchner. The centre is now branded simply as "Palacio Libertad" and the room that once housed a memorial display in honour of Kirchner has been dismantled. The Macri administration has intended to change the name of CCK to the "Bicentennial Cultural Centre" (Centro Cultural del Bicentenario). In October 2016, a bill was introduced in Congress to prohibit the federal government from naming facilities after a president who has not been dead for at least 20 years, effectively forcing CCK to be renamed upon passage and enactment of the bill.

The Argentine National Symphony Orchestra, founded by Péron in 1948 but homeless for 67 years, has taken up permanent residency at the Kirchner Centre.

As many as 10,000 patrons a day visit venues and events at the Liberty Centre. Everything is currently free, because the Culture Ministry operates on the assumption that the arts belong to everyone — "We consider culture to be a right" — as said by former minister of culture Teresa Parodi in her interview with the U.S. National Public Radio. Then President of Argentina Mauricio Macri of Argentina assumed the one-year G20 presidency on 30 November 2017, during an official ceremony in Liberty Cultural Centre, for the first time in South America.

In March 2024, the Javier Milei's administration announced that the CCK would change its name. Two months later, the government revealed that the building would be renamed "Palacio Libertad", after considering other names such as Julio Argentino Roca, Jorge Luis Borges, Domingo Faustino Sarmiento, and Bartolomé Mitre. In addition, the national government claimed that Palacio Libertad name was chosen due to it was not related to any political ideas.

On 10 October 2024, the national government officialised the change of name to "Palacio Libertad, Centro Cultural Domingo Faustino Sarmiento". by decree 897/24.

== Gallery ==
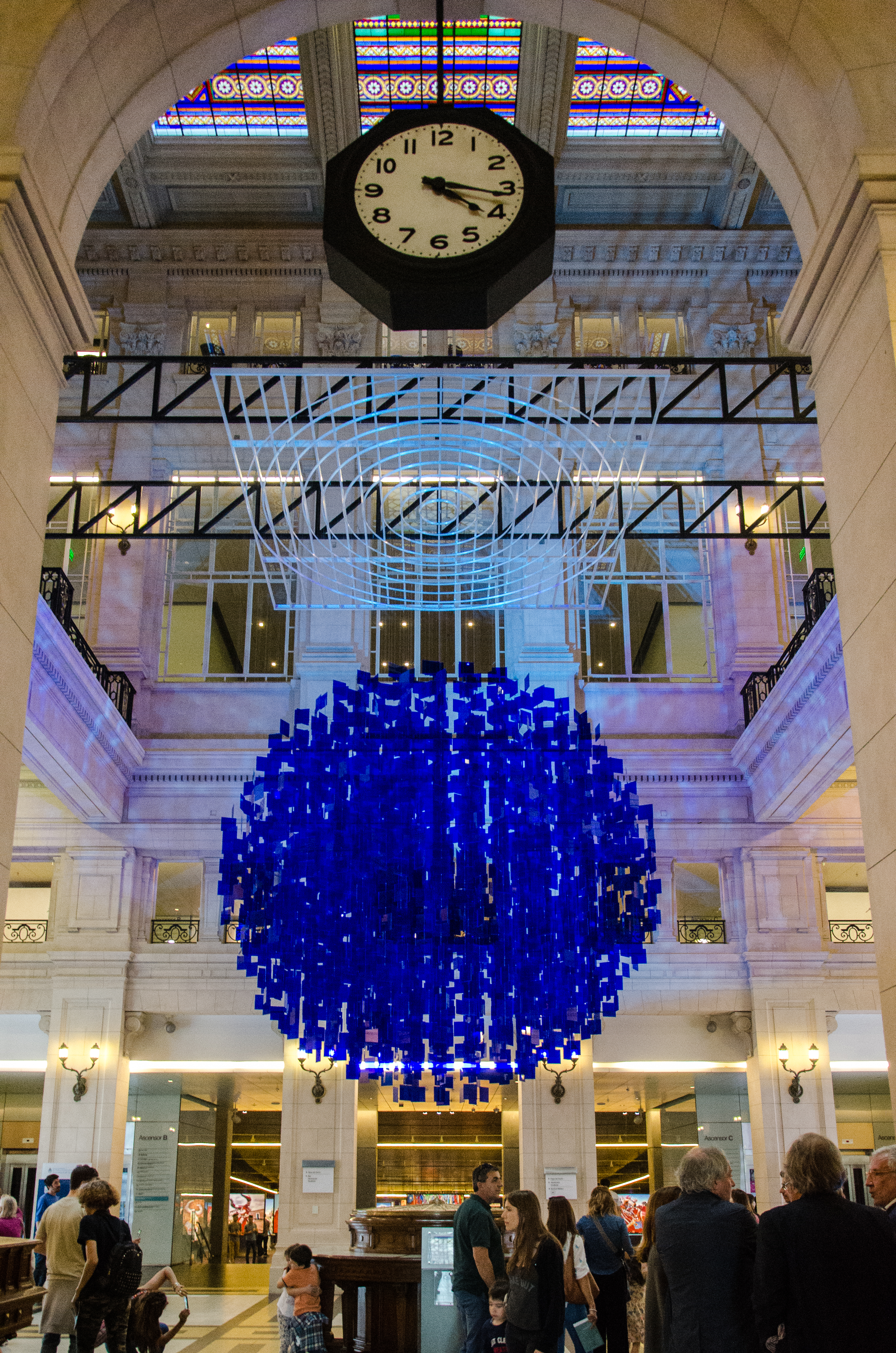
Area Noble

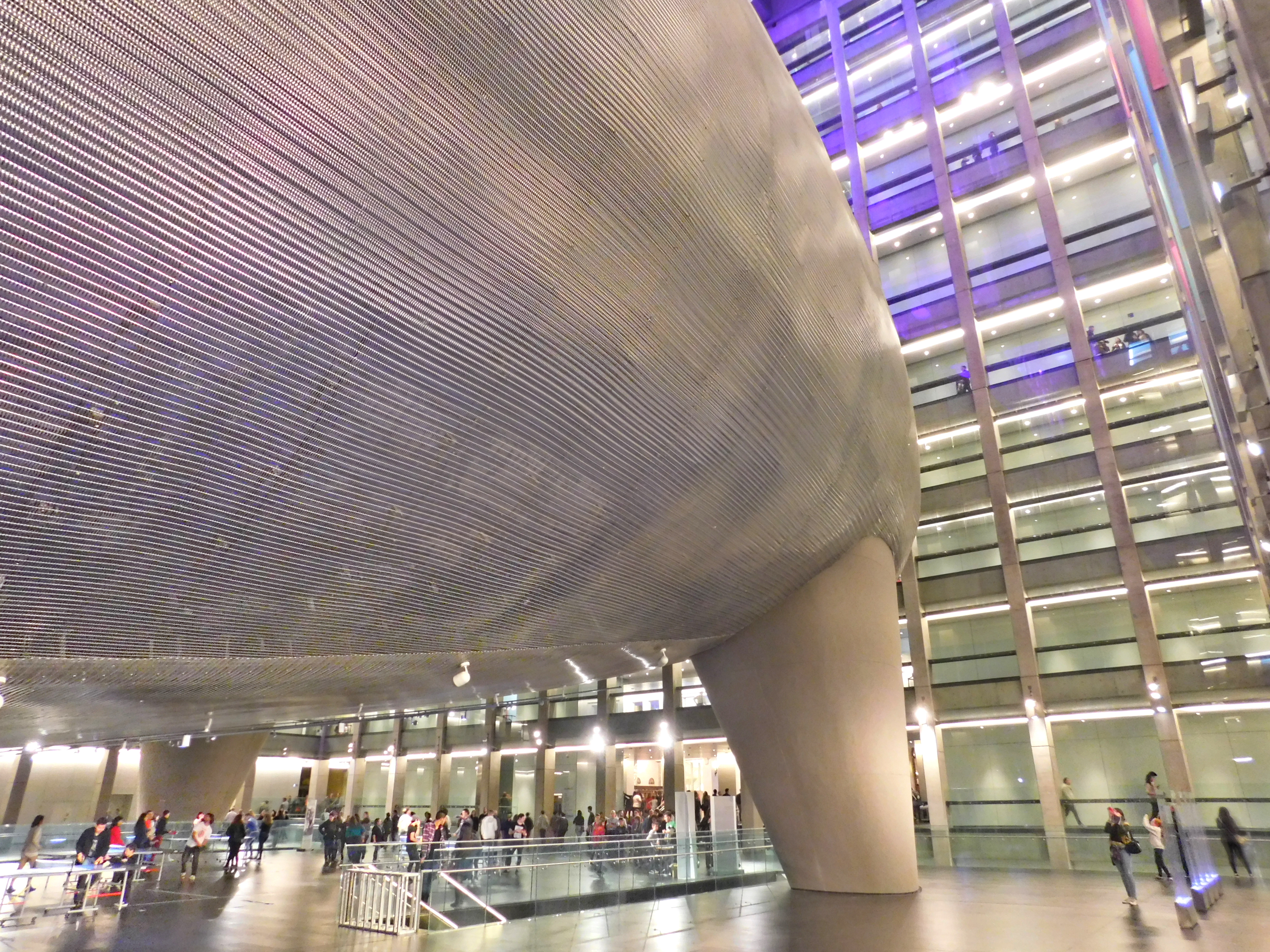
Ballena Azul

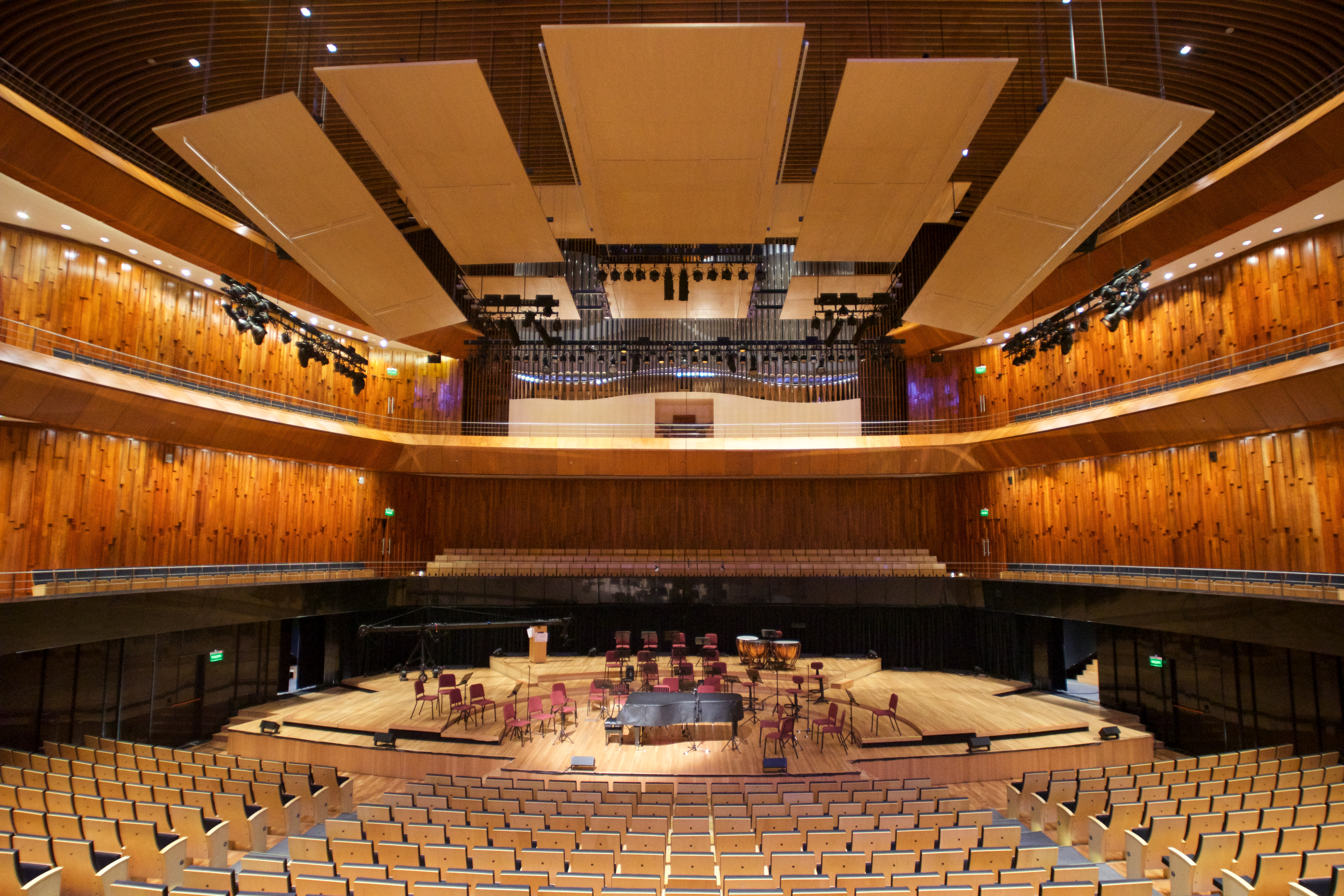
Auditorium

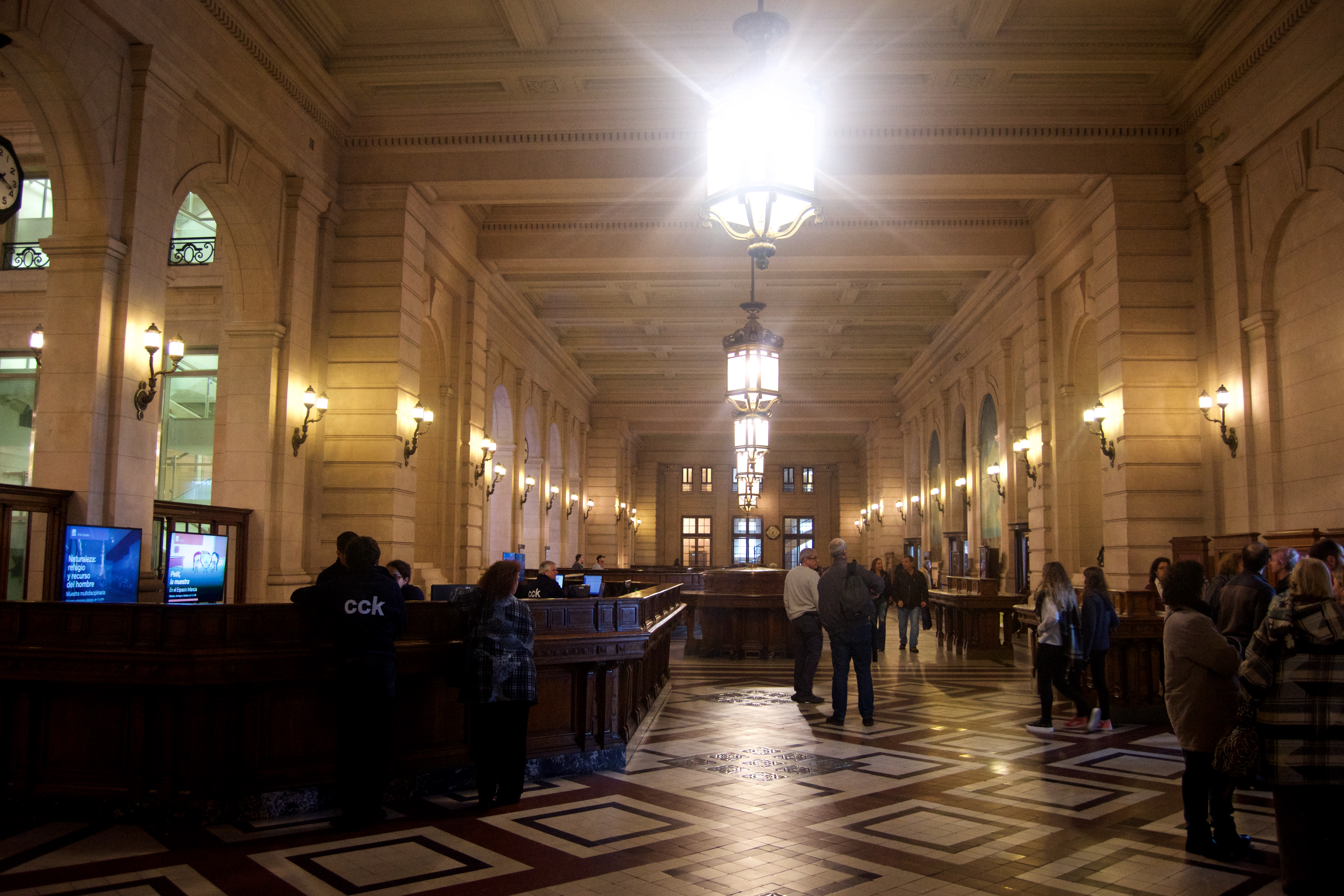
Main hall

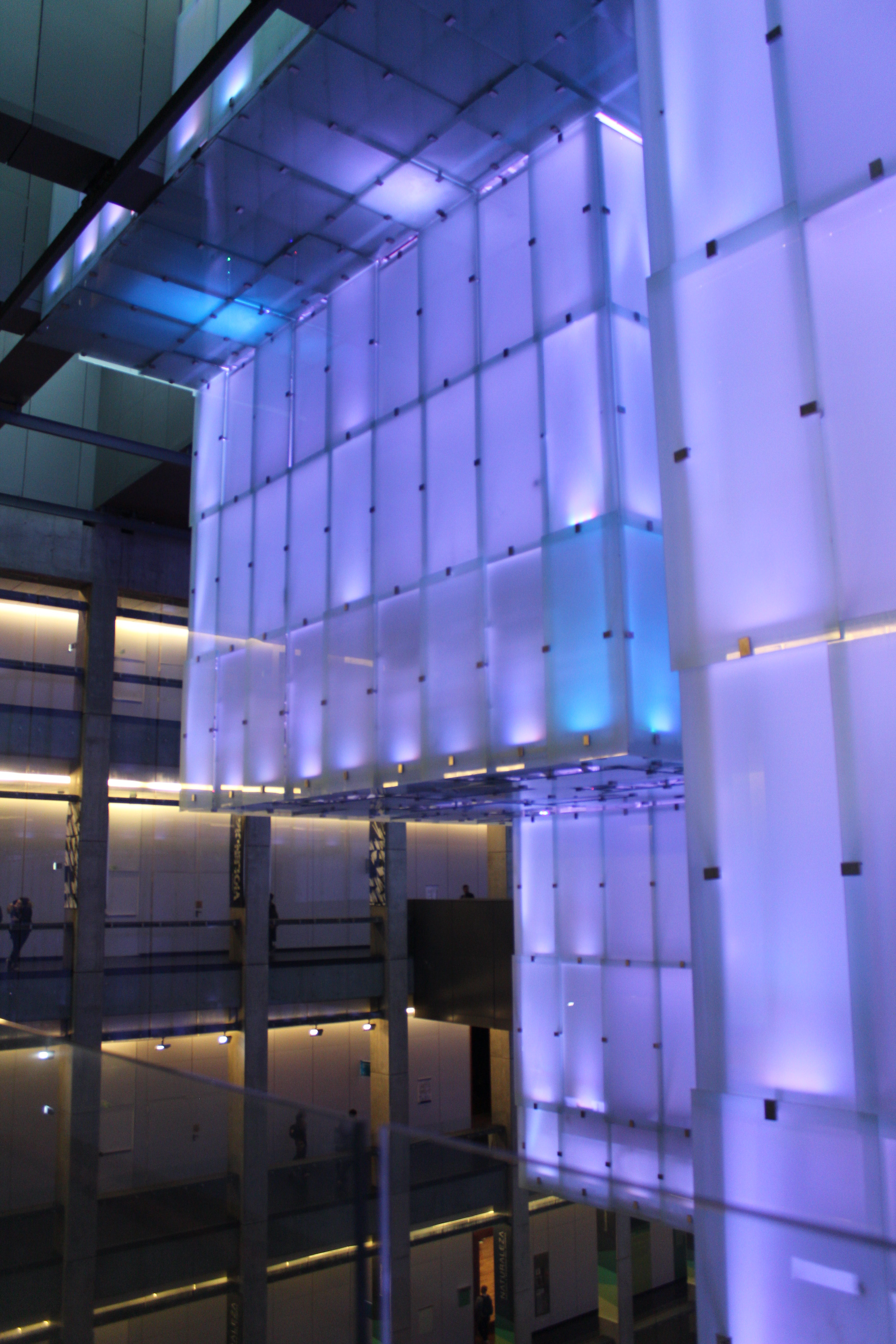
Lamp

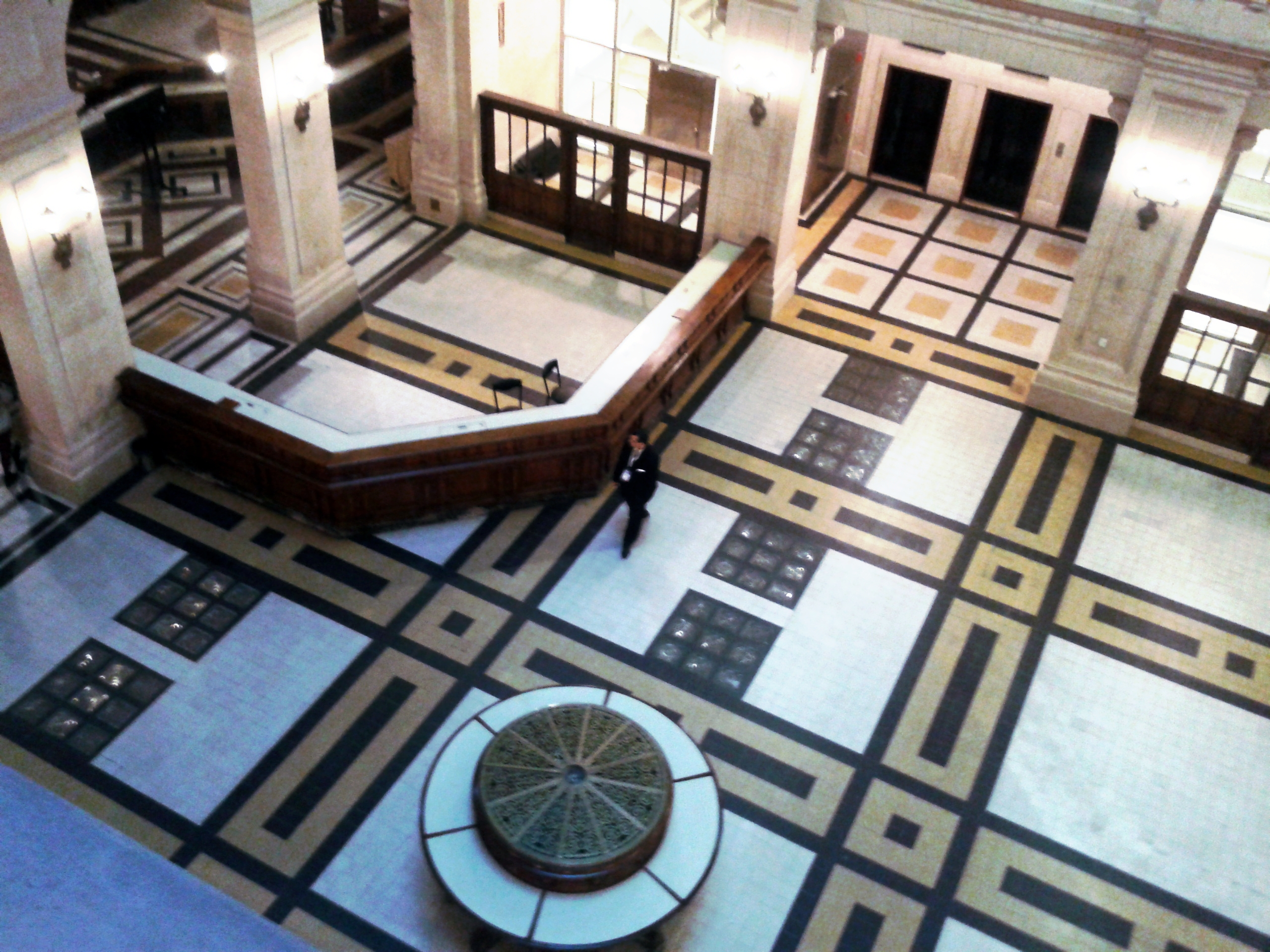
Former post office hall

== See also ==
- Buildings and structures in Buenos Aires
- National Historic Monuments of Argentina
- Teatro Colón
