= Julio Argentino Pascual Roca =

Argentine politician and diplomat

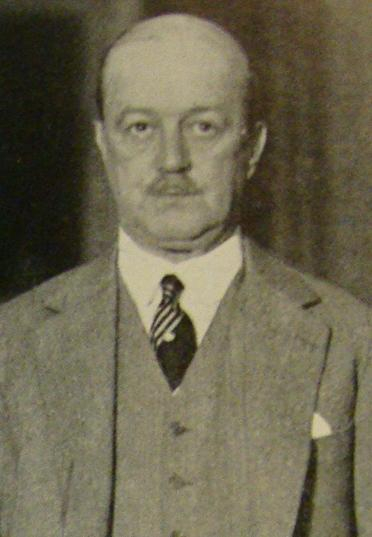

16th Vice President of Argentina
- In office February 20, 1932 – February 20, 1938
- President: Agustín Justo
- Preceded by: Enrique Santamarina
- Succeeded by: Ramón Castillo

Personal details
- Born: May 17, 1873 Córdoba
- Died: October 8, 1942 (aged 69) Buenos Aires
- Party: National Democratic Party
- Profession: Lawyer

Julio Argentino Pascual Roca Funes (17 May 1873 – 8 October 1942) was an Argentine politician and diplomat.

He was born to Clara Funes and General Julio Roca, who would become President of Argentina and dominate national politics for a generation after 1880. Earning a law degree at the University of Buenos Aires in 1895, he served in the Argentine Chamber of Deputies for Córdoba Province from 1904 to 1916, and in the Argentine Senate from 1916 to 1922. He was then elected Governor of Córdoba, serving from 1922 to 1925. The 1931 general elections made him Vice President of Argentina, serving from 1932 to 1938 with President Agustín Justo.

His tenure as Vice President was remembered mainly for his being the co-author of the Roca-Runciman Treaty, signed with Great Britain in February 1933 in order to strengthen the commercial and financial ties between the two countries. Justo's successor, Roberto María Ortiz, appointed Roca Ambassador to Brazil in 1938, and he was named Minister of Foreign Relations in 1940. He retired the following year, and died in Buenos Aires in 1942.

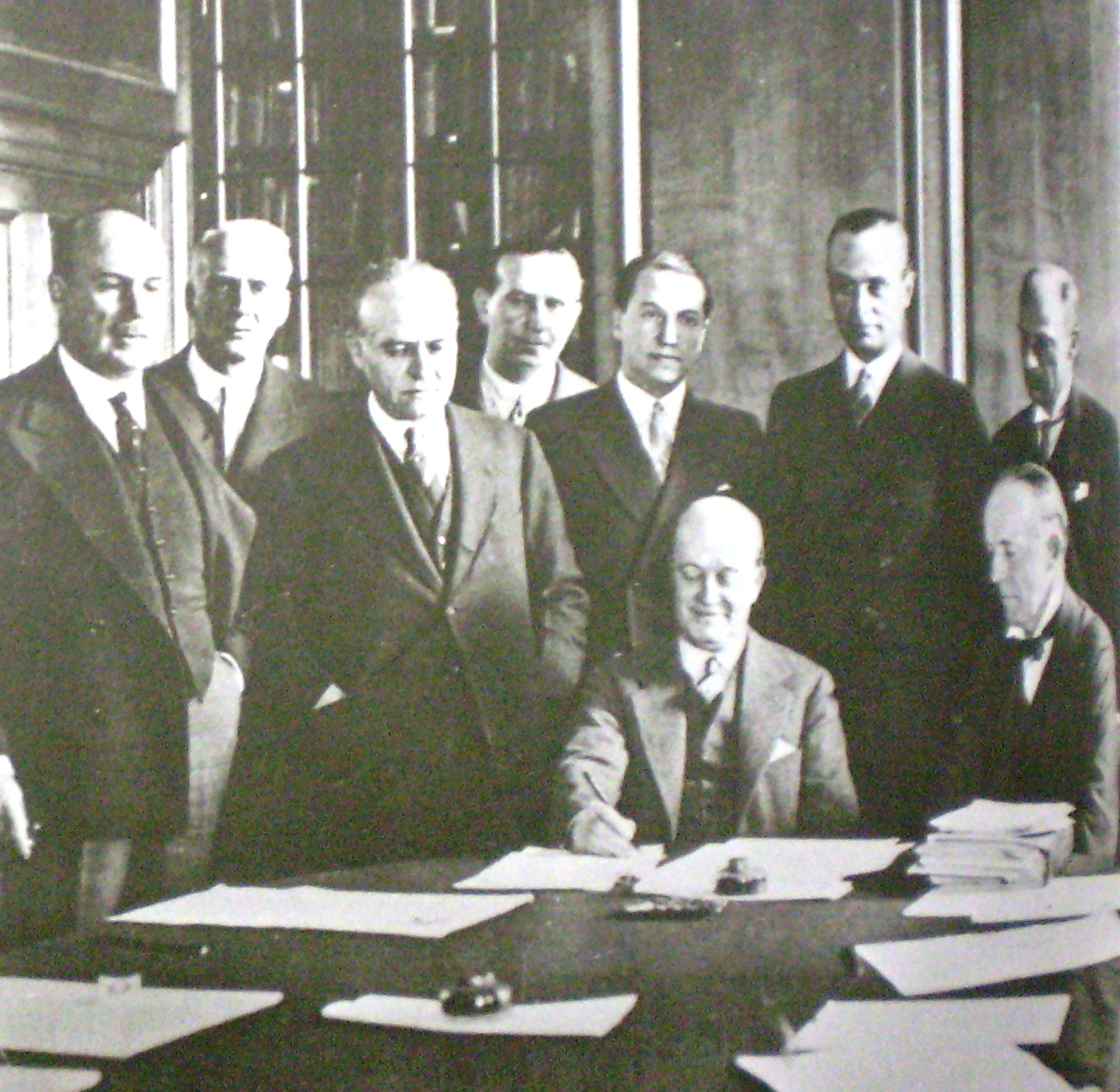
Vice President Roca (seated, second from right) signs the Roca-Runciman Treaty.

Political offices
Preceded by Enrique Santamarina	Vice-President of Argentina; 1932–1938	Succeeded by Ramón Castillo
Preceded by Jerónimo del Barco	Governor of Córdoba; 1928–1930	Succeeded by Ramón J. Cárcano
