= 1st Conference of the Communist Parties of Latin America =

1929 meeting of Latin American communist parties in Buenos Aires, Argentina

The First Conference of the Communist Parties of Latin America was in Buenos Aires, Argentina, June 1–12, 1929. Thirty-eight delegates, representing Argentina, Brazil, Bolivia, El Salvador, Guatemala, Cuba, Colombia, Ecuador, Mexico, Panama, Paraguay, Peru, Uruguay, and Venezuela, took part in the meeting. The only established communist party in the region that did not participate was the Communist Party of Chile, which at time suffered a period of harsh repression under the government of Carlos Ibáñez del Campo.

The conference agreed on an analysis of the Latin American political development, considering that the revolution in Latin America ought to be anti-imperialist, agrarian, and democratic. The conference also committed itself to an accord of solidarity with the Soviet Union.

Organized under the South American Bureau of the Communist International (Comintern), the conference aimed to unify regional strategies under the orthodox line dictated by Moscow's Third Period.

Ronaldo Munck, Rodrigo Vieira Pinnow, and Bernardo Galitelli wrote that the conference "set the 'Third Period' course for Latin American communism as a whole."
