= Francisco López Merino =

Argentine poet

Francisco López Merino (June 6, 1904 - May 22, 1928) was an Argentine poet born in La Plata, Buenos Aires, who committed suicide at the age of 23.

== Career ==
In 1920 he published Horas de amor (Love Hours), a group of nine poems that later fell victims of auto-censorship. In 1921 he wrote another collection of poems entitled Fragmentos de un libro inconcluso (Fragments of an Unfinished Book), divided in three sections: "El espejo de mi interior" ("Mi Inner Mirror"), "Del eterno femenino" ("Of the Eternal Feminine") and "Cantos" ("Chants"). These compositions were never published.

The poem "El alma se me llena de estrellas..." ("My Soul Is Fulfilled By Stars...") was already present in this group of texts and was later included in his book Tono menor (Minor Tone) (1923).

López Merino published his poetry in different national newspapers and magazines, principally in El Día and El Argentino of La Plata, the magazine Crónica Social, of the same city, and El Cronista, a newspaper from Chascomús.

In the magazine Valoraciones, edited by the Faculty of Social and Legal Sciences of the National University of La Plata, he wrote two bibliographic notes: the first one refers to the poetry book El árbol, el pájaro y la fuente (The Tree, the Bird and the Fountain) (1923), by Córdova Iturburu, and the second one deals with the poetry book El imaginero (1927), by Ricardo Molinari.

In 1925 he published his book Las tardes (The Afternoons). The more significant national newspapers (La Nación, La Prensa, La Razón, Crítica, El Día and El Argentino) praised the literary merits of the young writer.

In 1928 the poet committed suicide by gunshot at his temple, in the bathroom of a bar, in La Plata, possibly due to his recent diagnosis with tuberculosis.

== Legacy ==
Merino was memorialized in the 1928 poem, "A Francisco López Merino", by Merino's close friend Jorge Luis Borges.
