= Omar Monza =

Argentine basketball player

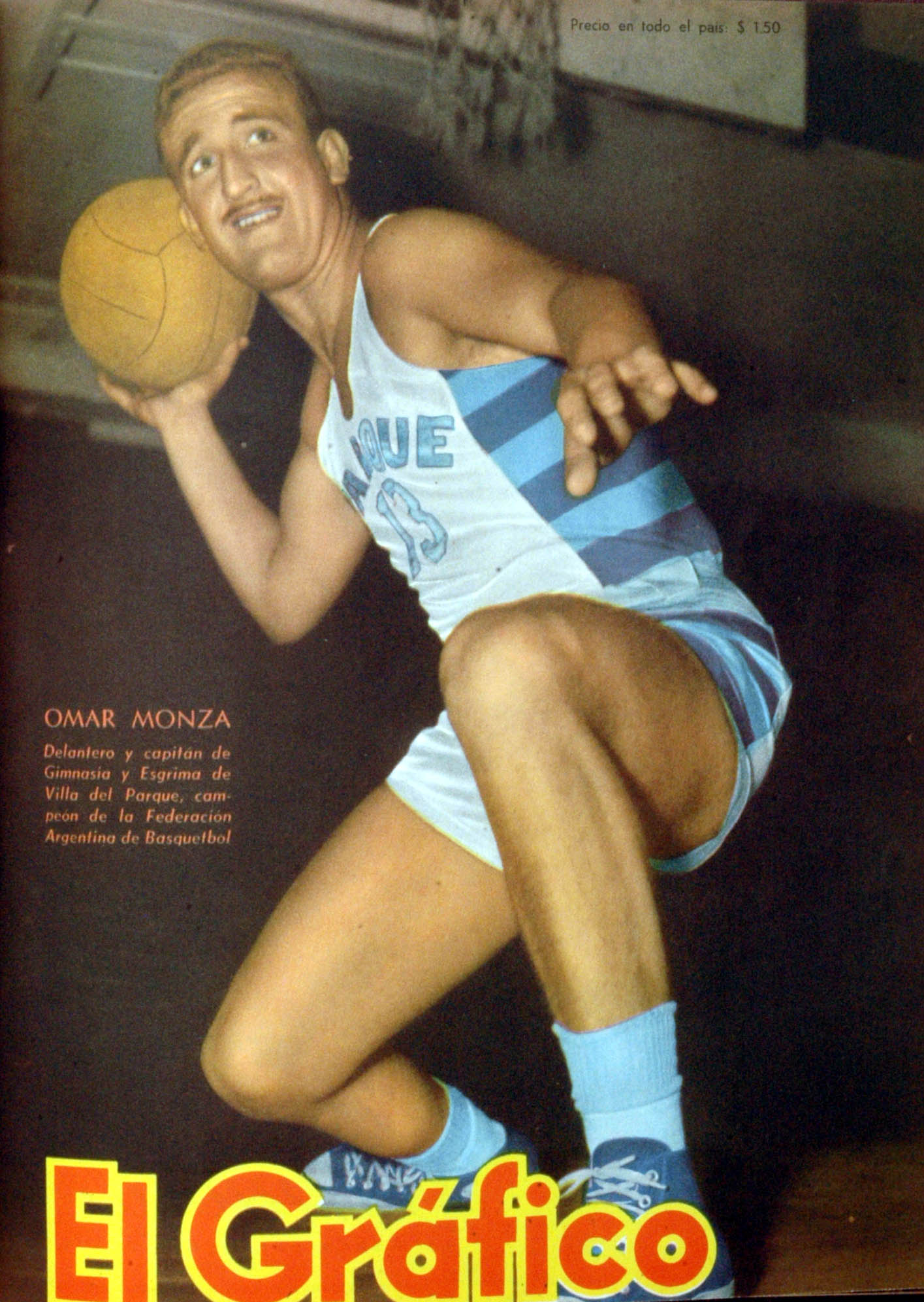
Monza in 1952

Omar Ubaldo Monza Ricciardi (17 February 1929 – 17 June 2017) was an Argentine basketball player who competed in the 1952 Summer Olympics. He retired from basketball in 1955 after athletes were beginning to be persecuted under the Revolución Libertadora dictatorship in Argentina.
