= Correo Argentino =

State-owned postal service of Argentina

Official Post Service of the Argentine Republic
- Correo Oficial de la República Argentina

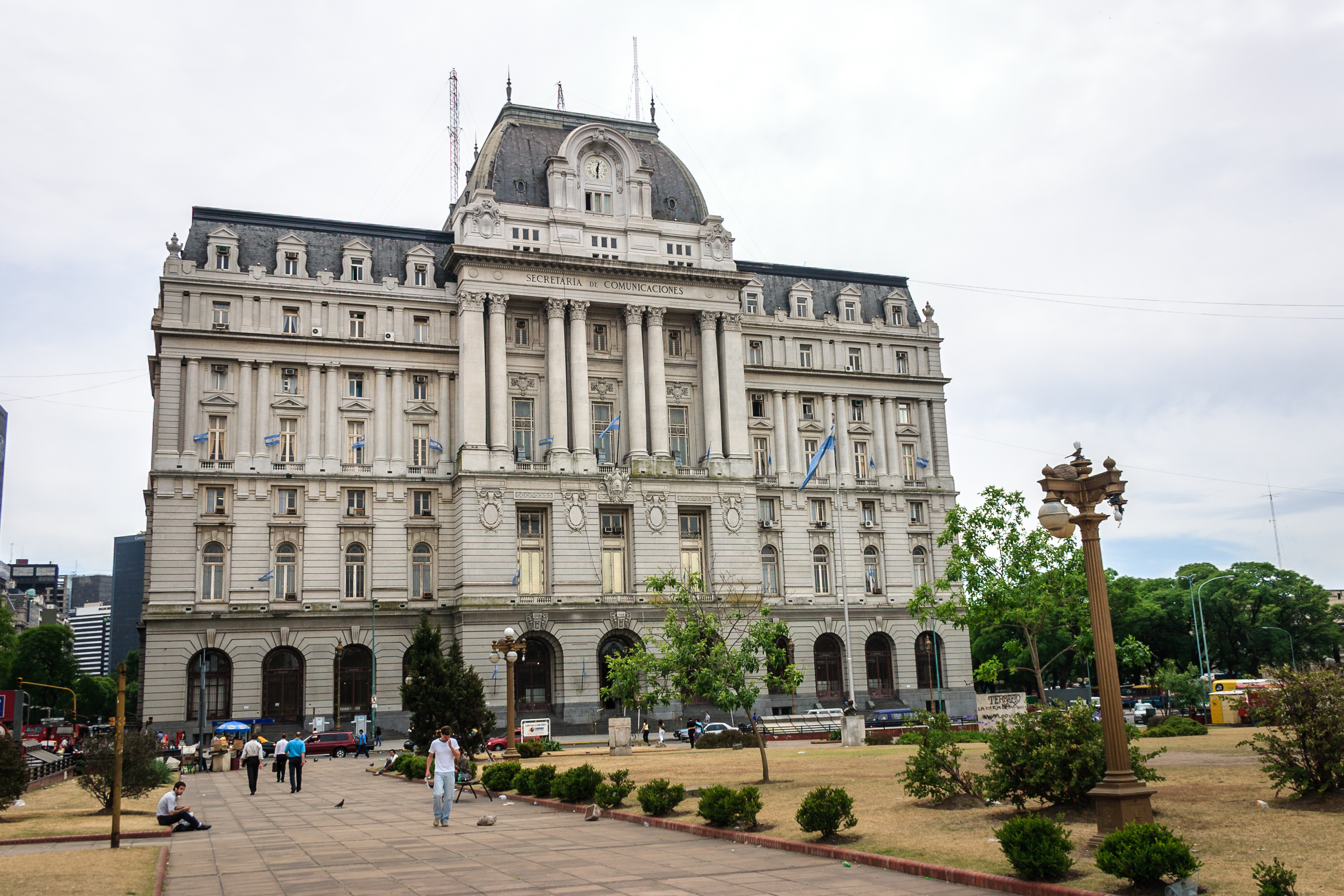
- The Buenos Aires Central Post Office, former seat of Correo Argentino

S.A. overview
- Formed: 1 July 1826; 200 years ago
- Jurisdiction: National
- Headquarters: Edificio French, Buenos Aires
- Motto: Todo lo que das, llega
- Employees: 18,000 (2018)
- Annual budget: A$ 17,752 million
- S.A. executives: Vanesa Piesciorovski, President; Gladys Pestillo, Vice-president & Director
- Parent department: Office of the Cabinet Chief
- Website: correoargentino.com.ar

The Official Post Service of the Argentine Republic (Spanish: Correo Oficial de la República Argentina, mostly known as Correo Argentino since it was privatized in 1997) is the state-owned company that covers the postal service in Argentina. The company is a S.A. under the country's Office of the Cabinet Chief.

== History ==
=== The beginning: Viceroyalty ===
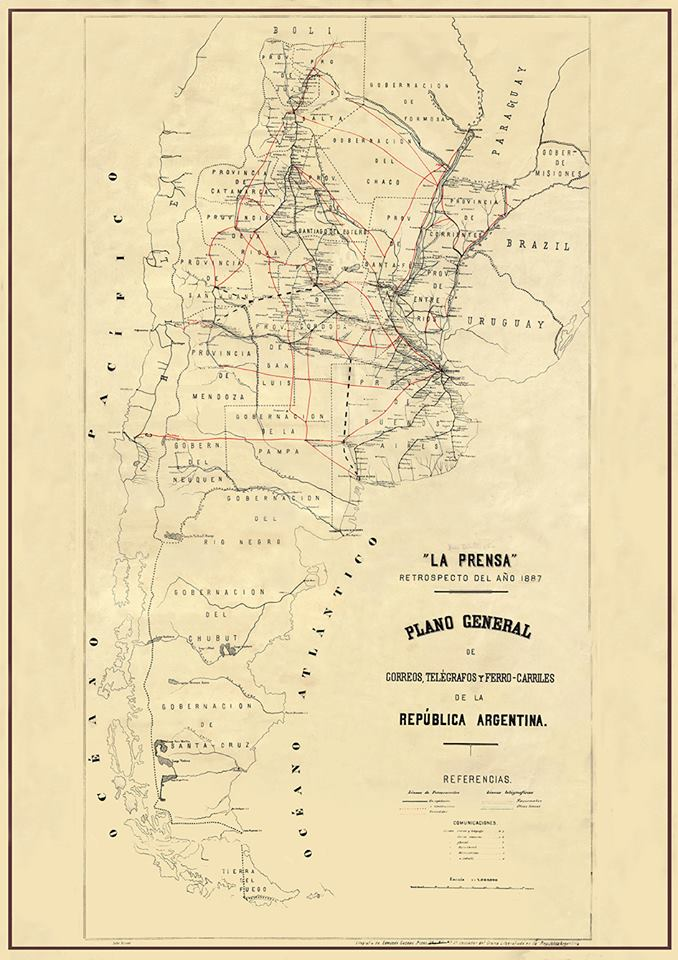
Argentine post network, 1877

On 14 May 1514 the "Correo Mayor de Indias", headquartered in Lima, Peru, was created. Under the mandate of Carlos III of Spain the post service became part of the Viceroyalty of the Río de la Plata depending on the Kingdom of Spain. With the commercial activity increasing considerably, it was decided to create a post service at Buenos Aires. Domingo Basavilbaso made the arrangements to establish a post service in the region. It would be managed by a senior lieutenant designed by the head office at Lima.

On 1 July 1769, the service began its activities officially. Through the years it extended to the cities of Potosí and Santiago (Chile). Bruno Ramírez was the first postman of Argentine post, when the profession did not still exist in the country. Ramírez officially became post employee on 14 September 1771. Years later that would be promulgated as the Day of Postman in Argentina.

=== Evolution ===
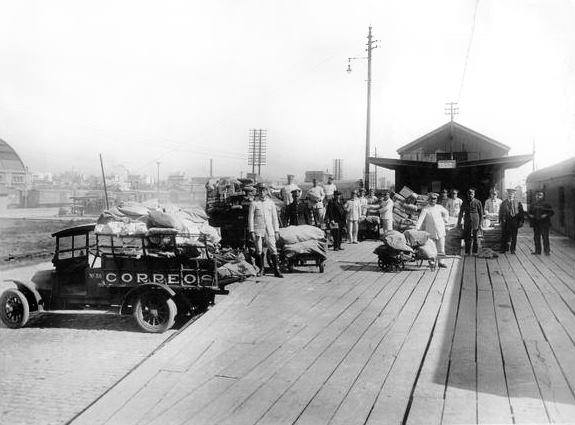
Employees of the post service and their vehicles, c. 1910

Post service in Argentina played a key role during the May Revolution because of orders and reports from the Primera Junta were distributed through letters. The first manager of the service was Melchor de Albín, designed in June 1810.

In 1826, during the presidency of Bernardino Rivadavia, the service was nationalised by a Law passed by the Congress of Provincias Unidas del Río de la Plata. Since then, the post service was named "Dirección General de Correos, Postas y Caminos", with Juan Manuel de Luca in charge. De Luca remained during 32 years, being succeeded by Gervasio Antonio de Posadas. It was Posadas who placed the first post boxes in the city of Buenos Aires, wrote the rules for postmen and established lower prices for post rates.

Eduardo Olivera was chosen as director in 1874 replacing Posadas. Olivera wrote the new rules and sent a project for the Law of renew of post services, n° 816. During successive administrations, money orders, courier services, registered letters and declared values were implemented. After being an agency depending on the Ministries of Finances and Interior, in June 1944 the Government of Argentina established the post service autonomy, naming it "Dirección General de Correos y Telecomunicaciones" (National Direction of Post and Telecommunication)

=== Palacio de Correos ===
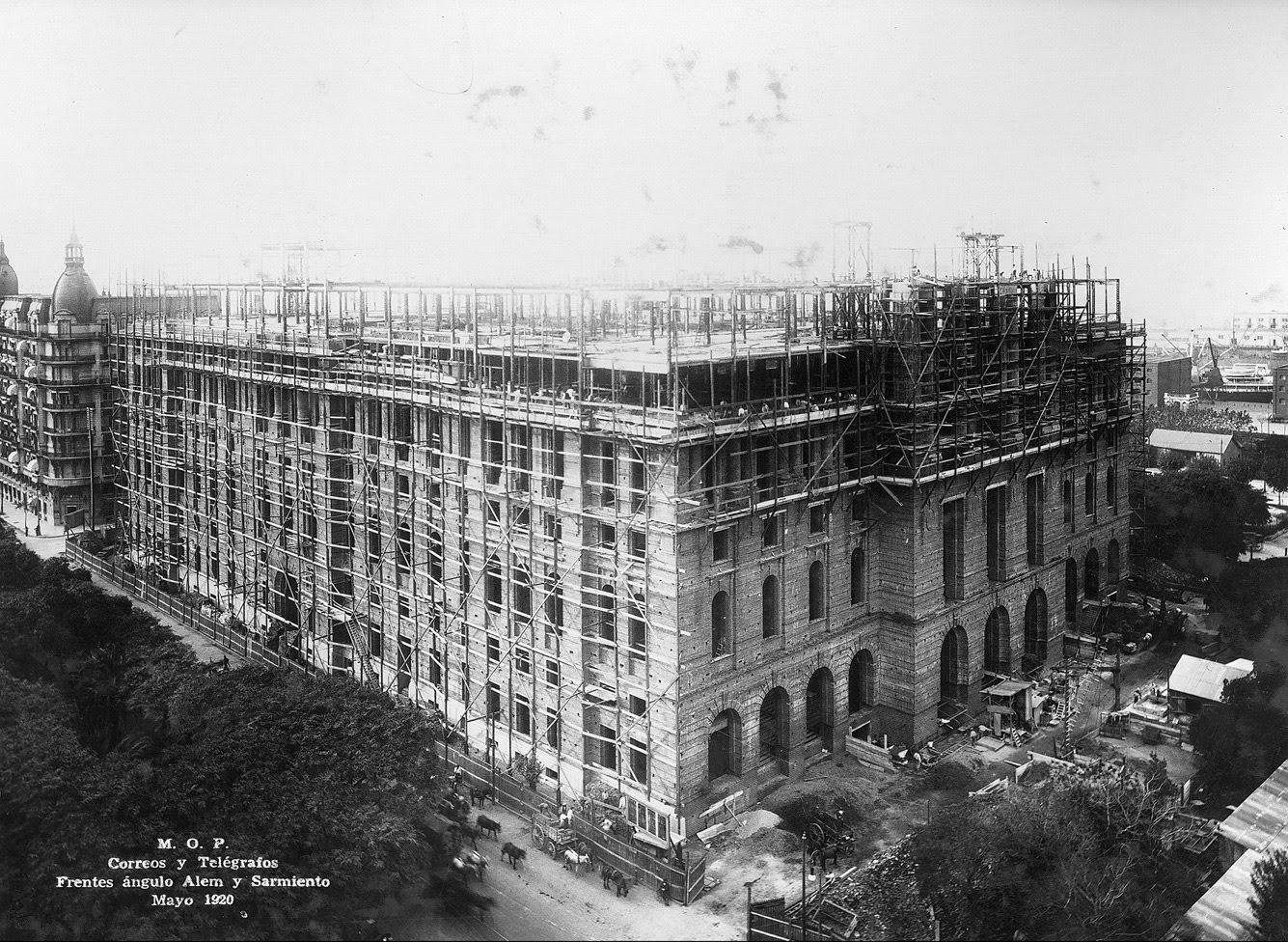
The Central Post Office Palace in 1920

Due to the increasing demand for post services in Argentina, in 1888 the Post Office director, Ramón Cárcano, proposed a specific building as seat for the postal service. French architect Norbert-Auguste Maillart designed the building, inspiring in the City Hall Post Office of New York City.

Works started in 1889, not being finished until 1928 when the building was officially inaugurated by president of Argentina Marcelo T. de Alvear.

=== ENCoTel ===
The "Empresa Nacional de Correos y Telégrafos" (ENCoTel) (in English: "Post and Telegraph National Company") was a state-owned company established in 1972 for post, telegraph and money services. During the National Reorganisation Process started in 1976, private companies were allowed to take part in post services, although the universal post services continued being managed by the state post.

=== Privatisation ===
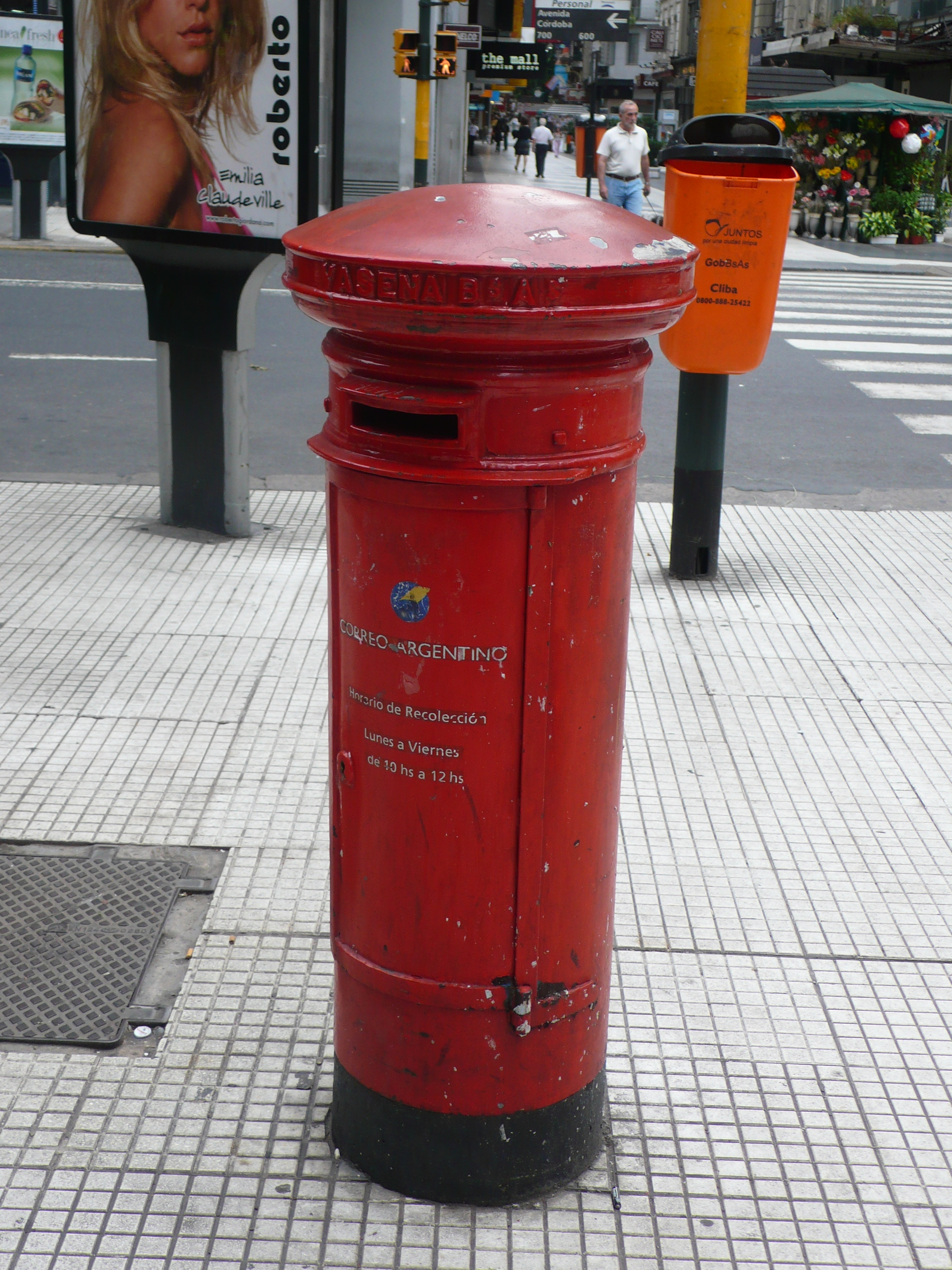
Post box with the logo of Correo Argentino in Buenos Aires, 2008

In 1997, during the Carlos Menem administration, ENCoTel was privatised. The service was granted in concession to "Correo Argentino", a company part of Sociedad Macri (SOCMA), owned by businessman Franco Macri. In that way, Argentina became one of the first countries to privatise its post service. The contract of concession set a term of 30 years, also establishing that SOCMA would pay a six-monthly rent of A$ 51.6 million to the state. Nevertheless, the consortium built up a debt of nearly US$900 million to private creditors and the state as well. In September 2001, SOCMA entered into a reorganization proceeding.

The Palacio de Correos was declared National Heritage by Law 12,665 in 1997. considering its architectural style and historic relevance. In 2002 the building ceased operations as seat of Correo Argentino. Only a small part of the building continued its activities as a post office and sale of stamps, on Sarmiento street. The rest of the building became inactive until became the Kirchner Cultural Centre in 2015.

=== Renationalization ===
The Kirchner administration decided in 2003 that Correo Argentino would go back to state administration for 180 days, while a new private administrator would be sought for in an international public bid. In 2004, the re-privatization plan was halted, and a new state-owned S.A. corporation was created: Correo Oficial de la República Argentina Sociedad Anónima. In 2005, the concession was officially taken from Macri. Franco Macri, a supporter of the Kirchner administration, claimed he received an unworthy treatment during the process.

== See also ==
- Buenos Aires Central Post Office
- Kirchner Cultural Centre
- Postal codes in Argentina
- Communications in Argentina
- Postal Union of the Americas, Spain and Portugal
- Universal Postal Union
