= Jaime Rest =

Argentine translator, literary critic, writer, and teacher

Jaime Rest (July 2, 1927 – November 8, 1979) was an Argentine translator, literary critic, writer and teacher.

== See also ==
- Argentine literature
