= 1927 in Argentine football =

Football in Argentina
- Season: 1927

1927 in Argentine football saw both leagues reunified under the name "Asociación Amateurs Argentina de Football". The championship was won by San Lorenzo obtaining its 3rd. title.

Sportivo Barracas returned to Primera División, while Sportivo Almagro changed its name to "Almagro".

== Primera División ==
Pos	Team	Pts	G	W	D	L	Gf	Ga	Dif
1	San Lorenzo	57	33	26	5	2	86	26	+60
2	Boca Juniors	56	33	25	6	2	79	22	+57
3	Lanús	50	33	22	6	5	52	25	+27
4	Ferro Carril Oeste	47	33	19	9	5	58	36	+22
5	Huracán	44	33	18	8	7	58	28	+30
6	Independiente	44	33	20	4	9	65	39	+26
7	Racing Club	41	33	18	5	10	66	42	+22
8	Sportivo Palermo	41	33	17	7	9	50	34	+16
9	Sportivo Barracas	41	33	17	7	9	56	39	+17
10	River Plate	40	33	17	6	10	53	35	+18
11	Estudiantes (LP)	40	33	15	10	8	69	46	+23
12	Quilmes	39	33	16	7	10	62	48	+24
13	Argentino de Quilmes	36	33	14	8	11	55	45	+10
14	Platense	36	33	14	8	11	40	46	-6
15	Chacarita Juniors	35	33	11	13	9	57	48	+9
16	San Fernando	35	33	12	11	10	55	48	+7
17	Banfield	32	33	13	6	14	45	47	-2
18	Argentinos Juniors	32	33	11	10	12	38	40	-2
19	Barracas Central	31	33	11	9	13	54	56	-2
20	Sportivo Buenos Aires	31	33	13	5	15	46	50	-4
21	Almagro	30	33	11	8	14	38	34	-4
22	Liberal Argentino	27	33	9	9	15	40	47	-7
23	Talleres (RE)	27	33	10	9	14	30	38	-8
24	Vélez Sarsfield	27	33	11	5	17	42	62	-20
25	Gimnasia y Esgrima (LP)	25	33	8	9	16	40	57	-17
26	Argentino del Sud	24	33	9	6	18	42	67	-25
27	Estudiantil Porteño	23	33	9	5	19	43	62	-19
28	Excursionistas	22	33	8	6	19	40	69	-29
29	Atlanta	22	33	8	6	19	28	50	-22
30	Defensores de Belgrano	21	33	8	5	20	30	51	-21
31	Tigre	21	33	9	3	21	35	76	-41
32	San Isidro	20	33	6	8	19	39	80	-41
33	Estudiantes (BA)	19	33	5	9	19	22	51	-29
34	Porteño	4	33	1	2	30	24	93	-69

== Lower divisions ==
=== Primera B ===
- Champion: El Porvenir (promoted to Primera along with Argentino de Banfield

=== Primera C ===
- Champion: Unión de Caseros

== International cups ==
=== Copa Dr. Ricardo Aldao ===
- Champion: San Lorenzo

==== Final ====
30 December 1928

Rampla Juniors (Uruguay)	0-1	(Argentina) San Lorenzo

Montevideo

== Argentina national team ==
Argentina won its 3rd. Copa América title, tournament held by Peru.

The national team also won the Copa Newton defeating Uruguay 1–0 at Montevideo.
