= Buenos Aires Central Post Office =

Historic building in Argentina

- Correo Central de Buenos Aires
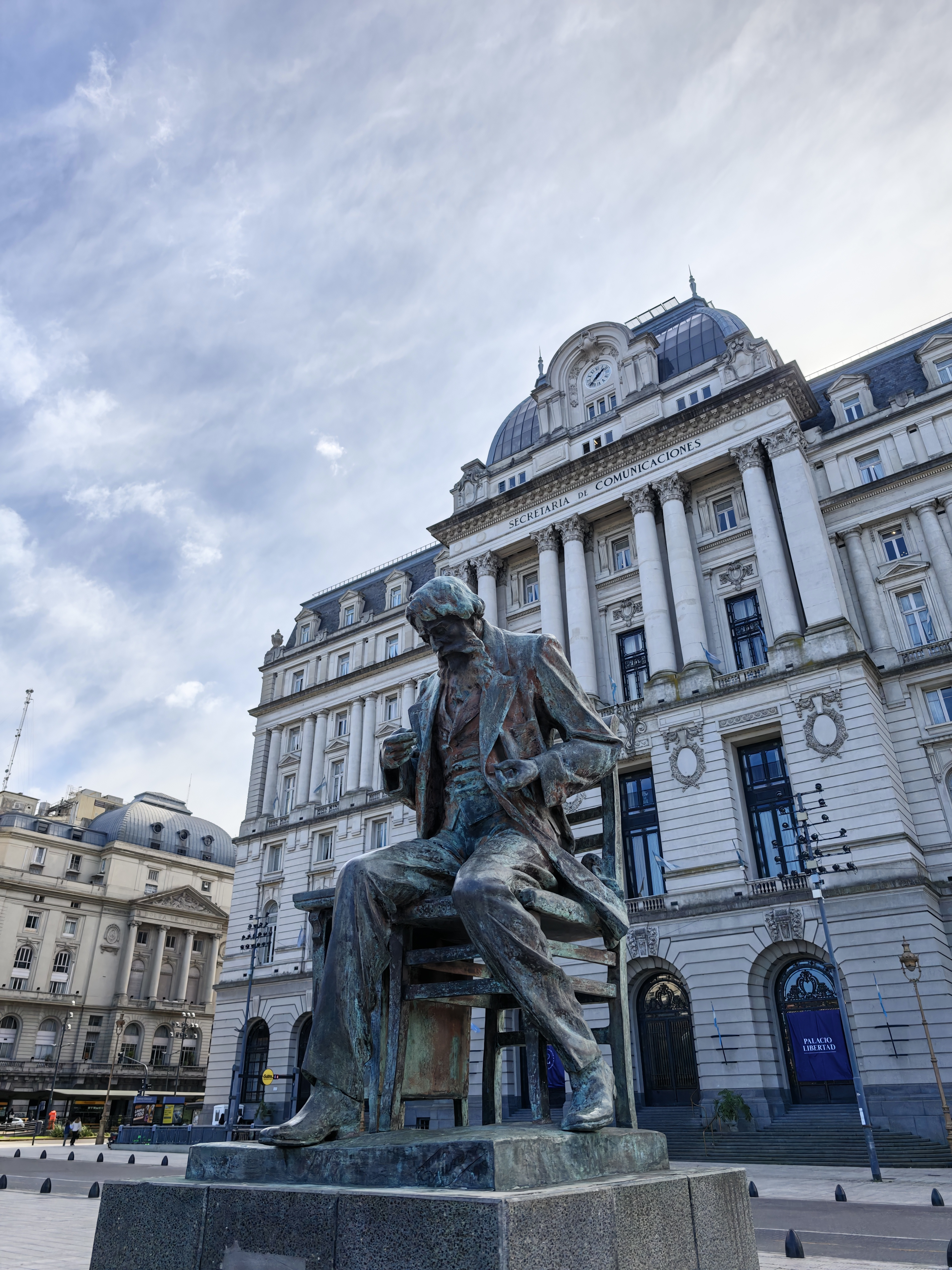
- The building with the Samuel Morse statue in the foreground.
- Interactive map of the Buenos Aires Central Post Office area

General information
- Location: Buenos Aires, Argentina
- Construction started: 1889
- Inaugurated: 1928; 98 years ago
- Renovated: 2015; 11 years ago
- Owner: Government of Argentina

Height
- Height: 60 m (200 ft)

Technical details
- Floor area: 88,050 m^{2} (947,800 sq ft)

Design and construction
- Architect: Norbert Maillart

National Historic Monument of Argentina

The Buenos Aires Central Post Office (Spanish: Correo Central de Buenos Aires, also known as the Palacio de Correos y Telecomunicaciones) building, now the "Palacio Libertad", was the seat of the Correo Argentino (Argentine Post Office Department) until 2002. It is located in the San Nicolás, Buenos Aires neighborhood of Buenos Aires, Argentina. The building was designed in the Neoclassical Beaux-Arts style and with Second Empire style elements by French architect Norbert Maillart.

Construction started in 1899, and after several long pauses and changes to Maillart's original design, was finally opened in 1928.

The Palacio de Correos was declared National Heritage in 1997 due to its architectural style, historical relevance and the artworks inside the building. It ceased activities as a post office in 2002 and two years later the National Government called a tender to turn the building into a cultural centre as part of the celebrations to commemorate the 200th anniversary of May Revolution. The first name chosen was "Centro Cultural del Bicentenario", changing to "Néstor Kirchner Cultural Centre" in 2012.

The Central Post Office building, after extensive renovations, construction, and restoration, which opened in May 2015. It is the largest cultural center in Latin America, and 4th largest in the world.

== History ==
=== Original project ===
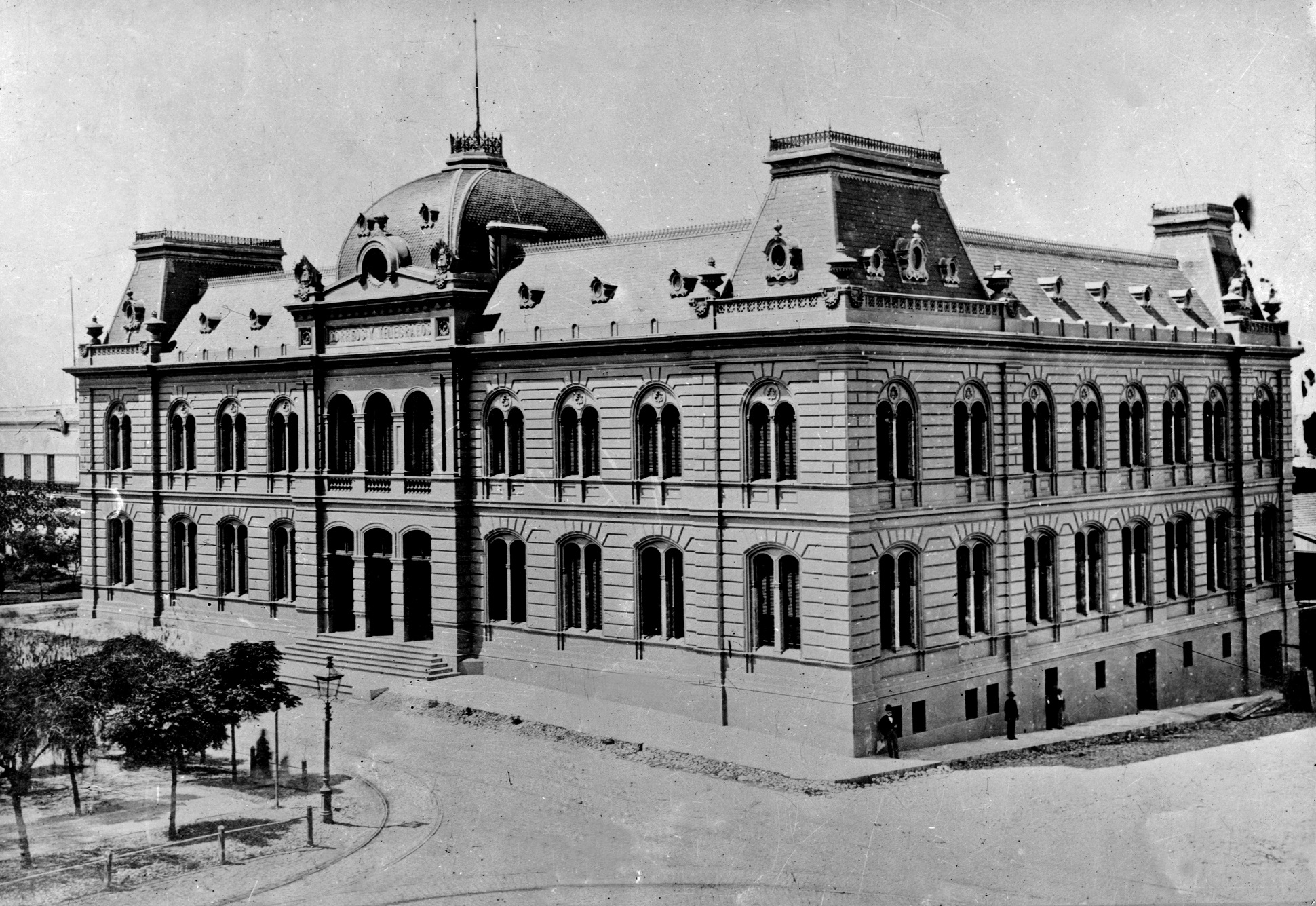
The former post office building (c. 1873), currently part of Casa Rosada

Due to the increasing demand for post services in Argentina, in 1888 the Post Office director, Ramón Cárcano, proposed a specific building as seat for the Postal Service. The Ministry of Public Works hired French architect Norbert-Auguste Maillart to design the building and carry out the project. Maillart's concept building was based on the City Hall Post Office of New York City.

Once the project received approval from the president Miguel Juárez Celman, Maillart started works in 1889 on land given by the society Las Catalinas, sited on the block among Leandro N. Alem Ave., Corrientes Ave., Bouchard and Sarmiento streets. Works were interrupted in 1890 because of the economic crash that caused the fall of president Juárez Celman.

=== Modifications ===
It was not until 1905 when the National government released funds to finish the building. Many years had passed and the original project by Maillart involved a smaller building became obsolete due to the increasing demand for postal services. Therefore, the post director Ernesto Bosch, proposed a new design for the building and Maillart was hired again in 1908 to carry out the new project.

Unlike the previous project, the new building would have an entrance on Sarmiento street. To facilitate access to building for people, it was planned to build bridges and pedestrian areas, installed on arches and columns that would join the upper border of the 25 de Mayo street with the entrances of the building. Besides, inclined planes would be placed to connect those streets with Leandro N. Alem avenue. Some surrounding buildings, such as the Stock Exchange of Buenos Aires and the Calvet Building were constructed according to that project that finally was never carried out.

=== Final version ===
In 1911 Maillart retired from the project in disagreement with the authorities. The National Direction of Architecture appointed Maillart's main collaborator, Russian Jacques Spolsky to continue the project. Spolsky had already designed the Palacio de Correos of Tucumán and its homonym of Rosario.

After Spolsky was designated the original project was significantly modified. Some of the changes included a metallic structure and the use of materials such as cement. Due to the land having been reclaimed from the Río de la Plata, it was necessary to sink 2,882 10 m (33 ft) concrete piles to avoid problems with the foundations.

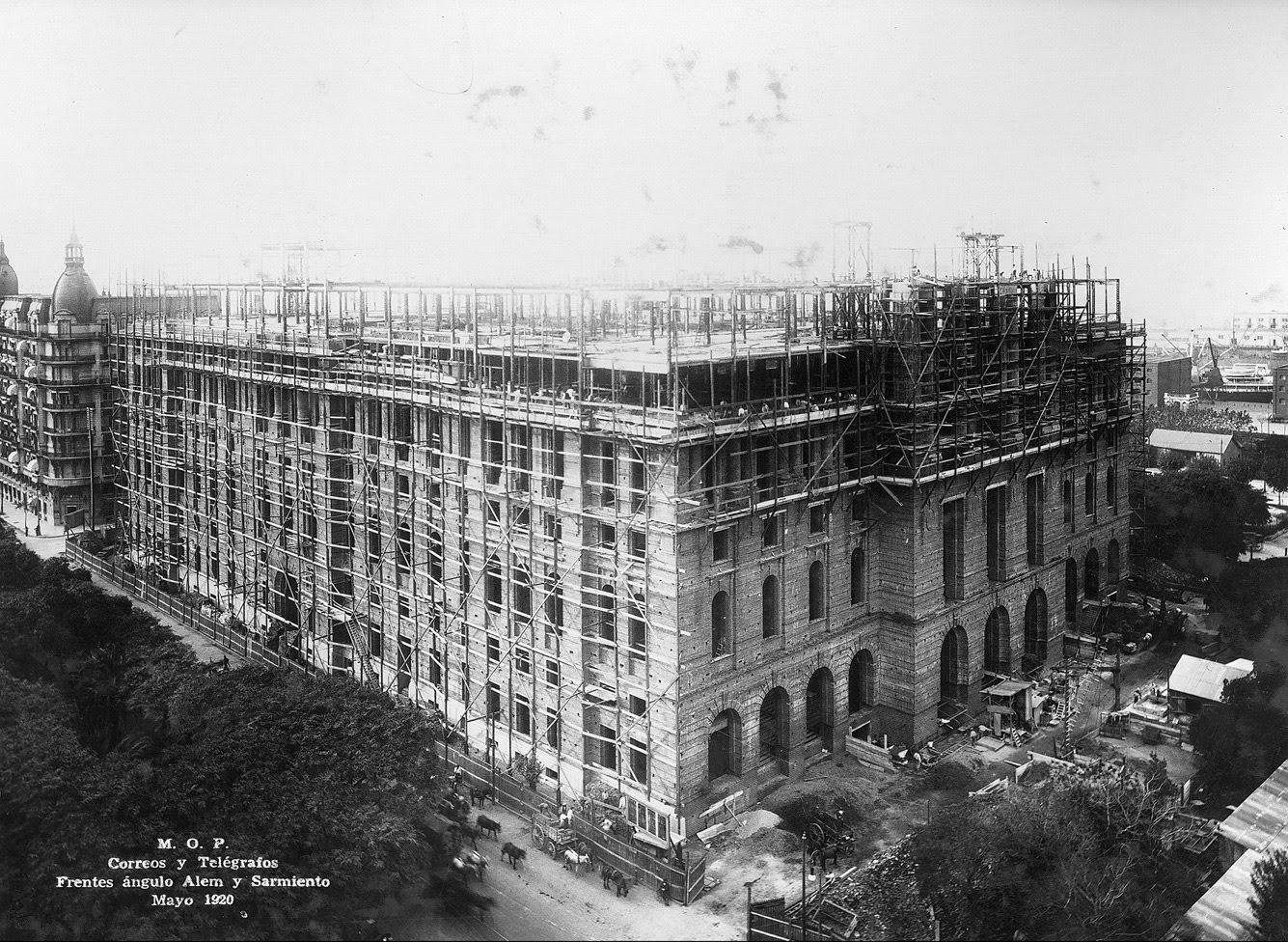
The building under construction, 1920

In 1916, one year after the company hired for the construction of the building transferred the contract to Public Works General Company, the executive authority suspended the construction of the bridges and inclined planes due to the economic crisis and the lack of materials due to the World War I. As a result, some concepts of the palace had to be changed. The picture windows on the second floor (Sarmiento street side) had been originally conceived as entrances, therefore mezzanines were added while some floors were demolished to convert first and second basements into main hall entrances, putting the windows there.

Funds ran out in 1923 so a new law was promulgated to grant new funds, while works were awarded to a new company. The building was finally inaugurated on September 28, 1928, two weeks before then president of Argentina Marcelo T. de Alvear finished his term.

During the first terms of president Juan Perón, he and his wife Eva Perón had their offices at the Buenos Aires Central Post Office. The Eva Perón Foundation also used the building as its headquarters. In 1997, the Palacio de Correos was declared National Historic Monument by Law 12,665, considering its architectural style and historic relevance. In 2002 the building ceased operations as seat of Correo Argentino. Only a small part of the building continued its activities as a post office and sale of stamps, on Sarmiento Street.

== See also ==
- Libertad Palace
- Correo Argentino
- Buildings and structures in Buenos Aires
- National Historic Monuments of Argentina
