= Enrique Santamarina =

Argentinian politician

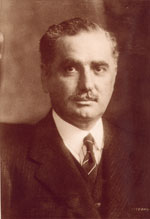

15th Vice President of Argentina
- In office September 6, 1930 – October 20, 1930
- President: José Félix Uriburu
- Preceded by: Enrique Martínez
- Succeeded by: Julio Argentino Pascual Roca

Personal details
- Born: February 8, 1870 Tandil, Buenos Aires Province
- Died: April 18, 1937 (aged 67) Buenos Aires

Enrique Santamarina (February 8, 1870 – April 18, 1937) was an Argentine politician who was Vice President of Argentina from September 6, 1930 to October 20, 1930 under José Félix Uriburu, resigning due to an illness.

Political offices
Preceded by Enrique Martínez	Vice-President of Argentina; 1930	Succeeded by Julio Argentino Pascual Roca
