= Ramón José Cárcano =

Argentine lawyer, historian and politician

Ramón Cárcano
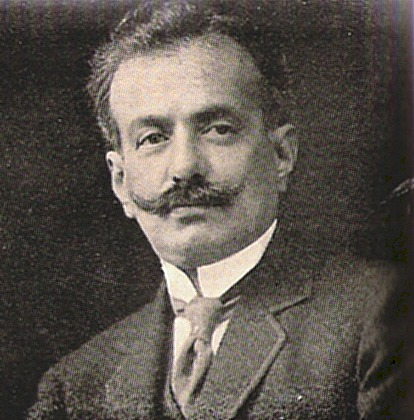

Ambassador to Brazil
- In office 1933–1938

Governor of Córdoba
- In office May 17, 1925 – May 17, 1928
- Preceded by: Julio A. P. Roca
- Succeeded by: Enrique Martínez
- In office May 17, 1913 – May 17, 1916
- Preceded by: Félix Garzón
- Succeeded by: Eufrasio Loza

Personal details
- Born: Ramón José Eleuterio Cárcano César; April 18, 1860 Córdoba, Argentina
- Died: June 2, 1946 (aged 86) Córdoba
- Resting place: La Recoleta Cemetery
- Party: National Autonomist Party
- Spouse: Ana Sáenz de Zumarán
- Education: National University of Córdoba
- Occupation: Cattle rancher
- Profession: Lawyer

Ramón José Eleuterio Cárcano César (April 18, 1860 — June 2, 1946) was an Argentine lawyer, historian and politician who served as Governor of Córdoba from 1913 to 1916, and from 1925 to 1928.

== Life and times ==
José Ramón Carcano was born in Córdoba, Argentina in 1860 to Honoria César and Innocencio Cárcano. His father, who descended from a family of landowners in the Lombardy Region of Italy, emigrated to Argentina for political reasons in 1849. The younger Cárcano attended the Colegio Nacional de Monserrat, and later enrolled at the National University of Córdoba Law School, graduating in 1881. His doctoral thesis, "Of Natural Children, Adultery, Incest and Sacrilege," advocated equality between legitimate and illegitimate children, and sparked public debate, as well as ad hominem attacks by the Bishop of Córdoba.

He began his career in public service in 1880 as private secretary to Governor Miguel Juárez Celman. He taught as Professor of Commercial Law at the University of Córdoba from 1882 to 1884, when he was elected to the Argentine Chamber of Deputies for the province. Governor Olmos appointed Cárcano Minister of Justice, Culture and Education, and Juárez Celman, who was elected President of Argentina in 1886, appointed him Director General of Post and Telegraph Office the following year. Cárcano initiated plans for a new central post office for the rapidly growing city of Buenos Aires, and in 1888, the President signed a congressional bill for its construction. The structure, ultimately completed in 1928, served as the Buenos Aires Central Post Office until 2005.

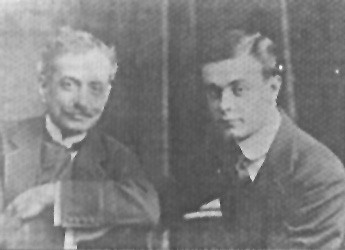
Ramón J. Cárcano (left) and his elder son, Miguel Ángel.

He married Ana Sáenz de Zumarán in 1887, and they had three children. Following Juárez Celman's resignation in 1890, Cárcano toured Europe, returning in 1891 to his estancia on the banks of the Tercero River. There, he introduced Polled Durham cattle, a vaccine against anthrax that had been prepared at the Pasteur Institute in Paris, and an imported steam plough (becoming the first landowner in Argentina to use these innovations). Cárcano wrote numerous historical works during this period, notably El general Quiroga y la expedición al desierto (1882), Perfiles contemporáneos (1885), La universidad de Córdoba (1892), Historia de los medios de comunicación y transporte en la Argentina (1893), Estudios coloniales (1895), and La reforma universitaria (1901), and was inducted into the National Academy of History of Argentina in 1901. Named President of the Agricultural Education Advisory Commission in 1907, he joined the Higher Institute of Agronomy and Veterinary Medicine, becoming the school's first dean upon its 1909 incorporation into the University of Buenos Aires. Among his best-known works outside the subject of history was Evolución histórica del régimen de la tierra pública, a study on eminent domain.

Cárcano was again elected to Congress in 1910. He served as President of the Constitutional Convention of the Province of Córdoba in 1912, and briefly as Federal Receiver of San Juan Province in 1913. He was then elected Governor of Córdoba, and took office on May 17. His administration, which lasted until 1916, promoted agricultural mechanization and improved the provincial road network. He continued to write, publishing among others La misión Mitre en el Brasil (1913), De Caseros al 11 de Septiembre (1919), Del sitio de Buenos Aires al Campo de Cepeda (1921), and Juan Facundo Quiroga, for which he won a National Literary Prize in 1931. Cárcano returned as Dean of the University of Buenos Aires School of Agronomy and Veterinary Medicine from 1921 to 1924, and twice served as President of the National Academy of History.

He was re-elected Governor of Córdoba for a three-year term in 1925, during which tenure the provincial seal of Córdoba (based on a design first used in 1573) was instituted. A conservative politician in the National Autonomist Party tradition that typified most Argentine landowners, Cárcano joined the center-right Concordance alliance as a National Democrat, serving in the Agustín Justo administration as Chairman of the National Council of Education in 1932, and as Ambassador to Brazil between 1933 and 1938. He then retired from public service, and published his memoirs, Mis primeros 80 años (My First 80 Years), in 1943.

Cárcano died in Córdoba in 1946, at age 86.

Political offices
Preceded by Felix Garzón	Governor of Córdoba; 1913–1916	Succeeded by Eufrasio Loza
Preceded by Julio A. Roca, Jr.	Governor of Córdoba; 1925–1928	Succeeded by Enrique Martínez
