= Elpidio González =

Argentine politician (1875–1951)

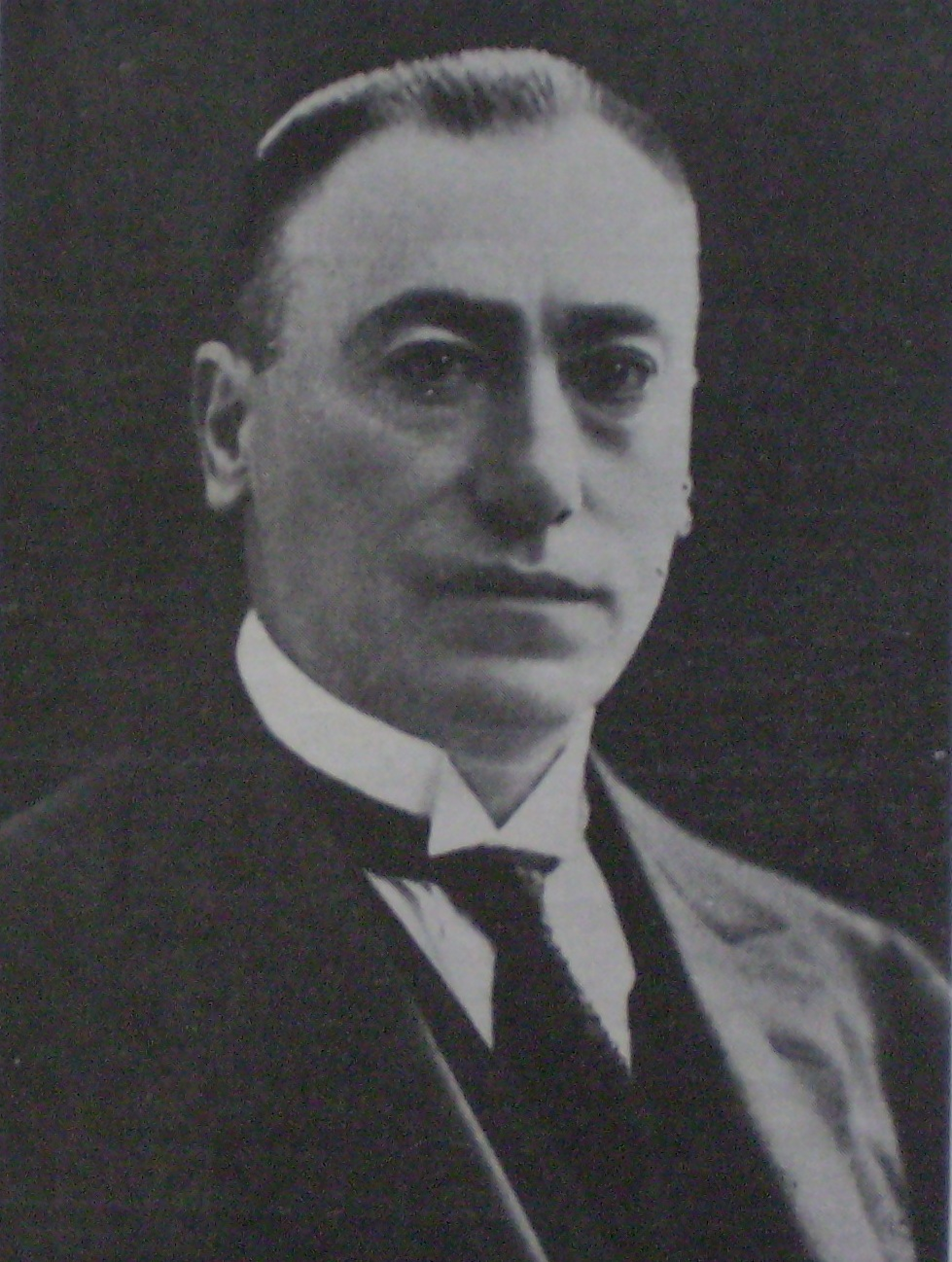

13th Vice President of Argentina
- In office October 12, 1922 – October 11, 1928
- President: Marcelo T. de Alvear
- Preceded by: Pelagio Luna
- Succeeded by: Enrique Martínez

Minister of the Interior
- In office October 12, 1928 – September 6, 1930
- President: Hipólito Yrigoyen
- Preceded by: José P. Tamborini
- Succeeded by: Matías Sánchez Sorondo

Personal details
- Born: August 1, 1875 Rosario, Santa Fe
- Died: October 18, 1951 (aged 76) Buenos Aires,
- Resting place: La Recoleta Cemetery
- Party: Radical Civic Union
- Profession: Politician

Elpidio González (August 1, 1875 – October 18, 1951) was an Argentine politician of the Radical Civic Union. He was Vice President from 1922 to 1928 in the Marcelo T. de Alvear administration.

Elpidio González was born on August 1, 1875, in Rosario, Santa Fe Province, to Domingo and Serafina González. González studied in Rosario for his elementary and secondary education, later, he and his mother moved to Córdoba where he studied law at the National University of Córdoba. González finished his study of law and obtained a Law Degree at the National University of La Plata in 1907.

In the 1910s González enjoyed political success as he was elected as a National Deputy for the city of Buenos Aires in 1912, and later, for the Province of Córdoba in 1916.

When Yrigoyen was elected president (1916-1922) he served as Minister of War between 1916 and 1918 and as Buenos Aires Chief of Police between 1918 and 1921. In 1921 he was elected President of the Radical Civic Union party. In 1922 he was elected vice president on the Marcelo T. de Alvear ticket (1922-1928), after defeating a conservative party alliance called the Concertación Nacional. During his administration he opposed the president on many issues as part of a conflict between Yrigoyen's followers and the Antipersonalist faction of the Radical Union.

In 1928 during Yrigoyen's second administration (1928-1930) he served as Interior Minister until the military coup of September 6, 1930, which led to his incarceration for two years. He refused to receive the pension as vice president of the nation and in his last years, he worked as a seller for Anilinas Colibrí company. He died in absolute poverty.

== Bibliography ==
- Garcia Massa, Oscar (2000). Elpidio González. Historiando. .

Political offices
Preceded by Pelagio Luna	Vice President of Argentina; 1922-1928	Succeeded by Enrique Martínez
