= Enrique Martínez (politician) =

Argentine politician

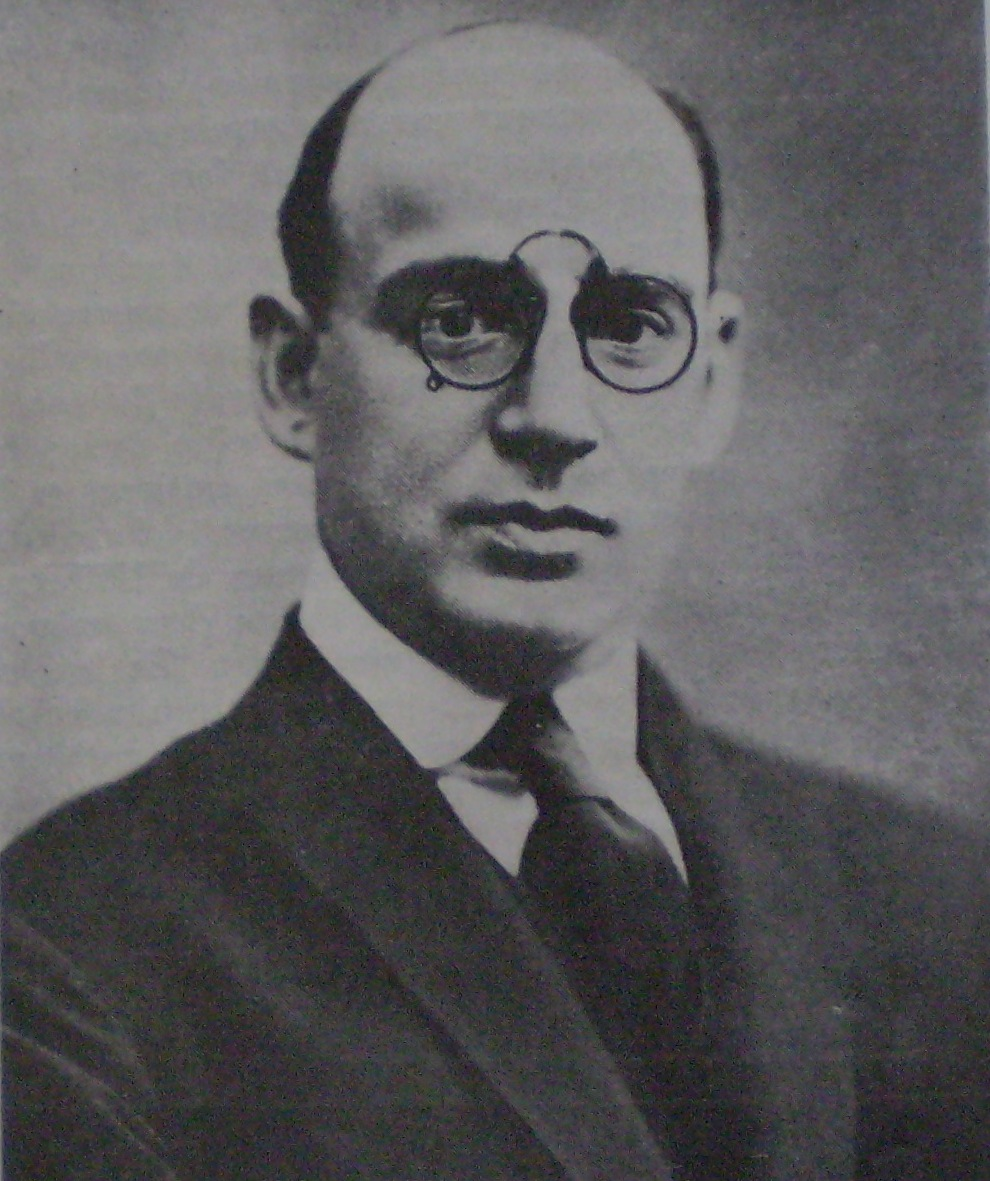

14th Vice President of Argentina
- In office October 12, 1928 – September 6, 1930
- President: Hipólito Yrigoyen
- Preceded by: Elpidio González
- Succeeded by: Enrique Santamarina

Governor of Córdoba
- In office May 17, 1928 – October 10, 1928
- Vice Governor: José Antonio Ceballos
- Preceded by: Ramón J. Cárcano
- Succeeded by: José Antonio Ceballos

Personal details
- Born: July 25, 1887 Córdoba, Argentina
- Died: February 20, 1938 (aged 50) Villa María
- Party: Radical Civic Union
- Profession: Lawyer

Enrique Martínez (July 25, 1887 – February 20, 1938) was an Argentine lawyer and politician, governor of Córdoba Province Argentine Vice President during the second Hipólito Yrigoyen administration.

== Biography ==
Martinez was born in Córdoba, and studied there until 1900, when he started his military service. He later studied law at the National University of Córdoba, receiving a degree in 1911.

Martinez was elected to the Argentine Chamber of Deputies in 1917 to fill the seat vacated by Vice President Elpidio González. He was elected Governor of Córdoba in December 1927, with José Antonio Ceballos as Vice-Governor, and took office on May 17, 1928. The death, on July 22, of Vice President-elect Francisco Beiró, prompted President-elect Hipólito Yrigoyen to ask Martínez to take the late Francisco Beiró's place, and on October 12, 1928, he was inaugurated Vice President of Argentina.

Following a series of incidents organized against the populist Yrigoyen, on September 5, 1930, the President took a leave of health, and Martínez assumed the presidency on an acting basis. A coup d'état overthrew the Yrigoyen administration the following day, however, and both he and Martínez was jailed for two years.

Martínez moved to Buenos Aires in 1934, and retired from public life. While riding horseback in Villa María, Córdoba, in 1938, he suffered an accident, and died at age 51.

Political offices
Preceded by Elpidio González	Vice President of Argentina; 1928–1930	Succeeded by Enrique Santamarina
Preceded by Ramón J. Cárcano	Governor of Córdoba; 1928–1928	Succeeded by José Antonio Ceballos
