= List of Argentine senators, 2025–2027 =

This is list of members of the Argentine Senate from 10 December 2023 to 9 December 2025.

== Composition ==
Inter-bloc	Bloc	President
Popular (25) (President: José Mayans)	Justicialist (21)	José Mayans
Popular (25) (President: José Mayans)	Federal Social Justice (2)	Fernando Aldo Salino
Popular (25) (President: José Mayans)	Civic Front for Santiago (2)	Gerardo Zamora
La Libertad Avanza (21)		Patricia Bullrich
Radical Civic Union (10)		Eduardo Vischi
Country Momentum (7) (President: Carlos Mauricio Espínola)	PRO Front (3)	Martín Goerling Lara
Country Momentum (7) (President: Carlos Mauricio Espínola)	United Provinces (2)	Carlos Mauricio Espínola
Country Momentum (7) (President: Carlos Mauricio Espínola)	Arise Chubut (1)	Edith Terenzi
Country Momentum (7) (President: Carlos Mauricio Espínola)	Independence (1)	Beatriz Ávila
Federal Conviction (3)		Carolina Moisés
Front for the Renewal of Concord (2)		Carlos Omar Arce
For Santa Cruz (2)		José María Carambia
Salteños First (1)		Flavia Royón
La Neuquinidad (1)		Julieta Corroza
Source: senado.gob.ar (last update: 24 February 2026)

== Senate leadership ==
Title	Officeholder	Caucus	Province
President of the Senate (Note: Ex officio as Vice President of Argentina.)	Victoria Villarruel	La Libertad Avanza	City of Buenos Aires
Provisional President	Bartolomé Abdala	La Libertad Avanza	San Luis
Vice President	Carolina Moisés	Federal Conviction	Jujuy
First Vice President	Carolina Losada	Radical Civic Union	Santa Fe
Second Vice President	Alejandra Vigo	United Provinces	Córdoba

== Election cycles ==
Election	Term	
Election	Start	End
2021	10 December 2021	9 December 2027
2023	10 December 2023	9 December 2029
2025	10 December 2025	9 December 2031

== List of senators ==
Province	Senator	Party	Term	
Province	Senator	Party	From	To
Buenos Aires Province	Maximiliano Abad	Radical Civic Union	2023	2029
Buenos Aires Province	Eduardo "Wado" de Pedro	Justicialist	2023	2029
Buenos Aires Province	Juliana Di Tullio	Justicialist	2023	2029
City of Buenos Aires	Patricia Bullrich	La Libertad Avanza	2025	2031
City of Buenos Aires	Agustín Monteverde	La Libertad Avanza	2025	2031
City of Buenos Aires	Mariano Recalde	Justicialist	2025	2031
Catamarca	Lucía Corpacci	Justicialist	2021	2027
Catamarca	Flavio Fama	Radical Civic Union	2021	2027
Catamarca	Guillermo Andrada	Federal Conviction	2021	2027
Chaco	Juan Cruz Godoy	La Libertad Avanza	2025	2031
Chaco	Silvana Schneider	Radical Civic Union	2025	2031
Chaco	Jorge Capitanich	Justicialist	2025	2031
Chubut	Andrea Marcela Cristina	PRO Front	2023 (Note: Since 7 December 2023. Replaced Ignacio Torres.)	2027
Chubut	Carlos Linares	Justicialist	2021	2027
Chubut	Edith Terenzi	Arise Chubut	2021	2027
Córdoba	Carmen Álvarez Rivero	La Libertad Avanza	2021	2027
Córdoba	Luis Juez	La Libertad Avanza	2021	2027
Córdoba	Alejandra Vigo	United Provinces	2021	2027
Corrientes	Carlos Mauricio Espínola	United Provinces	2021	2027
Corrientes	Mercedes Valenzuela	Radical Civic Union	2021	2027
Corrientes	Eduardo Vischi	Radical Civic Union	2021	2027
Entre Ríos	Joaquín Alberto Benegas Lynch	La Libertad Avanza	2025	2031
Entre Ríos	Romina María Almeida	La Libertad Avanza	2025	2031
Entre Ríos	Adán Bahl	Justicialist	2025	2031
Formosa	María Teresa Margarita González	Justicialist	2023	2029
Formosa	José Miguel Ángel Mayans	Justicialist	2023	2029
Formosa	Francisco Paoltroni	La Libertad Avanza	2023	2029
Jujuy	Ezequiel Atauche	La Libertad Avanza	2023	2029
Jujuy	Vilma Facunda Bedia	La Libertad Avanza	2023	2029
Jujuy	María Carolina Moisés	Federal Conviction	2023	2029
La Pampa	Daniel Pablo Bensusán	Justicialist	2021	2027
La Pampa	Daniel Kroneberger	Radical Civic Union	2021	2027
La Pampa	María Victoria Huala	PRO Front	2021	2027
La Rioja	María Florencia López	Justicialist	2023	2029
La Rioja	Claudia Cecilia López	La Libertad Avanza	2023 (Note: Since 29 September 2026. Replaced Juan Carlos Pagotto after his death in office in 29 September 2026.)	2029
La Rioja	Jesús Fernando Rejal	Federal Social Justice	2023	2029
Mendoza	Anabel Fernández Sagasti	Justicialist	2021	2027
Mendoza	Mariana Juri	Radical Civic Union	2021	2027
Mendoza	Rodolfo Alejandro Suárez	Radical Civic Union	2023 (Note: Since 7 December 2023.)	2027
Misiones	Carlos Omar Arce	Front for the Renewal of Social Concord	2023	2029
Misiones	Enrique Martín Goerling Lara	PRO Front	2023	2029
Misiones	Sonia Elizabeth Rojas Decut	Front for the Renewal of Social Concord	2023	2029
Neuquén	Nadia Márquez	La Libertad Avanza	2025	2031
Neuquén	Mario Pablo Cervi	La Libertad Avanza	2025	2031
Neuquén	Julieta Corroza	La Neuquinidad	2025	2031
Río Negro	Martín Soria	Justicialist	2025	2031
Río Negro	Ana Inés Marks	Justicialist	2025	2031
Río Negro	Enzo Fullone	La Libertad Avanza	2025 (Note: Since 26 December 2025. Took office after the Senate declined to seat Lorena Villaverde.)	2031
Salta	María Emilia Orozco	La Libertad Avanza	2025	2031
Salta	Gonzalo Guzmán Coraita	La Libertad Avanza	2025	2031
Salta	Flavia Royón	Salteños First	2025	2031
San Juan	María Celeste Giménez Navarro	Justicialist	2023	2029
San Juan	Bruno Olivera Lucero	La Libertad Avanza	2023	2029
San Juan	Sergio Uñac	Justicialist	2023	2029
San Luis	Bartolomé Abdala	La Libertad Avanza	2023	2029
San Luis	Ivanna Marcela Arrascaeta	La Libertad Avanza	2023	2029
San Luis	Fernando Aldo Salino	Federal Social Justice	2023	2029
Santa Cruz	José María Carambia	For Santa Cruz	2023	2029
Santa Cruz	Natalia Elena Gadano	For Santa Cruz	2023	2029
Santa Cruz	Alicia Kirchner	Justicialist	2023	2029
Santa Fe	Marcelo Lewandowski	Justicialist	2021	2027
Santa Fe	Carolina Losada	Radical Civic Union	2021	2027
Santa Fe	Eduardo Galaretto	Radical Civic Union	2023 (Note: Since 7 December 2023. Replaced Dionisio Scarpin.)	2027
Santiago del Estero	Gerardo Zamora	Civic Front for Santiago	2025	2031
Santiago del Estero	Elia Esther del Carmen Moreno	Civic Front for Santiago	2025	2031
Santiago del Estero	José Emilio Neder	Justicialist	2025	2031
Tierra del Fuego	Agustín Pedro Coto	La Libertad Avanza	2025	2031
Tierra del Fuego	María Belén Monte de Oca	La Libertad Avanza	2025	2031
Tierra del Fuego	Cándida Cristina López	Justicialist	2025	2031
Tucumán	Beatriz Luisa Ávila	Independence	2021	2027
Tucumán	Juan Manzur	Justicialist	2023 (Note: Since 7 December 2023.)	2027
Tucumán	Sandra Mariela Mendoza	Federal Conviction	2021	2027
