= List of Argentine senators, 2023–2025 =

This is list of members of the Argentine Senate from 10 December 2023 to 9 December 2025.

== Composition ==
Inter-bloc	Bloc	President
Union for the Homeland (34)	National People's Front (15)	José Mayans
Union for the Homeland (34)	Citizen Unity (15)	Juliana Di Tullio
Union for the Homeland (34)	Federal Conviction (4)	Fernando Aldo Salino
Radical Civic Union (13)		Eduardo Vischi
PRO Front (7)		Alfredo Luis De Angeli
La Libertad Avanza (6)		Ezequiel Atauche
We Do Federal Coalition (3)	Federal Unity (2)	Carlos Espínola
We Do Federal Coalition (3)	Federal Change (1)	Juan Carlos Romero
Federal Innovation (3)	Front for the Renewal of Concord (2)	Carlos Omar Arce
Federal Innovation (3)	Together We Are Río Negro (1)	Mónica Esther Silva
For Santa Cruz (2)		José María Carambia
For Social Justice (1)		Beatriz Ávila
Freedom, Work and Progress (1)		Francisco Paoltroni (Note: Paoltroni originally belonged to La Libertad Avanza bloc, until his expulsion on February 28, 2024.)
Wake up Chubut (1)		Edith Terenzi
Neuquén Movement (1)		Carmen Lucila Crexell
Source: senado.gob.ar (last update: 4 April 2025)

== Senate leadership ==
Title	Officeholder	Caucus	Province
President of the Senate (Note: Ex officio as Vice President of Argentina.)	Victoria Villarruel	La Libertad Avanza	City of Buenos Aires
Provisional President	Bartolomé Abdala	La Libertad Avanza	San Luis
Vice President	Vacant	Union for the Homeland	—N/a
First Vice President	Carolina Losada	Radical Civic Union	Santa Fe
Second Vice President	Alejandra Vigo	Federal Unity	Córdoba

== Election cycles ==
Election	Term	
Election	Start	End
2019	10 December 2019	9 December 2025
2021	10 December 2021	9 December 2027
2023	10 December 2023	9 December 2029

== List of senators ==
Province	Photo	Senator	Party	Term	
Province	Photo	Senator	Party	From	To
Buenos Aires		Maximiliano Abad	Radical Civic Union	2023	2029
Buenos Aires		Eduardo Enrique "Wado" de Pedro	Citizen Unity	2023	2029
Buenos Aires		Juliana Di Tullio	Citizen Unity	2023	2029
Buenos Aires City		Martín Lousteau	Radical Civic Union	2019	2025
Buenos Aires City		Mariano Recalde	National People's Front	2019	2025
Buenos Aires City		Guadalupe Tagliaferri	PRO Front	2019	2025
Catamarca		Guillermo Eduardo Andrada	Federal Conviction	2021	2027
Catamarca		Lucía Benigna Corpacci	National People's Front	2021	2027
Catamarca		Flavio Sergio Fama	Radical Civic Union	2021	2027
Chaco		María Inés Pilatti Vergara	National People's Front	2019	2025
Chaco		Antonio José Rodas	National People's Front	2019	2025
Chaco		Víctor Zimmermann	Radical Civic Union	2019	2025
Chubut		Andrea Marcela Cristina	PRO Front	2023 (Note: Since 7 December 2023. Replaced Ignacio Torres.)	2027
Chubut		Carlos Alberto Linares	Citizen Unity	2021	2027
Chubut		Edith Elizabeth Terenzi	Wake up Chubut	2021	2027
Córdoba		Carmen Álvarez Rivero	PRO Front	2021	2027
Córdoba		Luis Alfredo Juez	PRO Front	2021	2027
Córdoba		Alejandra María Vigo	Federal Unity	2021	2027
Corrientes		Carlos Mauricio Espínola	Federal Unity	2021	2027
Corrientes		Mercedes Gabriela Valenzuela	Radical Civic Union	2021	2027
Corrientes		Eduardo Alejandro Vischi	Radical Civic Union	2021	2027
Entre Ríos		Stefania Cora	Citizen Unity	2025 (Note: Since 20 February 2025. Replaced Edgardo Kueider.)	2025
Entre Ríos		Alfredo Luis de Angeli	PRO Front	2019	2025
Entre Ríos		Stella Maris Elisa Olalla de Moreira	Radical Civic Union	2019	2025
Formosa		María Teresa Margarita González	National People's Front	2023	2029
Formosa		José Miguel Ángel Mayans	National People's Front	2023	2029
Formosa		Francisco Manuel Paoltroni	Freedom, Work and Progress	2023	2029
Jujuy		Ezequiel Atauche	La Libertad Avanza	2023	2029
Jujuy		Vilma Facunda Bedia	La Libertad Avanza	2023	2029
Jujuy		María Carolina Moisés	Federal Conviction	2023	2029
La Pampa		Daniel Pablo Bensusán	National People's Front	2021	2027
La Pampa		María Victoria Huala	PRO Front	2021	2027
La Pampa		Daniel Ricardo Kroneberger	Radical Civic Union	2021	2027
La Rioja		María Florencia López	National People's Front	2023	2029
La Rioja		Juan Carlos Pagotto	La Libertad Avanza	2023	2029
La Rioja		Jesús Fernando Rejal	Federal Conviction	2023	2029
Mendoza		Anabel Fernández Sagasti	Citizen Unity	2021	2027
Mendoza		Mariana Juri	Radical Civic Union	2021	2027
Mendoza		Rodolfo Alejandro Suárez	Radical Civic Union	2023 (Note: Since 7 December 2023. Replaced Alfredo Cornejo.)	2027
Misiones		Carlos Omar Arce	Front for the Renewal of Concord	2023	2029
Misiones		Enrique Martín Goerling Lara	PRO Front	2023	2029
Misiones		Sonia Elizabeth Rojas Decut	Front for the Renewal of Concord	2023	2029
Neuquén		Carmen Lucila Crexell	Neuquén Movement	2019	2025
Neuquén		Oscar Isidro Parrilli	Citizen Unity	2019	2025
Neuquén		Silvia Estela Sapag	Citizen Unity	2019	2025
Río Negro		Claudio Martín Doñate	Citizen Unity	2019	2025
Río Negro		Silvina Marcela García Larraburu	Citizen Unity	2019	2025
Río Negro		Mónica Esther Silva	Together We Are Río Negro	2023 (Note: Since 7 December 2023. Replaced Alberto Weretilneck.)	2025
Salta		Nora del Valle Giménez	Citizen Unity	2019	2025
Salta		Sergio Napoleón Leavy	Citizen Unity	2019	2025
Salta		Juan Carlos Romero	Federal Change	2019	2025
San Juan		María Celeste Giménez Navarro	Citizen Unity	2023	2029
San Juan		Bruno Antonio Olivera Lucero	La Libertad Avanza	2023	2029
San Juan		Sergio Mauricio Uñac	National People's Front	2023	2029
San Luis		Bartolomé Esteban Abdala	La Libertad Avanza	2023	2029
San Luis		Ivanna Marcela Arrascaeta	La Libertad Avanza	2023	2029
San Luis		Fernando Aldo Salino	Federal Conviction	2023	2029
Santa Cruz		José María Carambia	For Santa Cruz	2023	2029
Santa Cruz		Natalia Elena Gadano	For Santa Cruz	2023	2029
Santa Cruz		Alicia Margarita Antonia Kirchner	Citizen Unity	2023	2029
Santa Fe		Marcelo Néstor Lewandowski	National People's Front	2021	2027
Santa Fe		Carolina Losada	Radical Civic Union	2021	2027
Santa Fe		Eduardo Horacio Galaretto	Radical Civic Union	2023 (Note: Since 7 December 2023. Replaced Dionisio Scarpín.)	2027
Santiago del Estero		Claudia Alejandra Ledesma Abdala	National People's Front	2019	2025
Santiago del Estero		Gerardo Antenor Montenegro	National People's Front	2019	2025
Santiago del Estero		José Emilio Neder	National People's Front	2019	2025
Tierra del Fuego		Pablo Daniel Blanco	Radical Civic Union	2019	2025
Tierra del Fuego		María Eugenia Duré	Citizen Unity	2019	2025
Tierra del Fuego		Cándida Cristina López	Citizen Unity	2023 (Note: Since 7 December 2023. Replaced Matías David Rodríguez.)	2025
Tucumán		Beatriz Luisa Ávila	For Social Justice	2021	2027
Tucumán		Juan Luis Manzur	National People's Front	2023 (Note: Since 7 December 2023. Replaced Pablo Yedlin.)	2027
Tucumán		Sandra Mariela Mendoza	National People's Front	2021	2027
