= List of Argentine senators, 2021–2023 =

This is a list of members of the Argentine Senate from 10 December 2021 to 9 December 2023.

== Composition ==
Inter-bloc	Bloc	President
Frente de Todos / Unión por la Patria (31)		José Mayans
Juntos por el Cambio (33) (President: Alfredo Cornejo)	Radical Civic Union (18)	Luis Petcoff Naidenoff
Juntos por el Cambio (33) (President: Alfredo Cornejo)	PRO Front (9)	Humberto Schiavoni
Juntos por el Cambio (33) (President: Alfredo Cornejo)	Federal Change (4)	Ignacio Torres
Juntos por el Cambio (33) (President: Alfredo Cornejo)	Party for Social Justice (1)	Beatriz Ávila
Juntos por el Cambio (33) (President: Alfredo Cornejo)	Production and Labour (1)	Roberto Basualdo
Federal Unity (5)		Alejandra Vigo
Front for the Renewal of Concord (1)		Magdalena Solari
We Have a Future Argentina (1)		María Clara Vega
Together We Are Río Negro (1)		Alberto Weretilneck
Source: senado.gob.ar (last update: 20 November 2023)

== Senate leadership ==
Title	Officeholder	Caucus	Province
President of the Senate (Note: Ex officio as Vice President of Argentina.)	Cristina Fernández de Kirchner	Frente de Todos, then Unión por la Patria	Buenos Aires Province
Provisional President	Claudia Ledesma Abdala	Frente de Todos, then Unión por la Patria	Santiago del Estero
Vice President	Carolina Losada	Juntos por el Cambio	Santa Fe
First Vice President	Maurice Closs	Frente de Todos, then Unión por la Patria	Misiones
Second Vice President	Guadalupe Tagliaferri	Juntos por el Cambio	Buenos Aires

== Election cycles ==
Election	Term	
Election	Start	End
2017	10 December 2017	9 December 2023
2019	10 December 2019	9 December 2025
2021	10 December 2021	9 December 2027

== List of senators ==
Province	Photo	Senator	Party	Term	
Province	Photo	Senator	Party	From	To
Buenos Aires		José María Torello	PRO Front	2021 (Note: Yet to take office. Replacing Esteban Bullrich.)	2023
Buenos Aires		Gladys González	PRO Front	2017	2023
Buenos Aires		Juliana Di Tullio	Frente de Todos, then Unión por la Patria	2021 (Note: Since 19 August 2021. Replaced Jorge Taiana.)	2023
Buenos Aires City		Martín Lousteau	Radical Civic Union	2019	2025
Buenos Aires City		Mariano Recalde	Frente de Todos, then Unión por la Patria	2019	2025
Buenos Aires City		Guadalupe Tagliaferri	PRO Front	2019	2025
Catamarca		Guillermo Eduardo Andrada	Frente de Todos, then Unión por la Patria	2021	2027
Catamarca		Lucía Benigna Corpacci	Frente de Todos, then Unión por la Patria	2021	2027
Catamarca		Flavio Sergio Fama	Radical Civic Union	2021	2027
Chaco		María Inés Pilatti Vergara	Frente de Todos, then Unión por la Patria	2019	2025
Chaco		Antonio José Rodas	Frente de Todos, then Unión por la Patria	2019	2025
Chaco		Víctor Zimmermann	Radical Civic Union	2019	2025
Chubut		Carlos Alberto Linares	Frente de Todos, then Unión por la Patria	2021	2027
Chubut		Edith Elizabeth Terenzi	Chubut Integration and Development	2021	2027
Chubut		Ignacio Agustín Torres	Chubut Integration and Development	2021	2027
Córdoba		Carmen Álvarez Rivero	PRO Front	2021	2027
Córdoba		Luis Alfredo Juez	PRO Front	2021	2027
Córdoba		Alejandra María Vigo	Federal Unity	2021	2027
Corrientes		Carlos Mauricio Espínola	Federal Unity	2021	2027
Corrientes		Mercedes Gabriela Valenzuela	Radical Civic Union	2021	2027
Corrientes		Eduardo Alejandro Vischi	Radical Civic Union	2021	2027
Entre Ríos		Alfredo Luis de Angeli	PRO Front	2019	2025
Entre Ríos		Edgardo Darío Kueider	Federal Unity	2019	2025
Entre Ríos		Stella Maris Olalla	Radical Civic Union	2019	2025
Formosa		María Teresa Margarita González	Frente de Todos, then Unión por la Patria	2017	2023
Formosa		José Miguel Ángel Mayans	Frente de Todos, then Unión por la Patria	2017	2023
Formosa		Luis Carlos Petcoff Naidenoff	Radical Civic Union	2017	2023
Jujuy		Mario Raymundo Fiad	Radical Civic Union	2017	2023
Jujuy		Silvia del Rosario Giacoppo	Radical Civic Union	2017	2023
Jujuy		Guillermo Eugenio Mario Snopek	Federal Unity	2017	2023
La Pampa		Daniel Pablo Bensusán	Frente de Todos, then Unión por la Patria	2021	2027
La Pampa		María Victoria Huala	PRO Front	2021	2027
La Pampa		Daniel Ricardo Kroneberger	Radical Civic Union	2021	2027
La Rioja		Ricardo Antonio Guerra	Frente de Todos, then Unión por la Patria	2021 (Note: Since 24 February 2021. Replaced Carlos Menem.)	2023
La Rioja		Julio César Martínez	Radical Civic Union	2017	2023
La Rioja		María Clara Vega	We Have a Future Argentina	2019 (Note: Since 20 December 2019. Replaced Inés Brizuela y Doria.)	2023
Mendoza		Alfredo Víctor Cornejo	Radical Civic Union	2021	2027
Mendoza		Anabel Fernández Sagasti	Frente de Todos, then Unión por la Patria	2021	2027
Mendoza		Mariana Juri	Radical Civic Union	2021	2027
Misiones		Maurice Fabián Closs	Frente de Todos, then Unión por la Patria	2017	2023
Misiones		Humberto Luis Arturo Schiavoni	PRO Front	2017	2023
Misiones		Magdalena Solari Quintana	Front for the Renewal of Concord	2017	2023
Neuquén		Carmen Lucila Crexell	Neuquén Movement	2019	2025
Neuquén		Oscar Isidro Parrilli	Frente de Todos, then Unión por la Patria	2019	2025
Neuquén		Silvia Estela Sapag	Frente de Todos, then Unión por la Patria	2019	2025
Río Negro		Claudio Martín Doñate	Frente de Todos, then Unión por la Patria	2019	2025
Río Negro		Silvina Marcela García Larraburu	Frente de Todos, then Unión por la Patria	2019	2025
Río Negro		Alberto Edgardo Weretilneck	Together We Are Río Negro	2019	2025
Salta		Nora del Valle Giménez	Frente de Todos, then Unión por la Patria	2019	2025
Salta		Sergio Napoleón Leavy	Frente de Todos, then Unión por la Patria	2019	2025
Salta		Juan Carlos Romero	October 8th Justicialist	2019	2025
San Juan		Roberto Gustavo Basualdo	Production and Labour	2017	2023
San Juan		Cristina del Carmen López Valverde	Frente de Todos, then Unión por la Patria	2017	2023
San Juan		José Rubén Uñac	Frente de Todos, then Unión por la Patria	2017	2023
San Luis		María Eugenia Catalfamo	Federal Unity	2017	2023
San Luis		Gabriela González Riollo	PRO Front	2021 (Note: Since 10 December 2021. Replaced Claudio Poggi.)	2023
San Luis		Adolfo Rodríguez Saá	Frente de Todos, then Unión por la Patria	2017	2023
Santa Cruz		Eduardo Raúl Costa	Radical Civic Union	2017	2023
Santa Cruz		Ana María Ianni	Frente de Todos, then Unión por la Patria	2017	2023
Santa Cruz		María Belén Tapia	Radical Civic Union	2017	2023
Santa Fe		Marcelo Néstor Lewandowski	Frente de Todos, then Unión por la Patria	2021	2027
Santa Fe		Carolina Losada	Radical Civic Union	2021	2027
Santa Fe		Dionisio Fernando Scarpin	Radical Civic Union	2021	2027
Santiago del Estero		Claudia Alejandra Ledesma Abdala	Frente de Todos, then Unión por la Patria	2019	2025
Santiago del Estero		Gerardo Antenor Montenegro	Frente de Todos, then Unión por la Patria	2019	2025
Santiago del Estero		José Emilio Neder	Frente de Todos, then Unión por la Patria	2019	2025
Tierra del Fuego		Pablo Daniel Blanco	Radical Civic Union	2019	2025
Tierra del Fuego		María Eugenia Duré	Frente de Todos, then Unión por la Patria	2019	2025
Tierra del Fuego		Matías David Rodríguez	Frente de Todos, then Unión por la Patria	2019	2025
Tucumán		Beatriz Luisa Ávila	Party for Social Justice	2021	2027
Tucumán		Sandra Mariela Mendoza	Frente de Todos, then Unión por la Patria	2021	2027
Tucumán		Pablo Raúl Yedlin	Frente de Todos, then Unión por la Patria	2021	2027
