= Vilma Bedia =

Argentine politician

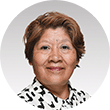

National Senator
- Incumbent
- Assumed office 10 December 2023
- Constituency: Jujuy

Personal details
- Born: 27 November 1961 (age 64) San Salvador de Jujuy, Argentina
- Party: La Libertad Avanza (since 2025); Federal Renewal Party (until 2025)

Vilma Facunda Bedia (born 27 November 1961) is an Argentine teacher, anti-abortion activist, evangelical pastor, and politician. She has served as a national senator for Jujuy Province since 2023.

Bedia was elected to the Senate as a member of La Libertad Avanza in the 2023 legislative elections. The party's list received 38.04% of the vote in Jujuy, and she took office alongside Ezequiel Atauche.

== Early life ==
Bedia was born on 27 November 1961 in San Salvador de Jujuy. She obtained a teaching degree in fine arts from Instituto R. S. Ortiz in San Salvador de Jujuy in 1985. In 2008, she completed a postgraduate university qualification in education at the National University of Tucumán.

She also attended conferences and training programmes related to education, institutional management, and social development. These included the Congreso Profesional del presente para construir el futuro de un gran país and the Congreso los desafíos de la educación en la sociedad del conocimiento, both held in San Luis Province in 2011.

== Career and activism ==
Bedia completed courses and workshops on educational tutoring, the role of school supervisors, school violence, and quality of life. In 2008, she undertook further training in culture and professional competence at the National University of Jujuy, with a historical and anthropological focus. She also attended seminars on administrative communication in public administration. Bedia taught at secondary schools for more than two decades. She later held administrative positions within the education system, serving as an assistant secretary at several institutions.

From 2017 to 2023, she served as assistant secretary of Bachillerato No. 13 in Susques.

Bedia coordinated the educational project Susques Verde, which involved secondary-school students in environmental activities. She has also participated in community work with Indigenous communities.

She is a member of a Pentecostal evangelical church and has worked as a pastor and missionary with the Fundación Misionera del Amor Coreano.

== Political career ==
Bedia was elected to the Senate as a member of La Libertad Avanza in the 2023 legislative elections. The party's list received 38.04% of the vote in Jujuy, and she took office alongside Ezequiel Atauche.

== Electoral history ==
Electoral history of Vilma Bedia
Election	Office	List	#	District	Votes			Result	Ref.
Election	Office	List	#	District	Total	%	P.	Result	Ref.
2025	National Senator	Federal Renewal Party	2	Jujuy Province	153,333	37.93%	1st (Note: Presented on an electoral list. The data shown represents the share of the vote the entire party/alliance received in that constituency.)	Elected	
