= Juan Carlos Pagotto =

Argentine lawyer and politician (1952–2026)

- Pagotto in 2024

Senator of the Argentine Nation for La Rioja
- In office 10 December 2023 – 29 September 2026
- President: Javier Milei
- Succeeded by: Claudia Cecilia López

Deputy from the Province of La Rioja for Chilecito Department
- In office 10 December 1993 – 10 December 1997
- President: Carlos Menem

Personal details
- Born: 8 July 1952 Mendoza, Argentina
- Died: 29 September 2026 (aged 74) La Rioja, Argentina
- Party: La Libertad Avanza (from 2024)
- Relations: Mario Emilio Pagotto (brother); Roberto Pagotto (brother); Emilio Pagotto (nephew); Alfredo Chade (cousin)
- Children: Juan María Pagotto
- Education: National University of Córdoba

Juan Carlos Pagotto (8 July 1952 – 29 September 2026) was an Argentine lawyer and politician. He was Senator of the Argentine Nation for La Rioja from 2023 for the La Libertad Avanza bloc and chairman of the Senate Commission of Justice and Penal Affairs, as well as of the Standing Bicameral Commission of National Congress Legislative Procedure.

== Life and career ==
=== Background and education ===
Pagotto graduated from the National University of Córdoba with the titles procedural representative (procurador) and lawyer (abogado) sometime in the years 1970–1974.

His brothers were Roberto Pagotto and Mario Emilio Pagotto, former judge of the La Rioja Electoral Tribunal, and former judge of the Superior Tribunal of Justice of La Rioja, which in 2023 was involved in the project of Federal Intervention into the Judicial Power of La Rioja 2539/11, in which the then Radical Civic Union (UCR) bloc was seeking its removal; even as Mario Emilio Pagotto was also undergoing an impeachment process. His nephew Emilio Pagotto, Mario Emilio Pagotto's son, is a lawyer known for defending alleged abusers in cases of father-daughter incest, such as the high-profile case known as "Arcoíris" ("Rainbow"). His cousin, the functionary Alfredo Chade, has since 2019 been under investigation in a protracted case involving child sexual abuse, following the discovery of nearly a thousand files containing child sexual exploitation material.

=== Professional career ===
Pagotto practised as a lawyer in Chilecito from 1974 to 1998, and then in La Rioja.

In the course of Pagotto's activities as a lawyer, he participated in many important cases in the Province of La Rioja, foremost among which were the "Estrella" case, in which he made up part of the defence of the former commissioner Domingo Vera, who was sentenced to life imprisonment for murdering the priests Carlos de Dios Murias and Rogelio Gabriel Longueville and the great "Menéndez" case, in which he served as defence counsel for the former federal judge of La Rioja, Roberto Catalán, and for Roberto Ganemen in Trials for Crimes Against Humanity in Argentina. Likewise, in 2021, Pagotto headed the defence for the convict Patricio Pioli, in a high-profile case in which for the first time in Argentina a man was sent to prison for distributing intimate material without consent.

=== Political career ===
Between 1993 and 1997, Pagotto was Provincial Deputy for the Department of Chilecito, representing Peronism. In 2023 he would again occupy a government office, this time as Senator of the Argentine Nation for the Province of La Rioja on the La Libertad Avanza list.

On 22 February 2024, Pagotto was elected Chairman of the Standing Bicameral Commission of National Congress Legislative Procedure, which was charged mainly with analysing the validity of the DNUs issued by the executive power. Pagotto's name was put forth by Senator Juan Carlos Romero and through votes from La Libertad Avanza and PRO legislators. Human rights groups came out against his candidacy, however, over Pagotto's history of defending members of the military who were sentenced for crimes against humanity.

=== Death ===
Pagotto died from a heart attack in La Rioja, on 29 September 2026, at the age of 74.

== Controversies ==
=== About gender-based violence ===
On 6 May 2021, at the seventh hearing in the "Pioli Patricio Amalio" case, challenges were raised against things that Pagotto said in his summation referring to gender-based violence as "a business comparable to that of human rights".

"…for those of us who love criminal law, it is infuriating; we are seeing that gender-based violence has turned into a business — much like human rights — without placing blame on the victim, or the alleged victim…"

— Stenographic transcript, 06-05-2021

=== About the Holocaust and Argentina's last military dictatorship ===
On 23 December 2012, Pagotto was the subject of criticism of his closing arguments in the case of crimes against humanity against the former vice-commodore Luis Fernando Estrella, in which he set the theory of the two demons in contrast with The Holocaust and the Great Purge.

"It is true, gentlemen of the Tribunal, that a brutal civil-military coup took place here, and it is true that the people here were victims of both sides. To claim that the "theory of the two demons" does not exist is just as simplistic as saying, "I was good because I attacked in the name of the people." This brings to mind clear historical examples: Hitler was vilified because he killed in the name of race – killing five or twenty million people – whereas Stalin and his purges claimed fifty million lives, yet he killed in the name of the people. It seems that the rationale behind committing a crime is what is being treated as a justification for it."

— End of the Closing Argument in the "Estrella" case – Oral Tribunal of La Rioja November 2012

=== About his office staff ===
On 20 March 2024, Pagotto's appointment of his son, Juan María Pagotto, as a member of his office staff, with the highest salary allowed on the Congressional pay scale, was challenged. His son was denounced for several death threats that he made to leaders of the then current opposition. The threats, which were aimed at Peronist leaders, ranged from "impale Alberto Fernández in the Casa Rosada" and "hang Leandro Santoro on the Obelisk", to mentions of the desaparecidos during the country's last military dictatorship who, according to Juan Pagotto, "were neither innocent nor sufficient in number."

=== About trafficking minors ===
In July 2024, while the Senate was debating the amendment to Article 139 bis of the Penal Code which deals with the kidnapping and/or trafficking of minors (O.D. Nº 39/24) Pagotto became embroiled in a controversy over his attempt to modify the Senate report. The original bill, introduced by Senator Carolina Losada, proposed that those found guilty of handing over minors be penalized with up to 15 years in prison. Nevertheless, Pagotto, in his role as Reporting Member of the Commission of Justice and Penal Issues before the upper chamber, introduced an amendment that would exempt from this penalty those families who handed over their children in situations of vulnerability:

"A prison sentence of 4 to 10 years shall be imposed upon anybody who receives or hands over a minor in exchange for payment, promise of remuneration or whatever other kind of consideration, if no other crime with a more severe penalty results (...) A parent who hands over their child is exempt from this penalty if a state of necessity exists."

The Senator's intervention, which he justified by arguing that "there are whole families who have eight, nine children, who at some time have given a child and if we sanction it we leave all the rest of the family without protection", was rejected by other legislators. Juliana Di Tullio, an opposition Senator, interrupted Pagotto's speech, pointing out that he was reading a proposal that did not match the report approved by the Commission.

"You are not reading the report, are you, Senator Pagotto? (...) You are not reading the report, you are reading a proposal that you brought forth and you are on our benches but it is not the report."

— Juliana Di Tullio, 5 July 2024

Organizations such as Militamos Adopción ("We Advocate for Adoption") also criticized Pagotto's attempt to modify the bill, arguing in a communiqué on the social media site X that "the obligation of the chairman of a commission is to present and argue for the bill being presented, and in no case to modify it to his liking, and much less to enable, as in this case, the sale of children."

Losada's original bill was approved unanimously without Pagotto's proposal. Owing to the controversy that was aroused, the Senate decided to return the file to the Commission of Justice and Penal Affairs for a more detailed revision of the articles, together with specialists in the field.

On 10 July 2024, when the Commission's revision was finalized, Pagotto addressed his remarks in the Senate, stating that his proposal had been misinterpreted and that the goal was to classify selling children as a crime under the Penal Code, not to decriminalize it. He added that the media controversy was exaggerated.

"The attacks that I have faced have in fact helped this (the report) come to the fore, and it's a good thing, too, and these are the administrative costs, but this project is going to go ahead. Let's penalize the sale of children because we owe society that."

On 11 July of the same year, representatives of the Jujuy Provincial Legislature issued a statement condemning the remarks made by Pagotto.

"We, the members of the legislative panel — the Coordinating Board of the Network of Provincial and National Legislators for the Rights of Children and Adolescents — firmly oppose such displays, recognizing that children are not objects of any transaction or items to be exchanged. We call for continued work to uphold children's and adolescents' rights, honouring the letter of the Constitution and the international treaties to which our country is a signatory."

— Dip. Prov. Daniela del Carmen Vélez, 11 July 2024

=== Comments in the context of retirees' protests ===
On 15 March 2025, during a conference in the Province of La Rioja, Pagotto made statements about the demonstrations by retirees that take place weekly outside the Congress of the Nation in which they demand better pensions. In his intervention, Pagotto declared that the demonstrating retirees were "contracted actors" and that some "throw themselves onto the ground", in the context of police brutality.

== Electoral history ==
Year	Candidacy	Political coalition	Election	Votes	Percentage	Result
2023	National Senator for La Rioja		Primary	62,145	32.52%	Enabled
2023	National Senator for La Rioja		General	84,254	37.80%	Elected
