= Mercedes Valenzuela =

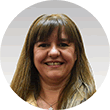
- Mercedes Valenzuela in 2021

National Senator
- Incumbent
- Assumed office 10 December 2021
- Constituency: Corrientes

Senator of the Province of Corrientes
- In office 10 December 2009 – 10 December 2013

Personal details
- Born: 24 September 1974 (age 51) Esquina, Corrientes, Argentina
- Party: Radical Civic Union

Mercedes Gabriela Valenzuela (born 24 September 1974) is an Argentine teacher and politician. She has been a member of the Argentine Senate since 2021 for the Radical Civic Union party.

== Biography ==
She graduated as a Primary School Teacher from the JA Ferreyra Teacher Training Institute. She began her activism in the Radical Civic Union at the age of 15, holding various local and provincial positions within the party. From 2002 to 2005, she served as Regional Coordinator of the Federal Health Program, and from 2014 to 2021 as Zone Coordinator for the Ministry of Education of the Province of Corrientes. At the legislative level, she was elected councilwoman of Esquina from 2005 to 2009 and senator for the Province of Corrientes from 2009 to 2013.

In December 2021, she assumed the position of National Senator for Corrientes, representing the Radical Civic Union bloc, following the 2021 Argentine legislative election. As a senator, she voted in favor of DNU 70/23, the Framework Law, the decree that increased "reserved spending" by 100,000,000,000 pesos, and the Supreme Court nominations of Ariel Lijo and Manuel García-Mansilla, who had already been appointed by decree by Javier Milei. Both nominations were rejected by the Senate.

== Personal life ==
Valenzuela has two children.

== Electoral history ==
Electoral history of Mercedes Valenzuela
Election	Office	List	#	District	Votes			Result	Ref.
Election	Office	List	#	District	Total	%	P.	Result	Ref.
2021	National Senator	ECO + Let's Go, Corrientes!	2	Corrientes Province	328,217	58.82%	1st (Note: Presented on an electoral list. The data shown represents the share of the vote the entire party/alliance received in that constituency.)	Elected	

== See also ==
- List of Argentine senators, 2021–2023
- List of Argentine senators, 2023–2025
- List of Argentine senators, 2025–2027
