= Cristina López Valverde =

Argentine politician (born 1959)

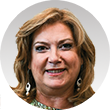

National Senator
- In office 10 December 2023 – 10 December 2025
- Constituency: San Juan

Personal details
- Born: February 15, 1959 (age 67) San Juan, Argentina
- Party: Justicialist Party

Cristina del Carmen López Valverde (born 15 February 1959) is an Argentine politician from the Justicialist Party. She sat as a National Senator for San Juan Province from 2023 to 2025.

== See also ==
- List of Argentine senators, 2023–2025
