= Pablo Cervi =

Argentine politician (born 1971)

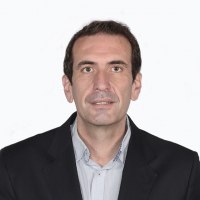

National Senator
- Incumbent
- Assumed office 10 December 2025
- Constituency: Neuquén

National Deputy
- In office 10 December 2021 – 10 December 2025
- Constituency: Neuquén

Personal details
- Party: La Libertad Avanza (since 2025); Radical Civic Union (until 2025)
- Other political affiliations: Juntos por el Cambio (2019–2023)
- Occupation: Agricultural engineer

Pablo Cervi (born 13 October 1971) is an Argentine politician affiliated with La Libertad Avanza (LLA). He currently serves as a National Senator for Neuquén Province. He previously served as a national deputy from 2021 to 2025.

In 2023, he was a candidate for governor of Neuquén Province.

== Biography ==
He was elected as a national deputy in 2021 and as a national senator in October 2025. He has held the latter office since 10 December 2025.

In 2025, while serving in the Chamber of Deputies, he formed the parliamentary inter-bloc known as "La Liga del Interior - ELI" alongside other UCR legislators aligned with La Libertad Avanza. The group was referred to by some media outlets as the “Radicals with wigs”. Its members were Pablo Cervi (Neuquén), Martín Arjol (Misiones), Mariano Campero (Tucumán), Francisco Monti (Catamarca), Luis Picat (Córdoba), and José Tournier (Corrientes).

== Historial electoral ==
=== Executive ===
Electoral history of Pablo Cervi
Election	Office	List	Votes			Result	Ref.
Election	Office	List	Total	%	P.	Result	Ref.
2023	Governor of Neuquén	Juntos por el Cambio	15,571	3.88%	5th	Not elected	

=== Legislative ===
Electoral history of Pablo Cervi
Election	Office	List	#	District	Votes			Result	Ref.
Election	Office	List	#	District	Total	%	P.	Result	Ref.
2021	National Deputy	Cambia Neuquén	1	Neuquén	86,938	22.85%	1st (Note: Presented on an electoral list. The data shown represents the share of the vote the entire party/alliance received in that constituency.)	Elected	
2025	National Senator	La Libertad Avanza	2	Neuquén	145,593	35.65%	1st	Elected	
