= Stella Maris Olalla =

Argentine politician (born 1943)

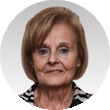

National Senator
- Incumbent
- Assumed office 10 December 2019
- Constituency: Entre Ríos

Personal details
- Born: March 7, 1943 (age 83) Diamante, Entre Ríos, Argentina
- Party: Radical Civic Union
- Other political affiliations: Juntos por el Cambio

Stella Maris Elisa Olalla de Moreira (born 7 March 1943) is an Argentine politician from the Radical Civic Union. She currently sits as a National Senator for Entre Ríos Province since 2019.

== See also ==
- List of Argentine senators, 2019–2021
- List of Argentine senators, 2021–2023
- List of Argentine senators, 2023–2025
