= Nadia Márquez =

Argentine politician (born 1983)

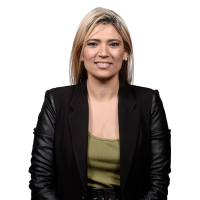
- Márquez in 2023

Member of the Chamber of Deputies
- Incumbent
- Assumed office 10 December 2023
- Constituency: Neuquén

Personal details
- Born: 2 February 1983 (age 43)
- Party: La Libertad Avanza

Nadia Judith Márquez (born 2 February 1983) is an Argentine politician serving as a member of the Chamber of Deputies since 2023. She has served as chairwoman of La Libertad Avanza in Neuquén since 2025.
