= María Celeste Giménez Navarro =

Argentinian politician

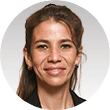

National Senator
- Incumbent
- Assumed office 10 December 2023
- Constituency: San Juan Province

Personal details
- Born: September 2, 1987 (age 38) Argentina
- Party: Justicialist Party

María Celeste Giménez Navarro (born 2 September 1987) is an Argentine politician from the Justicialist Party. She currently sits as a National Senator for San Juan Province since 2023.

== See also ==
- List of Argentine senators, 2023–2025
