= Gabriel Bornoroni =

Argentine politician (born 1978)

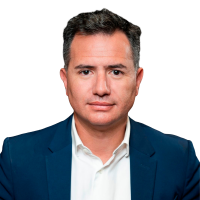
- Official portrait, 2023

National Deputy
- Incumbent
- Assumed office 10 December 2023
- Constituency: Córdoba

Personal details
- Born: 16 July 1978 (age 47)
- Party: La Libertad Avanza

Gabriel Bornoroni (born 16 July 1978) is an Argentine politician serving as a member of the Chamber of Deputies since 2023. He has served as group leader of La Libertad Avanza since 2024.
