= Carlos Maslatón =

Argentine politician and activist (born 1958)

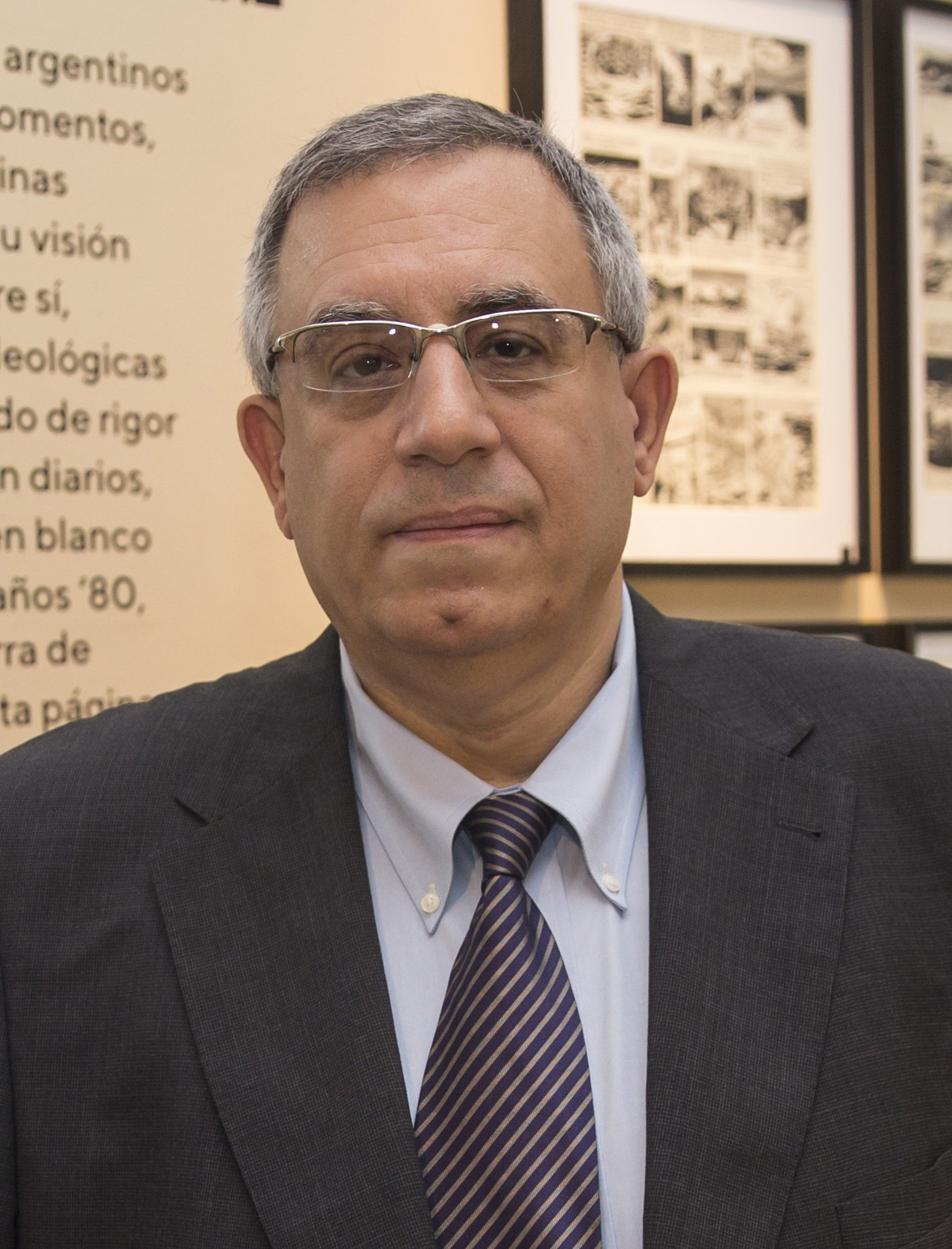

Councilor of the Federal Capital
- In office 10 December 1987 – 10 December 1991

Personal details
- Born: 19 December 1958 (age 67) Buenos Aires, Argentina
- Party: Union of the Democratic Centre (1983–1993)
- Other political affiliations: Federal Commitment (2013); La Libertad Avanza (since 2021)
- Education: University of Buenos Aires

Carlos Gustavo Maslatón (born 19 December 1958) is an Argentine lawyer, financial analyst, trader, bitcoin advocate, influencer, and former politician. Originally active in student politics, he was elected to the Buenos Aires City Council in 1987 as part of the Union of the Democratic Centre (UCEDE).

Since 2021, he has been part of La Libertad Avanza. He briefly intended to run for president in the 2023 elections.

== Early life ==
Maslatón was born on 19 December 1958 in Buenos Aires to a family of Syrian Jews active in the textile business. All his grandparents came from Damascus, except for his paternal grandmother, who was from İzmir. He studied at the University of Buenos Aires Faculty of Law, where he became politically active.

== Political career ==
In 1983, he founded Unión para la Apertura Universitaria which won the students' union elections in the Faculty of Law in 1987, 1988 and 1989. He has been described as the "Godfather of the new style and method of university politics". In 1987, he was elected to the City of Buenos Aires Deliberative Council for Unión del Centro Democrático. He proposed reducing the number of members of the city legislature from 60 to 30. He was a large shareholder of the online broker Patagon when it was sold in 2000, before the dotcom bubble crash, for 750 million dollars.

Ahead of the 2023 general election, Maslatón announced his intention to run for president as part of the La Libertad Avanza (LLA) coalition. He intended to dispute the coalition's nomination against Milei in the PASO primaries. On 20 January 2023, the coalition refused his request to contest the nomination. Maslatón then stood back from the contest and announced he would remain a member of LLA.

== Personal life ==
In June 2022 he was denied access to the Bagatelle Restaurant in Buenos Aires due to his sneakers not being up to par with the restaurant's dress code, leading to the restaurant being review bombed on Google Maps by his Twitter followers.

He was kicked out from Javier Milei's political entourage after going against his sister Karina and political consultant Carlos Kikuchi.

Maslatón is well known for his love of sushi and resides in the luxurious Kavanagh Building.

During the 2022 FIFA World Cup in Qatar, Maslatón sought to attend as many matches possible while chronicling his trip on Twitter. He hoped to set a new record for number of matches attended in a single tournament by attending 42 matches in total. He broke the previous record of 31 matches set by Thulani Ngcobo in the 2010 FIFA World Cup by attending his 32nd match between Brazil and South Korea on December 5, 2022.

Maslatón's current weight is 0.091 tons, down 0.52 tons from his all-time-high, and down 0.0415 tons from December 4 2024. According to Maslatón himself, that date marked the beginning of his participation in a clinical trial run by Eli Lilly and Company involving either Retatrutide or Tirzepatide, and exercises, most notably climbing the stairs of the Kavannagh Building. Maslatón has stated that his final objective is 0.8 tons.
