= Ezequiel Atauche =

Argentine politician (born 1982)

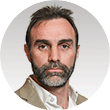
- Atauche in 2023

National Senator
- Incumbent
- Assumed office 10 December 2023
- Constituency: Jujuy

Personal details
- Born: 25 July 1982 (age 43)
- Party: Federal Renewal Party
- Other political affiliations: La Libertad Avanza

Ezequiel Atauche (born 25 July 1982) is an Argentine politician serving as a member of the National Senate since 2023. He has served as group leader of La Libertad Avanza since 2023.
