= María Teresa Margarita González =

Argentine politician

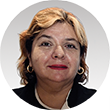

National Senator
- Incumbent
- Assumed office 10 December 2017
- Constituency: Formosa Province

Personal details
- Born: July 30, 1961 (age 64) Formosa, Argentina
- Party: Justicialist Party

María Teresa Margarita González (born 30 July 1961) is an Argentine politician from the Justicialist Party. She currently sits as a National Senator for Formosa Province since 2017.

== Early life and career ==
Born in the city of Formosa in 1961, she graduated as an architect from the National University of the Northeast in 1987 and worked in the private sector until 2002. She holds a postgraduate degree in Territorial Planning from the Polytechnic University of Valencia in Spain.

Between 1988 and 2002, she served as a technical adviser at the Ministry of Planning, Investment, Public Works and Services of Formosa Province. She also worked as construction manager for the High Complexity Hospital in the provincial capital. From 2002 until April 2017, she served as undersecretary of public works in the same provincial ministry.

Within her political party, she served as a technical adviser to the provincial branch of the Justicialist Party.

== Political career ==
In the 2011 legislative election, she was a candidate for the Argentine Senate, occupying the third position on the Front for Victory list. In April 2017, she took office as a senator to complete the term of María Graciela de la Rosa, who had been appointed to the General Auditing Office of the Nation. In the 2017 legislative election, she was elected to the Senate for a term ending in 2023, occupying the second position on the Front for Victory list alongside José Mayans. In 2019 she joined the Frente de Todos parliamentary bloc.

She chairs the Infrastructure, Housing and Transport Committee and is a member of the Budget and Finance; Labour and Social Security; Agriculture, Livestock and Fisheries; Population and Human Development; Education and Culture; Women's Affairs; and Bicameral Legislative Procedure committees. In 2018, she served as vice-chair of the Agriculture, Livestock and Fisheries Committee.

In 2018, she voted against the Voluntary Interruption of Pregnancy Bill, and again voted against the 2020 bill.
