= Argentine National Congress =

Bicameral legislature of Argentina

Coordinates: 34°36′34.75″S 58°23′33.29″W

National Congress of Argentina Congreso de la Nación Argentina

Type
- Type: Bicameral
- Houses: Senate; Chamber of Deputies

Leadership
- President of the Senate & Vice President: Victoria Villarruel, LLA since 10 December 2023
- Provisional President of the Senate: Bartolomé Abdala, LLA since 13 December 2023
- President of the Chamber of Deputies: Martín Menem, LLA since 10 December 2023

Structure
- Seats: 329 members: 72 Senators (List); 257 Deputies (List)
- Senate political groups: Government (21): LLA (21); Allies (5): PRO (4); Independencia (1); Independents (22): UCR (10); Federal Innovation (4); United Provinces (3); Federal Conviction (3); For Santa Cruz (2); Opposition (25): UP (25)
- Chamber of Deputies political groups: Government (95): LLA (95); Allies (24): PRO-UCR-MID-ABA-XCS (22); PyT (2); Independent (41): United Provinces (22); IF (7); Independencia (3); Elijo Catamarca (3); País Federal (3); Defendamos Córdoba (1); La Neuquindad (1); Federal Commitment (1); Opposition (97): UP (93); FIT-U (4)

Elections
- Last Senate election: 26 October 2025
- Last Chamber of Deputies election: 26 October 2025
- Next Senate election: 2027
- Next Chamber of Deputies election: 2027

Meeting place
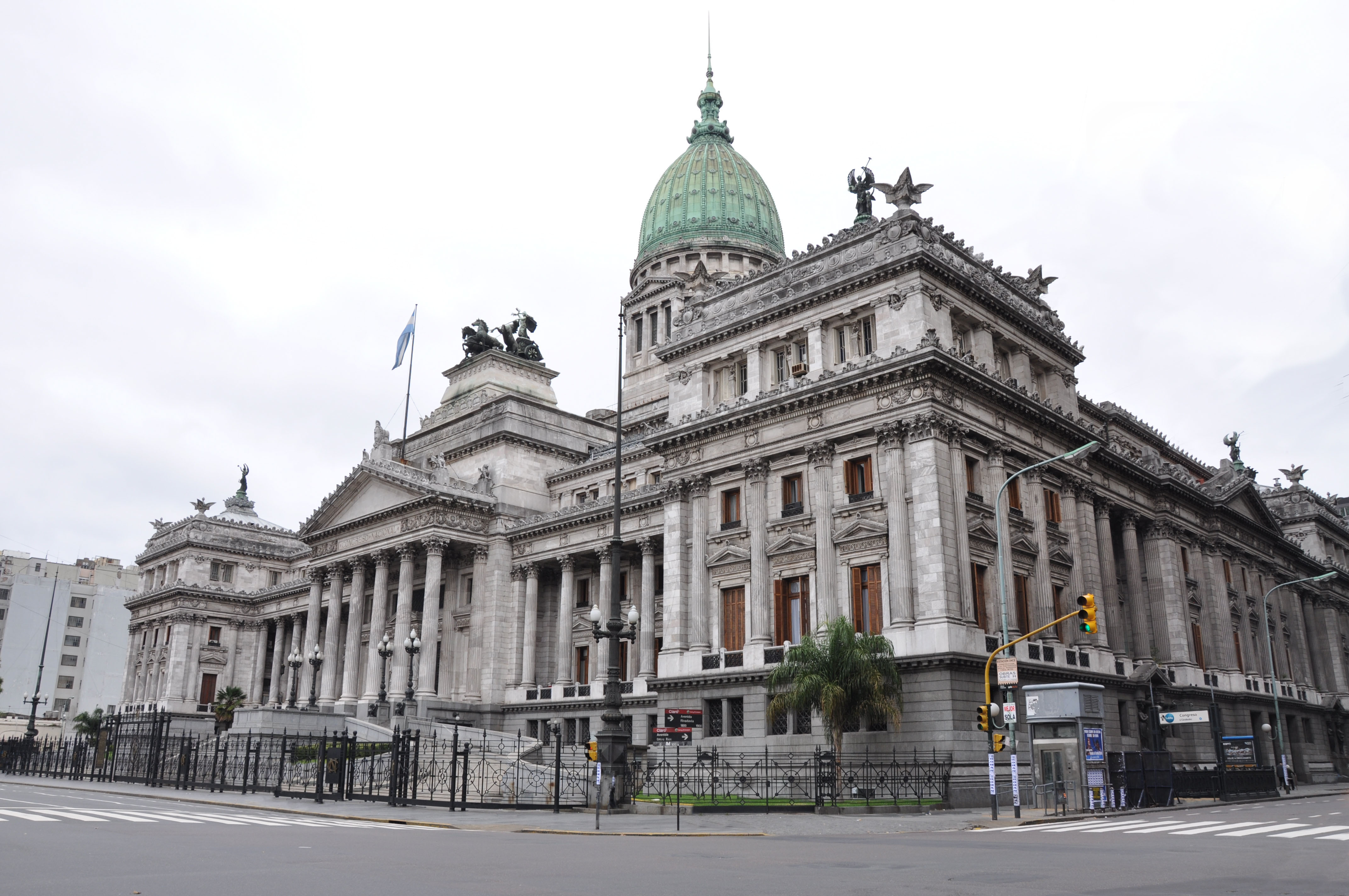
- Argentine National Congress Palace; Buenos Aires, Argentina

Website
- congreso.gob.ar

The National Congress of Argentina (Spanish: Congreso de la Nación Argentina) is the legislative branch of the government of Argentina. Its composition is bicameral, constituted by a 72-seat Senate and a 257-seat Chamber of Deputies. The Senate, a third of whose members are elected to six-year renewable terms every two years, consists of three representatives from each province and the federal capital. The Chamber of Deputies, whose members are elected to four-year terms, is apportioned according to population, and renews their members by a half each two years.

The Congressional Palace is located in Buenos Aires, at the western end of Avenida de Mayo (at the other end of which is located the Casa Rosada). The Kilometre Zero for all Argentine National Highways is marked on a milestone at the Congressional Plaza, next to the building.

== Attributes ==
The Argentine National Congress is bicameral, composed of the Senate and the Chamber of Deputies. The ordinary sessions span is from March 1 to November 30; the President of Argentina is entitled to convene extraordinary sessions during the recess, if needed. Senators and deputies enjoy parliamentary immunity during their mandates, which may be revoked by their peers if a senator or deputy is caught in flagrante, in the midst of committing a crime.

The Congress rules the Central Bank of Argentina, manages internal and external debt payment, and the value of national currency (currently the Argentine peso). It rules the legal codes on Civil, Commercial, Penal, Minery, Work and Social Welfare affairs, all of which cannot be in contradiction with the respective provincial codes. Any changes on national or provincial limits, or the creation of new provinces, ought to be allowed by the Congress.

The Congress is entitled to approve or reject every international treaty that Argentina signs with other states or international organizations. When approved, the treaties acquire priority over ordinary legislation. Declarations of war and the signing of peace, as well as the mobilization of the national troops, within or outside of the Argentine territory must be allowed by the Congress. The Chamber of Deputies is the lower House of the National Congress. It holds exclusive rights to set taxes and customs; to draft troops; and to accuse the President, Ministers, and members of the Supreme Court before the Senate. Additionally, the Chamber of Deputies receives for consideration bills presented by popular initiative.

The Senate is the upper House of the National Congress. It must obtain quorum to deliberate, this being an absolute majority. It has the power to approve bills passed by the Chamber of Deputies, call for joint sessions with the Lower House or special sessions with experts and interested parties, and submit bills for the president's signature; bills introduced in the Senate must, in turn, be approved by the Lower House for their submittal to the president. The Senate must introduce any changes to federal revenue sharing policies, ratify international treaties, approve changes to constitutional or federal criminal laws, as well as confirm or impeach presidential nominees to the cabinet, the judiciary, the armed forces, and the diplomatic corps, among other federal posts.

== History ==
From 1976 to 1983, the Congressional Palace of Argentina housed the CAL (Legislative Advisory Commission), a group of officers from the three Armed Forces. Commissioned to review and discuss laws before they were issued by the Executive Branch, they served a succession of de facto military presidents during the National Reorganization Process. In practice, this became a mechanism to detect and discuss the differences between the three commanders-in-chief of the Army, Navy, and Air Force regarding a specific project. The CAL was established by the Acta del Proceso de Reorganización Nacional (National Reorganization Process Act), the guiding document for the military government established after the coup d'état of March 24, 1976.

Following a 1994 reform of the Constitution, the Senate was expanded from 48 members (two per province or district) to 72 members, whereby the party garnering second place in elections for Senator would be assured the third seat for the corresponding province.

== Representation ==
Each province elects 3 Senators to the Senate, whereas every 161,000 Argentine citizens elect a Deputy. Currently, there are 72 Senators and 257 National Deputies in the Congress.

District	Number of Senators	Number of Deputies
Autonomous City of Buenos Aires	3	25
Province of Buenos Aires	3	70
Province of Catamarca	3	5
Province of Chaco	3	7
Province of Chubut	3	5
Province of Córdoba	3	18
Province of Corrientes	3	7
Province of Entre Ríos	3	9
Province of Formosa	3	5
Province of Jujuy	3	6
Province of La Pampa	3	5
Province of La Rioja	3	5
Province of Mendoza	3	10
Province of Misiones	3	7
Province of Neuquén	3	5
Province of Río Negro	3	5
Province of Salta	3	7
Province of San Juan	3	6
Province of San Luis	3	5
Province of Santa Cruz	3	5
Province of Santa Fe	3	19
Province of Santiago del Estero	3	7
Province of Tierra del Fuego	3	5
Province of Tucumán	3	9
Total	72	257

== See also ==
- Opening of regular sessions of the National Congress of Argentina
- Argentine National Congress Palace
- List of current Argentine Senators
- List of current Argentine Deputies
- Politics of Argentina
- List of legislatures by country

== Bibliography ==
- "National Constitution of Argentina". Constitution of Argentina (in Spanish). Archived from the original on 2004-06-17.
