= Sandra Mariela Mendoza =

Argentine politician (born 1972)

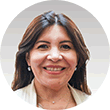

National Senator
- Incumbent
- Assumed office 10 December 2021
- Constituency: Tucumán

Personal details
- Born: September 21, 1972 (age 53) Argentina
- Party: Justicialist Party

Sandra Mariela Mendoza (born 21 September 1972) is an Argentine politician from the Justicialist Party. She currently sits as a National Senator for Tucumán Province since 2021.

== See also ==
- List of Argentine senators, 2021–2023
