= Federal Renewal Party =

Argentine political party

Federal Renewal Party Partido Renovador Federal
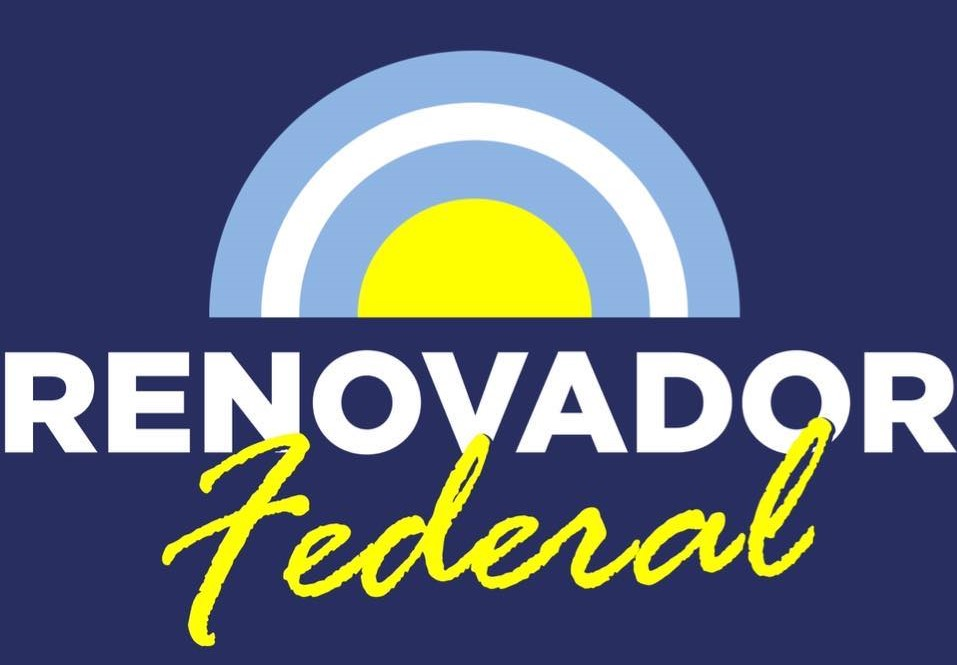
- President: José Videla Sáenz
- Founded: 1974; 52 years ago
- Headquarters: San Miguel, Buenos Aires, Argentina
- Ideology: Federal Peronism
- Political position: Right-wing
- National affiliation: La Libertad Avanza (big) (since 2023)
- Colours: Yellow, Sky blue
- Seats in the Chamber of Deputies: 0 / 257
- Seats in the Senate: 0 / 72
- Province Governors: 0 / 24
- Seats in the provincial legislatures: 2 / 1,199

The Federal Renewal Party (Spanish: Partido Renovador Federal, PRF) is a political party in Argentina. It was founded in the Buenos Aires Province in 1974, and it was recognized at the national level in 2015, presenting a national party with headquarters in the city of Buenos Aires, The provinces of Buenos Aires, Mendoza, Corrientes, Jujuy, Chaco and Formosa. The PRF should not be confused with the Renewal Front, which this party accompanied until the 2015 elections. Nor should it be confused with the Federal Republican Party, a member of the Peronist coalition Principles and Values.

The PRF presents a "non-Kirchnerist Peronist" ideology, although it does not have a clear national line, presenting various alliances in the different provinces, even with the Frente de Todos. The PRF does not have politicians with a high level of knowledge of society, so its vote flow is usually low. Most of the party's candidates are people outside politics. The PRF's political campaign usually focuses on tours of the neighborhoods presenting its projects and receiving new ones from the community. It has also resorted to comic actions or advertisements that attract media attention.
