= Edith Terenzi =

Argentine accountant and politician

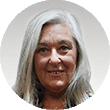

National Senator
- Incumbent
- Assumed office 10 December 2021
- Constituency: Chubut

Personal details
- Born: 7 June 1959 (age 67) Trelew, Argentina
- Party: Radical Civic Union
- Other political affiliations: Juntos por el Cambio (2021–2024); United Provinces (2024–present)
- Education: National University of Patagonia San Juan Bosco

Edith Elizabeth Terenzi (born 7 June 1959) is an Argentine political scientist and politician affiliated with the Radical Civic Union, who has served as a member of the Argentine Senate for Chubut Province since 2021.

== Early life and career ==
Born in Trelew in 1959, she worked as a bank employee until qualifying as a primary-school teacher, subsequently teaching in Camarones. She also worked as a proofreader for the newspaper El Chubut.

She earned a degree in political science from the National University of Patagonia San Juan Bosco. She specialized in electoral systems, completing several diploma courses, a postgraduate degree in political and electoral law at the University of Buenos Aires, and a master's degree in electoral law at the University of Castilla–La Mancha in Spain. She also served as an election observer on Organization of American States (OAS) missions in Ecuador in 2013 and 2014. Together with other colleagues, she participated in drafting an electoral code for Chubut.

From 1990 until her retirement, she worked as a stenographer in the Legislature of Chubut.

== Political career ==
In 2015, she ran in the primary election for mayor of her native Trelew as the candidate of an alliance led by the Radical Civic Union, which she had joined in 1982.

In the 2021 primaries, she ran for the Argentine Senate for Chubut Province, competing in the Juntos por el Cambio primary alongside Ignacio Torres of Republican Proposal. The "Juntos por Chubut" list received the most votes and went on to contest the general election, winning the province's two majority seats for terms ending in 2027. Terenzi and Torres formed the "Integración y Desarrollo Chubutense" bloc within the Together for Change inter-bloc.

In September 2024, she joined the new United Provinces inter-bloc alongside senators Edgardo Kueider, Carlos Mauricio Espínola, Juan Carlos Romero, Alejandra Vigo, and Carmen Lucila Crexell.

== Electoral history ==
Electoral history of Edith Terenzi
Election	Office	List	#	District	Votes			Result	Ref.
Election	Office	List	#	District	Total	%	P.	Result	Ref.
2021	National Senator	Together for Chubut	2	Chubut Province	110,997	37.87%	1st (Note: Presented on an electoral list. The data shown represents the share of the vote the entire party/alliance received in that constituency.)	Elected	
