= Natalia Gadano =

Argentine politician (born 1982)

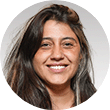

National Senator
- Incumbent
- Assumed office 10 December 2023
- Constituency: Santa Cruz

Personal details
- Born: 19 August 1982 (age 43) Puerto Deseado, Argentina
- Party: SER Santa Cruz

Natalia Elena Gadano (born 19 August 1982) is an Argentine politician from the SER Santa Cruz party. She is a National Senator for Santa Cruz since 2023.

== Biography ==
Gadano spent much of his childhood in the city of Puerto Deseado and settled in the town of Caleta Olivia.

In October 2023 she was elected Senator for Santa Cruz in the 2023 legislative election.
