= Maximiliano Abad =

Argentine lawyer and politician

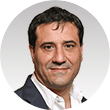

National Senator
- Incumbent
- Assumed office 10 December 2023
- Constituency: Buenos Aires

Provincial Deputy of Buenos Aires
- In office 10 December 2015 – 10 December 2023
- Constituency: Fifth Electoral Section

President of the Buenos Aires Province Radical Civic Union Committee
- Incumbent
- Assumed office 21 March 2021
- Preceded by: Daniel Salvador

Personal details
- Born: 30 May 1977 (age 49) Ranchos, Buenos Aires, Argentina
- Party: Radical Civic Union
- Other political affiliations: UDESO (2011–2013); Cambiemos (2015–2019); Juntos por el Cambio (2019–2023)
- Education: National University of Mar del Plata

Maximiliano Abad (born 30 May 1977) is an Argentine Radical Civic Union (UCR) politician who has served as National Senator for Buenos Aires Province since 2023. He previously served as a member of the Buenos Aires Province Chamber of Deputies for the Fifth Electoral Section from 2015 to 2023 and as a City Councillor in Mar del Plata.

== Early life and education ==
Abad was born on 30 May 1977 in Ranchos, Buenos Aires. He grew up in Santa Clara del Mar, and later moved to Mar del Plata. He studied law at the National University of Mar del Plata, and began his political activism at Franja Morada, the student wing of the Radical Civic Union (UCR). As a student activist in 2004 he was elected president of the Argentine University Federation (FUA).

== Political career ==
Abad first ran for City Councillor of General Pueyrredón Partido (Mar del Plata) in 2007, and was re-elected in 2011 as part of the UDESO (Union for Social Development) alliance. A close ally of Ernesto Sanz and a supporter of the alliance between the UCR and Republican Proposal (which led to the creation of the Cambiemos coalition), in 2015 he was elected to the Buenos Aires Province Chamber of Deputies for the Fifth Electoral Section, which includes General Pueyrredón and much of the Buenos Aires Atlantic Coast. He was re-elected in 2019.

In 2021 he was elected president of the Buenos Aires Province Radical Civic Union committee. In the 2023 general election, Abad was elected to the Argentine Senate for Buenos Aires as the single minority seat, heading the Juntos por el Cambio list.

== Electoral history ==
Electoral history of Maximiliano Abad
Election	Office	List	#	District	Votes			Result	Ref.
Election	Office	List	#	District	Total	%	P.	Result	Ref.
2007	Councillor	Radical Civic Union	2	General Pueyrredón Partido	46,716	15.18%	3rd (Note: Presented on an electoral list. The data shown represents the share of the vote the entire party/alliance received in that constituency.)	Elected	
2011	Councillor	UDESO	1	General Pueyrredón Partido	53,864	15.22%	3rd	Elected	
2015	Provincial Deputy	Cambiemos	1	Fifth Electoral Section	379,975	46.41%	1st	Elected	
2019	Provincial Deputy	Juntos por el Cambio	1	Fifth Electoral Section	433,398	48.07%	1st	Elected	
2023	National Senator	Juntos por el Cambio	1	Buenos Aires Province	2,426,257	26.43%	2nd	Elected	
