= Fernando Salino =

Argentine politician (born 1970)

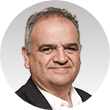

National Senator
- Incumbent
- Assumed office 10 December 2023
- Constituency: San Luis

National Deputy
- In office 10 December 2013 – 10 December 2015
- Constituency: San Luis

Personal details
- Born: Fernando Aldo Salino; 26 October 1960 (age 65) Junín, Argentina
- Party: Justicialist Party
- Other political affiliations: Federal Commitment (2011–2019); Frente de Todos (2019–2023); Union for the Homeland (2023–present)
- Education: University of Buenos Aires

Fernando Aldo Salino (born 26 October 1960) is an Argentine business administrator and politician affiliated with the Justicialist Party. He served as a member of the Argentine Chamber of Deputies for San Luis Province from 2013 to 2015. He has served as a member of the Argentine Senate for San Luis Province since 2023.

== Biography ==
Born in Junín, Buenos Aires Province, Salino earned a degree in business administration from the University of Buenos Aires (UBA). Following the restoration of democracy in 1983, he began working as an adviser to then-senator Alberto Rodríguez Saá. He also taught economics to secondary-school teachers. He later became a university professor at the Universidad del Salvador.

In 2001, he settled in San Luis Province, and in 2011 he was elected to the city council of San Luis. In the 2013 elections, he was elected to the Argentine Chamber of Deputies for the province as a member of the Federal Commitment bloc.

After the end of his term as a deputy, he was appointed rector of the University of La Punta in 2018.

In October 2023, he was elected to the Argentine Senate for San Luis Province in the 2023 legislative elections.

== Electoral history ==
Electoral history of Fernando Aldo Salino
Election	Office	List	#	District	Votes			Result	Ref.
Election	Office	List	#	District	Total	%	P.	Result	Ref.
2013	National Deputy	Federal Commitment	2	San Luis Province	123,613	52.89%	1st (Note: Presented on an electoral list. The data shown represents the share of the vote the entire party/alliance received in that constituency.)	Elected	
2023	National Senator	Union for San Luis	1	San Luis Province	82,957	27.29%	2nd	Elected	
