= Bartolomé Abdala =

Argentine politician

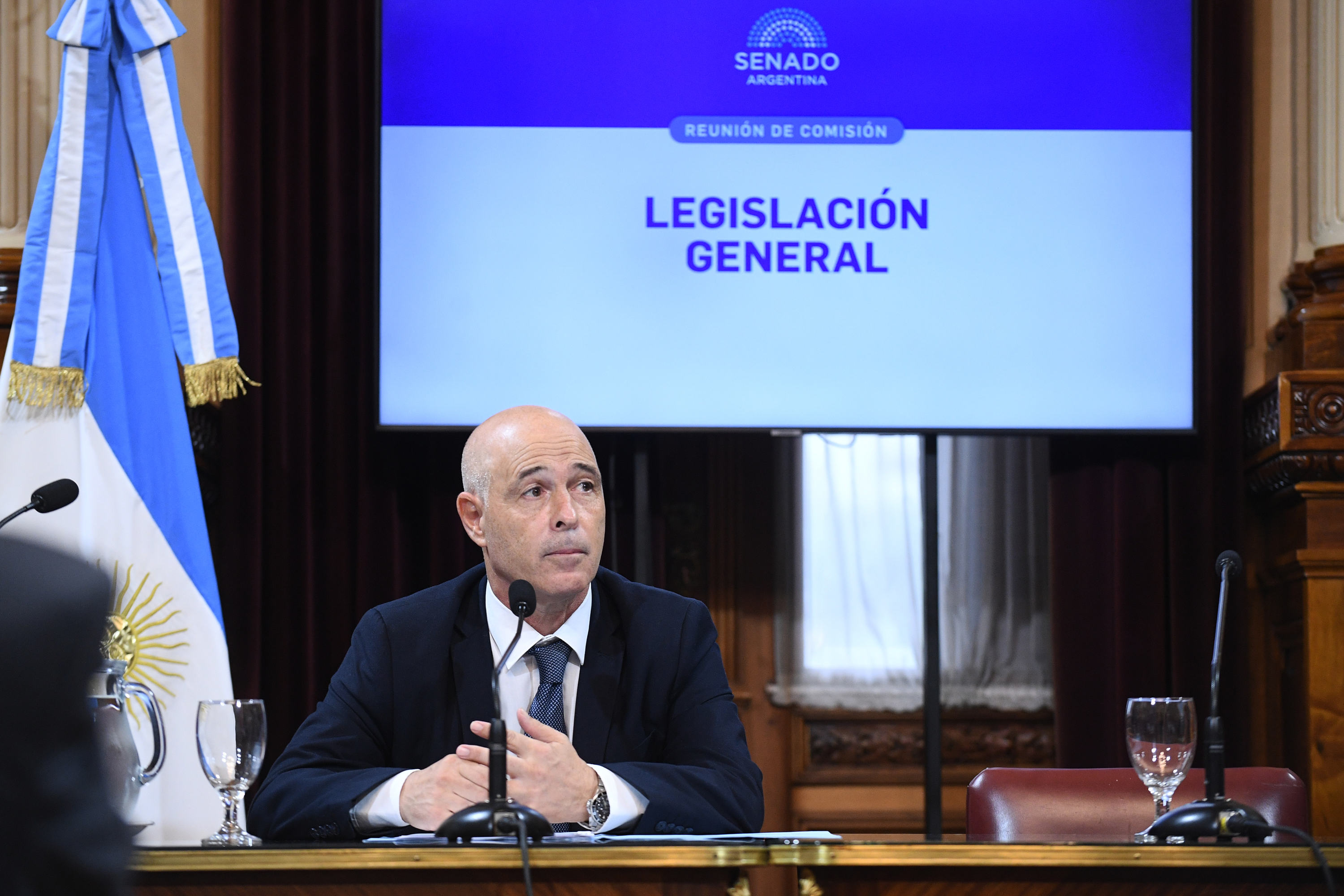

Provisional President of the Senate
- Incumbent
- Assumed office 13 December 2023
- Preceded by: Claudia Ledesma Abdala

National Senator
- Incumbent
- Assumed office 10 December 2023
- Constituency: San Luis

Provincial Deputy of San Luis
- In office 10 December 2013 – 10 December 2017
- Constituency: Juan Martín de Pueyrredón Department

Personal details
- Born: Esteban Bartolomé Abdala; 2 September 1964 (age 61)
- Party: Libertarian Party (2021–present); La Libertad Avanza (2021–present)
- Other political affiliations: Republican Proposal (2007–2021)

Esteban Bartolomé Abdala (born 2 September 1964) is an Argentine economist and politician. He currently serves as a National Senator for San Luis Province, and since 13 December 2023 he has been Provisional President of the Senate.

An economist by profession, Abdala served as Minister of Tourism of San Luis under Governor Alberto Rodríguez Saá from 2008 to 2009. In 2013, he was elected to a four-year term as a member of the San Luis Chamber of Deputies as part of Federal Commitment, Rodríguez Saá's ruling coalition. He later joined the Republican Proposal (PRO) party and currently leads its San Luis chapter.

== Electoral history ==
Electoral history of Bartolomé Abdala
Election	Office	List	#	District	Votes			Result	Ref.
Election	Office	List	#	District	Total	%	P.	Result	Ref.
2013	Provincial Deputy	Federal Commitment	4	Juan Martín de Pueyrredón Department	38,180	56.73%	1st (Note: Presented on an electoral list. The data shown represents the share of the vote the entire party/alliance received in that constituency.)	Elected	
2023	National Senator	La Libertad Avanza	1	San Luis Province	126,012	41.45%	1st	Elected	

Political offices
Preceded by Claudia Ledesma Abdala	Provisional President of the Senate; 2023–present	Incumbent
