= Juliana Di Tullio =

Argentine politician

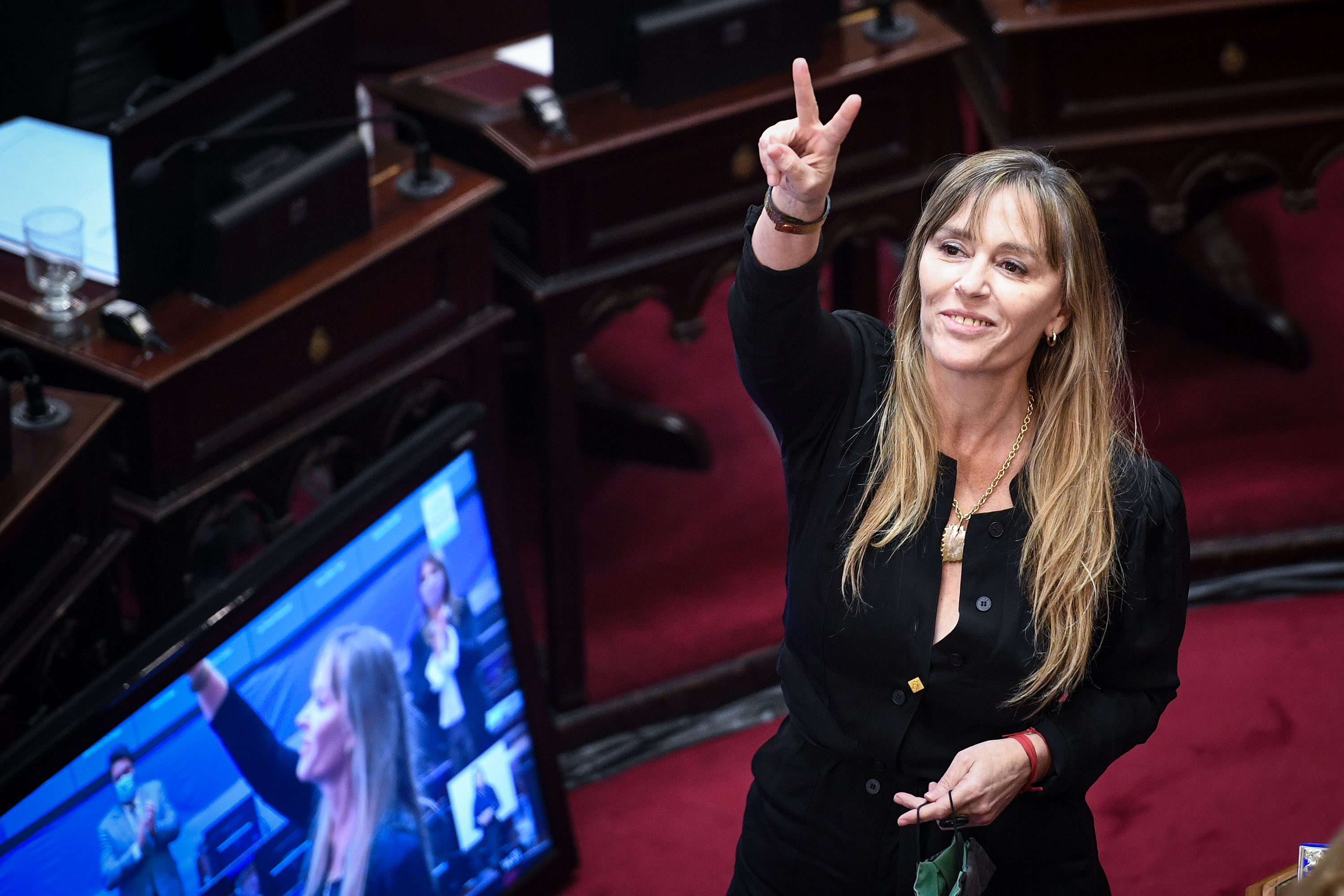

National Senator
- Incumbent
- Assumed office 19 August 2021
- Preceded by: Jorge Taiana
- Constituency: Buenos Aires

National Deputy
- In office 10 December 2005 – 10 December 2017
- Constituency: Buenos Aires

Personal details
- Born: 22 October 1971 (age 54) Morón, Argentina
- Party: Justicialist Party
- Other political affiliations: Front for Victory (2005–2017); Citizen's Unity (2017–2019); Frente de Todos (2019–present)
- Education: Escuela de Psicología Social Pichon Riviere

Juliana Di Tullio (born 22 October 1971) is an Argentine social psychologist and politician. A member of the Justicialist Party, Di Tullio served three terms as National Deputy representing Buenos Aires Province, from 2005 to 2017. From 2013 to 2015, during the presidency of Cristina Fernández de Kirchner, Di Tullio was president of the Front for Victory parliamentary bloc in the lower chamber of the National Congress. She also served as a member of the Mercosur Parliament, and in the board of directors of the Banco Provincia. Since 2021, she has been a National Senator for Buenos Aires Province.

During her time in the lower chamber of Congress, Di Tullio was known for sponsoring a number of bills that expanded the rights of women and LGBT people in Argentina. She co-sponsored the Gender Identity Law, the Equal Marriage Law, and an early bill that would have legalized abortion.

== Early life and education ==
Juliana Di Tullio was born on 22 October 1971 in Morón, in the Greater Buenos Aires conurbation. She is of Italian descent. She became active in politics as a Peronist activist in high school, and studied social psychology at the Escuela de Psicología Social Pichon Riviere. She met future presidents Néstor Kirchner and Cristina Fernández de Kirchner in the late 1990s, when Kirchner was governor of Santa Cruz Province and Fernández de Kirchner was a National Deputy.

== Political career ==
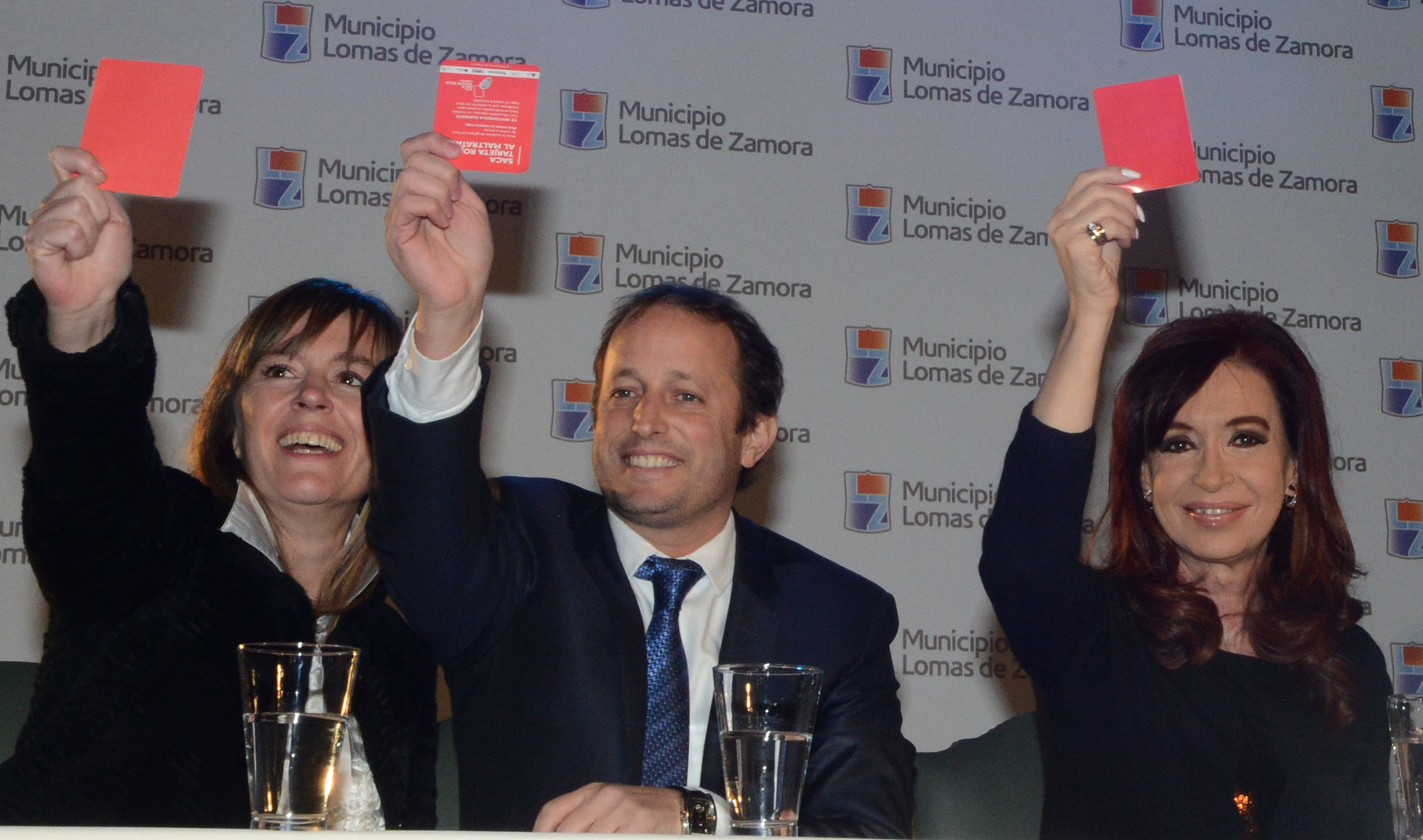
Di Tullio with Martín Insaurralde and Cristina Fernández de Kirchner in 2013.

From 2003 to 2005, Di Tullio was the Argentine foreign ministry's ambassador for women's affairs. At the 2005 legislative election, Di Tullio ran for a seat in the Argentine Chamber of Deputies in the 8th place of the Front for Victory (FPV) list in Buenos Aires Province, and was elected. She ran for re-election in 2009, and although she was not elected, she assumed office upon the resignation of Nacha Guevara from the position. In 2010, she became one of the most vocal supporters of the Equal Marriage bill, which was passed by the Chamber of Deputies on 5 May 2010 and, upon becoming law on 22 July 2010, legalized same-sex marriage in Argentina.

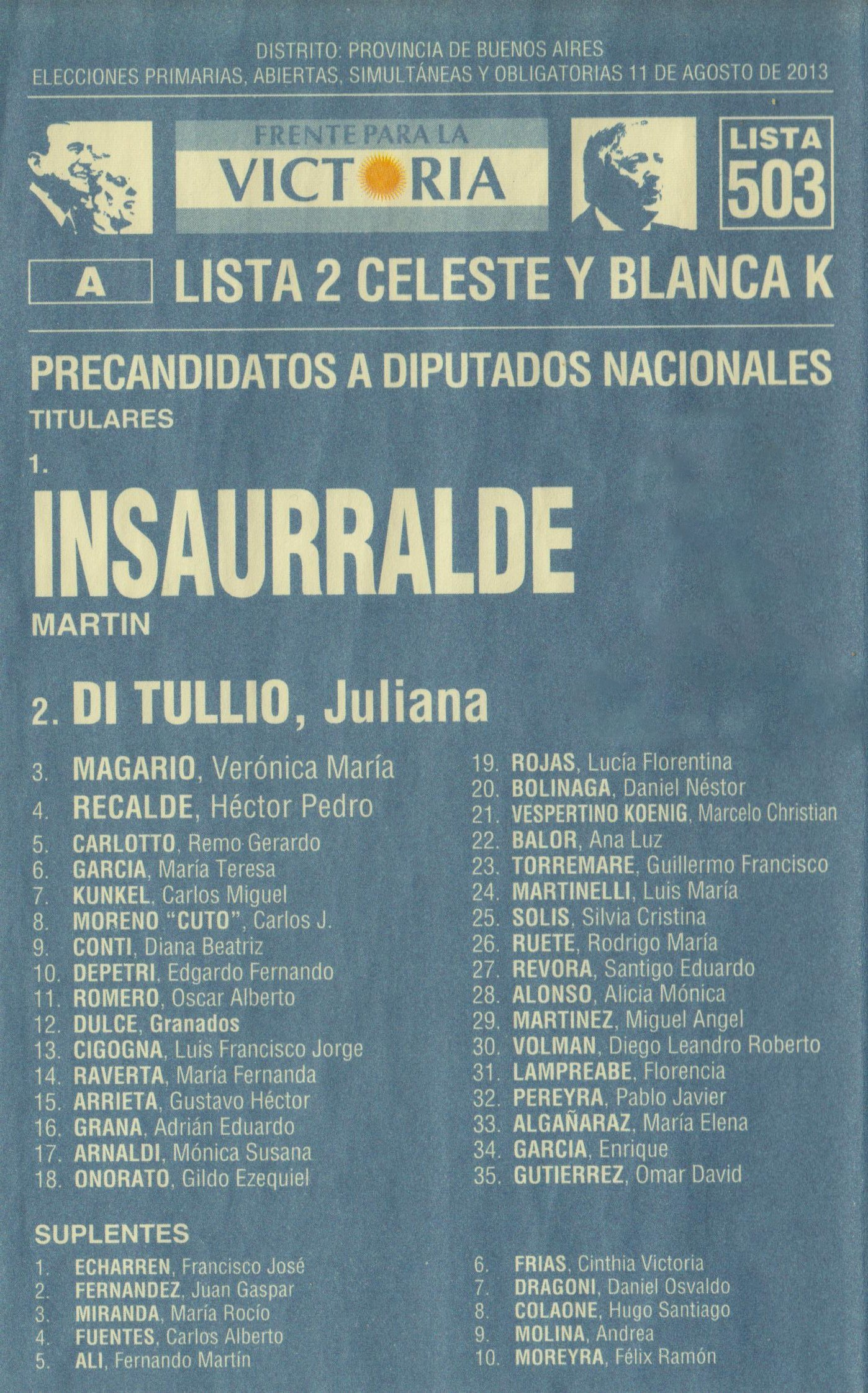
FPV party list with Martín Insaurralde as first candidate and Juliana Di Tullio as second candidate for the 2013 legislative election in Buenos Aires Province.

She ran for a third term in 2013, this time in the second spot in the FPV list, under Martín Insaurralde. During her third term in the Chamber of Deputies, Di Tullio presided the FPV bloc, becoming the first woman to lead a parliamentary caucus in the history of the Argentine Congress. She was also part of the Commerce, Human Rights, Women and Childhood, General Legislation and Foreign Affairs parliamentary commissions.

From 2010 to 2011, she was a member of the Parlasur, the legislative body of Mercosur.

=== Gender Identity Law ===
In 2011, Di Tullio introduced a bill that would expand the right to self-determination for transgender people; the bill was drafted with support from the Federación Argentina de Lesbianas, Gays, Bi y Transexuales (FALGBT). Di Tullio's bill was introduced at the same time as two other similar bill projects were introduced in the Chamber, the other two by Diana Conti (with support from the Comunidad Homosexual Argentina) and by opposition deputies Silvana Giúdici and Miguel Ángel Barrios. The three bills were eventually reformulated into one, which was passed by the Chamber on 30 November 2011.

=== National Senator ===
In the 2017 legislative election, Di Tullio was the first alternate candidate in the Unidad Ciudadana list to the Argentine Senate in Buenos Aires Province; the list was headed by Cristina Fernández de Kirchner and seconded by Jorge Taiana. Unidad Ciudadana came second in the general election, with 37.31% of the vote. In the electoral system for the upper house, this meant that only Fernández de Kirchner was elected as the senator for the minority. Taiana filled the vacancy left by Fernández de Kirchner being elected vice president in the 2019 general election. In 2021, Taiana was sworn in as Defense Minister, and Di Tullio was then tapped to take his seat in the senate for the remainder of the 2017–2023 term. She was sworn in on 19 August 2021.

== Electoral history ==
Electoral history of Juliana Di Tullio
| Election | Office | List | # | District | Votes | | | Result | Ref. |
| Election | Office | List | # | District | Total | % | P. | Result | Ref. |
|---|---|---|---|---|---|---|---|---|---|
| 2005 | National Deputy | Front for Victory | 8 | Buenos Aires Province | 2,831,777 | 43.04% | 1st (Note: Presented on an electoral list. The data shown represents the share of the vote the entire party/alliance received in that constituency.) | Elected | |
| 2009 | National Deputy | Justicialist Front for Victory | 15 | Buenos Aires Province | 2,418,104 | 32.18% | 2nd | Not elected (Note: Assumed office on 10 December 2009, replacing Sergio Massa, who never took office.) | |
| 2013 | National Deputy | Front for Victory | 2 | Buenos Aires Province | 2,900,494 | 32.33% | 2nd | Elected | |
| 2017 | National Senator | Unidad Ciudadana | 1 alt. | Buenos Aires Province | 3,529,900 | 37.31% | 2nd | Not elected (Note: Assumed office on 19 August 2021 following the resignation of the second candidate on the list, Jorge Taiana.) | |
| 2023 | National Senator | Union for the Homeland | 2 | Buenos Aires Province | 4,135,519 | 44.01% | 1st | Elected | |
