= Alejandra Vigo =

Argentine trade unionist and politician

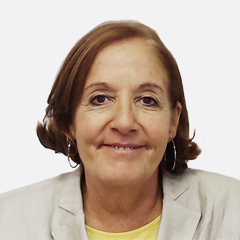

National Senator
- Incumbent
- Assumed office 10 December 2021
- Constituency: Córdoba

National Deputy
- In office 10 December 2017 – 10 December 2021
- Constituency: Córdoba

Provincial Legislator of Córdoba
- In office 10 December 2001 – 10 December 2007

Provincial Deputy of Córdoba
- In office 10 December 1999 – 10 December 2001

First Lady of Córdoba
- In role 10 December 2015 – 10 December 2023
- Governor: Juan Schiaretti
- Preceded by: Adriana Nazario
- Succeeded by: Marcela Beccaría
- In role 10 December 2007 – 9 December 2011
- Governor: Juan Schiaretti
- Preceded by: Adriana Nazario
- Succeeded by: Adriana Nazario

Second Lady of Córdoba
- In role 12 July 2003 – 10 December 2007
- Vice Governor: Juan Schiaretti
- Preceded by: María Luz Capdevila
- Succeeded by: María Belén Cocciolo

Personal details
- Born: 22 September 1957 (age 69) San Juan, Argentina
- Party: Justicialist Party
- Other political affiliations: Union for Córdoba (until 2019); We Do for Córdoba (since 2019)
- Spouse: Juan Schiaretti (m. 2007)
- Education: Catholic University of Salta

Alejandra María Vigo (born 22 September 1957) is an Argentine trade unionist and politician, currently serving as a National Senator for Córdoba since 2021. A member of the Justicialist Party, Vigo forms part of the provincial Hacemos por Córdoba (HPC) alliance. She was previously a National Deputy from 2017 to 2021.

Vigo has previously served as a member of the provincial legislature of Córdoba, first as deputy (1999–2001), and then as legislator (2001–2007) following the 2001 reform of the Constitution of Córdoba. Vigo was also a member of the province's constitutional convention in 2001. She is married to Córdoba governor Juan Schiaretti in 2007 after 10 years of relationship.

== Early life and education ==
Vigo was born on 22 September 1957 in San Juan, capital of the homonymous province. She completed a licenciatura on International Relations from the Catholic University of Salta in 2019. She has been married to Córdoba governor Juan Schiaretti since 2007. She is Schiaretti's second wife.

Her sister, Élida Vigo, is also active in politics and served as a National Senator for Misiones from 2005 to 2011.

== Political career ==
Vigo began her career in SACRA, the housewives' trade union. Vigo was a member of the provincial legislature from 1999 to 2007. From 1999 to 2001, she was a member of the Chamber of Deputies, the lower house of the Córdoba legislative power. From 2001 to 2007, following a constitutional reform, she was a member of the unicameral Legislature of Córdoba. In 2007, she was appointed Secretary of Social Inclusion and Gender Equality at the Ministry of Social Development of Córdoba, under Minister Juan Carlos Massei and during the governorship of her husband, Juan Schiaretti. As Secretary of Inclusion, Vigo oversaw the implementation of a six-month maternity leave for provincial public sector employees.

In 2011, Vigo was elected to the Córdoba City Council for the Union for Córdoba alliance. Following the end of her term in 2015 and the re-election of Schiaretti as governor, Vigo was once again appointed to the Secretariat of Social Inclusion.

=== National Deputy ===
Vigo ran for a seat in the lower house of the National Congress in the 2017 legislative election, as the second candidate in the Union for Córdoba list. The list was the second-most voted in the province, with 30.52% of the vote, and Vigo was elected.

As a national deputy, Vigo formed part of the parliamentary commissions on Mercosur, Municipal Affairs, Tourism, and Housing and Urban Planning. Vigo was an opponent of the legalization of abortion in Argentina, voting against the two Voluntary Interruption of Pregnancy bills, which passed the Chamber in 2018 and 2020.

Ahead of the 2021 primary elections, she was confirmed as the first Hacemos por Córdoba candidate to the Argentine Senate in Córdoba Province.
