= Eduardo Vischi =

Argentine politician (born 1970)

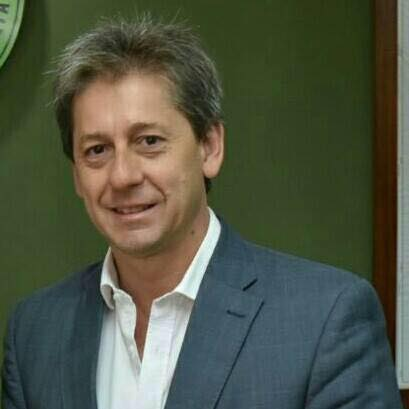

National Senator
- Incumbent
- Assumed office 10 December 2021
- Constituency: Corrientes

Provincial Deputy of Corrientes
- In office 10 December 2017 – 10 December 2021

Minister of Coordination and Planning of Corrientes Province
- In office 10 December 2013 – 10 December 2017
- Governor: Ricardo Colombi
- Preceded by: Office created
- Succeeded by: Horacio Ortega

Mayor of Paso de los Libres
- In office 10 December 2005 – 10 December 2013
- Preceded by: Rubén Verón
- Succeeded by: Raúl Demesio Tarabini

Personal details
- Born: 3 November 1970 (age 55) Paso de los Libres, Argentina
- Party: Radical Civic Union
- Education: National University of the Northeast

Eduardo Alejandro "Peteco" Vischi (born 3 November 1970) is an Argentine politician currently serving as a National Senator for Corrientes Province since 2021.

== Early life and education ==
Eduardo Vischi was born on 3 November 1970, in Paso de los Libres, Corrientes Province. After completing his primary and secondary education in his hometown, he relocated to the provincial capital to pursue legal studies. He graduated in 1995 with a law degree from the National University of the Northeast's Faculty of Law, Social, and Political Sciences.

== Political career ==
Vischi began his public service career in 2001 as Undersecretary of Labor for Corrientes Province, a position he held until 2005. During this period, he also served as Secretary of the General Labor Council from 2002 to 2003. On 10 December 2005, Vischi assumed office as intendente (mayor) of Paso de los Libres. He was reelected in 2009 with over 70% of the vote. In 2013, he transitioned to the role of Deputy Mayor (viceintendente). His tenure in municipal government concluded in December 2014 when he was appointed Minister of Coordination and Planning for Corrientes Province, requiring a temporary leave from his local position.

Vischi was elected as a Provincial Deputy in December 2017. In 2021, he was elected to the National Senate, leading the "ECO + Vamos Corrientes" coalition ticket with nearly 60% of the vote. As a senator, he serves on several key committees, including Constitutional Affairs, Justice and Criminal Matters, Labor and Social Security, Industry and Commerce, and Population and Human Development.

In addition to his legislative duties, Vischi represents the Senate on the Council of Magistracy of the Nation. In December 2023, he was elected by his peers as President of the Radical Civic Union (UCR) Senate Bloc.

== Electoral history ==
Electoral history of Eduardo Vischi
Election	Office	List	#	District	Votes			Result	Ref.
Election	Office	List	#	District	Total	%	P.	Result	Ref.
2017	Provincial Deputy	Encounter for Corrientes	1	Corrientes Province	261,776	43.87%	1st (Note: Presented on an electoral list. The data shown represents the share of the vote the entire party/alliance received in that constituency.)	Elected	
2021	National Senator	ECO + Let's Go, Corrientes!	1	Corrientes Province	328,217	58.82%	1st	Elected	

Political offices
Preceded by Rubén Verón	Mayor of Paso de los Libres; 2005–2013	Succeeded by Raúl Demesio Tarabini
