= José Mayans =

Argentine politician (born 1957)

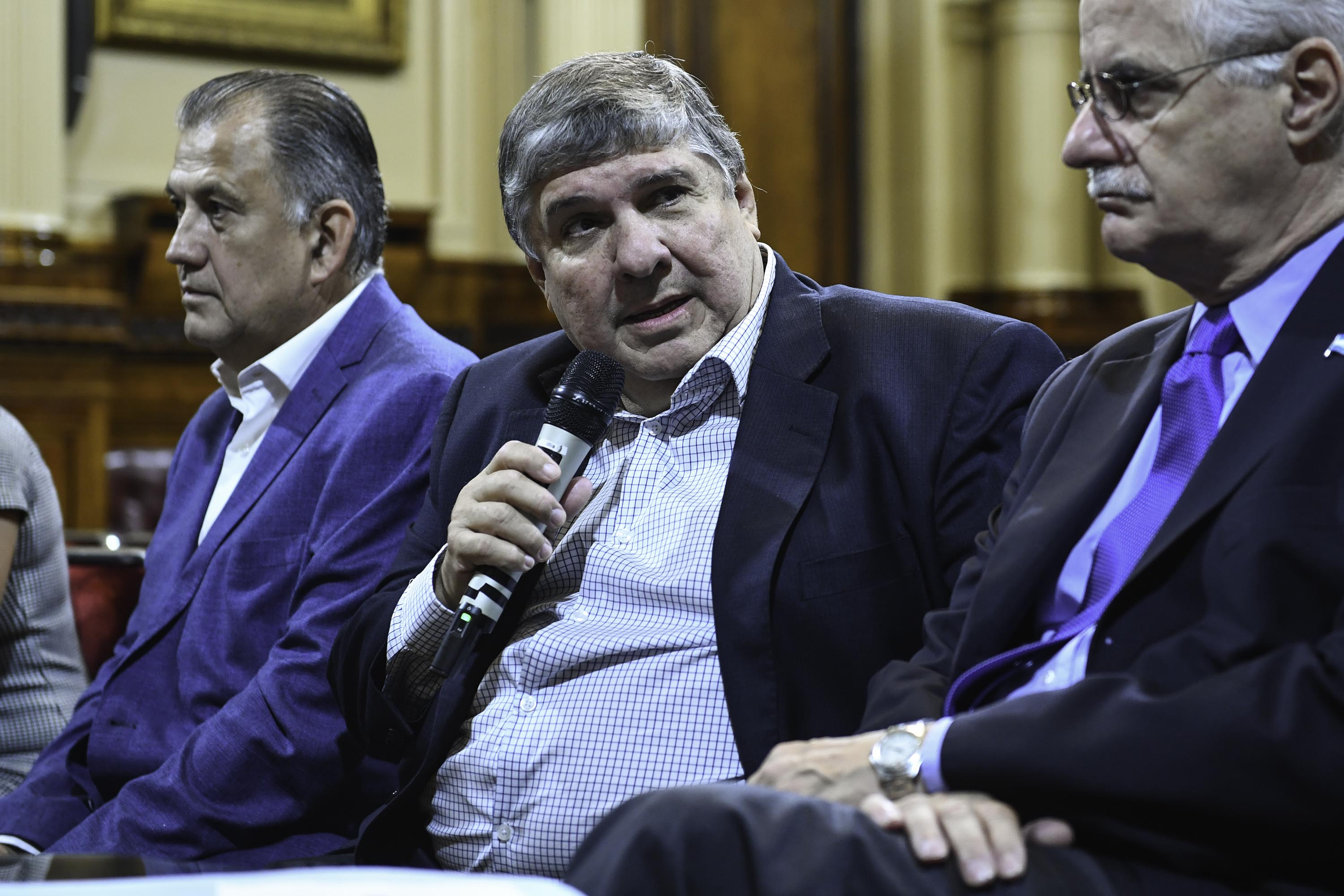
- Mayans in 2020

National Senator
- Incumbent
- Assumed office 10 December 2001
- Constituency: Formosa

Provincial Deputy of Formosa
- In office 10 December 1987 – 10 December 2001

Personal details
- Born: 19 March 1957 (age 69) Clorinda, Formosa, Argentina
- Party: Justicialist Party
- Other political affiliations: Front for Victory (2003–2017); Frente de Todos (2019–2023); Union for the Homeland (2023–present)

José Miguel Ángel Mayans (born 19 March 1957) is an Argentine Justicialist Party politician. He sits in the Argentine Senate representing Formosa Province in the parliamentary bloc of the Frente de Todos.

Mayans is considered a close ally of longtime Formosa governor Gildo Insfrán. Mayans has been described as a "fanatic anti-abortion lobbyist" despite being part of the progressive-leaning Peronist movement. His conservative views have, at times, put him at odds with Peronist presidents Cristina Fernández de Kirchner and Alberto Fernández.

== Political career ==
Mayans was elected to the Argentine Senate in 2001, and has been re-elected four times: in 2005, 2011, 2017, and 2023. After having served as vice-president of the Front for Victory bloc for 17 years, he was elected as president of the Frente de Todos bloc upon the coalition's establishment in 2019. Prior to being elected to the Senate, he was a member of the Chamber of Deputies of Formosa from 1987 to 2001.

Since 2024, he has been Vice President of the Justicialist Party.

== Personal life ==
Mayans is a devout Roman Catholic.

Mayans has faced recurring intestinal hemorrhage complications. In October 2022, Mayans initially fell ill with a serious intestinal bleed and was hospitalized in Formosa. He was then medically transferred by air to the Hospital Italiano in Buenos Aires for surgery and specialized care. After undergoing surgery, he remained hospitalized for about two months, eventually being discharged in early December 2022 and recovering at home.

== Electoral history ==
Electoral history of José Mayans
Election	Office	List	#	District	Votes			Result	Ref.
Election	Office	List	#	District	Total	%	P.	Result	Ref.
1989	Provincial Deputy	Victory Front		Formosa Province	58,635	71.76%	1st (Note: Presented on an electoral list. The data shown represents the share of the vote the entire party/alliance received in that constituency.)	Elected	
1991	Provincial Deputy	Victory Front		Formosa Province	73,637	45.06%	1st	Elected	
1995	Provincial Deputy	Justicialist Party		Formosa Province	104,010	58.82%	1st	Elected	
1999	Provincial Deputy	Justicialist Party		Formosa Province	144,469	72.28%	1st	Elected	
2001	National Senator	Unity Front	1	Formosa Province	81,190	43.11%	1st	Elected	
2005	National Senator	Front for Victory	1	Formosa Province	122,117	59.81%	1st	Elected	
2011	National Senator	Front for Victory	1	Formosa Province	179,985	78.39%	1st	Elected	
2017	National Senator	Front for Victory	1	Formosa Province	201,972	61.69%	1st	Elected	
2023	National Senator	Union for the Homeland	1	Formosa Province	184,475	54.18%	1st	Elected	

Party political offices
Preceded by Cristina Álvarez Rodríguez	Vice President of the Justicialist Party; 2024–present	Incumbent
