= Carlos Espínola (sailor) =

Argentine windsurfer and politician

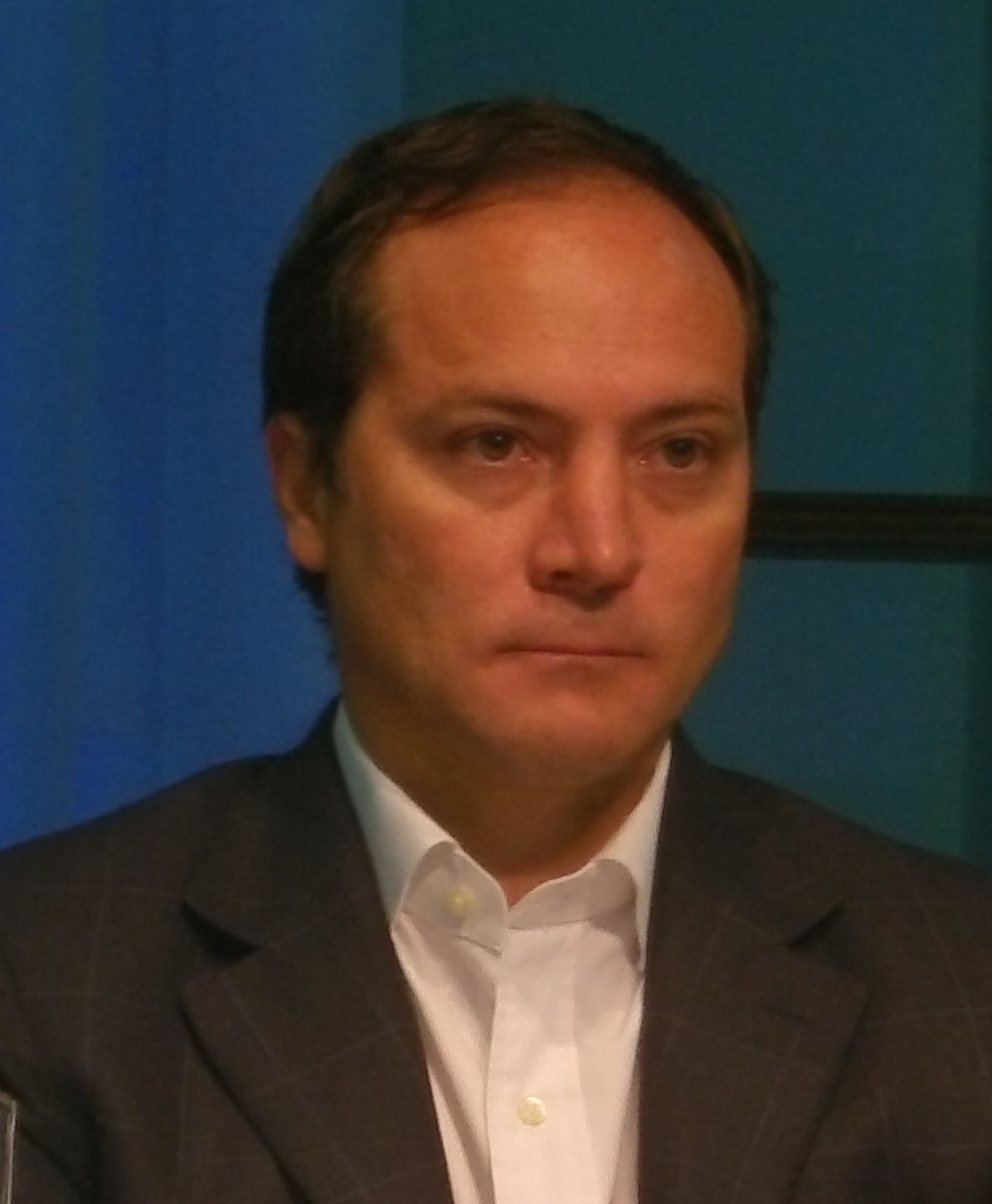

National Senator
- Incumbent
- Assumed office 10 December 2015
- Constituency: Corrientes

Secretary of Sports
- In office 6 February 2014 – 10 December 2015
- President: Cristina Fernández de Kirchner
- Preceded by: Claudio Morresi
- Succeeded by: Carlos Mac Allister

Mayor of Corrientes
- In office 10 December 2009 – 10 December 2013
- Preceded by: Carlos Vignolo
- Succeeded by: Fabián Ríos

Personal details
- Born: 5 October 1971 (age 54) Corrientes, Argentina
- Party: Justicialist Party
- Other political affiliations: Front for Victory (2009–2017); Frente de Todos (2019–present)
- Sports career
Medal record
Sailing
Representing Argentina
Olympic Games
Silver medal – second place	1996 Atlanta	Mistral (men)
Silver medal – second place	2000 Sydney	Mistral (men)
Bronze medal – third place	2004 Athens	Tornado (open)
Bronze medal – third place	2008 Beijing	Tornado (open)
Pan American Games
Gold medal – first place	1995 Mar del Plata	Mistral (men)
Silver medal – second place	1991 Havana	Mistral (men)

Carlos Mauricio "Camau" Espínola (born 5 October 1971) is an Argentine windsurfer and politician. He served as Mayor of Corrientes from 2009 to 2013 and is a National Senator since 2015.

== Sailing career ==
Espínola was born in Corrientes and started training at the Club Náutico de La Totora in his home province. He obtained his first important award, a silver medal, during the Pan American Games held in 1991 in Havana. In the following games, held in Mar del Plata in 1995, Espínola obtained the gold medal.

A year later he won the silver medal at the 1996 Olympics held in Atlanta; he would win a silver medal at the Olympic Games in Sydney. In 1998, he won the gold medal in the European windsurf Championship held in Greece.

Espínola then decided to change category, from Mistral (windsurf) to Tornado, with Santiago Lange he got a bronze medal at the 2004 Summer Olympics in Athens, and then again in the 2008 Summer Olympics in Beijing, becoming the Argentine sportsman with most Olympic medals (this record of four medals was equalled in 2012 by field hockey player Luciana Aymar). He is also the only sportsperson who had the honor of being the flag bearer for Argentina in two Summer Olympic Games (2000 in Sydney and 2004 in Athens).

In 1996, Carlos received the Gold Olimpia Award as the best athlete of the year from his country. He won the Platinum Konex Award two times, in 2000 and 2010, as the best sailor from the each decade in Argentina.

== Political career ==
In April 2009, Espínola announced he was a candidate for the office of Mayor of Corrientes, on the ticket of Fabián Ríos, Front for Victory candidate for Governor of Corrientes Province. He was elected as mayor of his native city on 13 September, and on 10 December he took office. He is a member of the Justicialist Party (Peronist) and of the Front for Victory (Kirchnerist), the Peronist faction and alliance led by President Cristina Fernández de Kirchner. Espínola was nominated as the Front for Victory candidate for governor ahead of the September 2013 elections in Corrientes. He was defeated by incumbent Governor Ricardo Colombi of the centrist UCR, however, by a 51-to-46% margin; Espínola was succeeded as mayor by fellow Front for Victory lawmaker Fabián Ríos.

In 2015, Espínola was elected Senator. In September 2024, along with Edgardo Kueider (now expelled), he crossed the floor, while remaining a Peronist in name. He has since voted with the far-right government bloc in most issues.

Awards
Preceded by (Argentina) Nora Vega	Olimpia de Oro; 1996	Succeeded by (Argentina) José Meolans
