= La Libertad Avanza =

Argentine conservative political coalition and party

Liberty Advances La Libertad Avanza
- Abbreviation: LLA
- Leader: Javier Milei
- President: Karina Milei (Note: President of the La Libertad Avanza party)
- Deputies leader: Gabriel Bornoroni
- Founders: Javier Milei; Victoria Villarruel
- Founded: 8 July 2021; 5 years ago (coalition); 7 April 2024; 2 years ago (transition to party); 28 September 2024; 2 years ago (party)
- Student wing: Universitarios por la Libertad (UPL)
- Youth wing: Juventud La Libertad Avanza
- Membership (2024): ▲64,078
- Ideology: Right-libertarianism; Libertarian conservatism; Ultraconservatism; Right-wing populism
- Political position: Right-wing to far-right
- Member parties: Integrated parties
- Colors: Violet
- Senate: 21 / 72
- Chamber of Deputies: 95 / 257
- Governors: 0 / 24
- Provincial Legislatures: 126 / 1,199
- Municipalities: 3 / 1,298
- Mercosur Parliament: 15 / 43

Website
- www.lalibertadavanza.org

La Libertad Avanza (LLA; lit. 'Liberty Advances' or 'Freedom Advances') is a political coalition and party in Argentina. LLA was formed as an electoral alliance in 2021, and as a nationwide party in 2024. It has been described as conservative, social conservative, and ultraconservative on social and cultural issues, and as right-wing libertarian or ultra-liberal on economic issues. Its first electoral participation was at the 2021 Argentine legislative election, obtaining the third place with 17% of the votes in the capital.

The coalition is led by the economist Javier Milei, who was elected President of Argentina as the coalition's candidate in the 2023 Argentine general election. After sealing an agreement with the politician Juan José Gómez Centurión, the candidates Victoria Villarruel and María Fernanda Araujo, among other conservative leaders, joined the alliance. Milei presented himself separately from the Buenos Aires candidate José Luis Espert, with whom he had previously been linked in the Avanza Libertad, and said there was no relations with the homonymous Córdoba front.

Ideologically, La Libertad Avanza has taken ultraconservative, paleolibertarian, minarchist, anarcho-capitalist, and anti-communist positions. It has been described as anti-establishment, anti-politics, and opposed to Kirchnerism.

Milei and Villarruel were the coalition's successful presidential and vice-presidential candidates for the 2023 general election. The coalition calls itself "a government alliance, which brings together, convenes, and addresses men and women of all social conditions, made up of different political parties, and created to promote liberal policies that contribute to the economic, political, cultural, and social take-off that we Argentines need to return to being the thriving country that we were at the beginning of the year 1900", in reference to the Generation of '80.

== History ==
=== Foundation ===
On 14 July 2021, La Libertad Avanza was formalized in Buenos Aires, where many of its member parties are from, to participate in the 2021 Argentine legislative election, having Javier Milei and Victoria Villarruel as the main candidates for national deputies, and Ramiro Marra as the first candidate for the Buenos Aires City Legislature. The coalition was formed by the Integration and Development Movement (MID), Unite for Freedom and Dignity, the and Movement of Pensioners and Youth. In addition, they had the support of parties without legal personality in the district, such as the NOS party of Juan José Gómez Centurión, or Milei's Libertarian Party.

=== Election campaign and primary elections ===
On 7 August 2021, the alliance launched its electoral campaign for the primary elections in Argentina with Milei headlining the event in Plaza Holanda, Palermo, Buenos Aires. Villarruel and Marra also took part at the event, where it was emphasized the critique the political caste and the national government of Alberto Fernández.

On 5 September 2021, the alliance closed its electoral campaign for the 2021 primary elections in Lezama Park, La Boca, Buenos Aires. The event was estimated to have been attended by at least 25,000 people and focused on criticism mainly in Frente de Todos and Juntos por el Cambio. Hours before the event, Eduardo Bolsonaro, son of the then president of Brazil; in a video call with Milei, he stated that he supported their coalition. In the 2021 primary elections, they obtained 242,839 votes for national deputies, 13.90% of the votes, and 238,797 votes, or 13.82% of the votes, for Buenos Aires legislators. They became the third force in the district after Juntos por el Cambio and the Frente de Todos.

=== General election ===
In the general election, the coalition obtained 313,808 votes for national deputies, 17.04% of the votes, and 318,978 votes for Buenos Aires legislators, 16.74% of the votes. With these results, they obtained two national deputies and five Porteño legislators. The coalition celebrated the results at the Luna Park Stadium, where one of the custodians threatened to draw his non-lethal weapon at the attempt of one of the spectators to get on stage.

According to the electoral campaign financing reports that were submitted after the deadline, the alliance did not obtain private financing and relied exclusively on funds provided by the state. For this reason, doubts arose about the financing of the campaign, which included events with LED screens and sound, as well as rentals such as Luna Park and the Grand View hotel. In that sense, Carlos Maslatón, one of the organizers of the campaign, excused himself by saying that the financing of political campaigns was 98% in black.

=== National bloc ===
On 23 April 2022, the coalition held a political event, headed by Milei in O'Higgins park, promoted by the Democratic Party of Mendoza, with which they signed a political agreement, as well as with the national Democratic Party. This agreement was put to a vote by the party's national convention on 28 May. On 16 May, it was confirmed that the Democratic Party of Córdoba would join the coalition structure, and that its referent, Rodolfo Eiben, had intentions of competing for the governorship of the province. On 24 May, the central board of the Democratic Party of Mendoza voted in favor of the agreement with the coalition, with 43 votes in favor, 16 against, and two abstentions. On 28 May, the national convention of the national Democratic Party, with 11 votes in favor and three against, voted in favor of the agreement with Milei and the coalition for the 2023 Argentine general election.

On 29 April 2022, an agreement was made with the Neighborhood Confederation of Entre Ríos through the Buenos Aires legislator Rebeca Fleitas, a native of that province. After various talks since November 2021, an agreement was sealed between the coalition and Alfredo Avelín, president of Cruzada Renovadora, in the province of San Juan during the month of May. In addition, negotiations with the party in the province of Jujuy were confirmed. In the same way, an agreement was signed with Fuerza Republicana of Ricardo Bussi in the province of Tucumán. A coalition political event in the province was also confirmed for 23 July. By the end of May, after four weeks of negotiations, the Integration and Development Movement reached an agreement with the coalition in the province of Córdoba, also joining the district assembly.

In July 2023, businessman Juan Carlos Blumberg alleged that leaders close to Milei, such as Carlos Kikuchi, former political advisor to Domingo Cavallo, charged up to $50,000 in exchange for political positions. Blumberg also said that within La Libertad Avanza there are people close to Sergio Massa and Kirchnerism. In response, Milei defended himself on social networks, arguing: "These days we have been harshly questioned about the financing of our campaign. In our space, each one of us self-finances the campaign, that is, we do it with our own money and effort. That bothers traditional politicians, because they finance themselves with taxes, that is, they steal what you pay them to campaign. In this space the one who comes to put stays, here each one banks with his own; anyone who wants to come here to see if he steals a load gets ejected." In addition to Blumberg, the journalist Carlos Eguia, who was the candidate for governor in the province of Neuquén for La Libertad Avanza, denounced an alleged "sale of the brand and places" on the lists. Faced with these accusations, Julio Serna, a leader close to Carlos Kikuchi, stated that "money was never asked, we only explained how to run a campaign." The justice system began an investigation against Milei. Ramiro González, the prosecutor with electoral jurisdiction, summoned the leaders Carlos Maslatón, Rebeca Maria Belen Fleitas, and Mila Zurbriggen to testify. Although Maslatón did not provide concrete evidence, he claimed to have obtained data on the sale of positions; Fleitas and Zurbriggen denied having specific data. Blumberg was also summoned to testify but did not appear. Milei accused González of "damaging his image" and demanded that the justice system investigate him instead. The claim is in charge of the attorney general Eduardo Casal. The case was closed in March 2024: the prosecutor could not find any evidence of wrongdoing to investigate any crime.

== Political positions ==
=== State reform ===
La Libertad Avanza advocates for a reduction in the size and scope of the Argentine state, arguing that its current scale and regulatory framework are detrimental to economic efficiency and individual prosperity. The party emphasizes that the primary role of the state should be to protect fundamental rights, including life, liberty, and property.

==== Government reform ====
La Libertad Avanza proposes a streamlined federal government structure, which would reduce the number of ministries to 8 from the 19 in the presidency of Alberto Fernández.

==== Specific reductions ====
The party outlines specific areas for reducing government bureaucracy and expenditures, including:

- Eliminating Chief of Staff positions in various ministries, secretariats, and directorates, arguing that these roles often serve as patronage positions.
- Dissolving policy analysis teams in each ministry that they claim function primarily to centralize control.
- Implementing mechanisms for effective expense control within each ministry.
- Reassigning public employees and terminating politically appointed posts, with an aim to eliminate what the party describes as state personnel privileges.
  - Specifics of the reassignment process:
    - The party acknowledges that the restructuring will result in a reduction of certain roles due to the closure or downsizing of government bodies.
    - Career state employees would be reassigned rather than terminated.
    - All political appointments made in the year 2023 would be subject to termination.
    - Certain perks, such as security details and chauffeurs, would be removed, except in cases where they are deemed necessary for security reasons.
- Recommending the closure or privatization of specific public companies and agencies, arguing that these entities often serve as platforms for politically motivated appointments.

=== Economic reforms ===
La Libertad Avanza attributes Argentina's economic challenges to a centralized and bureaucratic system. They argue that a market-oriented approach, grounded in principles of limited government and free trade, is more conducive to economic growth and prosperity.

==== Specific economic reforms ====
La Libertad Avanza proposes a series of specific reforms that include:

- Aiming to reduce public spending by 15% of GDP as an initial step.
- Lowering taxes with the goal of eliminating 90% of existing ones, citing their inefficiency and detrimental impact on the economy.
- Modernizing labor laws to encourage job creation, taking inspiration from models like that of UOCRA.
- Advancing towards a unilateral trade policy modeled after Chile, with the goal of enhancing international competitiveness for Argentine companies.
- Eliminating the Central Bank to end inflation, arguing that the institution enables irresponsible fiscal policy.
- Reforming the energy sector by recalibrating subsidies and tariffs, and inviting private sector participation.

=== Judicial reforms ===
La Libertad Avanza contends that the judiciary plays a critical role in democratic governance and economic development, but argues that it has been compromised by political influences. According to the party, the judiciary currently falls short of its role in checking political power and safeguarding individual rights. The party proposes a judicial reform aimed at depoliticizing the system and strengthening its role in defending citizens' rights.

==== Specific judicial reforms ====
The party proposes specific reforms to improve the judiciary's function and independence, including:

- Appointing a Minister of Justice from among respected members of the judiciary.
- Nominating a Supreme Court justice who is impartial and committed to upholding constitutional principles.
- Appointing an impartial Prosecutor General.
- Filling vacancies in federal courts with judges who have no political affiliations.
- Enhancing the financial independence of the judiciary.
- Revaluing judicial careers to attract and retain competent professionals.
- Implementing an adversarial accusatory system to improve judicial efficiency.
- Instituting trial by jury nationwide, as provided for in the constitution.
- Prohibiting members of the judiciary from having political affiliations.
- Reforming the Judiciary Council to minimize political influence.
- Eliminating entities within the Ministry of Justice that promote positive discrimination, arguing that they contribute to politicization.
- Streamlining judicial procedures through the use of oral proceedings.
- Transferring the jurisdiction of national justice to the Autonomous City of Buenos Aires.

=== Human capital ===
La Libertad Avanza proposes a comprehensive approach to addressing issues related to health, social development, labor, and education by consolidating them into a single Ministry of Human Capital. The party argues that those who rely on state assistance are not to blame for their circumstances, and it is the existing political system that is at fault. It advocates for maintaining social assistance until the country can transition to a more prosperous economic model based on freedom. La Libertad Avanza also champions the long-term transition to private systems for healthcare and education.

==== Childhood and family ====
The party identifies childhood poverty and lack of access to basic amenities as significant issues in Argentina, attributing these to long-standing policy failures.

==== Education ====
La Libertad Avanza aims for education reform based on principles of choice and competition. They argue that the current education system, largely centralized and bureaucratic, has failed to meet the needs of Argentine citizens.

==== Health ====
The party maintains that the current public health system is ineffective and calls for significant reforms.

=== Security reforms ===
La Libertad Avanza asserts that Argentina's declining security situation is primarily due to an "abolitionist" culture that views criminals as victims and the large size of the state, which has led to lack of control over its essential functions. The party emphasizes that the role of security forces and the state is to repress criminal activities to protect citizens' life, liberty, and property. In line with this, they propose a new security doctrine grounded in the principle of "you reap what you sow."

==== Specific security reforms ====
- Modifying the Interior Security Law.
- Revising the National Defense Law.
- Overhauling the Intelligence Law.
- Transforming the National Penitentiary System with public-private management.
- Prioritizing the fight against drug trafficking.
- Strengthening the Interior Security Council.
- Combating illegal land occupation.
- Ensuring free transit throughout the country.

=== Defence policy ===
The party views national defense as a fundamental responsibility of the federal government and advocates for an autonomous approach supported by the national private industry. It emphasizes the need to value the armed forces and their personnel, proposing a series of reforms to modernize and adequately finance the military.

==== Specific defence reforms ====
- Creating an agile, modern, and technologically advanced military force.
- Adequately funding the armed forces, to improve equipment and training.
- Restoring the prestige of the Armed Forces, both nationally and internationally.
- Reformulating the national intelligence system.

=== Foreign relations ===
La Libertad Avanza proposes a new doctrine in foreign relations, focused on two main principles: defending democracies globally, and promoting free trade between nations. The party declares that Argentina will no longer be an ally to dictatorships, and seeks to re-establish its position among democratic and free countries.

==== Specific foreign relations proposals ====
- Re-organizing the Argentine foreign ministry, to boost global trade.
- Aligning with democratic causes globally.
- Purging the foreign ministry of politically handpicked personnel, in favor of career staff.
- Discouraging the use of embassies for politicians' leisure.
- Reducing excessive spending and administrative units within the ministry.

=== Infrastructure ===
The party aims to revolutionize public works through two schemes designed to eliminate corruption and reduce public spending. The first involves adopting a private initiative model for public works, inspired by Chilean, Peruvian, and Swiss systems. The second focuses on the National Program for Urbanization Trusts, Neighborhood Infrastructure, and Cost-based Construction to address Argentina's housing deficit.

==== Specific infrastructure proposals ====
- Eliminating state-run public works in favor of privately run initiatives.
- Promoting a National Program to encourage urbanization trusts and neighborhood infrastructure.
- Facilitating the massive development of privately financed projects.
- Implementing the model through the Mortgage Bank for broader application.
- Offering formal workers mortgage credit based on 25% of their salary for 10 years.

== Presidents ==
| President | Portrait | District | Presidency start date | Presidency end date |
|---|---|---|---|---|
| Javier Milei (b. 1970) | | Buenos Aires | 10 December 2023 | Incumbent |

== Integrated parties ==
=== National ===
| Party | Leader | Ideology | Ref. |
|---|---|---|---|
| Democratic Party | Carlos Balter | National conservatism | |
| Libertarian Party | Nicolás Emma | Right-libertarianism | |
| Light Blue and White Union | Carlos Fabian Luayza | Federal Peronism | |
| Federal Renewal Party | José Videla Sáenz | Federal Peronism | |
| Faith Party | Cecilio Salazar | Federal Peronism | |

=== Provincial ===
| Party | Leader | Provinces | Ideology | Ref. |
|---|---|---|---|---|
| Democratic Party | Carlos Balter | Buenos Aires, Córdoba, Mendoza, San Luis, Chaco | Conservatism | |
| Integration and Development Movement (factions) | Juan Pablo Carrique | Buenos Aires, CABA, Córdoba | Developmentalism | |
| Unite for Freedom and Dignity | José Bonacci | Buenos Aires, CABA, Santa Fe | National conservatism | |
| Federal Renewal Party | José Videla Sáenz | Buenos Aires | Federal Peronism | |
| Pensioners and Youth Movement | German Foss | CABA | Republicanism | |
| Neighborhood Confederation of Entre Ríos | Alberto Olivetti | Entre Ríos | Vecinalism | |
| Republican Force | Ricardo Bussi | Tucumán | National conservatism | |

=== Former members ===
| Party | Leader | Ideology | Ref. |
|---|---|---|---|
| Conservative People's Party | Marco Michelli | Conservatism | |

== Electoral performance ==
=== Presidential elections ===
| Election year | Candidate | First round | | | Second round | | | Result |
| Election year | Candidate | Votes | % | Rank | Votes | % | Rank | Result |
|---|---|---|---|---|---|---|---|---|
| 2023 | Javier Milei | 8,034,990 | 29.99 | ▲2nd | 14,554,560 | 55.65 | ▲1st | Won |

=== Legislative elections ===
==== Chamber of Deputies ====
| Election year | Leader | Votes | % | Seats won | Total Seats | +/- | Position |
|---|---|---|---|---|---|---|---|
| 2021 | Javier Milei | 313,808 | 1.35 | 2 / 127 | 2 / 257 | New | Opposition |
| 2023 | Javier Milei | 6,843,049 | 27.88 | 35 / 130 | 37 / 257 | ▲35 | Government |
| 2025 | Gabriel Bornoroni | 9,341,798 | 40.66 | 64 / 127 | 93 / 257 | ▲43 | Government |

==== Senate ====
| Election year | Leader | Votes | % | Seats won | Position |
|---|---|---|---|---|---|
| 2023 | Javier Milei | 3,007,526 | 25.90 | 7 / 24 | Government |
| 2025 | Javier Milei | 2,193,752 | 42.03 | 13 / 24 | Government |
