= Argentine Senate =

Upper house of the Argentine National Congress

Coordinates: 34.6105°S 58.3910°W

Honorable Chamber of Senators of the Argentine Nation Honorable Cámara de Senadores de la Nación Argentina
- 2025–2027 period
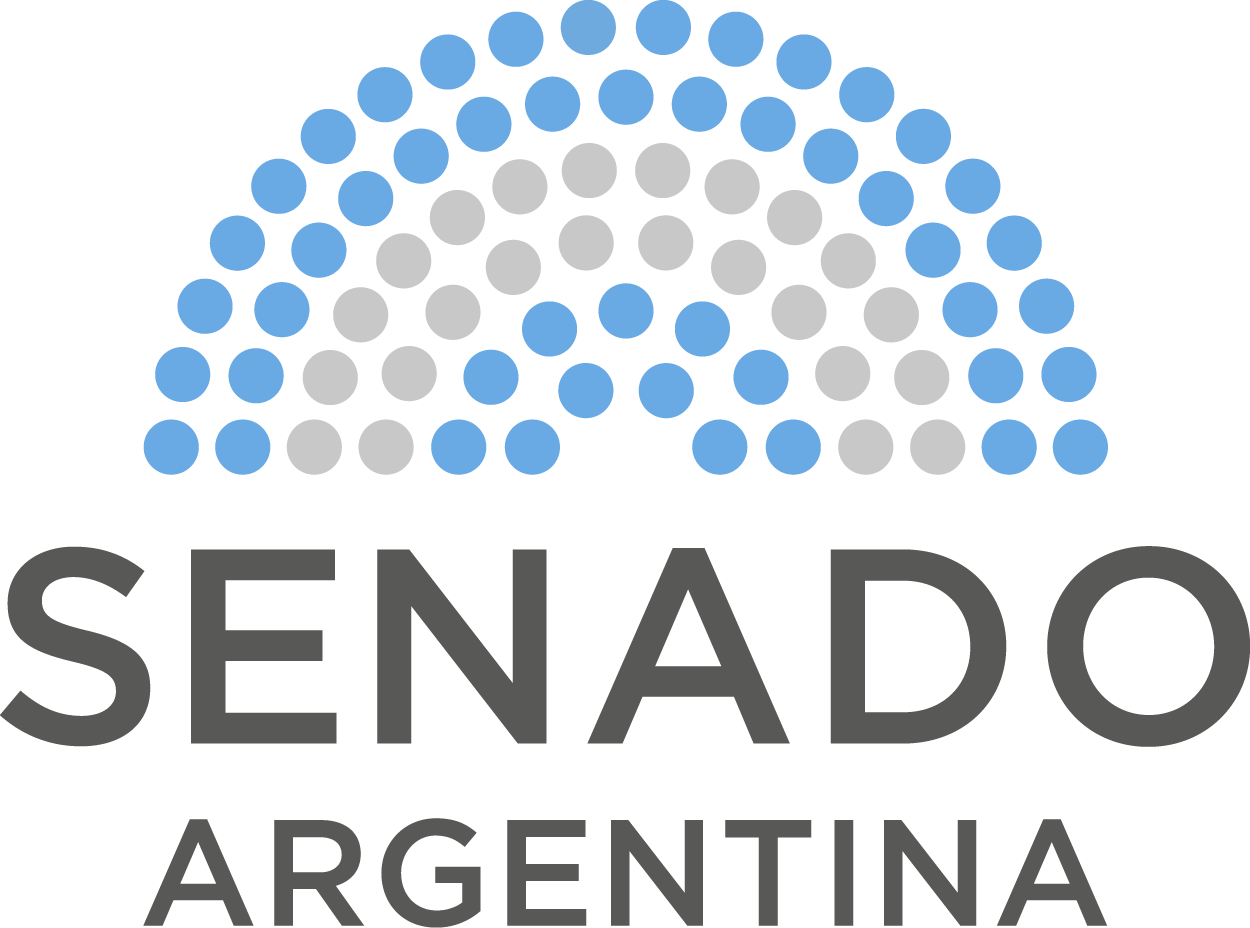

Type
- Type: Upper house of the National Congress of Argentina
- Term limits: None

Leadership
- President of the Senate: Victoria Villarruel, LLA since 10 December 2023
- Provisional President: Bartolomé Abdala, LLA since 13 December 2023
- First Minority Leader: José Mayans, UP since 10 December 2019
- Second Minority Leader: Eduardo Vischi, UCR since 10 December 2023

Structure
- Seats: 72 (List)
- Political groups: Government (21): LLA (21); Allies (5): PRO (4); Independencia (1); Independents (22): UCR (10); Federal Innovation (4); United Provinces (3); Federal Conviction (3); For Santa Cruz (2); Opposition (25): UP (25)
- Length of term: 6 years

Elections
- Voting system: Limited voting Party-list proportional representation
- Last election: 26 October 2025 (24 seats)
- Next election: 24 October 2027 (24 seats)

Meeting place
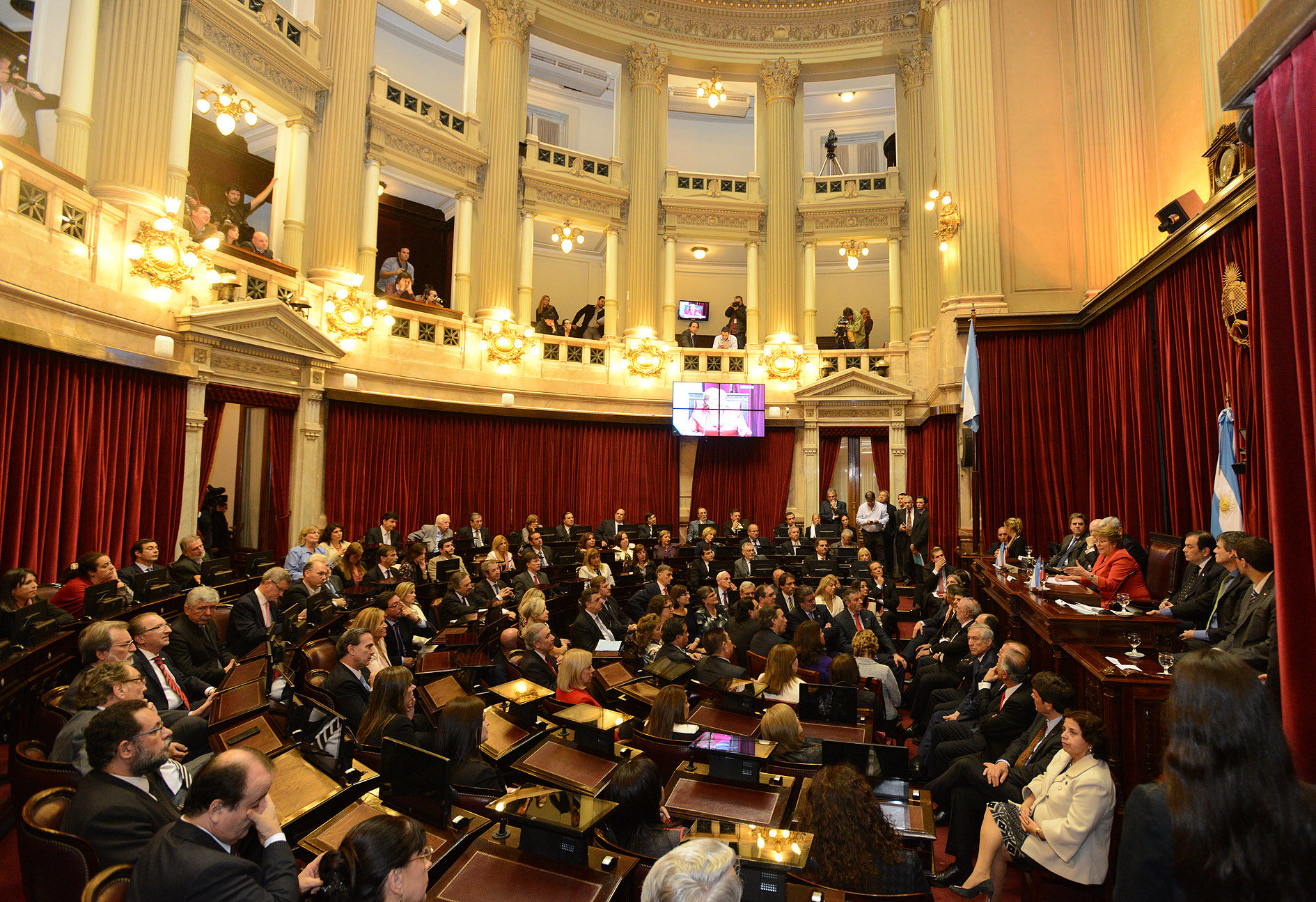
- Chamber of Senators, Congress Palace, Buenos Aires, Argentina

Website
- senado.gob.ar

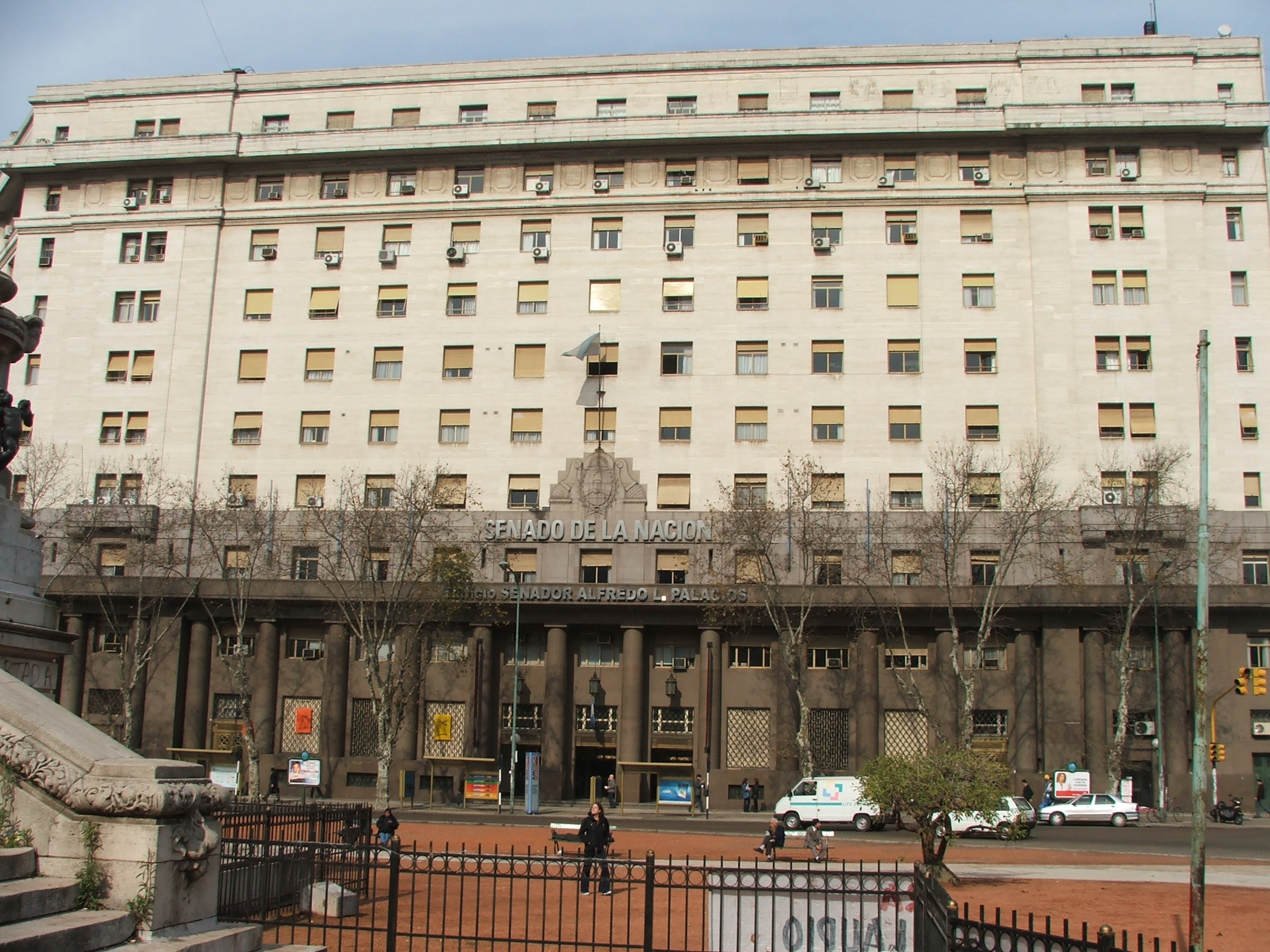
The Alfredo Palacios Senate Office Building

The Chamber of Senators of the Argentine Nation (Spanish: Cámara de Senadores de la Nación Argentina) or Senate, officially the Honorable Chamber of Senators of the Argentine Nation (Spanish: Honorable Cámara de Senadores de la Nación Argentina) is the upper house of the National Congress of Argentina.

== Overview ==
The National Senate was established by the Argentine Confederation on July 29, 1854, pursuant to Articles 46 to 54 of the 1853 Constitution. There are 72 members: three for each province and three for the Autonomous City of Buenos Aires. The number of senators per province was raised from two to three following the 1994 amendment of the Argentine Constitution as well as the addition of the Autonomous City of Buenos Aires' senators. Those changes took effect following the May 14, 1995, general elections.

Senators are elected to six-year terms by direct election on a provincial basis, with the party with the most votes being awarded two of the province's senate seats and the second-place party receiving the third seat. Historically, senators were indirectly elected to nine-year terms by each provincial legislature. These provisions were abolished in the 1994 constitutional amendment, and the first direct elections to the Senate took effect in 2001. Currently one-third of the members are elected every two years; there are no term limits.

The vice president of the republic is ex officio president of the Senate, with a casting vote in the event of a tie. In practice, the provisional president presides over the chamber most of the time.

The Senate must obtain quorum to deliberate, this being an absolute majority. It has the power to approve bills passed by the Chamber of Deputies, call for joint sessions with the lower house or special sessions with experts and interested parties, and submit bills for the president's signature; bills introduced in the Senate must, in turn, be approved by the Chamber of Deputies for their submission to the president. The Senate must introduce any changes to federal revenue sharing policies, ratify international treaties, approve changes to constitutional or federal criminal laws, as well as confirm or impeach presidential nominees to the cabinet, the judiciary, the armed forces, and the diplomatic corps, among other federal posts.

=== Committees ===
As of 2012 there were 24 standing committees made up of 15 members each, namely:

- Agreements (confirmation of federal nominees)
- Constitutional Affairs
- Foreign Affairs and Worship
- Justice and Criminal Affairs
- General Legislation
- Budget and Finance
- Administrative and Municipal Affairs
- National Defense
- Domestic Security and Drug Trafficking
- National Economy and Investment
- Industry and Trade
- Regional Economies, Micro, Small and Medium Enterprises
- Labor and Social Security
- Agriculture, Cattle Raising and Fishing
- Education, Culture, Science and Technology
- Rights and Guarantees
- Mining, Energy and Fuels
- Health and Sports
- Infrastructure, Housing and Transport
- Systems, Media and Freedom of Speech
- Environment and Human Development
- Population and Human Development
- Federal Revenue Sharing
- Tourism.

=== Requirements ===
According to Section 55 of the Argentine Constitution, candidates for the Argentine Senate must:

- be at least 30 years old
- have been a citizen of Argentina for six years
- be native to the province of her or his office, or have been a resident of that province for two years.

== Composition ==
Inter-bloc	Bloc	President
Popular (25) (President: José Mayans)	Justicialist (21)	José Mayans
Popular (25) (President: José Mayans)	Federal Social Justice (2)	Fernando Aldo Salino
Popular (25) (President: José Mayans)	Civic Front for Santiago (2)	Gerardo Zamora
La Libertad Avanza (21)		Patricia Bullrich
Radical Civic Union (10)		Eduardo Vischi
Country Momentum (7) (President: Carlos Mauricio Espínola)	PRO Front (3)	Martín Goerling Lara
Country Momentum (7) (President: Carlos Mauricio Espínola)	United Provinces (2)	Carlos Mauricio Espínola
Country Momentum (7) (President: Carlos Mauricio Espínola)	Arise Chubut (1)	Edith Terenzi
Country Momentum (7) (President: Carlos Mauricio Espínola)	Independence (1)	Beatriz Ávila
Federal Conviction (3)		Carolina Moisés
Front for the Renewal of Concord (2)		Carlos Omar Arce
For Santa Cruz (2)		José María Carambia
Salteños First (1)		Flavia Royón
La Neuquinidad (1)		Julieta Corroza
Source: senado.gob.ar (last update: 24 February 2026)

== Senate leadership ==
The titular president of the Senate is the vice president of Argentina. However, day-to-day leadership of the Senate is exercised by the provisional president.

Current leadership positions include:

Title	Officeholder	Caucus	Province
President of the Senate (Note: Ex officio as Vice President of Argentina.)	Victoria Villarruel	La Libertad Avanza	City of Buenos Aires
Provisional President	Bartolomé Abdala	La Libertad Avanza	San Luis
Vice President	Carolina Moisés	Federal Conviction	Jujuy
First Vice President	Carolina Losada	Radical Civic Union	Santa Fe
Second Vice President	Alejandra Vigo	United Provinces	Córdoba
Parliamentary Secretary	Agustín Giustinian	—N/a	
Administrative Secretary	María Laura Izzo	—N/a	
First Minority Leader	José Mayans	Union for the Homeland	Formosa
Second Minority Leader	Patricia Bullrich	La Libertad Avanza	City of Buenos Aires

== See also ==
- List of current Argentine senators
- Argentine Chamber of Deputies
- List of former Argentine senators
- List of legislatures by country
