= List of female provincial governors in Argentina =

As of December 2023, nine women have served as governor of an Argentine province. Only seven (out of 23) of the country's provinces have been governed by women.

Following the 2023 provincial elections, for the first time since the first woman was elected to a provincial governorship in 2007, no women are presently serving as head of a provincial executive in Argentina.

== List of female governors ==
Incumbent

| Picture | Name (Lifespan) | Province | Term start | Term end | Party | Notes | Departure | Ref |
|---|---|---|---|---|---|---|---|---|
| | María Alicia Lemme (1954–) | San Luis | 23 December 2001 | 9 December 2003 | Justicialist Party | First (and only to date) woman to serve as governor of San Luis. First woman to serve as Governor (nationwide). First elected as Vice Governor; took office upon the designation of Governor Adolfo Rodríguez Saá as President of Argentina. | Term ended (did not seek reelection) | |
| | Mercedes Mariana "Nina" Aragonés de Juárez (1929–2023) | Santiago del Estero | 12 December 2002 | 1 April 2004 | Justicialist Party | First woman to serve as governor of Santiago del Estero. First elected as Vice Governor; took office upon the resignation of Governor Carlos Díaz. Wife of former governor Carlos Arturo Juárez. | Removed from office through federal intervention | |
| | Fabiana Ríos (1964–) | Tierra del Fuego | 10 December 2007 | 10 December 2015 | ARI (until 2010); Patagonian Social Party (from 2010) | First woman to serve as governor of Tierra del Fuego. First woman elected in a general election. First woman to be reelected. | Term limited | |
| | Lucía Benigna Corpacci (1959–) | Catamarca | 9 December 2011 | 9 December 2019 | Justicialist Party (FPV) | First (and to date only) woman to serve as governor of Catamarca. | Term ended (did not seek reelection) | |
| | Claudia Alejandra Ledesma Abdala de Zamora (1974–) | Santiago del Estero | 10 December 2013 | 10 December 2017 | Civic Front for Santiago | Wife of former governor Gerardo Zamora. | Term ended (did not seek reelection) | |
| | Rosana Andrea Bertone (1972–) | Tierra del Fuego | 10 December 2015 | 10 December 2019 | Justicialist Party (FPV) | First woman to succeed another woman. First woman to lose a reelection bid. | Lost reelection | |
| | Alicia Margarita Antonia Kirchner (1946–) | Santa Cruz | 9 December 2015 | 10 December 2023 | Kolina (FDT) | First (and to date only) woman governor of Santa Cruz. | Term limited | |
| | María Eugenia Vidal (1973–) | Buenos Aires | 10 December 2015 | 10 December 2019 | Republican Proposal (Cambiemos) | First (and to date only) woman governor of Buenos Aires. | Lost reelection | |
| | Arabela Marisa Carreras (1970–) | Río Negro | 10 December 2019 | 10 December 2023 | Together We Are Río Negro | First (and to date only) woman governor of Río Negro. | Term ended (did not seek re-election) | |

== List of female vice governors ==
In all of the provinces, the governor is seconded by a vice governor (vicegobernador or vicegobernadora), while in the City of Buenos Aires, the Chief of Government is seconded by a Deputy Chief who fulfills the same role. The vice governor is first in line should the governor be incapacitated, removed from office or die, and they typically preside over the provincial legislature (or the upper chamber thereof, in case of bicameral legislatures).

Five provinces (Corrientes, Formosa, Salta, San Juan and Tucumán) are yet to count with an elected female governor or vice governor.

Incumbent

| Picture | Name (Lifespan) | Province | Term start | Term end | Party | Notes | Departure | Ref |
|---|---|---|---|---|---|---|---|---|
| | Elva Pilar Barreiro de Roulet (1932–) | Buenos Aires | 10 December 1983 | 10 December 1987 | Radical Civic Union | First woman to serve as vice governor of Buenos Aires. First woman to serve as vice governor (nationwide). | Term ended (did not seek reelection) | |
| | Mercedes Margarita Oviedo (1952–) | Misiones | 10 December 1999 | 9 December 2001 | Justicialist Party (FPV) | First woman to serve as vice governor of Misiones. | Resigned to take office as National Senator | |
| | María Alicia Lemme (1954–) | San Luis | 10 December 1999 | 23 December 2001 | Justicialist Party | First woman to serve as vice governor of San Luis. First woman vice governor to take office as governor. | Became governor | |
| | Mercedes Mariana "Nina" Aragonés de Juárez (1929–2023) | Santiago del Estero | 10 December 1999 | 12 December 2002 | Justicialist Party | First woman to serve as vice governor of Santiago del Estero. | Became governor | |
| | Cecilia Felgueras (1962–) | City of Buenos Aires | 7 August 2000 | 10 December 2003 | Radical Civic Union | First woman to serve as vice chief of government of the City of Buenos Aires. | Term ended (did not seek reelection) | |
| | María Eugenia Bielsa Caldera (1958–) | Santa Fe | 10 December 2003 | 10 December 2007 | Justicialist Party | First woman to serve as vice governor of Santa Fe. | Term ended (did not seek reelection) | |
| | Graciela María Giannettasio (1950–2022) | Buenos Aires | 10 December 2003 | 10 December 2007 | Justicialist Party | | Term ended (did not seek reelection) | |
| | Norma Haydée Durango (1952–) | La Pampa | 10 December 2003 | 10 December 2007 | Justicialist Party | First woman to serve as vice governor of La Pampa. | Term ended (did not seek reelection) | |
| | Blanca Renee Pereyra | San Luis | 10 December 2003 | 10 December 2007 | Justicialist Party | | Term ended (did not seek reelection) | |
| | Marta Gabriela Michetti Illia (1965–) | City of Buenos Aires | 10 December 2007 | 20 April 2009 | Republican Proposal | | Resigned to take office as National Deputy | |
| | Blanca Felisa Porcel de Riccobell (1943–) | Santiago del Estero | 10 December 2007 | 23 March 2009 | Civic Front for Santiago | Replaced Emilio Rached. | Term ended (did not seek reelection) | |
| | Sandra Daniela Giménez (1967–) | Misiones | 10 December 2007 | 10 December 2011 | Party of Social Concord | | Term ended (did not seek reelection) | |
| | Griselda Rosa de las Mercedes Tessio (1946–) | Santa Fe | 10 December 2007 | 10 December 2011 | Radical Civic Union (FPCyS) | First woman to succeed another woman as vice governor (nationwide). | Term ended (did not seek reelection; elected National Senator) | |
| | Lucía Benigna Corpacci (1959–) | Catamarca | 9 December 2007 | 9 December 2009 | Justicialist Party (FPV) | First woman to serve as vice governor of Catamarca. | Term ended (did not seek reelection; elected National Senator) | |
| | Ana María Pechen (1949–) | Neuquén | 10 December 2007 | 10 December 2015 | Neuquén People's Movement | First (and to date only) woman to serve as vice governor of Neuquén. First woman vice governor to be reelected. | Term limited | |
| | Mirtha María Teresita Luna (1964–) | La Rioja | 10 December 2007 | 10 December 2011 | Justicialist Party (FPV) | First woman to serve as vice governor of La Rioja. | Term ended (did not seek reelection; elected National Senator) | |
| | Marta Grimaux de Blanco | Catamarca | 10 December 2009 | 10 December 2011 | Radical Civic Union (FCySC) | Replaced Lucía Corpacci. | Term ended (did not seek reelection) | |
| | Alicia Mónica Pregno (1959–) | Córdoba | 10 December 2011 | 10 December 2015 | Justicialist Party (UPC) | First woman to serve as vice governor of Córdoba. | Term ended (did not seek reelection) | |
| | Norma Haydée Durango (1952–) | La Pampa | 10 December 2011 | 10 December 2015 | Justicialist Party | | Term ended (did not seek reelection; elected as National Senator) | |
| | María Eugenia Vidal (1973–) | City of Buenos Aires | 10 December 2011 | 10 December 2015 | Republican Proposal | | Term ended (did not seek reelection; elected as Governor of Buenos Aires) | |
| | Laura Gisela Montero (1959–) | Mendoza | 10 December 2011 | 10 December 2015 | Radical Civic Union | First woman to serve as vice governor of Mendoza. | Term ended (did not seek reelection) | |
| | María Laura Stratta (1976–) | Entre Ríos | 10 December 2019 | 10 December 2023 | Justicialist Party | First woman to serve as vice governor of Entre Ríos. | Term ended (lost re-election) | |
| | Alejandra Silvana Rodenas (1976–) | Santa Fe | 12 December 2019 | 10 December 2019 | Justicialist Party | | Term limited | |
| | Mónica Susana Urquiza (1965–) | Tierra del Fuego | 17 December 2019 | Incumbent | Fueguian People's Movement | First woman to serve as vice governor of Tierra del Fuego. | Serving | |
| | Analía Alexandra Rach Quiroga (1984–) | Chaco | 10 December 2019 | 10 December 2019 | Justicialist Party | First woman to serve as vice governor of Chaco. | Term ended (did not seek re-election) | |
| | María Florencia López (1980–) | La Rioja | 10 December 2019 | 10 December 2019 | Justicialist Party | | Term ended (did not seek re-election) | |
| | Verónica María Magario (1969–) | Buenos Aires | 10 December 2019 | Incumbent | Justicialist Party | | Serving | |
| | Silvana Lorena Schneider (1982–) | Chaco | 10 December 2023 | 10 December 2025 | Radical Civic Union | | | |
| | Myrian Beatriz Prunotto (1973–) | Córdoba | 10 December 2023 | Incumbent | Radical Civic Union (HPC) | | Serving | |
| | Alicia Griselda Aluani (1973–) | Entre Ríos | 10 December 2023 | Incumbent | Radical Civic Union | | Serving | |
| | Alicia Susana Mayoral (1973–) | La Pampa | 10 December 2023 | Incumbent | Justicialist Party | | Serving | |
| | Teresita Leonor Madera (1975–) | La Rioja | 10 December 2023 | Incumbent | Justicialist Party | | Serving | |
| | Hebe Casado (1976–) | Mendoza | 10 December 2023 | Incumbent | Radical Civic Union | | Serving | |
| | Gloria Argentina Ruiz (1972–) | Neuquén | 10 December 2023 | Incumbent | Independent | | Serving | |
| | Gisela Scaglia (1976–) | Santa Fe | 10 December 2023 | 10 December 2025 | Republican Proposal | | | |
| | Clara Muzzio (1981–) | City of Buenos Aires | 10 December 2023 | Incumbent | Republican Proposal | | Serving | |

== See also ==
- Women in Argentina
- List of current provincial governors in Argentina
- List of provincial legislatures in Argentina
