= 2017 in Argentina =

- Decades: 1990s; 2000s; 2010s; 2020s; 2030s
- See also: Other events of 2017; List of years in Argentina

The following lists events that happened in Argentina in 2017.

== Incumbents ==
- President: Mauricio Macri
- Vice President: Gabriela Michetti

=== Governors ===
- Governor of Buenos Aires Province: María Eugenia Vidal
- Governor of Catamarca Province: Lucía Corpacci
- Governor of Chaco Province: Domingo Peppo
- Governor of Chubut Province: Mario Das Neves (until 3 October); Mariano Arcioni (starting 3 October)
- Governor of Córdoba: Juan Schiaretti
- Governor of Corrientes Province: Ricardo Colombi (until 10 December); Gustavo Valdés (starting 10 December)
- Governor of Entre Ríos Province: Gustavo Bordet
- Governor of Formosa Province: Gildo Insfrán
- Governor of Jujuy Province: Gerardo Morales
- Governor of La Pampa Province: Carlos Verna
- Governor of La Rioja Province: Ricardo Quintela
- Governor of Mendoza Province: Alfredo Cornejo
- Governor of Misiones Province: Hugo Passalacqua
- Governor of Neuquén Province: Omar Gutiérrez
- Governor of Río Negro Province: Alberto Weretilneck
- Governor of Salta Province: Juan Manuel Urtubey
- Governor of San Juan Province: Sergio Uñac
- Governor of San Luis Province: Alberto Rodríguez Saá
- Governor of Santa Cruz Province: Alicia Kirchner
- Governor of Santa Fe Province: Miguel Lifschitz
- Governor of Santiago del Estero: Claudia Ledesma Abdala (until 10 December); Gerardo Zamora (starting 10 December)
- Governor of Tierra del Fuego: Rosana Bertone
- Governor of Tucumán: Juan Luis Manzur

=== Vice Governors ===
- Vice Governor of Buenos Aires Province: Daniel Salvador
- Vice Governor of Catamarca Province: Octavio Gutiérrez (until 10 December); Jorge Solá Jais (starting 10 December)
- Vice Governor of Chaco Province: Daniel Capitanich
- Vice Governor of Corrientes Province: Gustavo Canteros
- Vice Governor of Entre Rios Province: Adán Bahl
- Vice Governor of Formosa Province: Floro Bogado (until 12 December); vacant thereafter (starting 12 December)
- Vice Governor of Jujuy Province: Carlos Haquim
- Vice Governor of La Pampa Province: Mariano Fernández
- Vice Governor of La Rioja Province: Néstor Bosetti
- Vice Governor of Misiones Province: Oscar Herrera Ahuad
- Vice Governor of Nenquen Province: Rolando Figueroa
- Vice Governor of Rio Negro Province: Pedro Pesatti
- Vice Governor of Salta Province: Miguel Isa
- Vice Governor of San Juan Province: Marcelo Lima
- Vice Governor of San Luis Province: Carlos Ponce
- Vice Governor of Santa Cruz: Pablo González
- Vice Governor of Santa Fe Province: Carlos Fascendini
- Vice Governor of Santiago del Estero: José Emilio Neder (until 10 December); Carlos Silva Neder (starting 10 December)
- Vice Governor of Tierra del Fuego: Juan Carlos Arcando

== Predicted and scheduled events ==
=== October ===
- October 22: Argentine legislative election, 2017

=== Unknown month ===
- Martín Fierro Awards ceremony

== Events ==
=== January ===
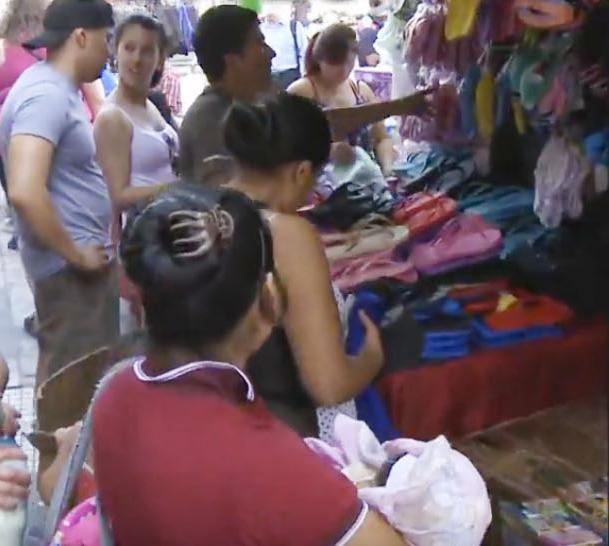
Manteros in the vicinity of the Once railway station.

- January 1: Celebrations of the New Year's Eve in Villa Gesell end in a police incident, with 15 people detained.
- January 2: The government buys four armed ships to Israel, to patrol the national borders.
- January 4
  - The government proposes to reduce the age of criminal responsibility from 16 to 14 years old.
  - The national chamber of criminal affairs reject a request to liberate Milagro Sala.
  - Governor María Eugenia Vidal vetoes a law in the Buenos Aires Province that would have allowed people from below and above the age of consent to attend nightclubs together at cities below 30,000 residents.
  - Minister Carolina Stanley undergoes medical treatment in the lungs.
- January 10: More than 2,000 manteros in the vicinity of the Once railway station are driven away by the police.
- January 11
  - Mauricio Macri announces an investment plan for Vaca Muerta.
  - Leonardo Meirelles, sentenced in the Operation Car Wash, reveals that he had transferred half a million dollars to Gustavo Arribas, head of the Federal Intelligence Agency of Argentina (AFI), in 2013.
  - Former governor Daniel Scioli meets Pope Francis.
- January 14: It became known that the President-elect of the United States Donald Trump praised the role of Argentina in South America.
- January 15: The government proposed to limit the arrival of immigrants with a criminal record.
- January 16: A flood strikes the Santa Fe Province.
- January 19
  - Javier González Fraga is appointed president of the Banco de la Nación Argentina.
  - Bicentennial of the Crossing of the Andes
- January 20: A leaked audio reveals an old phone conversation between then president Cristina Kirchner and the head of the SIDE Oscar Parrilli. In the audio they discuss dummy judicial cases started against the spy Antonio Stiuso.
- January 22: A report announces a recovery in the economy.
- January 27
  - The government halts a raise in wages in the banking system of 20%, which would be above the expected inflation rate.
  - Fire at the San Nicolas Cathedral, in Rosario
  - The government rejects a proposal to keep the Fútbol para todos program for six additional months.
- January 28: 250 foreign fishing ships are detected at the border of the Argentine Sea
- January 30: Jorge Olivera, at large since 2013, is recaptured.

=== February ===
- February 1: Judge Ariel Lijo open the case based on the investigations by the late Alberto Nisman.
- February 2: Retail shops start a new price system.

=== March ===
- March 1: Opening of regular sessions of the National Congress of Argentina.

=== October ===
- October 17 – the body of missing activist Santiago Maldonado is found in the Chubut River, two and a half months after his disappearance under suspicious circumstances after Maldonado was allegedly detained by the Gendarmerie during the repression of an indigenous protest Chubut.

=== December ===
- December 8 – Police officer Luis Chocobar kills an 18-year-old man and injures an underage accomplice who were fleeing from a robbery and attempted murder scene in La Boca. Chocobar's case garnered national attention and debate over the right of police officers to exercise lethal force.
- December 29 – Nahir Galarza case: 19-year-old Nahir Galarza murders her 20-year-old boyfriend Fernando Pastorizzo in Gualeguaychú, Entre Ríos.

== Deaths ==
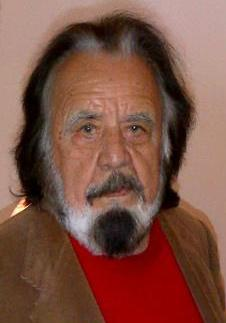
Folk singer Horacio Guarany.

- January 9: Politician José María Díaz Bancalari
- January 13: Folk singer Horacio Guarany.
- January 23: Television presenter Julieta Magaña
- April 11: Politician Alberto Balestrini

== See also ==
- List of Argentine films of 2017
