= 2018 in Argentina =

- Decades: 1990s; 2000s; 2010s; 2020s; 2030s
- See also: Other events of 2018; List of years in Argentina

The following lists events that happened in Argentina in 2018.

== Incumbents ==
- President: Mauricio Macri
- Vice President: Gabriela Michetti

=== Governors ===
- Governor of Buenos Aires Province: María Eugenia Vidal
- Governor of Catamarca Province: Lucía Corpacci
- Governor of Chaco Province: Domingo Peppo
- Governor of Chubut Province: Mariano Arcioni
- Governor of Córdoba: Juan Schiaretti
- Governor of Corrientes Province: Gustavo Valdés
- Governor of Entre Ríos Province: Gustavo Bordet
- Governor of Formosa Province: Gildo Insfrán
- Governor of Jujuy Province: Gerardo Morales
- Governor of La Pampa Province: Carlos Verna
- Governor of La Rioja Province: Ricardo Quintela
- Governor of Mendoza Province: Alfredo Cornejo
- Governor of Misiones Province: Hugo Passalacqua
- Governor of Neuquén Province: Omar Gutiérrez
- Governor of Río Negro Province: Alberto Weretilneck
- Governor of Salta Province: Juan Manuel Urtubey
- Governor of San Juan Province: Sergio Uñac
- Governor of San Luis Province: Alberto Rodríguez Saá
- Governor of Santa Cruz Province: Alicia Kirchner
- Governor of Santa Fe Province: Miguel Lifschitz
- Governor of Santiago del Estero: Gerardo Zamora
- Governor of Tierra del Fuego: Rosana Bertone
- Governor of Tucumán: Juan Luis Manzur

=== Vice Governors ===
- Vice Governor of Buenos Aires Province: Daniel Salvador
- Vice Governor of Catamarca Province: Jorge Solá Jais
- Vice Governor of Chaco Province: Daniel Capitanich
- Vice Governor of Corrientes Province: Gustavo Canteros
- Vice Governor of Entre Rios Province: Adán Bahl
- Vice Governor of Formosa Province: vacant
- Vice Governor of Jujuy Province: Carlos Haquim
- Vice Governor of La Pampa Province: Mariano Fernández
- Vice Governor of La Rioja Province: Néstor Bosetti
- Vice Governor of Misiones Province: Oscar Herrera Ahuad
- Vice Governor of Nenquen Province: Rolando Figueroa
- Vice Governor of Rio Negro Province: Pedro Pesatti
- Vice Governor of Salta Province: Miguel Isa
- Vice Governor of San Juan Province: Marcelo Lima
- Vice Governor of San Luis Province: Carlos Ponce
- Vice Governor of Santa Cruz: Pablo González
- Vice Governor of Santa Fe Province: Carlos Fascendini
- Vice Governor of Santiago del Estero: Carlos Silva Neder
- Vice Governor of Tierra del Fuego: Mónica Urquiza

== Predicted and scheduled events ==
=== May ===
- End of the 2017–18 Argentine Primera División tournament.

=== November ===
- November 30: 2018 G20 Buenos Aires summit

=== Unknown month ===
- Martín Fierro Awards ceremony.
- Superclásico
- Abortion debate over an abortion law bill.

== Events ==
=== January ===
- January 3: The tariffs of metropolitan buses, trains and subways in Buenos Aires are increased.
- January 4: Union leader Marcelo Balcedo, accused of money laundering, is detained in Uruguay, in a joint operation between the Interpol and the Uruguayan police.
- January 6: The economic emergency law ceases to be in force.
- January 9: Unable to get support from the PJ and the CGT for an amendment in the labor law, Macri postpones the bill for March.
- January 19: Raúl Zaffaroni, judge of the Inter-American Court of Human Rights, urges President Macri to resign.

=== February ===
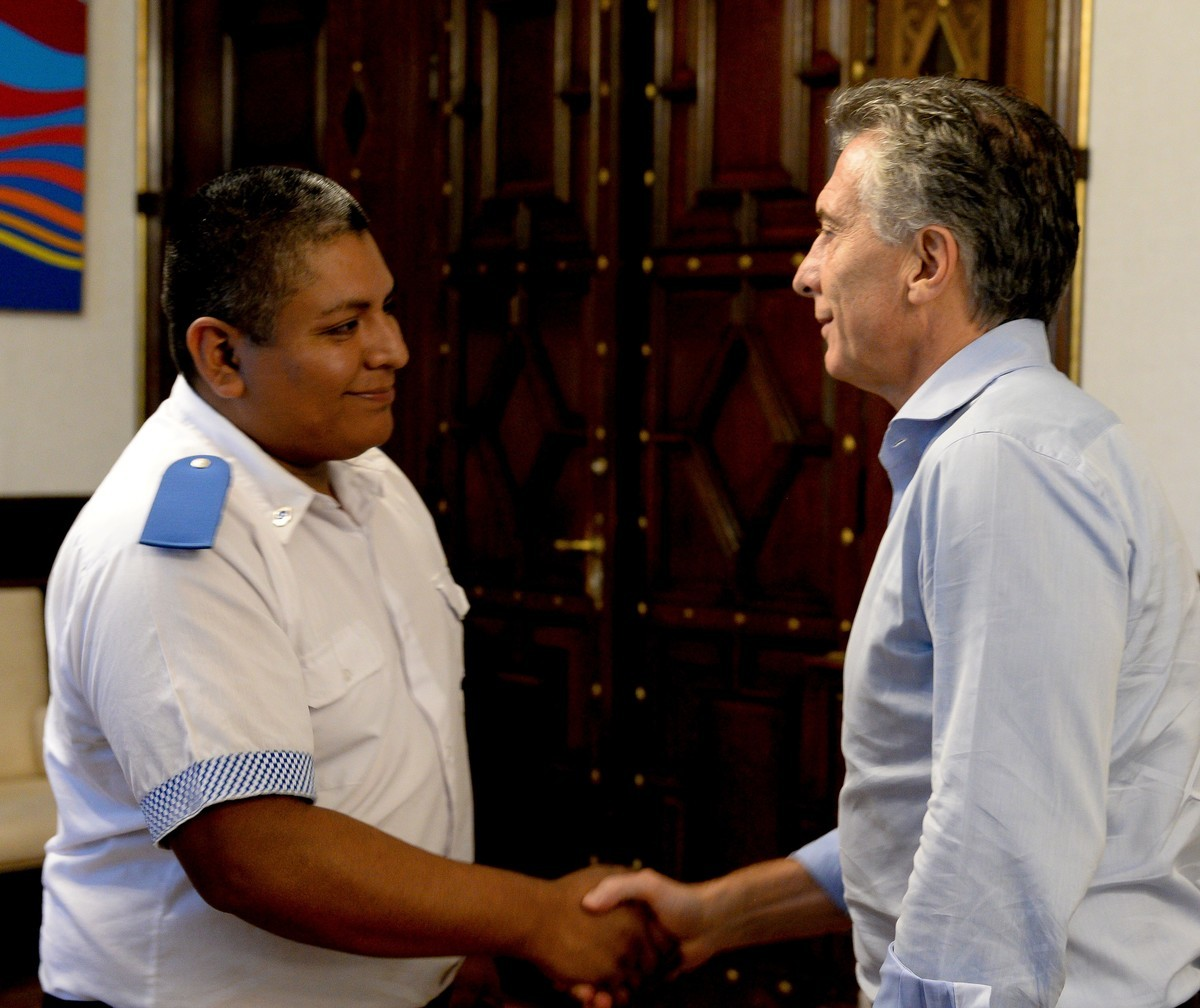
President Mauricio Macri receives the police officer Luis Chocobar at the Casa Rosada.

- February 1
  - Police officer Luis Chocobar is indicted by the judiciary, accused of murder, for shooting a thief who attempted to kill a tourist. President Macri receives him at the Casa Rosada, giving him his full support.
  - Members of the Argentine Congress propose a bill to ask for the removal of judge Raúl Zaffaroni from the Inter-American Court of Human Rights.
- February 2: The government closes the National Lottery, and ends the "Prode" game.
- February 7: Minister Patricia Bullrich meets with US specialists in security and terrorism, to discuss the G20 summit. Those people voiced concerns about a presence of Hezbollah in the Triple Frontier.
- February 8
  - Members of the Peronist parties Justicialist Party, Renewal Front and Citizen's Unity hold a summit, discussing a joint ticket for the 2019 general elections. The Peronist provincial governors did not attend it, with the exception of Alberto Rodríguez Saá.
  - Estela de Carlotto has a private meeting with Pope Francis.
- February 9: General strike of national banks.
- February 19: Two-days general strike of national banks.
- February 21: A general strike is called by union leader Hugo Moyano.
- February 22: Six suspected drug traffickers are jailed at the Russian embassy while trying to smuggle drugs in a diplomatic flight.
- February 27: Bolivia rejects a treaty of mutual free healthcare with Argentina.
- February 28
  - Bolivia reverses their previous decision, and announces a mutual free healthcare treaty with Argentina.
  - Union leaders Hugo and Pablo Moyano are indicted on money laundering charges.

=== March ===
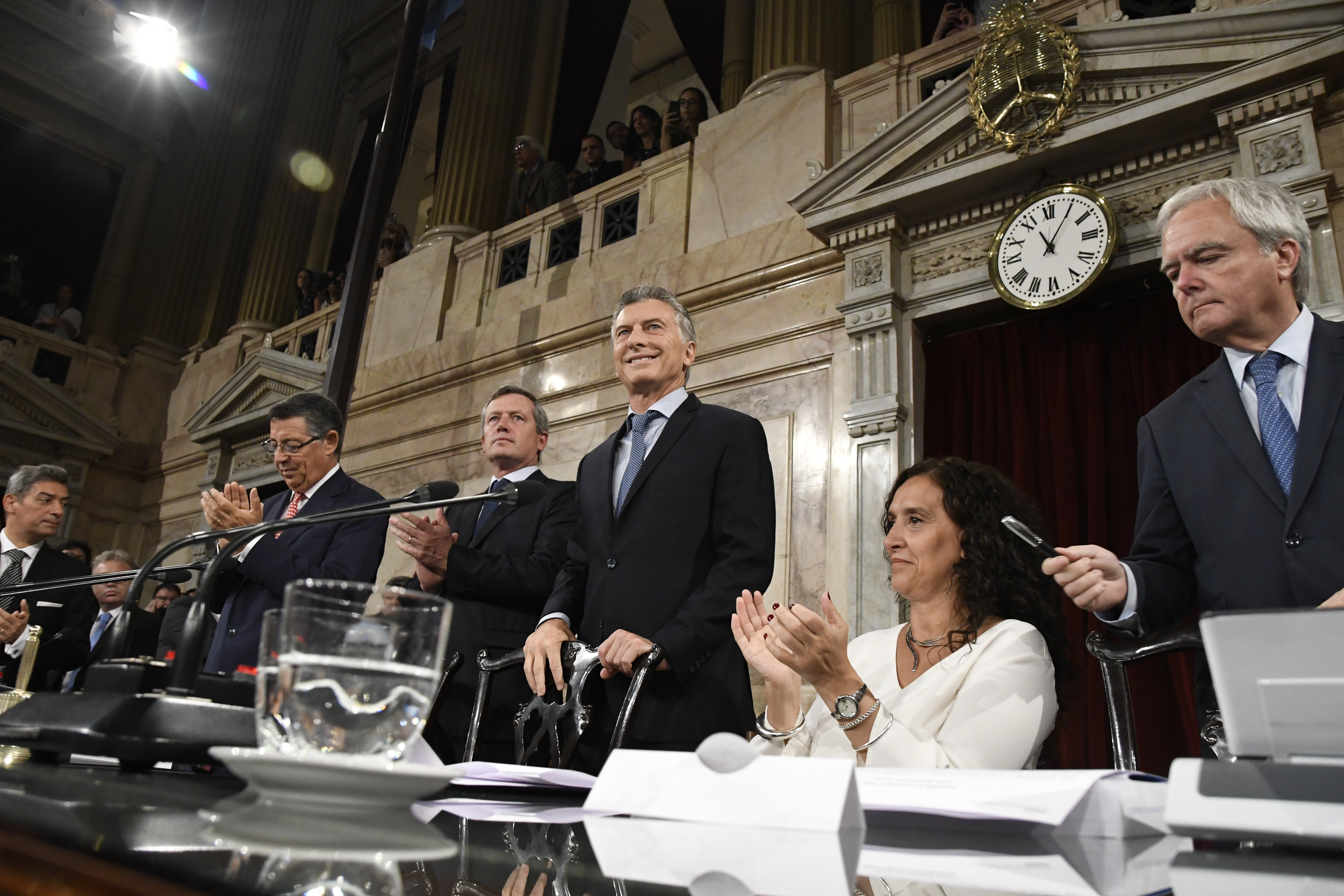
Opening of regular sessions of the National Congress of Argentina.

- March 1: Opening of regular sessions of the National Congress of Argentina.
- March 3: The Polish League Against Defamation filed a complaint against the newspaper Página/12, accusing them to violate the recently amended Act on the Institute of National Remembrance, which forbids any suggestion of Polish involvement in the Holocaust.
- March 5:
  - Facundo Jones Huala, leader of the Resistencia Ancestral Mapuche guerrilla, is extradited to Chile.
  - Former president Cristina Fernández de Kirchner is indicted for allegedly obstructing investigation into the 1994 AMIA Bombing which killed 85 people, allegedly making a deal with the Iranian government to stop investigating Iranian officials involved in the attack in exchange for better prices on Iranian oil.
- March 8: Large demonstrations during the International Women's Day.
- March 12: The ice bridge of the Perito Moreno Glacier collapses.
- March 13:
  - Julio Galván, member of the UOCRA union, is attacked by criminals. He denounced that the attack was carried out by rivals from the union.
  - Politicians from all political parties prepare a joint message for Pope Francis, at the 5º anniversary of his appointment.

=== May ===
- May 2: Former Callejeros vocalist Patricio Fontanet is granted parole after serving six and a half years of his seven-year prison term for the 2004 Cromañón nightclub fire where he was singing with the band.

== Deaths ==
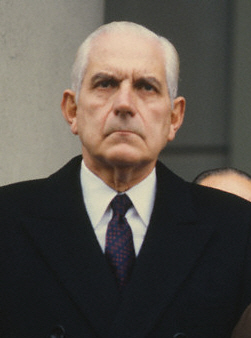
Reynaldo Bignone, de facto president, died March 7

- January 5: Antonio Valentín Angelillo (soccer player)
- January 11: Noemi Lapzeson (dancer)
- January 16: Rubén Oswaldo Díaz (soccer player)
- February 6
  - Débora Pérez Volpin (journalist)
  - Liliana Bodoc (writer)
- February 16: Osvaldo Suárez (sportsman)
- February 27
  - Luciano Benjamín Menéndez (general)
  - Hugo Santiago (director)
  - Héctor Roquel (deputy)
- March 7: Reynaldo Bignone (de facto president)
- March 13: Gastón Tavagnutti (dancer)
- March 14:
  - Emilio Disi (actor)
  - Rubén Galván, footballer (b. 1952)
- March 22: René Houseman (soccer player)
- July 10: Alicia Bellán (film, theatre actress)
- September 7: Julio Blanck (journalist)
- October 2: Hermenegildo Sábat (comic book artist)

== See also ==
- List of Argentine films of 2018
