= List of provincial governors in Argentina =

Argentina is subdivided into twenty-three provinces, each of it counting with its own governor. The country is organized under a federal system, so each province has its own constitution, and the powers and regulations of each governor vary.

Buenos Aires is not a province, nor is it part of Buenos Aires Province. The 1994 amendment of the Constitution of Argentina made it an autonomous city, with its own constitution, ruled by an elected mayor (Buenos Aires City Chief of Government).

A governor may be removed by the national government in the case of great turmoil, or if the legitimate governor had been illegally removed, for example, by a coup d'état. The President of Argentina would ask in this case for the Federal intervention of the province, which must be approved by the National Congress of Argentina.

Party affiliation of each Argentine governor

== Gallery ==
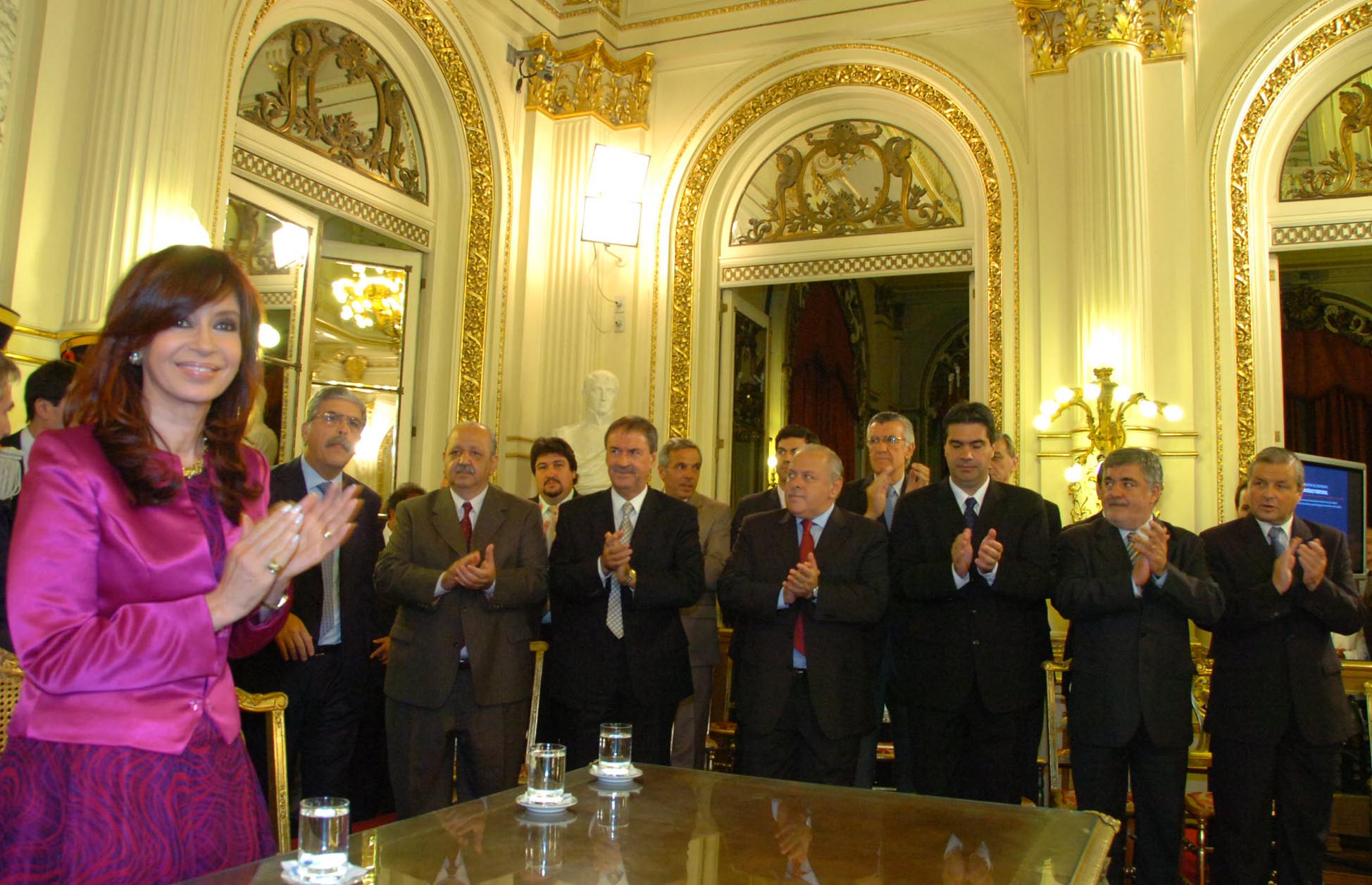
Meeting of president Cristina Fernández de Kirchner with provincial governors in 2008.

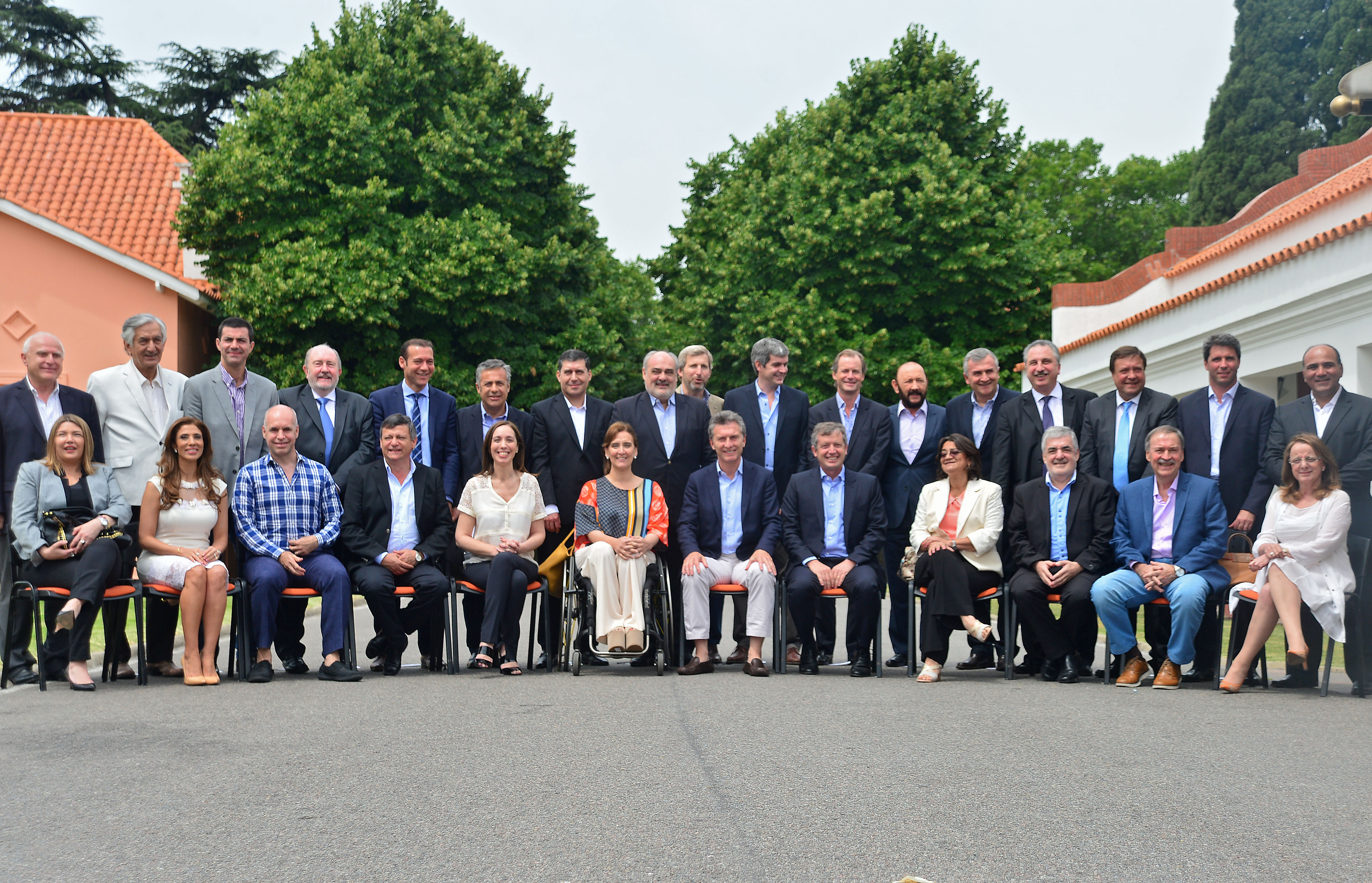
Meeting of president Mauricio Macri with all the provincial governors in 2015.

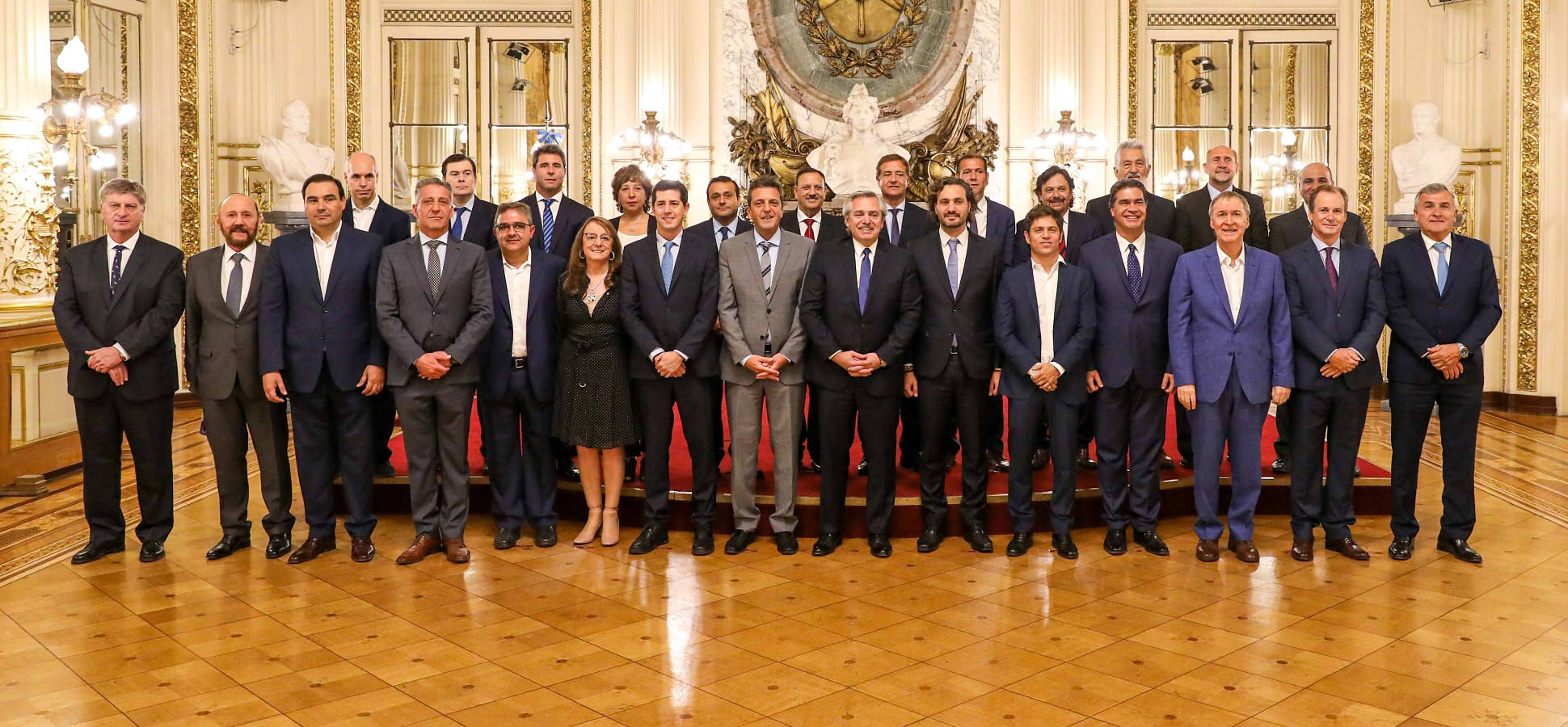
Meeting of president Alberto Fernández with all the provincial governors in 2019.

== List of current provincial heads of government ==
Province	Image	Name	Party (Coalition)	Took office	Term ends	Vice Governor	Historical list
Governors of Provinces
Buenos Aires		Axel Kicillof	PJ (UP)	11 December 2019	11 December 2027 (term limited)	Verónica Magario	List
Catamarca		Raúl Jalil	PJ (UP)	10 December 2019	10 December 2027	Rubén Dusso	List
Chaco		Leandro Zdero	UCR (JxC)	10 December 2023	10 December 2027	Silvana Schneider	List
Chubut		Ignacio Torres	PRO (JxC)	10 December 2023	10 December 2027	Gustavo Menna	List
Córdoba		Martín Llaryora	PJ (HPC)	10 December 2023	10 December 2027	Myrian Prunotto	List
Corrientes		Juan Pablo Valdés	UCR (JxC)	10 December 2025	10 December 2029	Pedro Braillard Poccard	List
Entre Ríos		Rogelio Frigerio	PRO (JxC)	10 December 2023	10 December 2027	Alicia Aluani	List
Formosa		Gildo Insfrán	PJ (UP)	10 December 1995	10 December 2027	Eber Solís (since 10 December 2019)	List
Jujuy		Carlos Sadir	UCR (JxC)	10 December 2023	10 December 2027	Alberto Bernis	List
La Pampa		Sergio Ziliotto	PJ (UP)	10 December 2019	10 December 2027 (term limited)	Alicia Mayoral (since 10 December 2023)	List
La Rioja		Ricardo Quintela	PJ (UP)	10 December 2019	10 December 2027 (term limited)	Teresita Madera (since 10 December 2023)	List
Mendoza		Alfredo Cornejo	UCR (JxC)	10 December 2023	10 December 2027 (term limited)	Hebe Casado	List
Misiones		Hugo Passalacqua	PCS	10 December 2023	10 December 2027	Lucas Romero Spinelli	List
Neuquén		Rolando Figueroa	Comunidad	10 December 2023	10 December 2027	Gloria Ruiz	List
Río Negro		Alberto Weretilneck	JSRN (UP)	10 December 2023	10 December 2027	Pedro Oscar Pesatti	List
Salta		Gustavo Sáenz	PAIS	10 December 2019	10 December 2027 (term limited)	Antonio Marocco	List
San Juan		Marcelo Orrego	Production and Labour (JxC)	10 December 2023	10 December 2027	Fabián Martín	List
San Luis		Claudio Poggi	Avanzar San Luis (JxC)	10 December 2023	10 December 2027	Ricardo Endeiza	List
Santa Cruz		Claudio Vidal	SER Santa Cruz	10 December 2023	10 December 2027	Fabián Leguizamón	List
Santa Fe		Maximiliano Pullaro	UCR (JxC)	10 December 2023	10 December 2027	Gisela Scaglia	List
Santiago del Estero		Elías Suárez	FCxS	10 December 2025	10 December 2029	Carlos Silva Neder	List
Tierra del Fuego		Gustavo Melella	FORJA (UP)	17 December 2019	17 December 2027 (term limited)	Mónica Urquiza	List
Tucumán		Osvaldo Jaldo	PJ (UP)	29 October 2023	29 October 2027	Miguel Ángel Acevedo	List
Chief of Government of Buenos Aires
Autonomous City of Buenos Aires		Jorge Macri	PRO (JxC)	10 December 2023	10 December 2027	Clara Muzzio	List

== See also ==
- List of female provincial governors in Argentina
- List of provincial legislatures in Argentina
