= 2019 in Argentina =

- Decades: 1990s; 2000s; 2010s; 2020s; 2030s
- See also: Other events of 2019; List of years in Argentina

The following lists events that happened or will happen in Argentina in 2019.

== Incumbents ==
- President: Mauricio Macri (until December 10) – Alberto Fernández (starting December 10)
- Vice President: Gabriela Michetti (until December 10) – Cristina Fernández de Kirchner (starting December 10)

=== Governors ===
- Governor of Buenos Aires Province: María Eugenia Vidal (until 11 December); Axel Kicillof (from 11 December)
- Governor of Catamarca Province: Lucía Corpacci (until 11 December); Raúl Jalil (starting 10 December)
- Governor of Chaco Province: Domingo Peppo (until 11 December); Jorge Capitanich (starting 10 December)
- Governor of Chubut Province: Mariano Arcioni
- Governor of Córdoba: Juan Schiaretti
- Governor of Corrientes Province: Gustavo Valdés
- Governor of Entre Ríos Province: Gustavo Bordet
- Governor of Formosa Province: Gildo Insfrán
- Governor of Jujuy Province: Gerardo Morales
- Governor of La Pampa Province: Carlos Verna (until 10 December); Sergio Ziliotto (starting 11 December)
- Governor of La Rioja Province: Ricardo Quintela
- Governor of Mendoza Province: Alfredo Cornejo (until 10 December); Rodolfo Suárez (starting 10 December)
- Governor of Misiones Province: Hugo Passalacqua (until 10 December); Oscar Herrera Ahuad (starting 10 December)
- Governor of Neuquén Province: Omar Gutiérrez
- Governor of Río Negro Province: Alberto Weretilneck (until 10 December); Arabela Carreras (starting 10 December)
- Governor of Salta Province: Juan Manuel Urtubey (until 10 December); Gustavo Sáenz (starting 10 December)
- Governor of San Juan Province: Sergio Uñac
- Governor of San Luis Province: Alberto Rodríguez Saá
- Governor of Santa Cruz Province: Alicia Kirchner
- Governor of Santa Fe Province: Miguel Lifschitz (until 10 December); Omar Perotti (starting 11 December)
- Governor of Santiago del Estero: Gerardo Zamora
- Governor of Tierra del Fuego:
  - until 10 December: Rosana Bertone
  - 10 December-17 December: Juan Carlos Arcando
  - starting 10 December: Gustavo Melella
- Governor of Tucumán: Juan Luis Manzur

=== Vice Governors ===
- Vice Governor of Buenos Aires Province: Daniel Salvador (until 10 December); Verónica Magario (starting 10 December)
- Vice Governor of Catamarca Province: Jorge Solá Jais (until 10 December); Rubén Dusso (starting 10 December)
- Vice Governor of Chaco Province: Daniel Capitanich (until 10 December); Analía Rach Quiroga (starting 10 December)
- Vice Governor of Corrientes Province: Gustavo Canteros
- Vice Governor of Entre Rios Province: Adán Bahl (until 10 December); María Laura Stratta (starting 10 December)
- Vice Governor of Formosa Province: vacant (until 10 December); Eber Wilson Solís (starting 10 December)
- Vice Governor of Jujuy Province: Carlos Haquim
- Vice Governor of La Pampa Province: Mariano Fernández
- Vice Governor of La Rioja Province: Néstor Bosetti (until 10 December); Florencia López (starting 10 December)
- Vice Governor of Misiones Province: Oscar Herrera Ahuad (until 10 December); Carlos Omar Arce (starting 10 December)
- Vice Governor of Nenquen Province: Rolando Figueroa (until 10 December); Marcos Koopmann (starting 10 December)
- Vice Governor of Rio Negro Province: Pedro Pesatti (until 10 December); Alejandro Palmieri (starting 10 December)
- Vice Governor of Salta Province: Miguel Isa (until 10 December); Antonio Marocco (starting 10 December)
- Vice Governor of San Juan Province: Marcelo Lima (until 10 December); Roberto Gattoni (starting 10 December)
- Vice Governor of San Luis Province: Carlos Ponce (until 10 December); Eduardo Mones Ruiz (starting 10 December)
- Vice Governor of Santa Cruz: Pablo González (until 10 December); Eugenio Quiroga (starting 10 December)
- Vice Governor of Santa Fe Province: Carlos Fascendini (until 10 December); Alejandra Rodenas (starting 10 December)
- Vice Governor of Santiago del Estero: Carlos Silva Neder
- Vice Governor of Tierra del Fuego:
  - until 10 December: Juan Carlos Arcando
  - 10 December-17 December: vacant
  - starting 10 December: Mónica Urquiza

== Events ==
=== January ===
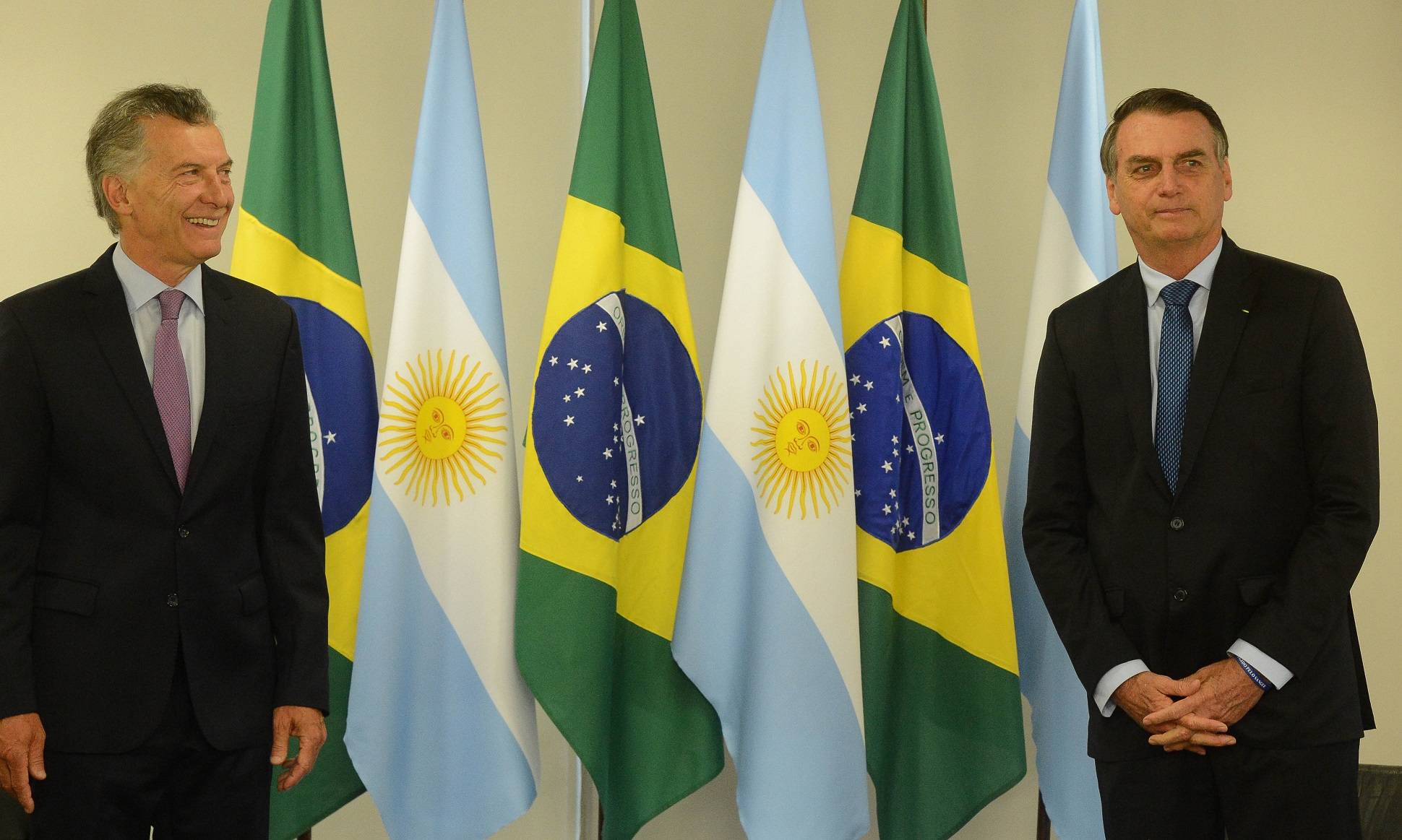
Mauricio Macri and Brazilian president Jair Bolsonaro.

- January 1: Jair Bolsonaro is inaugurated as president of Brazil. Chancellor Jorge Faurie attends the inauguration, as president Mauricio Macri was on vacation.
- January 2: Former president Fernando de la Rúa is hospitalized because of cardiac problems.
- January 3: The Argentine government reassured its claim in the Falkland Islands sovereignty dispute at the 186º anniversary of the British occupation in 1833.
- January 4: Cacerolazo in Buenos Aires against the raises in taxes.
- January 10: No Argentine politicians attend the second inauguration of Nicolás Maduro in Venezuela. Macri calls him a dictator in his Twitter account.
- January 14: Milagro Sala is sentenced to 13 years of prison, for corruption charges.
- January 15: Macri makes his first speech at the Santa Cruz Province, alongside kirchnerite governor Alicia Kirchner.
- January 16: Macri meets with Bolsonaro in Brasil. Both of them rejected Maduro as a dictator.
- January 18: The KKL honors the prosecutor Alberto Nisman with a memorial, four years after his death.
- January 21: Macri signs a decree to regulate the asset recovery from corruption cases.
- January 23
  - Macri acknowledges Juan Guaidó as President of Venezuela during the 2019 Venezuelan presidential crisis.
  - Kirchnerist politicians, on the other hand, support Maduro and consider the appointment of Guaidó as a coup d'état organized by the United States. Cristina Fernández de Kirchner, ally of Maduro during his presidency, did not make comments.
- January 27: La Rioja Province celebrates a referendum over an amendment to the provincial constitution, to allow governor Sergio Casas to run for a new term of office. The parties, however, do not agree on the interpretation of the results.
- January 29: After some weeks of speculation, governor María Eugenia Vidal announces that the provincial elections in the Buenos Aires Province will be held together with the 2019 Argentine general election.
- January 30
  - In line with Vidal, Buenos Aires mayor Horacio Rodríguez Larreta announces that the election in the Buenos Aires city will also be held together with the national ones.
  - Musician Manuel Vilca is hospitalized in Bolivia, and has to pay 17,000 US dollars for the treatments. This starts a diplomatic conflict between Jujuy governor Gerardo Morales and Bolivian president Evo Morales, as Bolivians are treated in Argentine hospitals for free.

=== February ===
- February 3: Agustín Zbar, president of the AMIA, resigns. He had proposed the DAIA to decline the case against former president Cristina Fernández de Kirchner, which the DAIA rejected. He is replaced by Ariel Eichbaum.

=== April ===
- April 25: Sinceramente, the first book written by Cristina Fernández de Kirchner, former President of Argentina and current Senator for the Buenos Aires Province, is released

== Predicted and scheduled events ==
=== May ===
- End of the 2018–19 Argentine Primera División tournament.

=== October ===
- Argentine general election, 2019

=== Unknown month ===
- Martín Fierro Awards ceremony.
- Superclásico

== Deaths ==
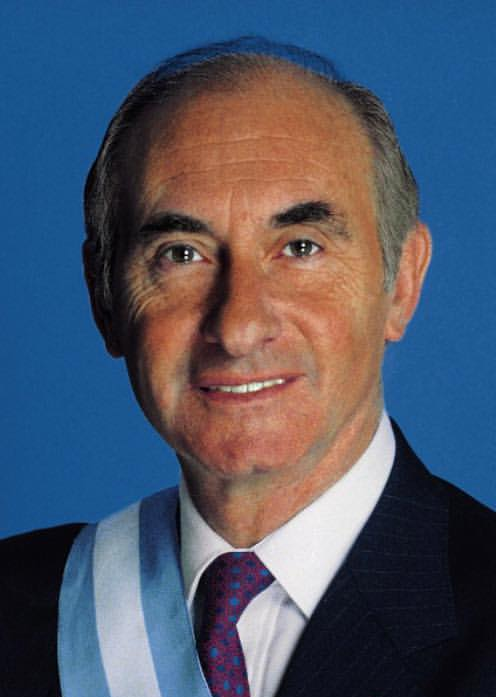
Fernando de la Rúa

- January 10 – Leo Satragno, musician.
- January 21 – Emiliano Sala, Argentine professional footballer (b. 1990)
- February 11 – Ricardo Boechat, Argentine-born Brazilian journalist (b. 1952)
- February 17 – Eduardo Bauza, first Chief of the Cabinet of Ministers of Argentina.
- February 23 – Natacha Jaitt, model.
- February 26 – Christian Bach, actress.
- March 2 – Franco Macri, Italian-Argentine businessman (b. 1930)
- May 5 – Paco Cabasés, Argentine professional footballer (b. 1916)
- July 9 – Fernando de la Rúa, 43rd President of Argentina (b. 1937)
- July 19 – César Pelli, Argentine-American architect (b. 1926)
- July 21 – Hugo Cóccaro, Argentine politician (b. 1954)
- August 12 – José Luis Brown, Argentine footballer (b. 1956)

== See also ==
- List of Argentine films of 2019
- 2019 Pan American Games
