= 2020 in Argentina =

- Decades: 2000s; 2010s; 2020s; 2030s
- See also: Other events of 2020; List of years in Argentina

Events in the year 2020 in Argentina.

== Incumbents ==
- President: Alberto Fernández
- Vice President: Cristina Fernández de Kirchner

=== Governors ===
- Governor of Buenos Aires Province: Axel Kicillof
- Governor of Catamarca Province: Raúl Jalil
- Governor of Chaco Province: Jorge Capitanich
- Governor of Chubut Province: Mariano Arcioni
- Governor of Córdoba: Juan Schiaretti
- Governor of Corrientes Province: Gustavo Valdés
- Governor of Entre Ríos Province: Gustavo Bordet
- Governor of Formosa Province: Gildo Insfrán
- Governor of Jujuy Province: Gerardo Morales
- Governor of La Pampa Province: Sergio Ziliotto
- Governor of La Rioja Province: Ricardo Quintela
- Governor of Mendoza Province: Rodolfo Suárez
- Governor of Misiones Province: Oscar Herrera Ahuad
- Governor of Neuquén Province: Omar Gutiérrez
- Governor of Río Negro Province: Arabela Carreras
- Governor of Salta Province: Gustavo Sáenz
- Governor of San Juan Province: Sergio Uñac
- Governor of San Luis Province: Alberto Rodríguez Saá
- Governor of Santa Cruz Province: Alicia Kirchner
- Governor of Santa Fe Province: Omar Perotti
- Governor of Santiago del Estero: Gerardo Zamora
- Governor of Tierra del Fuego: Gustavo Melella
- Governor of Tucumán: Juan Luis Manzur

=== Vice Governors ===
- Vice Governor of Buenos Aires Province: Verónica Magario
- Vice Governor of Catamarca Province: Rubén Dusso
- Vice Governor of Chaco Province: Analía Rach Quiroga
- Vice Governor of Corrientes Province: Gustavo Canteros
- Vice Governor of Entre Rios Province: María Laura Stratta
- Vice Governor of Formosa Province: Eber Wilson Solís
- Vice Governor of Jujuy Province: Carlos Haquim
- Vice Governor of La Pampa Province: Mariano Fernández
- Vice Governor of La Rioja Province: Florencia López
- Vice Governor of Misiones Province: Carlos Omar Arce
- Vice Governor of Nenquen Province: Marcos Koopmann
- Vice Governor of Rio Negro Province: Alejandro Palmieri
- Vice Governor of Salta Province: Antonio Marocco
- Vice Governor of San Juan Province: Roberto Gattoni
- Vice Governor of San Luis Province: Eduardo Mones Ruiz
- Vice Governor of Santa Cruz: Eugenio Quiroga
- Vice Governor of Santa Fe Province: Alejandra Rodenas
- Vice Governor of Santiago del Estero: Carlos Silva Neder
- Vice Governor of Tierra del Fuego: Mónica Urquiza

== Ongoing events ==
- COVID-19 pandemic in Argentina

== Events by month ==
=== January ===
- January 18 – Fernando Báez Sosa, an 18-year-old law student, is beaten to death by a group of amateur rugby players in Villa Gesell; the case gained nationwide notoriety.

=== March ===
- March 3 – The first case of COVID-19 was confirmed in Argentina: a 43-year-old man who had arrived two days earlier from Milan, Italy.
- March 7 – The Ministry of Health confirmed the country's first documented death of COVID-19, a 64-year-old man who had travelled to Paris, France, who also had other health conditions; the case was only confirmed as positive after the patient's demise.
- March 19 – A nation-wide lockdown was established in Argentina due to the COVID-19 pandemic.

=== May ===
- May 4 – New controls over the purchasing of American dollars by the Central Bank of Argentina came into force. The measures apply to both companies and individual savers.

=== August ===
- August 30 – Earth observation satellite SAOCOM 1B launches from SLC-40.

=== December ===
- December 15 – Yolanda's Law is published in the Official Bulletin of the Argentine Republic.
- December 30 – Abortion legalised by the Congress with 38 votes in favour and 29 against.

== Deaths ==
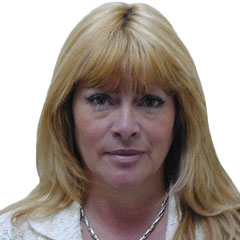
Stella Maris Leverberg

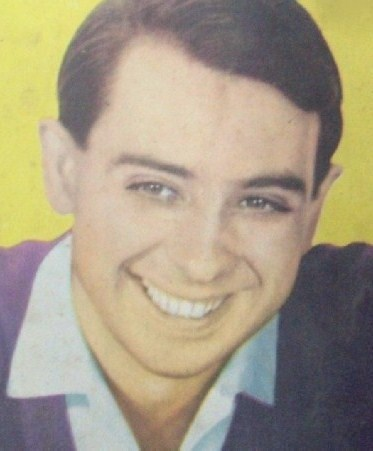
Juan Ramón

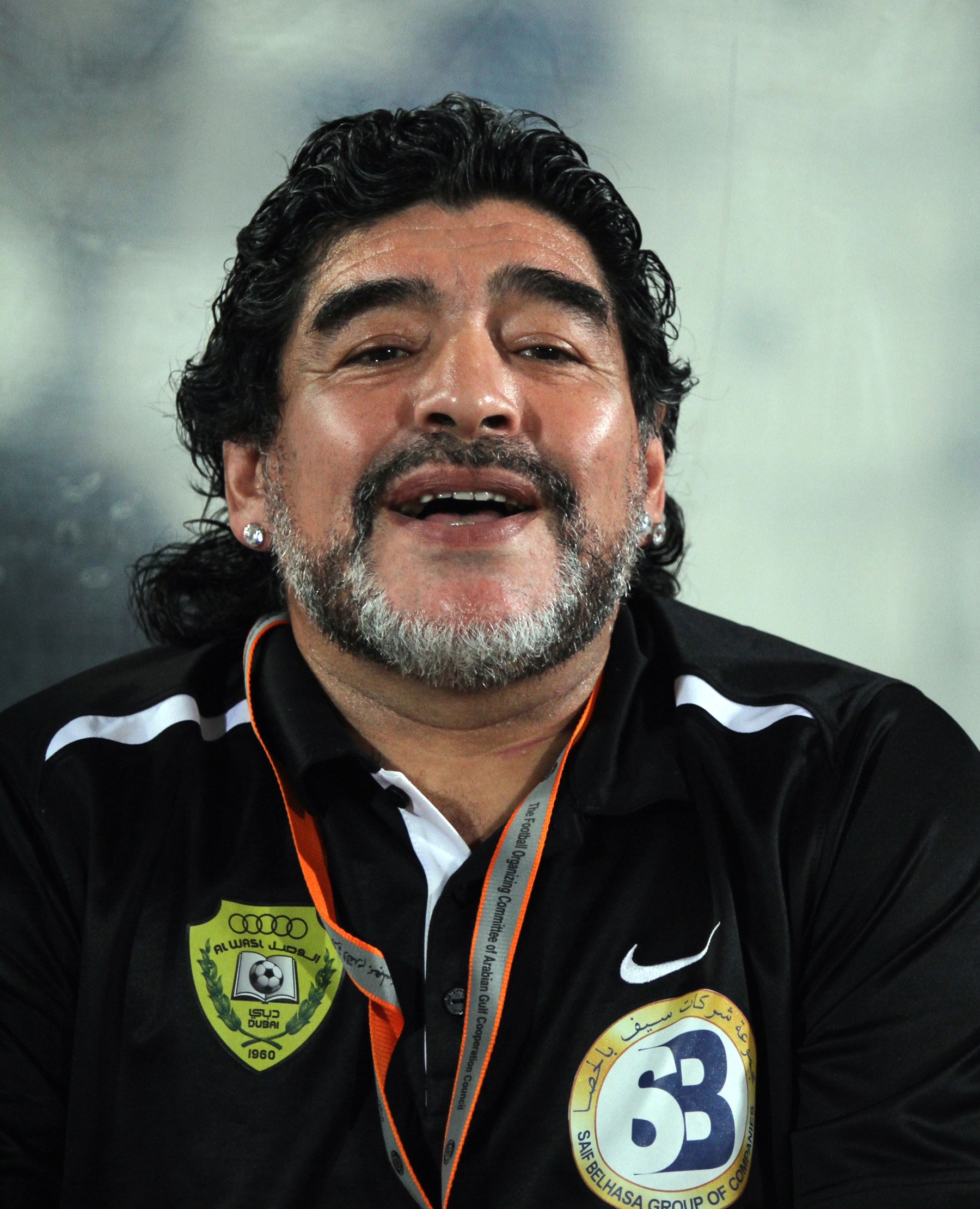
Diego Maradona

=== January ===
- January 3 – Stella Maris Leverberg, politician and trade unionist (b. 1962).
- January 9 – Pampero Firpo, wrestler (b. 1930).

=== February ===
- February 4 – Claudio Bonadio, federal judge (b. 1956).
- February 25 – Erico Spinadel, Austrian-Argentine industrial engineer (b. 1929).
- February 27 – Braian Toledo, javelin thrower (b. 1993).

=== March ===
- March 10 – Marcelo Peralta, saxophonist (b. 1961).
- March 13 – Alejandro Betts, historian and political activist (b. 1947).
- March 20 – Amadeo Carrizo, football player (b. 1926).
- March 27
  - Roberto Alemann, politician (b. 1922).
  - Elvia Andreoli, actress (b. 1950 or 1951).
- March 28 – Nicolás Brizuela, musician (b. 1949).

=== April ===
- April 1 – Mario Chaldú, football player (b. 1942).
- April 2 – Juan Giménez, comic book artist (b. 1943).

=== May ===
- May 15 - Sergio Denis, singer and actor (b. 1949).
- May 25 – Ricardo Barreda, convicted mass murderer (b. 1936).

=== July ===
- July 30 – Juan Ramón, singer and actor (b. 1940).

=== November ===
- November 25 – Diego Maradona, footballer (b. 1960).
