= Estela Neder =

Argentine politician (born 1957)

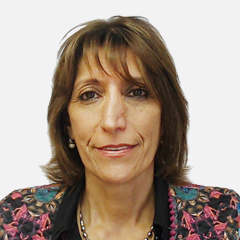

National Deputy
- Incumbent
- Assumed office 22 November 2017
- Constituency: Santiago del Estero

Provincial Deputy of Santiago del Estero
- In office 23 March 2009 – 21 November 2017

Personal details
- Born: 12 December 1957 (age 68) Santiago del Estero, Argentina
- Party: Civic Front for Santiago
- Other political affiliations: Frente de Todos (since 2019)
- Education: National University of Córdoba

Estela Mary del Rosario Neder (born 12 December 1957) is an Argentine nutritionist and politician, currently serving as National Deputy elected in Santiago del Estero since 2017. She is a member of the Civic Front for Santiago (FCpS). She sits in the Frente de Todos parliamentary bloc.

== Early life and career ==
Born in the city of Santiago del Estero, Neder studied nutrition at the National University of Córdoba, graduating in 1980. Starting in 1982, she was chief of services of the Hospital Regional Ramón Carrillo, in Santiago del Estero. A longtime member of the Justicialist Party, she was elected to the Loreto City Council in 2003. Her brother, José Emilio Neder, had previously served as mayor of Loreto from 1987 to 1991.

== Political career ==
She was elected as a member of the Chamber of Deputies of Santiago del Estero in 2009, and re-elected to a second term in 2013. She was the first alternate candidate in the FCpS list to the National Chamber of Deputiues in the 2015; in 2017, she took office as National Deputy filling in the vacancy left by José Alberto Herrera, who had been elected as mayor of Clodomira. She was sworn in on 22 November 2017, and formed part of the FCpS list.

Neder ran for re-election in the 2019 general election, heading the Frente de Todos list as the first candidate to the Chamber of Deputies. She was elected with 21.8% of the vote. She was sworn in on 4 December 2019, and formed part of the Frente de Todos parliamentary bloc, alongside the members of the FCpS.

Neder forms part of the parliamentary commissions on Social Action and Public Health, Disabilities, Elderly People, Families and Childhood, Population and Human Development and Addiction Prevention. In 2020, she voted against the legalisation of abortion in Argentina.
