= Neder (surname) =

Neder is a variant of Nader, a German occupational surname for a tailor. Notable people with this name include:

- Adam Neder (1865–1910), Bavarian emigrant to the United States
- Carlos Neder (1953–2021), Brazilian politician and physician
- Estela Neder (born 1957), Argentine nutritionist and politician
- José Emilio Neder (born 1954), Argentine politician
- Patricia Neder (born 1966), American former handball player
