= María Luisa Montoto =

Argentine politician (born 1952)

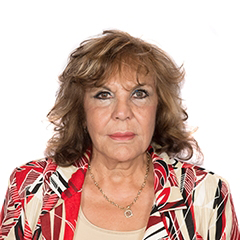

National Deputy
- Incumbent
- Assumed office 19 December 2019
- Constituency: Santiago del Estero

Personal details
- Born: 28 March 1952 (age 74) Santiago del Estero, Argentina
- Party: Civic Front for Santiago
- Other political affiliations: Frente de Todos (2019–2023); Union for the Homeland (2023–present)

María Luisa Montoto de Rogel (born 28 March 1952) is an Argentine ophthalmologist and politician, currently serving as National Deputy elected in Santiago del Estero since 2019. She is a member of the Civic Front for Santiago (FCpS). She sits in the Frente de Todos parliamentary bloc.

Born in the city of Santiago del Estero, Montoto previously served as a councilwoman in the city council of La Banda from 2018 to 2019. She was the third alternate candidate in the FCpS list to the National Chamber of Deputies in the 2017 legislative election. In 2019, Claudia Ledesma Abdala, who had been elected as deputy in the FCpS list, was elected to the National Senate, and Montoto was sworn in to fill her vacancy. Montoto was elected in her own right in the 2021 legislative election as the third candidate in the FCpS list, which received 64.8% of the vote.

Montoto forms part of the parliamentary commissions on Science, Technology and Productive Innovation, Disabilities, Elderly People, Families and Childhood, and Social Action and Public Health. In 2020, she voted against the legalisation of abortion in Argentina.

== Electoral history ==
Electoral history of María Luisa Montoto
Election	Office	List	#	District	Votes			Result	Ref.
Election	Office	List	#	District	Total	%	P.	Result	Ref.
2017	National Deputy	Civic Front for Santiago	1 alt.	Santiago del Estero Province	384,125	70.09%	1st (Note: Presented on an electoral list. The data shown represents the share of the vote the entire party/alliance received in that constituency.)	Not elected (Note: Assumed office on 9 December 2019 following the resignation of the first candidate on the list, Claudia Ledesma Abdala.)	
2021	National Deputy	Civic Front for Santiago	3	Santiago del Estero Province	363,144	64.88%	1st	Elected	
