= Graciela Navarro =

Argentine politician (born 1958)

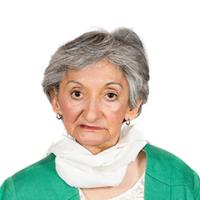
- Navarro in 2019.

National Deputy
- In office 10 December 2011 – 10 December 2023
- Constituency: Santiago del Estero

Provincial Deputy of Santiago del Estero
- In office 10 December 2009 – 10 December 2011

Personal details
- Born: 26 December 1958 (age 67) Monte Quemado, Argentina
- Party: Radical Civic Union (until 2005); Civic Front for Santiago (since 2005)
- Other political affiliations: Frente de Todos (since 2019)

Graciela "Chaco" Navarro (born 26 December 1958) is an Argentine politician. She served as National Deputy elected in Santiago del Estero from 2011 to 2023. A member of the Civic Front for Santiago (FCpS), she has sat in the Frente de Todos parliamentary bloc from 2019 to 2023.

== Early life and career ==
Navarro was born on 26 December 1958 in Monte Quemado, a city in Northern Santiago del Estero Province. Her political career began in the Radical Civic Union (UCR): she served as a member of the party's Santiago del Estero Provincial Committee from 2011 to 2005, and as secretary of the committee from 1997 to 2011.

Navarro's first political post was as a member of the city council of Santiago del Estero, in 2001. She was re-elected for a second two-year term in 2003. In 2009, she was elected to the provincial Chamber of Deputies.

== Congresswoman ==
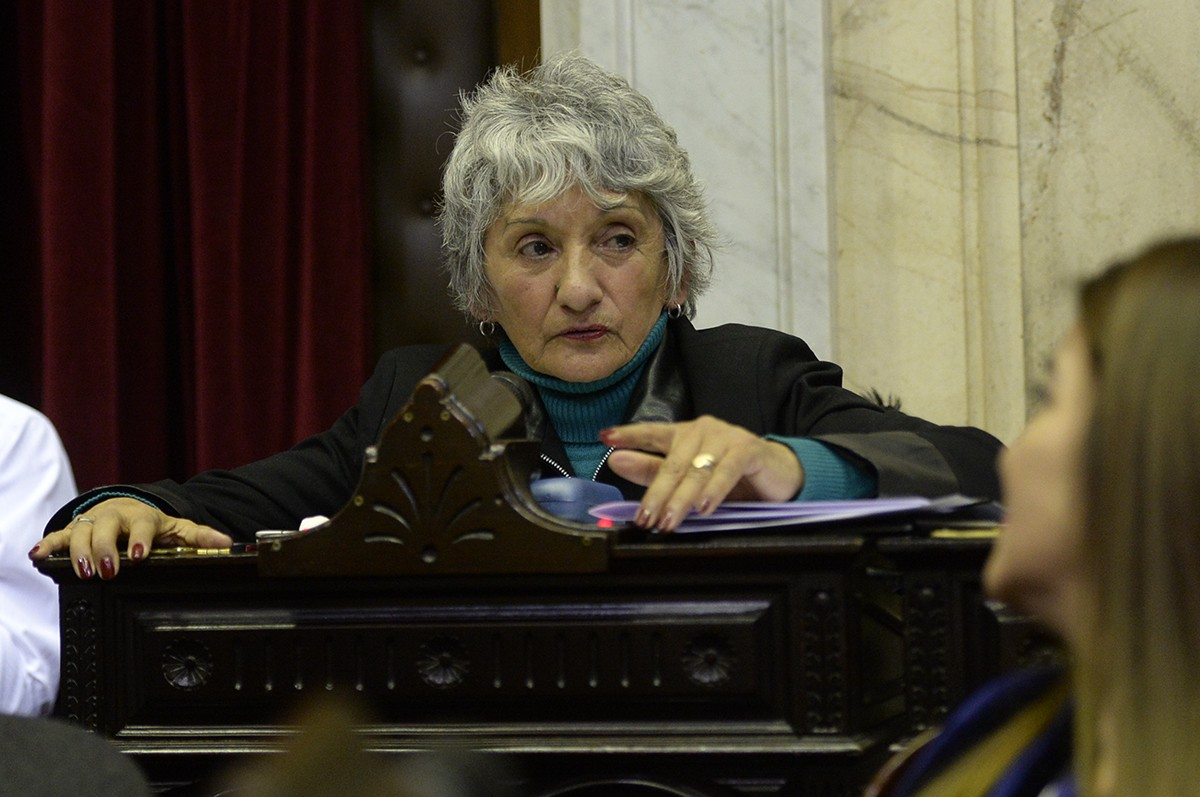
Navarro in the Argentine Chamber of Deputies in 2018.

In the 2011 election to the National Chamber of Deputies, Navarro was the first alternate candidate in the Civic Front for Santiago list, which received 71.03% of the vote and elected all four seats up for grabs. Jorge Raúl Pérez, the third candidate in the list, died shortly before the new Congress was due to take office, on 11 November 2011. As alternate candidate, Navarro took office in his stead.

In the 2015 election, Navarro ran for re-election as the third candidate in the Civic Front list. The FCpS received 65.67% of the vote, and Navarro was elected. She was re-elected for a third term in 2019 as the second candidate in the FCpS list, which received 56.66% of the vote. Following the 2019 election, Navarro and the other FCpS deputies formed part of the Frente de Todos parliamentary bloc in the Chamber.

During her 2019–2023 term, Navarro formed part of the parliamentary commissions on Culture, Budget and Finances, Economy, Population and Human Development, and Sports. She was an opponent of the legalisation of abortion in Argentina, voting against the Voluntary Interruption of Pregnancy bills debated by the Argentine Congress in 2018 and 2020, the latter of which eventually passed and went on to legalise abortion in 2021.

== Personal life ==
Navarro suffered from throat cancer and underwent surgery in 2017 after it metastasised to her brain. In 2018, during a visit to General Roca, Río Negro for a mass in honour of Ceferino Namuncurá, Navarro suffered a stroke and fell into a brief coma. In 2020, she contracted COVID-19, but recovered satisfactorily.

Navarro is Roman Catholic, and a devotee of Ceferino Namuncurá. She is married to Jaime Sesse.
