= Emilio Rached =

Argentine politician

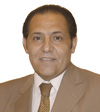

National Senator
- In office 10 December 2007 – 10 December 2013
- Constituency: Santiago del Estero

Vice Governor of Santiago del Estero
- In office 2005–2007
- Governor: Gerardo Zamora
- Preceded by: Joaquín Botta
- Succeeded by: Blanca Porcel

Mayor of Villa General Mitre
- In office 1995–2005
- Succeeded by: Guillermo Ganón

Personal details
- Born: 2 June 1959 (age 66) Rosario, Santa Fe Province
- Party: Radical Civic Union

Emilio Alberto Rached (born 2 June 1959 in Rosario, Santa Fe Province) is an Argentine politician, formerly of the Radical Civic Union. Elected for the Civic Front for Santiago, he sat in the Argentine Senate representing Santiago del Estero Province and supporting the majority block of the Front for Victory from 2007 to 2013.

Rached was born in Rosario but soon after his family returned to Santiago del Estero Province. His father's parents, of Lebanese origin, had settled in Villa General Mitre (Pinto) in 1921 and Rached grew up there. He studied at primary and secondary schools in Rosario and began studies to become a lawyer at the Catholic University of Santiago del Estero but did not finish. At 22 he became president of his local football club, Club Atlético Social Pinto.

From 1981 Rached became active in student and community politics, ahead of the return to democracy. In 1983, he joined the Radical Civic Union (UCR). In 1985 he was elected to take part in the constitutional reform. In 1993 he was elected as a Pinto councillor and in 1995 he was elected as Mayor of Pinto and served for ten years.

In 2005 he stood as running mate to Gerardo Zamora for the governorship of the province. Although both Radicals, they headed the Civic Front for Santiago, an alliance of Radicals and Peronists which supported then national President Néstor Kirchner. Zamora in particular is identified as a leading 'Radical K'. Elected as vice-governor, in 2007 Rached was elected to the Argentine Senate, again for the Civic Front. He and his fellow Civic Front senator Ada Del Valle Itúrrez form their own block but support the Kirchners' Front for Victory in opposition to the UCR block.
