= Elías Suárez =

Argentine politician

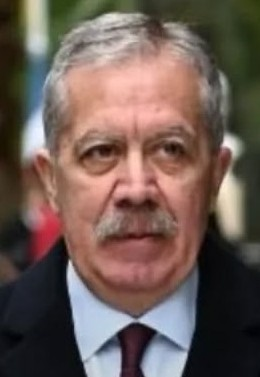

Governor of Santiago del Estero
- Incumbent
- Assumed office 10 December 2025
- Vice Governor: Carlos Silva Neder
- Preceded by: Gerardo Zamora

Personal details
- Born: Elías Miguel Suárez; 24 February 1956 (age 70) Santiago del Estero, Argentina
- Party: Radical Civic Union
- Other political affiliations: Civic Front for Santiago (2005–present)
- Education: National University of the Littoral

Elías Miguel Suárez (born 24 February 1956) is an Argentine politician who has served as governor of Santiago del Estero Province since 10 December 2025.

A member of the Civic Front for Santiago, he has been aligned with the administrations of Gerardo Zamora and Zamora's wife, Claudia Ledesma Abdala. Suárez served as chief of staff to both Zamora and Ledesma Abdala during the entirety of their governorships, from 2005 up until his election as governor in 2025.

== Early life and career ==
Elías Miguel Suárez was born in Santiago del Estero on 24 February 1956, the son of Elías Suárez and María Águeda Viva. He initially studied agricultural engineering at the National University of Córdoba in Córdoba, and later continued his studies at the National University of the Littoral campus in Esperanza, Santa Fe Province.

== Political career ==
His first political position was as undersecretary of press for the municipality of Santiago del Estero in 1999. He became director of institutional relations in 2001 and municipal secretary of government in 2003, while Gerardo Zamora was serving as mayor. When Zamora was elected governor in 2005, Suárez was appointed cabinet chief. He remained in the position without interruption throughout the successive administrations of Zamora and his wife, Claudia Ledesma Abdala, until 2025. With their support, he was elected governor as the Civic Front for Santiago candidate in the provincial election held in October that year, with Carlos Silva Neder as his running mate for vice governor.

Upon taking office, Suárez appointed a cabinet largely composed of officials associated with Zamora's provincial administrations, reinforcing expectations of political continuity with Suárez's longtime ally. Víctor Araujo, a former mayor of Fernández affiliated with the Peronist wing of the governing coalition, was appointed chief of the Cabinet, while Ángel Niccolai, Atilio Chara, and Aldo Hid remained in charge of the social development, economy, and public works ministries, respectively.

== Personal life ==
He has been married to agricultural engineer Mirta de las Mercedes Hemgren since 1980, and they have two children.

== Electoral history ==
Electoral history of Elías Suárez
| Election | Office | List | Votes | | | Result | Ref. |
| Election | Office | List | Total | % | P. | Result | Ref. |
|---|---|---|---|---|---|---|---|
| 2025 | Governor of Santiago del Estero | Civic Front for Santiago | 437,556 | 73.85% | 1st | Elected | |

Political offices
| Preceded by Gerardo Zamora | Governor of Santiago del Estero; 2025–present | Incumbent |
