= Statistics of the COVID-19 pandemic in Argentina =

This article presents official statistics gathered during the COVID-19 pandemic in Argentina. The National Ministry of Health publishes official numbers every night.

Number of cases (blue) and number of deaths (red) on a logarithmic scale.

Since 12 March 2020, contrasted data between the numbers reported by the provincial ministries and the total number provided by the national Ministry of Health show differences. This is because the ministries are giving their reports at different times throughout the day and also to different criteria regarding the counting of infected: by district of hospitalization or district of residence.

On 27 September 2020, the Ministry of Health of the Province of Buenos Aires (the most populated one) reported more than 3,500 extra deaths that were missed in previous reports. The provincial government called this a "re-categorization", and presented a new data entry system which —according to Provincial Health Minister Daniel Gollán— would avoid future under-reporting and data criticism. The deaths were later included in the national report of 1 October 2020.

On 9 September 2021, by request of the 24 jurisdictions and because the manual loading of data from discharges of patients generates an overload in the epidemiological surveillance system, a change was applied in the algorithm for classificacion of active/non-active cases in the National Health Surveillance System, in which cases not classified as deceased and with more than 90 days elapsed from notification date became classified as non-active.

Model-based simulations for Argentina indicate that the 95% confidence interval for the time-varying reproduction number R_{t} exceeded 1.0 from April to July 2020, after which it diminished to below 1.0 in October and November 2020.

== Maps ==
Number of confirmed cases by province.

Number of confirmed COVID-19 deaths by province.

Number of confirmed COVID-19 cases by jurisdiction.

Number of confirmed COVID-19 cases by jurisdiction in Greater Buenos Aires.

== Progression charts ==
=== Cumulative cases ===
==== Nationwide ====
The charts show the development of the pandemic starting from 1 March 2020, representing changes in net number of cases on a daily basis, based on the number of cases reported in the National Ministry of Health's daily reports.

View source data.
View source data.

==== By province ====
The charts show the development of the pandemic starting from 1 March 2020, representing changes in net number of cases on a daily basis, based on the number of cases reported in the daily reports by each province.

View source data.

=== Daily cases ===
View source data.
View source data.
View source data.

=== Medical care ===
The charts show the development of ICU beds occupation related to the pandemic starting from 24 June 2020, representing changes in net number of beds occupation on a daily basis, based on the numbers reported in the National Ministry of Health's daily reports.

View source data.
View source data.
View source data.

== Vaccine distribution ==
The charts show the development of vaccination in Argentina starting from 6 January 2021, based on the National Ministry of Health's reports.

View source data.

Vaccinated population (2022-01-20)
One dose	39,229,725
Full vaccination	34,365,507
Extra/booster dose	10,624,440

== Demographics ==
Confirmed COVID-19 cases in Argentina by sex and age
Classification		Cases	
Classification		Number	(%)
All		5287443	100.0
Sex	Male	2587038	48.9
Sex	Female	2657520	50.3
Sex	Other	42889	0.8
Age	Above 80	125964	2.4
Age	70–79	212199	4.0
Age	60–69	412840	7.8
Age	50–59	698800	13.2
Age	40–49	1015203	19.2
Age	30–39	1200265	22.7
Age	20–29	1076677	20.4
Age	10–19	414141	7.8
Age	0–9	131354	2.5
Classification		Deaths	Lethality (%)
All		115935	2.2
Source: Ministry of Health, including data through 29 October 2021.

View source data.

== See also ==
- COVID-19 pandemic by country
- COVID-19 pandemic in South America
- Timeline of the COVID-19 pandemic in Argentina
- 2020 in Argentina
- 2021 in Argentina
