= 2018 opening of regular sessions of the National Congress of Argentina =

Speech by Argentine president Mauricio Macri

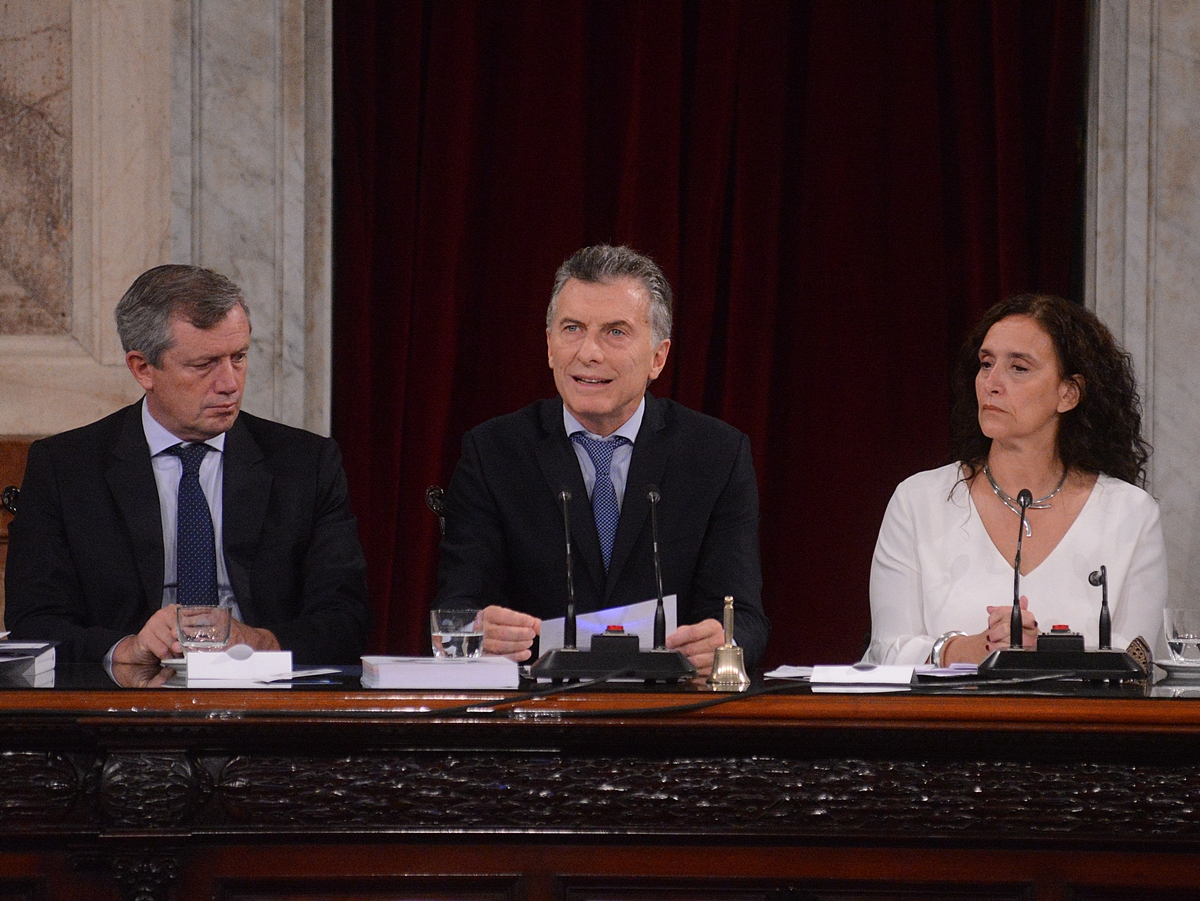
- President Mauricio Macri delivers his speech
- Date: 1 March 2018
- Venue: National Congress of Argentina
- Location: Buenos Aires, Argentina
- Type: Opening of regular sessions of the National Congress of Argentina
- Participants: Mauricio Macri

The 2018 opening of regular sessions of the National Congress of Argentina took place on 1 March, 2018. It was a speech delivered by president Mauricio Macri at the National Congress of Argentina.

== Contents and delivery ==
=== Economy ===
Macri pointed that unemployment and inflation are decreasing in the country. He said that if he had made reforms too quickly it would have caused an economic crisis, and if he did not made reforms the country would have faced a crisis similar to the one in Venezuela.

=== Education ===
Macri commented that education in Argentina is in a poor state, citing the results of the "Aprender" exams. He considered that this would leave the new generations unprepared to access high quality jobs in the future. He criticised the unions of the sector, accusing them of neglecting the educative needs for political gain and only being concerned about wages.

=== Crime ===
The president pointed that the country has a clear strategy for dealing with illegal drug trade, which would be bearing fruit. He also called to update the penal code. As for crime in general, he rejected both police brutality and pro-crime policies as viable solutions.

=== Abortion ===
Although Macri defined himself as "pro-life", he encouraged the Congress to have an abortion debate and discuss a potential abortion law.

== Responses ==
Former president Eduardo Duhalde criticised Macri and considered that his government does not seek enough political consensus for its actions. Former president and then senator Cristina Fernández de Kirchner and her son, deputy Máximo Kirchner, did not attend the ceremony, and stayed at their home in Calafate.
