= José Emilio Neder =

Argentine politician

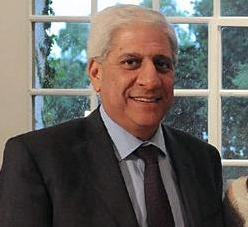

National Senator
- Incumbent
- Assumed office 10 December 2019
- Constituency: Santiago del Estero

Vice Governor of Santiago del Estero
- In office 10 December 2013 – 10 December 2019
- Governor: Claudia Ledesma Abdala (2013–2017); Gerardo Zamora (2017–2019)
- Preceded by: Ángel Niccolai
- Succeeded by: Carlos Silva Neder

Mayor of Loreto
- In office 10 December 1987 – 10 December 1991

Personal details
- Born: 13 March 1954 (age 72) Loreto, Santiago del Estero, Argentina
- Party: Justicialist Party
- Other political affiliations: Civic Front for Santiago (2005–present); Frente de Todos (2019–present)

José Emilio Neder (born 13 March 1954) is an Argentine politician, currently serving as a National Senator for Santiago del Estero since 2019. He belongs to the Justicialist Party, and has formed part of the Civic Front for Santiago since its foundation in 2005.

Neder previously served as vice governor of Santiago del Estero under Claudia Ledesma Abdala and Gerardo Zamora, from 2013 to 2019. Earlier, he had served as Minister of Government under Zamora during his second term, from 2009 to 2013. Prior to that, from 1987 to 1991, he was intendente of his hometown of Loreto. Additionally, Neder has been president of the Santiago del Estero chapter of the Justicialist Party since 2015.

Neder belongs to a political family. His sister, Estela Neder, is an elected national deputy. His nephew, Carlos Silva Neder, is also active in provincial politics and succeeded him as vice governor in 2019.
