= Chamber of Deputies of Santiago del Estero =

Legislative body of Santiago del Estero Province, Argentina

Type
- Type: Unicameral

Leadership
- President (Vice Governor): Carlos Silva Neder (FCpS) since 10 December 2017
- Provisional President: Norma Abdala de Matarazzo (FCpS) since 10 December 2021
- First Vice President: Juan Manuel Beltramino (FCpS) since 10 December 2021

Structure
- Seats: 40 legislators
- Political groups: Government (16): Civic Front for Santiago (16); Allies (12): Justicialist Party (12); Opposition (12): Juntos por el Cambio (5); Progressive Renewal Front (4); Patriotic Labour Front (3)
- Length of term: 4 years
- Authority: Constitution of Santiago del Estero

Elections
- Voting system: Proportional representation
- Last election: 14 November 2021
- Next election: 2025

Meeting place
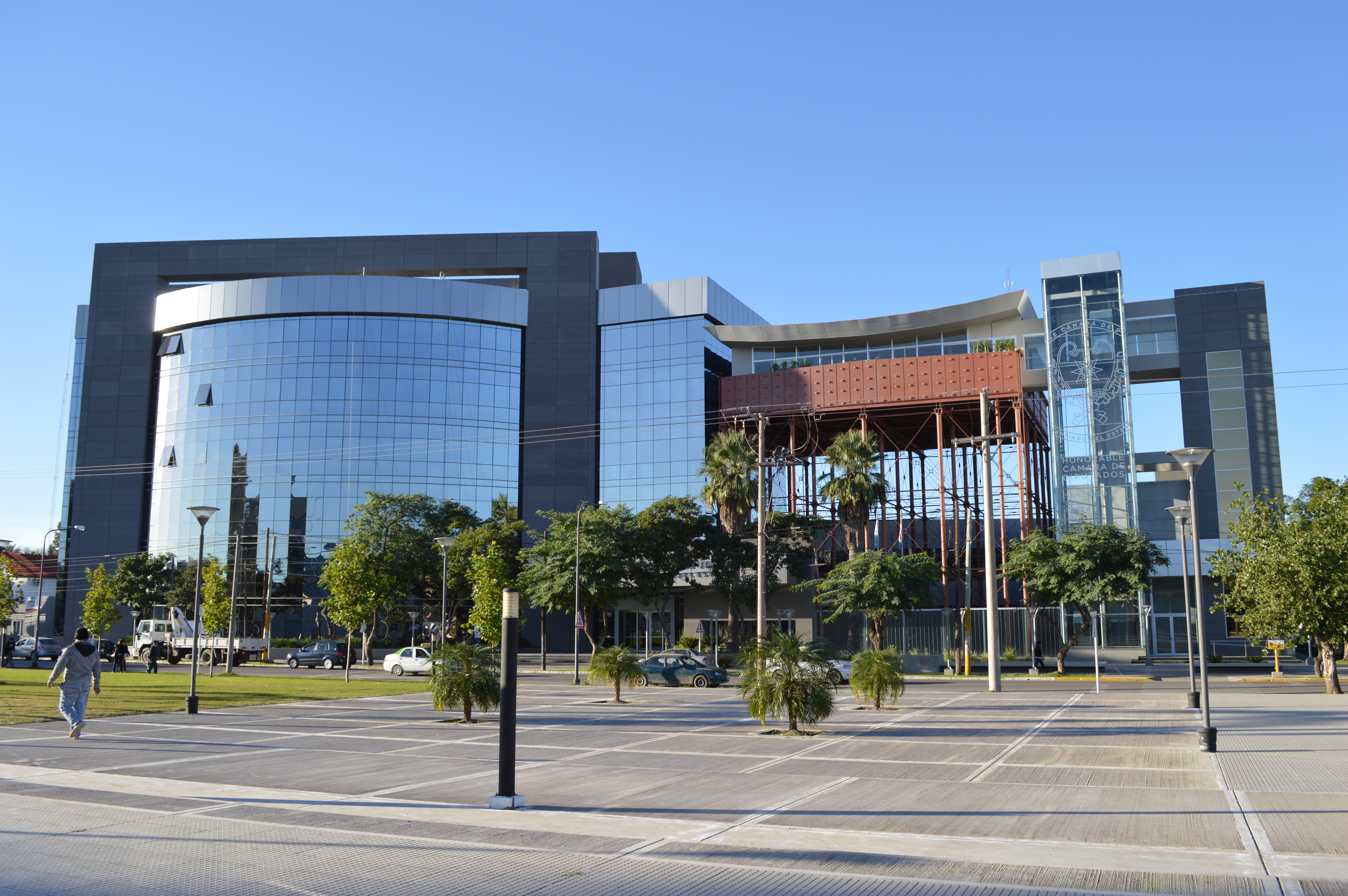
- Edificio de la Cámara de Diputados, Santiago del Estero, Santiago del Estero Province

Website
- legislaturasde.gob.ar

The Chamber of Deputies of Santiago del Estero Province (Spanish: Cámara de Diputados de la Provincia de Santiago del Estero) is the unicameral legislative body of Santiago del Estero Province, in Argentina. It comprises 40 legislators, elected in a single province-wide multi-member district through proportional representation using the D'Hondt system.

The Chamber convenes in the provincial capital, the City of Santiago del Estero. The president ex officio of the Chamber is the vice governor of the province, who is elected every four years alongside the governor of Santiago del Estero. For day-to-day affairs, the presidency of the chamber is held by the provisional president.

== History ==
The establishment of the first legislature of Santiago del Estero was brought about by the adoption of the province's first constitution, in July 1956, during the governorship of Manuel Taboada. The first legislative body was known as the Hall of Representatives, and counted with 16 sitting members and 6 alternate members: the sum of all of these served as the first constitutional convention. Members of the Hall of Representatives initially served only two years in their post.

In 1870, the cabildo of Santiago del Estero became the seat of the provincial legislature. Later, in 1928, the body moved to the old building of the Teatro 25 de Mayo. This would remain as the legislature's official seat until 2004.

In 2002, following a declaration of a state of "political instability" by governor and caudillo Carlos Juárez, elections were rescheduled to take place a year earlier than anticipated. Subsequent federal interventions continued to alter the province's electoral schedules. Since then, Santiago del Estero has maintained an altered electoral calendar wherein all province-wide offices (both the governor and the Chamber of Deputies) are elected the same year midterm elections to the National Congress are held. Santiago del Estero and Corrientes are the only two provinces currently employing this electoral calendar.

== Building ==
Since 2014, the Chamber of Deputies has convened in a new building built with the exclusive purpose of housing both meetings of the body and legislative offices of its members. It is located on the corner of Avenida Roca and Patagonia, in the provincial capital, near the city's central bus station and not far from the governor's offices. The building was inaugurated by Governor Claudia Ledesma Abdala on 8 April 2014.
