= Federico Pinedo =

Argentine politician

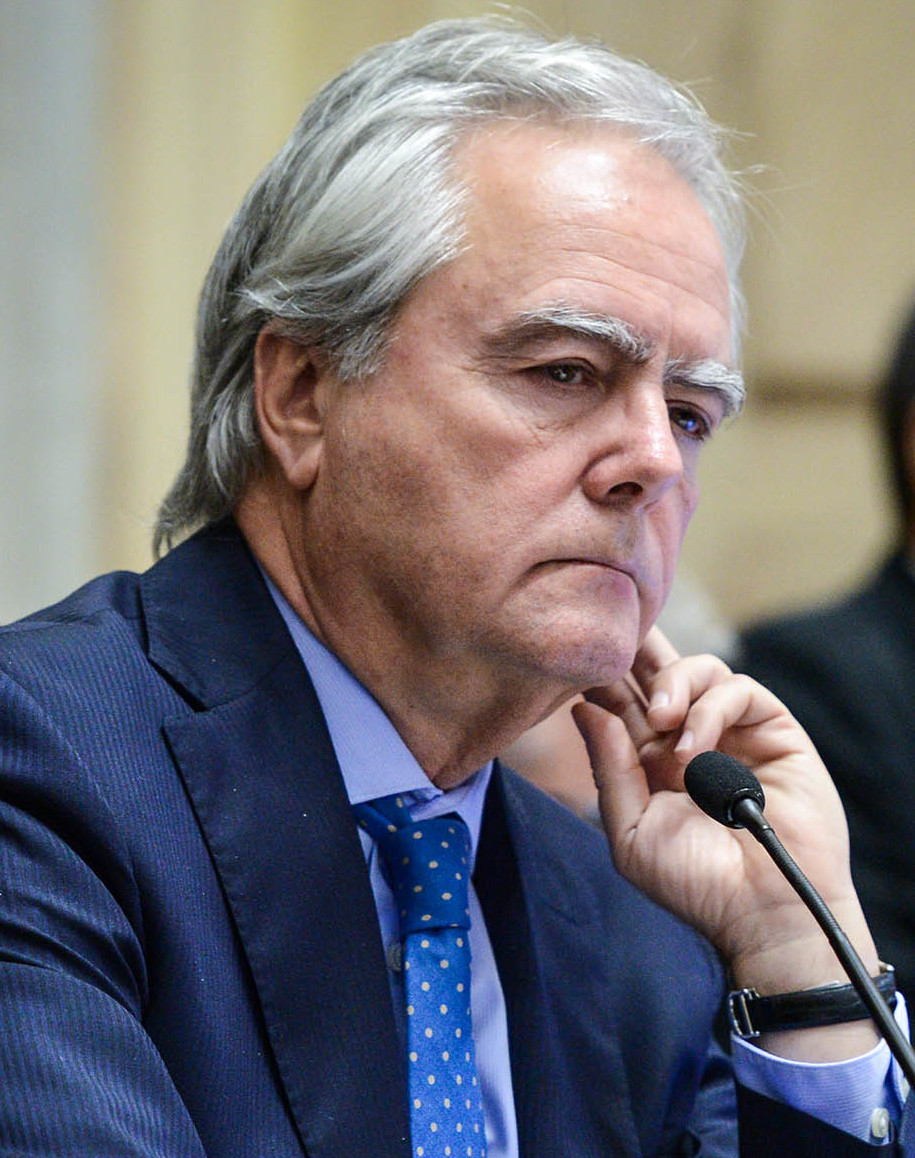

Acting President of Argentina (Note: Provisional President of the Argentine Senate in exercise of the Executive Branch)
- In office 10 December 2015 0:00 AM – 11:45 AM
- Vice President: Vacant
- Preceded by: Cristina Fernández de Kirchner
- Succeeded by: Mauricio Macri

Provisional President of the Senate
- In office 3 December 2015 – 10 December 2019
- Preceded by: Gerardo Zamora
- Succeeded by: Claudia Ledesma Abdala
Legislative offices
National Senator
In office 10 December 2015 – 10 December 2019
Constituency	City of Buenos Aires
National Deputy
In office 10 December 2003 – 10 December 2015
Constituency	City of Buenos Aires

Personal details
- Born: 29 December 1955 (age 70) Buenos Aires, Argentina
- Party: Republican Proposal (2008–present); Commitment to Change (2003–2008); Democratic Party (1993–2003); Union of the Democratic Centre (1982–1993); New Force (1972–1976)
- Other political affiliations: Juntos por el Cambio (since 2015)

Federico Pinedo (Spanish pronunciation: [feðeˈɾiko piˈneðo]; born 29 December 1955) is an Argentine politician, served briefly as the acting President of Argentina in 2015, and provisional president of the Argentine Senate between 2015 and 2019.

As a chief of Republican Proposal in the lower house of National Congress of Argentina, he opposed same-sex marriage and legalization of abortion, representing the conservative vision of the party in different social policies.

== Acting presidency (2015) ==
On 10 December 2015, the court, led by María Romilda Servini, ruled that outgoing President Cristina Fernández de Kirchner's presidential term ended on 9 December 2015. Pinedo, as the provisional president of the Senate, based on the Argentine presidential line of succession, assumes presidential powers and duties from midnight of 10 December until Mauricio Macri assumed office on the noon of the same day.

== Notes ==
Political offices
Preceded by Gerardo Zamora	Provisional President of the Senate; 2015–2019	Succeeded by Claudia Ledesma Abdala
