= Mercedes Aragonés de Juárez =

Argentine politician (1926–2023)

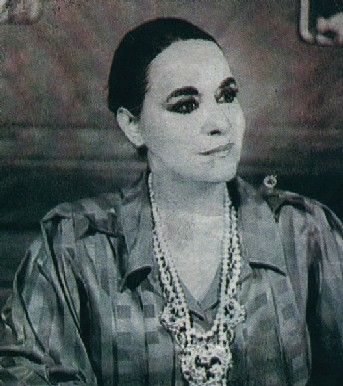

Governor of Santiago del Estero
- In office 12 December 2002 – 1 April 2004
- Vice Governor: Darío Moreno; Joaquín Botta
- Preceded by: Darío Moreno (interim)
- Succeeded by: Pablo Lanusse (interim)

Vice Governor of Santiago del Estero
- In office 10 December 1999 – 15 December 2001
- Governor: Carlos Arturo Juárez
- Preceded by: Luis María Juan José Peña
- Succeeded by: Ricardo Leguizamón

National Deputy
- In office 10 December 1993 – 1 September 1999
- Constituency: Santiago del Estero

Personal details
- Born: 12 September 1926 Santiago del Estero, Argentina
- Died: 25 July 2023 (aged 96) Santiago del Estero, Argentina
- Party: Justicialist
- Spouse: Carlos Arturo Juárez

Mercedes Mariana "Nina" Aragonés de Juárez (12 September 1926 – 25 July 2023) was an Argentine politician who was Governor of Santiago del Estero Province from 2002 to 2004. The wife of longtime governor and local caudillo Carlos Arturo Juárez, Aragonés was the last head of a provincial state in Argentina removed from office through federal intervention.

== Biography ==
Mercedes Aragonés de Juárez was born on 12 September 1926. She was the second-ever woman to serve as governor of a province in Argentina, and the first in Santiago del Estero. She assumed office upon the resignation of Governor Carlos Ricardo Díaz, in whose ticket Aragonés had been elected as vice-governor. In 2004, facing numerous accusations of corruption and embezzlement, she was removed from office by President Néstor Kirchner through federal intervention, a constitutional mechanism wherein the federal government of Argentina can intervene in a provincial government.

In addition to the governorship, she held the positions of National Deputy representing Santiago del Estero, Minister of Women's Affairs, and president of the provincial chapter of the Female Peronist Party.

Aragonés de Juárez died on 25 July 2023, at the age of 96.

Political offices
Preceded by Darío Moreno (interim)	Governor of Santiago del Estero; 2002–2004	Succeeded by Pablo Lanusse (interim)
