= Juan Ramón (singer) =

Argentine actor (1940–2020)

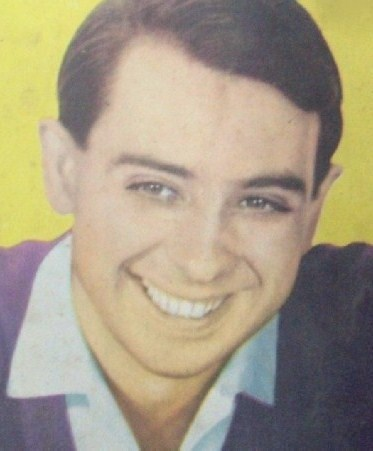
Juan Ramón, 1965

Juan Ramón (born as Ellery Guy Rech; 13 January 1940 – 30 July 2020) was an Argentine singer and actor.

He was born in Cañada de Gómez, Santa Fe to an Italian father from Veneto in Northern Italy and an Argentine mother of Italian descent from Campana, Buenos Aires.

Juan Ramón died of pneumonia in Buenos Aires on 30 July 2020.

== Discography ==
Albums

- Entre campeonas... Un Campeón (1961)
- Juan Ramón con la juventud (1962)
- Jóvenes... jóvenes... (1963)
- Siempre con la juventud (1963)
- Aniversario (1964)
- Juan Ramón solo!!! (1964)
- Con nosotros!! (1965)
- Más Corazón que nunca! (1965)
- Si no te tuviera más (1966)
- Venecia sin ti - Muñeca de cera (1966)
- Juan Ramón en Benidorm (1967)
- Juan Ramón (1967)
- Juan Ramón en Roma (en italiano, 1967)
- El máximo (1968)
- A todo ritmo (1968)
- Juan Ramón (1969)
- Otra vez Juan Ramón (1970)
- De amor ya no se muere (1974)
- Más y más!!! Juan Ramón hoy (1983)
- Juan Ramón 84 (1984)
- Otra vez Nº 1 (1984)
- El fenómeno (1985)
- El ídolo (1986)
- Los inéditos de Juan Ramón (1985)
- Voz de pueblo voz de Dios (1986)
- Firme junto al pueblo (1987)
- Internacional (1987)
- ¡Super bailable! (1988)
- Amor en Budapest (1989)
- Show '90 (1990)
- Pasito tun tun (1991)
- Sacala a bailar (1992)
- Reencuentro (1997)
- El corazón que canta (2001)
- El ídolo eterno (2005)
- Como no creer en Dios (2009)
- Bachatas... y algo más! (2012)
- Infiel (2013)
