= Julio Blanck =

Argentine journalist and television personality

- Born: Julio Ivnisky; June 28, 1954
- Died: September 7, 2018 (aged 64)
- Occupation: Editor
- Years active: 1977-2018

Julio Ivnisky (28 June 1954 – 7 September 2018), known as Julio Blanck, was an Argentine journalist and television personality.

== Biography ==
Blanck was born on 28 June 1954. He came from a Jewish family. He studied chemistry and journalism. He started working in the Clarín newspaper in 1977, at the sports section. He also worked in the "Goles Match" sports magazine from 1980 to 1982. He was transferred to the political section during the 1982 Falklands War. He became the chief of the section in 1992, and stayed in that position until 2002.

He was the editor in chief from 2003 to 2016. He made special reports from the United States, Great Britain, Brazil, Israel, Italy, Colombia, Uruguay, Mexico and Switzerland. He made interviews to all the presidents of Argentina from Raúl Alfonsín to Mauricio Macri, as well as Cuban socialist revolutionary and late former president Fidel Castro. He has worked in the TV programs Participar (1985), Confrontación (1986–1999), Scanner (2001–2007) and Código Político (2008–2018).

Blanck died of pancreatic cancer on 7 September 2018, aged 64.
