= Clodomira =

Coordinates: 27°35′S 64°08′W

- Municipality and village
- Interactive map of Clodomira
- Country: Argentina
- Province: Santiago del Estero
- Department: Banda Department
- Time zone: UTC−3 (ART)

Clodomira is a municipality and village in Santiago del Estero in Argentina.
