= Paco Cabasés =

Argentine footballer (1916–2019)

Personal information
- Full name: Francisco Cabasés
- Date of birth: 24 June 1916
- Date of death: 5 May 2019 (aged 102)
- Place of death: Córdoba, Argentina

Senior career*
Years	Team	Apps	(Gls)
- Talleres
- * Club domestic league appearances and goals

Francisco Cabasés (24 June 1916 – 5 May 2019) was an Argentine professional footballer who played for Talleres.
