= Opening of regular sessions of the National Congress of Argentina =

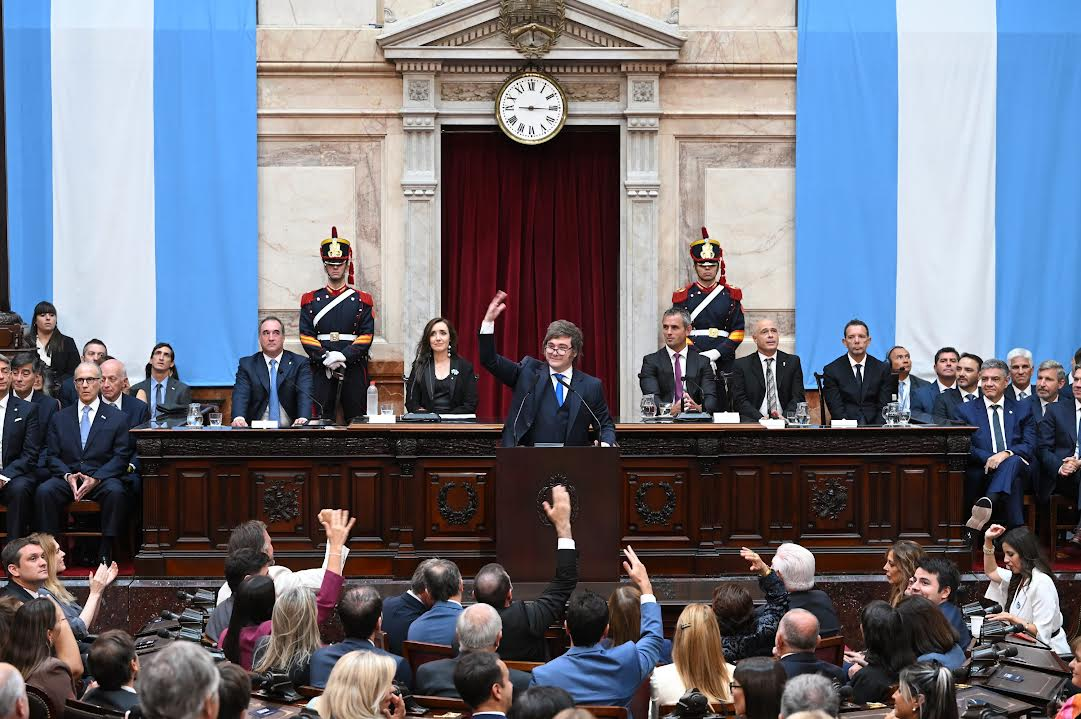
President Javier Milei opens the regular sessions on March 1, 2026.

The Opening of regular sessions of the National Congress of Argentina (Spanish: Apertura de sesiones ordinarias del Congreso de la Nación Argentina) is a ceremony that takes place annually, on March 1. It is headed by the President of Argentina, who before both houses of the National Congress of Argentina, meeting jointly in Legislative Assembly. The president delivers a speech, detailing the state of the country and announcing bills that the executive power may send to the Congress in the coming year. These speeches are delivered in Cadena nacional. The most recent one took place on 1 March 2025, when Javier Milei opened the 143º regular sessions.

== See also ==
- State of the Union
