= Carlos Silva Neder =

Argentine politician

Vice Governor of Santiago del Estero
- Incumbent
- Assumed office 10 December 2019
- Governor: Gerardo Zamora; Elías Suárez
- Preceded by: José Emilio Neder

Provisional President of the Chamber of Deputies of Santiago del Estero
- In office 10 December 2017 – 10 December 2019
- Preceded by: Blanca Porcel
- Succeeded by: Ramon Rubén Blázquez

Provincial Deputy of Santiago del Estero
- In office 10 December 2017 – 10 December 2019

Minister of Government of Santiago del Estero
- In office 10 December 2013 – 9 December 2017
- Governor: Claudia Ledesma Abdala
- Preceded by: Marcos Escajadillo
- Succeeded by: José Emilio Neder

Personal details
- Born: 20 March 1970 (age 56) Brea Pozo, Argentina
- Party: Justicialist Party; Civic Front for Santiago

Carlos Roger Silva Neder (born 20 March 1970) is an Argentine lawyer and politician who serves as vice governor of Santiago del Estero Province.

== Early and personal life ==
Neder was born on 20 March 1970 in Brea Pozo, Santiago del Estero Province. He is a member of the an important political family in Santiago del Estero: José Emilio Neder, national senator and former vice governor, is his uncle. Neder's aunt, Estela Neder, is a congresswoman who has served in provincial government positions.

== Political career ==
A member of the Justicialist Party, in 2005 Neder joined the political project of the Civic Front for Santiago, led by Gerardo Zamora. From 2005 to 2013, he served as undersecretary of government during Zamora's first two terms as governor. He subsequently served as minister of government under Claudia Ledesma Abdala. In 2017, he was elected as a provincial deputy and was later appointed by his fellow legislators as provisional president of the provincial chamber of deputies.

In December 2019, following the resignation of José Emilio Neder as vice governor of the province, Silva was included on a shortlist of three provincial deputies nominated to fill the vacancy. After being elected by his fellow deputies, Silva was sworn in as vice governor of Santiago del Estero on 10 December 2019, serving the remainder of José Neder's term.

In 2021, he was elected vice governor again, this time by popular vote. Running alongside Gerardo Zamora, the ticket won 63.17% of the vote. Both took office on 10 December of that year for a four-year term.

Political offices
Preceded by José Emilio Neder	Vice Governor of Santiago del Estero; 2019–present	Incumbent
