= Carlos Juárez (politician) =

Argentine politician (1916–2010)

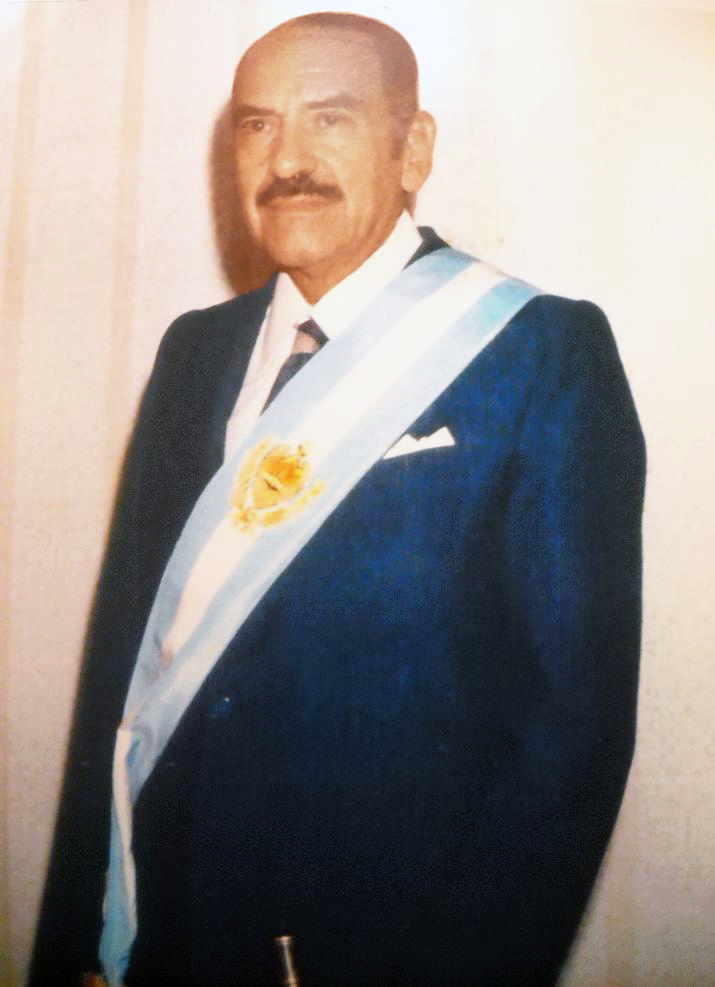
Carlos Arturo Juárez

Carlos Arturo Juárez (8 February 1916 – 3 July 2010) was an Argentine politician, Justicialist Party governor or ruler by proxy of Santiago del Estero Province over a 55-year period, leading to his description as a caudillo.

== Early life and governmental career ==
Carlos Arturo Juárez was born in La Banda on 8 February 1916. He was first elected governor in 1948 during the presidency of Juan Perón, and served from 1949 to 1952, and from 1973 to 1976. Juárez was re-elected governor in 1983 following the restoration of democracy, and served three terms: 1983–1987, 1995–1998, and 1999–2001.

Juárez's wife, Mercedes Aragonés de Juárez, was a minister in his administration and became governor herself in 2002, serving until federal intervention removed her in 2004. Her removal came after allegations of involvement in corruption and murder. Aragonés had named her husband Justice Minister in an attempt to grant him immunity.

== Murder investigation ==
In February 2003, a key investigation was launched into the murders of two young women, Leyla Nazar and Patricia Villalba. There were allegations that relatives of local political leaders were involved in the killings and other acts of violence, protected by Juárez. Former provincial intelligence chief Antonio Musa Azar was imprisoned, and his testimony implicated the Juárez family in connection with a number of crimes. In October 2003, investigators produced a report documenting more than 500 complaints of illegal acts and human rights violations, even against children as young as nine years old.

The report unleashed a further wave of accusations. Officials found files on around 40,000 political figures and others who were spied on and persecuted by the police and the local intelligence service. The couple were accused of involvement in the death of bishop Gerardo Sueldo (a critic of the Juárez regime), who died allegedly by accident in a car crash in 1998. The family of former governor César Iturre (1987–1991), who had been a Juárez ally but who later became opposed to Juarez, also accused the duo of involvement in his death in Paraguay.

== Arrest ==
Aragonés and Juárez were placed under house arrest. She was charged with fiscal fraud and the murder of Iturre. He was charged with involvement in the disappearance of a national deputy in 1976. The Juárez hegemony over Santiago del Estero ended. Nevertheless, it was suggested that they helped the Radical Civic Union win the governorship of the Santiago del Estero Province for the first time in 2003, with Gerardo Zamora as the UCR candidate, and had also backed president Néstor Kirchner's bid for re-election in 2007.

| Preceded by | Governor of Santiago del Estero; 1949–1952 | Succeeded by |
| Preceded by | Governor of Santiago del Estero; 1973–1976 | Succeeded by |
| Preceded by | Governor of Santiago del Estero; 1983–1987 | Succeeded by César Iturre |
| Preceded by Juan Schiaretti | Governor of Santiago del Estero; 1995–2001 | Succeeded by Carlos Díaz |
