= Claudia Ledesma Abdala =

Argentine politician

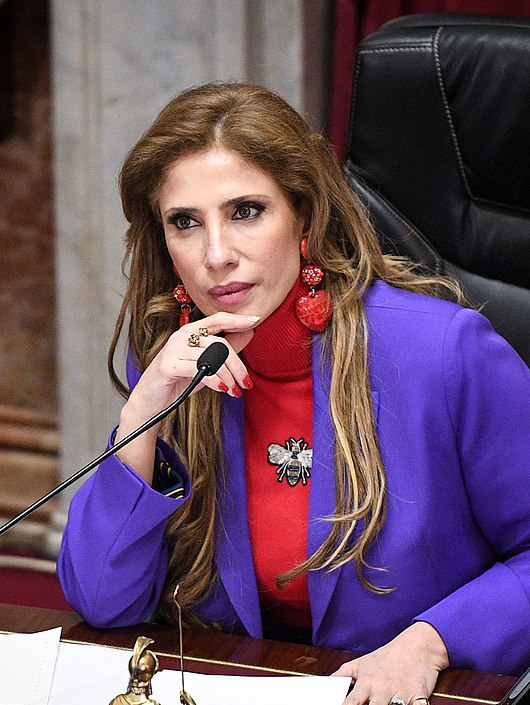

National Senator
- In office 10 December 2019 – 10 December 2025
- Constituency: Santiago del Estero

Provisional President of the Senate
- In office 10 December 2019 – 10 December 2023
- Preceded by: Federico Pinedo
- Succeeded by: Bartolomé Abdala

Governor of Santiago del Estero
- In office 10 December 2013 – 10 December 2017
- Vice Governor: José Emilio Neder
- Preceded by: Gerardo Zamora
- Succeeded by: Gerardo Zamora

National Deputy
- In office 10 December 2017 – 10 December 2019
- Constituency: Santiago del Estero

First Lady of Santiago del Estero
- Incumbent
- Assumed role 10 December 2017
- Governor: Gerardo Zamora
- Preceded by: Gerardo Zamora (as First Gentleman)
- In role 23 March 2005 – 10 December 2013
- Governor: Gerardo Zamora
- Preceded by: Carlos Juárez (as First Gentleman, 2004)
- Succeeded by: Gerardo Zamora (as First Gentleman)

Personal details
- Born: September 14, 1974 (age 52) La Banda, Santiago del Estero Province, Argentina
- Party: Justicialist Party
- Other political affiliations: Civic Front for Santiago; Frente de Todos
- Spouse: Gerardo Zamora
- Education: Catholic University of Santiago del Estero
- Profession: Lawyer and notary

Claudia Alejandra Ledesma Abdala de Zamora (born 14 September 1974) is an Argentine politician. A member of the local Civic Front for Santiago, Ledesma Abdala was governor of Santiago del Estero from 2013 to 2017, succeeding and preceding her husband, Gerardo Zamora.

From 2019 to 2025, she served as a National Senator for Santiago del Estero Province and as Provisional President of the Argentine Senate from 2019 to 2025.

== Early life and education ==
Ledesma was born in La Banda. Her father, Oscar Ledesma, was active in local politics as a supporter of Governor Carlos Juárez. She graduated as a lawyer and notary from the Catholic University of Santiago del Estero. Her maternal grandfather, Ricardo "Pololo" Abdala, was a physician and a prominent Radical Civic Union leader in the province as well.

== Political career ==
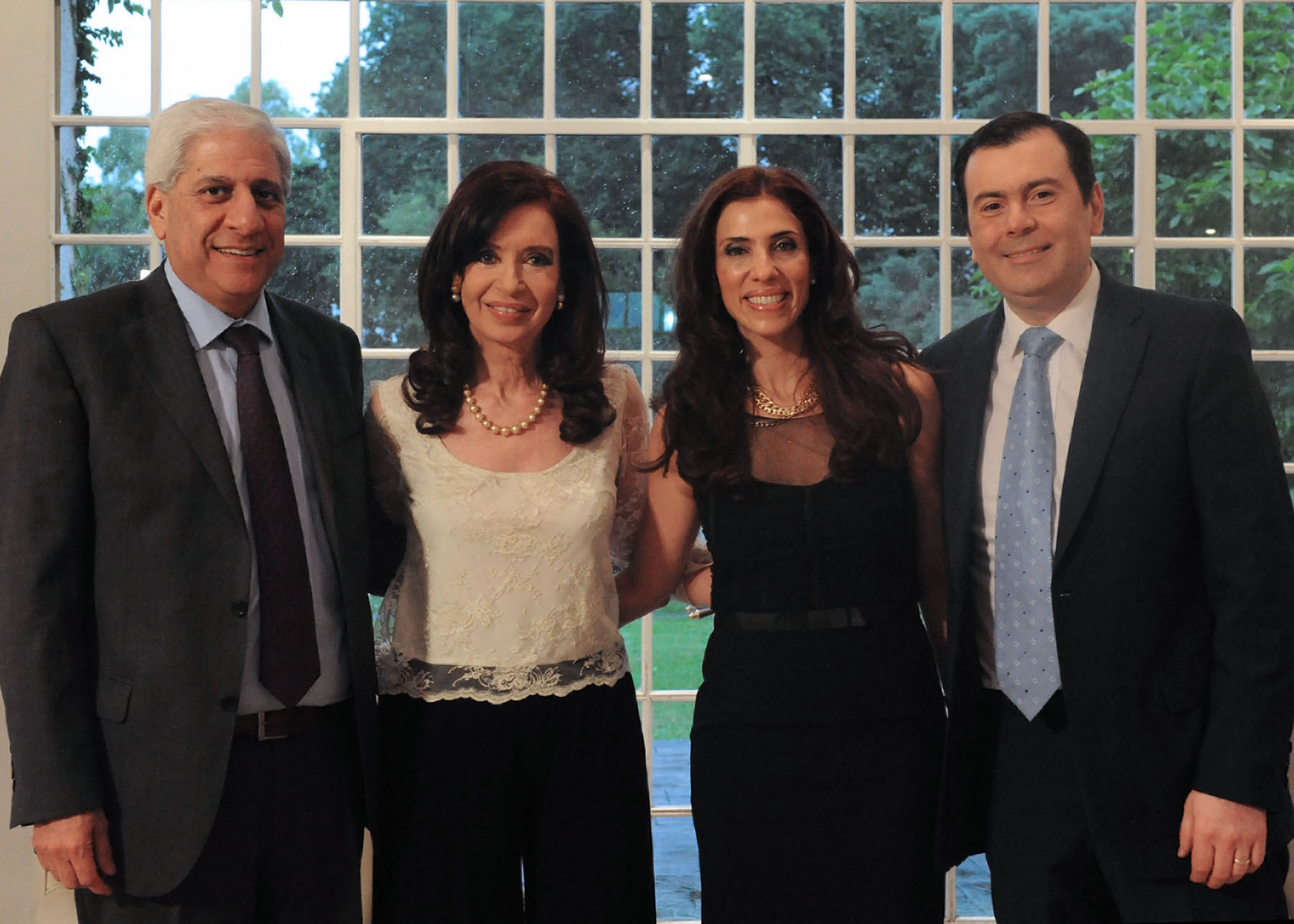
Vice Governor José Neder, then President Cristina Fernández de Kirchner, Governor Claudia Ledesma Abdala, and her husband and predecessor Gerardo Zamora shortly after Ledesma's election in 2013.

Ledesma entered public service in 2003 when she was elected Citizen Ombudsman for La Banda on the UCR ticket, and in 2005 she was appointed local infractions judge. Ledesma and her first husband, Jorge Amerio, were divorced, and in 2005 she met her future husband, Governor Gerardo Zamora. She was later appointed by her husband as Director of the Provincial Motor Vehicle Registry. The couple had two sons and a daughter.

=== Governor of Santiago del Estero ===
Governor Zamora nominated his wife for the governor's race held in 2013, while he himself ran for Senator. Both won their respective races on the Civic Front for Santiago ticket, and Ledesma was elected governor with nearly 65% of the vote.

Zamora had presided over an ambitious public works agenda in historically underdeveloped Santiago del Estero, 90% of whose US$1.8 billion budget was financed by the federal government in 2013. Ledesma continued this policy and initiated or inaugurated numerous significant projects as governor. These included among others a new building for the Provincial Legislature; the Juan Felipe Ibarra provincial office building (the first LEED certified government building in Argentina); increases in the educational budget for 1,100 new teachers and 10,000 new desks; and improvements in sewer systems and other public services.

Some of the most notable health and social care improvements during her tenure include expansion works in 14 hospitals and a new, 150,000 ft² hospital in La Banda; a driver safety education and enforcement program that led to a 40% reduction in motor vehicle accidents; a new child nutrition program that provides probiotic yogurt to over 47,000 poor children; and housing programs that included public housing, as well as the promotion of both cooperative housing and of self-building programs that financed over 3,000 such homes in 2015.

Mrs. Zamora's term ended on 10 December 2017. She was succeeded by his husband, who ran for a third term and won.

=== Provisional president of the Senate ===
Zamora ran for a seat in the National Senate at the 2019 elections on the Civic Front for Santiago ticket. She won with 56.96% of the vote, and took office on 10 December 2019. On that same day, she was sworn in as the provisional president of the Senate, succeeding Federico Pinedo.

== Electoral history ==
=== Executive ===
Electoral history of Claudia Ledesma Abdala
Election	Office	List	Votes			Result	Ref.
Election	Office	List	Total	%	P.	Result	Ref.
2013	Governor of Santiago del Estero	Civic Front for Santiago	300,196	64.67%	1st	Elected	

=== Legislative ===
Electoral history of Claudia Ledesma Abdala
Election	Office	List	#	District	Votes			Result	Ref.
Election	Office	List	#	District	Total	%	P.	Result	Ref.
2017	National Deputy	Civic Front for Santiago	1	Santiago del Estero Province	384,125	70.09%	1st (Note: Presented on an electoral list. The data shown represents the share of the vote the entire party/alliance received in that constituency.)	Elected	
2019	National Senator	Civic Front for Santiago	1	Santiago del Estero Province	328,627	56.96%	1st	Elected	

Political offices
Preceded by Gerardo Zamora	Governor of Santiago del Estero; 2013–2017	Succeeded by Gerardo Zamora
Preceded by Federico Pinedo	Provisional President of the Senate; 2019–2023	Succeeded by Bartolomé Abdala
