= Loreto, Santiago del Estero =

Loreto
- City
- Flag

- Location of Loreto in Argentina
- Coordinates: 28°18′S 64°12′W
- Country: Argentina
- Province: Santiago del Estero
- Department: Loreto

Population (2001 census)
  - Total: 9,854
- Time zone: UTC−3 (ART)
- CPA base: G4208
- Dialing code: +54 3845
- Climate: BSh

Loreto is a city located in central Argentina in the southwest of the province of Santiago del Estero, Argentina. It has 9,854 inhabitants as per the 2001 census [INDEC], and is the head town of the Loreto Department. It is located 59 km south of the provincial capital Santiago del Estero, on National Route 9.

== Population ==
Loreto had 9854 inhabitants (INDEC, 2001), representing an increase of 33.4% compared to the 7386 inhabitants (INDEC, 1991) of the previous census. This figure makes it the 8th largest urban area in the province.

== Economy ==
Its main economic activities are livestock raring, agriculture and forestry.

== Geography ==
- Altitude: 140 meters.
- Latitude: 28° 18′ 00″ S
- Longitude: 64° 12′ 00″ O

== Culture ==
Loreto is basically characterized by its ancient traditions, such as celebrations of the Virgin of Loreto, patroness of Argentine aviation and for edible craft products such as the Rosquete (a sweet dough in the form of a doughnut topped with meringue) which has a delicious flavor. Loreto features different sports institutions like the Union Workers Club, Sportivo Loreto, El Remanso, San Martin and, Alberdi.

== Celebrations ==
- On December 10, the popular patron saint festivities are celebrated in commemoration of its patron saint the Virgin of Loreto.
- It is the National Capital of Rosquete and home to the Rosquete Festival in February.
