= Catholic University of Santiago del Estero =

Coordinates: 27°47′25″S 64°14′38″W

Universidad Católica de Santiago del Estero
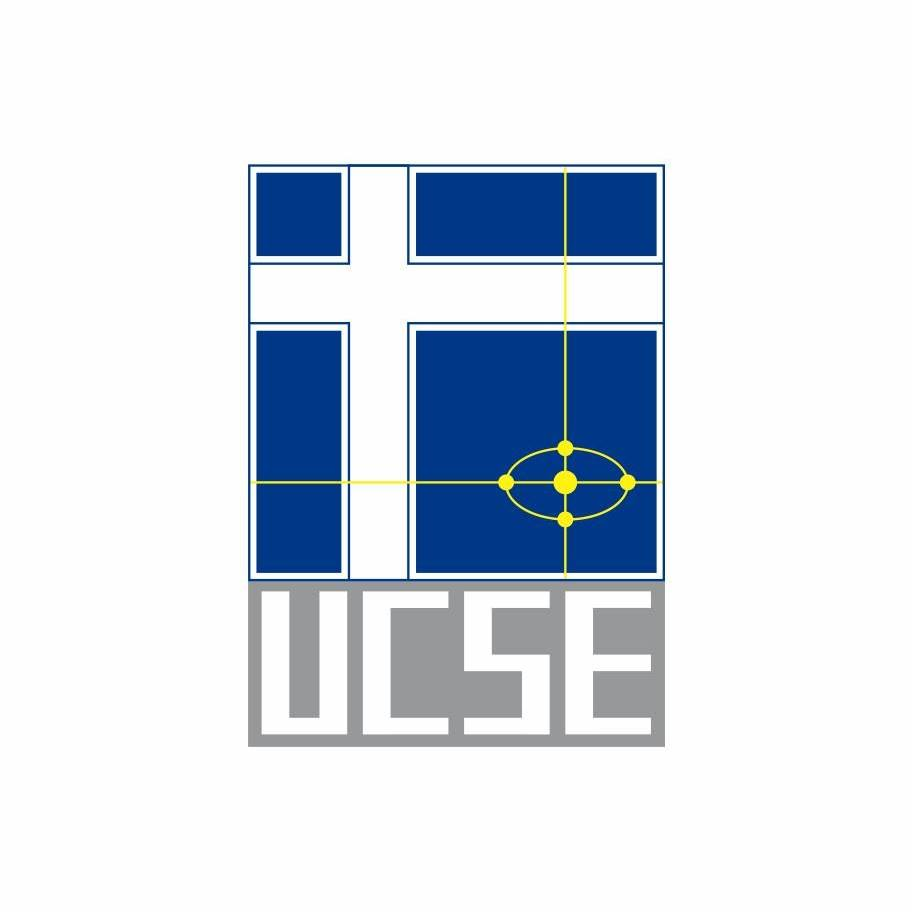
- Students: 6,569
- Website: ucse.edu.ar

The Catholic University of Santiago del Estero (UCSE) is an institution created by a group of lay Catholics in collaboration with the Congregation of the Brothers of Mercy of Our Lady of Perpetual Help, and was inaugurated on June 21, 1960, as the Instituto Universitario San José de Ciencias Políticas, Sociales y Económicas.

Its main campus was built in 1979, and the institution maintains campuses in San Salvador de Jujuy (1993), Olivos (1994), and Rafaela (1997). The campus is known for its arboretum, which is called the Estación Experimental Fernández and has a variety of trees, both indigenous and exotic. Among these trees are jacarandas, silk floss trees, tipas, pau d'arco, prosopis, and casuarinas, and a number of others.
