= Governor of Santiago del Estero =

Governor of Santiago del Estero Province
- Provincial coat of Arms

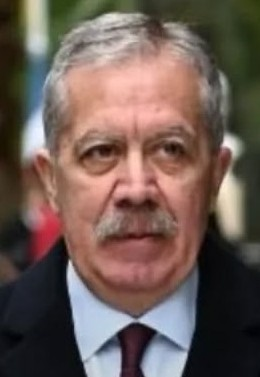
- Incumbent; Elías Suárez since 10 December 2025
- Appointer: Direct popular vote
- Term length: 4 years
- Inaugural holder: Juan Felipe Ibarra

The Governor of Santiago del Estero (Spanish: Gobernador de la Provincia de Santiago del Estero) is a citizen of the Santiago del Estero Province, in Argentina, holding the office of governor for the corresponding period. The governor is elected alongside a vice-governor. Currently the governor of Santiago del Estero is Elías Suárez.

== Governors since 1983 ==
Governor	Term in office	Party	Election	Vice Governor
Carlos Juárez	10 December 1983 – 10 December 1987	PJ	1983	—N/a
César Iturre	10 December 1987 – 10 December 1991	PJ	1987	Manuel Hipólito Herrera
Carlos Aldo Mujica	10 December 1991 – 27 October 1993	PJ	1991	Fernando Martín Lobo
Fernando Martín Lobo	27 October 1993 – 16 December 1993	PJ	1991	Vacant
Juan Schiaretti (Federal Interventor)	16 December 1993 – 6 July 1995	PJ	—N/a	Vacant
Carlos Juárez	6 July 1995 – 15 December 2001	PJ	1995	Luis María Peña
Carlos Juárez	6 July 1995 – 15 December 2001	PJ	1995	Juan Rodrigo
Carlos Juárez	6 July 1995 – 15 December 2001	PJ	1995	Darío Moreno
Carlos Juárez	6 July 1995 – 15 December 2001	PJ	1999	Mercedes Aragonés
Carlos Ricardo Díaz	15 December 2001 – 25 November 2002	PJ	—N/a	Vacant
Carlos Ricardo Díaz	15 December 2001 – 25 November 2002	PJ	2002	Mercedes Aragonés
Darío Moreno	25 November 2002 – 12 December 2002	PJ	2002	Mercedes Aragonés
Mercedes Aragonés	12 December 2002 – 1 April 2004	PJ	2002	Darío Moreno
Mercedes Aragonés	12 December 2002 – 1 April 2004	PJ	2002	Joaquín Botta
Pablo Lanusse (Federal Interventor)	1 April 2004 – 23 March 2005	PJ	—N/a	Vacant
Gerardo Zamora	23 March 2005 – 10 December 2013	UCR	2005	Emilio Rached
Gerardo Zamora	23 March 2005 – 10 December 2013	UCR	2005	Blanca Porcel
Gerardo Zamora	23 March 2005 – 10 December 2013	UCR	2008	Ángel Niccolai
Claudia Ledesma Abdala	10 December 2013 – 10 December 2017	FCpS	2013	José Emilio Neder
Gerardo Zamora	10 December 2017 – 10 December 2025	FCpS	2017	Carlos Silva Neder
Gerardo Zamora	10 December 2017 – 10 December 2025	FCpS	2021	Carlos Silva Neder
Elías Suárez	10 December 2025 – incumbent	FCpS	2025	Carlos Silva Neder

== See also ==
- Chamber of Deputies of Santiago del Estero
