= Federal intervention =

Attribution of the federal government of Argentina

Federal intervention (Spanish: Intervención federal) is a power attributed to the federal government of Argentina, by which direct rule of a province is established in certain extreme cases. Intervention is declared by the President with the assent of the National Congress. Article 6 of the Argentine Constitution states:

The federal government intervenes in the territory of the provinces to guarantee the republican form of government or to repel foreign invasions, and upon request of its authorities created to sustain or re-establish them, if they have been deposed by sedition or by the invasion of another province.

Upon intervention, the branches of the provincial government are dissolved, and the federal government must appoint a new authority (called interventor) who will serve for a short term until the situation is normalized.

The most recent example of intervention took place in 2004, when President Néstor Kirchner applied it in the province of Santiago del Estero after a wave of grave accusations against governor Mercedes Aragonés de Juárez and her husband, the local caudillo Carlos Juárez.

== See also ==
- Direct rule
- Federal interventor of Córdoba
- President's rule (A similar procedure used in India)
- Federal execution (A similar procedure used in Germany)
  - Reichsexekution (Its equivalent in the Holy Roman Empire, German Empire, and Weimar Republic)
