= Gerardo Zamora =

Argentine politician

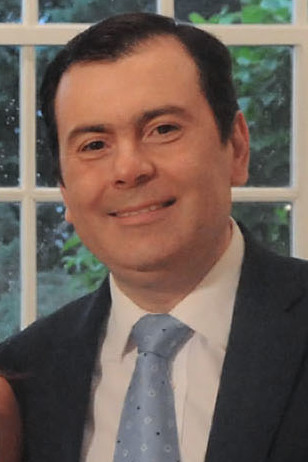

National Senator
- Incumbent
- Assumed office 10 December 2025
- Constituency: Santiago del Estero
- In office 4 December 2013 – 29 November 2017
- Constituency: Santiago del Estero

Governor of Santiago del Estero
- In office 10 December 2017 – 10 December 2025
- Vice Governor: José Emilio Neder; Carlos Silva Neder
- Preceded by: Claudia Ledesma Abdala
- Succeeded by: Elías Suárez
- In office 23 March 2005 – 10 December 2013
- Vice Governor: Emilio Rached; Blanca Porcel; Ángel Niccolai
- Preceded by: Pablo Lanusse
- Succeeded by: Claudia Ledesma Abdala

First Gentleman of Santiago del Estero
- In role 10 December 2013 – 10 December 2017
- Governor: Claudia Ledesma Abdala
- Preceded by: Claudia Ledesma Abdala (as First Lady)
- Succeeded by: Claudia Ledesma Abdala (as First Lady)

Provisional President of the Senate
- In office 28 February 2014 – 3 December 2015
- Preceded by: Beatriz Rojkés de Alperovich
- Succeeded by: Federico Pinedo

Mayor of Santiago del Estero
- In office 10 December 2001 – 10 December 2005
- Preceded by: José Luis Zavalía
- Succeeded by: Julio Alegre

Personal details
- Born: 6 January 1964 (age 62) Bowen, Mendoza Province, Argentina
- Party: UCR (1984–2010); Independent (2010–present)
- Other political affiliations: Civic Front for Santiago (2005–present)
- Spouse: Claudia Ledesma Abdala
- Education: Catholic University of Santiago del Estero
- Profession: Lawyer

Gerardo Zamora (born 6 January 1964) is an Argentine politician. He served twice as Governor of Santiago del Estero, first from 2005 to 2013 and then from 2017 to 2025. A dissident member of the centrist Radical Civic Union (UCR), he is the founder of the Civic Front for Santiago alliance.

Since 2025 he has been a National Senator for Santiago del Estero.

== Early life and education ==
Born in rural Bowen, Mendoza Province, Zamora's family moved to Santiago del Estero in 1968. He later became a leader in student politics, serving as President of the UCR student chapter Franja Morada at the Catholic University of Santiago del Estero and as President of the UCR's youth wing for two terms. He became a lawyer and continued his political activities.

== Political career ==
Elected to the Provincial Legislature in Santiago del Estero in 1991, he served in the post until 1993, and was elected Mayor of the city of Santiago del Estero in 1995. He became a provincial deputy once again in 1997 and served as President of the UCR caucus until 1999. In that year he was elected vice-mayor of Santiago del Estero and took over as Mayor in 2001 when the incumbent resigned. In 2003 he was elected Mayor of the city in his own right with 64% of the vote, serving until 2004.

Zamora has been a key UCR supporter of Peronist Presidents Néstor Kirchner and Cristina Fernández de Kirchner (a 'K' Radical, as UCR allies of Kirchnerism are known), and opposed leading UCR figures' plans to support an opposing candidate to the Kirchners in the 2007 presidential elections. He was elected governor in 2005 on the Civic Front for Santiago ticket, with the support of some Peronists and Socialists as well as most Radicals (UCR) in the province.

From 2005 until 2007, Zamora's vice-governor was Emilio Rached; Rached was elected to the Argentine Senate in 2007, and later broke ranks with the governor. Zamora was re-elected governor in 2008 with 85% of the vote. Governor Zamora sought an amendment to the provincial constitution that would enable a third consecutive term; the amendment was defeated in an October 22, 2013, Argentine Supreme Court ruling, however. His alliance with Kirchnerists had by then led to his break with the UCR, which opted to endorse former Vice Governor Emilio Rached in a Progressive, Civic and Social Front ticket for the upcoming 2013 gubernatorial elections. Zamora nominated his wife, Claudia Ledesma, as the Civic Front for Santiago candidate for governor and she defeated Rached by a 65-to-15% margin; the outgoing governor was concurrently elected to the Argentine Senate.

In 2013, his ex-vicegovernor, Emilio Rached, declared that Zamora acts like the "Mafia"

Supported by President Cristina Fernández de Kirchner in a bid to broaden her support among Radicales K, Zamora was elected Provisional President of the Argentine Senate with the support of Kirchner's majority Front for Victory caucus; he took office on 28 February 2014.

== Personal life ==
Zamora has married twice; he has one son from his first marriage, and two sons and a daughter from his second. His current and second wife, Claudia Ledesma Abdala, has served as Governor of Santiago del Estero and as provisional president of the Senate as well.

Political offices
Preceded by José Luis Zavalía	Mayor of Santiago del Estero; 2001–2005	Succeeded by Julio Alegre
Preceded by Pablo Lanusse	Governor of Santiago del Estero; 2005–2013	Succeeded by Claudia Ledesma Abdala
Preceded by Beatriz Rojkés de Alperovich	Provisional President of the Argentine Senate; 2014–2015	Succeeded by Federico Pinedo
Preceded by Claudia Ledesma Abdala	Governor of Santiago del Estero; 2017–2025	Succeeded by Elías Suárez
