= Civic Front for Santiago =

Civic Front for Santiago Frente Cívico por Santiago
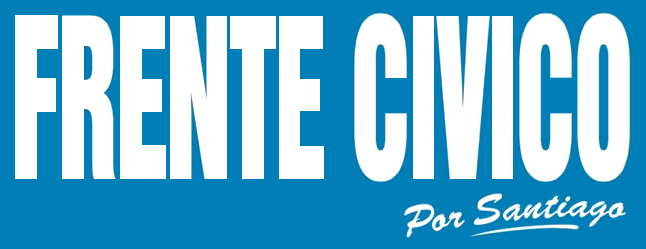
- President: Gerardo Zamora
- Founded: 2005
- Headquarters: Santiago del Estero, Argentina
- Ideology: Peronism; Factions: Kirchnerism; Radicalism; Social democracy
- Political position: Centre-left
- Argentine Chamber of Deputies (Santiago del Estero seats): 7 / 7
- Argentine Senate (Santiago del Estero seats): 2 / 3
- Seats in the Santiago del Estero Legislature: 16 / 40

The Civic Front for Santiago (Spanish: Frente Cívico por Santiago) is a Peronist provincial political coalition in Santiago del Estero Province, Argentina. It operates as part of Frente de Todos.

The Civic Front is effectively a coalition of members of both the Radical Civic Union (UCR) and the Justicialist Party with some socialists. Most of those under the Civic Front banner are supporters of the Front for Victory of President Cristina Fernández de Kirchner and Néstor Kirchner.

At the legislative elections of 23 October 2005, the party won three of the 127 elected deputies (out of 257). The province's governor, Gerardo Zamora (UCR) was elected on the Civic Front ticket at the same election. In 2007, the Front won all four positions for national deputy in the Province and two out of three senators.
