= Beatriz Rojkés de Alperovich =

Argentine speech therapist, businesswoman and politician (born 1956)

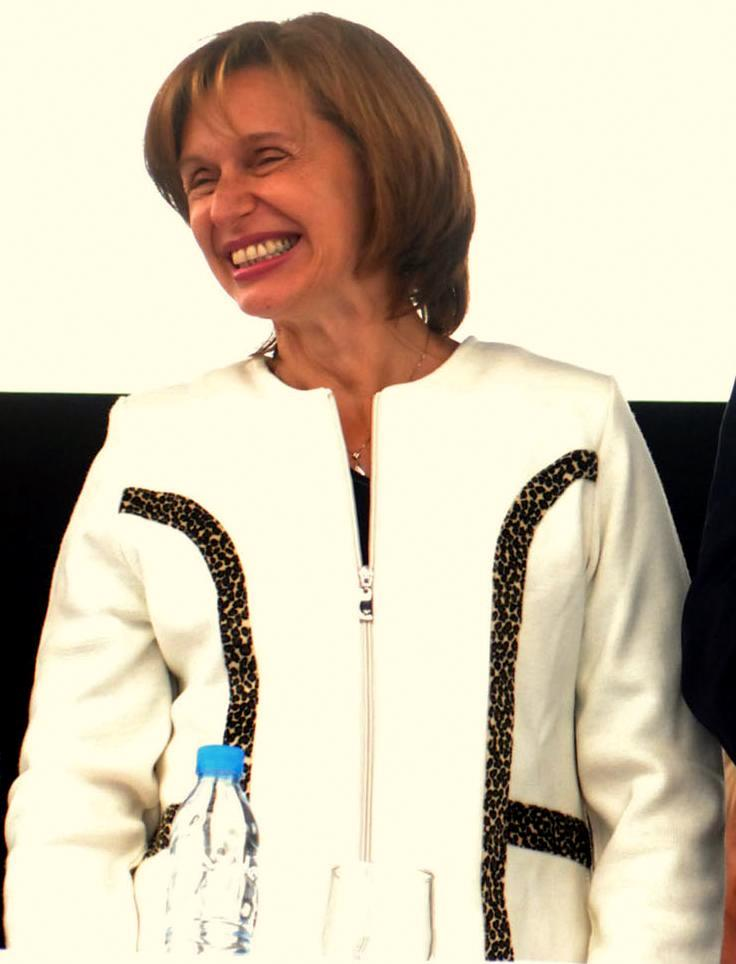

National Senator
- In office 10 December 2009 – 10 December 2015
- Constituency: Tucumán

Provisional President of the Senate
- In office November 30, 2011 – February 28, 2014
- Preceded by: José Pampuro
- Succeeded by: Gerardo Zamora

National Deputy
- In office 10 December 2005 – 10 December 2009
- Constituency: Tucumán

Personal details
- Born: Beatriz Liliana Rojkés; February 4, 1956 (age 70) San Miguel de Tucumán
- Party: Justicialist Party/Front for Victory
- Spouse: José Alperovich
- Profession: Psychopedadogue; Auto dealership proprietor

Beatriz Liliana Rojkés de Alperovich (born February 4, 1956) is an Argentine speech therapist, businesswoman, and Justicialist Party politician. She was elected to the Argentine Senate in 2009, and in 2011 became the first woman and first Jew to be designated as its Provisional President; the post put her second in Argentine line of succession, after Vice President Amado Boudou.

Both Rojkés and her husband, José Alperovich, who has been governor of Tucumán since 2003, are considered leading “K” (or Kirchner) politicians who are “very close to the Casa Rosada.” Their lavish way of life has been severely criticized, as has the fact that several of their relatives have been given high-level government jobs. Both of them have been the subject of corruption allegations. Also, Rojkés has frequently made remarks that have been viewed in the media as insensitive to the poor and to crime victims. In 2015, she visited flood victims in the town of El Molino and made headlines when she called one of them a “lazy bum” and boasted of having ten mansions.

== Early life and education ==
Beatriz Liliana Rojkés was born in San Miguel de Tucumán to Luisa Werblud and Salomón Rojkés, both Ashkenazi Jews who emigrated from Europe. Salomón Rojkés inaugurated a textile mill in the city, Textil Americana. She earned a degree in Psychopedagogy and married a fellow member of Tucumán's Jewish community, José Alperovich, with whom she had four children.

== Career ==
She became a partner in her father-in-law's auto dealership, León Alperovich de Tucumán S.A., in 1997, and by 2010 controlled 98% of the firm (one of Tucumán's largest Ford and Volkswagen distributors). Following the election of her husband as Governor of Tucumán, she was elected in 2005 to the Argentine Chamber of Deputies on the Front for Victory ticket (the majority, center-left Justicialist Party faction then headed by President Néstor Kirchner). She introduced numerous bills advancing children's rights, women's rights and nutrition, among other issues.

She was elected to the Senate in 2009. Her stake in the Rojkés and Alperovich family businesses made her the wealthiest woman in the Senate by 2010, and the fourth-wealthiest overall. She was named to the Senate committees on Constitutional Affairs, Labor, Health, Ombudsmanship, and Bermejo River works.

In early 2010, the opposition was able to transfer Rojkés de Alperovich's position on the Congressional Bicameral Committee to an opposition politician, Luis Juez. The government protested. On April 29, 2010, the Appeals Court confirmed Rojkés's reinstatement on the committee. She said that “We will be able to work normally from now on.”

Rojkés was elected Provisional President of the Senate on November 30, 2011. Married to one of the few Jews in Argentina to be elected governor, she herself made history by becoming both the first Jew and the first woman to hold this key post. Rojkés promised the President her “loyalty.” In a radio interview, Rojkés de Alperovich said that she “fully supports the political system” of the Kirchner government and that she was “proud” to have been selected for the position. The Provisional President of the Senate is second in the line of succession to the Presidency in Argentina.

Speculation mounted in the days leading to the second inaugural of President Cristina Fernández de Kirchner that Senator Alperovich might be asked to administer the Oath of Office in lieu of Vice President Julio Cobos, who had been distanced from the rest of the administration since his surprise tie-breaking vote in 2008 against an export tax increase supported by the president. President Fernández de Kirchner ultimately opted to take the oath independently, as did Vice President Amado Boudou.

In June 2013, Cristina Kirchner criticized opposition politicians for failing to come up with new ideas so as to make possible “a healthy democratic debate.” When she made the remarks, she was flanked by Alperovich and Rojkés, whom the Buenos Aires Herald described as “two staunch supporters of her administration.” In February 2014, it was announced that Rojkés de Alperovich would be replaced as provisional leader of the Senate by Gerardo Zamora.

== Controversies ==
At a public event in March 2006, Rojkés condemned the writer and journalist Tomás Eloy Martínez, calling him a former Tucumáno – effectively disowning him as a resident of the province – because he had published an article in La Nación about the high level of poverty in the province.

She was criticized in November 2011 by a political opponent, Senator Jose Cano, for saying that there were no street urchins in the province of Tucumán. Cano said that her remark gave him the feeling that “she lives in another province.”

Rojkés caused controversy in 2012 by commenting on the brutal murder of a six-year-old girl, Mercedes Figueroa, saying that her parents were “drunks” who had not cared for her properly and that as First Lady she could not associate herself with such people. She later apologized for the remarks.

=== Marita Verón case ===
The disappearance of a young woman named Marita Verón in Tucumán became a public issue and was held up as an example of the extent of human smuggling in the province. Suspects went on trial but were acquitted on December 12, 2012, in a verdict widely seen as exemplary of the corruption of courts in the province and the collusion of judges with gangsters. Rojkés said that she was “shocked” and “surprised” by the court's decision to free all of the defendants, but also, in what became a very controversial statement, added that prostitution and human trafficking “exists and will continue to exist.”

=== El Molino incident ===
In March 2015, Rojkés visited the southern town of El Molino, which had recently experienced serious flooding. In response to local residents who had been affected by the flooding and who were angry at delays in government assistance, she told them, “Don’t get angry, because you will make the whole world go crazy and you won’t solve anything.” She added, “We are listening, but it’s not my fault if the river floods.” This statement caused outrage among the locals, and led to a heated discussion. When one flood victim was particularly critical of the government's response and of her attitude, she responded dismissively. This led to a heated argument between the two in which she called the man a "bum" and he called her a "crook". During the argument she called out that she owned ten mansions.

Her remarks were caught on video and quickly went viral. Rojkés later denied that she actually had ten houses. On March 23, 2015, she called the incident a set-up and said that she “fell for it in the worst way.” She added: “I reacted like an idiot” and attributed her reaction to “a mix of pain, impotence, of being unable to provide a solution. It made me lose my temper.” The flood victim told a television reporter “that he was only trying to get the provincial government to send machinery that could help prevent floods in the future.” Rojkés apologized for her remarks to the man, while Cabinet Chief Aníbal Fernández accused the man of provoking her.

Radical Civic Union (UCR) gubernatorial candidate José Manuel Cano criticized Rojkés for her remarks in El Molino, saying “she belonged to a caste of political leaders who believe they are superior to everyday citizens” and noting that she had “a long history of outbursts.” For example, she had “drunkenly called the family of the assassinated girl (six-year-old Mercedes Figueroa), she threatened the doctors that protested in favour of higher salaries and questioned mothers that take drugs for not taking care of their children.”

In a March 25, 2015, commentary headlined “Adding insult to injury,” the editors of the Buenos Aires Herald condemned Rojkés de Alperovich for the remarks she made to the flood victims. “Throwing in the face of somebody who has just lost his home her possession of 10 mansions (in any case a false claim, according to her) is so obviously wrong that it becomes hardly necessary to elaborate,” they stated. “This is not the first evidence of an authoritarian regime in the province governed by her husband for the last 12 years – remember that by far the bloodiest repression of the late 2013 looting occurred in Tucumán. The latest Rojkés gaffe thus largely serves to suggest that this is an authoritarian style where the sticks are much longer than the carrots.”

In an April 2015 commentary for La Nación, Fernando Bracaccini and Renzo Lavin suggested that the incident in El Molino underscored the lack of accountability for public officials under the Kirchner government. They noted that Rojkés had not made public any information about her income or fortune since 2009, and that there was no way to know how many houses she owned. A 2013 federal law, they explained, enabled public officials to avoid disclosing their private financial or property information by putting it in the names of their spouses or children, and under provincial legislation her husband, even though serving as governor of Tucumán, was not required to disclose such data.

=== Alleged Nepotism ===
A July 2012 article in La Nación held up the province of Tucumán, and particularly the relatives of Rojkés and Alperovich, as “a crude example” of nepotism in government and the enrichment of Kirchner-connected families with government funds. At the time the article was published, Rojkés's sister Silvia Rojkés Temkin was the provincial Minister of Education, her brother Carlos Rojkés was an officer in the national Senate, her niece Veronica Rojkés was a member of the National Congress, and her brother was a supplier to the province of Tucumán state. Also, Paul Zeitume, Alperovich's son, was Director of Commerce for Tucumán province; Isaac Bromberg, an Alperovich cousin, was a national deputy; another cousin, Beatriz Mirkin, was a former Minister of Social Development and a current national deputy; Oscar Mirkin, yet another cousin, was Secretary of Public Works in Tucumán; and Lucia Temkin, niece of Alperovich's private secretary, was provisional president of the national Senate.

=== Corruption allegations ===
In November 2014, Rojkés was criticized by opposition leaders for claiming that there had been “no corruption” in Tucumán during her husband's term as governor. Opposition politician Manuel Avellaneda said that she must have a “very poor memory,” given the number of allegations of corruption that had been made against her husband, his efforts to control the judiciary, and his refusal to take action for greater transparency. Avellaneda said that according to Enrique Romero, Alperovich's administration is the “most corrupt in history.” Avellaneda stated that “as in dictatorships, corruption is the soul of the government of her husband, which is the most corrupt in the democratic history of Tucumán.”
