= Jaime Durán Barba =

Ecuadorian political consultant

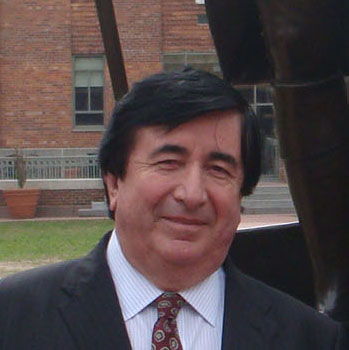
- Born: December 5, 1947 (age 78)
- Occupation: Political consultant

Jaime Rolando Durán Barba (born December 5, 1947) is an Ecuadorian political consultant.

== Career ==
He formed his political consulting firm Informe confidencial (Confidential report) in the late 1970s. He studied sociology under the guidance of Manuel Mora y Araujo.

From 1998 to 2000, he was Secretary of Public Administration in Ecuador under the presidency of Jamil Mahuad, who months later was dismissed from his duties in January 2000 and is currently a fugitive from justice in his country for embezzlement.

He has advised Mexican president Felipe Calderón and Ecuadorian politician Álvaro Noboa. Since 2005, he ran successive campaigns for Buenos Aires mayor Mauricio Macri.

In October 2011, the Front for Victory's attorney, Juan Manuel Olmos, denounced him before the federal electoral judge of Buenos Aires, María Servini, for an alleged electoral crime consisting of a covert campaign against the candidate of that front, Daniel Filmus. The campaign would have consisted of automatic telephone calls with a message falsely linking Filmus's father to Sergio Schoklender. In September 2012, the Supreme Court ruled that, due to a matter of competences, the case must be brought before the justice system of the City of Buenos Aires. Duran Barba and his associates were investigated and prosecuted in the case. Tag Continental, Connectic SRL and Opinión Confidencial, the company created at the end of 2008 by Rodrigo Lugones and Guillermo Garat, the two favorite students of the star consultant of the PRO, were searched for that investigation.

He published El Arte de Ganar ("The Art of Winning"), a book on the use of attacking strategies for political campaigns, in 2010. In his book, Durán Barba was singled out for promoting dirty campaigns and praised his own strategies by remembering in his tactics in a chapter of his book where he declared: "Sometimes, the attack of a politician was so brutal that his adversary psychologically annihilated, and even came to suicide."

In 2015, he was denounced before the National Electoral Directorate in a complaint for "defamation" against the candidate of the Frente para la Victoria; rival of Cambiemos that Mauricio Macri leads, whom he accuses of launching a "dirty campaign" by using social networks for photographs and false images to damage the image of Scioli. "The defamation campaign includes photos of catastrophes that occurred in Central American countries, editions of false images of Daniel Scioli and Karina Rabolini in paradisiacal places.

In 2017, Vice President Gabriela Michetti and counselor Jaime Durán Barba, among other officials, were criminally charged in the federal courts for mounting a network of official trolls financed with public funds from the Senate with the aim of intimidating opponents. According to the complaint, the vice president would have set up a network of pro-government tweeters, and to finance this device would have diverted at least 1.5 million pesos from the Senate. In the complaint, Eduardo Cura, ex-husband of the president of the Senate and director of the Canal Ciudad, and Paula Schuster, spokesperson for Michetti, were also included.

In 2018, in the Official Gazette on Monday, January 22, the allocation of 247 million pesos to 10 consultants was revealed to carry out 67 surveys in the next 6 months for the government of the City of Buenos Aires. As a result of them, a Buenos Aires newspaper revealed that two of these companies are closely linked to Jaime Durán Barba, Inversora Boroca SA and Green Consult SRL. Together, they received benefits for almost 71 million pesos from the government of Rodriguez Larreta. Parallelly according to the News Magazine that same month, between 2016 and 2017, Inversora Boroca SA billed the Buenos Aires Government directed by the PRO, around 7 million pesos. " The IGJ observed the papers presented for the capital increase and demanded the presentation of the balance owed.

It has a department in Recoleta, registered in the name of Trabulsi Management INC, a company created in 1999 in the British Virgin Islands - one of the largest tax havens on the planet, of which Durán Barba and his partner were directors and even had a general power of attorney to operate on his behalf when he settled in Panama.

Trabulsi Management INC has no offices or activity in Argentina, but was registered in the AFIP, according to official records, in November 2015, ten days before the triumph of Macri over Daniel Scioli in the presidential ballotage.

== Tax evasion ==
He is cited in the Pandora Papers in 2021.

== Political views ==
Durán Barba has expressed pro-choice views regarding the abortion debate. In an interview published by La Nación in November 2014, Durán Barba said, referring to Cambiemos: "We are in favor of freedom; [...] if a woman wants to have an abortion, let her have an abortion".
