= Carlos Magariños =

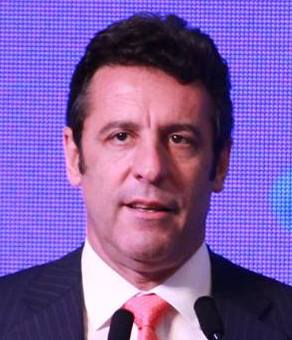

Ambassador of Argentina to Brazil
- In office December 2015 – July 2019
- Preceded by: Luis María Kreckler
- Succeeded by: Daniel Scioli

Director-General of the United Nations Industrial Development Organization
- In office December 1997 – December 2005
- Preceded by: Mauricio de Maria y Campos
- Succeeded by: Kandeh Yumkella

Secretary for Industry
- In office August 1993 – July 1996
- President: Carlos Menem
- Preceded by: Juan Schiaretti
- Succeeded by: Alieto Guadagni

Personal details
- Born: 16 August 1962 (age 64) Argentina
- Spouse: María Belén Di Paolo
- Occupation: diplomat and politician, academician and businessman
- Website: https://carlosmagarinos.com/en/

Carlos Alfredo Magariños (born August 16, 1962) is an Argentine politician, diplomat, academician and entrepreneur. He was twice elected director general of the United Nations Industrial Development Organization (UNIDO, 1997, 2001) by the international community, made up of 178 member states.

Prior to that he was national director for foreign trade (selected through an open public process); under-secretary for industry; secretary for industry of Argentina and secretary of state for mining and industry. He was also Economic and Trade Representative of Argentina in Washington D.C.

After his two terms at the helm of UNIDO he return to the academia (University of Oxford and Renmin University of China) and to the private sector, founding his own companies, dedicated to the early identification of business trends, facilitating business development and financial market access for industrial projects and companies.

Upon taken office in December 2015, the president of the Republic of Argentina, Mauricio Macri, appointed him Ambassador of Argentina to the Federate Republic of Brasil. The Honorable Senate of the Argentinean Nation lent its unanimous agreement in February of the following year.

He returned to Argentina in July 2019 to continue his career in the private sector, recruited by Spencer Stuart to lead the Argentine Chamber of Energy. Currently, he leads Global Foresight and is a board member of DirecTV Latin America.

In 2023 he became chairman of the Global Alliance of Small and Medium size enterprises (GASME, China-US) for a second time (having served in that position between 2010 and 2015). He is the chairman for Latin-America of the Indian Chamber of Commerce and member of the board of the World Agriculture Forum.

== Biography ==
Magariños earned a master's degree in business administration (1989) at the University of Buenos Aires. While studying was elected Academic Counselor by the Student Senate to represent it on the Board of the Faculty of Economic Sciences (FCE UBA), its governing body (1985–87).

He also studied at the International Development Law Institute (Rome, 1990) and specialized in mergers and acquisitions at Wharton Business School (University of Pennsylvania, 1997). His academic records includes positions as assistant of microeconomy (on practical works, 1986) and technical coordinator in research methodology in social science (1987) at University of Buenos Aires; assistant professor of foreign trade institutions (1989) at University of Belgrano, Argentina and associate professor for Argentine and Latin American economic issues (1989) as well as full professor of political economy (2009) at University of El Salvador, Argentina.

Most recently Carlos Magariños was selected senior associated member at St Antony's College, Oxford (2006) and senior fellow at Chongyang Institute for Financial Studies (RDCY), Renmin University of China (2013).

Magariños was selected (through an open public process) national director for foreign trade in 1991. He later became under-secretary of state for industry (1992–93). During the first term of President Carlos Menem, he became State Secretary for Industry of Argentina (in 1993, when he was 31 years old). His political "godfather" was Juan Schiaretti, who promoted him through the ranks of the economic team led by Domingo Cavallo. Towards the end of 1995 Magariños added responsibilities for mining to his portfolio and, in mid-1996, was appointed Economic and Trade Representative of Argentina in Washington, D.C., with the rank of ambassador and state secretary.

A year later Magariños´ candidacy was submitted for the position of director general of the United Nations Industrial Development Organization (UNIDO). He was recommended by the Industrial Development Board, with two-thirds of the votes becoming the first Argentinean and the youngest person ever (at 35) to lead a UN agency. He won over Dariusz Rosati, who was then the frontrunner for the post.

Following due process, in December 1997, UNIDO's General Conference elected him as director-general of the organization, which was undergoing a severe crisis at the time.

At the helm of UNIDO he implemented an ambitious reform program to improved efficiency and transparency at the organization and to update its technical cooperation program, modernizing the concept of industrial development and linking it with the fight against poverty and environmental degradation. Initial success of his reform efforts led Magariños to be elected for a second term, 2001–2005, defeating an African contender, Ablassé Ouedraogo

At the time, his colleagues at the UN (some of them in writing, like the Administrator of the United Nations Development Program Administrator Mark Malloch Brown) expressed their amazement for the speed and depth of UNIDO reforms. These reforms boosted the confidence of the member states in the organization, and UNIDO increased its total budget by 60% between 2000 and 2005. Voluntary contributions from donor countries also increased by 147% between 1998 and 2005 and renew confidence in the organization brought new Member States.

UNIDO's reform were highlighted at the UN System. Secretary General Kofi Annan nominated Carlos Magariños as the first chairman of the High Level Committee on Programs of the UN Chiefs Executive Board on Coordination (CEB), the body for high level coordination at the level of UN heads of agencies and programs. To held that position Magariños was endorsed by his colleagues. The merits of UNIDO's reform were also debated at the House of Commons, in the UK Parliament. The Department for International Development (DFID) ranked UNIDO highest among standard-setting agencies in its 2005 Multilateral Effectiveness Framework.

Over those years, under Magariños leadership, UNIDO developed a cooperation framework with the private sector through multinational companies (Fiat, BASF, Erickson, etc.). He pioneered the designed of dedicated programs for post-conflict situations (under the rational that the multilateral system was good at reorganizing political and judicial systems in these situations but less effective at economic reconstruction). UNIDO post-conflict programs for Afghanistan, Irak, Sudan and East Timor, for example, were developed in those years. Magariños also promoted trade capacity building programs, an area where UNIDO would excel, and pay special attention to the effects of China accession to the World Trade Organization.

Upon his return to Buenos Aires, Argentina, Magariños founded with his wife, Belen Di Paolo, a group of companies (Foresight 2020 and Global Business Development Network in 2007 and 2010, with offices in Argentina, Austria, India, Perú and USA) dedicated to the promotion of investments in biotechnology, renewable energies, carbon markets, informatics, telecommunications and agri-business. He sat on several boards of institutions and organizations in the US, Europe, Asia and Latin America, including University San Ignacio of Loyola, the Council on Energy, Environment and Water (CEEW), the Global Alliance of SMEs, the Bank of the Province of Buenos Aires (board member 2007–2011, appointed by Governor Daniel Scioli), the oldest bank of Argentina, and Circulo of Montevideo.

His interest in understanding the challenges confronting developing and emerging societies in a globalized economy led him to design and manage various research projects. The results obtained were presented in several articles and writings, among which his 8 books published (a couple of them translated to English and French) could be highlighted, as well as his numerous conferences and presentations around the world.

Magariños’ won 40 international awards in Europe, Asia and America for his performance as national leader, particularly in international affairs, including 5 titles Honoris Cause and several decorations and recognitions from governments and public entities.

He was always concerned about his country's progress, being active in public debates by publishing books and articles regularly in local media. He became Ambassador of Argentina to Brazil shortly after Mauricio Macri took office as President of Argentina (2015-2019), returning to public service 20 years after he left office at National Government.

A combination of personal and professional engagements (recruited by Spencer Stuart to lead the Argentinean Chamber of Energy) drove him back to Argentina in July 2019, to continue his career at the private sector. Currently he leads Global Foresight, a company designed to anticipate business trends (where he clustered the experience and background of the companies they developed in the past, Foresight 2020 and Global Business Development Network). He is a board member of Werthein Group, owner of the licenses for DirecTV Latin America, Sky Brazil and DirecTV GO.

== Books ==
- Magariños, Carlos A.; Werthein, Darío (2017). Llegar al Futuro. Porque las nuevas tecnologías y el conocimiento pueden revolucionar la Argentina [Reach to the Future. Why new technologies and knowledge can revolutionize Argentina]. Sudamericana. ISBN 978-950-07-5818-5.
- Magariños, Carlos A. (2013). Argentina 4.0 La Revolución Ciudadana. Prometeo. ISBN 978-987-574-608-4.
- Magariños, Carlos A. (2005). Towards a Common Agenda for Action. A Proposal in the Context of the Millennium Development Goals. UNIDO. ISBN 92-1-106431-7. Archived from the original on 2005-02-26.
- Magariños, Carlos A.; Sercovich, Francisco (2003). Updating and fleshing out the development agenda. Papers and Proceedings of the Venice II Meeting. UNIDO. ISBN 92-1-106424-4.
- Magariños, Carlos A.; Yongtu, Long; Sercovich, Francisco C. (2003). China in the WTO. Palgrave Macmillan. ISBN 0-333-99930-4.
- Magariños, Carlos A.; Sercovich, Francisco (2002). Gearing up for a new development agenda. Papers and Proceedings of the Meeting on Marginalization vs Prosperity: How to improve and spread the gains of globalization. UNIDO. ISBN 9789211064193.
- Magariños, Carlos A.; Assaf, George; Lall, Sanjaya; Martinussen, John D.; Ricupero, Rubens; Sercovich, Francisco (2001). Reforming the UN System: Unido's Need-Driven Model. Brill. ISBN 90-411-1669-9.
- Magariños, Carlos A. (1995). El rol del Estado y la política industrial en los ´90. Aportes preliminares para una discusión inconclusa (The role of the state and the industrial policy of the 1990s. Preliminar contributions for an unfinished discussion). Macchi. ISBN 950-537-321-X.

== Academic honors ==
- Honorary Professor. Wuchang University of Technology (WUT). Wuhan, Hubei, People´s Republic of China. (2023)
- Award for outstanding records in recognition for performance in National Politics, School of Economic Sciences, University of Buenos Aires. (2017, Res. (CD) Nro 4066/2017)
- Doctor Honoris Causa, University for Social and Business Sciences, Buenos Aires, Argentina (2001)
- Doctor Honoris Causa, University of Economic Sciences and Public Administration, Budapest, Hungary (2000)
- Doctor Honoris Causa, University San Ignacio of Loyola, Lima, Peru (2015)
- Honorary Doctor, National Technical University, Kyiv Polytechnic Institute, Ukraine (2002)
- Kennedy Cross, John F. Kennedy University. Buenos Aires, Argentina (2004)
- "Outstanding Personality", declared by the Institute of Public Managemente of Provincial University of Cordoba, Argentina (Abril 2018)
- Professor Honoris Causa, Lomonosov State University, Moscow, Russian Federation (1999)

== Decorations and other awards ==
- Distinguish Achievement Award, World Association of Former United Nations Interns and Fellows. New York, U.S.A. (2001)
- Distinguish Visitor of the City of Arequipa, Peru (2014)
- Foundation Prize (Prix de la Fondation) of the Universal Forum Fondation (Fondation du Forum Universale) Monaco. 2002
- Friendship Medal of the Cuban Government (2006)
- Grand Decoration of Honour in Silver with Sash of the Austrian Government (2006)
- Great Cross of the Anhanguera Merit Order. State of Goias, Brazil. (2017)
- Great Cross of the Colombian Order of San Carlos (2000)
- Great Cross of the Ecuatorian National Order of Merit (2005)
- Great Cross of the Guatemalan Order of Quetzal (2001)
- Great Cross of the Merit of Work Order. Brazilian Government. (2018)
- Great Official of the Italian Merit Order (2003)
- Honorary Citizen, Dallas City, U.S.A.¨(1997)
- Official of the Colombian Industrial Merit Order (2004)
- Peacemaker Medal of the Brazilian Army (2016)
- Performance Trophy of the year 2000, (Trophée des Performances del ánne 2000) Superior Institut of Management (Institut Supérieur de Gestion – ISG -) Paris, France.
- Priyadarshni Academy Global Award, Mumbai, India (2004)
- Prize Faculty of Economic Sciences (of the University of Buenos Aires - UBA) to the outstanding personal trajectory in recognition for performance in National Politics (2017, Resolution (CD) 4066/17)
