= List of Légion d'honneur recipients by name (U) =

The French government gives out the Legion of Honour awards, to both French and foreign nationals, based on a recipient's exemplary services rendered to France, or to the causes supported by France. This award is divided into five distinct categories (in ascending order), i.e. three ranks: Knight, Officer, Commander, and two titles: Grand Officer and Grand Cross. Knight is the most common and is awarded for either at least 20 years of public service or acts of military or civil bravery. The rest of the categories have a quota for the number of years of service in the category below before they can be awarded. The Officer rank requires a minimum of eight years as a Knight, and the Commander, the highest civilian category for a non-French citizen, requires a minimum of five years as an Officer. The Grand Officer and the Grand Cross are awarded only to French citizens, and each requires three years' service in their respective immediately lower rank. The awards are traditionally published and promoted on 14 July.

The following is a non-exhaustive list of recipients of the Legion of Honour awards, since the first ceremony in May 1803. 2,550 individuals can be awarded the insignia every year. The total number of awards is close to 1 million (estimated at 900,000 in 2021, including over 3,000 Grand Cross recipients), with some 92,000 recipients alive today. Only until 2008 was gender parity achieved amongst the yearly list of recipients, with the total number of women recipients since the award's establishment being only 59 at the end of the second French empire and only 26,000 in 2021.

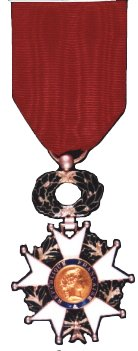

Recipient	Dates (birth – death)	General work & reason for the recognition	Award category (date)
Samuel Umtiti	1993 – Present	French professional footballer (La Liga club Barcelona / France national football team)	Knight (2018)
Józef Unrug	1884 – 1973	Polish admiral. Known for helping reestablish Poland's navy after World War I.	Knight (TBA); Officer (TBA); Commander (TBA); Grand Officer (TBA); Grand Cross (TBA)
Luis Ureta Sáenz Peña	1944 – Present	Argentine businessman and diplomat	Knight (TBA); Officer (TBA)
Arturo Uslar Pietri	1906 – 2001	Venezuelan intellectual, historian, writer, television producer and politician.	Knight (TBA); Officer (TBA); Commander (TBA); Grand Officer (TBA); Grand Cross (1990)

== See also ==
- Legion of Honour
- List of Legion of Honour recipients by name
- List of foreign recipients of Legion of Honour by name
- List of foreign recipients of the Legion of Honour by country
- List of British recipients of the Legion of Honour for the Crimean War
- Legion of Honour Museum
- Ribbons of the French military and civil awards
- War Cross (France)
