= Francisco Cabrera =

Francisco Cabrera may refer to:

- Francisco Cabrera (baseball) (born 1966), former baseball player
- Francisco Cabrera (cyclist) (born 1979), Chilean cyclist
- Francisco Adolfo Cabrera, Argentine engineer
- Francisco Verdugo Cabrera (1561–1636), Roman Catholic prelate
