= Aníbal Fernández =

Argentine politician (born 1957)

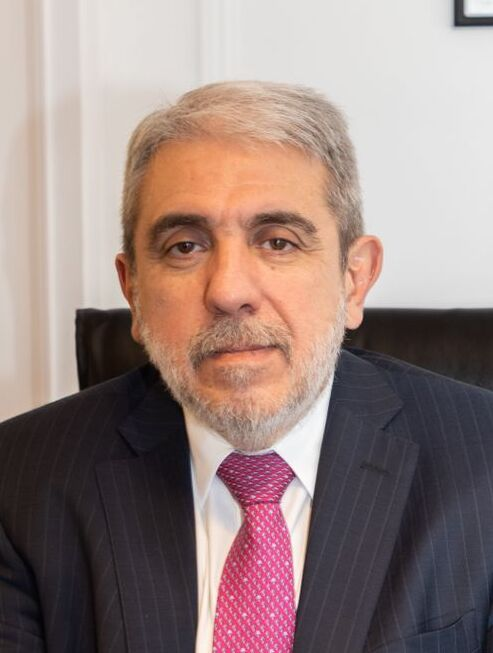
- Fernández in 2021

Minister of Security
- In office 20 September 2021 – 10 December 2023
- President: Alberto Fernández
- Preceded by: Sabina Frederic
- Succeeded by: Patricia Bullrich

Chief of the Cabinet of Ministers
- In office 26 February 2015 – 10 December 2015
- President: Cristina Fernández de Kirchner
- Preceded by: Jorge Capitanich
- Succeeded by: Marcos Peña
- In office 8 July 2009 – 10 December 2011
- President: Cristina Fernández de Kirchner
- Preceded by: Sergio Massa
- Succeeded by: Juan Manuel Abal Medina

General Secretary of the Presidency
- In office 16 December 2014 – 26 February 2015
- President: Cristina Fernández de Kirchner
- Preceded by: Oscar Parrilli
- Succeeded by: Eduardo de Pedro
- In office 2 January 2002 – 3 October 2002
- President: Eduardo Duhalde
- Preceded by: Luis Lusquiños
- Succeeded by: José Pampuro

National Senator
- In office 10 December 2011 – 16 December 2014
- Preceded by: Eric Calcagno
- Succeeded by: Juan Manuel Abal Medina Jr.
- Constituency: Buenos Aires

Minister of Justice, Security and Human Rights
- In office 10 December 2007 – 8 July 2009
- President: Cristina Fernández de Kirchner
- Preceded by: Alberto Iribarne
- Succeeded by: Julio Alak

Minister of the Interior
- In office 25 May 2003 – 10 December 2007
- President: Néstor Kirchner
- Preceded by: Jorge Matzkin
- Succeeded by: Florencio Randazzo

Minister of Production
- In office 3 October 2002 – 25 May 2003
- President: Eduardo Duhalde
- Preceded by: José Ignacio de Mendiguren
- Succeeded by: Débora Giorgi

Intendant of Quilmes
- In office 1991–1995
- Preceded by: Eduardo Camaño
- Succeeded by: Federico Scarabino

Personal details
- Born: 9 January 1957 (age 69) Quilmes, Buenos Aires, Argentina
- Party: Justicialist Party
- Other political affiliations: Front for Victory (2003–2015)
- Education: National University of Lomas de Zamora
- Profession: Lawyer
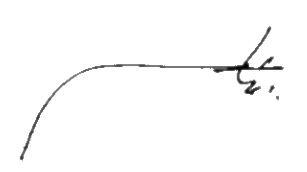
- Signature

Aníbal Domingo Fernández (Spanish pronunciation: [aˈniβal ðoˈmiŋɡo feɾˈnandes]; born January 9, 1957) is an Argentine Justicialist Party politician, lawyer, and certified public accountant. Throughout his career, he has remained a close ally to the former Presidents Néstor Kirchner and Cristina Fernández de Kirchner. Between 2021 and 2023, he served as Argentina's Minister of Security in the cabinet of President Alberto Fernández.

He has held several cabinet positions under three presidents, serving in these offices for a total of over nine years. He served as Minister of Production under Eduardo Duhalde, as Interior Minister under Néstor Kirchner, as Minister of Justice under Cristina Fernández de Kirchner, and as the President's Cabinet Chief from 2009 to 2011. Most recently, he served as interventor of the state-owned mining company Yacimiento Carbonífero Río Turbio. He is also the President of the Confederación Argentina de Hockey de Césped y Pista, having been elected unanimously for a second term.

== Early life and education ==
Born in Quilmes, Buenos Aires Province, Fernández received his CPA on 6 March 1982 from the Universidad Nacional de Lomas de Zamora and his law degree on 19 December 2001 from the same institution.

== Career ==
=== Early political career ===
Peronist from an early age, he entered public service, working for the City of Quilmes and City of Florencio Varela from 1983 as an advisor to the Budget Committee of the Senate of the province of Buenos Aires. He worked from 1985 to 1991 in an administrative capacity for the Peronist caucus in the Senate of the Province of Buenos Aires. Between 1985 and 1987, he was administrative secretary of the Peronist Movement Caucus of the Senate, and worked in the administrative secretariat between 1987 and 1991. He advised the City Council of Quilmes, between 1983 and 1989, and Florencio Varela, between 1983 and 1988.

In 1991, Fernández was elected Intendant of Quilmes.

He was elected to the Constitutional Convention of the province of Buenos Aires in 1994 and served as chairman of the Committee on the Electoral System of the Constitutional Convention. He wrote the Eighth Section of the Reformed Constitution of the Province of Buenos Aires.

In 1995 he became a provincial senator and chaired the Public Health committee. He won the award for best senator in 1996. In June 1997 he was appointed to assist the province's Minister of Government and Justice, Dr. José María Díaz Bancalari. In 1999, he was elected president of the party in Quilmes. In December 1999, Governor Carlos Ruckauf named him Secretary of Labour, promoting him to be the province's first Minister of Labour in 2001.

=== National politics ===
In January 2002, then-President of Argentina Eduardo Duhalde appointed Fernández as General Secretary of the Presidency in the national cabinet, and named him Minister of Production in October 2002. In 2003 he was elected to the National Congress, but resigned when Kirchner appointed him Interior Minister later that year.

Following the infant malnutrition scandal in Tucumán in November 2002, Fernández famously stated that this was caused by "a sick society and a ruling class that are sons of bitches, all of them."

He was believed to be planning to run for Governor of Buenos Aires Province in the 2007 elections, but his party (Front for Victory) chose Daniel Scioli instead. Newly elected President Cristina Kirchner appointed him to her cabinet as Minister of Justice, Security and Human Rights following her inauguration in December 2007. La Nación, in an editorial entitled “Justice: A Bad Start,” opined that the selection of Fernández as Minister of Justice “cannot enthuse those who hope for progress” in Argentinian justice.

Following the ruling Front for Victory's defeat in the June 28, 2009, mid-term elections, Fernández was tapped to replace Cabinet Chief Sergio Massa, who tendered his resignation to the President, effective July 7. Fernández held this position from July 8, 2009, until December 10, 2011.

In national elections on October 23, 2011, he was elected National Senator for the Province of Buenos Aires by 4,600,000 votes.

He left the Cabinet on December 10, 2011, on the same day began representing the province of Buenos Aires in the national senate. In January 2014, Fernández said that he might be interested in succeeding Cristina Fernández de Kirchner as president of Argentina. He praised the president, describing her as “absolutely attuned to the national situation.” He run for governor of the Buenos Aires Province instead, defeating Julián Domínguez in the primary elections. He lost the main elections to María Eugenia Vidal, of Republican Proposal, and announced that he may leave politics.

In 2021, he was appointed Minister of Security in replacement of Sabina Frederic, as part of a cabinet reshuffle following the government's poor showings in the 2021 legislative primary elections.

== Other controversies ==
In 2006, Anibal Fernández, who was serving as the Interior Minister at the time, referred to a paper by the San Andrés University later on published by the newspaper La Nación of growing insecurity in Argentina as a "sensation".

In December 2008, after Fernández blamed acts of railroad vandalism on the Partido Obrero, he was sued by the Partido Obrero for "slander, libel, moral damage and impact on the party's image."

Fernández called Buenos Aires Education Secretary Abel Posse an “ass” and a “misogynist” in December 2009.

Fernández called TV host Mirtha Legrand "uneducated, rude, ignorant” in January 2010, and maintained that she “says stupid things.”

In January 2010, Fernández called economist Martín Redrado a “fool” and "freak” who “thinks he is the center of the world and fails to show respect for Argentinians.”

Fernández attacked Nobel Prize-winning Peruvian author Mario Vargas Llosa and Spanish philosopher Fernando Savater in April 2011 for criticizing the policies of the Kirchner government. “They say stupid things,” he charged, just prior to the two writers’ appearances at a book fair. Vargas Llosa, Fernández complained, “insults President Cristina Kirchner every time he gets a chance,” and Savater “comes to Argentina to speak ill of the ruling party in Argentina.”

== Other activities ==
Fernández's notable activities and associations include the following:

- Chairman of Quilmes Athletic Club
- Honorary Professor at the University of Social Sciences of the National University of Lomas de Zamora
- President of Centro Latinoamericano de Administracion para el Desarrollo
- President of Grupo de Acción Financiera Internacional
- President of the Argentinian Field Hockey and Tennis Confederation
- President, Arturo Juaretche Institute for Strategy and Development

== Books ==
In May 2011 the Editorial Planeta published his first book, Zonceras argentinas y otras yerbas (Argentine follies and other stuff). The book is an attack on “the follies that do so much damage to the country” and to the Kirchner government.

The book's title is a reference to the 1968 book by Argentinian writer Arturo Jauretche, Manual de zonceras argentinas, a catalogue of foolish ideas about Argentina that are widely held by the Argentinian people, having been inculcated in them by primary school and reaffirmed by the new media.

The foreword was written by the President of Argentina, Cristina Fernández de Kirchner. The book was officially launched at the Frankfurt Book Fair on May 5, 2011, in front of a packed auditorium of government officials and most of the members of the Cabinet. In his presentation of the book, Fernández praised the president said that many books he had read were “full of false accusations” against the Kirchners. He singled out Mario Vargas Llosa for special criticism.

In January 2012, his book Zonceras Argentinas al Sol was published. He described it as a response to “organized absurdity,” by which, he explained, he meant the opposition to the Kirchners. At the official book presentation, mayor Dario Díaz Pérez Fernández said that the book would be “an invaluable tool for all youth who daily join the militancy for the project led by President Cristina Fernández de Kirchner.”

== Personal life ==
Fernández is divorced with one son and a daughter and is a passionate fan of Quilmes Atlético football club. He is the president of the Jauretche Institute, named for the local 20th-century pro-development activist Arturo Jauretche.

== Notes ==
Political offices
Preceded by Eduardo Camaño	Mayor of Quilmes; 1991–1995	Succeeded by Federico Scarabino
Preceded by Luis Lusquiños	General Secretary of the Presidency; 2002	Succeeded by José Pampuro
Preceded by Jorge Matzkin	Minister of the Interior; 2003–2007	Succeeded by Florencio Randazzo
Preceded by Alberto Iribarne	Minister of Justice; 2007–2009	Succeeded by Julio Alak
Preceded by Sergio Massa	Chief of the Cabinet of Ministers; 2009–2011	Succeeded by Juan Manuel Abal Medina
Preceded by Jorge Capitanich	Chief of the Cabinet of Ministers; 2015	Succeeded by Marcos Peña
Preceded by Sabina Frederic	Minister of Security; 2021–2023	Succeeded by Patricia Bullrich
