= José Ignacio de Mendiguren =

Argentine industrialist and politician

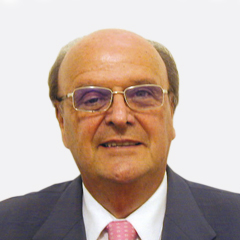

Secretary of Industry and Productive Development
- In office 16 August 2022 – 10 December 2023
- President: Alberto Fernández
- Preceded by: Daniel Scioli (as Minister of Productive Development)

National Deputy
- In office 10 December 2013 – 10 December 2021
- Constituency: Buenos Aires

Minister of Production
- In office 3 January 2002 – 3 October 2002
- President: Eduardo Duhalde
- Preceded by: Livio Kühl
- Succeeded by: Aníbal Fernández

Personal details
- Born: 23 August 1950 (age 76) Buenos Aires, Argentina
- Party: Justicialist Party (until 2013); Renewal Front (since 2013)
- Other political affiliations: United for a New Alternative (2013–2015); Frente de Todos (2019–present)
- Education: University of Buenos Aires

José Ignacio "Vasco" de Mendiguren (born 23 August 1950) is an Argentine industrialist and politician. He was chairman of the Argentine Industrial Union, director of the National Bank of Argentina, and Minister of Production during the presidency of Eduardo Duhalde. From 2013 to 2021, he was a National Deputy elected in Buenos Aires Province, as part of the Renewal Front and later as part of the Frente de Todos.

From 2020 to 2022, he was president of the Banco de Inversión y Comercio Exterior (BICE). In 2022, he was appointed as Secretary of Production by new economy minister Sergio Massa, mirroring his previous position as Minister of Production and succeeding Daniel Scioli. He remained in this role until December 2023.

== Early life and education ==
José Ignacio de Mendiguren was born on 23 August 1950 in Buenos Aires. He is the second child of Bruno de Mendiguren (1910–1950), a Basque immigrant exiled during the Spanish Civil War who had formed part of the Basque autonomous government as foreign minister. Bruno de Mendiguren died in a plane crash in Mar del Plata when his son was still an infant.

He studied law at the University of Buenos Aires, graduating in 1973. Upon attaining his degree, De Mendiguren worked at a private bureau as a specialist on corporate law and as a foreign investment advisor.

== Career ==
De Mendiguren became involved in the shoe-making business in 1976. He would later meet Roberto Frazeer, owner of Alpargatas S.A., with whom he partnered to commercialize rubber-sole espadrilles. De Mendiguren founded an industrial group that presently includes a textile company and a sports-related products chain. He has also invested in the agricultural business.

In 2001, during the presidency of Fernando de la Rúa, De Mendiguren was named president of the Argentine Industrial Union (UIA). He was an outspoken supporter of the devaluation of the peso as a means of improving the competitiveness of the Argentine economy.

In 2002, in the aftermath of the 2001 economic crisis, interim president Eduardo Duhalde appointed De Mendiguren as Minister of Production. De Mendiguren introduced reforms to further currency devaluation, which reached over 200% during his administration. The devaluation had a profound negative effect on salaries, while affecting positively on industrial indexes. He left the position less than a year after having assumed office, in October 2002, and was replaced by Aníbal Fernández.

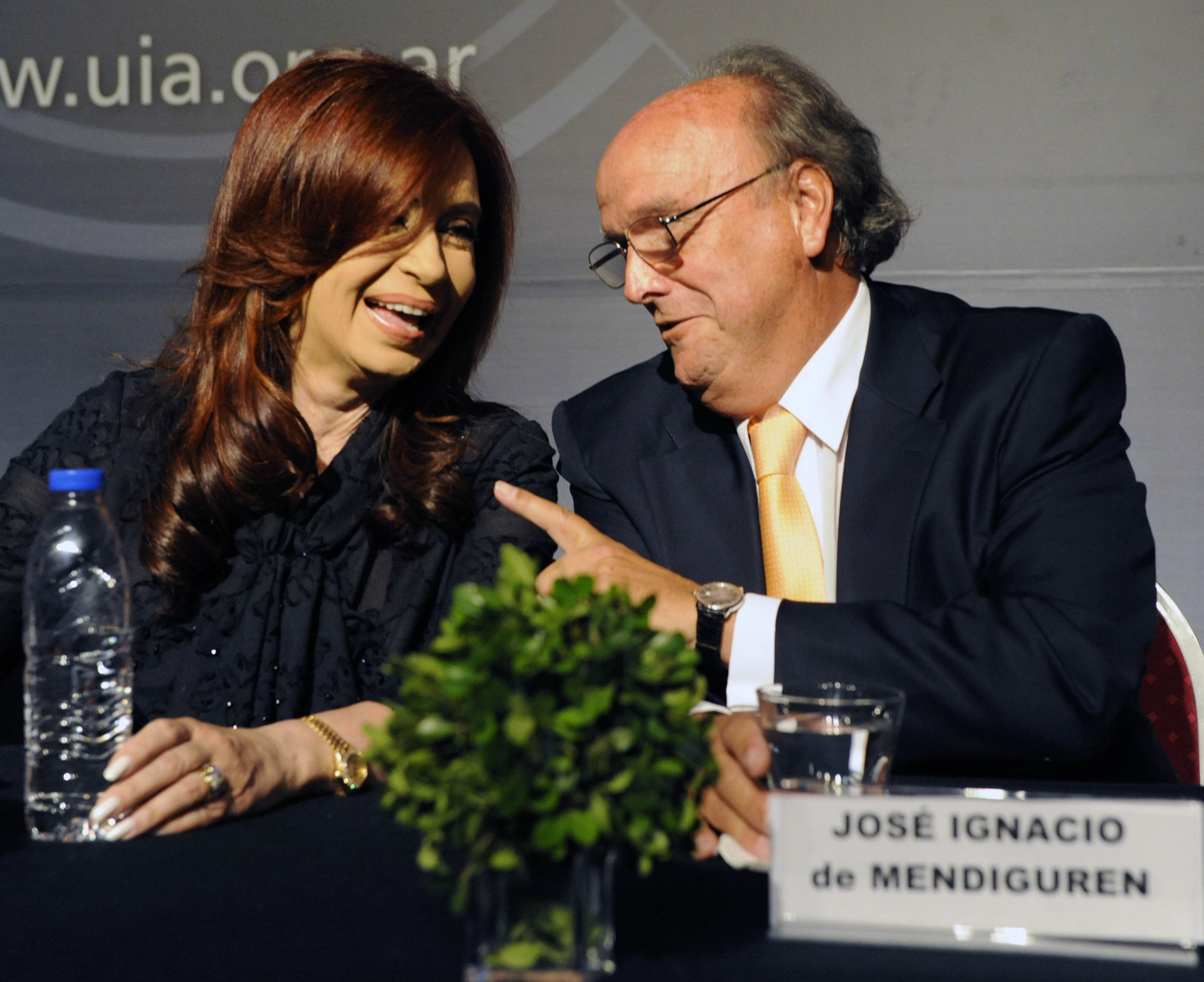
De Mendiguren (right) and President Cristina Fernández de Kirchner in 2011.

De Mendiguren returned to the private sector as a member of the UIA in 2004. He was re-elected president of the UIA on 27 April 2011, in replacement of Héctor Méndez. His second presidency corresponded to a period of political friendship with the government of Cristina Fernández de Kirchner, with whose administration the industrial sector had previously been generally at odds.

=== National Deputy ===
Ahead of the 2013 legislative election, De Mendiguren was selected as the fifth candidate to the Argentine Chamber of Deputies in the Renewal Front list in Buenos Aires Province. The list was the most voted in the province, with 43.95% of the vote, and De Mendiguren was easily elected. He was sworn in on 10 December 2013. He was re-elected in 2017, this time the fourth candidate in the 1País list (of which the Renewal Front was part). The list received 11.03%, just enough for De Mendiguren to be elected.

De Mendiguren was one of only three Renewal Front deputies to vote against a 2016 bill that would have made it harder for companies to fire employees; the bill was later vetoed by then-president Mauricio Macri.

In 2020, De Mendiguren was appointed president of the Banco de Inversión y Comercio Exterior (BICE). Instead of resigning, he took an indefinite unpaid leave from his position in the Chamber of Deputies, in order to prevent GEN 1País candidate Marcelo Díaz from taking his place in the Chamber.

== Electoral history ==
Electoral history of José Ignacio de Mendiguren
Election	Office	List	#	District	Votes			Result	Ref.
Election	Office	List	#	District	Total	%	P.	Result	Ref.
2013	National Deputy	Renewal Front	5	Buenos Aires Province	3,943,056	43.95%	1st (Note: Presented on an electoral list. The data shown represents the share of the vote the entire party/alliance received in that constituency.)	Elected	
2017	National Deputy	1País	4	Buenos Aires Province	1,028,385	11.03%	3rd	Elected	

Political offices
Preceded by Livio Kühl	Minister of Production; January 2002–October 2002	Succeeded by Aníbal Fernández
