= Marcelo Guinle =

Argentine judge and politician

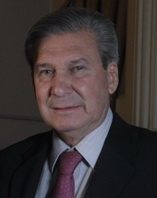

National Senator
- In office 10 December 2001 – 10 December 2015
- Constituency: Chubut

Provisional President of the Senate
- In office 4 December 2003 – 22 February 2006
- Preceded by: José Luis Gioja
- Succeeded by: José Pampuro

Mayor of Comodoro Rivadavia
- In office 10 December 1995 – 10 December 1999

Personal details
- Born: Marcelo Alejandro Horacio Guinle; 28 September 1947 Santa Fe, Argentina
- Died: 8 June 2017 (aged 69) Comodoro Rivadavia, Argentina
- Party: Justicialist Party
- Other political affiliations: Front for Victory 2003–2016)
- Spouse: Lilia Castillo
- Education: Pontifical Catholic University of Argentina
- Profession: Lawyer, accountant

Marcelo Alejandro Horacio Guinle (28 September 1947 – 8 June 2017) was an Argentine Justicialist Party politician. He served as a Senator for Chubut Province and was the president of the Supreme Court of Chubut until his death.

== Biography ==
Born in Santa Fe, Guinle enrolled at the Pontifical Catholic University of Argentina and earned a Law Degree in 1974. He served as a legal adviser to the state-owned energy firm YPF from 1974 to 1979, and entered afterward into a private practice in Chubut Province as a labor lawyer. He was later appointed as a Civil, Commercial and Labor Judge on the Comodoro Rivadavia circuit and on the Chamber of Appeals of both Trelew and Comodoro Rivadavia. Guinle married Lilia Castillo, and has three sons and three grandsons.

Guinle entered politics as Government Secretary for the Municipality of Comodoro Rivadavia in 1986. He was appointed Minister of Government, Education and Justice for Chubut Province by the newly elected Governor Néstor Perl in 1987, and he served in the post until 1989. He was among those elected to the National Constitutional Convention of 1994 to reform the Constitution of Argentina and in 1995 he was elected Mayor of Comodoro Rivadavia. He ran in 1999 as the Justicialist Party candidate for governor of Chubut Province, but lost to José Luis Lizurume of the center-left Alliance.

Guinle meanwhile earned a degree in Accountancy from the University of Morón in 2000. He was elected to the Argentine Senate in 2001 as the minority senator for Chubut; he was re-elected for a six-year term in 2003 with 47% of the vote. In December 2003 he became Provisional President of the Argentine Senate, and thus third in line to the Presidency of the Republic. He served in the post until February 2006, and remained in the Senate in the majority Front for Victory caucus established by President Néstor Kirchner. He was reelected in 2009 with 56% of the vote.

Preceded by José Luis Gioja	Provisional President of the Senate; 2003–2006	Succeeded by José Pampuro
