= Mauricio de María y Campos =

Mexican diplomat (1943–2021)

Mauricio de María Campos
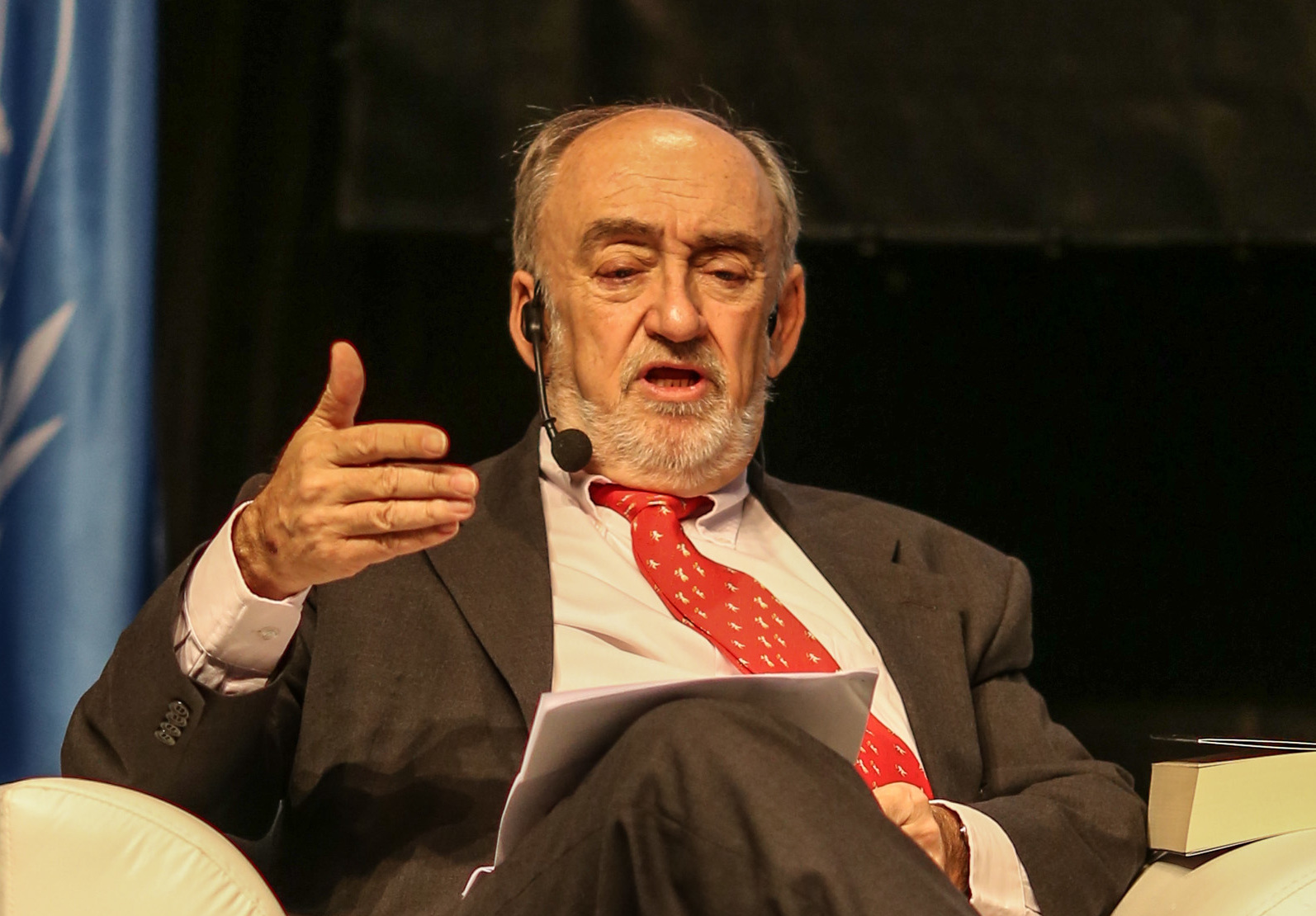

Director-General, UNIDO
- In office 1993 – December 1997
- Preceded by: Domingo Siazon, Jr.
- Succeeded by: Carlos Alfredo Magariños

Personal details
- Born: 13 October 1943 Mexico City, Mexico
- Died: 24 May 2021 (aged 77) Mexico City, Mexico
- Education: National Autonomous University of Mexico

Mauricio de Maria Campos (13 October 1943 – 24 May 2021) was a Director-General of the United Nations Industrial Development Organization (UNIDO) and former Mexican Ambassador to South Africa.

== Personal life ==
Mauricio de María y Campos was born in Mexico City. He obtained a BA Degree in Economics at the National Autonomous University of Mexico (UNAM) and a master's degree of Arts in Economic Development at Sussex University.

He died in his home in Mexico City on 24 May 2021.

== Career ==
- Undersecretary for Industrial Development at the Ministry for Trade and Industrial Development (1989–1992)
- Director General of the United Nations Industrial Development Organization (UNIDO) (1993–1997)
- Ambassador at Large for Special UN Projects and Advisor to the Undersecretary for United Nations, Africa and Middle Eastern Affairs (Ministry of Foreign Affairs of Mexico, 1998–2001)
- Mexican Ambassador to South Africa (March 2002 – 2007)
- Director of the Instituto de Investigaciones sobre Desarrollo Sustentable y Equidad Social de la Universidad Iberoamericana (2013?)
- President of the Centro Tepoztlán (2014–2018)
- Member of the Instituto para el Desarrollo Industrial y el Crecimiento Económico (IDIC)
- Associate Researcher at the Center for Economic Studies (CEE) of El Colegio de México
- Columnist at El Financiero
