= Ministry of Productive Development =

Former government ministry of Argentina

- Ministerio de Desarrollo Productivo
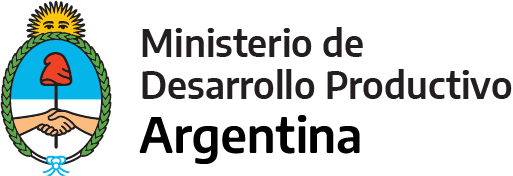

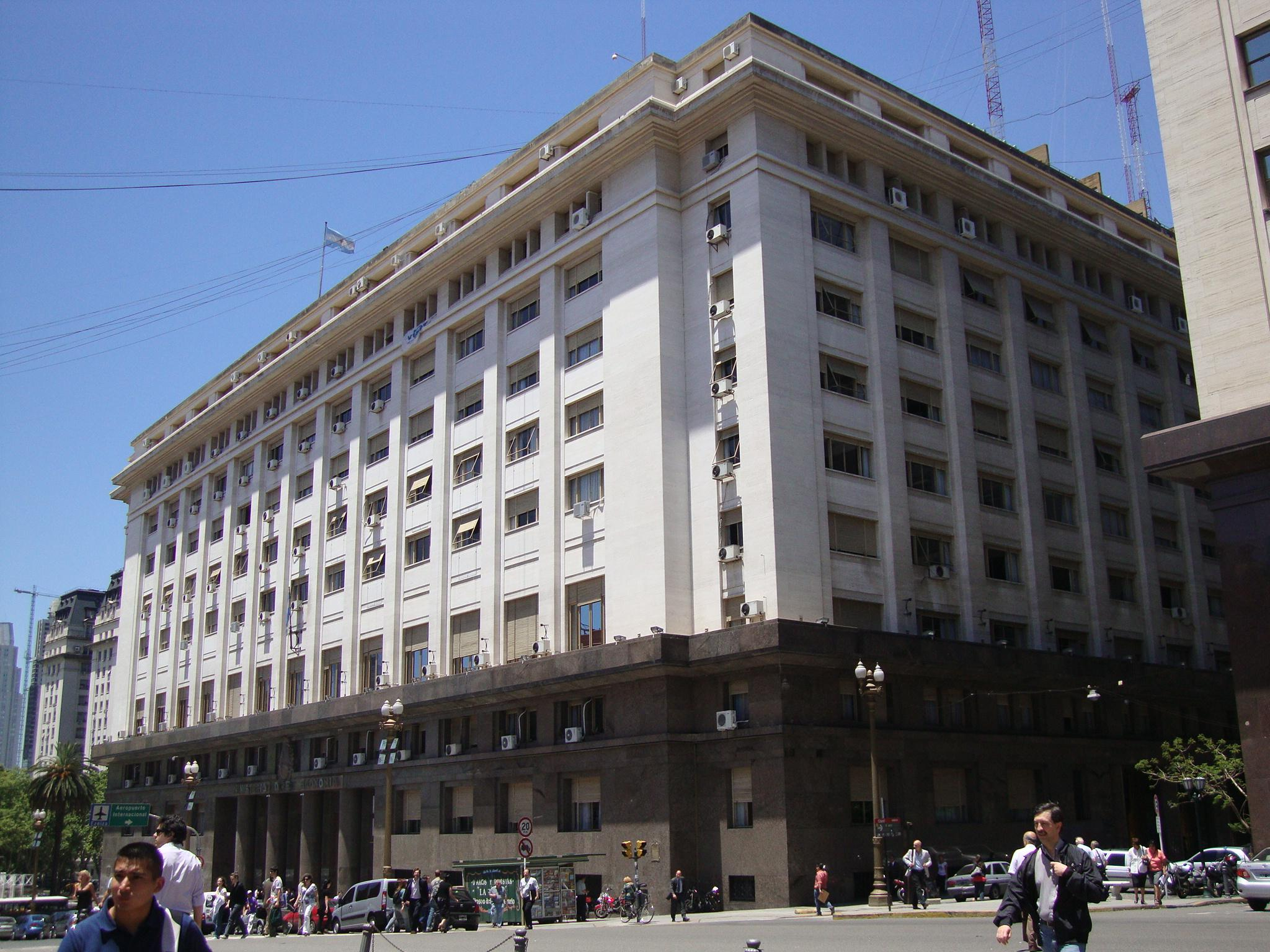
- Palacio de Hacienda, headquarters of the Ministry

Ministry overview
- Formed: 1949
- Dissolved: 2022; 4 years ago
- Jurisdiction: Government of Argentina
- Headquarters: Palacio de Hacienda, Hipólito Yrigoyen 250, Buenos Aires
- Annual budget: $ 129,937,317,367 (2021)

The Ministry of Productive Development (Spanish: Ministerio de Desarrollo Productivo) of Argentina was a ministry of the national executive power overseeing and advising on the promotion of industrial policies and foreign trade in Argentina.

Starting from its establishment in 1949, it was variously called Ministry of Industry, Industry and Commerce, Industry and Mining, Production, and Production and Labour. The ministry received its last name in 2019 in the cabinet of President Alberto Fernández; its last minister is Daniel Scioli. It was dissolved in August 2022 as part of a cabinet reorganization process; the Production portfolio currently stands as a secretariat of the Ministry of Economy.

== History ==
The Ministry of Productive Development was originally founded as the Ministry of Industry and Commerce in 1949, during the presidency of Juan Domingo Perón. Perón was especially interested in industrializing the Argentine economy, which at the time was heavily dependent on agriculture. The first minister in the portfolio was José Constantino Barro, who served during Perón's first presidential term from 1949 until 1952. In Perón's second presidential term, the ministry was renamed to simply "Ministry of Industry", a name that was retained by the military governments of Eduardo Lonardi and Pedro Eugenio Aramburu.

Successive administrations revived the ministry under various names and with various additional responsibilities, including that of commerce and mining; otherwise the industry and production portfolios were organized as secretariats of the Treasury Ministry. Since 2019, the Ministry's official name is Ministry of Productive Development, with Matías Kulfas at its helm.

== Structure and dependencies ==
At the time of its dissolution in August 2022, the Ministry of Productive Development counted with a number of centralized and decentralized dependencies. The centralized dependencies, as in other government ministers, were known as secretariats (secretarías) and undersecretariats (subsecretarías), as well as a number of other centralized agencies:

- Secretariat of Domestic Trade (Secretaría de Comercio Interior)
  - Undersecretariat of Domestic Trade Policies (Subsecretaría de Políticas para el Mercado Interno)
  - National Competition Defense Commission (Comisión Nacional de Defensa de la Competencia)
  - Undersecretariat of Consumer Defense Actions (Subsecretaría de Acciones para la Defensa de las y los Consumidores)
- Secretariat for Small and Medium-sized Businesses and Entrepreneurs (Secretaría de la Pequeña y Mediana Empresa y los Emprendedores)
  - Undersecretariat of Pyme Financing and Competition (Subsecretaría de Financiamiento y Competitividad Pyme)
  - Undersecretariat of Pyme Productivity and Regional Development (Subsecretaría de la Productividad y Desarrollo Regional Pyme)
  - Undersecretariat of Entrepreneurs (Subsecretaría de Emprendedores)
- Secretariat of Industry, Economy and Foreign Trade Administration (Secretaría de Industria, Economía del Conocimiento y Gestión Comercial Externa)
  - Executive Unit for the Argentine Foreign Trade Single Registry National Regime (Unidad Ejecutora del Régimen Nacional de Ventanilla Única de Comercio Exterior Argentino)
  - National Foreign Trade Commission (Comisión Nacional de Comercio Exterior)
  - Undersecretariat of Industry (Subsecretaría de Industria)
  - Undersecretariat of Commercial Policy and Administration (Subsecretaría de Política y Gestión Comercial)
  - Undersecretariat of Knowledge Economy (Subsecretaría de Economía del Conocimiento)
- Secretariat of Mining (Secretaría de Minería)
  - Undersecretariat of Mining Development (Subsecretaría de Desarrollo Minero)
  - Undersecretariat of Mining Policy (Subsecretaría de Política Minera)
- Secretariat of Energy (Secretaría de Energía)
  - Undersecretariat of Electric Energy (Subsecretaría de Energía Eléctrica)
  - Undersecretariat of Hydrocarbon Fuels (Subsecretaría de Hidrocarburos)
  - Undersecretariat of Energy Planning (Subsecretaría de Planeamiento Energético)

Several decentralized agencies also reported to the Ministry of Productive Development, such as the National Institute of Industrial Technology (INTI), the National Institute of Industrial Property (INPI), the Buenos Aires Central Market, and the Banco de Inversión y Comercio Exterior.

== Headquarters ==
The Ministry of Productive Development was headquartered in the Palacio de Hacienda ("Palace of the Treasury"), located in the Monserrat barrio in Buenos Aires, which has historically housed the Ministry of Economy (formerly known as the Ministry of the Treasury) as well as other ministerial portfolios such as public works and transport. The building was built in two stages from 1937 to 1950 and stands on Hipólito Yrigoyen street, across from the emblematic Plaza de Mayo square and the Casa Rosada, seat of the Presidency.

== List of ministers ==
No	Minister	Party	Term	President
Ministry of Industry and Commerce (1949–1952)
1	José Constantino Barro	Peronist Party	7 June 1949 – 4 June 1952	Juan Domingo Perón
Ministry of Industry (1952–1956)
2	Rafael Amundarain	Peronist Party	4 June 1952 – 27 July 1954	Juan Domingo Perón
3	Orlando Leonardo Santos	Peronist Party	27 July 1954 – 21 September 1955	Juan Domingo Perón
4	Horacio Morixe	Independent	23 September 1955 – 13 November 1955	Eduardo Lonardi
5	Álvaro Alsogaray	Independent	13 November 1955 – 8 June 1956	Pedro Eugenio Aramburu
Ministry of Industry and Commerce (1956–1958)
6	Rodolfo Martínez	Christian Democratic Party	8 June 1956 – 11 March 1957	Pedro Eugenio Aramburu
7	Julio César Cueto Rúa	Independent	19 March 1957 – 1 May 1958	Pedro Eugenio Aramburu
Ministry of Industry and Mining (1981)
8	Eduardo Oxenford	Independent	29 March 1981 – 21 August 1981	Roberto Viola
9	Livio Kühl	Independent	22 August 1981 – 12 December 1981	Roberto Viola
Ministry of Production (2002–2003)
10	José Ignacio de Mendiguren	Independent	3 January 2002 – 3 October 2002	Eduardo Duhalde
11	Aníbal Fernández	Justicialist Party	3 October 2002 – 25 May 2003	Eduardo Duhalde
Ministry of Industry (2008–2015)
12	Débora Giorgi	Independent	26 November 2008 – 10 December 2015	Cristina Fernández de Kirchner
Ministry of Production (2015–2018)
13	Francisco Cabrera	Republican Proposal	10 December 2015 – 16 June 2018	Mauricio Macri
14	Dante Sica	Independent	21 June 2018 – 5 September 2018	Mauricio Macri
Ministry of Production and Labour (2018–2019)
14	Dante Sica	Independent	5 September 2018 – 10 December 2019	Mauricio Macri
Ministry of Productive Development (2019–present)
15	Matías Kulfas	Independent	10 December 2019 – 4 June 2022	Alberto Fernández
16	Daniel Scioli	Justicialist Party	15 June 2022 – 3 August 2022	Alberto Fernández
