= Argentine presidential line of succession =

The Argentine presidential line of succession is the order in which officials may assume the office of the president of Argentina in the case of vacancy due to illness, death, resignation or impeachment (as a final consequence of a trial in the Chamber of Deputies and subsequent indictment and sentencing by the Senate).

The line of succession is specified by the Constitution of Argentina, Article 88, as well as the Law of Presidential Acephaly No. 25,716 (itself an amendment of Law No. 20,972).

The line begins with the vice president, who would finish the remainder of the term. If the vice president were to be impeded as well, the temporary line of succession would be as follows: the provisional president of the Senate, followed by the president of the Chamber of Deputies, and finally the president of the Supreme Court of Justice. The successor would exercise the responsibilities of the presidential office until the cause of the incapacity has ceased, or a new president is elected by the Legislative Assembly.

Presidential line of succession
1.	Vice president
2.	Provisional president of the Senate
3.	President of the Chamber of Deputies
4.	President of the Supreme Court

== Constitutional dispositions and legislation ==
- Article 88 of the Argentine constitution places the vice president at the start of the line of succession and allows Congress to choose a provisional successor in the scenario that neither the president nor vice president can take office.

Article 88: In case of sickness, absence from the Capital, death, resignation or destitution of the President, the Executive Power shall be exercised by the vice president of the Nation. In case of death or incapacity of the president and vice president of the Nation, Congress shall determine which public official must exercise the presidency, until the cause of the incapacity has ceased or a new president is elected.

— Section II. Of the Executive Branch. First chapter. Of its nature and duration. Constitution of the Argentine Nation (1994)

- Article 153 of the National Electoral Code, for the case where elections have already been carried out, determines that in case of death or resignation of either the president-elect or vice president-elect, article 88 of the Constitution shall be applied, that is if the president-elect is unable to take office due to death or resignation, he shall be replaced by the vice president-elect. Article 154 goes on to determine that, in case of death of both, new elections shall be carried out.

Article 153: In the case of death or resignation of either of the elected candidates that were proclaimed, what is declared in article 88 of the National Constitution shall be carried out. Article 154: In the case of death of either of the two candidates who received the most votes in the first round and before the second round is carried out, a new election shall be carried out.

— Title VII. National Electoral System. Chapter I. Of the election of the President and Vice President of the Nation. National Electoral Code

- Law 25,716 of Presidential Acephaly, which was sanctioned on 28 November 2002 and came into effect on 7 January 2003, indicates in its first article that, if the absence of the presidency and vice presidency is definitive, the provisional president of the Senate will exercise the executive power until Congress decides the definitive succession in the Legislative Assembly. If the provisional president of the Senate cannot take office, the duty shall fall on the president of the Chamber of Deputies, and if he too is unable, the president of the Supreme Court of Justice shall take office. According to Article 6, this official shall add to his office, "In exercise of Executive Power".
- Article 2 of Law 20,972 (superseded in 2003 by Law 25,716), the Assembly has 48 hours to meet with a quorum of two-thirds of the total members, and in a single meeting, presided over by the President of the Senate, it must decide on the definitive succession. Voting is by an absolute majority of those present. In the event of a tie, a new vote is taken between the two most voted candidates. If the tie persists, it is broken by the vote of the President of the Assembly.
- Article 4 indicates that, if an elected president and vice president are currently in office, they must automatically be designated to occupy the position. Otherwise, the Assembly must choose from among the deputies and senators of the National Congress and the provincial governors the official who will perform the vacant office. Furthermore, the chosen official must meet the constitutional requirements in Article 90 to be president of the Nation and must have been born in the national territory or be the child of a native citizen. This official must be sworn in according to Article 93 of the National Constitution.

== History ==
During the Paraguayan War (1865–1870), then president Bartolomé Mitre headed the Argentinean troops, delegating the office to his vice president Marcos Paz. Paz died on 2 January 1868 due to a cholera epidemic affecting Buenos Aires at that time, leaving the office vacant since president Mitre could not return immediately. As no law on the subject was in place, Ministers Guillermo Rawson (Interior), Juan Andrés Gelly y Obes (War), Marcelino Ugarte (Foreign Affairs), Lucas González (Taxation) and José Evaristo Uriburu (Justice) assumed the office transitorily.

Because of this situation, Congress sanctioned law 252 of 19 September 1868, thereby defining the order of succession: Upon vacancy of the president and vice president, the office will be assumed firstly by the provisional president of the Senate, and if they were unable, by the president of the Chamber of Deputies, and if missing both, the president of the Supreme Court of Justice, who shall invoke national elections within 30 days and hand over command to the president-elect to finish the remaining term.

This law was superseded by law 20,972 of 11 July 1975, which maintained the order of succession but replaced the call to national elections with a session of the Legislative Assembly (Deputies and Senate, with a quorum of two-thirds) within 48 hours following the vacancy of the office. The successor shall choose the new president by absolute majority from within the present Senators, Deputies and Governors to finish the term. This law was modified by law 25,716 of 28 November 2002, introducing the possibility that the president-elect and vice president-elect take office if elections have taken place.

== Applications ==
The law was first applied on 29 March 1962. Then president Arturo Frondizi was deposed by the armed forces and imprisoned. After the coup, the military commanders failed to agree on the next steps. Supreme Court Judge Julio C. Oyhanarte and Minister of Defense Rodolfo Martínez took advantage of this deadlock, thinking of a legal path to maintain democracy and, with the office of the vice president also vacant after the resignation of Alejandro Gómez in November 1958, convoked José María Guido, provisional president of the Senate, to the Palace of Justice to take the oath of office and avoid a coup d'état.

An application of the law as intended did not occur until between December 2001 and January 2002, a period known in Argentina as the "five-president week". On 21 December 2001, then president Fernando de la Rúa resigned amidst a deep economic crisis, violent riots, police violence and a lack of support from his party, the Unión Cívica Radical, as well as from the opposition, the Justicialist Party, to form a coalition government. As the vice presidency was also vacant due to Carlos Álvarez's resignation in October 2000, provisional president of the Senate, Federico Ramón Puerta, assumed the presidency temporarily and summoned the Legislative Assembly on 23 December, when governor of San Luis Adolfo Rodríguez Saá was elected by 169 votes for to 138 against, and elections were invoked for 3 March 2002.

Rodríguez Saá announced a default on external debt and the creation of a new currency, the Argentino, but on 30 December, after a failed meeting with governors in Chapadmalal, he traveled to his home province and resigned from office. The next day Puerta also resigned from the office of provisional president of the Senate, and the president of the Chamber of Deputies, Eduardo Camaño, assumed the presidency temporarily. Camaño again summoned the Legislative Assembly on 1 January 2002 to accept Rodríguez Saá's resignation and elect a new president. Senator Eduardo Duhalde was subsequently elected by 262 votes for, 21 against and 18 abstentions, and served until 10 December 2003. Duhalde announced the end of the peso-dollar pegging and the flexibilization of the corralito, raising the exchange limit from 200 pesos to 1,000 pesos a month.

== Current line of succession ==
No.	Position	Incumbent	Image	Party
1.	Vice President	Victoria Villarruel		La Libertad Avanza
2.	Provisional president of the Senate	Bartolomé Abdala		La Libertad Avanza
3.	President of the Chamber of Deputies	Martín Menem		La Libertad Avanza
4.	President of the Supreme Court	Horacio Rosatti		Justicialist Party
