= Order of precedence in Argentina =

Relative preeminence of officials for ceremonial purposes

The order of precedence in Argentina is a symbolic hierarchy of officials used to direct protocol. It is regulated by Presidential Decree 2072 of 10 October 1993, signed by then President Carlos Menem, and former ministers Guido di Tella and Carlos Ruckauf.

The order of succession should the presidency unexpectedly become vacant is specified by Law 25716 of 2002.

== Order of precedence ==
Precedence is determined by the office; names of incumbents as of 2019 are listed.

1. President of the Nation (Javier Milei)
2. Vice President of the Nation (Victoria Villarruel)
3. Provisional President of the Senate (Bartolomé Abdala)
4. President of the Chamber of Deputies (Martin Menem)
5. President of the Supreme Court (Justice Horacio Rosatti)
6. Living former Presidents of the Nation in order of seniority
  1. Isabel Perón
  2. Adolfo Rodríguez Saá
  3. Eduardo Duhalde
  4. Cristina Fernández de Kirchner
  5. Mauricio Macri
  6. Alberto Fernández
7. Provincial Governors and the Chief of Government of Buenos Aires
8. Chief of the Cabinet of Ministers (Guillermo Francos)
9. National Cabinet Ministers
10. General Secretary of the Presidency of the Nation (Karina Milei)
11. Chief of Staff of the Armed Forces (Lt. Gen. (Air Force) Jorge Alberto Chevalier)
12. Commanders of each armed force (Navy, Air Force and Army)
13. Ministers of the Supreme Court
14. General Prosecutor of the Nation (Eduardo Casal)
15. National Prosecutor for Administrative Investigations (Sergio Rodríguez)
16. Secretaries of the Presidency of the Nation
17. Chief of the Casa Militar
18. Vice presidents of both chambers of the National Congress
19. Provincial Vice-governors
20. Argentine ambassadors in office abroad
21. Cardinals
22. President of the Argentine Episcopal Conference (Archbishop José María Arancedo)
23. Archbishop of Buenos Aires (Mario Poli)
24. Presidents of each parliamentary bloc at the Senate and the Chamber of Deputies of the Nation
25. National Senators and National Deputies
26. Archbishops
27. Vice presidents of Provincial Senates and Chambers of Deputies
28. Presidents of Provincial Supreme Courts
29. Major Generals of the Army
30. Rear Admirals - Upper Half
31. Major Generals of the Air Force
32. Argentine Ambassadors based in Argentina
33. President of the National Criminal Court of Appeals (Judge Juan Carlos Rodríguez Basavilbaso)
34. Presidents of National and Federal Courts of Appeals
35. Bishops and their equivalents in other officially recognised religions
36. Secretaries at the National Congress
37. Members of the National Court of Criminal Appeals
38. Members of National and Federal Courts of Appeals
39. Undersecretaries of State
40. Undersecretary of the Treasury
41. Commander of the Argentine Federal Police (Commissioner-Major Néstor Vallecca)
42. Commander of the Argentine National Gendarmerie (Commandant-general Héctor Bernabé Schenone)
43. Commander of the Argentine Naval Prefecture (Prefect Oscar Adolfo Arce)
44. Brigade Generals of the Army
45. Rear Admirals - Lower Half
46. Brigade Generals of the Air Force
47. Argentine Chargé d'affaires in office abroad
48. Secretaries at the Supreme Court
49. Federal and National Judges
50. National Directors
51. Rectors of National Universities
52. Presidents of National Academies
53. President of the Central Bank of Argentina (Santiago Bausili)
54. President of the Banco de la Nación Argentina (Eduardo Hecker)
55. Presidents of state-owned companies (reparticiones autárquicas)
56. Deputy Rectors of National Universities
57. General Directors
58. Argentine Consuls in office abroad
59. Argentine diplomatic Attachés in office abroad
60. Director of the Argentine National Library (Juan Sasturain)
61. Director of National Museums
62. Deans of National Faculties
63. Presidents of National Professional Associations

== Order of succession ==
The order of succession should the presidency unexpectedly become vacant is specified by Law 25716 of 2002:

- The Vice President
- The Provisional President of the Senate
- The President of the Chamber of Deputies
- The President of the Supreme Court of Justice

until Congress designates a president according to article 88 of the Constitution of Argentina.
