= Eric Calcagno =

Argentine sociologist, journalist, diplomat and politician

Eric Calcagno y Maillmann
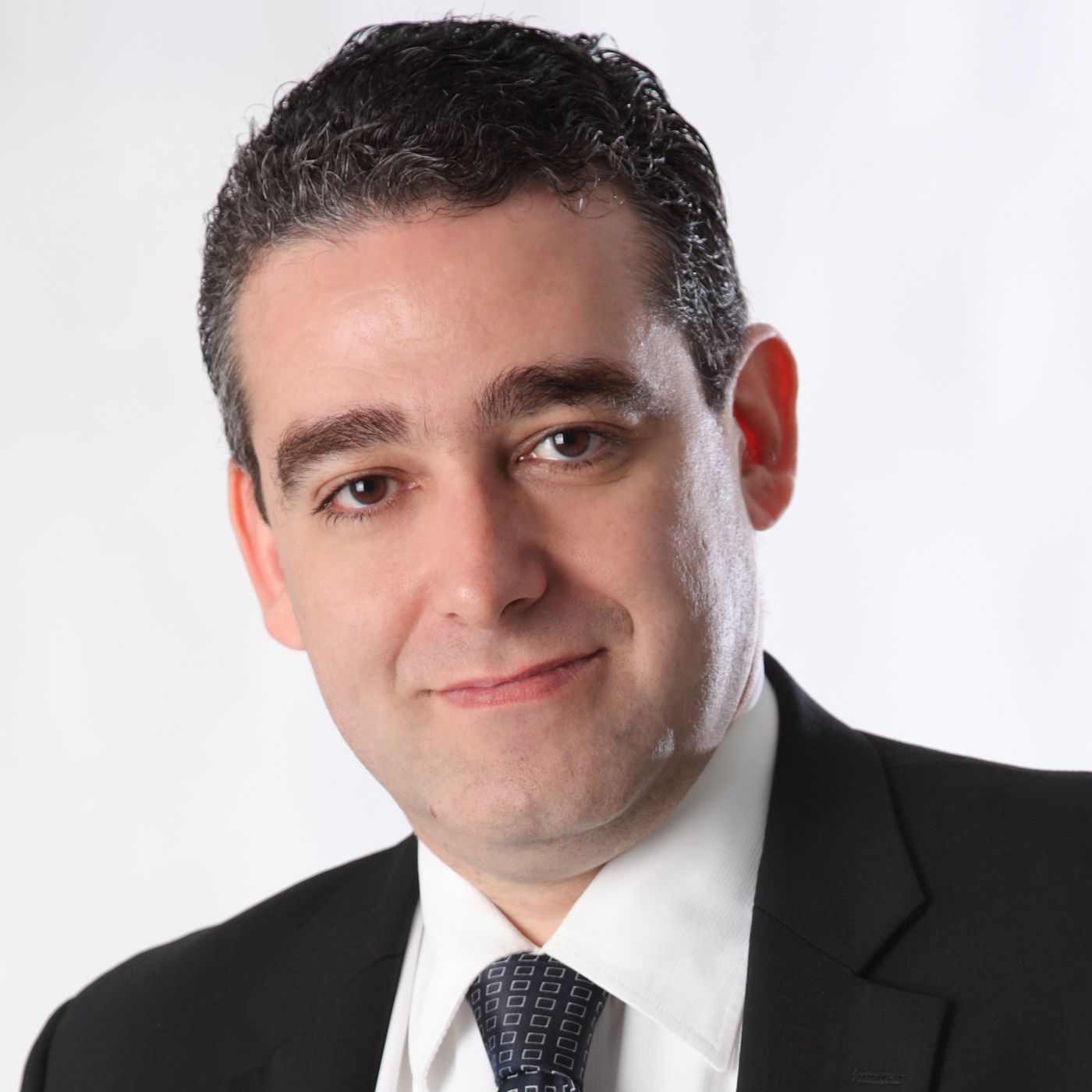

National Deputy
- In office 10 December 2011 – 10 December 2015
- Constituency: Buenos Aires

National Senator
- In office 10 December 2007 – 10 December 2011
- Preceded by: Cristina Fernández de Kirchner
- Succeeded by: Aníbal Fernández
- Constituency: Buenos Aires

Undersecretary of Small and Medium Enterprises
- In office 18 February 2008 – July 2008
- President: Cristina Fernández de Kirchner
- Preceded by: Matías Kulfas
- Succeeded by: Jorge Caradonti

Argentine Ambassador to France
- In office December 2005 – December 2007
- President: Néstor Kirchner
- Preceded by: Archibaldo Lanús
- Succeeded by: Luis Ureta Sáenz Peña

Personal details
- Born: 9 April 1967 (age 59) La Plata, Argentina
- Party: Justicialist Party
- Other political affiliations: Front for Victory
- Education: École Nationale d'Administration
- Profession: Sociologist

Eric Calcagno y Maillmann (born 9 April 1967) is an Argentine sociologist, journalist, diplomat and politician. A member of the Justicialist Party, Calcagno served terms in both houses of the Argentine Congress, first as a Senator from 2007 to 2011, and later as a Deputy from 2011 to 2015. He was Argentina's ambassador to France from 2005 to 2007.

== Early life and education ==
Born in La Plata, Calcagno comes from a family with a strong background in academia and connections with France. His grandfather, Alfredo Domingo Calcagno, rector of the National University of La Plata, was the Argentine ambassador to UNESCO in Paris during the Presidency of Arturo Frondizi. His father, Alfredo Eric Calcagno, studied at the Institut d'Études Politiques de Paris before working for the United Nations Economic Commission for Latin America for more than twenty years.

Calcagno studied at French schools and, in the early 1990s, graduated from the École Nationale d'Administration in France in public administration and from the Sorbonne in sociology.

== Career ==
Calcagno worked as an economics consultant and journalist, including for Le Monde Diplomatique (Southern Cone Edition), Diario Hoy of La Plata, the magazines Veintitrés and Veintitrés Internacional and Terra. With his father he co-wrote two books on politics and economics: Para entender la política, entre la ilusión de lo óptimo y la realidad de lo pésimo (English translation of title: How to understand politics. Between a utopian illusion and the worst reality), Editorial Norma (Buenos Aires, 1999) and La deuda externa explicada a todos (los que tienen que pagarla) (English translation of title: Foreign Debt Explained to Those Who Have to Pay it), Editorial Catálogos (Buenos Aires, 2000).

He published Terra incógnita, crónica de la caída de la convertibilidad (English translation of title: Terrae Incognita: a chronicle of the fall of the dollar peg of the Argentine peso), a chronicle of the 1998–2002 Argentine great depression, in 2005. He was known as a critic of neoliberal economics and the Washington Consensus. He teamed up with his father to teach economics at the National University of Lanús, Buenos Aires and taught a range of other universities, including as Director of the Centre of Studies of National Economic Thought (CEPEN) at the University of Buenos Aires.

== Political career ==
In 2005, Calcagno was a reserve member on the Front for Victory list for the Senate for Buenos Aires Province. The list was headed by Cristina Fernández de Kirchner and was successful in the October elections, winning the maximum two places. Shortly after the election, in December 2005, Calcagno was named Ambassador to France, after Rafael Bielsa had accepted that position only to reject it a day later in public. In 2007, upon the election of Fernández de Kirchner as President of Argentina, Calcagno replaced her in the Senate. However, within ten days, he was granted a leave of absence to take up the President's offer of a position in government. He became the subsecretary of Small and Medium Enterprises.

Calcagno's post at the Senate was left vacant until July 2008, when the tax farm issue arose. In March, the government tried to introduce a new taxation system on agricultural exports. Nationwide mass protests were the result, and the government eventually was forced to send the government's farm exports tax proposal to the Argentine Congress. Calcagno had to leave his office and return to the Senate in order to vote in favour of the government, as a close tie was due. This vote was eventually decided by Vice-president Julio Cobos, who rejected the farm exports tax bill. Calcagno remained in the Senate, where he took over the chairmanship of the Infrastructure, Transport and Housing committee soon afterwards.

He was elected National Deputy for the Buenos Aires Province in 2011 from the Front for Victory party. His term expired on 10 December 2015.
