= José Pampuro =

Argentine politician (1949–2021)

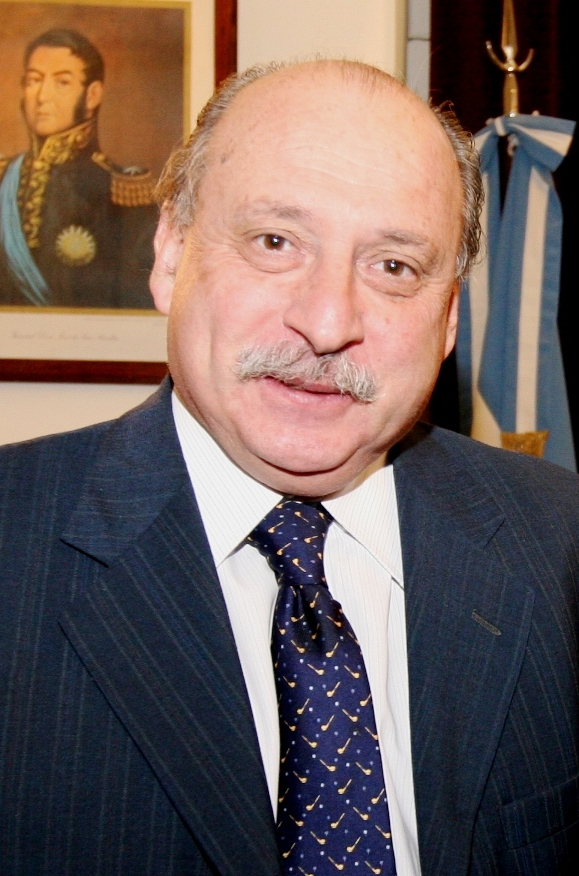

Provisional President of the Senate
- In office 22 February 2006 – 30 November 2011
- Preceded by: Marcelo Guinle
- Succeeded by: Beatriz Rojkés de Alperovich

National Senator
- In office 10 December 2005 – 10 December 2011
- Constituency: Buenos Aires

Minister of Defense
- In office 25 May 2003 – 28 November 2005
- President: Néstor Kirchner
- Preceded by: Horacio Jaunarena
- Succeeded by: Nilda Garré

General Secretary of the Presidency
- In office 3 October 2002 – 25 May 2003
- President: Eduardo Duhalde
- Preceded by: Aníbal Fernández
- Succeeded by: Oscar Parrilli

Personal details
- Born: 28 December 1949 Buenos Aires, Argentina
- Died: 21 January 2021 (aged 71)
- Party: Justicialist Party
- Other political affiliations: Front for Victory (2003–2011)
- Education: University of Buenos Aires
- Profession: Physician

José Juan Bautista Pampuro (28 December 1949 – 21 January 2021) was an Argentine politician of the Justicialist Party. He served as Defense Minister under President Kirchner and also as senator for Buenos Aires Province. From 2006 to 2011 he was the Provisional President of the Senate.

== Political career ==
Pampuro entered public service in 1983, when he was named Public Health Secretary to the Mayor of Lanús, Manuel Quindimil. He was elected to the Lower House of Congress on the populist Justicialist Party ticket in 1987, and was named Minister of Health and Social Policy for Buenos Aires Province by newly elected Governor Eduardo Duhalde in 1991.

He was named director of the Buenos Aires Provincial Office (each Argentine province maintains one in the nation's capital) in 1993, and remained in the post until being returned by voters to Congress in 1999. Eduardo Duhalde, appointed President of Argentina by Congress during a crisis in 2002, named Pampuro General Secretary of the Presidency, and on 25 May 2003, he was retained in government by President Néstor Kirchner, who named Pampuro his first Defense Minister.

Pampuro was elected to the Senate on the Front for Victory slate alongside Cristina Fernández de Kirchner in the 2005 mid-term elections, in which the center-left Front for Victory did well. He was elected Provisional President of the Senate on 22 February 2006, putting him second in line to the presidency, and twice as President of the Mercosur Parliament (during the first half of 2008 and the first half of 2010).

Pampuro retired from the Senate in 2011 with the distinction of being the first man in Argentina to twice be succeeded by women who were first to hold their respective posts: as Defense Minister by Nilda Garré, and as Provisional President of the Senate by Beatriz Rojkés de Alperovich.

== Personal life ==
Pampuro was born in Buenos Aires in 1949. He enrolled at the University of Buenos Aires and earned a Medical Degree.

Pampuro died of cancer on 21 January 2021 at a hospital in Buenos Aires, aged 71.

Political offices
| Preceded by Aníbal Fernández | General Secretary of the Presidency; 2002–2003 | Succeeded by Oscar Parrilli |
| Preceded by Horacio Jaunarena | Minister of Defense; 2003–2005 | Succeeded by Nilda Garré |
| Preceded by Marcelo Guinle | Provisional President of the Senate; 2006–2011 | Succeeded by Beatriz Rojkés de Alperovich |
