= Matías Kulfas =

Argentine economist and professor

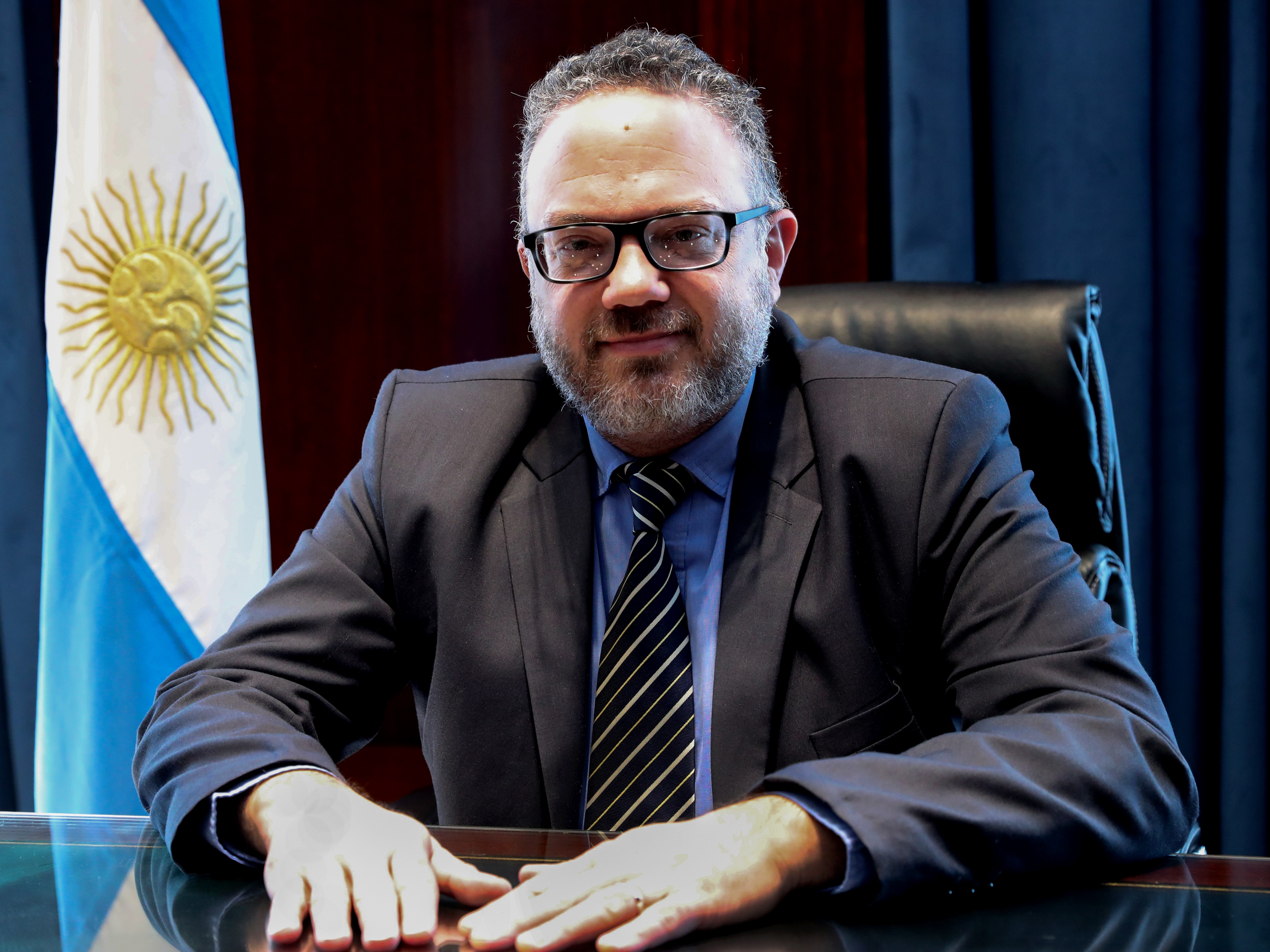
- Kulfas in 2020

Minister of Productive Development
- In office 10 December 2019 – 4 June 2022
- President: Alberto Fernández
- Preceded by: Dante Sica (as Minister of Production and Labour)
- Succeeded by: Daniel Scioli

General Manager of the Central Bank of Argentina
- In office 22 February 2012 – 18 November 2013
- Preceded by: Benigno Vélez
- Succeeded by: Juan Carlos Isi

Undersecretary of Small and Medium-sized Businesses and Regional Development
- In office 24 April 2006 – 18 February 2008
- President: Néstor Kirchner; Cristina Fernández de Kirchner
- Preceded by: Federico Poli
- Succeeded by: Eric Calcagno

Personal details
- Born: 8 April 1972 (age 54) Buenos Aires, Argentina
- Party: Independent; Frente de Todos (since 2019)
- Education: University of Buenos Aires; Latin American Faculty of Social Sciences

Matías Sebastián Kulfas (Spanish pronunciation: [maˈtias seβasˈtjaŋ ˈkulfas]; born 8 April 1972) is an Argentine economist and professor. He served as Minister of Productive Development from 10 December 2019 to 4 June 2022, in the cabinet of President Alberto Fernández, and previously served as Undersecretary of Small and Medium-sized Businesses from 2006 to 2008, as well as a member of the board of directors of the National Bank of Argentina (2008–2012) and as General Manager of the Argentine Central Bank (2012–2013).

== Early life and education ==
Kulfas was born in 1972 in Buenos Aires. He studied high school at the Escuela Superior de Comercio Carlos Pellegrini, and then studied economy at the University of Buenos Aires, finishing his licenciatura in 1995. He then went on to finish a master's degree in Political Economy at the Latin American Faculty of Social Sciences, and later became a Doctor in Social Sciences in the same university. Since 2005 he has been a permanent faculty at the University of Buenos Aires School of Economics, where he teaches Argentine economic structure. He also teaches economic development at the National University of General San Martín.

== Political career ==
Starting in 1994 Kulfas began working in the Ministry of the Treasury as a consultant at the Secretariat of Economic Planning (until 1995) and then at the National Directorate of International Accounting, from 1995 to 1996. Between 2000 and 2003, he was at the forefront of the Centro de Estudios para el Desarrollo Económico Metropolitano (CEDEM), an agency dependent on the Secretariat of Economic Development of the Buenos Aires city government, and he worked as an economic consultant in the same secretariat as well. In 2004, he began working in the Bank of Buenos Aires City, where he held the position of Economic Studies manager.

In 2006, Kulfas was appointed Undersecretary of Small and Medium-sized Businesses and Regional Development, then a centralized agency dependent on the Ministry of Economy. He worked under the successive administrations of Economy Ministers Felisa Miceli, Miguel Gustavo Peirano and Martín Lousteau.

=== Banco Nación and Central Bank ===
In 2008, he joined the board of directors of the Bank of the Argentine Nation (Banco Nación), then going on to be appointed General Manager of the Central Bank of Argentina in 2013; he remained in the post until 2013. Under his management, the Central Bank created a dependency specifically oriented toward financial services user complaints.

In 2017, Kulfas joined Alberto Fernández, Santiago Cafiero, Cecilia Todesca and others in forming Grupo Callao, a non-Kirchnerist Peronist think tank.

=== Ministry of Productive Development ===
On 10 December 2019, following speculation that he might be appointed Minister of Economy, Kulfas was appointed Minister of Productive Development by newly elected President Alberto Fernández as part of the new cabinet of Argentina, succeeding Dante Sica.

At the onset of the economic crisis caused by the COVID-19 pandemic and the subsequent lockdown measures, the Production and Labour ministries launched two complimentary social assistance schemes: the Ingreso Familiar de Emergencia ("Emergency Family Income", IFE) and the Asistencia de Emergencia al Trabajo y la Producción ("Emergency Labour and Production Assistance", ATP). The IFE programme granted 10,000 monthly pesos to informal sector workers and self-employed workers whose income was affected by the lockdown. In total, over 8 million people across the country during two months, and later continued to be issued for people living in urban centres where lockdown measures continued in place throughout 2020. On the other hand, the ATP programme granted half of the salaries of workers (active or otherwise) for a number of businesses. Lastly, the government forbid all terminations and unilateral suspensions of labour contracts for 120 days, later extending the measure to cover all of 2020 and 2021.

In June 2022, Fernández asked for Kulfas' resignation after allegations that the minister had made off-the-record remarks about Vice President Cristina Fernández de Kirchner.

Political offices
Preceded by Dante Sica	Minister of Productive Development; 2019–2022	Succeeded by Daniel Scioli
