= Provisional president of the Argentine Senate =

Provisional President of the Argentine Senate
- Presidente Provisional del Honorable Senado de la Nación
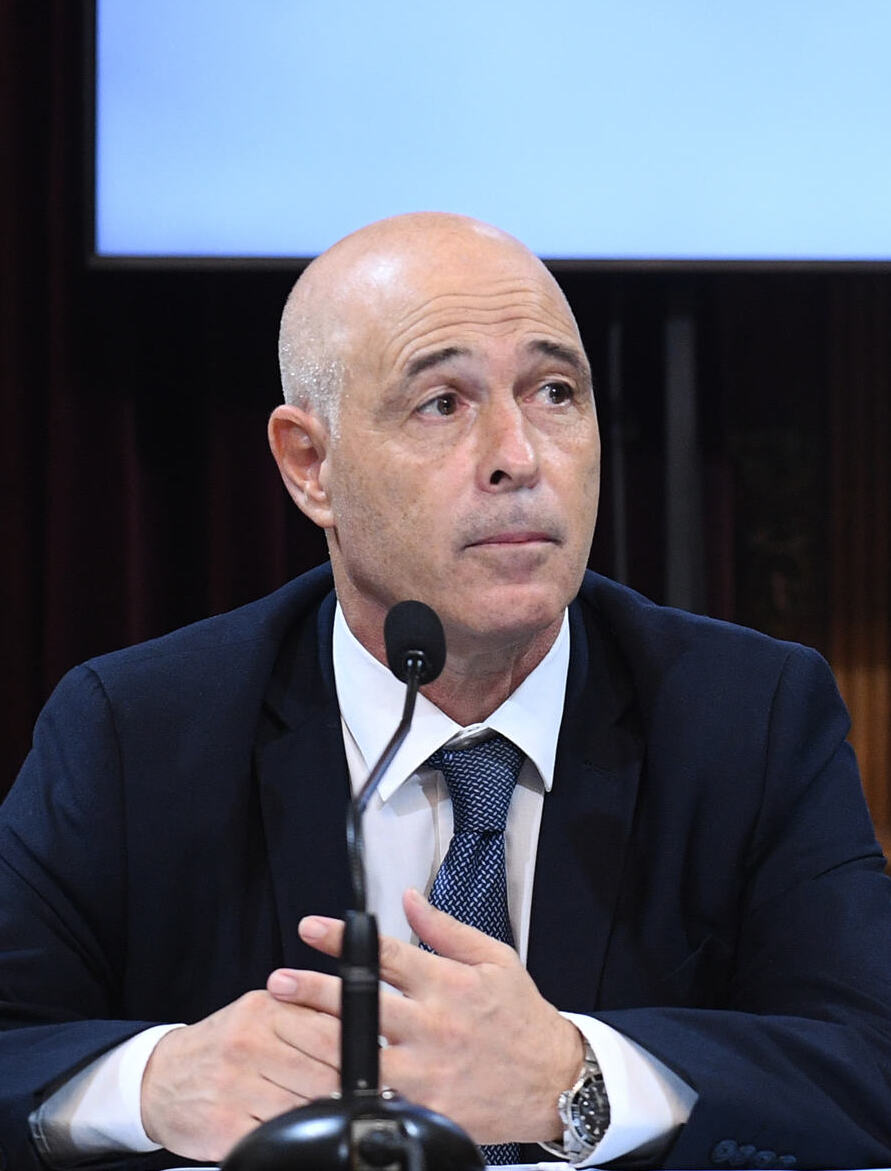
- Incumbent; Bartolomé Abdala since 13 December 2023
- Term length: One year, renewable
- Inaugural holder: José Acevedo
- Formation: Argentine Constitution of 1853
- Deputy: Juan Carlos Marino, First Vice President
- Website: Honorable Senado de la Nación

The provisional president of the Senate of the Argentine Nation (Spanish: Presidente provisional del Senado de la Nación Argentina), commonly known as the provisional president, is the highest-ranking official in the Argentine Senate, the upper chamber of the National Congress of Argentina barring the presence of the titular president of the Senate, the vice president of Argentina.

The provisional president of the Senate is second in the line of succession to the presidency in Argentina. At the outset of each legislative year, which per governing statutes takes place during the first ten days of December, the members of the Senate elects the provisional president. Minority parties in the chamber elect three vice presidents.

== List of provisional presidents ==
President	Party	Term start	Term end
José Acevedo	Unitarian Party	1855	1856
Tomás Guido	Unitarian Party	1856	1858
Mariano Fragueiro	Unitarian Party	1858	1858
Pascual Echagüe	Federalist Party	1858	1859
Manuel Leiva	Unitarian Party	1859	1860
Pascual Echagüe	Federalist Party	1860	1861
Nicolás Calvo	Federalist Party	1861	1862
Marcos Paz	Unitarian Party	1862	1862
Valentín Alsina	Unitarian Party	1862	1864
Pedro Ferré	Federalist Party	1864	1865
Valentín Alsina	Unitarian Party	1865	1869
Salustiano Zavalía	Unitarian Party	1869	1870
Manuel Quintana	Autonomist Party	1870	1875
Wenceslao Díaz Colodrero	National Autonomist Party	1875	1876
Dardo Rocha	National Autonomist Party	1876	1878
Benjamín Paz	National Autonomist Party	1878	1880
Aristóbulo del Valle	National Autonomist Party	1880	1881
Benjamín Paz	National Autonomist Party	1881	1883
Antonino Cambaceres	National Autonomist Party	1883	1889
Julio Argentino Roca	National Autonomist Party	1889	1890
Manuel Derqui	National Autonomist Party	1890	1891
Miguel Nougués	National Autonomist Party	1891	1892
Julio Argentino Roca	National Autonomist Party	1892	1892
Mariano Varela	National Autonomist Party	1892	1893
José Gálvez	National Autonomist Party	1893	1894
Leonidas Echagüe	National Autonomist Party	1894	1895
Julio Argentino Roca	National Autonomist Party	1895	1898
Bartolomé Mitre	National Autonomist Party	1898	1902
José Evaristo Uriburu	National Autonomist Party	1902	1905
Félix Uriburu	National Autonomist Party	1905	1906
Benito Villanueva	National Autonomist Party	1906	1908
José Evaristo Uriburu	National Autonomist Party	1908	1909
Benito Villanueva	National Autonomist Party	1909	1910
Domingo Pérez	National Autonomist Party	1910	1910
Antonio del Pino	National Autonomist Party	1910	1911
Benito Villanueva	National Autonomist Party	1911	1922
Leopoldo Melo	UCR-A	1922	1928
Luis Etchevehere	UCR-A	1928	1930
Congress closed during the dictatorship of José Félix Uriburu (1930–1932)
Robustiano Patrón Costas	National Democratic Party	1932	1943
Congress closed during the dictatorship of the Revolución del 43 (1943–1946)
Ernesto Bavio	UCR-JR	1946	1947
Alberto Teisaire	Peronist Party	1947	1953
Alberto Iturbe	Peronist Party	1953	1954
Ramón Albariño	Peronist Party	1954	1955
Congress closed during the dictatorship of the Revolución Libertadora (1955–1958)
José María Guido	Intransigent UCR	31 March 1958	30 March 1962
Eduardo Gamond	People's UCR	12 August 1963	28 June 1966
Congress closed during the dictatorship of the Revolución Argentina (1966–1973)
Alejandro Díaz Bialet	Justicialist Party	3 May 1973	13 July 1973
José Antonio Allende	Christian Democratic Party	13 July 1973	25 April 1975
Ítalo Luder	Justicialist Party	8 July 1975	24 March 1976
Congress closed during the dictatorship of the National Reorganization Process (1976–1983)
Edison Otero	Radical Civic Union	29 November 1983	31 May 1989
Eduardo Menem	Justicialist Party	31 May 1989	1 December 1999
José Genoud	Radical Civic Union	1 December 1999	9 October 2000
Mario Losada	Radical Civic Union	11 October 2000	10 December 2001
Ramón Puerta	Justicialist Party	10 December 2001	30 December 2001
Juan Carlos Maqueda	Justicialist Party	4 January 2002	27 December 2002
José Luis Gioja	Justicialist Party	27 December 2002	4 December 2003
Marcelo Guinle	Justicialist Party–FPV	4 December 2003	22 February 2006
José Pampuro	Justicialist Party–FPV	22 February 2006	30 November 2011
Beatriz Rojkés de Alperovich	Justicialist Party–FPV	30 November 2011	28 February 28, 2014
Gerardo Zamora	Civic Front for Santiago	28 February 2014	3 December 2015
Federico Pinedo	PRO–Cambiemos	3 December 2015	10 December 2019
Claudia Ledesma Abdala	Justicialist Party–FdT	10 December 2019	10 December 2023
Bartolomé Abdala	Libertarian Party–LLA	13 December 2023	Incumbent
