= Karina Rabolini =

Argentine businesswoman and model (born 1967)

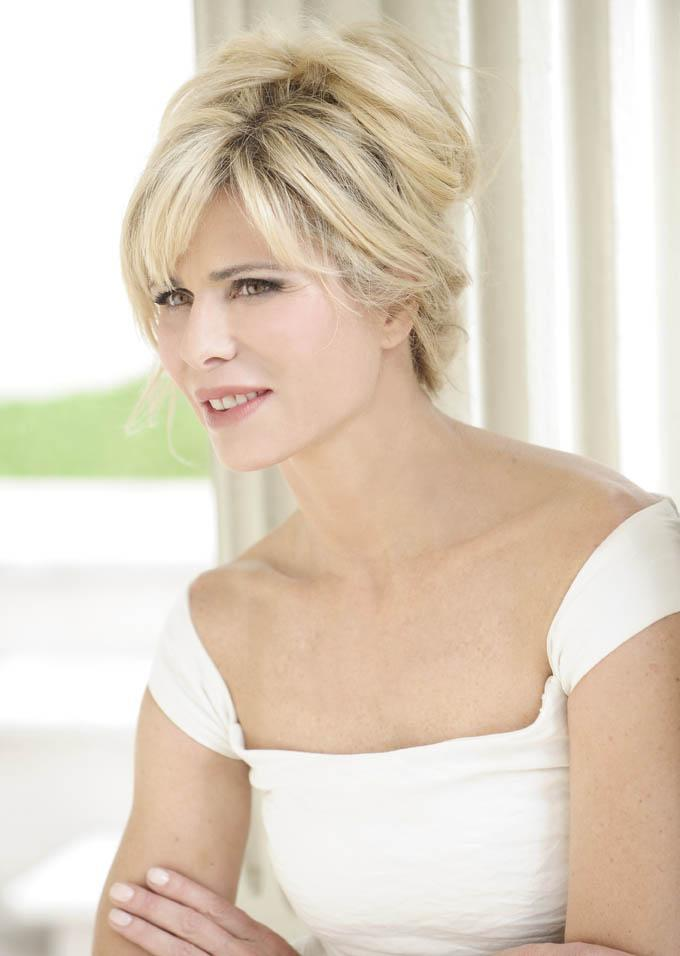
- Karina Rabolini in 2013

Second Lady of Argentina
- In office 25 May 2003 – 10 December 2007
- Vice President: Daniel Scioli
- Preceded by: Liliana Chiernajowsky
- Succeeded by: Cristina Cerutti

First Lady of Buenos Aires Province
- In office 10 December 2007 – 10 December 2015
- Governor: Daniel Scioli
- Preceded by: María Helena Chaves
- Succeeded by: Ramiro Tagliaferro (First Gentleman)

President of the Bank of the Province of Buenos Aires Foundation
- In office 10 December 2007 – 10 December 2015

Personal details
- Born: Karina Eliana Rabolini; 27 April 1967 (age 59) Elortondo, Santa Fe Province, Argentina
- Spouses: Daniel Scioli (m. 1991; div. 2016); Ignacio Castro Cranwell (m. 2024)
- Domestic partner: Ignacio Castro Cranwell (2016–2024)
- Occupation: Businesswoman

Karina Eliana Rabolini (born 27 April 1967) is an Argentine businesswoman and former model. She was the second lady of Argentina from 2003 to 2007 and first lady of Buenos Aires Province from 2007 to 2015 as the wife of governor Daniel Scioli. She also served as the president of the Bank of the Province of Buenos Aires Foundation during the latter term.

== Birth and childhood ==
Karina Rabolini was born in Elortondo, Santa Fe Province on 27 April 1967, the daughter of Isabel Elena Pettenatti and Raúl Alberto Rabolini. She has two siblings – Andrea, two years older, and Santiago, sixteen years younger. Together with her family, she moved to Buenos Aires, where she gained recognition as a model.

== Career and family ==
In 1986 she met powerboat racer and businessman Daniel Scioli, whom she married in a civil ceremony on 10 December 1991, followed by a religious ceremony at San Ignacio Parish on 12 December. They separated in 1998, and she decided to move to Europe, but in 2001 they reunited. Scioli became the Vice President of Argentina on 25 May 2003, and Rabolini served as second lady until the end of his term on 10 December 2007.

When Scioli assumed the governorship of Buenos Aires Province in 2007, in addition to the duties of first lady, Rabolini served as president of the Bank of the Province of Buenos Aires Foundation.

As head of the foundation, Rabolini promoted microcredit policies as a tool for economic and social inclusion. Microcredit as a means of access to employment became one of her main interests, an issue she presented on at the 2014 International Congress of Social Responsibility (CIRS). In partnership with the Bank of the Province of Buenos Aires and international organizations, she expanded a pre-existing program by offering more opportunities to new entrepreneurs. She also oversaw several institutional programs, such as "A Look for Children", through which the foundation, together with a group of ophthalmologists, performed eye checks for Buenos Aires primary school students, and provided glasses if necessary. The "Helping to Get There" program supplied bicycles to students of rural schools to allow them to attend every day.

Although her political participation was limited to protocol, she was usually present at public events, as well as interviews and political television programs.

Her work at the foundation has been recognized with various awards, such as the Cilsa Social Commitment Award (2011), the ISALUD Career Award (2011), and being named honorary godmother of the Ricardo Gutiérrez Hospital Solidarity Festival (2013).

Rabolini again separated from Scioli after his defeat in the 2015 presidential election, and she also left her office at the Bank of the Province of Buenos Aires. The couple divorced in 2016, and she began a relationship with Ignacio Castro Cranwell, who was Scioli's press chief during the 2015 presidential campaign. They made their relationship public in 2017 and married in May 2024.

She currently markets her own brand of perfumes, beauty products, and glasses.

== Awards ==
- 2011: Cilsa Social Commitment Award
- 2011: ISALUD Award
