= Luis Ureta Sáenz Peña =

Argentine diplomat (born 1944)

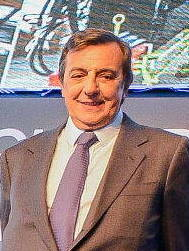
Luis María Ureta Sáenz Peña

Luis María Ureta Sáenz Peña (born 30 May 1944) is an Argentine businessman and diplomat. He was the Argentine Ambassador to France since 2007, and formerly headed the operations of Peugeot-Citroën in Argentina.

The great-grandson of former President Luis Sáenz Peña and the great nephew of President Roque Sáenz Peña, Ureta attended secondary school in France and studied law and political science.

Ureta was named chairman of Peugeot-Citroën in Argentina, and chairman of the Association of Car Manufacturers of Argentina (ADEFA). During the 1998–2002 Argentine great depression in 2002, he convinced his parent company to invest 50 million Euros in their El Palomar plant to manufacture the Peugeot 307.

Ureta replaced Eric Calcagno as Ambassador to France in December 2007; Calcagno returned to Argentina to succeed President-elect Cristina Fernández de Kirchner in the Argentine Senate. Governor Felipe Solá reportedly turned down the role before it was offered to Ureta Sáenz Peña. Ureta had himself been offered a role in the government as Industry Secretary which he turned down. The decision to appoint him was confirmed in February 2008.

Ureta Sáenz Peña has received the honours of Chevalier and Officier of the Légion d'honneur and Chevalier of the Ordre national du Mérite. He resigned his post as Ambassador to France in December 2010, citing personal obligations.
