= Francisco Adolfo Cabrera =

Argentine engineer

Francisco Cabrera
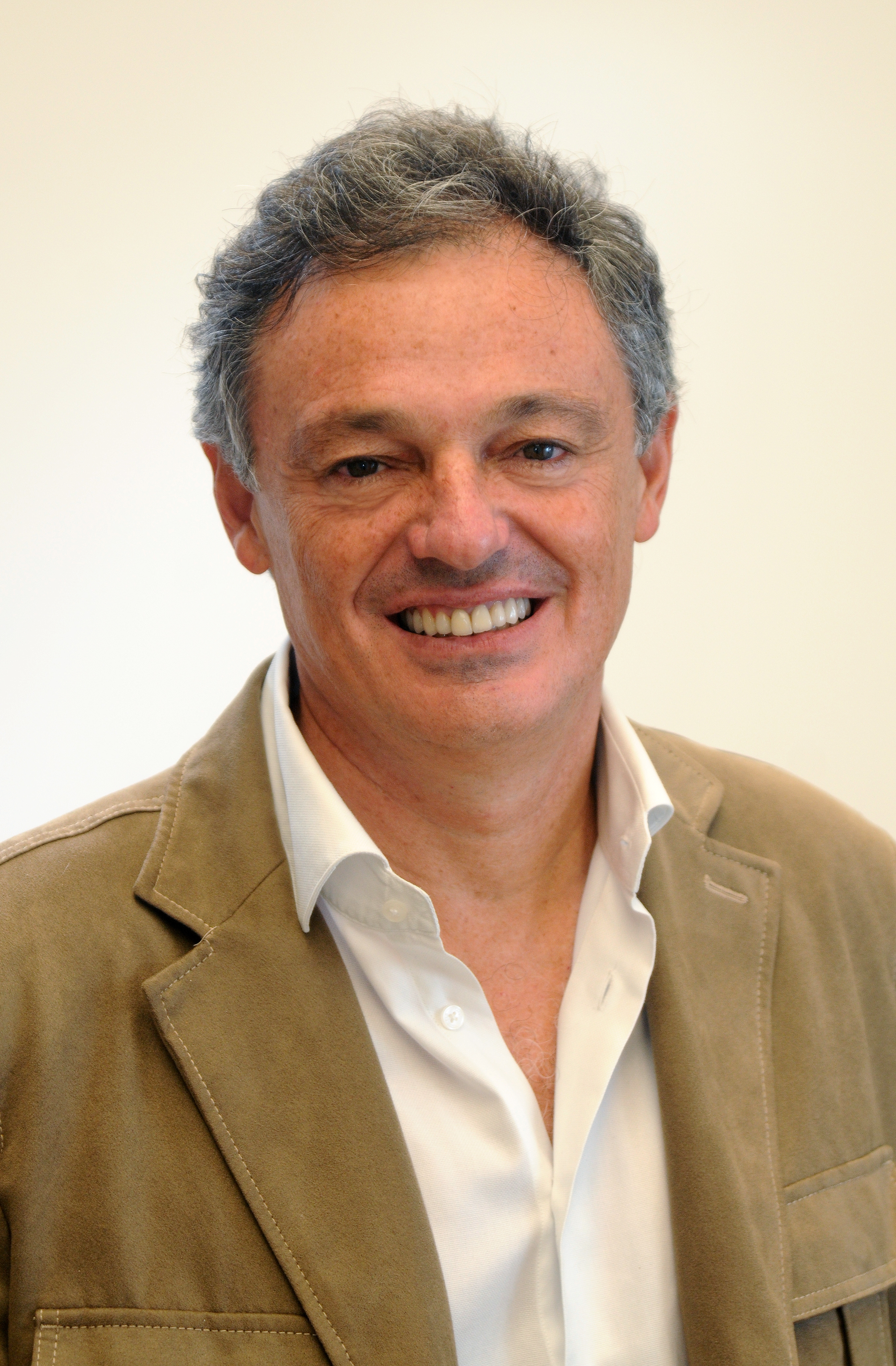
- Cabrera in 2012

Ministry of Productive Development of Argentina
- In office 10 December 2015 – 16 June 2018
- President: Mauricio Macri
- Preceded by: Débora Giorgi (Industry)
- Succeeded by: Dante Sica (Production and Labor)

Minister of Economic Development of the City of Buenos Aires
- In office 10 December 2007 – 10 December 2015
- Preceded by: Eduardo Hecker

Personal details
- Born: Francisco Adolfo Cabrera; 16 August 1955 (age 71) Mendoza, Argentina
- Party: Republican Proposal (PRO)
- Education: Universidad de Mendoza

Francisco Adolfo Cabrera (born August 16, 1955, in Mendoza) is an Argentine businessman and politician affiliated with Republican Proposal (PRO). He served as Minister of Productive Development of Argentina from 2015 to 2018. He subsequently served as president of the Bank of Investment and Foreign Trade (BICE) and as an honorary advisor to the President of Argentina.Previously, he was Minister of Economic Development of the Autonomous City of Buenos Aires from 2007 to 2015.

== Early life and business career ==
Cabrera is an electrical and electronics engineer. He obtained his degree from the Universidad de Mendoza in 1981.He has a Master in Business Administration from the Higher School of Economics and Business Administration.(ESEADE).

He began his career at Hewlett-Packard. He worked at Grupo Roberts and HSBC, where he was a board member of La Buenos Aires Seguros and Docthos and led the bank's retail sector. He was also the first chief executive officer of Máxima AFJP.

=== Media ===
Between 2002 and 2007, he was Executive Director of the newspaper La Nación and served on the board of directors of Los Andes of Mendoza and La Voz del Interior of Córdoba.

== Political activity ==
In his youth, he was part of the Union for University Opening (UPAU), an Argentine university political group with a liberal orientation, as well as the Union of the Democratic Centre (UCeDé) party.

Cabrera formed Fundación Pensar with Mauricio Macri, a think tank dedicated to the study of public policy, which he chaired from 2010 to 2019.

=== Minister of Economic Development of the City of Buenos Aires ===
On December 10, 2007, he was appointed Minister of Economic Development of the City of Buenos Aires.

One of the policies he implemented as city minister was the creation of Creative Districts, which concentrate specific activities linked to culture and innovation, such as the Technology District of Parque Patricios, which concentrates more than 300 information and communication technology (ICT) companies, and the Audiovisual District (where 228 film and television production companies were established).

=== Ministry of Productive Development of Argentina ===
On December 10, 2015, Cabrera was appointed Ministry of Productive Development of the Nation by Mauricio Macri. His administration was organized around four pillars: "integration with the world; competitiveness and innovation; modern labor market and a simple State, allied with production".

In 2016, the national government established the promotion of the automotive industry as an objective, increasing from 22% to 38% the proportion of national parts per car produced in the country. He supported the Auto Parts Law project, an initiative by deputy and union leader Oscar Romero, passed in June 2016, which seeks to promote the auto parts industry by facilitating tax credits to automotive terminals, truck factories and agricultural machinery that use parts produced in Argentina.

In July 2016, the SME Law was passed, which provides tax benefits to small and medium-sized enterprises and which impacted 61% of SMEs registered in the country.

On April 21, 2017, he received in Madrid the Grand Cross of the Order of Isabella the Catholic.

On June 16, 2018 he was replaced in his position by Dante Sica and appointed as president of the Investment and Foreign Trade Bank and Ad-Honorem advisor to President Mauricio Macri.

== Current activities ==
After leaving the ministry, Francisco Cabrera assumed the position of president of the Bank of Investment and Foreign Trade (BICE). He remained in the position until January 2020. During his tenure, BICE was awarded by ALIDE (Latin American Association of Development Finance Institutions) for issuing the first sustainable bond in South America, worth US$30 million, allocated to productive financing for more than 200 SMEs in Argentina.

In October 2022, Cabrera participated in the IDEA Colloquium, an annual meeting of leaders organized by the Institute for Business Development of Argentina. No longer holding an official position, he stated that he was participating "in business mode".
