= Daniel Scioli =

Argentine politician and sportsman (born 1957)

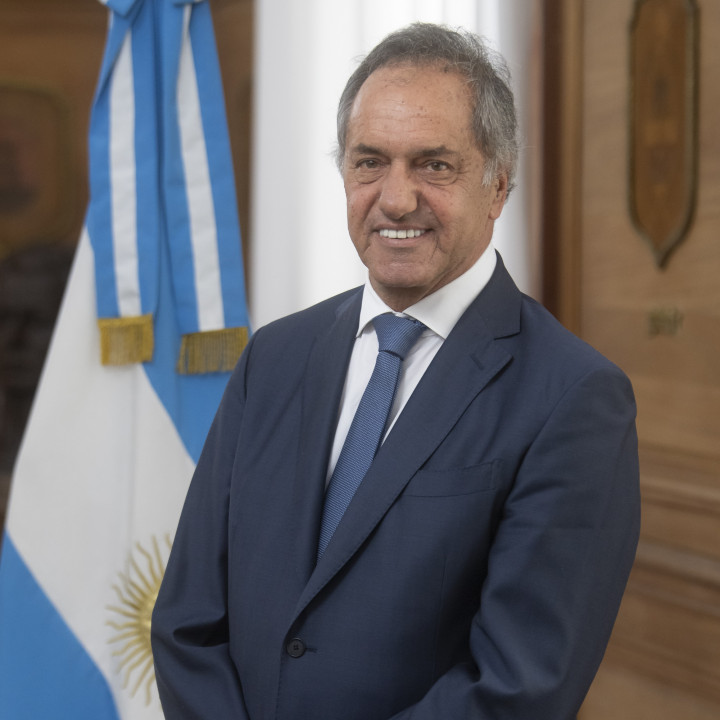
- Official portrait, 2024

Secretary of Tourism, Environment and Sports
- Incumbent
- Assumed office 30 January 2024
- President: Javier Milei
- Preceded by: Matías Lammens (Note: as Minister of Tourism and Sports); Juan Cabandié (Note: as Minister of Environment and Sustainable Development)

Ambassador of Argentina to Brazil
- In office 5 September 2022 – 30 January 2024
- President: Alberto Fernández; Javier Milei
- Preceded by: Himself
- In office 29 June 2020 – 15 June 2022
- President: Alberto Fernández
- Preceded by: Carlos Magariños
- Succeeded by: Himself

Minister of Productive Development
- In office 15 June 2022 – 3 August 2022
- President: Alberto Fernández
- Preceded by: Matías Kulfas
- Succeeded by: Sergio Massa (as Minister of Economy)

Governor of Buenos Aires
- In office 10 December 2007 – 10 December 2015
- Vice Governor: Alberto Balestrini; Gabriel Mariotto
- Preceded by: Felipe Solá
- Succeeded by: María Eugenia Vidal

33rd Vice President of Argentina
- In office 25 May 2003 – 10 December 2007
- President: Néstor Kirchner
- Preceded by: Carlos Álvarez
- Succeeded by: Julio Cobos

President of the Justicialist Party
- In office 27 October 2010 – 9 May 2014
- Preceded by: Néstor Kirchner
- Succeeded by: Eduardo Fellner
- In office 29 June 2009 – 11 November 2009
- Preceded by: Néstor Kirchner
- Succeeded by: Néstor Kirchner

National Deputy
- In office 10 December 2017 – 10 December 2019
- Constituency: Buenos Aires
- In office 10 December 1997 – 23 December 2001
- Constituency: City of Buenos Aires

Personal details
- Born: Daniel Osvaldo Scioli; 13 January 1957 (age 69) Buenos Aires, Argentina
- Party: Justicialist Party
- Other political affiliations: Justicialist Agreement (1999–2003); Front for Victory (2003–2017); Citizen's Unity (2017–2019); Everyone's Front (2019–2023); Freedom Advances (2023-present)
- Spouse: Karina Rabolini (m. 1991; div. 2015)
- Domestic partner: Gisella Berger (2016–2020)
- Children: 2
- Education: Argentine University of Enterprise
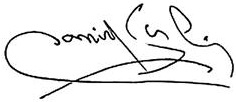
- Signature
- Website: Official website

Daniel Osvaldo Scioli (Spanish: [daˈnjel osˈβaldo ˈsjoli] or [ˈʃoli], Italian: [ˈʃɔːli]; born 13 January 1957) is an Argentine politician, businessman, and former sportsman. He is serving as the Secretary of Tourism, Environment and Sports since January 2024. He was Vice President of Argentina from 2003 to 2007 and Governor of Buenos Aires Province from 2007 to 2015. From September 2022 to January 2024 and previously from June 2020 to June 2022, he was Argentina's ambassador to Brazil.

Scioli served two tenures as president of the Justicialist Party. He was the candidate to the presidency for the Front for Victory ticket in the 2015 Argentine general election, and lost to Mauricio Macri in a runoff election. From June to September 2022, he briefly served as Minister of Production in the cabinet of Alberto Fernández.

== Early life and family ==
Scioli was born in Villa Crespo, Buenos Aires. He spent his first years in a middle class home located at the corner of Corrientes and Humboldt. His grandfather ran an electrical hardware store, which over time grew into a store selling electrical appliances that was to become the family business. Scioli has described himself as a loyal man devoted to his stable and intimate circle, and an understanding but demanding father.

In 1975, his brother José Scioli was kidnapped by a cell of the Montoneros guerrilla group. Scioli, then aged 18, carried out the negotiations with the kidnappers to free his brother. José was released in exchange for a cash payment by their father. He was married to former model and entrepreneur Karina Rabolini and has an extramarital daughter. Although Scioli refused to recognize his daughter, he was eventually forced by law to recognize her. She was then accepted by Scioli as his daughter when she was 18 years old. Regarding this issue, he says, "It helped me to grow and to give me peace of mind".

== Education ==
Scioli attended Colegio Ward's primary school in Villa Sarmiento, where he lived until he was 17 years old. For his secondary schooling, he graduated from the Escuela Superior de Comercio Carlos Pellegrini with a diploma in commercial expertise, having attained one of the three best grade averages. He started studies in marketing at the Universidad Argentina de la Empresa (U.A.D.E.) in Buenos Aires; in October 2015 he graduated finishing his final exams. Scioli and Ricardo Orosco, head of the UADE, were denounced for a possible degree forgery, as several topics of study approved by him are no longer part of the scheduled studies.

== Sports career ==
His interest in sports began at the Villa Crespo club. He took part in swimming, tennis, basketball and a form of badminton, representing his city in each. His passion for offshore powerboat racing took off when a friend invited him for a ride in a powerboat. Some time later he competed in his first Offshore Powerboat race in Mar del Plata, in which he finished last. "This made me very angry, so I decided to train until I started winning, and finally ended up as the world champion," he states. Scioli started to compete in offshore powerboat racing in 1986 in 1987 he joined the Italian powerboat designer, builder and engineer Fabio Buzzi who ran FB Design, one of the most successful powerboat racing teams in the world.

On 4 December 1989, Scioli lost his right arm in an accident while racing on the Paraná River in the 1000 km Delta Argentino race. A wave produced by an oil tanker is believed to have overturned his boat. A fitted prosthesis enabled Scioli to pursue his love of offshore powerboat racing. Even with this handicap he won many offshore powerboat racing championships in various categories. On board La Gran Argentina, a Fabio Buzzi-designed FB 55, Daniel Scioli was a three-time winner of the World Superboat USA Championship and captured 4 European titles. The boat's hull was modified in 2000 into a long-distance record setter. Scioli went on to set the Miami-Nassau-Miami record with an average speed of 100 mph.

== Business career ==
In the field of business his activity was linked to the electrical appliances market. In 1991, the Swedish company Electrolux, which had left the Argentine market on account of the country's instability, nominated him as the agent of its brand for Argentina. In 1994 Scioli encouraged the firm to re-establish in Argentina, an effort which gave rise to Electrolux Argentina, of which he became the director, a post he held until 1997.

== Political career ==
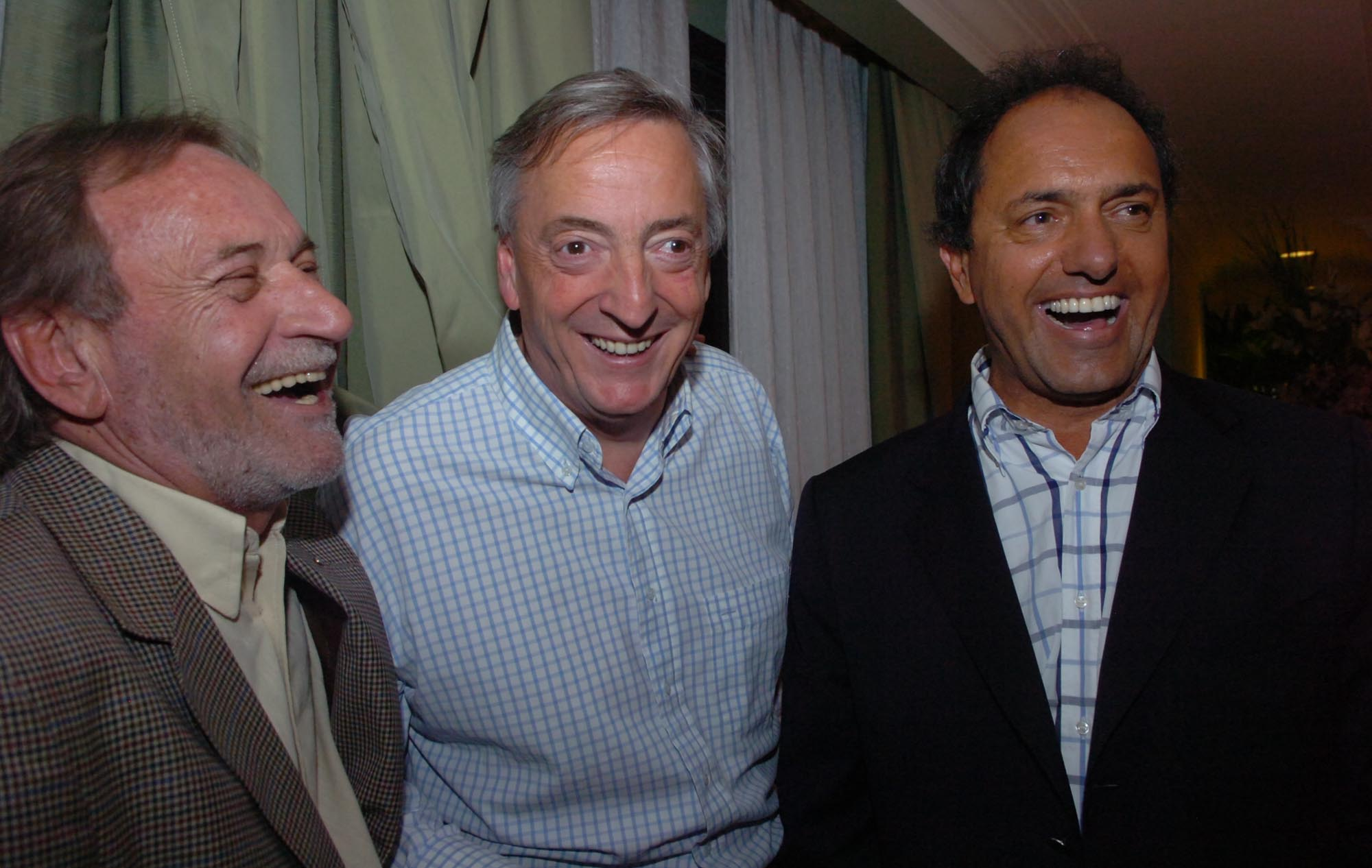
Scioli's running mate Alberto Balestrini, President Kirchner, and Scioli celebrate the victory of the Scioli-Balestrini ticket in the 2007 race for the Governor of the Province of Buenos Aires, the nation's largest.

Scioli's political career took off in 1997, when he ran for a seat in the Argentine Chamber of Deputies on behalf of the Justicialist Party in the City of Buenos Aires. He was elected and on December 10 of that year he became a Deputy in the Argentine Congress. He was nominated president of the Sports Committee of the House for a two-year tenure, a nomination that was renewed for another two-year period on the basis of a unanimous vote. Having been re-elected as a Deputy in 2001, in December 2001 he became a minister as the Secretary of Sports and Tourism.

In 2003, the formula Kirchner-Scioli running on the Front for Victory ticket won the presidential election. Thus Scioli became Argentina's vice-president and the President of the Senate. In 2007, upon Néstor Kirchner's retirement as president, Daniel Scioli was elected Governor of the Province of Buenos Aires, considered one of the most influential political jobs in Argentina. Following disappointing results for the ruling Front for Victory (FPV) in the 2009 Argentine legislative election, Scioli replaced Kirchner as President of the Justicialist Party (to which the FPV belongs).

Scioli was the FPV presidential candidate in the 2015 Argentine general election, and was endorsed by incumbent President Cristina Fernández de Kirchner. The initial polls pointed him as a favourite, with some predicting he would win enough votes to win outright and avoid a ballotage. However, he only narrowly won the first round, forcing him into a ballotage against Buenos Aires mayor Mauricio Macri. The ballotage round was held on November 22. Scioli narrowly lost to Macri, and conceded the race with 70% of the votes counted.

In March 2020, President Alberto Fernández nominated him to be the new Ambassador of Argentina to Brazil. The Senate accepted his nomination on 26 June 2020. In June 2022, the government of Alberto Fernández offered him the position of Minister of Productive Development after the previous minister, Matías Kulfas, resigned over a scandal related to the bidding to build the Néstor Kirchner gas pipeline. A position which he ultimately accepted. Scioli would end up leaving the Ministry of Productive Development on 3 August of the same year, 43 days after being appointed to the office. After leaving the Ministry, he returned to his previous role as the Ambassador to Brazil on 9 September 2022.

After the 2023 general election the government of President Javier Milei would retain him as the Ambassador to Brazil. On 30 January 2024, Scioli was designated by the government of President Javier Milei to become the Secretary of Tourism, Environment and Sport. Scioli is still a member of the Justicialist Party, which has drawn criticism from Kirchnerist leaders.

== Electoral career ==
=== Executive ===
Electoral history of Daniel Scioli
Election	Office	List	Votes			Result	Ref.
Election	Office	List	Total	%	P.	Result	Ref.
2007	Governor of Buenos Aires	Front for Victory	3,376,795	48.24%	1st	Elected	
2011	Governor of Buenos Aires	Front for Victory	4,288,400	55.18%	1st	Elected	
2015 1-R	President of Argentina	Front for Victory	9,338,490	37.08%	1st	→ Round 2	
2015 2-R	President of Argentina	Front for Victory	12,309,575	48.66%	2nd	Not elected	

=== Legislative ===
Electoral history of Daniel Scioli
Election	Office	List	#	District	Votes			Result	Ref.
Election	Office	List	#	District	Total	%	P.	Result	Ref.
1997	National Deputy	Justicialist Party	2	City of Buenos Aires	345,466	17.99%	2nd (Note: Presented on an electoral list. The data shown represents the share of the vote the entire party/alliance received in that constituency.)	Elected	
2001	National Deputy	Unity for Buenos Aires	1	City of Buenos Aires	156,104	11.68%	3rd	Elected	
2009	National Deputy	Front for Victory	2	Buenos Aires Province	2,418,104	32.18%	2nd	Elected (Note: Never took office.)	
2017	National Deputy	Unidad Ciudadana	5	Buenos Aires Province	3,383,114	36.28%	2nd	Elected	

Political offices
Preceded by Carlos Álvarez	Vice President of Argentina; 2003–2007	Succeeded by Julio Cobos
Preceded by Felipe Solá	Governor of Buenos Aires; 2007–2015	Succeeded by María Eugenia Vidal
Preceded by Matías Kulfas	Minister of Productive Development; June 2022–August 2022	Succeeded by Sergio Massa as Minister of Economy
Diplomatic posts
Preceded by Carlos Magariños	Ambassador of Argentina to Brazil; 2020–2022	Vacant
Vacant	Ambassador of Argentina to Brazil; 2022–present	Incumbent
Party political offices
Preceded by Néstor Kirchner	President of the Justicialist Party; January 2009–November 2009	Succeeded by Néstor Kirchner
Preceded by Néstor Kirchner	President of the Justicialist Party; 2010–2014	Succeeded by Eduardo Fellner
