= Teresita Luna =

Argentine politician

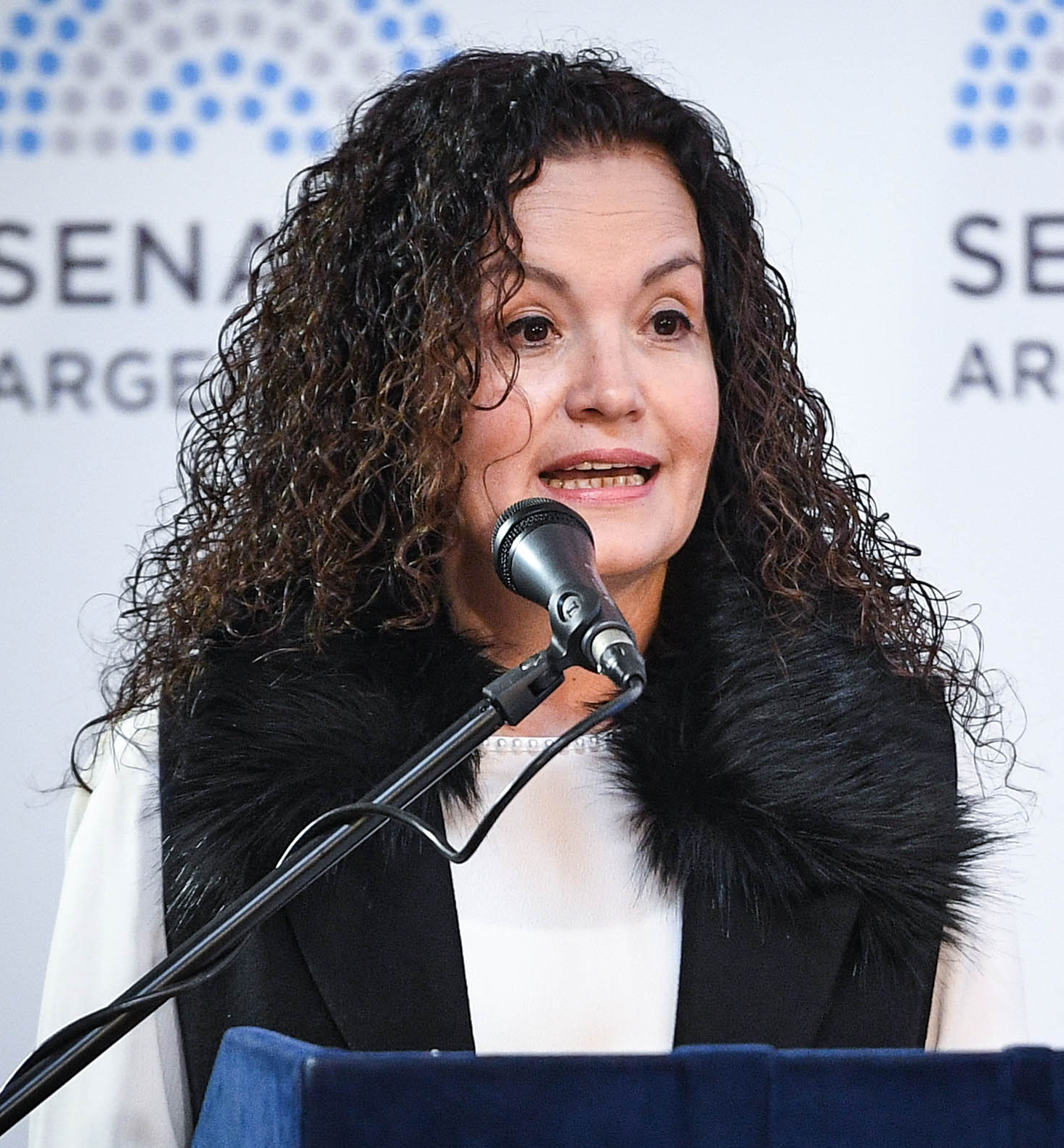

Provincial Deputy of La Rioja
- Incumbent
- Assumed office 10 December 2021
- Constituency: Capital Department
- In office 10 December 2005 – 10 December 2007
- Constituency: Capital Department

National Senator
- In office 10 December 2011 – 9 December 2017
- Constituency: La Rioja

Vice Governor of La Rioja
- In office 10 December 2007 – 10 December 2011
- Governor: Luis Beder Herrera
- Preceded by: Luis Beder Herrera
- Succeeded by: Sergio Casas

Personal details
- Born: 19 February 1964 (age 62) Mendoza, Argentina
- Party: Justicialist Party (until 2016); Evita Movement (2016–2017); Norte Grande Movement (2017–present)
- Other political affiliations: Front for Victory (2003–2017); Juntos por el Cambio (2019–present)

Mirtha María Teresita Luna (born 19 February 1964) is an Argentine politician. Formerly a member of the Justicialist Party, she served as Vice Governor of La Rioja Province from 2007 to 2011, and later as a National Senator for La Rioja from 2011 to 2017. In 2019, she left the Justicialist Party and became part of the Cambiemos coalition.

Since 2021, she has been a member of the provincial legislature of La Rioja, a position she previously held from 2005 to 2007.

== Early life and education ==
Luna was born in Mendoza on 19 February 1964, and grew up in Chamical, La Rioja. She studied to become a literature professor at the Instituto Superior de Formación Docente Albino Sánchez Barros, in the City of La Rioja.

== Political career ==
Luna became a member of the Justicialist Party (PJ) in 1983. She served in a number of positions in the party, most notably as secretary of women's affairs of the National Party Council from 2007 to 2014, and national secretary of the party from 2008 to 2012.

In 2002, she was appointed as undersecretary of human development and family affairs of La Rioja Province, during the governorship of Ángel Maza. Later, in 2005, she was elected to the Legislature of La Rioja for the Capital Department. In the 2007 provincial elections, Luna was the vice-gubernatorial candidate in the Justicialist Party ticket, as the running mate to Luis Beder Herrera. The Beder Herrera–Luna ticket won with over 42% of the vote. She was the first female vice governor of La Rioja.

=== National Senator ===
Upon the end of her term as vice governor, in 2011, she ran for one of La Rioja's three seats in the National Senate on the Front for Victory list, as the first candidate in the Front for Victory (FPV) list. The FPV was the second-most voted list in the province, with 33.76% of the vote, granting Luna the sole minority seat as per the Senate's limited voting system. She formed part of the PJ–Front for Victory parliamentary bloc, and presided the Senate commission on tourism.

In 2016, Luna joined the Evita Movement. Having lost the Justicialist Party's support, she ran for re-election in the 2017 legislative election as part of the Norte Grande Movement, a minor provincial party. She landed a distant third place, with 6.9% of the vote, trailing the Cambiemos and Justicialist Party lists. A few days before the general election, she withdrew her candidacy, citing "lobbying" from the provincial PJ as her main cause.

=== Later career ===
In the 2019 provincial elections, she once again sought the vice-governorship as the running mate of Julio Martínez in the Juntos por el Cambio list. The Martínez–Luna ticket received less than 31% of the vote, losing against the Justicialist Party ticket of Ricardo Quintela and Florencia López. Following her defeat, in December 2019, she was appointed as secretary of government of the La Rioja municipal government by mayor Olga Inés Brizuela y Doria.

In the 2021 provincial elections, Luna ran for a seat in the provincial legislature as part of Vamos La Rioja (Juntos por el Cambio) in the Capital Department. She was elected with 22.29% of the vote alongside Gustavo Galván.
