= Martín Menem =

Argentine lawyer, businessman and politician (born 1975)

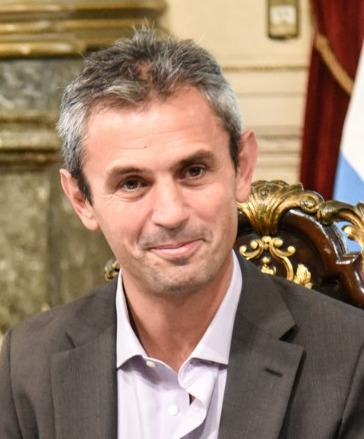
- Menem in 2023

President of the Chamber of Deputies
- Incumbent
- Assumed office 10 December 2023
- Preceded by: Cecilia Moreau

National Deputy
- Incumbent
- Assumed office 10 December 2023
- Constituency: La Rioja

Provincial Deputy of La Rioja
- In office 10 December 2021 – 7 December 2023
- Constituency: Capital Department

Personal details
- Born: Martín Alexis Menem; 19 April 1975 (age 51) La Rioja, Argentina
- Party: La Libertad Avanza (2024–present) (Note: Member of the coalition of the same name since 2021)
- Other political affiliations: Union of the Democratic Centre (formerly)
- Children: 2
- Parent: Eduardo Menem (father)
- Relatives: Carlos Menem (uncle)

Martín Alexis Menem (born 19 April 1975) is an Argentine lawyer, businessman, and politician, elected national deputy for La Rioja. He served as provincial deputy of La Rioja between 2021 and 2023. He was appointed to preside over the presidency of the Chamber of Deputies as of December 10, 2023.

== Early life ==
Martín was born on 19 April 1975, in the Argentine province of La Rioja, to a family of Syrian descent. He is the son of the former senator, Eduardo Menem, and the social worker, Susana Cristina Valente, he is the nephew of former president Carlos Menem. At the age of fifteen, he moved to the City of Buenos Aires.

== Career ==
In 1997, after studying law at the Universidad de Belgrano, he obtained his law degree. He later founded "Gentech", a dietary supplement company.

In May 2002, he was kidnapped in the Buenos Aires neighborhood of Núñez and released three hours later in Bernal, Quilmes district, after paying a ransom of 1,800 pesos. According to judicial and police sources, Menem was kidnapped along with three friends by eight men in three vehicles. However, both Menem and his family denied the incident, insisting that nothing strange had happened.

=== Politics ===
He entered politics in 2021 with the help of La Libertad Avanza, the coalition led by Javier Milei, with whom he held a joint electoral event, this being the only one carried out by him outside the City of Buenos Aires.

He was elected provincial deputy with 11.55% of the votes, in the 2021 provincial elections, with the Union of the Democratic Center for the Capital department (UCEDE).

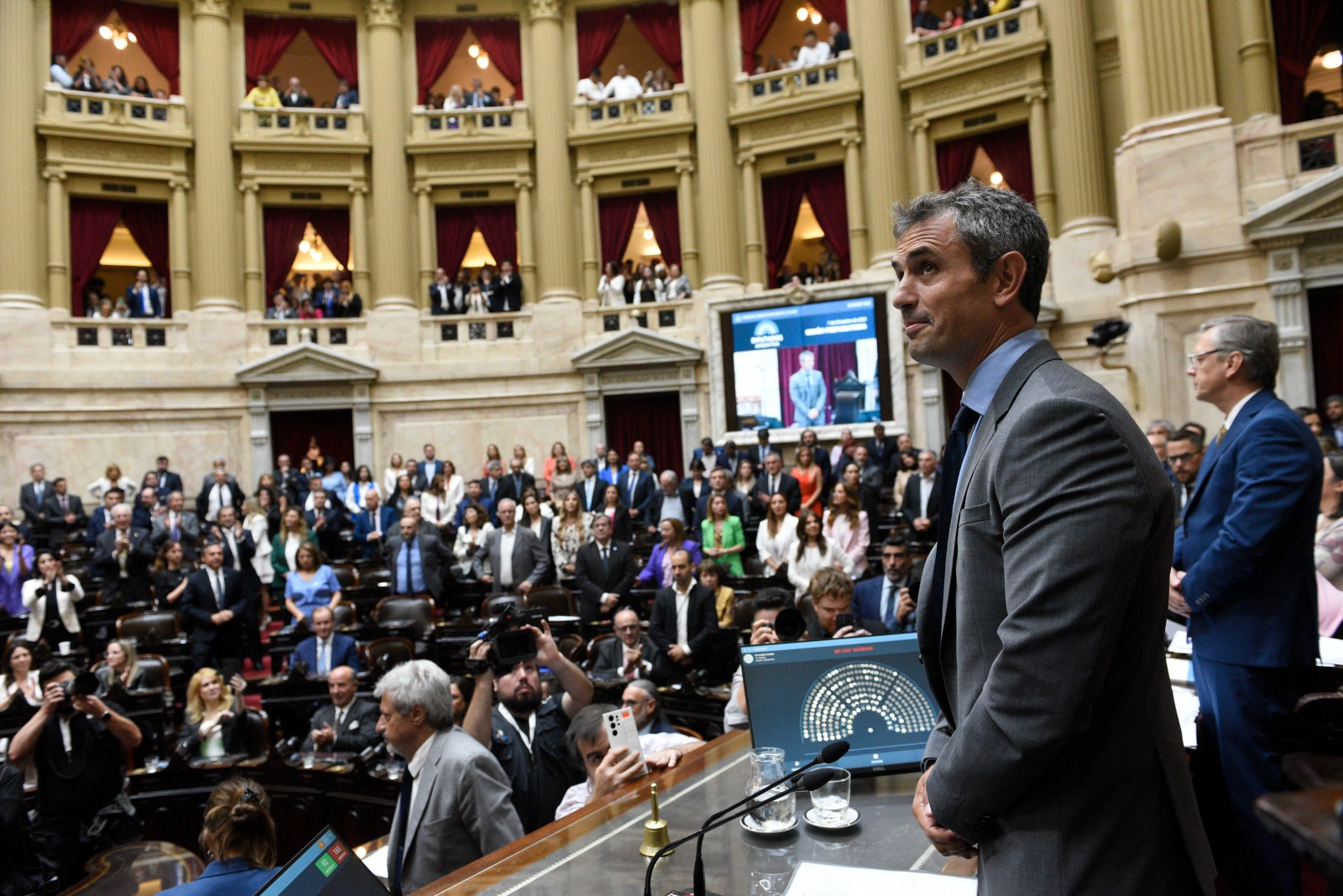
Menem after being elected president of the Chamber of Deputies of the Nation.

He was a candidate for governor of La Rioja, in the provincial elections of May 2023. He was defeated, coming third with 14.70% of the votes, against the Peronist candidate Ricardo Quintela who obtained 52.63% of the votes. His application generated controversies in the province, highlighting that he did not live there for over 30 years.

He was elected national deputy in the 2023 legislative elections, representing La Rioja, for La Libertad Avanza (which had been founded as a provincial party in said district) with 38.01% of the votes. Although, on 7 December, he was elected as president of the Chamber of Deputies by all the parliamentary blocs, with the exception of the Left Front bloc, which abstained, as it traditionally does.

== Electoral history ==
=== Executive ===
Electoral history of Martín Menem
Election	Office	List	Votes			Result	Ref.
Election	Office	List	Total	%	P.	Result	Ref.
2023	Governor of La Rioja	La Libertad Avanza	28,926	14.70%	3rd	Not elected	

=== Legislative ===
Electoral history of Martín Menem
Election	Office	List	#	District	Votes			Result	Ref.
Election	Office	List	#	District	Total	%	P.	Result	Ref.
2021	Provincial Deputy	Union of the Democratic Centre	1	Capital Department	15,810	11.55%	3rd (Note: Presented on an electoral list. The data shown represents the share of the vote the entire party/alliance received in that constituency.)	Elected	
2023	National Deputy	La Libertad Avanza	1	La Rioja Province	85,794	38.01%	2nd	Elected	

== Notes ==
Political offices
Preceded by Cecilia Moreau	President of the Chamber of Deputies; 2023–present	Incumbent
