= Julio Martínez (Argentine politician) =

Argentine politician

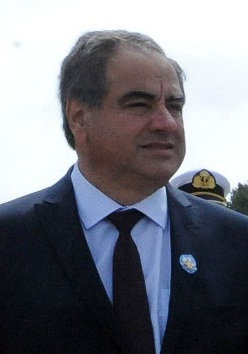
- Martínez in 2017

National Senator
- In office 10 December 2017 – 10 December 2023
- Constituency: La Rioja

Minister of Defense
- In office 10 December 2015 – 17 July 2017
- President: Mauricio Macri
- Preceded by: Agustín Rossi
- Succeeded by: Oscar Aguad

National Deputy
- In office 10 December 2009 – 10 December 2015
- Constituency: La Rioja
- In office 10 December 2003 – 10 December 2007
- Constituency: La Rioja

Provincial Deputy of La Rioja
- In office 10 December 1999 – 10 December 2003

Personal details
- Born: 23 March 1962 (age 64) Chilecito, Argentina
- Party: Radical Civic Union
- Other political affiliations: Juntos por el Cambio (since 2015)
- Education: National University of Córdoba

Julio César Martínez (born 23 March 1962) is an Argentine politician of the Radical Civic Union (UCR). Among other posts, he served as a National Senator for La Rioja from 2017 to 2023, as Minister of Defense under President Mauricio Macri (2015–2017), as a National Deputy (2009–2015), and as a member of the Legislature of La Rioja (1999–2003).

== Early life ==
Martínez was born on 23 March 1962 in Chilecito, La Rioja Province. He studied agricultural engineering at the National University of Córdoba, graduating with a licenciatura in 1986.

== Political career ==
Martínez became politically active in the Radical Civic Union (UCR). In 1999, he was elected to the Legislature of La Rioja. Later, in the 2003 general election, he ran for one of La Rioja's seats in the National Chamber of Deputies as part of the UCR list; he was elected with 30.39% as the only UCR deputy from La Rioja.

As part of the Chamber of Deputies, he was a member of the parliamentary commission on national defense. He was a vocal critic of many of President Néstor Kirchner's defense policies, such as the modernisation of the FMA IA-63 Pampa and the purchase of new aircraft for the Argentine Air Force, as well as the appointment of César Milani as General of the Argentine Army's Estado Mayor General.

He ran for re-election in the 2007 legislative election, but the UCR list received less than 22% of the vote, not enough for Martínez (or any other candidates in the list) to make it past the D'Hondt cut. He would run again in 2009, this time as part of the Social and Civic Agreement list, and he was elected. He was re-elected for a third term in the 2013 legislative election, as the first candidate in the Frente Cívico Riojano (FCR) list. Both lists came very close in the voting, with a difference of merely 1,000 votes between them.

=== Gubernatorial candidacies ===
Martínez first ran for governor of La Rioja in the 2011 provincial elections. As the Civic Front for Change candidate, he sought to challenge the re-election bid of Justicialist Party governor Luis Beder Herrera. Beder Herrera won the re-election with 67.2% of the votes against Martínez's 19.6%.

He tried to once again run for governor in the 2015 provincial elections, this time backed by the Cambiemos coalition (including Republican Proposal, the Civic Coalition ARI and the Socialist Party). However, he once again fell short and lost with 39.32% of the votes against the PJ candidate Sergio Casas's 56.74%.

=== Defense minister ===
On 10 December 2015, following the election of Mauricio Macri as President of Argentina, Martínez was appointed as Minister of Defense in the incoming cabinet, taking over from Agustín Rossi. One of his first acts as minister was Martínez shutting down plans for a state-commissioned revamp of Air Force planes.

In June 2016, on Martínez's orders, criminals sentenced for crimes against humanity (namely those who participated in the 1976–1983 military dictatorship) were once again allowed to receive medical treatment at military hospitals, reverting a resolution passed by former minister Rossi. Martínez also supported granting dictatorship collaborators home arrest due to their advanced age.

His administration saw a general setback for military development in Argentina, as part of the Macri administration's austerity policies. The renovation project for the Puerto Belgrano Naval Base was paralyzed, as was the renovation of ARA Santa Cruz, one of the Argentine Navy's three (at the time) submarines, and a project to produce the second series of six radars built by Fabricaciones Militares and INVAP was scrapped altogether.

=== National senator ===
In the 2017 legislative election, Martínez ran for one of La Rioja's three seats in the National Senate, as the first candidate in the Cambiemos list. His list ran again the list headed by former president and longtime peronist senator Carlos Menem. In what was described as an upset, Martínez's list came first, with 48.02% of the vote, against Menem's 45.50%. Martínez was thus elected for the majority.

As a national senator, he formed part of the parliamentary commissions on Administrative and Municipal Affairs, Budgets and Treasury, National Defense, Agriculture and Livestock, and the Bicameral Commission on Social Security Funds Accountability. He also presided the commission on Rights and Guarantees. He was an opponent of the 2020 Voluntary Interruption of Pregnancy Bill, which legalised abortion in Argentina.

== Personal life ==
Martínez is married to Laura Rebeca Waidatt, with whom he has three children.

== Electoral history ==
=== Executive ===
Electoral history of Julio Martínez
Election	Office	List	Votes			Result	Ref.
Election	Office	List	Total	%	P.	Result	Ref.
2011	Governor of La Rioja	Civic Front for Change	32,069	19.64%	2nd	Not elected	
2015	Governor of La Rioja	La Rioja Civic Front	80,235	40.70%	2nd	Not elected	

=== Legislative ===
Electoral history of Julio Martínez
Election	Office	List	#	District	Votes			Result	Ref.
Election	Office	List	#	District	Total	%	P.	Result	Ref.
2003	National Deputy	Labour and Production	1	La Rioja Province	38,721	30.39%	2nd (Note: Presented on an electoral list. The data shown represents the share of the vote the entire party/alliance received in that constituency.)	Elected	
2007	National Deputy	Civic and Social Front	1	La Rioja Province	24,263	21.60%	2nd	Not elected	
2009	National Deputy	Civic and Social Front	1	La Rioja Province	50,528	32.21%	2nd	Elected	
2013	National Deputy	La Rioja Civic Force	1	La Rioja Province	87,245	46.53%	2nd	Elected	
2017	National Senator	Cambiemos	1	La Rioja Province	91,307	56.96%	1st	Elected	
