= Capitán Vicente Almandos Almonacid =

Vicente Almandos Almonacid
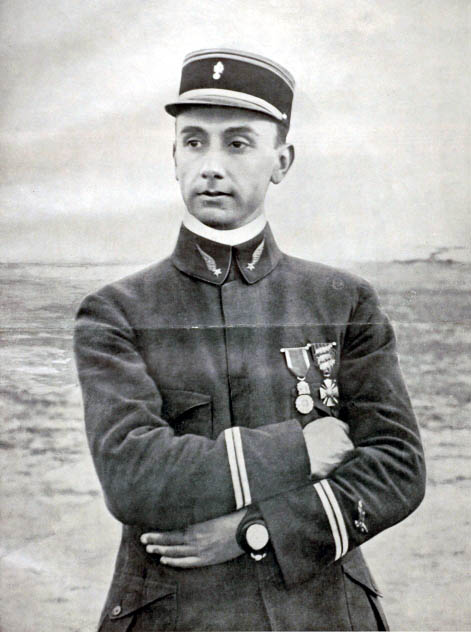
- Almonacid wearing the uniform of the Aéronautique Militaire.
- Born: December 24, 1882; Anguinán, La Rioja, Argentina
- Died: December 16, 1953 (aged 70); Buenos Aires, Argentina
- Other name: The Riojan Condor
- Education: University of Buenos Aires
- Known for: Founded Aeroposta Argentina
- Spouses: Dolores Güiraldes (div. 1932): Susana Noceti Seeber
- Relatives: Governor of La Rioja Vicente Almandos Almonacid (father); Esmeralda Castro Barros (mother)
- Awards: Legión de Honor (France), Military Medal
- Aviation career
- Famous flights: First night flight across the Andes
- Air force: French Air and Space Force
- Battles: World War I

Vicente Almandos Almonacid (Anguinán, La Rioja, Argentina, 24 December 1882 – Buenos Aires, Argentina, 16 December 1953) was an Argentine engineer, diplomat, and aviator who participated in the First World War as pilot of the French Air Force.

He was co-founder and technical manager of the airline Aeroposta Argentina, a subsidiary of the French firm Aéropostale and the precursor of Aerolíneas Argentinas. He was the first person to cross the Andes by air at night, and was the architect of most of the air routes of Aeroposta. As a diplomat, he presided over the Argentine consulate of Boulogne-sur-Mer from 1938 to 1945.

In recognition of his achievements, in France he was awarded several honors, including the Legion of Honor and the Military Medal.

The La Rioja Airport It has that name in honor of him.

== Biography ==
=== First years ===
He was born in the town of San Miguel de Anguinán, located in La Rioja Province near the city of Chilecito, on 24 December 1882. His father, Vicente Almandos Almonacid (es), was a cattle and mining entrepreneur in Famatina who held the position of Governor of La Rioja between 1877 and 1880. His mother, Esmeralda Castro Barros, came, like her husband, from a family of unitary tradition. His paternal grandfather was Colonel Lino Almandos (es), who fought against Chacho Peñaloza (es) and Felipe Varela (es) during the Argentine Civil Wars.

The family business prospered until the financial crisis of 1890 severely damaged mining activity and led the family business to bankruptcy. His father died the following year. These two episodes motivated his mother to move with her six-year-old son to Buenos Aires, in search of better conditions. In the Argentine capital, Vicente studied at the National College. He entered the Faculty of Exact and Natural Sciences of the University of Buenos Aires, in the engineering field.

=== Training as a pilot and World War I ===
After completing his university studies, and inspired by his faith in scientific progress and in the context of the Argentine Centennial and the Belle Époque, he designed and undertook the construction of a small airplane that he called "aeromobile." Faced with the impossibility of developing his project in Argentina and with the aim of becoming a pilot and increasing his training in engineering, he moved to Paris at the end of 1912, where the first aviation school in the world had been founded a few years earlier. In the French capital, he had the opportunity to exchange views with Gustave Eiffel, the man responsible for the construction of the Eiffel Tower and the internal structure of the Statue of Liberty.

Almonacid knew how to fly only simple airplanes. That is why after a short stay in Paris, he decided to go to the Farman Aerodrome, located near Versailles, to be credentialed as a professional pilot. It was difficult for him to understand his teachers initially because he did not speak French, but he gradually improved. In 1914, the Aeroclub of France awarded him a diploma under the authority of the French government.

== See also ==
- Aeroposta Argentina
- Teodoro Fels (es)
