= Ricardo Quintela =

Argentine politician

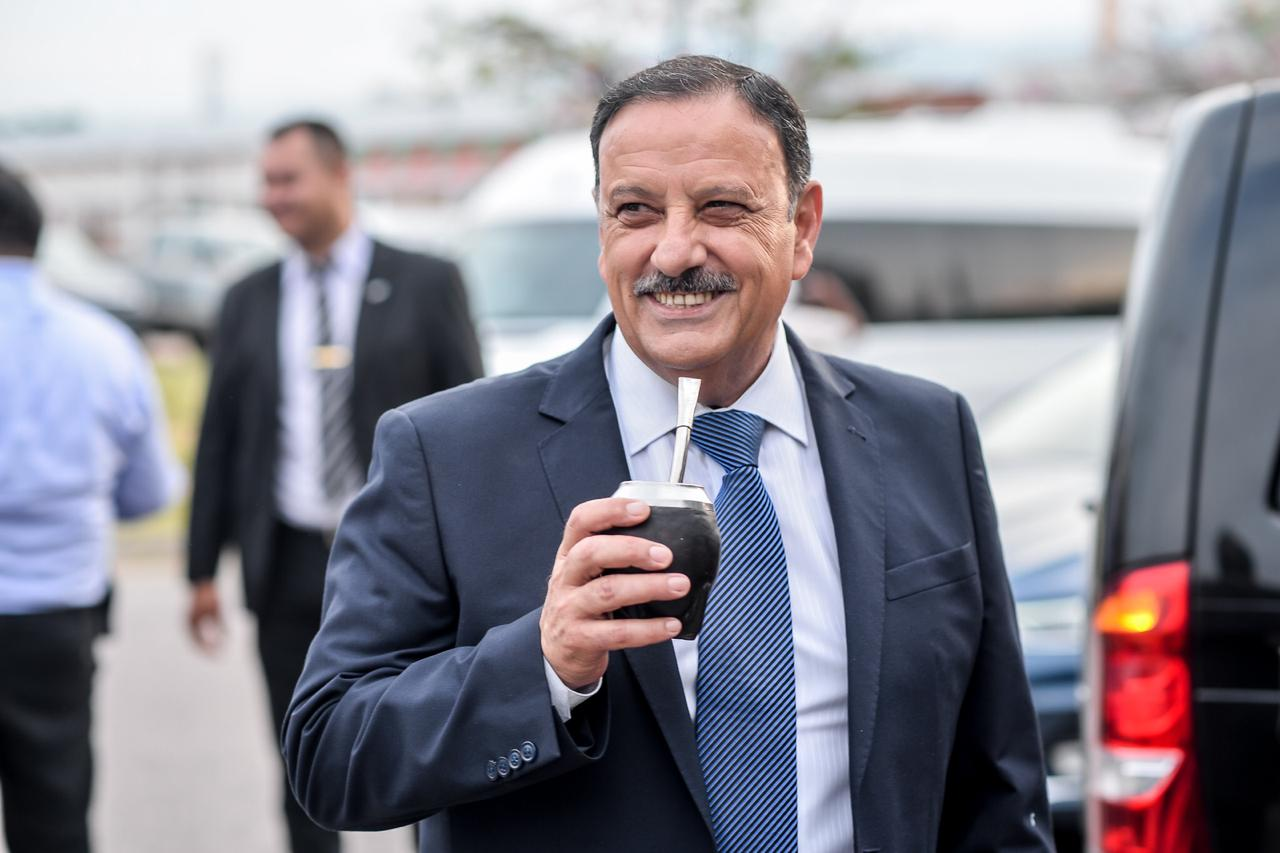

Governor of La Rioja
- Incumbent
- Assumed office 11 December 2019
- Vice Governor: Florencia López (2019–2023); Teresita Madera (2023–present)
- Preceded by: Sergio Casas

Provincial Legislator of La Rioja
- In office 10 December 2017 – 24 November 2019
- Constituency: Capital Department
- In office 10 December 1993 – 10 December 1997
- Constituency: Capital Department

Mayor of La Rioja
- In office 10 December 2003 – 10 December 2015
- Preceded by: Luis Agost Carreño
- Succeeded by: Alberto Paredes Urquiza

National Deputy
- In office 10 December 1997 – 10 December 2003
- Constituency: La Rioja

Personal details
- Born: 16 March 1960 (age 66) La Rioja, Argentina
- Party: Justicialist Party
- Other political affiliations: Frente de Todos (2019–2023); Union for the Homeland (2023–present)

Ricardo Clemente Quintela (born 16 March 1960) is an Argentine Justicialist Party politician who is currently Governor of La Rioja Province, since 11 December 2019.

He was previously Mayor of the City of La Rioja from 2003 to 2015, as well as a member of the provincial legislature during two non-consecutive terms and a National Deputy from 1997 to 2003.

Since 2020, Quintela has been the president of the La Rioja chapter of the Justicialist Party.

== Political career ==
Quintela's political activism began early in his life in the Peronist Youth; he was appointed president of the La Rioja Capital Department Peronist Youth in 1986. In 1993 he was elected to the Legislature of La Rioja for a four-year term, representing the Capital Department. Following the end of this term, he was elected to the Argentine Chamber of Deputies for La Rioja, serving a full four-year term until 2003.

From 2003 to 2015 he was intendente (mayor) of the City of La Rioja. In 2017 he was elected again to the Provincial Chamber of Deputies, representing the Capital Department as well.

In 2019, then-governor Sergio Casas attempted to hold a referendum to modify the provincial constitution and allow further re-elections; the attempt was blocked by the Supreme Court of Argentina, and so Casas nominated Quintela, a close ally, to succeed him in the post. Quintela ran in the 2019 election in a three-way race against a fellow Justicialist Party candidate and former governor, Luis Beder Herrera, as well as Juntos por el Cambio candidate Julio Martínez; Quintela won with 45% of the vote and was sworn in on 11 December 2019.

On 13 October 2020, Quintela was elected as president of the La Rioja provincial chapter of the Justicialist Party, following the resignation of Casas from the post.

== Personal life ==
Quintela is nicknamed "El Gitano". He has five children: Emilse, Christian, Exequiel, Jerónimo and Guadalupe. His sister, Teresa Quintela, is also active in politics and served as a national senator for La Rioja. His ex-wife Gabriela Pedrali is a National Deputy for La Rioja.

== Electoral history ==
=== Executive ===
Electoral history of Ricardo Quintela
Election	Office	List	Votes			Result	Ref.
Election	Office	List	Total	%	P.	Result	Ref.
2019	Governor of La Rioja	Frente de Todos	95,115	44.89%	1st	Elected	
2023	Governor of La Rioja	Unión por la Patria	103,549	52.63%	1st	Elected	

=== Legislative ===
Electoral history of Ricardo Quintela
Election	Office	List	#	District	Votes			Result	Ref.
Election	Office	List	#	District	Total	%	P.	Result	Ref.
1993	Provincial Legislator	La Rioja Justicialist Front	1	La Rioja Province	63,475	69.21%	1st (Note: Presented on an electoral list. The data shown represents the share of the vote the entire party/alliance received in that constituency.)	Elected	
1997	National Deputy	Justicialist Party	1	La Rioja Province	68,480	62.01%	1st	Elected	
2001	National Deputy	Justicialist Party	1	La Rioja Province	68,657	57.09%	1st	Elected	
2017	Provincial Legislator	Justicialist Party	1	Capital Department		25.01%	1st	Elected	

Political offices
Preceded by Sergio Casas	Governor of La Rioja; 2019–present	Incumbent
