= Termas de Santa Teresita =

- Village
- Interactive map of Termas de Santa Teresita
- Coordinates: 28.5918232°S 66.5546295°W
- Country: Argentina
- Province: La Rioja Province
- Department: Arauco

Population
  - Total: 124

Termas de Santa Teresita is a village near Estación Mazán in Arauco Department, La Rioja Province in northwestern Argentina.

Arauco is 33 km west, Estación Mazán is 10 km south.

In 2022 it had 124 inhabitants

It stands in the Salado River Basin (along with other colonies such as Bañado de los Pantanos, Aimogasta, Chilca and Villa Mazán).

A railway line (one of the Belgrano lines) used to come all the way there - and end there.
