= Florencia López =

Argentine politician

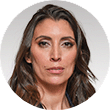

National Senator
- Incumbent
- Assumed office 10 December 2023
- Constituency: La Rioja

Vice Governor of La Rioja
- In office 11 December 2019 – 10 December 2023
- Governor: Ricardo Quintela
- Preceded by: Néstor Bosetti
- Succeeded by: Teresita Madera

Mayor of Arauco
- In office 10 December 2015 – 10 December 2019
- Preceded by: Gustavo Minuzzi
- Succeeded by: Virginia López

Provincial Legislator of La Rioja
- In office 10 December 2011 – 10 December 2015
- Constituency: Arauco Department

Personal details
- Born: 26 February 1980 (age 46) La Rioja, Argentina
- Party: Justicialist Party
- Education: National University of Tucumán

María Florencia López (born 26 February 1979) is an Argentine politician of the Justicialist Party. She has been a National Senator for La Rioja Province since 2023. She previously served as Vice Governor of La Rioja from 2019 to 2023, under Governor Ricardo Quintela, as intendenta (mayor) of Arauco from 2015 to 2019, and as a member of the provincial legislature for Arauco from 2011 to 2015.

== Early life ==
López was born on 26 February 1980 in the city of La Rioja. Her family moved to Aimogasta when she was six years old, and she finished high school there. In 1997, she moved to San Miguel de Tucumán to study law at the National University of Tucumán; she graduated at age 22 with the best average score among women in the year 2001.

In 2003 she earned a notary's degree and began working in her own private practice. In 2005, she moved back to Aimogasta and began her political activism.

== Political career ==
In 2007, López was elected to the deliberative council of Arauco Department on the Justicialist Party list. Upon the end of her term in 2011, she was elected to the Legislature of La Rioja as one of Arauco's three representatives. In 2012, she was elected vice president of the women's wing of the La Rioja Justicialist Party.

In 2015, she was elected intendenta (mayor) of Arauco, becoming the first woman to ever hold the post. Two years later, she ran for one of La Rioja's three seats in the National Senate as the second candidate in the Frente Justicialista Riojano list, behind incumbent senator Carlos Menem. The FJR list came second with 45.50%, and so only Menem was elected for the minority seat as per the Senate's limited voting system.

Toward the end of her term as mayor, in 2019, López was selected to be the running mate of Ricardo Quintela in the Frente de Todos gubernatorial ticket. Quintela and López won with 44.89% of the vote, and, on 11 December 2019, she was sworn in as Vice Governor of La Rioja. López was succeeded in her post as mayor of Arauco by her sister, Virginia López.

Carlos Menem died on 14 February 2021, two years before the end of his fourth term as senator. As the second candidate in the 2017 FJR list, López was next in line to fill in Menem's vacancy in the Senate, but she declined to assume the position as she wished to remain in office as vice governor of La Rioja.

In November 2021, following the retirement of Supreme Court minister Elena Highton de Nolasco, a group of provincial parliamentarians from across the North-Western region of Argentina backed López to replace Highton's vacancy in the court.

Political offices
Preceded by Gustavo Minuzzi	Mayor of Arauco; 2015–2019	Succeeded by Virginia López
Preceded by Néstor Bosetti	Vice Governor of La Rioja; 2019–2023	Succeeded by Teresita Madera
