= Luis Herrera =

Luis Herrera may refer to:

- Luis Herrera (cyclist) (born 1961), Colombian cyclist
- Luis Herrera (tennis) (born 1971), Mexican tennis player
- Luis Herrera Campins (1925–2007), President of Venezuela
- Luis Bayón Herrera (1889–1956), Spanish film director
- Luis Beder Herrera (born 1951), Argentine politician
- Luis Herrera (footballer) (born 1962), Colombian footballer
