= San Antonio, Arauco =

Coordinates: 28°33′36″S 66°49′00″W

San Antonio
- Municipality and village
- Interactive map of San Antonio
- Country: Argentina
- Province: La Rioja Province
- Department: Arauco
- Time zone: UTC−3 (ART)
- Climate: BSh

San Antonio is a municipality and village in La Rioja Province in northwestern Argentina.
