= Villa Mazán =

Coordinates: 28°40′S 66°34′W

- Municipality and village
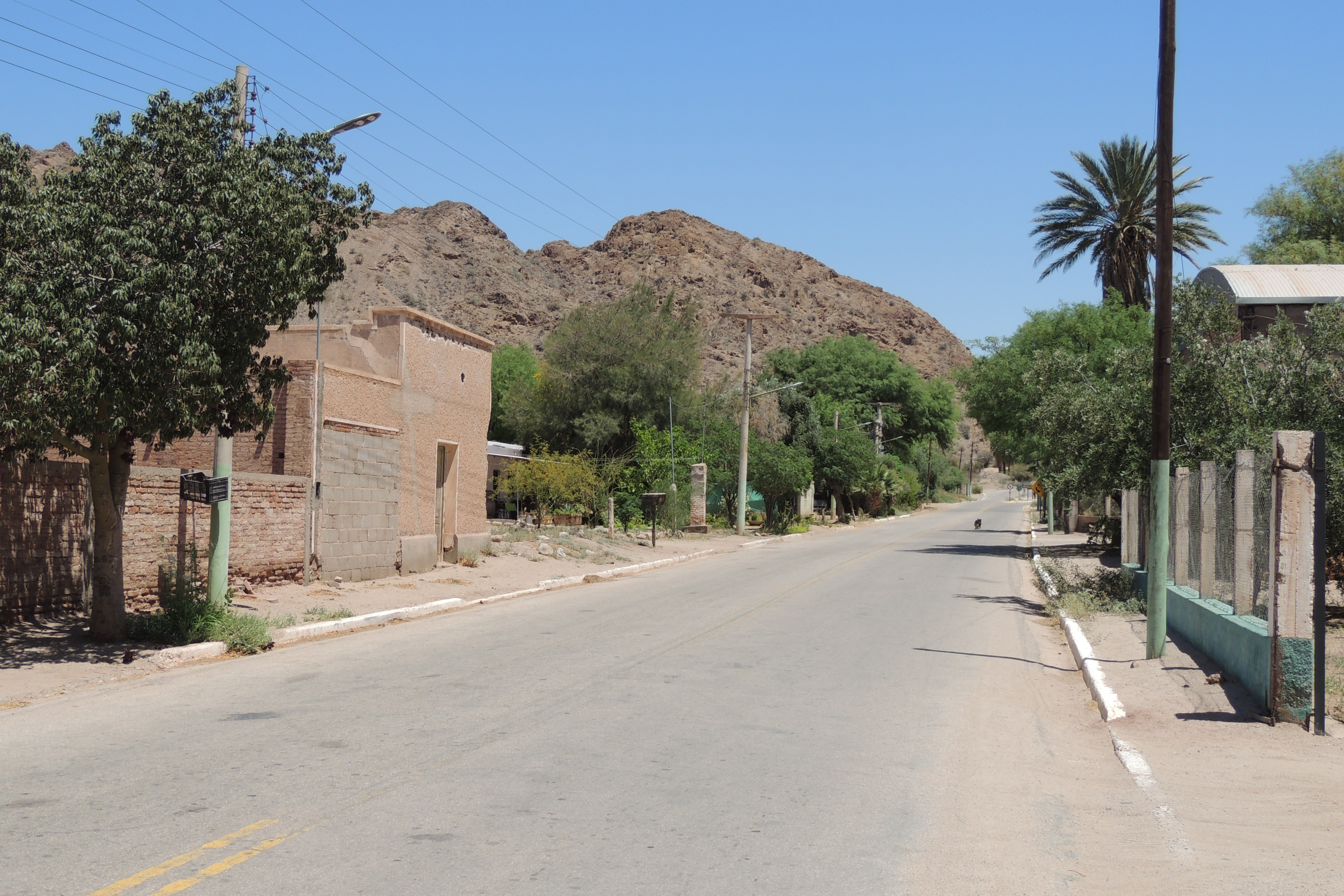
- Villa Mazán
- Interactive map of Villa Mazán
- Country: Argentina
- Province: La Rioja Province
- Department: Arauco
- Time zone: UTC−3 (ART)
- Climate: BWh

Villa Mazán is a municipality and village in La Rioja Province in northwestern Argentina.
