= Bañado de los Pantanos =

Coordinates: 28°15′S 66°50′W

- Municipality and village
- Interactive map of Bañado de los Pantanos
- Country: Argentina
- Province: La Rioja Province
- Department: Arauco
- Time zone: UTC−3 (ART)

Bañado de los Pantanos is a municipality and village in the Arauco Department of La Rioja Province in northwestern Argentina.
