= Capitán Vicente Almandos Almonacid Airport =

Airport in La Rioja Province, Argentina

Capitán Vicente Almandos Almonacid Airport Aeropuerto de La Rioja
- IATA: IRJ; ICAO: SANL

Summary
- Airport type: Public
- Operator: Aeropuertos Argentina 2000
- Serves: La Rioja, Argentina
- Elevation AMSL: 1,449 ft (442 m)
- Coordinates: 29°22′50″S 66°47′45″W

Map
- Location of airport in Argentina

Runways
Direction	Length		Surface
Direction	m	ft	Surface
03/21	2,860	9,383	Asphalt

Statistics (2016)
- Total passengers: 63.096
- Source: WAD, GCM, Google Maps, SkyVector

Capitán Vicente Almandos Almonacid Airport (Spanish: Aeropuerto de La Rioja - Capitán Vicente Almandos Almonacid) (IATA: IRJ, ICAO: SANL) is the main airport in La Rioja Province, Argentina serving the city of La Rioja. The airport is on the northeast side of the city.

The airport was named after the Argentine aviation pioneer Vicente Almandos Almonacid (es) (1882–1953).

== History ==
The airport was built in 1948, and was officially inaugurated with an LADE Vickers Viking flight on October 11, 1948 (linking La Rioja with Buenos Aires vía Río Cuarto, San Luis, Santa Rosa, and Córdoba). The first terminal was constructed in 1951. In 1952, Aerolíneas Argentinas started flying to La Rioja.

In 1969, the old north-south grass runway was replaced by the current asphalt Runway 03/21. In 1978, a new 940 m^{2} (10,100 sq ft) passenger terminal and 70 car parking lot were added. In 1990, the terminal was air conditioned.

The La Rioja VOR and non-directional beacon (idents: LAR) are located on the field.

Since March 16, 1999, it has been operated by Aeropuertos Argentina 2000.

A virtual airline named Alas La Rioja once operatedout of this airport, before cancelling flights in 2023.

== Airlines and destinations ==
Airlines	Destinations
Aerolíneas Argentinas	Buenos Aires–Aeroparque, Catamarca

== Statistics ==
Traffic by calendar year. Official ACI statistics.
	Passengers	Change from previous year	Aircraft operations	Change from previous year	Cargo (metric tons)	Change from previous year
2005	45,695	▼2.37%	1,916	▲8.19%	211	▼16.60%
2006	48,755	▲6.70%	1,791	▼6.52%	237	▲12.32%
2007	41,155	▼15.59%	1,416	▼20.94%	105	▼55.70%
2008	34,070	▼17.22%	1,448	▲2.26%	81	▼22.86%
2009	41,415	▲21.56%	1,945	▲34.32%	96	▲18.52%
2010	35,821	▼13.51%	2,029	▲4.32%	86	▼10.42%
Source: Airports Council International. World Airport Traffic Statistics (Years 2005-2010)

== See also ==
- Transport in Argentina
- List of airports in Argentina
