= Ángel Maza =

Argentine politician

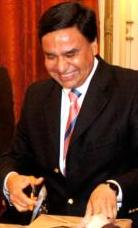

Governor of La Rioja
- In office 10 December 1995 – 12 April 2007
- Vice Governor: Luis Beder Herrera
- Preceded by: Bernabé Arnaudo
- Succeeded by: Luis Beder Herrera

Personal details
- Born: 18 December 1954 (age 71) La Rioja, La Rioja Province, Argentina
- Party: Justicialist Party
- Education: National University of Córdoba
- Profession: Geologist

Ángel Eduardo Maza (born 18 December 1954) is an Argentine Justicialist Party (PJ) politician. He was the governor of La Rioja Province during several terms, until he was ousted by impeachment in 2007. His sister, Ada Maza, is a national senator.

Maza was educated at the National University of Córdoba and graduated as a geologist, later earning a doctorate. He worked in the geological and mining services of the Government of Argentina and of La Rioja Province.

== Political career ==
From 1985, Maza served as a minister in the provincial government of La Rioja under then governor Carlos Menem, continuing until 1992, when Menem, by now President of Argentina, appointed Maza as minister for mining, a position which he held until 1995. That year he was elected governor of his province, taking office on 9 December. He was re-elected in 1999 and 2003.

Maza served as minister and collaborator of former president and La Rioja governor Carlos Menem, whose family dominated local politics. However Maza switched to support the Front for Victory faction of fellow Peronist President Néstor Kirchner. In 2006, Maza won the primary elections to head the Justicialist Party of La Rioja, defeating the Menemist candidate. This was seen as a final defeat against Carlos Menem by Kirchner.

== Impeachment ==
In mid-2006 a political conflict between Maza and his vice governor Luis Beder Herrera erupted, as the legislature, dominated by supporters of Herrera, heavily modified the budget, restricted certain powers of the governor, and admitted impeachment accusations against Maza. Later, as Maza contradicted a previous agreement with Herrera regarding his willingness to step aside and forfeit re-election, the legislature amended the provincial constitution to forbid re-election.

On 13 March 2007 the legislature suspended Maza while impeachment procedures were followed. The impeachment commission resolved to oust Maza on 12 April, charging him with not fulfilling his duties and illegally bypassing the legislative branch in the case of an expropriation operation in 2004. Beder Herrera assumed the governor's office pro tempore and announced upcoming elections.

Preceded by Bernabé Arnaudo	Governor of La Rioja; 1995–2007	Succeeded by Luis Beder Herrera
