= Arauco, La Rioja =

Coordinates: 28°35′S 66°47′W

Arauco (La Rioja)
- Municipality and village
- Interactive map of Arauco (La Rioja)
- Country: Argentina
- Province: La Rioja Province
- Department: Arauco
- Time zone: UTC−3 (ART)
- Climate: BWh

Arauco (La Rioja) is a municipality and village in La Rioja Province in northwestern Argentina.
