= Machigasta =

Coordinates: 28°33′S 66°48′W

- Municipality and village
- Interactive map of Machigasta
- Country: Argentina
- Province: La Rioja Province
- Department: Arauco
- Time zone: UTC−3 (ART)
- Climate: BWh

Machigasta is a municipality and village in La Rioja Province in northwestern Argentina.
