= Sergio Casas =

Argentine politician (born 1971)

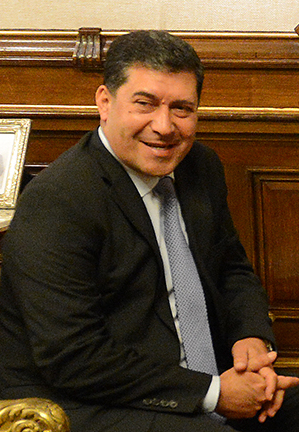

National Deputy
- Incumbent
- Assumed office 10 December 2019
- Constituency: La Rioja

Governor of La Rioja
- In office 10 December 2015 – 10 December 2019
- Vice Governor: Néstor Bosetti
- Preceded by: Luis Beder Herrera
- Succeeded by: Ricardo Quintela

Vice Governor of La Rioja
- In office 10 December 2011 – 10 December 2015
- Governor: Luis Beder Herrera
- Preceded by: Teresita Luna
- Succeeded by: Néstor Bosetti

Provincial Legislator of La Rioja
- In office 10 December 1995 – 10 December 2011
- Constituency: San Blas de los Sauces

Personal details
- Born: 13 January 1971 (age 55) San Blas de los Sauces, Argentina
- Party: Justicialist Party / Front for Victory

Sergio Casas (born 13 January 1971) is an Argentine politician who was Governor of La Rioja Province from 2015 to 2019. He previously served as Vice Governor and as a member of the La Rioja provincial legislature. Since 2019, he has been a National Deputy.

== Political career ==
Casas was a local deputy for the La Rioja Province from 1995 to 2011. He served as vice-governor from 2011 to 2015, under Luis Beder Herrera. He won the primary elections in the local Justicialist Party to run as governor, defeating the ministers Javier Tineo and Néstor Bosetti; Bosetti would run as his candidate for vicegovernor. He was elected governor in 2015 with the 53% of the vote. The candidate of the Radical Civic Union denounced electoral fraud, but eventually accepted Casas' victory. The province allows for a re-election, but as he served as vice-governor and governor in two consecutive terms, he may not run again in 2019. He acknowledges both the former governor Beder Herrera and the former president Cristina Fernández de Kirchner as political leaders.

Casas attended the presidential inauguration of Mauricio Macri on December 10, 2015, in spite of the instructions from the Front for Victory to avoid doing so. He then returned to La Rioja, to take office as governor. He had a personal meeting with Macri shortly after they took office, and they talked about the problems of the province. They agreed in the need to improve the infrastructure of the province. In contrast with Beder Herrera, Casas received the local mayors and legislators of other political parties, to arrange joint actions on behalf of the province. He announced that he would promote the production of tomatoes.

He made an amendment to the constitution of La Rioja, to be able to run for a new term in 2019. It was followed by a referendum: only 43.95% of the registered voters attended it, and of those 25.27% supported the amendment and 17.90% rejected it. However, the local parties did not agree on the interpretation of the results. Cambiemos, the main opposition alliance, considered that Casas should have obtained 35% of the vote to approve the amendment, and Casas considered that it was instead the explicit rejection the one that should have achieved such 35%. As a result, they did not agree if the amendment should be in force or not.

| Preceded by Luis Beder Herrera | Governor of La Rioja; 10 December 2015 – 10 December 2019 | Succeeded by Ricardo Quintela |
