= Coronel Felipe Varela International Airport =

Airport serving Catamarca, Argentina

Coronel Felipe Varela International Airport Aeropuerto Coronel Felipe Varela
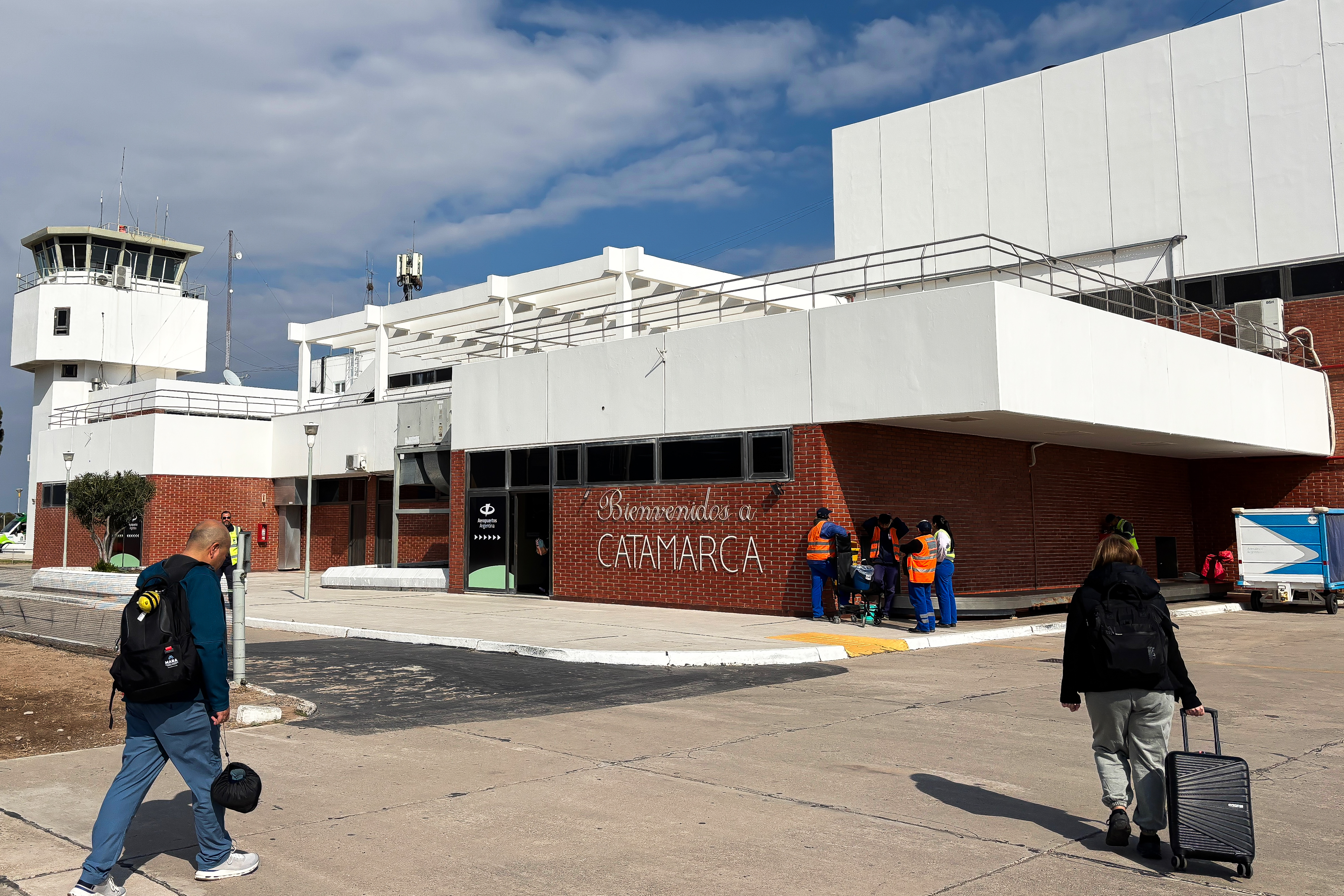
- IATA: CTC; ICAO: SANC

Summary
- Airport type: Public
- Operator: Government and Aeropuertos Argentina 2000
- Serves: Catamarca, Catamarca Province, Argentina
- Location: Ruta P33, Km 22, Los Puestos (K4712XAI)
- Elevation AMSL: 474.3 m (1,556 ft)
- Coordinates: 28°35′35″S 065°45′03″W

Map
- Airport in Argentina

Runways
Direction	Length		Surface
Direction	m	ft	Surface
02/20	2,800	9,186	Asphalt

Statistics (2016)
- Passengers: 90,192
- Passenger change 16–17: ▲43.95%
- Aircraft movements: 1,485
- Movements change 16–1: ▼6.06%
- Source: DAFIF, 2016 World Airport Traffic Report.

Coronel Felipe Varela International Airport (Spanish: Aeropuerto Coronel Felipe Varela) (IATA: CTC, ICAO: SANC) is an airport in Catamarca Province, Argentina, serving the provincial capital city of San Fernando del Valle de Catamarca. It was built in 1972, and was officially inaugurated with an Aerolíneas Argentinas Boeing 737 flight on 3 January 1973. Construction of the terminal started on 9 June 1981 and ended on 23 April 1987. Since 1999, the airport has been operated by Aeropuertos Argentina 2000. In 2007, it handled 44,477 passengers.

The airport is named after Felipe Varela, a soldier born in Catamarca in 1821 who fought in the Paraguayan War and died in Ñantoco, Chile, in 1870.

== Airlines and destinations ==
Airlines	Destinations
Aerolíneas Argentinas	Buenos Aires–Aeroparque, La Rioja

== Statistics ==
Traffic by calendar year. Official ACI Statistics
	Passengers	Change from previous year	Aircraft operations	Change from previous year	Cargo (metric tons)	Change from previous year
2005	48,629	N.A.	2,821	N.A.	244	N.A.
2006	43,897	▼9.73%	2,057	▼27.08%	130	▼46.72%
2007	44,477	▲1.32%	2,191	▲6.51%	65	▼50.00%
2008	36,469	▼18.00%	1,959	▼10.59%	76	▲16.92%
2009	41,212	▲13.01%	2,329	▲18.89%	61	▼19.74%
2010	31,428	▼23.74%	1,039	▼55.39%	51	▼16.39%
Source: Airports Council International. World Airport Traffic Statistics (Years 2006-2010)
