= Sierra de Velasco =

Mountain range in Argentina

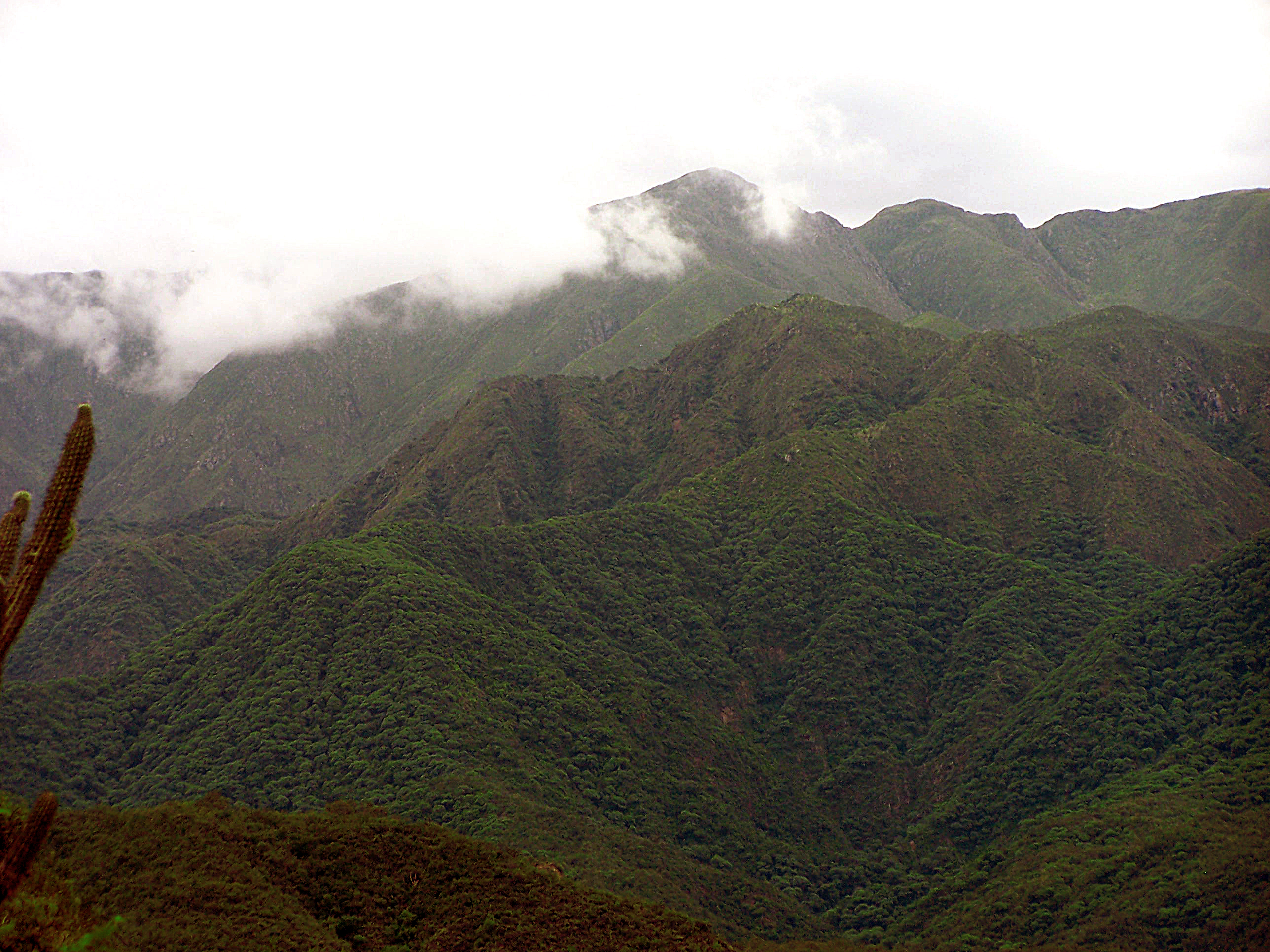
The western part of Sierra de Velasco captures during summer moist air from the Atlantic allowing some sub-tropical forests to grow on it.

Sierra de Velasco is a mountain range in the Argentine province of La Rioja. Sierra de Velasco runs from north to south just west of the city of La Rioja and east of Chilecito.
