= Juan Ramírez de Velasco =

Spanish conquistador

Juan Ramírez de la Piscina de Velasco y Ábalos
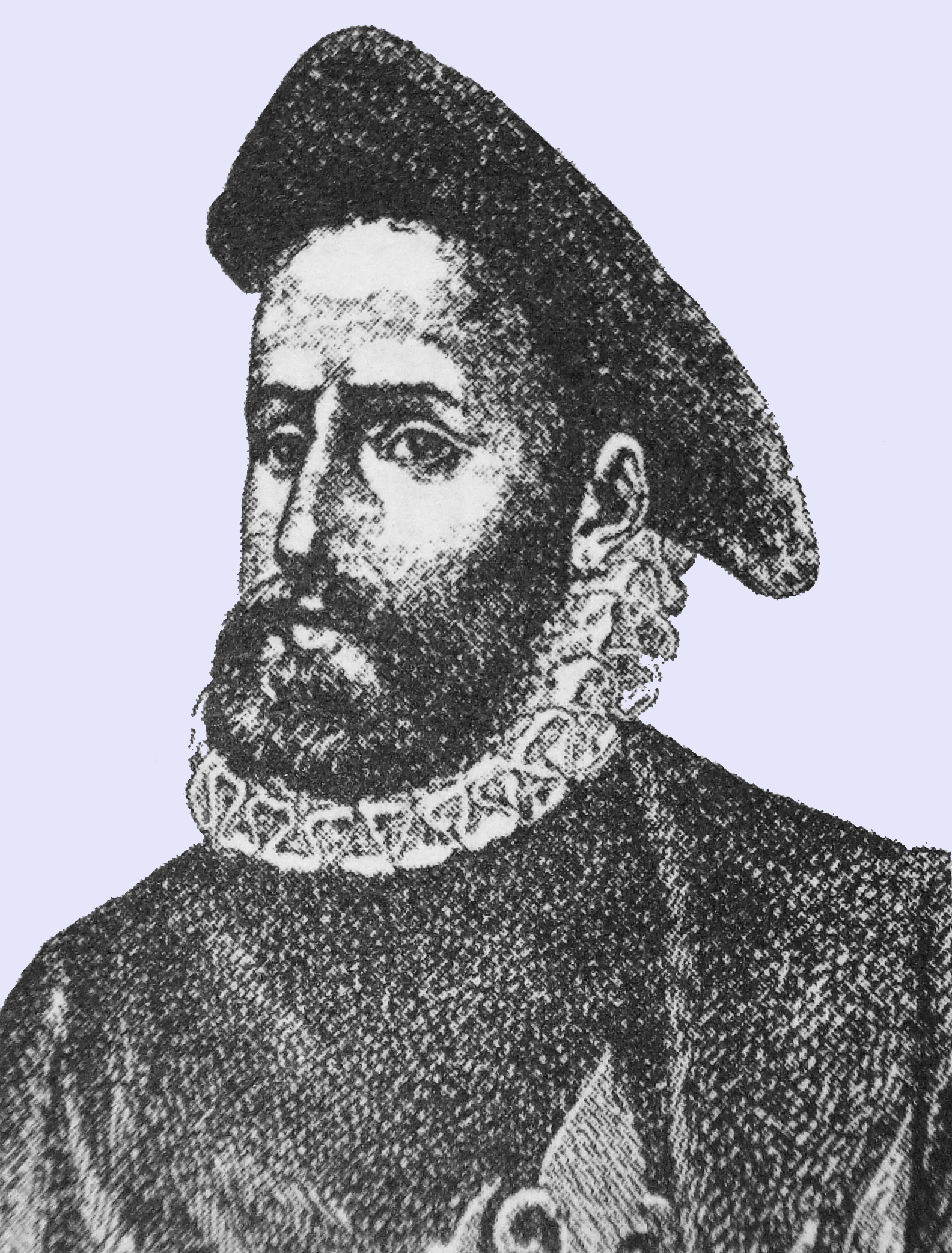
- portrait of Juan Ramírez de Velasco

Governor of the Tucumán (1586-1593) Governor of the Río de la Plata and Paraguay (1595-1596)
- Monarch: Philip II

Personal details
- Born: 1539 La Rioja, Spain
- Died: 1597 (aged 57–58) Santa Fe, Viceroyalty of Peru
- Occupation: Conquistador
- Profession: Military man
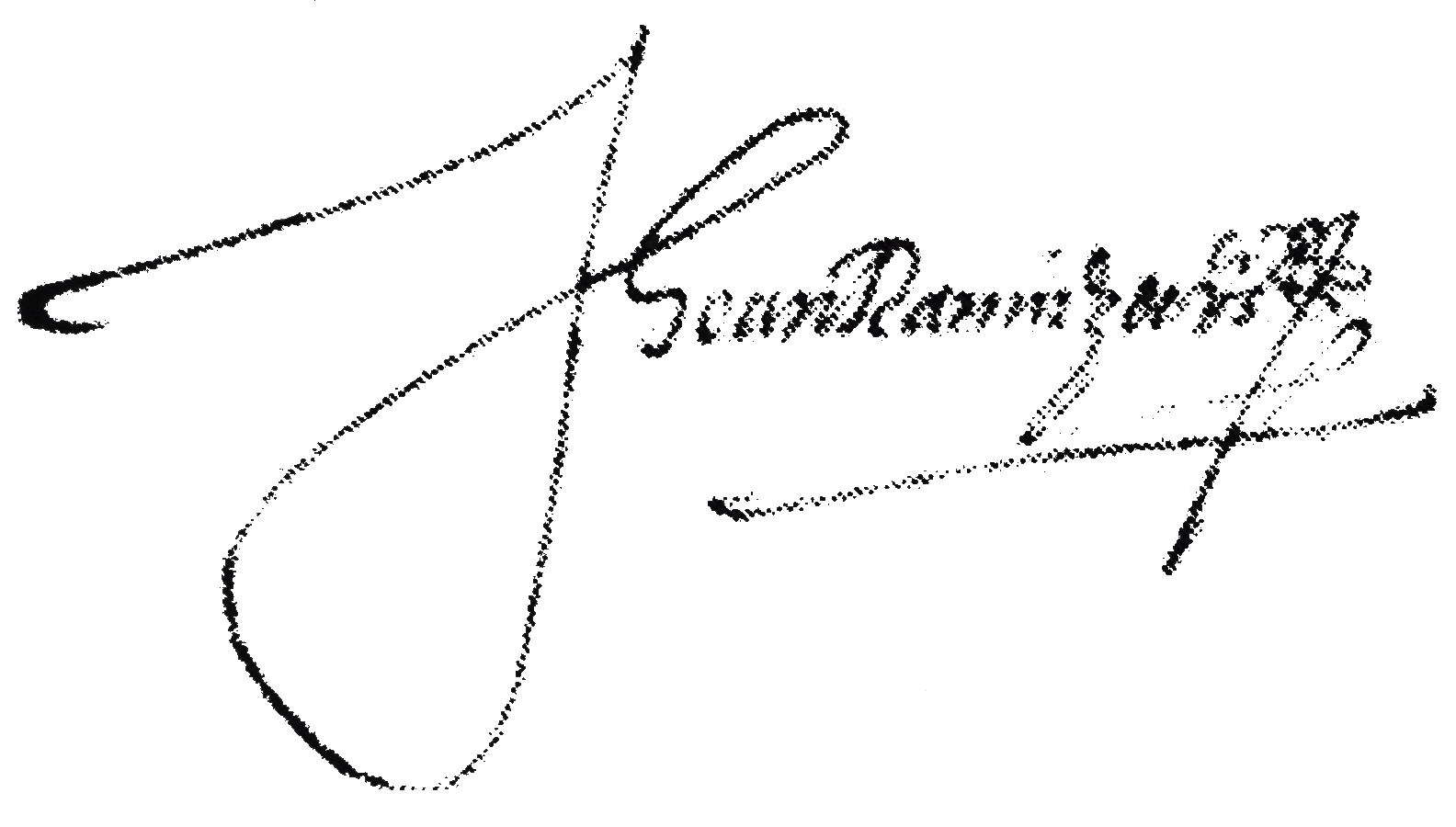
- Signature

Military service
- Allegiance: Spain
- Branch/service: Spanish Army
- Rank: General

Juan Ramírez de Velasco (c.1539 – 1597) was a Spanish conquistador of Chile and Argentina. Founder of the province of La Rioja.

== Biography ==
Juan Ramírez de Velasco was born in the village of Estollo, son of a noble family of Castile, and descendant of the King of Navarre Ramiro Sánchez. In 1570 Ramirez was married in Seville with Catherine de Ugarte, a Spanish noblewoman, daughter of Pedro Santiago de Ugarte and Ana de Velasco.

== Career ==
In his youth Ramírez fought in Flanders and Italy during the Italian War of 1551–59. Arrived in America Ramirez was appointed governor of Tucumán by Philip II of Spain to replace Hernando de Lerma. Ramírez served in the government of Tucuman between 1586 and 1593.

In 1588 being the governor of Tucumán Juan Ramirez de Velasco made expeditions against the Indians in calchaquí valley and won the allegiance of a son of Juan Calchaquí. Shortly after he founded the city of Todos los Santos de la Nueva Rioja. In 1592 he founded the city of Madrid de las Juntas in the present department Metán.

In 1594 Juan Ramírez Velasco was appointed commander of the Governorate of the Rio de la Plata a position he held between 1595 and 1597. He was replaced by Hernando Arias de Saavedra.

Juan Ramirez de Velasco died in February 1597 in the City of Santa Fe, Argentina.
