= Arauco Department =

Coordinates: 28°34′10″S 66°47′56″W

Arauco Departamento Arauco
- Department
- Interactive map of Arauco
- Country: Argentina
- Seat: La Rioja

Area
  - Total: 1,992 km^{2} (769 sq mi)

Population (2022)
  - Total: 16,257
  - Density: 8.161/km^{2} (21.14/sq mi)

Arauco is a department of La Rioja Province, Argentina.

== Population ==
It had 723 inhabitants at the 2001 census, an increase of 16% since the last census in 1991, when it had 623 inhabitants.

== Settlements ==
- Aimogasta
- Arauco
- Bañado de los Pantanos
- Estación Mazán
- Machigasta
- Termas de Santa Teresita
- Udpinango
- Villa Mazán
- San Antonio
