= Anguinán =

Coordinates: 29°12′S 67°28′W

- Municipality and village
- Interactive map of Anguinán
- Country: Argentina
- Province: La Rioja Province
- Time zone: UTC−3 (ART)
- Climate: BWh

Anguinán is a municipality and village in La Rioja Province in northwestern Argentina.
