= Estación Mazán =

Coordinates: 28°40′S 66°29′W

- Village
- Interactive map of Estación Mazán
- Country: Argentina
- Province: La Rioja Province
- Department: Arauco
- Time zone: UTC−3 (ART)

Estación Mazán is a village in Mazán District, Arauco Department, La Rioja Province in northwestern Argentina.
