= Governor of La Rioja Province =

- Provincial coat of Arms

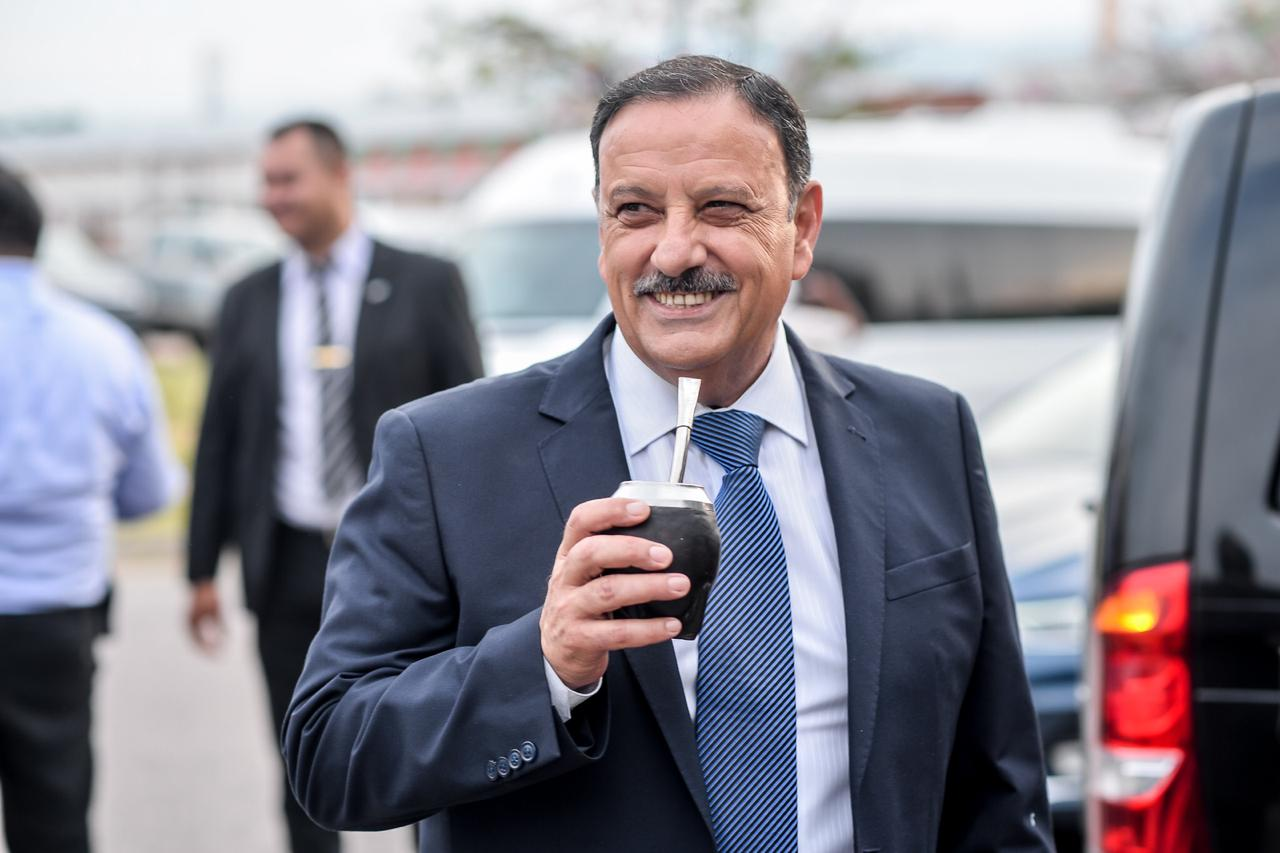
- Incumbent; Ricardo Quintela since 11 December 2019
- Appointer: Direct popular vote
- Term length: 4 years
- Inaugural holder: Diego de Barrenechea

The Governor of La Rioja (Spanish: Gobernador de la Provincia de La Rioja) is a citizen of La Rioja Province in Argentina holding the office of governor for the corresponding period. The governor is elected alongside a vice-governor. Currently the governor of La Rioja is Ricardo Quintela, since 11 December 2019.

== Governors since 1983 ==
Image	Governor	Term in office	Party	Election	Vice Governor
	Carlos Saúl Menem	10 December 1983 – 8 July 1989	PJ	1983	Alberto Cavero
	Carlos Saúl Menem	10 December 1983 – 8 July 1989	PJ	1987	Alberto Cavero
	Alberto Cavero	8 July 1989 – 15 November 1989	PJ	1987	Vacant
	Agustín de la Vega	15 November 1989 – 4 July 1991	PJ	—N/a	Vacant
	Luis Beder Herrera	4 July 1991 – 10 December 1991	PJ	—N/a	Vacant
	Bernabé Arnaudo	10 December 1991 – 10 December 1995	PJ	1991	Luis Beder Herrera
	Ángel Maza	10 December 1995 – 12 April 2007	PJ	1995	Miguel Ángel Asís
	Ángel Maza	10 December 1995 – 12 April 2007	PJ	1999	Luis Beder Herrera
	Ángel Maza	10 December 1995 – 12 April 2007	PJ	2003	Luis Beder Herrera
	Luis Beder Herrera	12 April 2007 – 10 December 2015	PJ	2003	Vacant
	Luis Beder Herrera	12 April 2007 – 10 December 2015	PJ	2007	Teresita Luna
	Luis Beder Herrera	12 April 2007 – 10 December 2015	PJ	2011	Sergio Casas
	Sergio Casas	10 December 2015 – 10 December 2019	PJ	2015	Néstor Bosetti
	Ricardo Quintela	10 December 2019 – Incumbent	PJ	2019	Florencia López

== See also ==
- Legislature of La Rioja
