= Legislature of La Rioja =

Legislative body of La Rioja Province, Argentina

Legislature of La Rioja Province

Type
- Type: Unicameral

Leadership
- President (Vice Governor): Florencia López (PJ/FDT) since 10 December 2019
- First Vice President: Teresita Leonor Madera (PJ/FDT) since 10 December 2019
- Second Vice President: Ismael Aníbal Bordagaray, JXC since 10 December 2019

Structure
- Seats: 36 legislators
- Legislature political groups: Government (29): Frente de Todos; Opposition (7): JXC (4); Libertad Avanza (1); Hay Futuro (1); Nuestra Rioja (1)
- Length of term: 4 years
- Authority: Constitution of La Rioja

Elections
- Legislature voting system: Proportional representation / First-past-the-post
- Last Legislature election: 14 November 2021
- Next Legislature election: May 7 2023

Website
- legislaturalarioja.gob.ar

The Legislature of La Rioja (Spanish: Legislatura de la provincia de La Rioja), also sometimes referred to as the Legislative Function (Función Legislativa), is the unicameral legislative body of La Rioja Province, in Argentina. It comprises 36 legislators, elected in each of the 18 departments of La Rioja. Half of the legislature is renewed every two years.

The legislature was established by the first provincial constitution, adopted in 1855, and convened for the first time on 18 March 1856. According to the provincial constitution, the legislature must count with one member per 4,000 inhabitants. Out of the 18 departments, 12 elect a single legislator, and thus employ the first-past-the-post system. The remaining six departments employ proportional representation to elect its multiple legislators. The Capital Department has the largest number of representatives in the legislature, with 8.

The legislature is presided by the vice governor, who is elected every four years alongside the governor. The current vice governor, elected in 2019, is Florencia López, of the Justicialist Party.

== Seats per department ==
Department	Seats
Ángel V. Peñaloza	1
Arauco	3
Belgrano	1
Capital	8
Castro Barros	1
Chamical	3
Chilecito	4
Facundo Quiroga	1
Famatina	1
Felipe Varela	3
Independencia	1
Lamadrid	1
Ocampo	1
Rosario Vera Peñaloza	3
San Blas de los Sauces	1
San Martín	1
Sanagasta	1
Vinchina	1
Total	36
