= Capital Department, La Rioja =

Capital Departamento Capital
- Department
- Interactive map of Capital
- Country: Argentina
- Seat: La Rioja

Area
  - Total: 13,638 km^{2} (5,266 sq mi)

Population (2022)
  - Total: 211,651
  - Density: 15.519/km^{2} (40.195/sq mi)

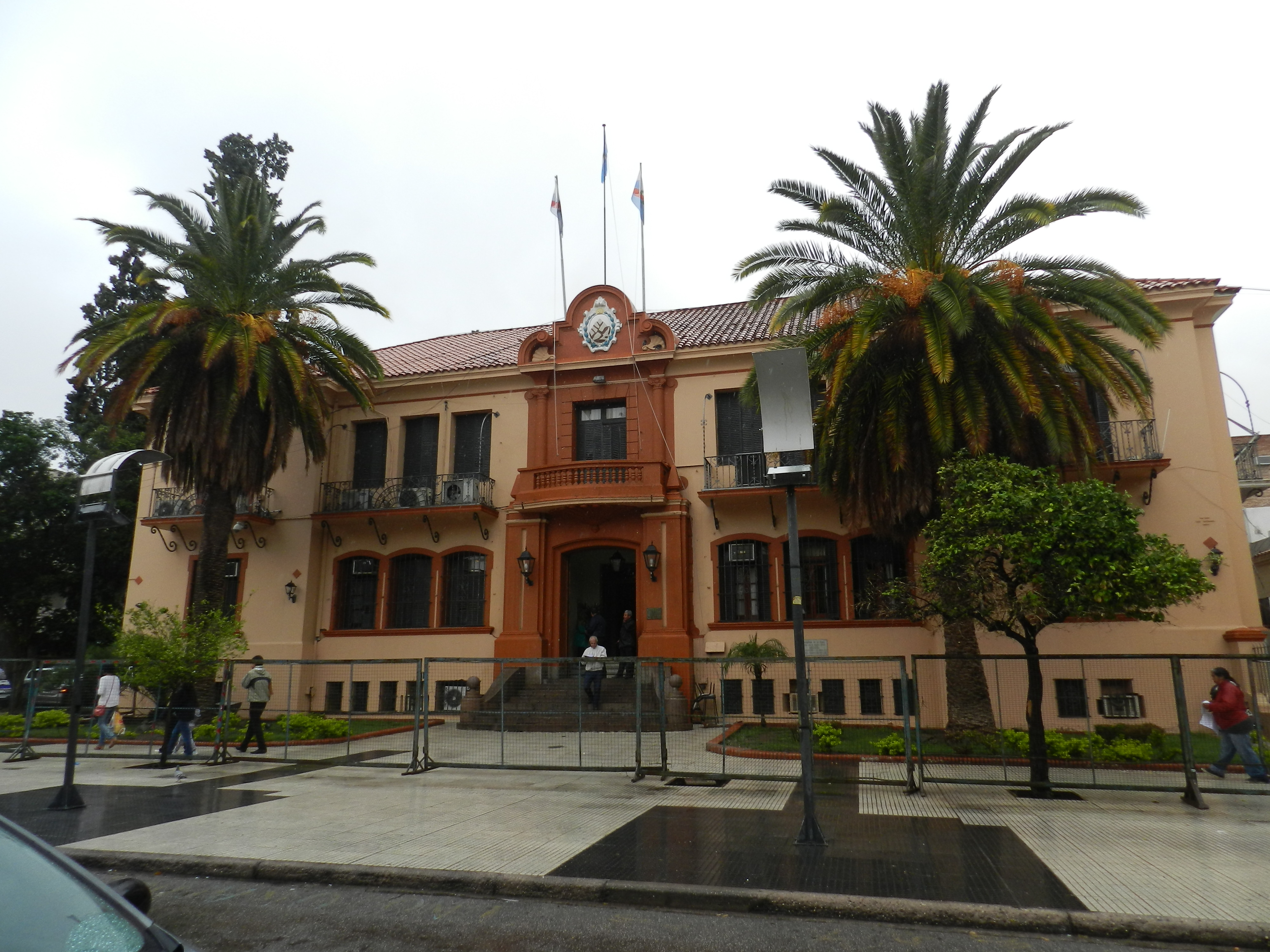
Capital Department

Capital is a department of the province of La Rioja (Argentina).
