= Luis Beder Herrera =

Argentine Justicialist Party politician

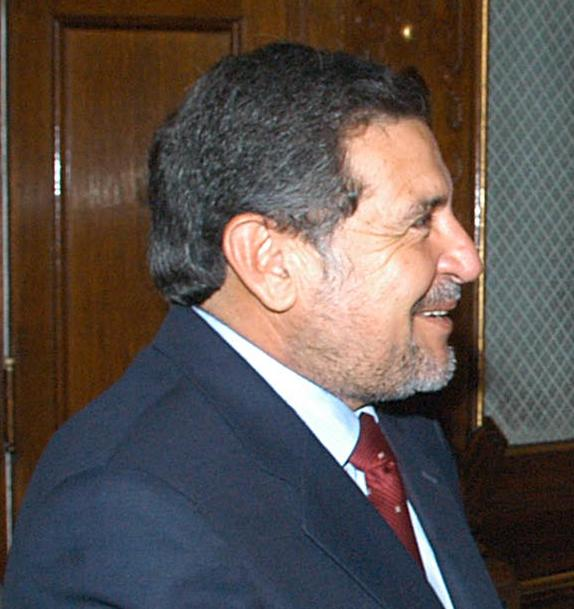
- Luis Beder Herrera

Governor of La Rioja
- In office 8 March 2007 – 10 December 2015
- Lieutenant: None (2007); Teresa Luna (2007–)
- Preceded by: Ángel Maza
- Succeeded by: Sergio Casas

Vice Governor of La Rioja
- In office 10 December 1995 – 8 March 2007
- Governor: Ángel Maza

Personal details
- Born: May 26, 1951 (age 74) Campanas, La Rioja, Argentina
- Party: Justicialist Party
- Profession: Lawyer

Luis Beder Herrera (born 26 May 1951) is an Argentine Justicialist Party (PJ) politician. He was the governor of La Rioja Province from 2007 to 2015.

Born in Campanas, La Rioja, Herrera graduated as a lawyer in 1976 from the National University of the Littoral. In 1983 he was re-elected as a provincial deputy for Famatina Department, serving until 1989 with a period as 1st Vice President of the Chamber of Deputies. In 1991 he became coordinating minister of government for the province and in 1995 he was elected vice governor as running mate to Ángel Maza.

Preceded by Ángel Maza	Governor of La Rioja; 8 March 2007 – 2015	Succeeded by Sergio Casas
