= La Rioja, Argentina =

La Rioja City of All Saints of New Rioja
- City
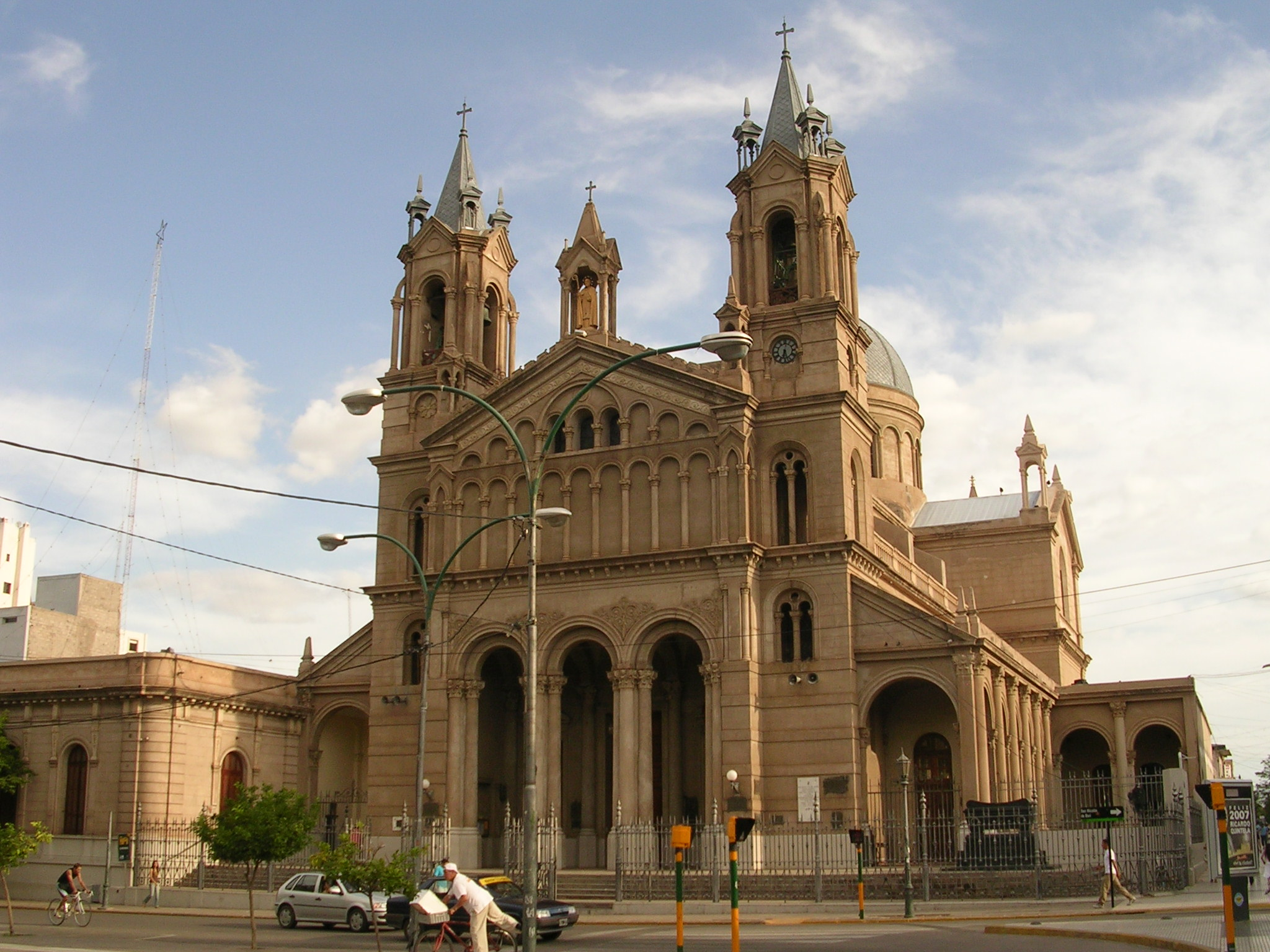
- Cathedral and Basilica of San Nicolás de La Rioja

- Location of La Rioja in Argentina
- Coordinates: 29°24′45″S 66°51′15″W
- Country: Argentina
- Province: La Rioja
- Department: Capital
- Founded: 1591
- Founder: Juan Ramírez de Velasco

Government
  - Intendant: Armando Molina (PJ)
- Elevation: 515 m (1,690 ft)

Population (2022 census [INDEC])
  - Total: 383,865
- Demonym: riojano/a
- Time zone: UTC−3 (ART)
- CPA base: F5300
- Dialing code: +54 3804
- Website: Official website

La Rioja ( Spanish pronunciation: [la ˈrjoxa], locally [la ˈʂjoxa]), founded as the City of All Saints of New Rioja (Spanish: Ciudad de Todos los Santos de Nueva Rioja), is the capital city of the eponymous La Rioja Province, located in the Argentine Northwest at the foot of the Sierra de Velasco. Founded in 1591 by Spanish conquistador Juan Ramírez de Velasco under the original name Todos los Santos de Nueva Rioja, the settlement was named after his home region in Spain. Situated 600 meters above sea level, the city had a population of 178,872 inhabitants as of the 2010 census.

The city experiences a semi-arid climate characterized by hot summers, where temperatures frequently exceed 45 °C (113 °F), and mild winters, with rainfall occurring almost exclusively during the summer months. As the provincial cultural and economic hub, La Rioja features notable historical sights such as the 17th-century Museo Folklórico, which showcases local traditions like chaya music and the Tinkunaco festival, and the 23,000-capacity Estadio Carlos Augusto Mercado Luna. The city's regional transportation network is anchored by the Capitán Vicente Almandos Almonacid Airport, which provides commercial airline connectivity to the rest of Argentina.

== History ==
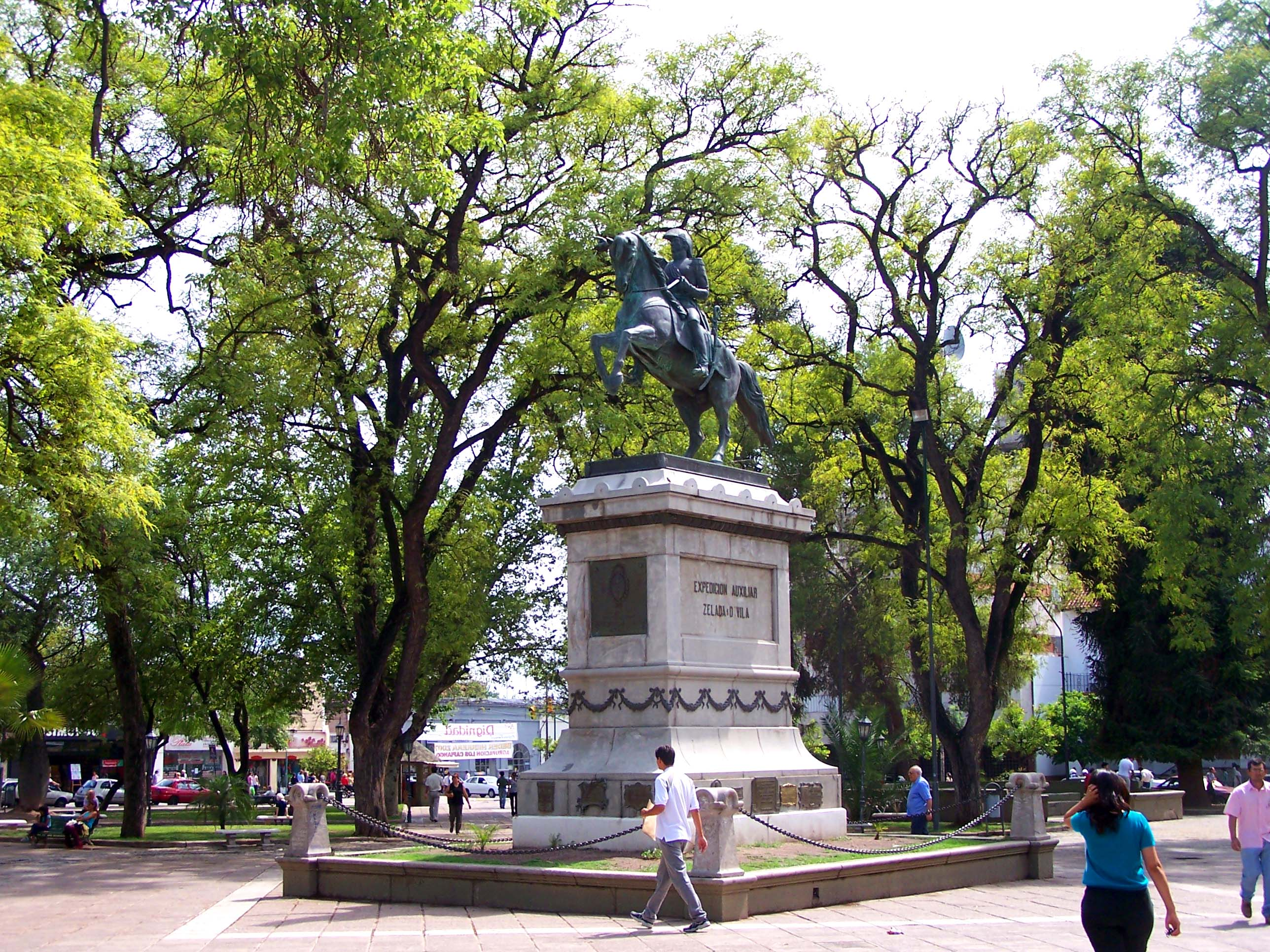
Monument to José de San Martín, in the Plaza 25 de Mayo.

It was founded in 1591 by Spanish conquistador, Juan Ramírez de Velasco.The city and its eponymous province are named after La Rioja, a region in Spain after Velasco came to named the city after his home town and called it Todos los Santos de Nueva Rioja and was shortened to be only La Rioja.

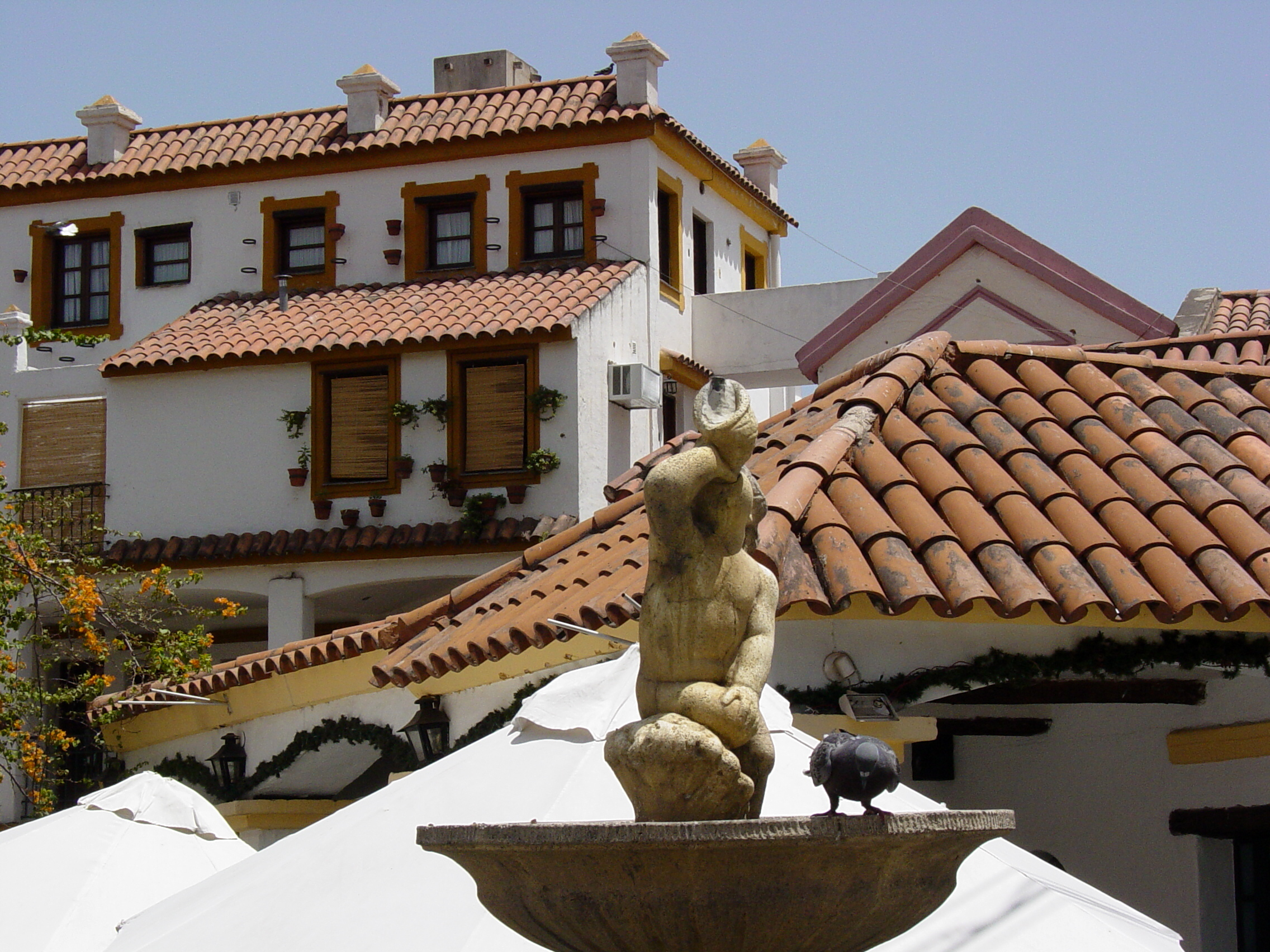
Colonial architecture

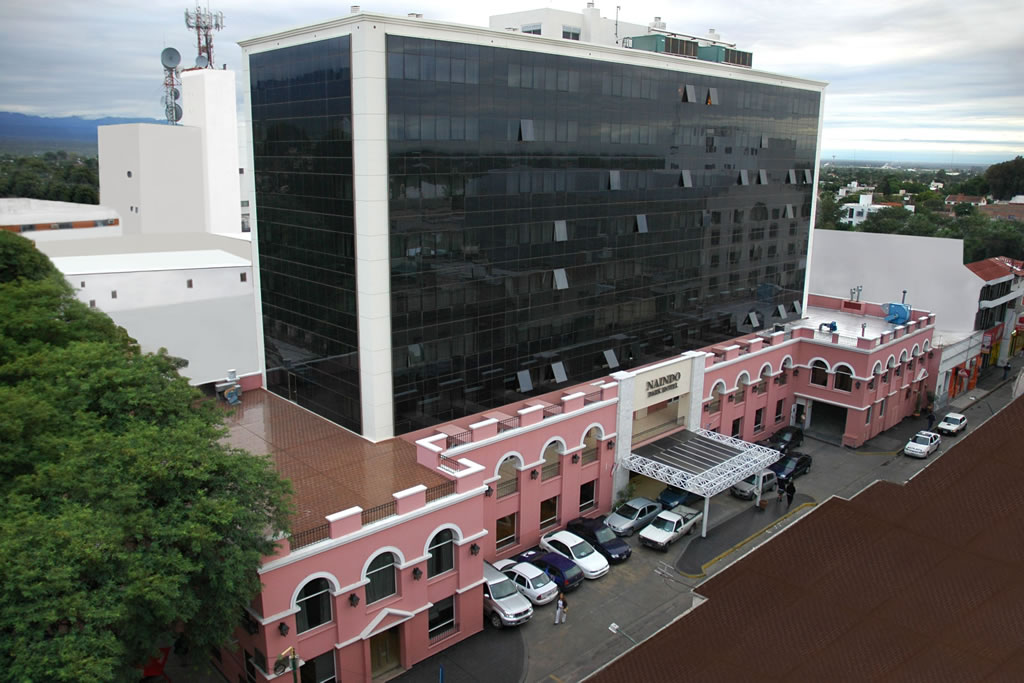
Naindo Park Hotel

== Geography ==
=== Location ===
It was located in the northeast of Argentina, specifically 600 meters above sea level, at the foot of the Sierra de Velasco. It was also the capital city of La Rioja Province, Argentina with 178,872 inhabitants in 2010.

=== Climate ===
La Rioja has a semi-arid climate (BSh, according to the Köppen climate classification), with average temperatures of 5 °C (41 °F) to 19 °C (66 °F) in winter and 21 °C (70 °F) to 35 °C (95 °F) in summer, but with maximum temperatures of more than 45 °C (113 °F). The average annual rainfall is 411.4 mm (16 in), falling almost exclusively during the summer when moist tropical air from the northeast enters the region. The highest recorded temperature was 46.4 °C (115.5 °F) on 28 December 1971 while the lowest recorded temperature was −7.2 °C (19.0 °F) on 5 August 1966.

Climate data for La Rioja, Argentina (Capitán Vicente Almandos Almonacid Airport) 1991–2020, extremes 1931–present
Month	Jan	Feb	Mar	Apr	May	Jun	Jul	Aug	Sep	Oct	Nov	Dec	Year
Record high °C (°F)	45.5 (113.9)	45.0 (113.0)	42.0 (107.6)	40.0 (104.0)	37.3 (99.1)	30.5 (86.9)	37.3 (99.1)	41.4 (106.5)	42.6 (108.7)	45.2 (113.4)	44.7 (112.5)	46.4 (115.5)	46.4 (115.5)
Mean daily maximum °C (°F)	35.2 (95.4)	33.2 (91.8)	30.8 (87.4)	26.8 (80.2)	22.6 (72.7)	19.7 (67.5)	19.5 (67.1)	23.3 (73.9)	26.9 (80.4)	30.8 (87.4)	33.6 (92.5)	35.4 (95.7)	28.2 (82.8)
Daily mean °C (°F)	27.6 (81.7)	26.0 (78.8)	23.9 (75.0)	19.8 (67.6)	15.3 (59.5)	11.4 (52.5)	10.6 (51.1)	14.2 (57.6)	18.4 (65.1)	22.8 (73.0)	25.6 (78.1)	27.6 (81.7)	20.3 (68.5)
Mean daily minimum °C (°F)	21.5 (70.7)	20.1 (68.2)	18.6 (65.5)	14.6 (58.3)	9.9 (49.8)	5.6 (42.1)	4.2 (39.6)	6.9 (44.4)	11.3 (52.3)	15.9 (60.6)	18.9 (66.0)	20.8 (69.4)	14.0 (57.2)
Record low °C (°F)	8.4 (47.1)	9.5 (49.1)	5.2 (41.4)	1.0 (33.8)	−3.0 (26.6)	−5.6 (21.9)	−6.9 (19.6)	−7.2 (19.0)	−2.5 (27.5)	3.5 (38.3)	3.3 (37.9)	7.7 (45.9)	−7.2 (19.0)
Average precipitation mm (inches)	90.3 (3.56)	78.8 (3.10)	63.4 (2.50)	30.8 (1.21)	8.2 (0.32)	4.0 (0.16)	4.2 (0.17)	3.3 (0.13)	5.5 (0.22)	19.5 (0.77)	32.0 (1.26)	66.9 (2.63)	406.9 (16.02)
Average precipitation days (≥ 0.1 mm)	8.3	7.6	6.2	4.1	2.5	1.0	0.8	0.6	1.7	2.6	4.3	6.4	46.1
Average snowy days	0.0	0.0	0.0	0.0	0.0	0.1	0.1	0.1	0.0	0.0	0.0	0.0	0.2
Average relative humidity (%)	59.9	63.9	67.9	70.0	71.1	70.3	63.2	52.2	47.6	49.3	51.5	54.4	60.1
Mean monthly sunshine hours	232.5	206.2	204.6	189.0	179.8	174.0	213.9	235.6	219.0	244.9	237.0	235.6	2,572.1
Mean daily sunshine hours	7.5	7.3	6.6	6.3	5.8	5.8	6.9	7.6	7.3	7.9	7.9	7.6	7.0
Percentage possible sunshine	62	64	57	60	62	60	65	73	64	65	66	62	63
Source 1: Servicio Meteorológico Nacional
Source 2: Meteo Climat (record highs and lows), UNLP (percent sun only 1971–1980)

== Sights ==
The Museo Folklórico is set in a 17th-century building, and its displays include local chaya music and the Tinkunaco festival. The 23,000-capacity Estadio Carlos Augusto Mercado Luna is located in La Rioja.

== Transportation ==
The city is served by Capitán Vicente Almandos Almonacid Airport, with the only airline operating is Aerolíneas Argentinas.
