= Silvia Sapag =

Argentine politician (born 1949)

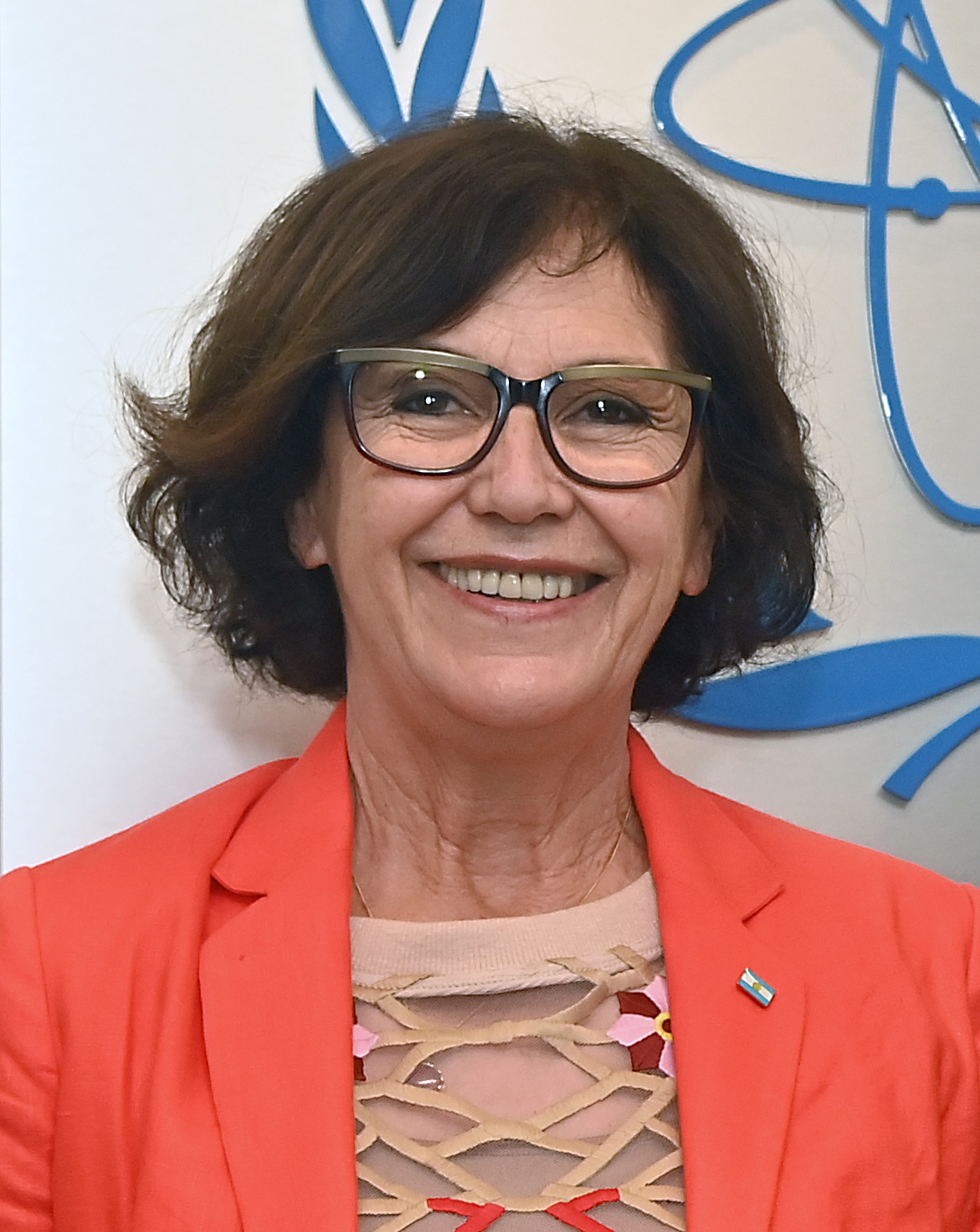

National Senator
- In office 10 December 2019 – 10 December 2025
- Constituency: Neuquén
- In office 10 December 1998 – 10 December 2001
- Constituency: Neuquén

National Deputy
- In office 17 December 2008 – 10 December 2009
- Constituency: Neuquén

Personal details
- Born: 22 February 1949 (age 77) Cutral Có, Argentina
- Party: Neuquén People's Movement
- Other political affiliations: Front for Victory (2015–2017); Frente de Todos (2019–2023)
- Education: National University of Comahue

Silvia Estela Sapag (born 22 February 1949) is an Argentine politician. A scion of the Sapag political family and a member of the Neuquén People's Movement, Sapag served as National Senator for Neuquén Province from 1998 to 2001 and later from 2019 to 2025, and as a National Deputy from 2008 to 2009.

== Early life and education ==
Silvia Sapag was born on 22 February 1949 in Cutral Có, Neuquén Province. She is the second child and only daughter of Estela Romero and Felipe Sapag, co-founder of the Neuquén People's Movement and four-time governor of Neuquén. Other prominent members of her direct family include her brother Luis Felipe Sapag, who was a provincial legislator.

Sapag studied to be a teacher in Neuquén, and later earned a geography professor degree from the National University of Comahue in 1970. She taught both in elementary and secondary schools. She also worked as a typewriting editor in Sur Argentino, a local newspaper in Neuquén, from 1976 to 1977.

== Political career ==
Sapag's political career began in the Neuquén People's Movement (MPN). As daughter of one of its founders, Sapag participated in numerous campaigns and organized the female branch of the MPN. She was a member of the party's convention in 1990, 1991, and 1992, and served as president of the electoral commission in the party's primaries in 1993. She was vice-president of the MPN from 1992 to 1995. In 1997, she ran against Jorge Sobisch for the chairmanship of the party.

She also held numerous posts during the successive governorships of her father. She was his private secretary during his two terms from 1970 to 1972 and from 1973 to 1976. During his fourth governorship (1983–1987), she was director of social emergency of Neuquén and co-ordinator of the Provincial Institute of Housing and Urban Planning. She was an elector in the 1989 presidential election.

=== Congresswoman ===
In 1998, she was appointed as National Senator by the provincial legislature of Neuquén, with mandate until 2001. She replaced Jorge Solana. She formed part of the parliamentary commission on energy and fuels. In 2000, Sapag accused the senator from Salta, Emilio Cantarero, of offering bribes to fellow senators in exchange for voting in favour of a pro-oil industry bill.

Following the end of her father's last term as governor, she stopped participating in MPN activities (while keeping her membership), and later joined the Front for Victory (FPV). In the 2005 legislative election, she was a candidate for National Deputy in the FPV list, as the second candidate, behind Oscar Massei. The FPV list came second in the election, with 35.46% of the vote, and Sapag was not elected. She would, however, take office in replacement of Massei upon his resignation in 2008. Her term expired on 10 December 2009.

In the 2019 general election, Sapag ran for one of Neuquén's three seats in the Senate as the second candidate in the Frente de Todos (FDT) list, behind Oscar Parrilli. The FDT list was the most voted in the province, with 47.68% of the vote, granting both candidates the seats for the majority as per the Senate's limited voting system.

Sapag forms part of the parliamentary commissions on Women's Affairs, Constitutional Affairs, National Economy and Investment, Foreign Affairs and Worship, and Labour and Social Prevision. She was a supporter of the legalisation of abortion in Argentina, voting in favour of the 2020 Voluntary Interruption of Pregnancy bill debated by the Argentine Congress.

During her 2019–2025 term, Silvia Sapag was one of three members of the Sapag family serving in the National Congress of Argentina, alongside Carmen Lucila Crexell and Alma Sapag.
