= Sapag =

Sapag may refer to:

- Alma Sapag (born 1952), Argentine politician
- Elías Sapag (1911–1993), Lebanese-born Argentine politician
- Felipe Sapag (1917–2010), Argentine politician
- Jorge Sapag (born 1951), Argentine politician
- Luz Sapag (1944–2010), Argentine mayor
