= Alma Sapag =

Argentine journalist and politician

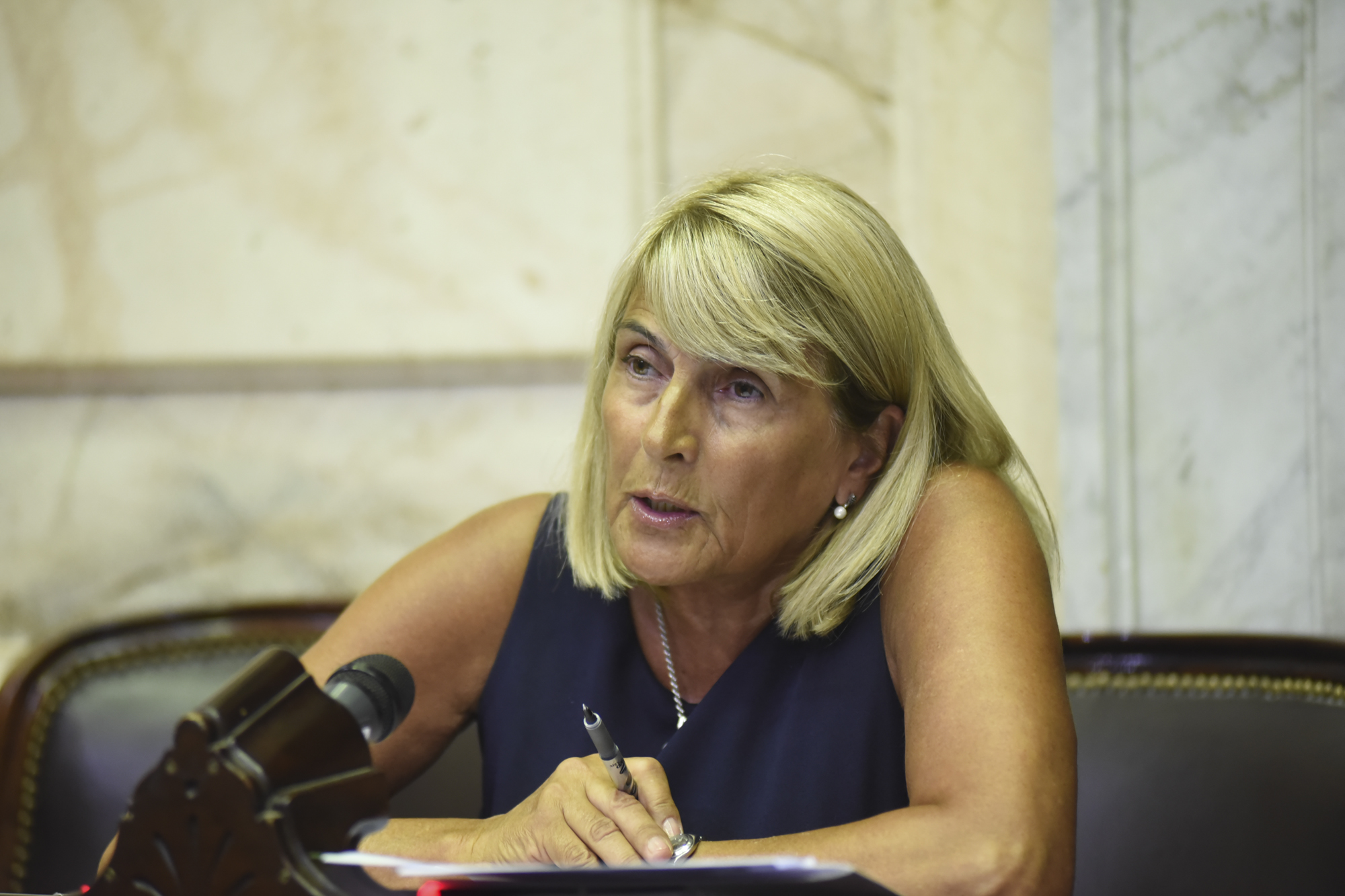

National Deputy
- In office 10 December 2017 – 10 December 2021
- Constituency: Neuquén

Personal details
- Born: 2 October 1952 (age 73) Zapala, Argentina
- Party: Neuquén People's Movement

Alma Liniana "Chani" Sapag (born 2 October 1952) is an Argentine politician who served as a member of the Argentine Chamber of Deputies elected in Neuquén Province from 2017 to 2021. A member of the Neuquén People's Movement (MPN), Sapag has previously served as a councilwoman in Caviahue (Ñorquín Department) and as a member of the Neuquén provincial legislature.

Alma Sapag is a member of the Sapag family, a renowned and powerful political family in Neuquén Province. Her father, Elías Sapag, was co-founder of the MPN and served as a National Senator. Her uncle, Felipe Sapag, was five times governor of Neuquén. She is also the aunt of Lucila Crexell, and the cousin of Silvia Sapag, both currently National Senators for Neuquén as well.

Sapag's first political position was as councilwoman in her town of residence, Caviahue-Copahue; she was elected in 2011. In 2013, she was appointed Undersecretary of Internal Coordination in the provincial government of her brother, Jorge Sapag, who was governor of Neuquén from 2007 to 2015. In 2015, she was elected to the provincial legislature, where she served as vice president of the chamber. She was elected to the Argentine Chamber of Deputies at the 2017 legislative election, she was the first candidate in the MPN list, and the only one elected.
