= Carmen Lucila Crexell =

Argentine politician

Carmen Lucila Crexell Sapag
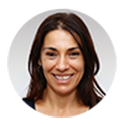

Ambassador of Argentina to Canada
- Incumbent
- Assumed office 29 April 2024
- Preceded by: Josefina Martínez Gramuglia

National Senator
- In office 10 December 2013 – 10 December 2025
- Constituency: Neuquén

Personal details
- Born: 10 August 1972 (age 54) Bahía Blanca, Argentina
- Party: Neuquén People's Movement
- Other political affiliations: Juntos por el Cambio (2019)
- Education: UADE

Carmen Lucila Crexell Sapag (born 10 August 1972) is an Argentine politician. She served as a National Senator for Neuquén Province from 2013 to 2025. She was a member of the Neuquén People's Movement (MPN).

Since June 2026, she has served as ambassador of Argentina to Canada.

== Early life and education ==
Crexell was born on 10 August 1972 in Bahía Blanca, Buenos Aires Province, and grew up in San Martín de los Andes. Her father was Guillermo Crexell, a businessman, and her mother was Luz María Sapag, a politician and scion of the Sapag family, one of Neuquén's most important political families.

Luz Sapag was also a Senator for Neuquén from 2001 to 2007, as was Crexell's grandfather, Elías Sapag. Guillermo Crexell was murdered in 1995 by two of his employees, while Luz died in 2010 in a car accident.

Crexell studied Public Relations at the Argentine University of Enterprise, graduating in 2001. She also completed a law degree from the same university in 2019.

== Political career ==
In 2008, Crexell was elected to the Constitutional Convention of San Martín de los Andes, tasked with drafting a new constitutional document for the municipality. Later, in 2011, she ran for the mayoralty for the Neuquén People's Movement (MPN). Although she won in the MPN primaries, she was defeated by the Justicialist Party candidate.

Ahead of the 2013 legislative election, she was invited by Guillermo Pereyra (secretary general of the Private Oil and Gas Union of Río Negro, Neuquén and La Pampa) to be the second candidate in his MPN list to the Argentine Senate. The Pereyra-Crexell ticket won in the primaries against the Pechen-Bertoya ticket, supported by Crexell's cousin, then-Neuquén governor Jorge Sapag. The MPN went on to win the most votes in the general election, allowing Crexell to be elected into the Senate.

In preparation for the 2019 general election, Crexell joined Juntos por el Cambio and agreed to be the second candidate in the JxC list, behind Horacio "Pechi" Quiroga. However, Quiroga died on 12 October 2019, just a week before election day. Although with 32.3% of the vote, Juntos por el Cambio did not receive enough votes to secure the two Senate seats, as Quiroga was dead, Crexell renewed her seat in his stead. Despite being elected for Juntos por el Cambio, Crexell remained nominally a member of the MPN, and currently leads the single-member Neuquén People's Movement bloc in the Senate.

Crexell is one of two members of the Sapag family currently serving in the National Congress of Argentina, alongside Silvia Sapag.

=== UNESCO ambassadorship scandal ===
In June 2024, Crexell was part of a national scandal when she announced, before the voting of the "Law of Bases and Starting Points for the Freedom of Argentines" (or Bases Law) proposed by President Javier Milei's administration took place in the Senate, that she would change her —initially negative— vote to a positive one while at the same time the government officially recommended her to occupy a seat as an Ambassador to UNESCO, in an apparent exchange for her positive vote on the project. Shortly after the Senate session and approval of the new Bases Law, Milei's administration officially admitted (through declarations of former party whip and current Deputy Oscar Zago) that Crexell's appointment to UNESCO was indeed a reward for her positive vote for the law, also considering in that regard that "there was no corruption" and that the alleged political deal was "part of the agreements and consensus" of the government with National Senators. Simultaneously, Crexell was prosecuted for bribery and the case ended up in judge Ariel Lijo's court.

In April 2026, following the completion of her term as senator, she was appointed as Ambassador of Argentina in Canada.
