= Pedro Salvatori =

Argentine politician

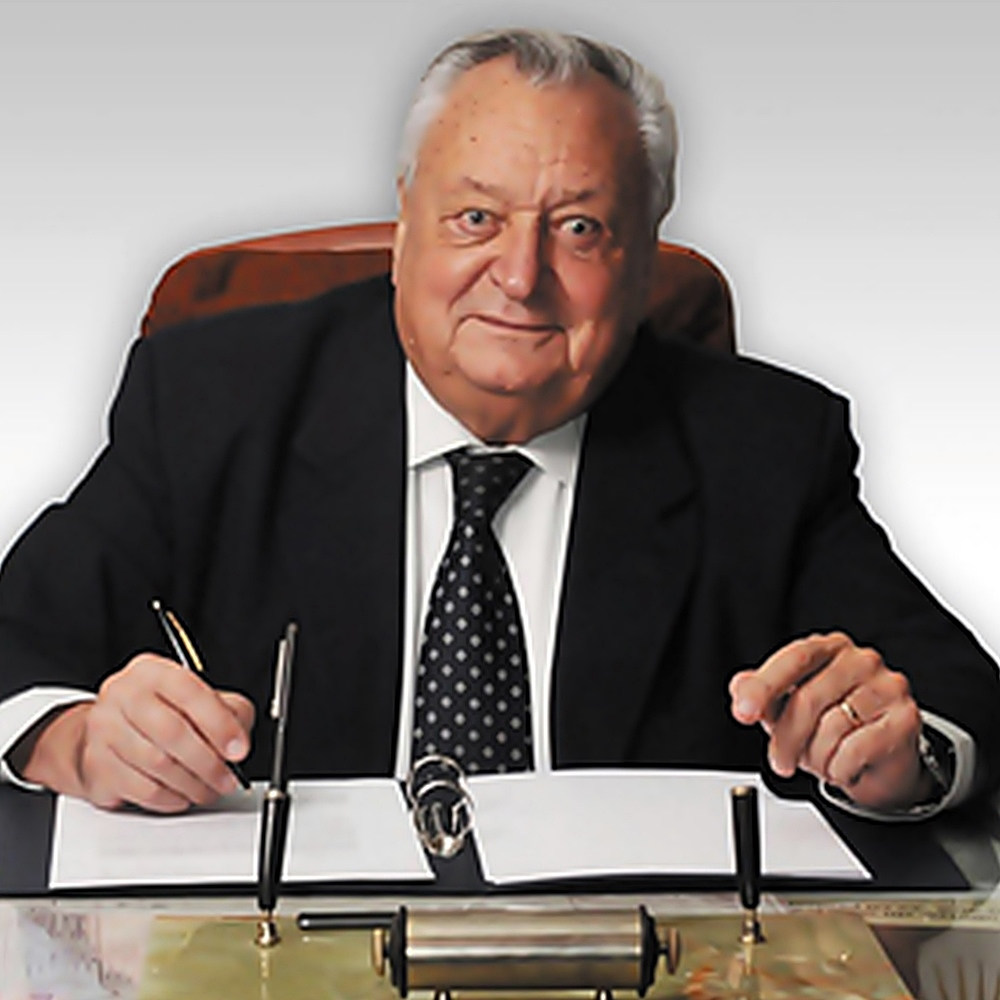

Governor of Neuquén
- In office 10 December 1987 – 10 December 1991
- Vice Governor: José Lucas Echegaray
- Preceded by: Felipe Sapag
- Succeeded by: Jorge Sobisch
- In office 1972 – 25 May 1973
- Preceded by: Felipe Sapag
- Succeeded by: Felipe Sapag

National Senator
- In office 10 December 2001 – 10 December 2007
- Constituency: Neuquén

National Deputy
- In office 10 December 1997 – 10 December 2001
- Constituency: Neuquén

Personal details
- Born: 22 December 1933 Plottier, Argentina
- Died: 24 March 2017 (aged 83) Neuquén, Argentina
- Party: Neuquén People's Movement
- Spouse: Nora Serrano
- Children: Four

Pedro Salvatori (22 November 1933 – 24 March 2017) was an Argentine politician and member of the Neuquén People's Movement, a regional party based in his home Neuquén Province. He served as the Governor of Neuquén Province from 1987 to 1991, as well as the de facto Governor of Neuquén briefly from 1972 to 1973 during the military rule.

Salvatori died of respiratory failure at the Policlínico Neuquen hospital in the city of Neuquén on 24 March 2017, at the age of 83. His death was announced on Twitter by the current Governor of Neuquén Province, Omar Gutiérrez, who declared two days of official mourning. He was buried in the Central Cemetery in Neuquén.
