= Rolando Figueroa =

Argentine politician

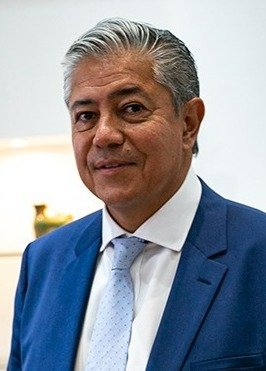

Governor of Neuquén
- Incumbent
- Assumed office 10 December 2023
- Vice Governor: Gloria Ruiz
- Preceded by: Omar Gutiérrez

National Deputy
- In office 10 December 2021 – 10 December 2023
- Constituency: Neuquén

Vice Governor of Neuquén
- In office 10 December 2015 – 10 December 2019
- Governor: Omar Gutiérrez
- Preceded by: Ana Pechen
- Succeeded by: Marcos Koopmann

Mayor of Chos Malal
- In office 10 December 2011 – 10 December 2015
- Succeeded by: Víctor Hugo Gutiérrez

Provincial Legislator of Neuquén
- In office 10 December 2007 – 10 December 2011

Personal details
- Born: 14 April 1969 (age 57) Andacollo, Argentina
- Party: Independent
- Other political affiliations: Neuquén People's Movement (until 2022)
- Education: National University of Comahue

Rolando Ceferino Figueroa (born 14 April 1969) is an Argentine politician, currently serving as a Governor of Neuquén Province since 10 December 2023. He previously served as National Deputy elected in Neuquén. A member of the regionalist Neuquén People's Movement party until 2022, Figueroa was elected in 2021 and currently sits in the Provincias Unidas inter-bloc.

Figueroa previously served as Vice Governor of Neuquén from 2015 to 2019, under Governor Omar Gutiérrez. Prior to that, he was mayor of Chos Malal from 2011 to 2015, and a member of the Legislature of Neuquén from 2007 to 2011.

He was elected governor in the April 2023 provincial elections.

== Early life and career ==
Figueroa was born on 14 April 1969 in Andacollo, Neuquén Province, into an important family in the province. His grandfather, Temístocles Figueroa, was the first native-born Argentine citizen in Neuquén, while his uncle, Rogelio Figueroa, was active in local politics in Huinganco and is widely known for promoting afforestation efforts in the region.

He studied public accounting at the National University of Comahue.

== Political career ==
From 2007 to 2011, Figueroa was a member of the Legislature of Neuquén elected in the Neuquén People's Movement list. In 2011, he was elected as intendente (mayor) of Chos Malal. In the 2015 provincial elections, Figueroa was the running mate of Omar Gutiérrez in the MPN ticket to the governorship of Neuquén: with 40.57% of the vote, the MPN maintained its unbroken streak as the province's governing party since the return of democracy in 1983.

=== National Deputy ===
In the 2021 legislative election, Figueroa ran for one of Neuquén's seats in the National Chamber of Deputies as part of the MPN list; he won in the PASO primaries against the list supported by Governor Gutiérrez in September 2021, and became the party's candidate ahead of the general election. In the general election, the MPN list was the most voted in the province, with 29.44% of the vote, and Figueroa was elected. He was the sole MPN deputy in the 2021–2023 term, and formed part of the "Provincias Unidas" parliamentary inter-bloc alongside other provincial parties such as Misiones' FRC and Río Negro's JSRN.

Political offices
| Preceded by Omar Gutiérrez | Governor of Neuquén; 2023–present | Incumbent |
