= Luz Sapag =

Argentine politician (1944–2010)

Luz María Sapag
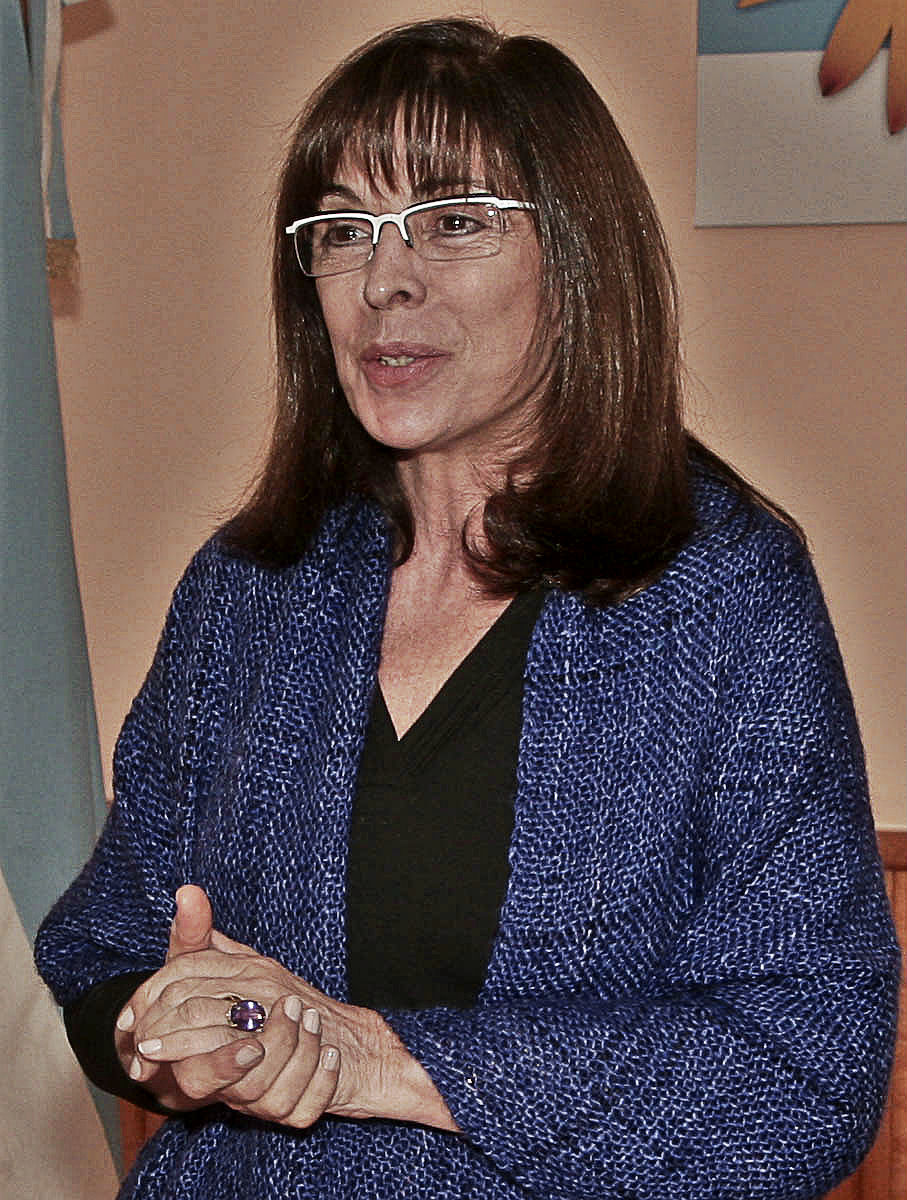
- Luz María Sapag

Mayor of San Martín de los Andes
- In office 10 December 2007 – 7 July 2010
- Preceded by: Jorge Carro
- Succeeded by: Cristina Frugoni
- In office 10 December 1991 – 10 December 1999

National Senator
- In office 10 December 2001 – 10 December 2007
- Constituency: Neuquén

Provincial Legislator of Neuquén
- In office 10 December 1999 – 10 December 2001

Personal details
- Born: Luz María Sapag; 15 June 1944 Cutral Có, Neuquén, Argentina
- Died: 7 June 2010 (aged 66) San Martín de los Andes, Argentina
- Political party: Neuquén People's Movement
- Children: Carmen Lucila Crexell

Luz María Sapag (15 June 1944 – 7 July 2010) was an Argentine politician, Mayor of the city of San Martín de los Andes and formerly a Senator representing the Neuquén Province under the aegis of the Neuquino People's Movement.

Sapag was born in Cutral Có, Neuquén. She was a member of the influential Arab Argentine Sapag family – daughter of Elías Sapag, a senator; niece of Felipe Sapag, five-time governor of Neuquén; and sister to Jorge Sapag, governor of Neuquén from 2007.

She became secretary of government of the municipality of San Martín de los Andes in 1987, and in 1991 became Mayor of the city. She was re-elected in 1995, and in 1999 was elected to the Provincial Legislature.

Luz Sapag was elected to the Senate in 2001, and later served as president of the Environmental Committee. In June 2006, prosecutors in Neuquén asked the Argentine Congress to lift her immunity so that she could face trial for abuse of office whilst Mayor of San Martín de los Andes.

In June 2007 she was re-elected Mayor of San Martín de los Andes and stepped down from the Senate.

Sapag died in a road accident in San Martín de los Andes in the morning of 7 July 2010.

One of Sapag's daughters, Carmen Lucila Crexell, went on to be elected to the Argentine Senate for Neuquén as well.
