= Governor of Neuquén Province =

- Provincial coat of Arms

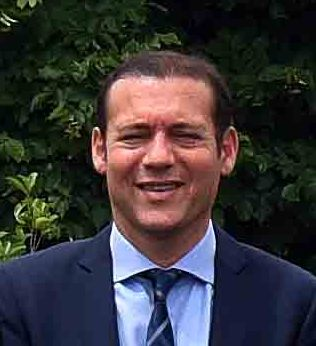
- Incumbent; Omar Gutiérrez since 10 December 2015
- Appointer: Direct popular vote
- Term length: 4 years
- Inaugural holder: Manuel José Olascoaga

The Governor of Neuquén is a citizen of the Neuquén Province, in Argentina, holding the office of governor for the corresponding period. The governor is elected alongside a vice-governor. Currently the governor of Neuquén is Omar Gutiérrez.

== Governors since 1983 ==
Governor	Term in office	Party	Election	Vice Governor
Felipe Sapag	10 December 1983 – 10 December 1987	MPN	1983	Horacio Forni
Pedro Salvatori	10 December 1987 – 10 December 1991	MPN	1987	José Lucas Echegaray
Jorge Sobisch	10 December 1991 – 10 December 1995	MPN	1991	Felipe Rodolfo Sapag
Felipe Sapag	10 December 1995 – 10 December 1999	MPN	1995	Ricardo Corradi
Jorge Sobisch	10 December 1999 – 10 December 2007	MPN	1999	Jorge Sapag
Jorge Sobisch	10 December 1999 – 10 December 2007	MPN	2003	Federico Brollo
Jorge Sapag	10 December 2007 – 10 December 2015	MPN	2007	Ana Pechen
Jorge Sapag	10 December 2007 – 10 December 2015	MPN	2011	Ana Pechen
Omar Gutiérrez	10 December 2015 – 10 December 2023	MPN	2015	Rolando Figueroa
Omar Gutiérrez	10 December 2015 – 10 December 2023	MPN	2019	Marcos Koopmann
Rolando Figueroa	10 December 2023 – incumbent	Comunidad	2015	Gloria Ruiz

== See also ==
- Legislature of Neuquén
