= Ana Pechen =

Argentine biochemist and politician

Vice Governor of Neuquén
- In office 10 December 2007 – 10 December 2015
- Governor: Jorge Sapag
- Preceded by: Federico Brollo
- Succeeded by: Rolando Figueroa

Personal details
- Born: 19 June 1949 (age 77) Bahía Blanca, Argentina
- Party: Neuquén People's Movement
- Education: Universidad Nacional del Sur

Ana María Pechen de D'Angelo (born 19 June 1949) is an Argentine biochemist and former politician who served as Vice Governor of Neuquén Province from 2007 to 2015, under Governor Jorge Sapag. She also served as rector of the National University of Comahue (UNCo) from 2002 to 2006.

== Early life and education ==
Born in Bahía Blanca, Buenos Aires, Pechen studied biochemistry at the Universidad Nacional del Sur, graduating with a licenciatura and later completing her PhD in the same university in 1976.

== Career ==
She later became a professor at the UNCo, in Neuquén. In addition, she is a scholar at the National Scientific and Technical Research Council.

In the 2007 provincial elections, she was the running mate of Jorge Sapag in the Neuquén People's Movement (MPN) ticket to the governorship of Neuquén. The MPN ticket won 48.27% of the vote, and upon taking office on 10 December 2007, she became the first female vice governor of Neuquén. As vice governor, Pechen was the constitutionally-recognized president of the provincial legislature. Sapag and Pechen were re-elected in 2011 with 48.88% of the vote. Ahead of the 2013 legislative election, she unsuccessfully ran to be the MPN's senatorial candidate, ultimately losing to Guillermo Pereyra.

Following the end of her second term, Pechen retired from electoral politics and returned to her research positions. She currently works as a lavender producer.

Political offices
Preceded by Federico Brollo	Vice Governor of Neuquén; 2007–2015	Succeeded by Rolando Figueroa
