= Cutral Có Airport =

Airport in Argentina

Cutral Có Airport Aeropuerto de Cutral Có
- IATA: CUT; ICAO: SAZW

Summary
- Airport type: Public
- Serves: Cutral Có
- Elevation AMSL: 2,133 ft / 650 m
- Coordinates: 38°56′23″S 69°15′53″W

Map
- Location in Argentina

Runways
Direction	Length		Surface
Direction	ft	m	Surface
03/21	4,052	1,235
07/25	5,558	1,694	Asphalt
- Sources: World Aero Data

Cutral Có Airport (IATA: CUT, ICAO: SAZW) is an airport serving Cutral Có, Neuquén province, Argentina. The airport covers and area of 260 hectares (640 acres), and has a 400-square-metre (4,300 sq ft) covered terminal.

== Accidents and incidents ==
- 14 April 1976: A Yacimientos Petrolíferos Fiscales Avro 748, registration LV-HHB, that was transferring staff between Rincón de los Sauces and Cutral Có, crashed 35 kilometres (22 mi) north of the intended destination. The aircraft was approximately half an hour into the flight, at 4,000 feet (1,200 m), when both the starboard wing and the starboard horizontal stabiliser detached from the fuselage, causing the aircraft to corkscrew to the ground, crashing and bursting into flames. All 34 occupants of the aircraft — 31 passengers and a crew of three — died in the accident.

== See also ==
- List of airports in Argentina
