= Gabriela Arroyo =

Argentine politician (born 1957)

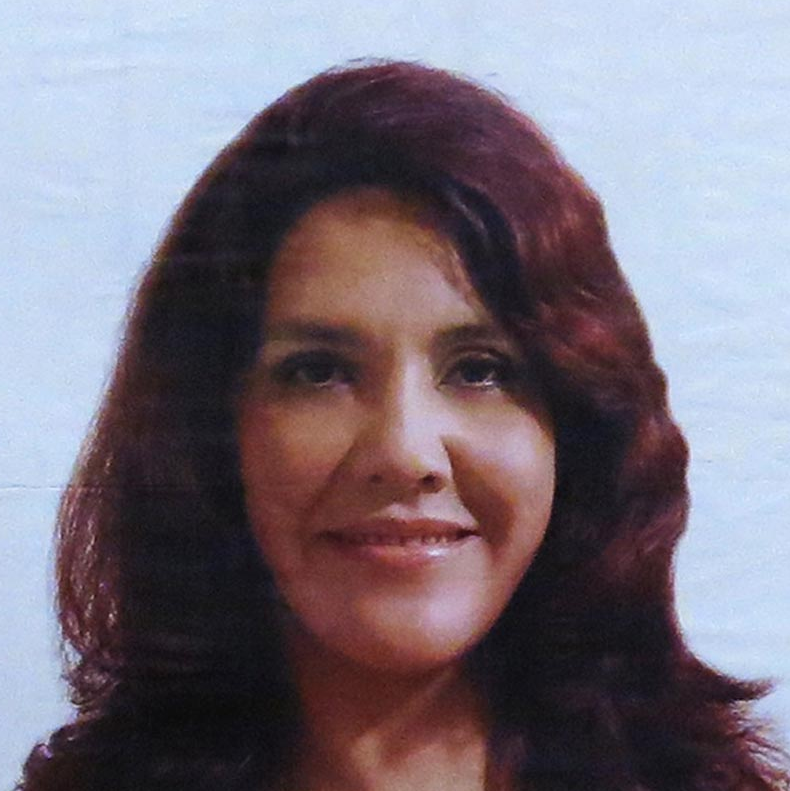
Portrait of Gabriella Arroyo

Gabriela Arroyo (born 9 January 1957 in Buenos Aires) is a former member of the Workers' Party of Argentina (Partido Obrero).

She was its candidate for Vice President of Argentina in the 2007 Argentine general election.
