= Jorge Asís =

Argentine writer and politician

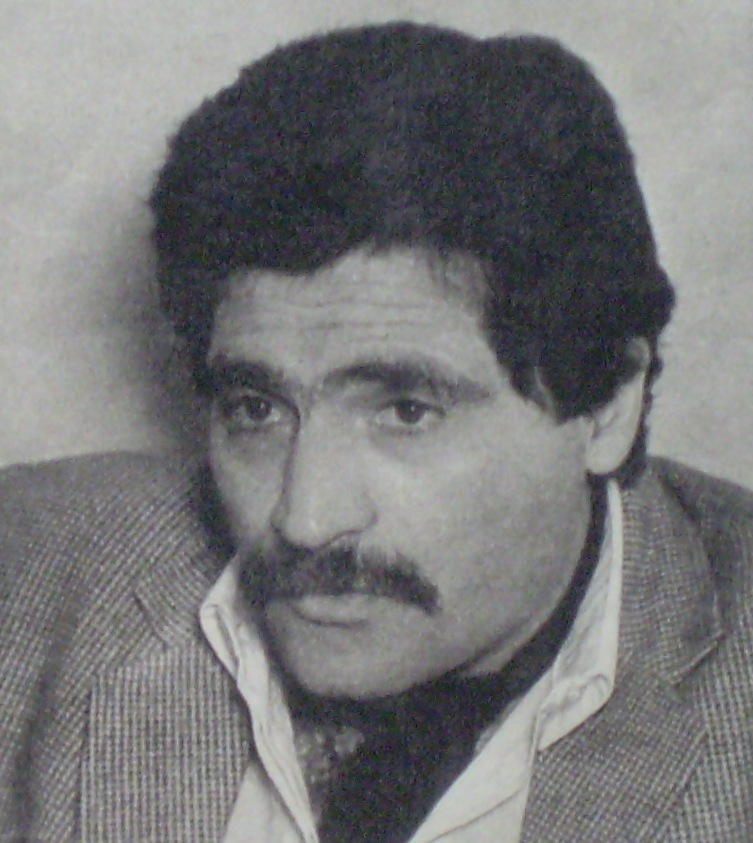
Jorge Asís in 1976, source: Gente y la actualidad magazine. October/December 1983. Buenos Aires, Argentina

Jorge Cayetano Zaín Asís (3 March 1946, Avellaneda) is an Argentine writer, journalist and politician. His literary career took off in the 1970s, when he published a daily column in Clarín, and published a number of novels that dealt with youth, sex, politics, and the everyday life of the poor and working classes in modern Argentina. While some of his books expressed sympathy for the victims of the military junta of 1976-1983, he was later also accused of having collaborated with the regime. In the 1980s he became directly involved in politics and occupied a number of positions during the government of Carlos Menem. He ran as a vice-presidential candidate in 2007 on a ticket that finished 6th in the elections.

== Biography ==
Asís was born in Avellaneda, a working/middle-class suburb of Buenos Aires, to a family of Syrian Syriac Orthodox immigrants. From his youth he was drawn to literature and political activism.

Among his first major books is Los reventados ("The down-and-out"), a novella about sundry characters seeking to make easy money in the context of Juan Perón's return to Argentina in 1973. Some characters witness the 20 June 1973 Ezeiza massacre, which is narrated from their point of view.

During the 1970s, Asís (using the pen name Oberdán Rocamora) published a daily column in the daily Clarín, in the tradition of Roberto Arlt. In 1978, he reported (as Rocamora) from the South American rally where he ran as co-pilot of a stock Citroen car.

Asís rose to fame in 1980 with Flores robadas en los jardines de Quilmes ("Flowers stolen in the gardens of Quilmes"), which relates the adventures of several young people experimenting with sex, careers, and politics in 1970s Argentina, centered on the narrator's relationship with a young woman from Quilmes, who eventually decides to leave the country. The book was dedicated to Haroldo Conti, who was already a "desaparecido" at the time, and included bolder than accepted political statements in the era of the military junta's dictatorship. That book became the first part of a trilogy named Canguros (lit. "Kangaroos") that dealt with everyday life in Greater Buenos Aires, sometimes from a lumpenproletariat perspective.

In 1984, Asís released Diario de la Argentina ("Argentina's Newspaper"), a roman à clef about his days in Clarín. Major newspapers were not thrilled to have their inner conflicts aired in public, and (informally) boycotted Asís and his work for several years.

During the 1980s, Asís became more involved in politics. He regularly attended meetings with intelligence operatives, which became the basis for the 1987 novel Partes de inteligencia ("Intelligence Reports"). During Raúl Alfonsín's presidency, Asís gravitated towards the Justicialist Party, and specifically supported presidential candidate Carlos Menem. When Menem became President of Argentina in 1989, Asís was appointed to several government and diplomatic posts, including ambassador to UNESCO, Secretary of Culture, and ambassador to Portugal.

After Menem's ten years as president, Asís remained in politics, and became a sought-after commentator in print, radio and TV, where his rich language and his flamboyancy set him apart from the more formal tone of most politicians. In the 2007 presidential election, Asís ran for vice president sharing a ticket with Jorge Sobisch, a former governor of Neuquén province. The ticket attained approximately 1.6% of the national vote, finishing in sixth place.

The social realism of his earlier works was seen by some critics as "collaborationism" with the dictatorship, owing to the success of Flores robadas en los jardines de Quilmes during the regime. His style has been judged to resemble the nineteenth-century realistic novel.

== Books ==
=== Novels ===
- La manifestación (1971)
- Don Abdel Zalim, El burlador de Domínico (1972)
- La familia tipo (1974)
- Los reventados (1974)
- Flores robadas en los jardines de Quilmes (1980)
- Carne Picada (1981)
- La calle de los caballos muertos (1982)
- Canguros (1983)
- Diario de la Argentina (1984)
- El pretexto de París (1986)
- Partes de inteligencia (1987)
- Cuaderno del acostado (1988)
- El cineasta y la partera (y el sociólogo marxista que murió de amor) (1989)
- La línea de Hamlet o la ética de la traición (1995)
- Sandra, la trapera (1996)
- Lesca, el fascista irreductible (2000)
- Del Flore Al Montparnasse (2000)
- Excelencias de la NADA (2001)
- Cuentos Completos (2005)
- Hombre de Gris (2012)
- Casa Casta (2012)
- Tulipanes salvajes en agua de rosas (2012)
- Dulces otoñales (2014)
- Memorias tergiversadas (2017)

=== Short stories ===
- La manifestación (1971)
- Fe de ratas (1976)

=== Poetry ===
- Señorita vida (1970)

=== Non-fiction ===
- El Buenos Aires de Oberdán Rocamora (1981)
- La Ficción Política (1985)
- La Marroquinería Política (2006)
- El Descascaramiento (2007)
- La elegida y el elegidor (2008)
