= 2007 Argentine general election =

- 28 October 2007
- Presidential election
- Registered: 27,137,719
- Turnout: 76.20%
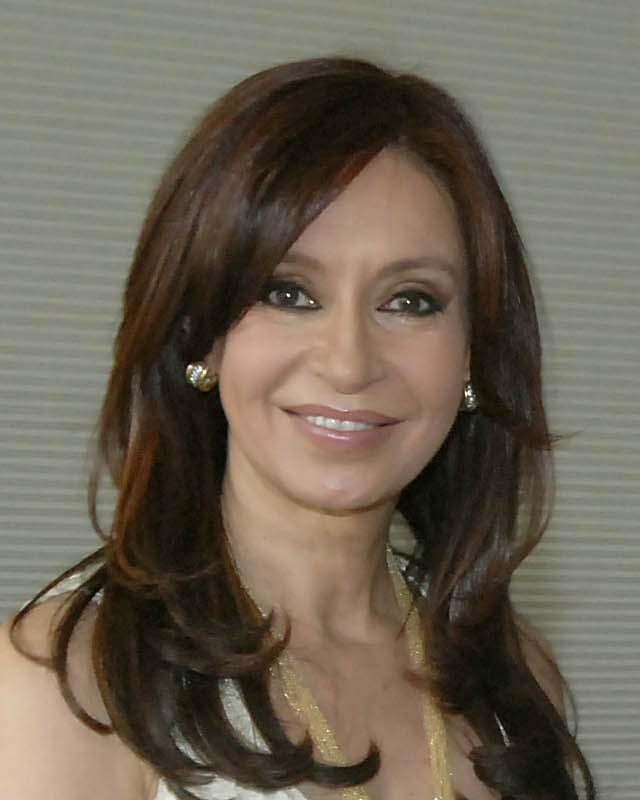

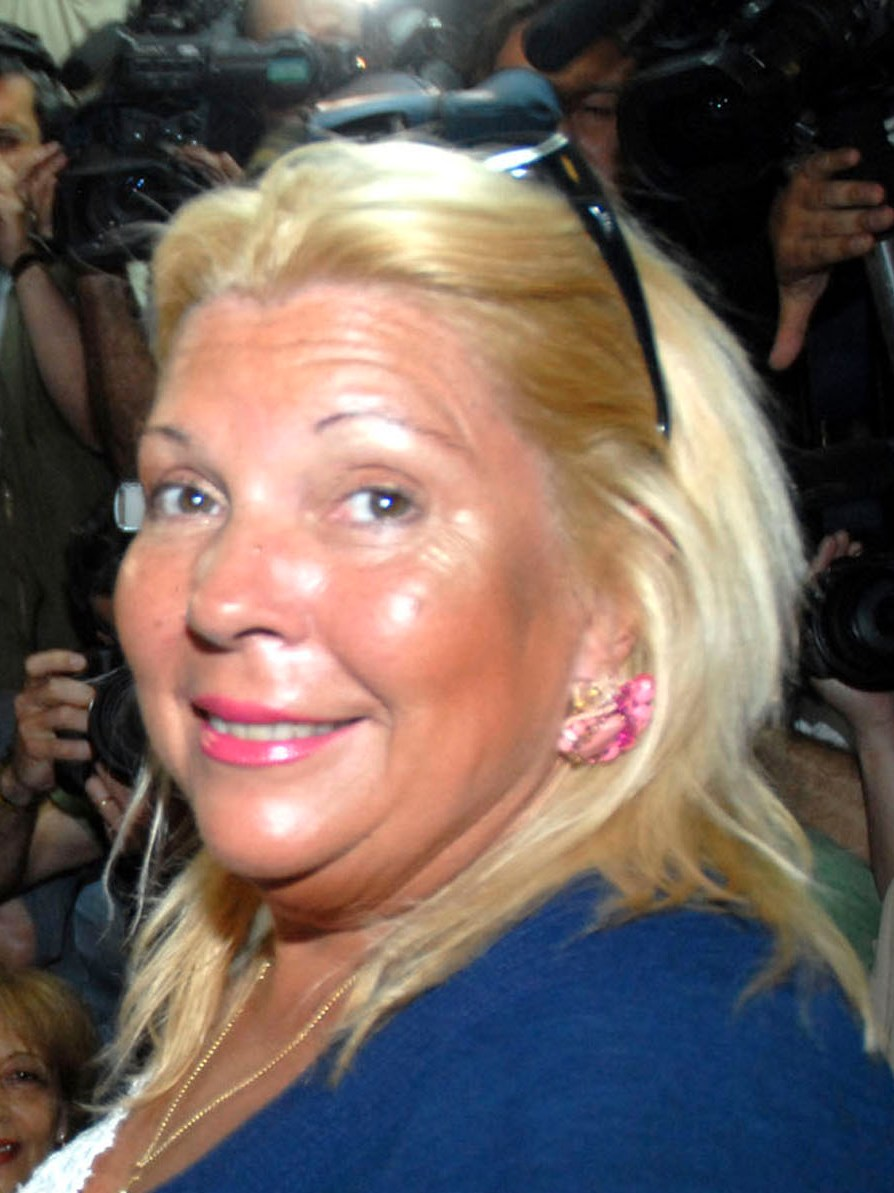

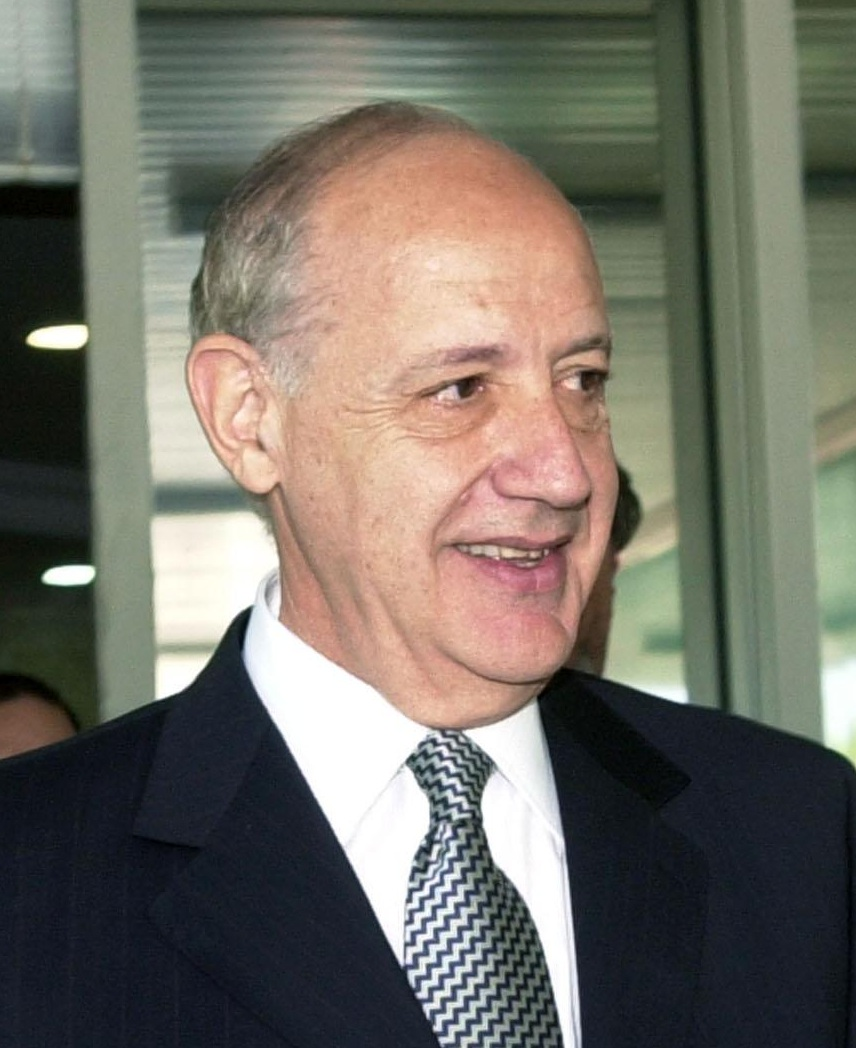

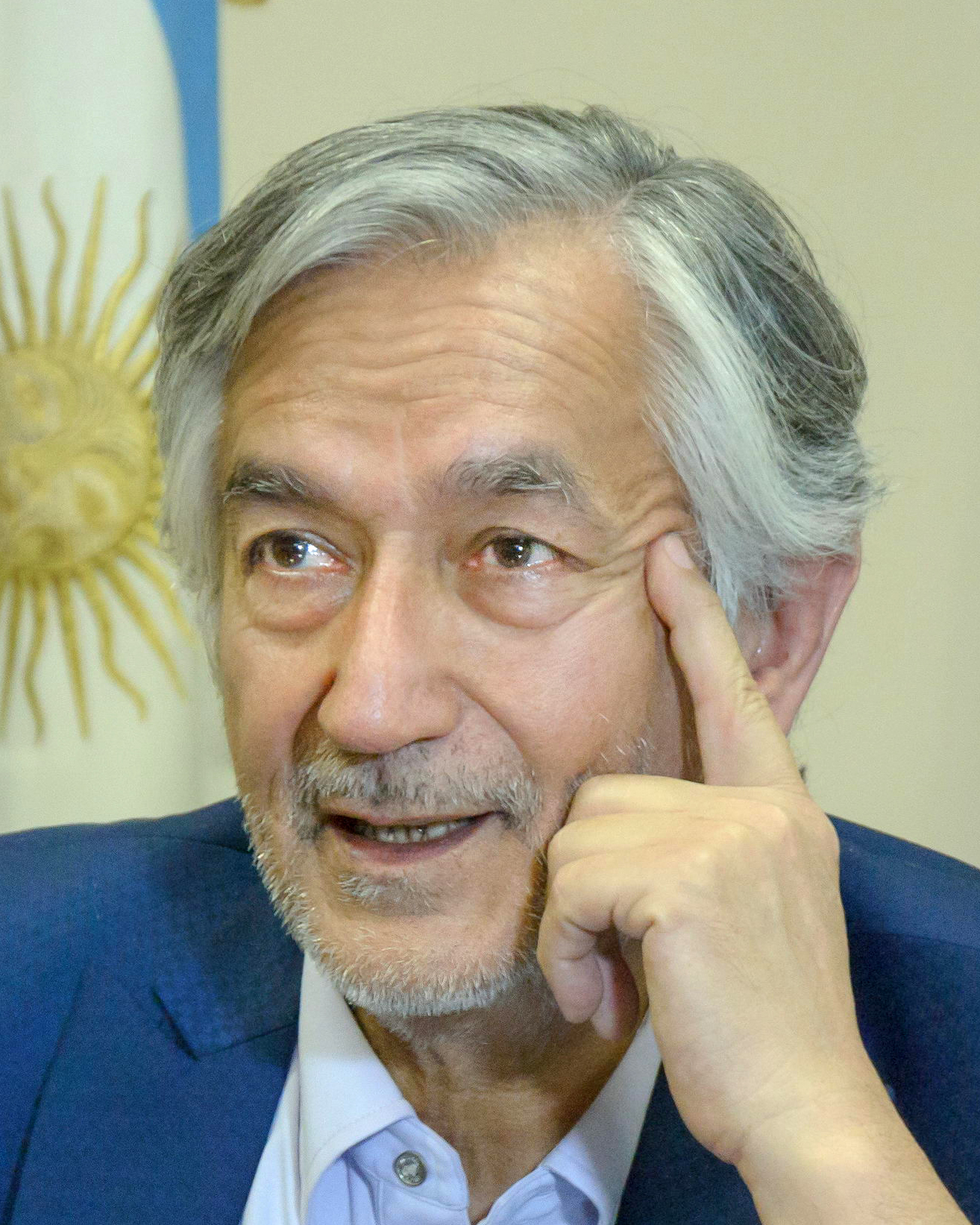
Nominee	Cristina Fernández de Kirchner	Elisa Carrió
Party	PJ	CC-ARI
Alliance	FPV-PJ	Civic Coalition
Running mate	Julio Cobos	Rubén Giustiniani
Popular vote	8,652,293	5,168,481
Percentage	45.28%	27.05%
Nominee	Roberto Lavagna	Alberto Rodríguez Saá
Party	UCR	PJ
Alliance	UNA	FREJULI
Running mate	Gerardo Morales	Héctor María Maya
Popular vote	3,402,981	1,459,174
Percentage	17.81%	7.64%
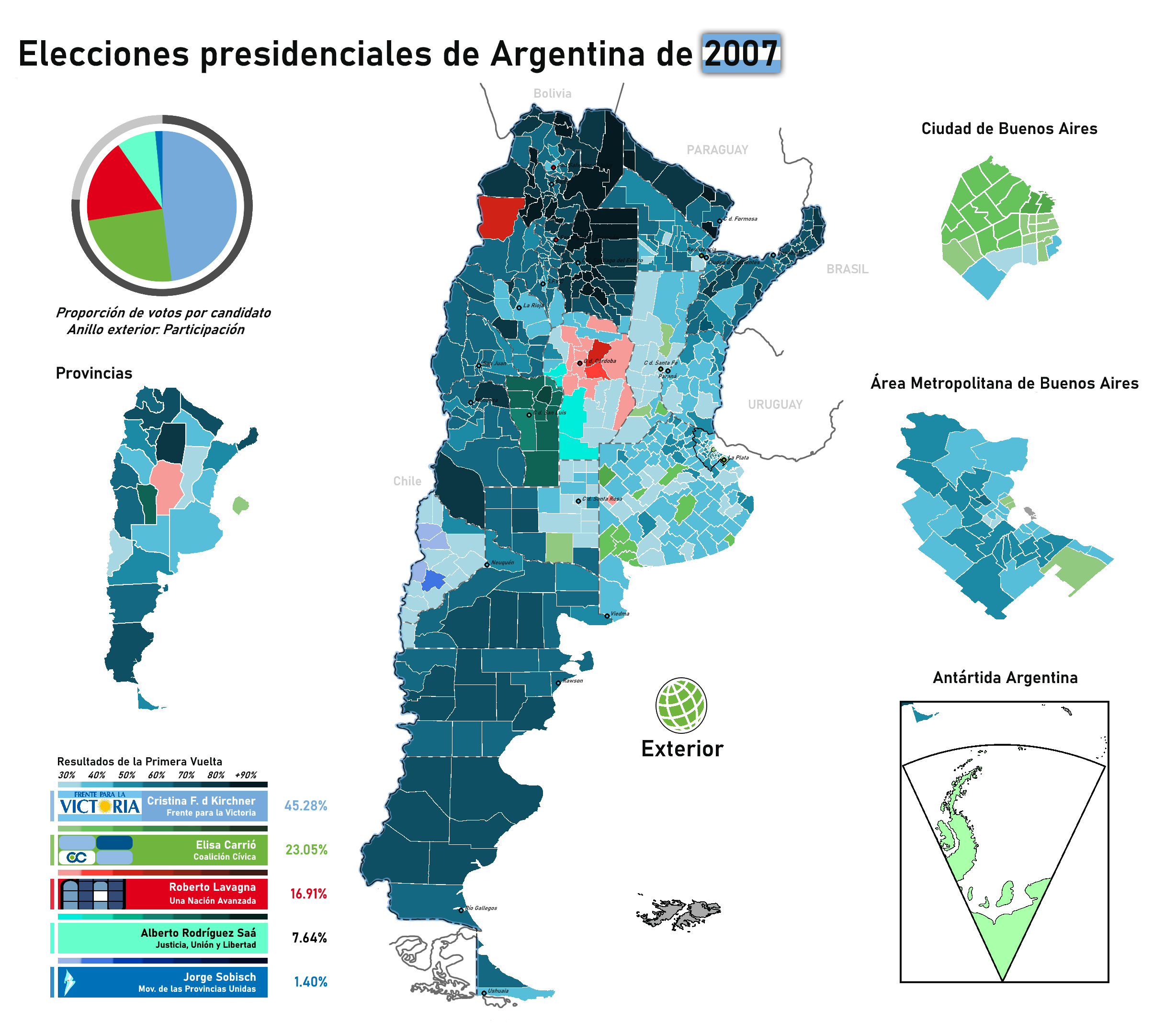
- Results by province and department
President before election
Néstor Kirchner
FPV-PJ
Elected President
Cristina Fernández de Kirchner
FPV-PJ
- Chamber of Deputies
- 130 of the 254 seats in the Chamber of Deputies
- Turnout: 76.21%
Party	Vote %	Seats	+/–
Front for Victory	41.22	84	+14
Civic Coalition	16.47	23	+10
Consensus for an Advanced Nation	13.26	12	−7
Republican Proposal	5.33	6	−3
Justice, Union and Freedom Front	4.70	3	−8
Proyecto Sur	1.70	1	+1
Neuquén People's Movement	0.25	1	−1
This lists parties that won seats. See the complete results below.
- Senate
- 27 of the 75 seats in the Senate
- Turnout: 73.93%
Party	Vote %	Seats	+/–
Front for Victory	45.33	17	0
Civic Coalition	19.74	4	+4
Consensus for an Advanced Nation	14.30	2	−1
Neuquén People's Movement	1.21	1	+1
This lists parties that won seats. See the complete results below.
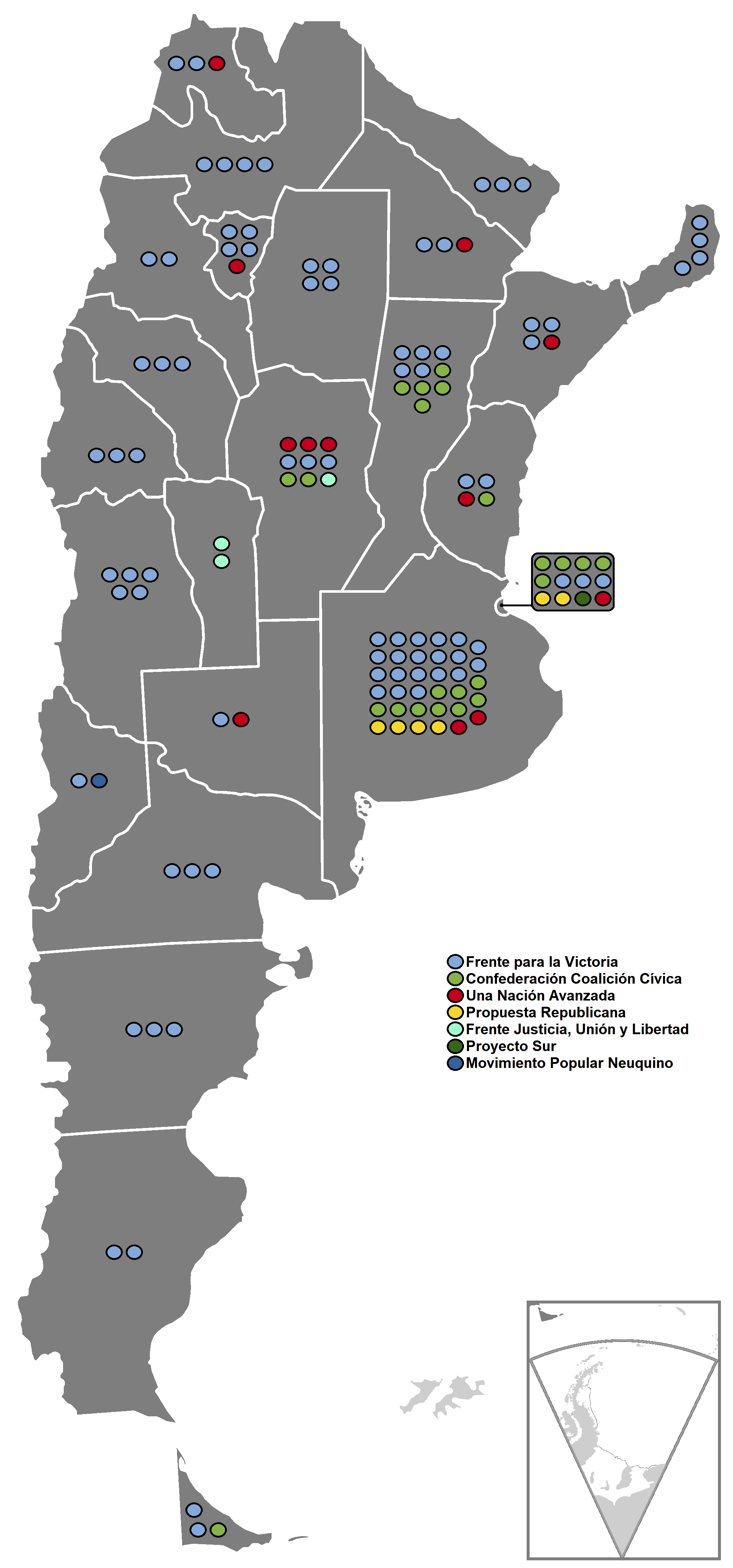
Chamber of Deputies results by province

General elections were held in Argentina on Sunday, 28 October 2007 to elect the president and members of the National Congress, while elections for provincial governors took place on staggered dates throughout the year. For the national elections, each of the 23 provinces and the Autonomous City of Buenos Aires are considered electoral districts. Voter turnout was 76.2%. Buenos Aires Province Senator and First Lady Cristina Fernández de Kirchner of the Front for Victory won the election by 45.28% of votes against Elisa Carrió of Civic Coalition ARI, making her the second female president of Argentina and the first female president to be directly elected. She broke the 40 percent barrier and won in the first round. Elisa Carrió won in the city of Buenos Aires and came second with more than 20 percent of the votes. Third was Roberto Lavagna, who won in Córdoba.

== Background ==
Elections for a successor to President Néstor Kirchner were held in October. Kirchner, although not term-limited, had declined to run for a second term. Kirchner's wife, Cristina Fernández de Kirchner, ran instead to succeed him. To enhance his wife's electoral prospects, Kirchner pressured the national statistics agency to manipulate economic numbers to make the economy appear stronger than it was.

In addition to the President, each district elected a number of members of the Lower House (the Chamber of Deputies) roughly proportional to their population, and eight districts elected members to the Argentine Senate, where each district is entitled to three senators (two for the majority, one for the largest minority party). In most provinces, the national elections were conducted in parallel with local ones, whereby a number of municipalities elect legislative officials (concejales) and in some cases also a mayor (or the equivalent executive post). Each provincial election follows local regulations and some, such as Tucumán, hold municipal elections on other dates in the year.

According to the rules for elections in Argentina, to win the presidential election without needing a "ballotage" round, a candidate needs either more than 45% of the valid votes, or more than 40% of the valid votes with a margin of 10 points from the runner-up. Following months of speculation, and despite high approval ratings, President Kirchner confirmed his decision to forfeit the 2007 race, and the ruling Front for Victory (FpV), a center-left Peronist Party, nominated the First Lady and Senator Cristina Fernández de Kirchner, on July 19. Acknowledging the support of a growing number of UCR figures ("K Radicals") to the populist policies advanced by Kirchnerism, the FpV nominated Mendoza Province Governor Julio Cobos as her running mate.

The ideologically diverse field also included former Economy Minister Roberto Lavagna (who broke with Kirchner in late 2005, obtained the endorsement of the UCR, and ran slightly to the right of the FpV), Elisa Carrió (a center-left Congresswoman close to the Catholic Church), and numerous conservatives and socialists; in all, fourteen candidates registered for the election. The UCR, for the first time since it first ran in a presidential campaign in 1892, joined a coalition (Lavagna's UNA) rather than nominate its own candidate.

The President, who had maintained high approval ratings throughout his term on the heels of a strong recovery in the Argentine economy, was beset by controversies during 2007, including Commerce Secretary Guillermo Moreno's firing of Graciela Bevacqua (the INDEC statistician overseeing inflation data), allegations of Planning Minister Julio de Vido's involvement in a Skanska bribery case, and the "suitcase scandal." These controversies, however, did not ultimately overshadow positive consumer sentiment and a generally high presidential job approval.

The Front for Victory's candidate, Senator and First Lady Cristina Fernández de Kirchner, maintained a comfortable lead in polling during the campaign. Her opponents focused on forcing her into a ballotage. However, with 13 challengers splitting the vote, Fernández won a decisive first-round victory with 45.3% of the valid votes, more than 22 points ahead of runner-up Carrió. She won in every province or district except San Luis (won by Alberto Rodríguez Saá), Córdoba (won by Lavagna), and the City of Buenos Aires (won by Carrió). Carrió, who obtained 23%, made history as the first runner-up to another woman in a national election in the Americas.

== Presidential candidates ==
A total of 14 candidates were on the presidential ballot, although only 3 or 4 garnered statistically significant amounts of support in polls. The candidates were as follows:

- Cristina Fernández de Kirchner: A center-left Peronist, wife of then-president Néstor Kirchner and his chosen successor, since he declined to run for reelection. She won the presidency in the first round with about 45% of the vote.
- Elisa Carrió: A former Radical Civic Union lawmaker who left the party after President Fernando de la Rúa abandoned his left-wing allies. She participated in the 2003 election and reached fifth place. Close to the influential Catholic Church, she ran a center-left platform with running mate Rubén Héctor Giustiniani and came in second with about 23% of the vote.
- Roberto Lavagna: Former Minister of Economy under Néstor Kirchner, who broke ranks with the president in late 2005. He received support from moderate Peronists and was endorsed by the centrist Radical Civic Union, in lieu of putting forth a candidate themselves. He ran on a platform described as "center-progressive" and came in third, with 17% of the vote. His running mate was Gerardo Rubén Morales.
- Alberto Rodríguez Saá: Governor of San Luis Province. He represented conservative Peronists opposed to Néstor Kirchner. His running mate was Héctor María Maya.
- Fernando Solanas: The renowned film maker represented the Authentic Socialist Party. Running mate: Ángel Francisco Cadelli.
- Jorge Omar Sobisch: Governor of Neuquén Province. Representing various conservative regional parties. Running mate: Jorge Asís.
- Ricardo López Murphy: Representing the center-right Recreate for Growth party, in alliance with the Republican Proposal party of newly elected Buenos Aires mayor Mauricio Macri. He previously ran in the 2003 election, reaching third place. Running mate: Esteban Bullrich.
- Vilma Ripoll: Running mate: Héctor Bidonde, both longtime Socialists.
- Néstor Pitrola: Representing the Trotskyist Workers' Party. Running mate: Gabriela Adriana Arroyo.
- José Alberto Montes: A Trotskyist who opposed privatizations under Carlos Menem. His running mate was Héctor Antonio Heberling.
- Luis Alberto Ammann: Representing the Humanist Party-led Broad Front Towards Latin American Unity Alliance. Running mate: Rogelio Deleonardi.
- Raúl Castells: A piquetero (poverty activist) who participated in various incidents. His running mate was his wife, Nina Pelozo.
- Gustavo Luis Breide Obeid: A right-wing nationalist who participated in a failed coup against Carlos Menem in 1990. Running mate: Héctor Raúl Vergara.
- Juan Ricardo Mussa: Perennial candidate and self-styled "traditional" Peronist. Running mate: Bernardo Nespral.
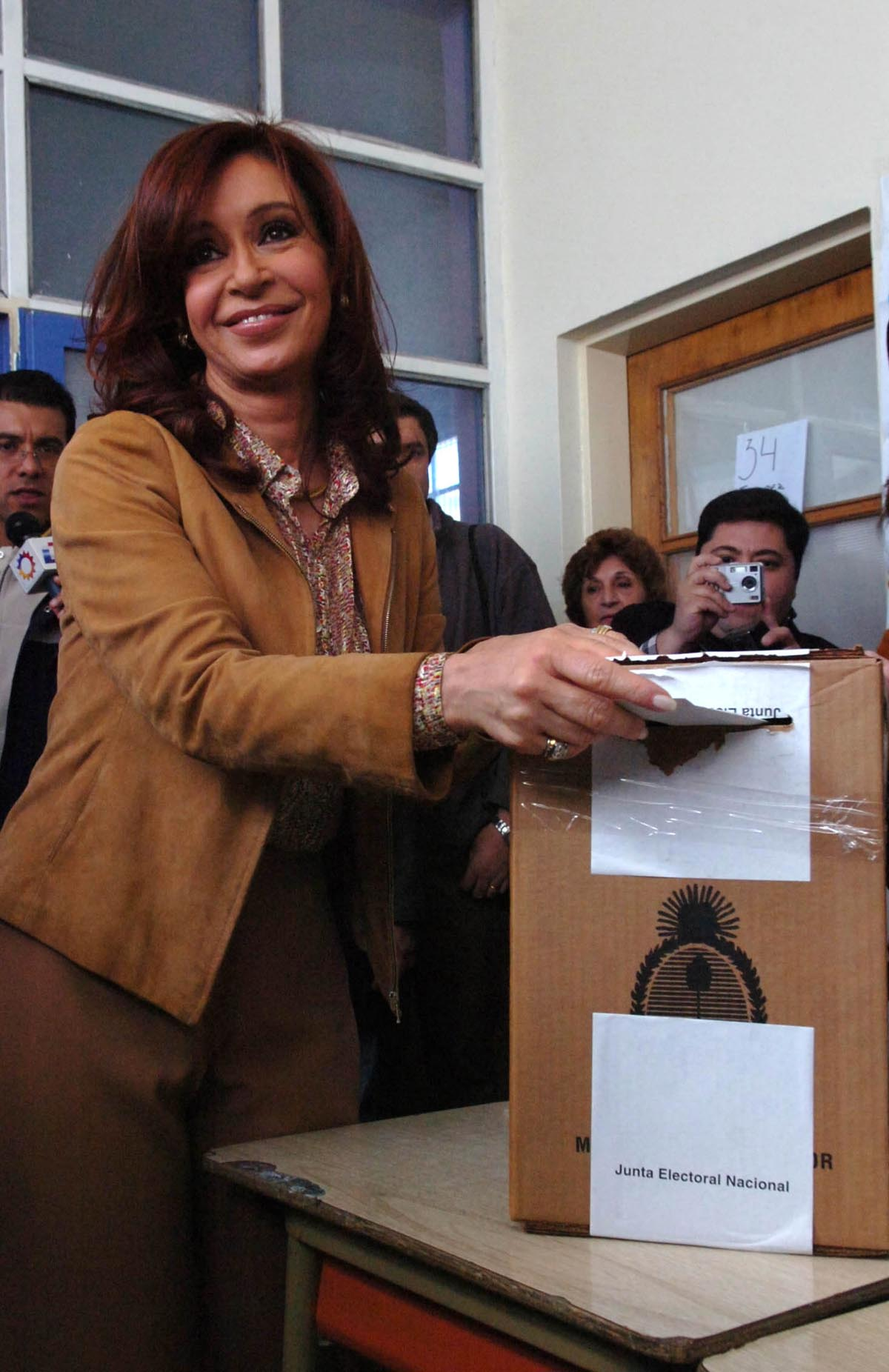
Kirchner

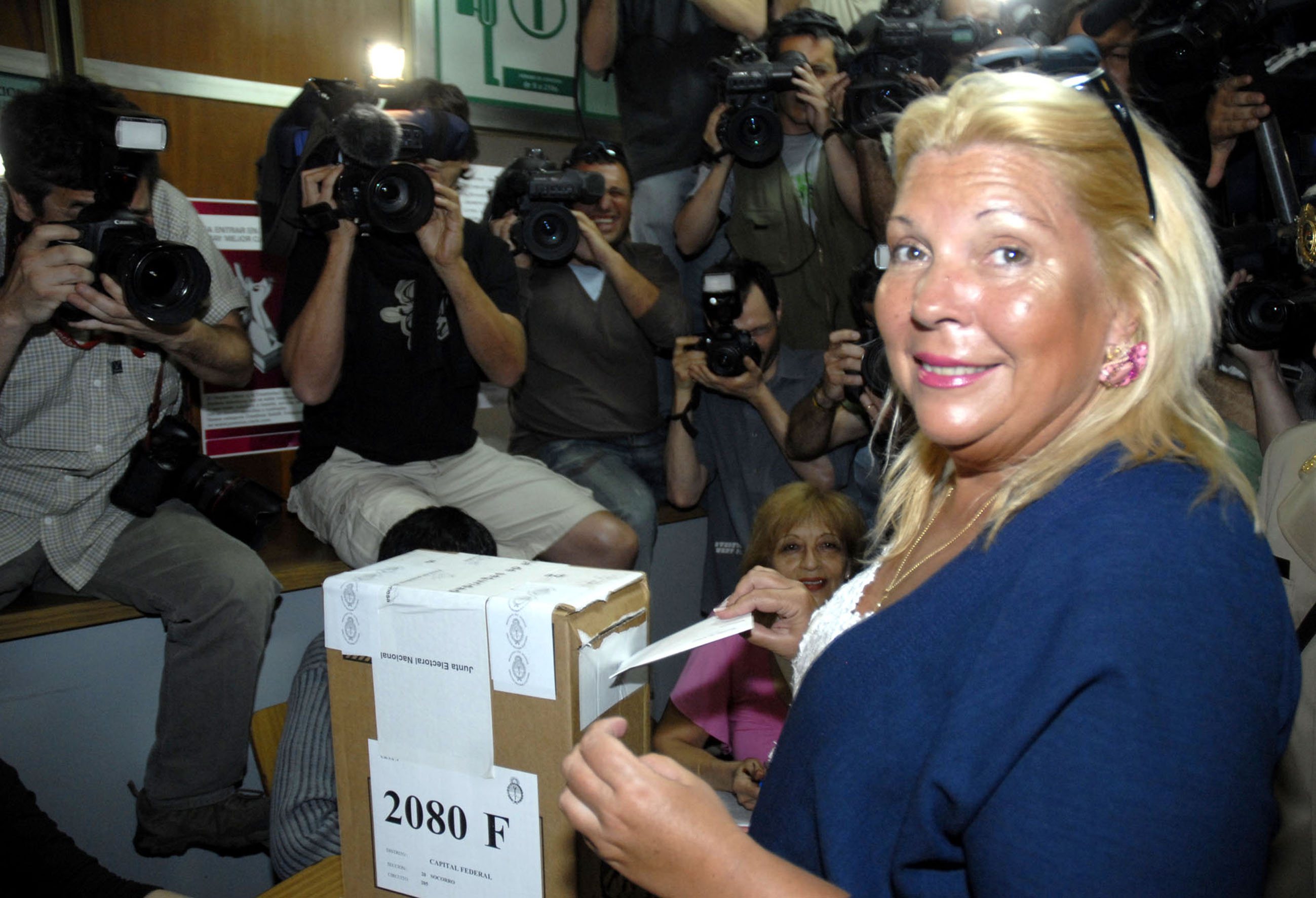
Carrió

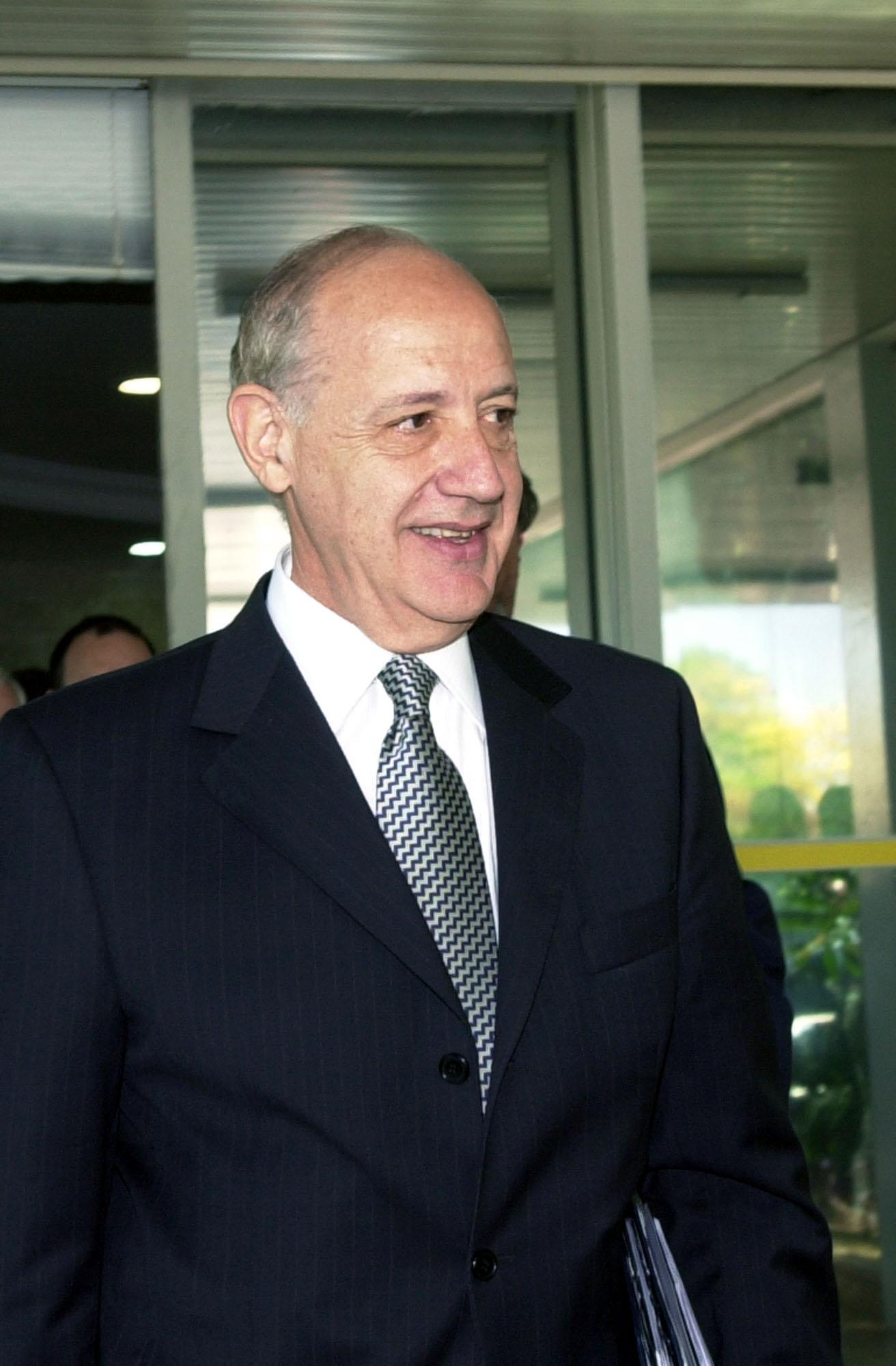
Lavagna

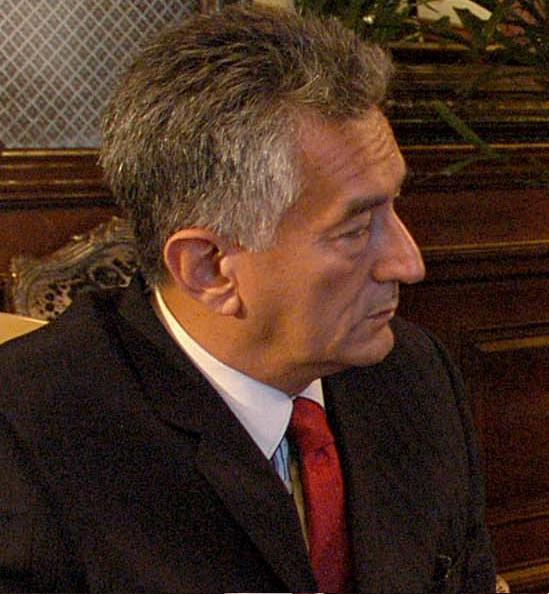
Rodríguez Saá

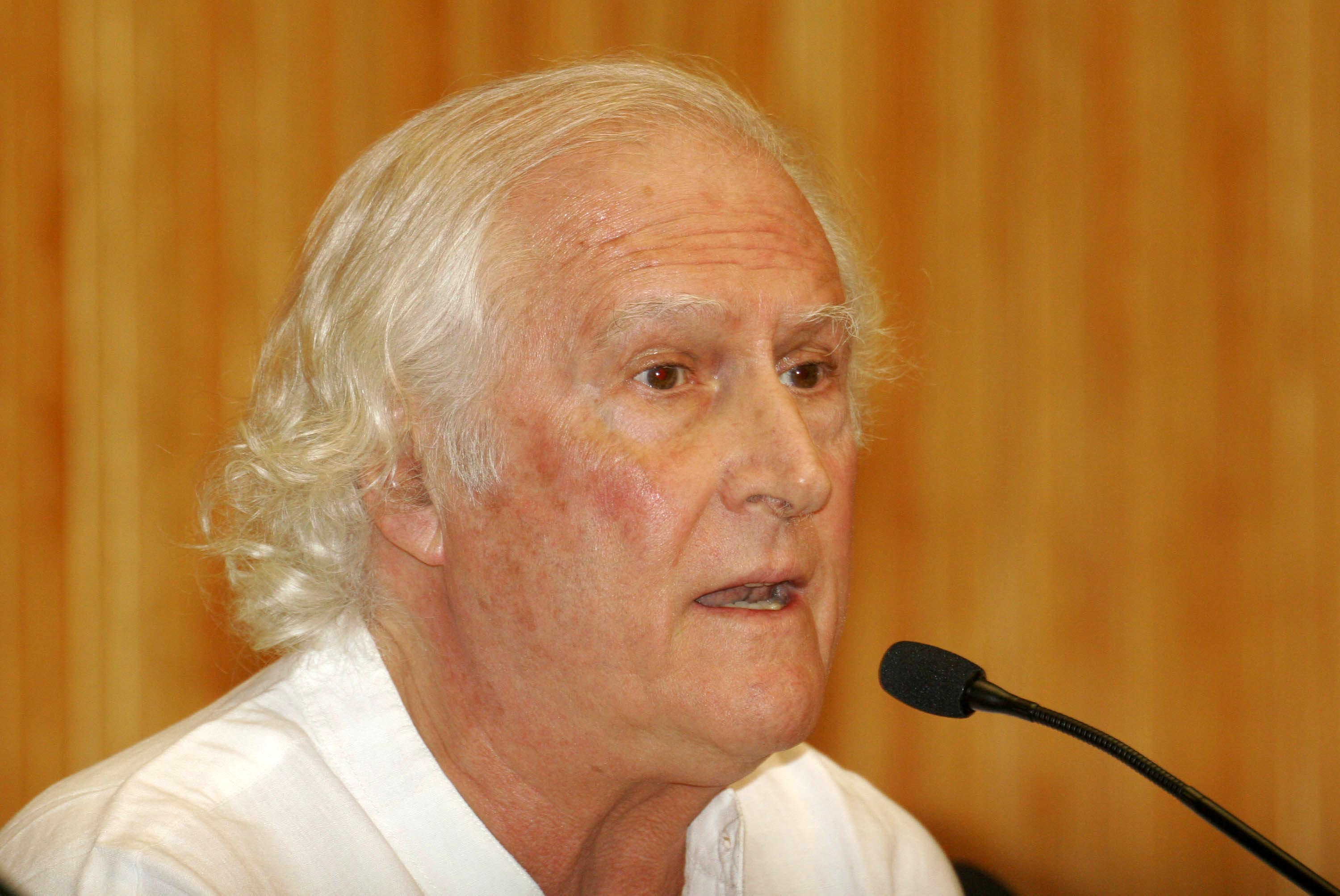
Solanas

== Results ==
=== President ===
Candidate	Running mate	Party or alliance		Votes	%
Cristina Fernández de Kirchner	Julio Cobos	Front for Victory		8,652,293	45.28
Elisa Carrió	Rubén Giustiniani	Civic Coalition		4,403,642	23.05
Roberto Lavagna	Gerardo Morales	Consensus for an Advanced Nation		3,230,236	16.91
Alberto Rodríguez Saá	Héctor María Maya	Justice, Union and Freedom Front		1,459,174	7.64
Fernando Solanas	Ángel Cadelli	Authentic Socialist Party		301,543	1.58
Ricardo López Murphy	Esteban Bullrich	Recreate for Growth		273,406	1.43
Jorge Sobisch	Jorge Asís	United; Provinces; Movement	United Provinces Movement	152,448	0.80
Jorge Sobisch	Jorge Asís	United; Provinces; Movement	Popular Union	69,126	0.36
Jorge Sobisch	Jorge Asís	United; Provinces; Movement	Neighbourhood Action Movement	36,831	0.19
Jorge Sobisch	Jorge Asís	United; Provinces; Movement	Movement for Dignity and Independence	9,987	0.05
Jorge Sobisch	Jorge Asís	United; Provinces; Movement	Independent Movement of Retirees and Unemployed	3	0.00
Jorge Sobisch	Jorge Asís	United; Provinces; Movement	Total	268,395	1.40
Vilma Ripoll	Héctor Bidonde	Workers' Socialist Movement		142,528	0.75
Néstor Pitrola	Gabriela Arroyo	Workers' Party		116,688	0.61
José Montes	Héctor Heberling	Left and Workers Front for Socialism		84,694	0.44
Luis Ammann	Rogelio de Leonardi	Broad Front towards Latin American Unity		69,787	0.37
Raúl Castells	Nina Pelozo	Independent Movement of Retirees and Unemployed		48,878	0.26
Gustavo Breide Obeid	Héctor Vergara	People's Reconstruction Party		45,318	0.24
Juan Ricardo Mussa	Bernardo Nespral	Popular Loyalty Confederation		10,558	0.06
Total				19,107,140	100.00
Valid votes				19,107,140	92.40
Invalid votes				241,176	1.17
Blank votes				1,331,010	6.44
Total votes				20,679,326	100.00
Registered voters/turnout				27,137,719	76.20
Source: DINE, Ministry of the Interior

=== Chamber of Deputies ===
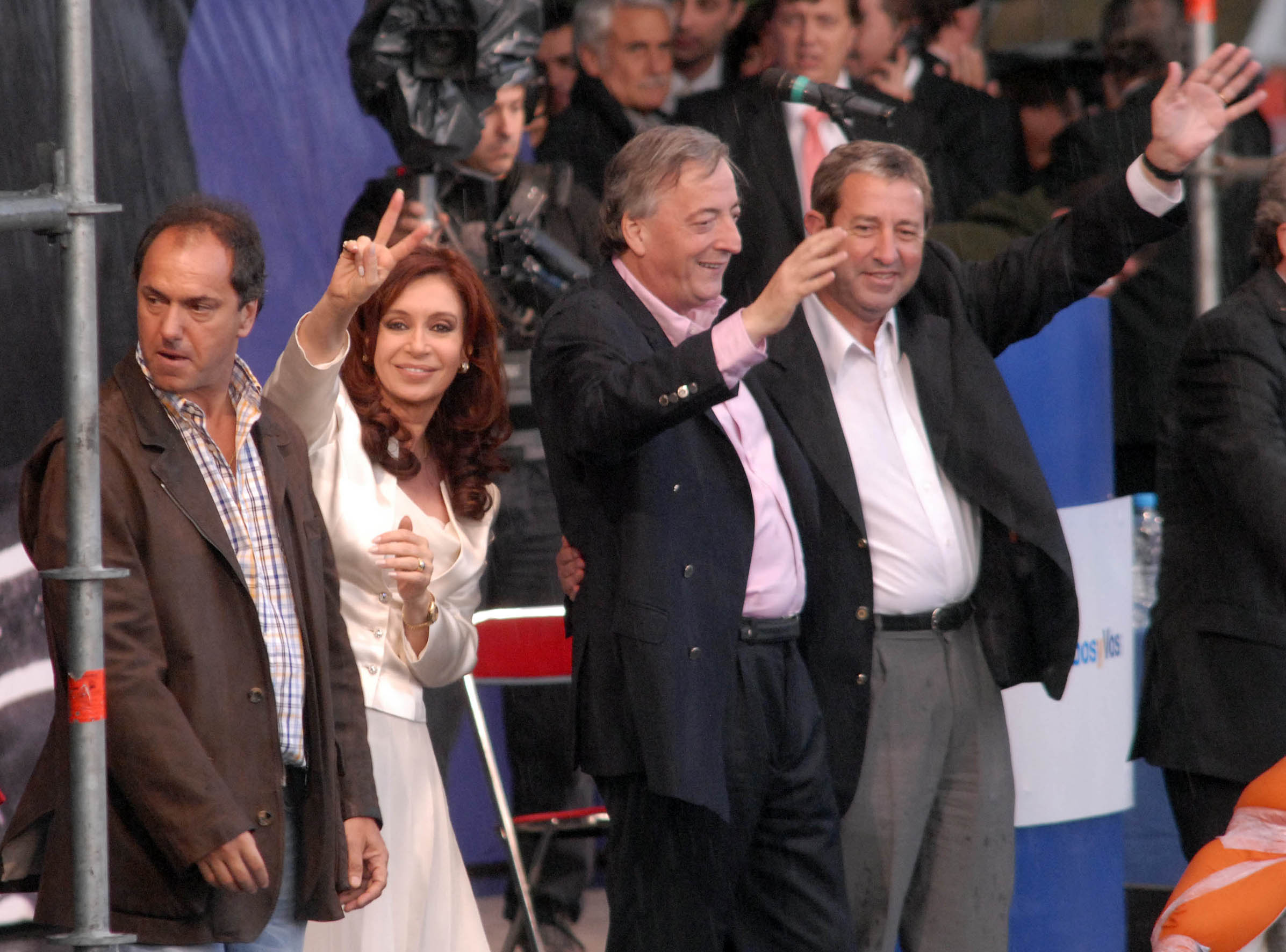
President Néstor Kirchner (2nd from right) backs winning Front for Victory candidates (from L to R) Daniel Scioli (Governor), Cristina Fernández de Kirchner (President) and Julio Cobos (Vice President).

Party or alliance		Votes	%	Seats	
Party or alliance		Votes	%	Won	Total
Front for Victory	Front for Victory	5,942,286	32.85	53	–
Front for Victory	Justicialist Party Alliance	264,495	1.46	3	–
Front for Victory	Party for Citizen Consensus	236,211	1.31	2	–
Front for Victory	Chaco Deserves More	232,851	1.29	2	–
Front for Victory	Front for Victory–Salta Renewal Party	190,067	1.05	2	–
Front for Victory	Civic Front for Santiago	172,727	0.95	4	–
Front for Victory	Front for the Renewal of Concord	165,151	0.91	2	–
Front for Victory	Dialogue for Buenos Aires	159,134	0.88	1	–
Front for Victory	Justicialist Party	147,737	0.82	2	–
Front for Victory	FdT–PACo	139,111	0.77	2	–
Front for Victory	Broad Front–New Córdoba Front	138,596	0.77	1	–
Front for Victory	Justicialist Party–Front for Victory	118,158	0.65	3	–
Front for Victory	Federalist Unity Party	103,043	0.57	1	–
Front for Victory	La Rioja People's Front	81,856	0.45	3	–
Front for Victory	Consensus for Development	74,480	0.41	1	–
Front for Victory	Jujuy First Front	54,220	0.30	1	–
Front for Victory	Front for Change	48,286	0.27	0	–
Front for Victory	Civic and Social Front of Catamarca	44,732	0.25	1	–
Front for Victory	Viable Santiago Movement	33,372	0.18	0	–
Front for Victory	A New Option	32,383	0.18	0	–
Front for Victory	Christian Democratic Party	32,042	0.18	0	–
Front for Victory	Plural Consensus	28,810	0.16	0	–
Front for Victory	Justicialist Front (Catamarca)	24,023	0.13	0	–
Front for Victory	Party for Social Justice	19,179	0.11	0	–
Front for Victory	Union for Jujuy–Plural Consensus	13,502	0.07	0	–
Front for Victory	Renewal Current Party	12,794	0.07	0	–
Front for Victory	Life and Commitment Movement	8,220	0.05	0	–
Front for Victory	Commitment K	5,126	0.03	0	–
Front for Victory	Justice, Democracy and Homeland	2,105	0.01	0	–
Front for Victory	Intransigent Party	2	0.00	0	–
Front for Victory	Total	8,524,699	47.12	84	154
Civic Coalition	Civic Coalition	1,798,752	9.94	12	–
Civic Coalition	Socialist Party	1,009,491	5.58	8	–
Civic Coalition	Support for an Egalitarian Republic	501,921	2.77	3	–
Civic Coalition	ARI–PS	69,057	0.38	0	–
Civic Coalition	Jujuy Change	12,521	0.07	0	–
Civic Coalition	Christian Democratic Party (Santiago del Estero)	9,109	0.05	0	–
Civic Coalition	Open Politics for Social Integrity	5,989	0.03	0	–
Civic Coalition	Total	3,406,840	18.83	23	36
Consensus for an Advanced; Nation	Radical Civic Union	1,183,568	6.54	6	–
Consensus for an Advanced; Nation	Fair Society	253,870	1.40	0	–
Consensus for an Advanced; Nation	Consensus for an Advanced Nation	504,158	2.79	2	–
Consensus for an Advanced; Nation	Democratic Progressive Party	181,026	1.00	0	–
Consensus for an Advanced; Nation	Frente de Todos	163,055	0.90	1	–
Consensus for an Advanced; Nation	Integration and Development Movement	92,889	0.51	0	–
Consensus for an Advanced; Nation	Democratic Party	71,792	0.40	0	–
Consensus for an Advanced; Nation	Radical Civic Union–Corrientes Front	65,157	0.36	1	–
Consensus for an Advanced; Nation	Jujuy Front	62,411	0.34	1	–
Consensus for an Advanced; Nation	La Pampa Civic and Social Front	54,300	0.30	1	–
Consensus for an Advanced; Nation	Let's Change to Grow Front	24,722	0.14	0	–
Consensus for an Advanced; Nation	Civic and Social Front of La Rioja	24,263	0.13	0	–
Consensus for an Advanced; Nation	Together for San Luis Front	19,684	0.11	0	–
Consensus for an Advanced; Nation	Citizen Dignity	17,202	0.10	0	–
Consensus for an Advanced; Nation	Salta Proposal	13,608	0.08	0	–
Consensus for an Advanced; Nation	Constitutional Nationalist Party	10,138	0.06	0	–
Consensus for an Advanced; Nation	Total	2,741,843	15.16	12	31
Republican; Proposal	PRO Union	628,025	3.47	4	–
Republican; Proposal	Republican Proposal	275,601	1.52	2	–
Republican; Proposal	Recreate for Growth	146,717	0.81	0	–
Republican; Proposal	New Proposal (PANU–Recrear)	23,196	0.13	0	–
Republican; Proposal	PRO–Recrear	18,397	0.10	0	–
Republican; Proposal	Republican Alternative Proposal	7,136	0.04	0	–
Republican; Proposal	Commitment to Change	2,963	0.02	0	–
Republican; Proposal	Total	1,102,035	6.09	6	15
Justice, Union and Freedom; Front	Justice, Union and Freedom Front	313,590	1.73	0	–
Justice, Union and Freedom; Front	Union of the Democratic Centre	225,032	1.24	0	–
Justice, Union and Freedom; Front	Justicialist Front (San Luis)	137,343	0.76	2	–
Justice, Union and Freedom; Front	Action for the Republic	126,650	0.70	1	–
Justice, Union and Freedom; Front	Live Entre Ríos	58,952	0.33	0	–
Justice, Union and Freedom; Front	Unity and Liberty Party	31,026	0.17	0	–
Justice, Union and Freedom; Front	Autonomist Party	30,075	0.17	0	–
Justice, Union and Freedom; Front	Popular Loyalty	15,910	0.09	0	–
Justice, Union and Freedom; Front	Renewal Crusade	15,781	0.09	0	–
Justice, Union and Freedom; Front	Retiree's Front–Conservative People's Party	8,721	0.05	0	–
Justice, Union and Freedom; Front	Popular Action Movement	3,462	0.02	0	–
Justice, Union and Freedom; Front	Federal Confederation	2,734	0.02	0	–
Justice, Union and Freedom; Front	Salta Popular Movement	1,545	0.01	0	–
Justice, Union and Freedom; Front	Solidarity and Organization for Liberation	990	0.01	0	–
Justice, Union and Freedom; Front	Loyalty and Dignity	580	0.00	0	–
Justice, Union and Freedom; Front	Total	972,391	5.37	3	14
Proyecto Sur	Authentic Socialist Party	189,154	1.05	0	0
Proyecto Sur	Proyecto Sur	133,411	0.74	1	1
Proyecto Sur	Popular Unity Movement	30,001	0.17	0	0
Proyecto Sur	Total	352,566	1.95	1	1
United; Provinces; Movement	Let's Go	57,949	0.32	0	0
United; Provinces; Movement	Popular Union	62,406	0.34	0	0
United; Provinces; Movement	PAIS–MPU	26,076	0.14	0	0
United; Provinces; Movement	United Provinces Movement	22,569	0.12	0	0
United; Provinces; Movement	Popular Union–MODIN–FIC	8,030	0.04	0	0
United; Provinces; Movement	Movement for Dignity and Independence	7,395	0.04	0	0
United; Provinces; Movement	Federal Party	6,337	0.04	0	0
United; Provinces; Movement	New Generation	2,846	0.02	0	0
United; Provinces; Movement	Neighbourhood Action Movement	1,022	0.01	0	0
United; Provinces; Movement	Independent Front of the North	781	0.00	0	0
United; Provinces; Movement	New People	598	0.00	0	0
United; Provinces; Movement	Total	196,009	1.08	0	0
Workers' Socialist Movement–New Left		159,336	0.88	0	0
Workers' Party		126,729	0.70	0	0
Left and Workers; Front for Socialism	Left and Workers Front for Socialism	69,448	0.38	0	0
Left and Workers; Front for Socialism	Socialist Workers' Party	13,883	0.08	0	0
Left and Workers; Front for Socialism	Socialist Left	2,915	0.02	0	0
Left and Workers; Front for Socialism	Total	86,246	0.48	0	0
Broad Front towards Latin American; Unity	Broad Front towards Latin American Unity	57,385	0.32	0	0
Broad Front towards Latin American; Unity	Humanist Party	9,527	0.05	0	0
Broad Front towards Latin American; Unity	Communist Party	5,001	0.03	0	0
Broad Front towards Latin American; Unity	La Rioja Popular Encounter	3,278	0.02	0	0
Broad Front towards Latin American; Unity	Total	75,191	0.42	0	0
Neuquén People's Movement		50,676	0.28	1	3
Porteño Consensus (MST–New Left)		50,432	0.28	0	0
Independent Movement of Retirees and Unemployed		34,405	0.19	0	0
People's Reconstruction Party		27,800	0.15	0	0
Socialist Convergence		20,201	0.11	0	0
Federal Retirees Movement		15,667	0.09	0	0
Front for Peace and Justice		12,889	0.07	0	0
Call for Citizen Integration		12,265	0.07	0	0
Emancipatory Front		10,717	0.06	0	0
Popular Movement for the Reconquest		9,271	0.05	0	0
Renewal Party of the Province of Buenos Aires		7,206	0.04	0	0
Entre Ríos Broad Encounter		7,141	0.04	0	0
Popular Concentration		6,881	0.04	0	0
Buenos Aires Independent Solidary Action		6,618	0.04	0	0
Front of Self-Convened Political Groups		6,363	0.04	0	0
Movement of Work		6,242	0.03	0	0
Patriotic Movement		6,073	0.03	0	0
Corrientes First Front		5,814	0.03	0	0
Objective Will to Serve		4,833	0.03	0	0
Revolutionary Socialist League		4,724	0.03	0	0
Chubut Action Party		4,601	0.03	0	0
Popular Sovereignty Front		4,277	0.02	0	0
Popular Participation Party		3,119	0.02	0	0
Popular Consensus		3,031	0.02	0	0
Citizen Action		2,778	0.02	0	0
Popular Assemblies		2,700	0.01	0	0
Independent Party of Chubut		2,255	0.01	0	0
Broad Popular Encounter		2,227	0.01	0	0
Fuegian People's Movement		2,216	0.01	0	0
Autonomist Party of Catamarca		2,204	0.01	0	0
Provincial Action		2,142	0.01	0	0
Future Republic Movement		1,896	0.01	0	0
Authentic Fuegian Party		1,830	0.01	0	0
United People		1,434	0.01	0	0
Provincial Defence–White Flag		1,405	0.01	0	0
Fuegian Action Front		1,241	0.01	0	0
Pampa Federalist Movement		895	0.00	0	0
Union for La Rioja		562	0.00	0	0
The Movement		184	0.00	0	0
People's Party of Neuquén		2	0.00	0	0
New Front				–	3
Total		18,091,102	100.00	130	257
Valid votes		18,091,102	87.48		
Invalid votes		228,594	1.11		
Blank votes		2,360,967	11.42		
Total votes		20,680,663	100.00		
Registered voters/turnout		27,137,536	76.21		
Source: DINE, Ministry of the Interior

==== Results by province ====
Province	FPV			CC			UNA			PRO			FREJULI			Others		
Province	Votes	%	Seats	Votes	%	Seats	Votes	%	Seats	Votes	%	Seats	Votes	%	Seats	Votes	%	Seats
Buenos Aires	3,015,087	44.48	20	1,986,438	26.48	9	671,435	9.92	2	734,706	10.85	4	252,318	3.73	—	511,302	7.55	—
Buenos Aires City	396,765	21.69	3	535,580	29.28	5	253,296	13.85	1	245,578	13.42	2	116,843	6.39	—	281,318	15.38	1
Catamarca	98,357	68.73	2	14,598	10.20	—	14,975	10.46	—	—	—	—	9,747	6.81	—	5,431	3.80	—
Chaco	232,851	49.33	2	81,165	17.20	—	131,275	27.81	1	—	—	—	15,910	3.37	—	10,784	2.28	—
Chubut	144,901	65.34	3	38,054	17.16	—	28,283	12.75	—	—	—	—	—	—	—	10,527	4.75	—
Córdoba	396,072	25.27	3	281,175	17.94	2	542,780	34.63	3	18,397	1.17	—	219,045	13.98	1	109,818	7.01	—
Corrientes	227,676	55.48	3	51,448	12.54	—	69,606	16.96	1	30,332	7.39	—	12,935	3.15	—	18,370	4.48	—
Entre Ríos	296,771	47.68	2	114,763	18.44	1	115,223	18.51	1	11,786	1.89	—	59,571	9.57	—	24,294	3.90	—
Formosa	156,881	75.70	3	10,831	5.23	—	33,979	16.40	—	—	—	—	3,724	1.80	—	1,836	0.89	—
Jujuy	167,824	63.17	2	12,521	4.71	—	62,411	23.49	1	—	—	—	3,462	1.30	—	19,443	7.32	—
La Pampa	87,878	55.17	1	9,078	5.70	—	54,300	34.09	1	1,937	1.22	—	—	—	—	6,085	3.82	—
La Rioja	81,856	72.88	3	—	—	—	24,263	21.60	—	—	—	—	—	—	—	6,203	5.52	—
Mendoza	500,706	65.59	5	73,895	9.68	—	141,933	18.59	—	4,225	0.55	—	21,195	2.78	—	21,402	2.80	—
Misiones	297,356	69.75	4	15,194	3.56	—	55,655	13.05	—	—	—	—	2,432	0.57	—	55,679	13.06	—
Neuquén	72,181	36.69	1	44,071	22.40	—	16,565	8.42	—	4,037	2.05	—	—	—	—	59,881	30.44	1
Río Negro	155,493	64.31	3	44,877	18.56	—	27,751	11.48	—	—	—	—	—	—	—	13,671	5.65	—
Salta	415,880	87.75	4	7,577	1.60	—	26,574	5.61	—	1,664	0.35	—	1,545	0.33	—	20,671	4.36	—
San Juan	194,693	64.86	3	18,084	6.02	—	55,474	18.48	—	2,892	0.96	—	23,978	7.99	—	5,071	1.69	—
San Luis	17,128	8.56	—	24,296	12.14	—	19,684	9.84	—	—	—	—	137,343	68.65	2	1,623	0.81	—
Santa Cruz	58,973	67.84	2	—	—	—	24,722	28.44	—	—	—	—	—	—	—	3,235	3.72	—
Santa Fe	586,623	36.28	5	547,783	33.88	5	262,154	16.21	—	22,884	1.42	—	87,300	5.40	—	110,324	6.82	—
Santiago del Estero	290,134	88.00	4	17,088	5.18	—	6,208	1.88	—	4,247	1.29	—	3,409	1.03	—	8,609	2.61	—
Tierra del Fuego	23,235	46.83	2	12,321	24.83	1	3,256	6.56	—	2,963	5.97	—	1,634	3.29	—	6,208	12.51	—
Tucumán	409,378	65.68	4	66,003	10.59	—	100,041	16.05	1	16,387	2.63	—	—	—	—	31,509	5.06	—
Total	8,524,699	47.12	84	3,406,840	18.83	23	2,741,843	15.16	12	1,102,035	6.09	6	972,391	5.37	3	1,343,294	7.43	2

=== Senate ===
Party or alliance		Votes	%	Seats	
Party or alliance		Votes	%	Won	Total
Front for Victory	Front for Victory	1,125,906	26.48	9	–
Front for Victory	Chaco Deserves More	229,186	5.39	2	–
Front for Victory	Front for Victory–Salta Renewal Party	190,539	4.48	1	–
Front for Victory	Civic Front for Santiago	179,136	4.21	2	–
Front for Victory	Consensus for Development	81,200	1.91	1	–
Front for Victory	Viable Santiago Movement	35,459	0.83	1	–
Front for Victory	A New Option	33,041	0.78	0	–
Front for Victory	Christian Democratic Party	26,962	0.63	0	–
Front for Victory	Renewal Current Party	13,564	0.32	0	–
Front for Victory	Federalist Unity Party	7,550	0.18	1	–
Front for Victory	Commitment K	5,158	0.12	0	–
Front for Victory	Total	1,927,701	45.33	17	47
Civic Coalition	Civic Coalition	537,705	12.64	2	–
Civic Coalition	Socialist Party	139,431	3.28	0	–
Civic Coalition	Support for an Egalitarian Republic	115,695	2.72	2	–
Civic Coalition	ARI–Socialist Party	43,671	1.03	0	–
Civic Coalition	Open Politics for Social Integrity	2,733	0.06	0	–
Civic Coalition	Total	839,235	19.74	4	5
Consensus for an Advanced; Nation	Radical Civic Union	239,748	5.64	1	–
Consensus for an Advanced; Nation	Frente de Todos	147,491	3.47	1	–
Consensus for an Advanced; Nation	Consensus for an Advanced Nation	106,239	2.50	0	–
Consensus for an Advanced; Nation	Democratic Progressive Party	78,547	1.85	0	–
Consensus for an Advanced; Nation	Integration and Development Movement	22,873	0.54	0	–
Consensus for an Advanced; Nation	Salta Proposal	13,353	0.31	0	–
Consensus for an Advanced; Nation	Total	608,251	14.30	2	11
Republican; Proposal	Republican Proposal	253,706	5.97	0	–
Republican; Proposal	Recreate for Growth	17,047	0.40	0	–
Republican; Proposal	Commitment to Change	4,802	0.11	0	–
Republican; Proposal	Total	275,555	6.48	0	1
Justice, Union and Freedom; Front	Live Entre Ríos	59,557	1.40	0	–
Justice, Union and Freedom; Front	Justice, Union and Freedom Front	50,968	1.20	0	–
Justice, Union and Freedom; Front	Union of the Democratic Centre	41,274	0.97	0	–
Justice, Union and Freedom; Front	Autonomist Party	26,308	0.62	0	–
Justice, Union and Freedom; Front	Popular Loyalty	15,310	0.36	0	–
Justice, Union and Freedom; Front	Salta Popular Movement	1,518	0.04	0	–
Justice, Union and Freedom; Front	Unity and Liberty Party	1,455	0.03	0	–
Justice, Union and Freedom; Front	Action for the Republic	599	0.01	0	–
Justice, Union and Freedom; Front	Total	196,989	4.63	0	4
Proyecto Sur		126,859	2.98	0	0
Neuquén People's Movement		51,451	1.21	1	1
Porteño Consensus (MST–New Left)		45,464	1.07	0	0
Workers' Socialist Movement-New Left		43,776	1.03	0	0
Workers' Party		34,480	0.81	0	0
United; Provinces; Movement	United Provinces Movement	15,860	0.37	0	0
United; Provinces; Movement	Popular Union–MODIN–FIC	7,392	0.17	0	0
United; Provinces; Movement	New Generation	2,057	0.05	0	0
United; Provinces; Movement	Total	25,309	0.60	0	0
Broad Front towards Latin; American Unity	Broad Front towards Latin American Unity	14,184	0.33	0	0
Broad Front towards Latin; American Unity	Humanist Party	1,710	0.04	0	0
Broad Front towards Latin; American Unity	Communist Party of Argentina	770	0.02	0	0
Broad Front towards Latin; American Unity	Total	16,664	0.39	0	0
People's Reconstruction Party		10,651	0.25	0	0
Left and Workers Front for Socialism	PTS–MAS–IS	7,472	0.18	0	0
Left and Workers Front for Socialism	Socialist Workers' Party	1,894	0.04	0	0
Left and Workers Front for Socialism	Total	9,366	0.22	0	0
Entre Ríos Broad Encounter		7,615	0.18	0	0
Independent Movement of Retirees and Unemployed		6,503	0.15	0	0
Revolutionary Socialist League		4,538	0.11	0	0
Popular Sovereignty Front		3,589	0.08	0	0
Socialist Convergence		3,413	0.08	0	0
Citizen Action		2,668	0.06	0	0
Popular Assemblies		2,537	0.06	0	0
Future Republic Movement		2,267	0.05	0	0
Fuegian Action Front		1,935	0.05	0	0
Broad Popular Encounter		1,782	0.04	0	0
Fuegian People's Movement		1,585	0.04	0	0
Authentic Fuegian Party		1,344	0.03	0	0
Call for Citizen Integration		653	0.02	0	0
The Movement		155	0.00	0	0
Popular Party		3	0.00	0	0
Republican Force				–	2
New Front				–	1
Total		4,252,338	100.00	24	72
Valid votes		4,252,338	91.00		
Invalid votes		56,066	1.20		
Blank votes		364,388	7.80		
Total votes		4,672,792	100.00		
Registered voters/turnout		6,320,953	73.93		
Source: DINE, Ministry of the Interior

==== Results by province ====
Province	FPV			CC			UNA			PRO			FREJULI			Others		
Province	Votes	%	Seats	Votes	%	Seats	Votes	%	Seats	Votes	%	Seats	Votes	%	Seats	Votes	%	Seats
Buenos Aires City	412,012	22.41	1	530,304	28.84	2	268,997	14.63	—	248,881	13.54	—	115,152	6.26	—	263,416	14.33	—
Chaco	229,186	47.75	2	78,075	16.27	—	147,491	30.73	1	—	—	—	15,310	3.19	—	9,868	2.06	—
Entre Ríos	297,770	47.65	2	116,495	18.64	—	114,499	18.32	1	11,503	1.84	—	60,156	9.63	—	24,452	3.91	—
Neuquén	72,911	36.95	2	43,671	22.13	—	16,742	8.49	—	3,891	1.97	—	—	—	—	60,095	30.46	1
Río Negro	165,092	67.02	3	43,901	17.82	—	23,949	9.72	—	—	—	—	—	—	—	13,402	5.44	—
Salta	420,442	87.98	3	7,401	1.55	—	26,524	5.55	—	1,653	0.35	—	1,518	0.32	—	20,334	4.26	—
Santiago del Estero	306,717	91.19	3	7,815	2.32	—	6,131	1.82	—	4,825	1.43	—	3,398	1.01	—	7,464	2.22	—
Tierra del Fuego	23,571	46.31	1	11,573	22.74	2	3,918	7.70	—	4,802	9.44	—	1,455	2.86	—	5,576	10.96	—
Total	1,927,701	45.33	17	839,235	19.74	4	608,251	14.30	2	275,555	6.48	0	196,989	4.63	0	404,607	9.51	1

=== Governors ===
The elections for governors took place in ten provinces in September, which were won in six provinces by Kirchner's Front for Victory. Hermes Binner was elected governor of Santa Fe, defeating Peronist Rafael Bielsa, the former Minister of Foreign Affairs for Pres. Néstor Kirchner. Binner thus became the first Socialist governor in Argentina's history and the first non-Justicialist elected governor of that province. Center-left Fabiana Ríos (ARI) became the first woman elected governor in Argentina, winning an upset in Tierra del Fuego Province, while the moderately conservative Mauricio Macri was elected Mayor of Buenos Aires (an office similar to governor) in June 2007.

Corrientes Province and Santiago del Estero Province did not have elections for governors in 2007, as they had already taken place in 2005.

District	Elected Governor	Party	%	Runner-up	Party	%
Buenos Aires	Daniel Scioli	Front for Victory (FPV)	48.2	Margarita Stolbizer	Civic Coalition	16.6
Catamarca	Eduardo Brizuela del Moral	Civic Social Front – FPV	52.6	Luis Barrionuevo	Justicialist Party (JP)	37.6
Chaco	Jorge Capitanich	Justicialist	46.8	Ángel Rozas ^{L}	Front for All (UCR)	46.6
Chubut	Mario Das Neves	Justicialist	76.7	Raúl Barneche	UCR	13.5
City of Buenos Aires	Mauricio Macri	PRO	60.9	Daniel Filmus ^{L}	Front for Victory (FPV)	39.1
Córdoba^{1}	Juan Schiaretti	Justicialist	37.2	Luis Juez	Social and Civic Agreement	36.0
Entre Ríos	Sergio Urribarri	FPV	47.0	Gustavo Cusinato	UCR	19.9
Formosa	Gildo Insfrán ^{R}	Justicialist	76.0	Gabriel Hernández	UCR	19.2
Jujuy	Walter Barrionuevo	FPV	36.0	Carlos Snopek	Jujuy First Alliance	30.0
La Pampa	Oscar Jorge	Justicialist	53.5	Juan Carlos Marino	Social and Civic Agreement	36.6
La Rioja	Luis Beder Herrera ^{R}	La Rioja People's Front	42.6	Ricardo Quintela	FPV	27.8
Mendoza	Celso Jaque	Justicialist	37.9	César Biffi	Citizen's Alliance	30.0
Misiones	Maurice Closs	Front for the Renewal of Concord	38.4	Pablo Tschirsch	FPV	28.6
Neuquén	Jorge Sapag	Neuquén People's Movement	48.3	Horacio Quiroga	FPV – UCR Alliance	35.0
Río Negro	Miguel Saiz	UCR	47.3	Miguel Ángel Pichetto	FPV	40.8
Salta	Juan Manuel Urtubey	Salta Renewal Party – FPV Alliance	46.3	Walter Wayar	Justicialist	45.3
San Juan	José Luis Gioja	FPV	61.2	Roberto Basualdo	Front for Change	24.5
San Luis	Alberto Rodríguez Saá ^{R}	Justicialist	86.3	Roque Palma	Popular Socialist	9.8
Santa Cruz	Daniel Peralta	FPV	58.1	Eduardo Costa	UCR	38.8
Santa Fe	Hermes Binner	Progressive, Civic and Social Front	52.7	Rafael Bielsa	FPV	41.9
Santiago del Estero^{2}	Gerardo Zamora ^{R}	Civic Front for Santiago	85.1	Marcelo Lugones	Popular Unity Force (UCR)	5.0
Tierra del Fuego	Fabiana Ríos	ARI	52.4	Hugo Cóccaro	FPV	47.6
Tucumán	José Alperovich ^{R}	FPV	78.2	Ricardo Bussi	Republican Force	5.3
Sources: Clarín, September 3, 2007. National Electoral Direction, Ministry of Interior. 1: Civic and Social Front candidate Luis Juez, who lost by 1.1%, accused Justicialist candidate Juan Schiaretti of electoral fraud; the Argentine Supreme Court certified the results in October. 2: Election held November 30, 2008. R: Reelected. L: Incumbent lost.
