= Jorge Sobisch =

Argentine politician

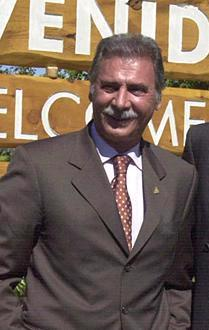

Governor of Neuquén Province
- In office 1999–2007
- Vice Governor: Jorge Sapag (1999-2003); Federico Brollo (2003-2007)
- Preceded by: Felipe Sapag
- Succeeded by: Jorge Sapag
- In office 1991–1995
- Vice Governor: Felipe Rodolfo Sapag
- Preceded by: Pedro Salvatori
- Succeeded by: Felipe Sapag

Personal details
- Born: January 16, 1943 (age 83) Buenos Aires, Argentina
- Party: Neuquén People's Movement
- Profession: graphic designer

Jorge Omar Sobisch (born January 16, 1943) is an Argentine peronist centre-right politician, formerly governor of Neuquén Province. He led the Neuquén People's Movement and was candidate for President of Argentina in 2007.

== Biography ==
Sobisch was born in Buenos Aires and moved to Neuquén as a young boy with the military family of his father, Carlos Sobisch. He studied in Neuquén and Buenos Aires, then moved to Trelew, Chubut as a young man to work in a friend's design company. He became a graphics operator and typesetter, later establishing his own company. He completed his military service in Sarmiento, Chubut.

Sobisch assisted his Peronist father in founding the Neuquén People's Movement in 1961, following him into politics. The party won the Neuquén city elections in 1983 after the return of democracy and Sobisch became mayor, taking took a leading role in renewing the party. He also led the Club Atlético Independiente football club from 1971.

Sobisch was elected governor of the province in 1991, serving until 1995. He took over the leadership of the party in 1997. He won again as governor in 1999 and 2003, with 57% of the vote, his term expiring in 2007 when he stepped down.

Sobisch led the founding of the Movement of the United Provinces, a new, conservative party, and was the movement's candidate for the Presidency in 2007. He had previously formed a centre-right alliance with Mauricio Macri, although it did not survive Macri's alliance with Ricardo López Murphy (who is not on good terms with Sobisch); López Murphy was a conservative presidential candidate in both 2003 and 2007.

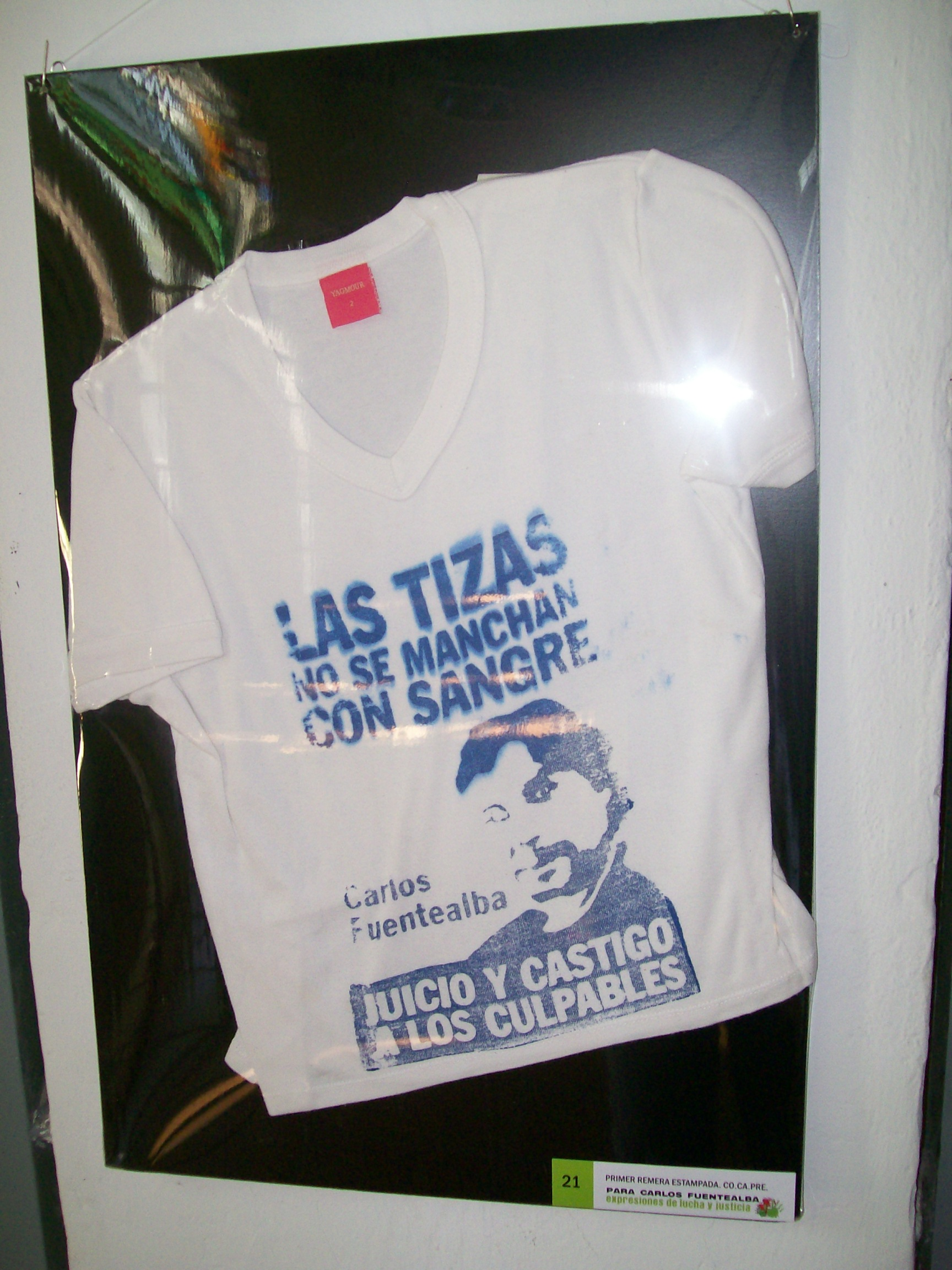
A T-shirt commemorates the assassinated school teacher, Carlos Fuentealba.

Sobisch is also seen as an ally of former Justicialist Party President Carlos Menem and had hoped to become the candidate of those Peronists opposed to President Néstor Kirchner. Following a scandal in his home province, concerning the April 7 death of local teachers' union member Carlos Fuentealba (who was reportedly fired upon by provincial police during a protest despite being unarmed), Sobisch was largely shunned by disgruntled Peronists who mainly backed Alberto Rodríguez Saá. Sobisch was, however, backed by crime victims' rights activist Juan Carlos Blumberg.

In 2007, Sobisch and his running mate, Jorge Asís, gained 284,161 votes in the presidential elections, amounting to 1.56% of the national vote, in sixth place. His wife of 38 years, Liliana Planas, died on December 22, 2009, after falling from their ninth story Neuquén apartment building, in what local coroners determined to be a suicide.

Preceded by Pedro Salvatori	Governor of Neuquén; 1991 – 1995	Succeeded by Felipe Sapag
Preceded by Felipe Sapag	Governor of Neuquén; 1999 – 2007	Succeeded by Jorge Sapag
