= Omar Gutiérrez =

Argentine politician

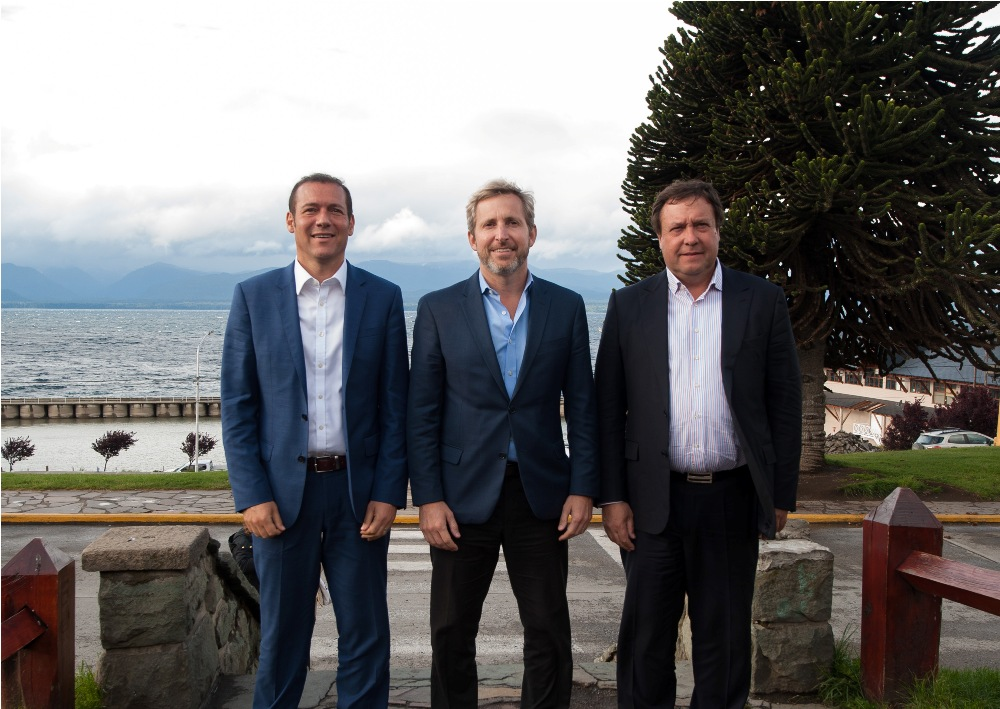

Governor of Neuquén
- In office 10 December 2015 – 10 December 2023
- Vice Governor: Rolando Figueroa; Marcos Koopmann
- Preceded by: Jorge Sapag
- Succeeded by: Rolando Figueroa

Minister of Economy and Public Works of Neuquén
- In office 10 December 2011 – 10 December 2015
- Governor: Jorge Sapag

Personal details
- Born: 24 September 1967 (age 59) Neuquén, Neuquén Province, Argentina
- Party: Neuquén People's Movement
- Education: National University of Comahue

Omar Gutiérrez (born 24 September 1967) is an Argentine politician, who served as governor of the Neuquén Province from 2015 to 2023. He is the former minister of economy of the previous governor, Jorge Sapag. With his victory in the 2015 elections, the Neuquén People's Movement continued ruling the province after 53 years.

On 10 August 2020, Gutiérrez attended the inauguration ceremony of Costa Limay Sustainable Complex for Transgender Women, an affordable housing project for transgender women founded by the Catholic nun Sister Mónica Astorga Cremona.
