= Elías Sapag =

Argentine politician

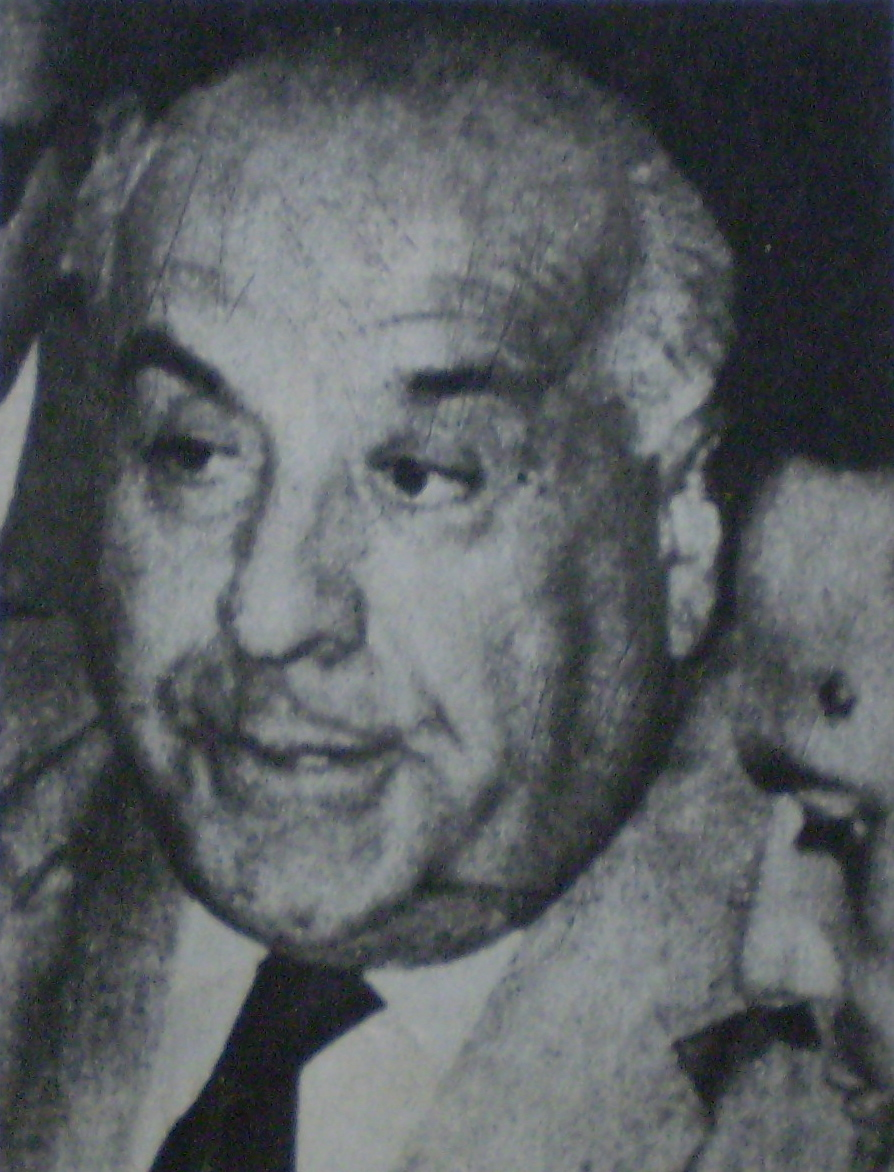
Elías Sapag in 1970

Elías Canaán Sapag (Arabic: إلياس كنعان صباغ) (August 5, 1911 – June 21, 1993) was a Lebanese-born Argentine politician, long-serving senator for Neuquén Province, founder of the Neuquén People's Movement and head of the locally influential Sapag family.

Sapag was born in Mayrouba, in the Keserwan District, Lebanon, and emigrated with his parents to Argentina in 1913. They arrived in Covunco, Neuquén, where his grandfather had already set up home, and moved on to Zapala. His parents had several more children, including his brothers Felipe, Amado and José. The family were successful in business, but the 1930 economic collapse brought great hardship. Sapag and his brothers were forced to give up their education to work to support the family and they moved to Cutral Có to set up a company. He and his brothers played leading roles in the community, and became leading Peronist activists. Elías chaired the Settlement Committee (Comisión de Fomento) of the town whilst Felipe was secretary, helping newcomers to settle in the new town. Felipe later became the first mayor of Cutral-Có, and Amado became mayor of Zapala.

Following the military coup d'etat and the banning of the Peronist movement, Sapag and his brothers founded the Neuquino People's Movement, a provincial political party able to contest elections. Originally called 'Provincial Politics', it came into being on June 4, 1961, and Elías became party president. He was elected to the Argentine Senate in 1963, whilst Felipe was elected Governor of Neuquén and would serve on four further occasions until the 1990s.

Having been deposed by the military in 1966, Elías Sapag was re-elected to the Senate in 1973, and returned to Congress in 1983 upon the restoration of democracy, serving until his death in 1993. He was one of Argentina's longest-serving senators.

Sapag married Alma Cavallo, who was a niece of Salvadora Medina Onrubia, and they had seven children. His son Rodolfo 'Pipe' Sapag succeeded him as senator, his daughter, Luz Sapag, was next to become a senator herself, whilst another son Jorge served as vice-governor and from 2007 as governor of Neuquén.
