= Cutral Có =

- City
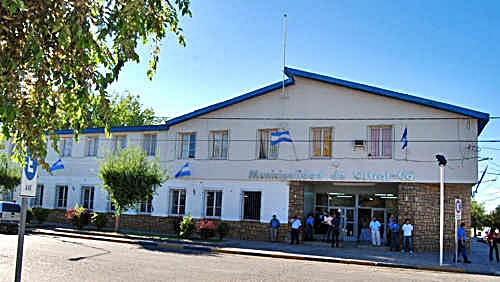

- Location within Neuquén Province Location within Argentina
- Coordinates: 38°56′S 69°14′W
- Country: Argentina
- Province: Neuquén
- Department: Confluencia
- Founded: October 22, 1933

Government
  - Mayor: Tomás Eduardo Benítez (UCR)

Area
  - Total: 81 km^{2} (31 sq mi)
- Elevation: 541 m (1,775 ft)

Population (2010 census)
  - Total: 35,465
  - Density: 440/km^{2} (1,100/sq mi)
- Demonym: cutralcoense
- Time zone: UTC−3 (ART)
- CPA base: Q8322
- Dialing code: +54 0299
- Climate: BWk
- Website: Official website

Cutral Có is a city in the Confluencia Department of Neuquén Province in Argentina. It is part of the statistical area formed with neighboring Plaza Huincul.

The settlement is located in the desert, it was founded in 1933 after the discovery of oil. The majority of the economy is based on the petrochemical industry. Cutral-Có is home to several multinational corporations such as Repsol-YPF and Petrobras.

Following the 1992 privatization of YPF, thousands of people lost their jobs in the city's important industrial action.

There are plans to transport water from the Río Neuquén in order to introduce agriculture to the region.

The city used to have its own airport.

In June 2026, the world's tallest statue of Lionel Messi was unveiled in the city. The monument stands 26 meters tall.

== Notable people ==
- Omar Carrasco (1974–1994), a conscript whose murder in 1994 led to the abolition of mandatory military service in Argentina

== Climate ==
Climate data for Cutral Có
Month	Jan	Feb	Mar	Apr	May	Jun	Jul	Aug	Sep	Oct	Nov	Dec	Year
Record high °C (°F)	39.4 (102.9)	38.3 (100.9)	35.5 (95.9)	32.2 (90.0)	27.8 (82.0)	26.0 (78.8)	25.1 (77.2)	26.2 (79.2)	28.3 (82.9)	34.1 (93.4)	36.2 (97.2)	39.1 (102.4)	39.4 (102.9)
Mean daily maximum °C (°F)	29.8 (85.6)	29.3 (84.7)	25.9 (78.6)	20.2 (68.4)	15.6 (60.1)	11.7 (53.1)	11.8 (53.2)	14.3 (57.7)	16.4 (61.5)	20.7 (69.3)	25.1 (77.2)	27.6 (81.7)	20.7 (69.3)
Daily mean °C (°F)	21.0 (69.8)	20.4 (68.7)	17.5 (63.5)	12.9 (55.2)	9.1 (48.4)	5.6 (42.1)	5.6 (42.1)	7.5 (45.5)	9.2 (48.6)	13.1 (55.6)	17.4 (63.3)	19.8 (67.6)	13.3 (55.9)
Mean daily minimum °C (°F)	14.0 (57.2)	13.1 (55.6)	10.5 (50.9)	6.9 (44.4)	3.6 (38.5)	0.8 (33.4)	0.4 (32.7)	1.5 (34.7)	3.1 (37.6)	6.2 (43.2)	10.1 (50.2)	12.2 (54.0)	6.9 (44.4)
Record low °C (°F)	5.0 (41.0)	4.1 (39.4)	−4.0 (24.8)	−2.3 (27.9)	−5.6 (21.9)	−10.2 (13.6)	−9.6 (14.7)	−7.0 (19.4)	−7.5 (18.5)	−2.1 (28.2)	1.8 (35.2)	−0.7 (30.7)	−10.2 (13.6)
Average precipitation mm (inches)	9.5 (0.37)	10.5 (0.41)	11.5 (0.45)	19.0 (0.75)	14.5 (0.57)	18.0 (0.71)	13.0 (0.51)	8.0 (0.31)	16.5 (0.65)	27.5 (1.08)	14.5 (0.57)	15.0 (0.59)	177.5 (6.99)
Average relative humidity (%)	31.5	36.5	42.0	49.5	59.5	66.0	64.5	54.5	49.5	43.5	37.5	34.0	47.4
Source: Secretaria de Mineria
