= Jorge Sapag =

Argentine politician and lawyer

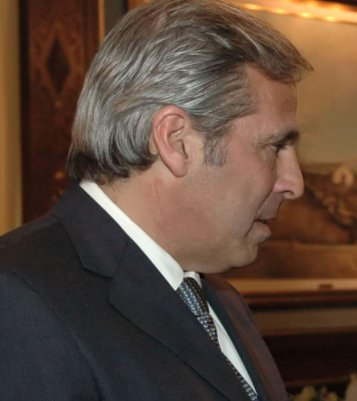

Governor of Neuquén
- In office December 10, 2007 – December 10, 2015
- Vice Governor: Ana Pechen
- Preceded by: Jorge Sobisch
- Succeeded by: Omar Gutiérrez

Personal details
- Born: July 18, 1951 (age 74) Zapala, Neuquén Province
- Party: Neuquén People's Movement
- Profession: Lawyer

Jorge Augusto Sapag (born July 18, 1951) is an Argentine politician and lawyer, a member of the Neuquino People's Movement (MPN) and governor of Neuquén Province in Argentina since 2007.

Born in Zapala, Neuquén Province, Jorge Sapag is a member of a prominent family in the politics of Neuquén Province. He is the son of the late senator Elías Sapag, nephew of Felipe Sapag, five times governor of the province and brother of Luz María Sapag, former senator, provincial deputy and mayor of San Martín de los Andes.

In 1976 Sapag completed his law studies at the Pontifical Catholic University of Argentina. Between 1991 and 1995 he worked at the government ministries of education and justice of Neuquén. In 1999 was elected Vice Governor of the province, and in 2007, he was elected Governor of the province for a term ending in 2011.

Preceded by Jorge Sobisch	Governor of Neuquén; 2007–2015	Succeeded by Omar Gutiérrez
