= Legislature of Neuquén =

Legislative body of Neuquén Province, Argentina

Type
- Type: Unicameral

Leadership
- President (Vice Governor): Marcos Koopmann (MPN) since 10 December 2019
- First Vice President: María Fernanda Villone (MPN) since 10 December 2019
- Second Vice President: Mariano Mansilla (FDT) since 10 December 2019

Structure
- Seats: 35 legislators
- Political groups: Government (15): Neuquén People's Movement (9); Siempre (2); Juntos (1); Popular Union (1); Neuquén Integration Front (1); Opposition (20): Frente de Todos (9); Juntos por el Cambio (4); Christian Democratic Party (3); Avanzar (1); Civic Coalition ARI (1); Workers' Left Front (1); PTS FIT (1)
- Length of term: 4 years
- Authority: Constitution of Neuquén

Elections
- Voting system: Proportional representation
- Last election: 10 March 2019
- Next election: 2023

Website
- legislaturaneuquen.gob.ar

The Legislature of Neuquén Province (Spanish: Legislatura de la Provincia del Neuquén) is the unicameral legislative body of Neuquén Province, in Argentina. It convenes in the provincial capital, Neuquén.

It comprises 35 legislators, elected in a single multi-member district through proportional representation every four years. Elections employ the D'Hondt system and a 3% electoral threshold.

Its powers and responsibilities are established in the provincial constitution. The legislature is presided by the Vice Governor of Neuquén (presently Marcos Koopmann of the Neuquén People's Movement), who is elected alongside the governor.

The legislature was established in 1958, when the National Territory of Neuquén became a province of Argentina. The first legislature convened on 1 May 1958. Since the establishment of the province, the regionalist Neuquén People's Movement (MPN) has dominated provincial politics and has been the largest party in the legislature.
