= Felipe Sapag =

Argentine politician

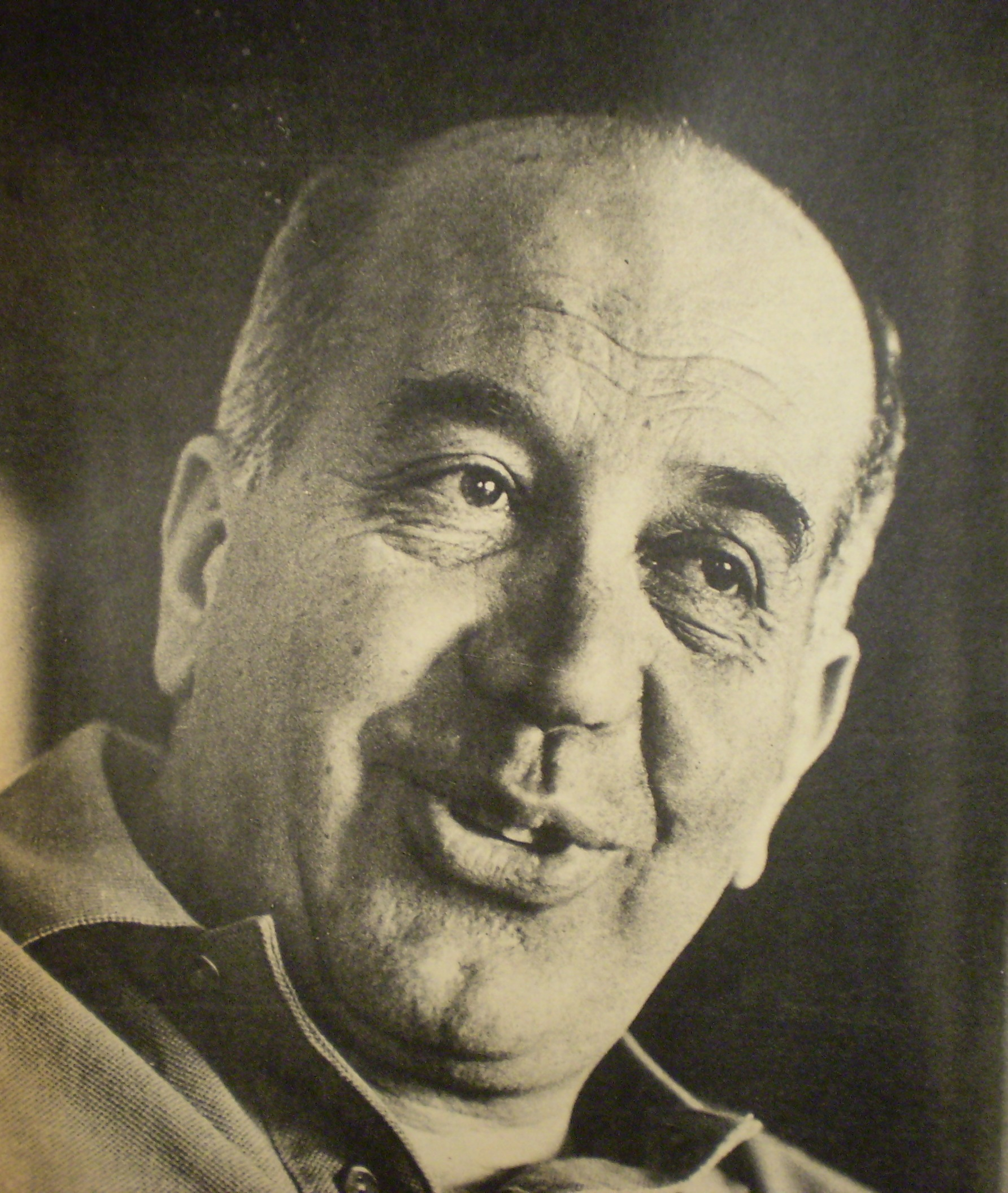

Governor of Neuquén
- In office 1963–1966; 1970–1972; 1973–1976; 1983–1987; 1995–1999

Personal details
- Born: February 14, 1917 Zapala, Neuquén Province, Argentina
- Died: March 14, 2010 (aged 93)
- Party: Neuquén People's Movement
- Spouse: Estela Romeo

Felipe Sapag (February 14, 1917 – March 14, 2010) was an Argentine politician, governor of Neuquén Province on five occasions and a leading figure in the Neuquén People's Movement and the locally influential Sapag family.

== Life and times ==
Sapag was born in Zapala to Lebanese immigrants who had moved to Neuquén in 1913. His elder brother was Elías Sapag, later a senator, and their younger brothers were Amado and José. Felipe Sapag studied in Zapala and Bahía Blanca but could not finish his secondary education due to the hardship his family endured after the 1930 economic collapse. He and his brothers began to work to support the family and moved to Cutral Có to set up a company. He and his brothers played leading roles in the community, and Felipe founded the local energy co-op and the sports and cultural centre. A Peronist activist, he became a councillor and the first mayor of Cutral-Có in 1952.

Following the military coup d'etat and the banning of the Peronist movement, Sapag and his brothers, together with Carlos Sobisch, founded the Neuquino People's Movement, a provincial political party able to contest elections. Originally called 'Provincial Politics', it was established on June 4, 1961.

Sapag first stood for governor in March 1962, but the elections were annulled by the military government. He was elected governor of Neuquén in 1963, gaining 60% of the vote, and left office in June 1966, deposed by the military; among his administration's notable accomplishments were the establishment of the Neuquén Development Corporation (COPADE), the Bank of the Province of Neuquén, and the Universidad Provincial del Neuquén (today the National University of Comahue).

In 1970, in an unexpected decision, he accepted the offer of the military government to become federal receiver of the province, ruling it until 1972. The following year he was re-elected governor but was again removed after the 1976 military coup.

Following the restoration of democracy, Sapag was returned to the governor's post by voters, serving in 1983–87 and 1995–99. Even in old age, he continued to be active in the politics of his province, and despite calls for him to be expelled from the party he helped found for supporting Néstor Kirchner in the 2003 election, as well as for his support of members of the Sapag family in their campaigns.

Sapag was married to Estela Romeo. They had four children: Luis Felipe, Silvia Estela, Ricardo, and Enrique. Ricardo and Enrique disappeared in the Dirty War that followed the 1976 coup, while Luis and Silvia followed their father into politics. The 93-year-old Felipe Sapag died in his home in Neuquén on March 14, 2010; Governor Jorge Sapag, his nephew, declared seven days of official mourning in his honor.
