= Neuquén People's Movement =

Political party in Argentina

Neuquén People's Movement Movimiento Popular Neuquino
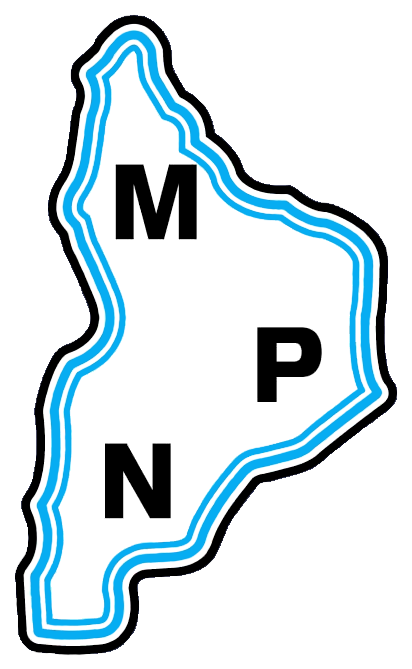
- Abbreviation: MPN
- President: Omar Gutiérrez
- General Secretary: Silvia Noemi De Otaño
- Vice President: Luis Felipe Sapag
- Treasurer: Marcelo Humberto Berenguer
- Founder: Felipe Sapag; Elías Sapag; Amado Sapag
- Founded: 4 June 1961
- Headquarters: Neuquén, Argentina
- Ideology: Peronism; Regionalism; Third Way; Federal Peronism
- Political position: Centre-right
- Parliamentary group: Hacemos Federal Coalition (HCF)
- Seats in the Chamber of Deputies: 1 / 257
- Seats in the Senate: 2 / 72
- Seats in the Legislature of Neuquén: 9 / 35

Website
- www.movimientopopularneuquino.org

The Neuquén People's Movement (Spanish: Movimiento Popular Neuquino, MPN) is a regionalist provincial political party in Neuquén, Argentina.

The party was founded by, amongst others, Carlos Sobisch, Elías Sapag, Felipe Sapag and his brothers, Peronists who had been discriminated against by the military government. It began on 4 June 1961 and has held the Neuquén governorship and many of the local and national legislative positions since then.

At the legislative elections on October 23, 2005, the party won two of the 127 elected national deputies (out of 257). It has one of the three Neuquén senators in the Argentine Senate – Horacio Lores, as well as the governor of Neuquén, Jorge Sapag, son of Elías Sapag. Luz Sapag, Elías' daughter, is Mayor of San Martín de los Andes and a former senator.

Jorge Sobisch, son of Carlos Sobisch, was a candidate for the presidency of Argentina at the 2007 elections, having been a high-profile governor of Neuquén. Sobisch resigned the presidency of the MPN in December 2007. The party has seen internal rivalry between the Sapag and Sobisch families, along a left-right political split.
