= Andrés Gómez (disambiguation) =

Andrés Gómez (born 1960) is a former professional tennis player from Ecuador.

Andrés Gómez may also refer to:

- Andrés Gómez (actor) (born 1993), Venezuelan actor, model and singer
- Andrés Gómez (basketball) (1913–1991), Mexican basketball player
- Andrés Gómez (field hockey) (born 1962), Spanish former field hockey player
- Andrés Gómez (footballer) (born 2002), Colombian professional footballer
- Andrés Vicente Gómez (born 1943), Spanish film producer
