= List of 2022 box office number-one films in Argentina =

This is a list of films which placed number-one at the weekend box office in Argentina during 2022. Amounts are in American dollars.

== Number-one films ==
†	This implies the highest-grossing movie of the year.

#	Weekend end date	Film	Box office	Openings in the top ten	Ref.
1	9 January 2022	Spider-Man: No Way Home	$860,000	The King's Man #2	
2	16 January 2022	Encanto	$21,064		
3	23 January 2022	Encanto	$34,664	The 355 #3	
4	30 January 2022	Licorice Pizza	$50,000	Nightmare Alley #2	
5	6 February 2022	Sing 2	$269,000		
6	13 February 2022	Death on the Nile	$131,682	The Exorcism of God #2; The Beatles: Get Back #4	
7	20 February 2022	Death on the Nile	$66,654	Spencer #2	
8	27 February 2022	Death on the Nile	$52,256		
9	6 March 2022	Death on the Nile	$26,065		
10	13 March 2022	Sing 2	$74,402		
11	20 March 2022	The Bad Guys	$296,000	Ambulance #2	
12	27 March 2022	The Bad Guys	$343,000		
13	3 April 2022	The Bad Guys	$190,127		
14	10 April 2022	The Bad Guys	$89,609		
15	17 April 2022	The Bad Guys	$66,402		
16	24 April 2022	The Northman	$127,000		
17	1 May 2022	Sonic the Hedgehog 2	$400,000		
18	8 May 2022	Doctor Strange in the Multiverse of Madness	$5,316,185		
19	15 May 2022	Doctor Strange in the Multiverse of Madness	$1,694,931		
20	22 May 2022	Doctor Strange in the Multiverse of Madness	$798,102	The Unbearable Weight of Massive Talent #2	
21	29 May 2022	Top Gun: Maverick	$1,200,000	The Bob's Burgers Movie #5	
22	5 June 2022	Jurassic World Dominion	$2,776,000		
23	12 June 2022	Jurassic World Dominion	$2,073,000		
24	19 June 2022	Lightyear	$2,450,925		
25	26 June 2022	Lightyear	$1,262,933	The Black Phone #2; Dog #4	
26	3 July 2022	Minions: The Rise of Gru †	$3,396,000		
27	10 July 2022	Thor: Love and Thunder	$3,595,213		
28	17 July 2022	Minions: The Rise of Gru †	$2,773,668		
29	24 July 2022	Minions: The Rise of Gru †	$2,448,187		
30	31 July 2022	Minions: The Rise of Gru †	$1,578,451	DC League of Super-Pets #2	
31	7 August 2022	Minions: The Rise of Gru †	$435,930		
32	14 August 2022	Minions: The Rise of Gru †	$203,962		
33	21 August 2022	Dragon Ball Super: Super Hero	$1,500,000		
34	28 August 2022	Nope	$143,619		
35	4 September 2022	Nope	$82,920		
36	11 September 2022	Minions: The Rise of Gru †	$43,276	Three Thousand Years of Longing #4	
37	18 September 2022	Ticket to Paradise	$160,491	Barbarian #2	
38	25 September 2022	Avatar	$327,065	See How They Run #3	
39	2 October 2022	Avatar	$152,209		
40	9 October 2022	Avatar	$144,001	Amsterdam #2	
41	16 October 2022	Halloween Ends	$185,147		
42	23 October 2022	Halloween Ends	$85,647		
43	30 October 2022	Halloween Ends	$37,713	Mrs. Harris Goes to Paris #2	
44	6 November 2022	Mrs. Harris Goes to Paris	$4,389		
45	13 November 2022	Black Panther: Wakanda Forever	$1,600,649		
46	20 November 2022	Black Panther: Wakanda Forever	$609,008	The Menu #2	
47	27 November 2022	Black Panther: Wakanda Forever	$222,512	Strange World #2; She Said #5	
48	4 December 2022	Black Panther: Wakanda Forever	$170,314	Violent Night #3	
49	11 December 2022	Black Panther: Wakanda Forever	$166,827		
50	18 December 2022	Avatar: The Way of Water	$2,357,235		
51	25 December 2022	Avatar: The Way of Water	$818,340		
52	1 January 2023	Avatar: The Way of Water	$821,153		

== Highest-grossing films ==
Highest-grossing films of 2022 (In-year releases)
Rank	Title	Distributor	Domestic gross
1	Minions: The Rise of Gru	Universal Pictures	$21,663,531
2	Avatar: The Way of Water	Disney	$17,364,282
3	Jurassic World Dominion	Universal Pictures	$11,794,702
4	Thor: Love and Thunder	Disney	$11,184,471
5	Doctor Strange in the Multiverse of Madness	Disney	$10,562,809
6	Lightyear	Walt Disney Pictures	$7,580,834
7	Sonic the Hedgehog 2	Paramount Pictures	$5,668,280
8	Top Gun: Maverick	Paramount Pictures	$4,932,459
9	Black Panther: Wakanda Forever	Disney	$3,912,039
10	Sing 2	United International Pictures	$3,632,615

== See also ==
- 2022 in Argentina

Preceded by 2021 Box office number-one films	Box office number-one films 2022	Succeeded by 2023 Box office number-one films
