= Ana Wolfermann =

Venezuelan actress

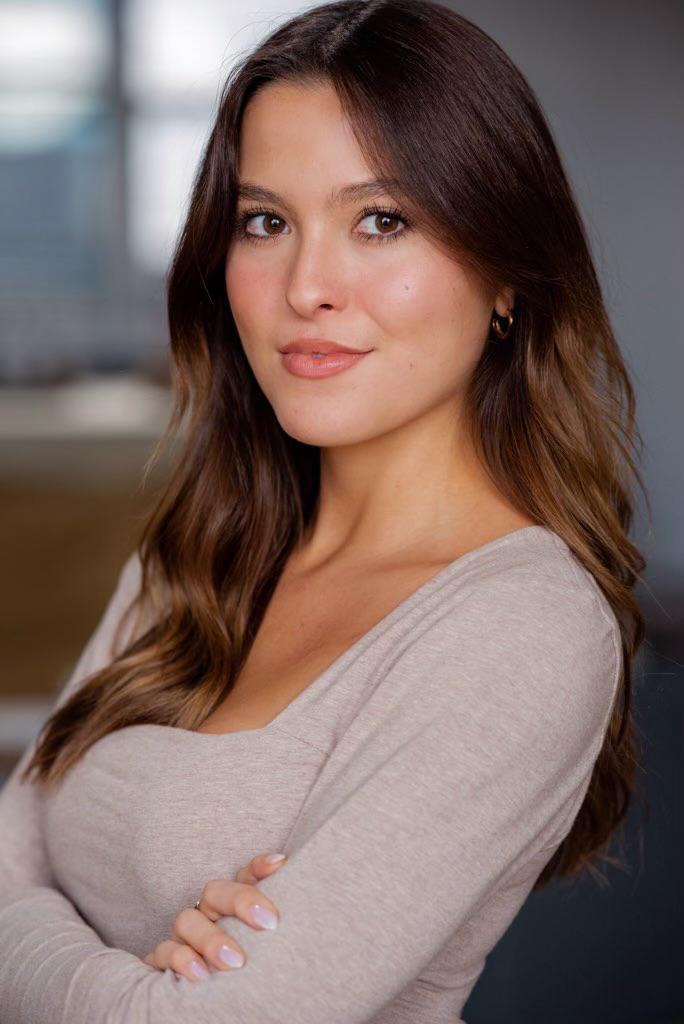
- Born: Ana Gabriela Wolfermann; 20 March 2001 (age 25); Caracas, Venezuela
- Education: University of Notre Dame
- Occupation: Actress
- Years active: 2015–present

Ana Gabriela Wolfermann (born 20 March 2001) is a Venezuelan actress. She is known for her role as Rosie Rivera on Telemundo's Netflix series Mariposa de Barrio and for her rising social media presence through her TikTok account.

She has lived in Miami, Florida since her family immigrated to the United States in 2008. She now resides in New York.

== Education ==
Ana Wolfermann graduated from Coral Gables Senior High School in Miami, Florida in 2019 with a Bilingual International Baccalaureate Diploma. Then she went on to study film, television, and theatre at the University of Notre Dame, graduating with a Bachelor of Arts Degree in 2023.

== Career ==
At 14 years old, she made her debut in Telemundo's television series, Bajo el mismo cielo. She played the young version of Adela Morales (protagonist). In 2016, Wolfermann portrayed Sara Aguilar in television series Eva la Trailera where she shared scenes with Edith González and Javier Díaz Dueñas.

For 2017, she was chosen in the main cast of television series Mariposa de Barrio, now streaming on Netflix internationally. She portrayed teenage Rosie Rivera from the ages of 12–17, sister of the famous Mexican singer Jenni Rivera, and shared scenes with actors such as Angélica Celaya, Samadhi Zendejas and Gabriel Porras. In a Telemundo live digital interview in 2018, Wolfermann explained that the role of Rosie Rivera allowed her to truly develop her talent at 15 years old, as she was challenged with interpreting scenes of complex psychological trauma, rebellion, fights, sexual abuse, and drug and alcohol consumption.

Also, she was part of the main cast in the episode of "El Milagro del Niño Diego" in Telemundo's mini series Milagros de Navidad. She played Gabriela Johnson and shared scenes with Litzy Dominguez, who played her mother.

In 2018, Wolfermann played Sandy Ryan in Telemundo's television series Mi familia perfecta. She shared scenes with actors such as Gala Montes, Jorge Luis Moreno, Sabrian Seara and Paulina Matos.

In 2021, Wolfermann was cast in the Disney+ Gina Yei, as Ruby Rubí, a character that lead Wolfermann to record her first songs with Walt Disney Records as part of her role. Her songs "La Queen" and "Mucho para ti bebé" were written by Daniel Alberto Espinoza, José Sabino, Omar Luis Sabino, Somos Productions and Vladimir Perez.

== Other work ==
=== Theatre ===
In 2019, Wolfermann played the lead role of Felicia Alvarado in Anne García-Romero's, Staging the Daffy Dame, production at the University of Notre Dame, directed by Kevin Dreyer.

=== Content creation ===
In 2020, when the pandemic began, Wolfermann began to create videos on TikTok. On her social media she shares her college lifestyle videos, her personal goals, advice to young girls, and her fashion interests, while focusing on promoting positivity, creativity and love.

=== Podcast ===
In the summer of 2022, Wolfermann launched her first episode of a podcast called Creating Happiness, a weekly conversation about life as a college student, personal growth, accomplishing goals, living with gratitude, cultivating relationships, and taking control of your own happiness.

=== Host ===
Beginning her junior year at the University of Notre Dame, Wolfermann was selected to work for Fighting Irish Media as the university's athletic host at football, basketball, and volleyball games.

== Recognitions ==
In 2021, she was awarded best local Tik Toker in Miami Magazine.

== Filmography ==
Television
Year	Title	Role	Produced by
2025	Velvet: El nuevo imperio		Telemundo/NBC
2021	Gina Yei	Ruby Rubí	Disney Plus
2018	Mi familia perfecta	Sandy Ryan	Telemundo/NBC
2017	Milagros de Navidad	Gabriela Johnson	Telemundo/NBC
2017	Mariposa de Barrio	Rosie Rivera	Telemundo/NBC
2016	Claritin Commercial	Clarita	Telemundo/NBC
2016	Eva la Trailera	Sara Aguilar	Telemundo/NBC
2015	Bajo el mismo cielo	Adela Morales	Telemundo/NBC

Stage
Year	Title	Role	Produced by
2020	Anti-Racist Theatre Showcase "Good Cuban Girls"	Marisol	University of Notre Dame
2019	Staging the Daffy Dame	Felicia Alvarado	University of Notre Dame
2016	The Frog, the Princess, and the King	The Princess	Micro Theatre Miami & Sociedad Actoral Hispanoamericana
2016	Los Locos Adams	Ensemble	Sociedad Actoral Hispanoamericana
2012	Young Miracles Showcase	Annie	Actors PlayHouse Theatre
2012	Cats Jr.	Victoria	Actors PlayHouse Theatre
