= List of 2024 box office number-one films in Argentina =

This is a list of films which placed number-one at the weekend box office in Argentina during 2024. Amounts are in American dollars.

== Number-one films ==
#	Weekend end date	Film	Box office	Openings in the top ten	Ref.
1	7 January 2024	Wish	$456,699		
2	14 January 2024	Wish	$292,825		
3	21 January 2024	Wish	$179,011	Night Swim #3; Poor Things #4	
4	28 January 2024	Wish	$116,924		
5	4 February 2024	Wish	$109,431		
6	11 February 2024	Migration	$126,655	The Holdovers #4	
7	18 February 2024	Migration	$84,938		
8	25 February 2024	Migration	$110,991		
9	3 March 2024	Migration	$120,601		
10	10 March 2024	Kung Fu Panda 4	$1,342,169	All of Us Strangers #5	
11	17 March 2024	Kung Fu Panda 4	$944,972		
12	24 March 2024	Kung Fu Panda 4	$520,853		
13	31 March 2024	One Life	$33,725		
14	7 April 2024	The First Omen	$283,023		
15	14 April 2024	Kung Fu Panda 4	$325,031	Back to Black #3	
16	21 April 2024	Kung Fu Panda 4	$159,115		
17	28 April 2024	Kung Fu Panda 4	$150,652		
18	5 May 2024	The Fall Guy	$142,002	Love Lies Bleeding #7	
19	12 May 2024	Kingdom of the Planet of the Apes	$1,441,874		
20	19 May 2024	Kingdom of the Planet of the Apes	$746,521		
21	26 May 2024	Kingdom of the Planet of the Apes	$427,084		
22	2 June 2024	Kingdom of the Planet of the Apes	$297,075		
23	9 June 2024	Kingdom of the Planet of the Apes	$156,961	The Watchers #2	
24	16 June 2024	Inside Out 2	$5,603,461		
25	23 June 2024	Inside Out 2	$5,937,001		
26	30 June 2024	Inside Out 2	$2,020,316		
27	7 July 2024	Inside Out 2	$1,821,473	Juniper #2	
28	14 July 2024	Inside Out 2	$1,189,152	Twisters #3	
29	21 July 2024	Despicable Me 4	$1,811,298		
30	28 July 2024	Deadpool & Wolverine	$5,583,647		
31	4 August 2024	Deadpool & Wolverine	$2,675,535		
32	11 August 2024	Deadpool & Wolverine	$1,544,852	The Bikeriders #5	
33	18 August 2024	Deadpool & Wolverine	$839,092	Alien: Romulus #2	
34	25 August 2024	Deadpool & Wolverine	$488,506	The Crow #5; Kinds of Kindness #6	
35	1 September 2024	Deadpool & Wolverine	$352,474	The Forge #7	
36	8 September 2024	It Ends with Us	$3,600,000	Beetlejuice Beetlejuice #2	
37	15 September 2024	Speak No Evil	$138,660		
38	22 September 2024	Speak No Evil	$106,443		
39	29 September 2024	Speak No Evil	$119,804		
40	6 October 2024	Speak No Evil	$70,283		
41	13 October 2024	The Wild Robot	$649,713		
42	20 October 2024	The Wild Robot	$254,428	Smile 2 #2	
43	27 October 2024	The Wild Robot	$248,347		
44	3 November 2024	The Wild Robot	$252,933		
45	10 November 2024	The Wild Robot	$186,941	The Room Next Door #2	
46	17 November 2024	Longlegs	$186,955		
47	24 November 2024	Wicked	$321,804		
48	1 December 2024	Moana 2	$3,383,617		
49	8 December 2024	Moana 2	$1,647,544	The Lord of the Rings: The War of the Rohirrim #5	
50	15 December 2024	Moana 2	$835,984		
51	22 December 2024	Mufasa: The Lion King	$1,832,891		
52	29 December 2024	Mufasa: The Lion King	$1,217,777		

== Highest-grossing films ==
Highest-grossing films of 2024 (In-year releases)
Rank	Title	Distributor	Domestic gross
1	Inside Out 2	Walt Disney Pictures	$30,139,693
2	Deadpool & Wolverine	Walt Disney Pictures	$15,584,444
3	Despicable Me 4	Universal Pictures	$15,497,776
4	Moana 2	Disney	$10,788,751
5	Mufasa: The Lion King	Disney	$8,269,868
6	Kung Fu Panda 4	Universal Pictures	$6,038,402
7	Gladiator II	Paramount	$4,582,577
8	It Ends with Us	Sony Pictures Releasing	$4,500,000
9	Kingdom of the Planet of the Apes	Disney	$4,142,377
10	The Wild Robot	Universal Pictures	$2,543,573

== See also ==
- List of 2022 box office number-one films in Argentina
- 2024 in Argentina

Preceded by 2023 Box office number-one films	Box office number-one films 2024	Succeeded by 2025 Box office number-one films
