= Fighting Irish (disambiguation) =

The Notre Dame Fighting Irish are the athletic teams that represent the University of Notre Dame.

Fighting Irish may also refer to:

- "The Fighting Irish", an episode of 30 Rock
- "Fighting Irish" (Family Guy), an episode of Family Guy
- Fighting Irish Media, a sports video production company
- "Fighting Irish", a song by Drake released during his feud with Kendrick Lamar
