= Isa TK+ =

2009–10 season of Colombian television series

- Isa TK+ intertitle
- Genre: Telenovela
- Created by: Mariela Romero; Gino Berríos; Julio César Mármol Junior; Daniel González
- Starring: María Gabriela de Faría; Reinaldo Zavarce; Willy Martin; Micaela Castellotti; Carolina Gaitán; Ricardo Abarca.
- Opening theme: "Sigo al Corazón", performed by Isa TKM
- Country of origin: Colombia
- Original language: Spanish
- No. of seasons: 1
- No. of episodes: 120

Production
- Executive producer: José Vicente Scheuren
- Production locations: Bogotá, Colombia
- Cinematography: Arturo Manuit T. Pablo Garro
- Running time: 42 minutes
- Production companies: Nickelodeon Latin America; Sony Pictures Television; Teleset

Original release
- Network: Nickelodeon Latin America
- Release: 28 September 2009 – 26 March 2010

Related
- Isa TKM (season 1)

Isa TK+ (Isa Te Quiero Más) is the second season of the Nickelodeon Latin America production, Isa TKM, produced with Sony Pictures Television and Teleset of Colombia. Production began in July 2009, and it premiered on 28 September 2009 in Latin America. It premiered in Brazil on 5 April 2010.

== History ==
The season, written by Julio César Mámol Junior, Gino Berríos and Daniel Gonzalez, was produced in Colombia. "Isa TK+ is the evolution of Isa TKM, and we are happy to bring this production together with Nickelodeon to various countries in Latin America," said Sony Pictures Television vice president of development programs and production Marlon Quintero. It featured María Gabriela de Faría, Reinaldo Zavarce, Willy Martin, and Micaela Castelotti. Milena Torres guest-starred, and Carolina Gaitán and Ricardo Abarca were newcomers.

When speaking of the second season renewal, Tatiana Rodriguez, Latin America vice president of programming and creative strategy had this to say:

"After the incredible success and acceptance of Isa TKM in Latin America and United States, [it] was a natural decision for us to proceed with one of the most beloved stories of the channel. For Nickelodeon our viewers are most important, and that's a reason for [our] commitment to quality programming. We are confident that [it] captivates not only for its plot but also for the great production work."

== Filming ==
Isa TK+ began filming in mid-July 2009. It was recorded in Barranquilla and Bogotá, except for scenes in the first episodes with Milena Torres which were filmed in Venezuela because Torres could not travel to Colombia with the rest of the cast at the time; she later went to Colombia to film episodes 25 to 41. Sixty to 70 episodes were planned, wrapping in mid-November or early December of that year.

== Synopsis ==
Since the ending of Isa TKM, Isabella "Isa" Pasqualli and her band have become successful worldwide. She has signed a contract with the Zafiro record label, which will send her abroad to study at Colegio Bravo (a school for young artists). Linda Luna ("Gordilinda", her best friend) has also received a scholarship to Bravo to study ballet. Alejandro "Alex" Ruiz (Isa's boyfriend) and Reinaldo "Rey" Galán (Gordilinda's boyfriend) are also going to Bravo – Alex to study guitar, and Rey to study acting.

Catalina Bernabeu and her sidekick, Jessica "Jess" Chen, want to ruin Isa's career, win Alex' affections and get Linda expelled; Sebastian Lorenzo ("Sebas") tries to win Isa's heart. Rey and Linda's new classmates, Sandra Centeno ("Sandijuela") and Javier "Javi" Mooner, are attracted to them. Principal Violeta Marindo ("La Tamarindo") is a sour woman who dislikes Isa and her friends. Cristina Ricalde ("Cristarantula", the main antagonist from the previous series) returns to get revenge on Isa and her friends.

== Cast ==
=== Main cast ===
- María Gabriela de Faría as Isabella Pascuali
- Reinaldo Zavarce as Alejandro Ruiz ("Alex")
- Willy Martin as Reinaldo Galán ("Rey")
- Micaela Castellotti as Linda Luna ("Gordilinda")
- Carolina Gaitán as Catalina Bernabeu ("Cataclismica")
- Ricardo Abarca as Sebastian Lorenzo ("Sebas")
- Milena Torres as Cristina Ricalde ("Cristarántula")

=== Supporting cast ===
- Yaneth Waldman as Violeta Marindo ("La Tamarindo")
- Sebastián Vega as Enrique Toro ("Kike")
- Mickie Moreno as Mateo Flores
- Vanessa Blandón as Natalia Tarazona ("Naty")
- Gabriela Cortés as Jessica Chen ("Jess")
- Juan Sebastián Quintero as Javier Mooner ("Javi")
- Diana Neira Canales as Sandra Centeno ("Sandijuela")
- Natalia Reyes as Fabiana Medina ("Fabi")
- Anderson Otalvaro as Fernando Jimenez ("Nando")
- Viviana Pulido as Agata Montenegro ("Monteblack")
- Mauro Urquijo as Alvaro Lorenzo
- Salomé Quinteros as Marisol
- Juan Carlos Messie as director Andy Roca
- Adriana Silva as Cecilia, a teacher
- Jean Carlos Posada as Abelardo Flores
- Linda Carreño as Camila Flores
- Julio Sánchez as Francisco, a teacher

=== Guest stars ===
- Juan Fernando Sánchez as Vladimir Lugozi
- Santiago Ramundo as Luca
- Willy Martin as Grandmother Galán
- Diana Neira Canales as Samanta Centeno

== Characters ==
The cast of Isa TK+: (left to right) Willy Martin as Rey Galán, Micaela Castelotti as Linda Luna, Maria Gabriela de Faria as Isa, Reinaldo Zavarce as Alex Ruiz, Carolina Gaitán as Catalina Bernabeu, and Ricardo Abarca as Sebastian Lorenzo

- Isabella "Isa" Pasquali: An 18-year-old with a radiant personality and a sweet voice
- Alejandro "Alex" Ruiz: Isa's boyfriend
- Linda "Gordilinda" Luna: Isa's sensitive, funny, charismatic and loyal best friend
- Reinaldo "Rey" Galán: Linda's somewhat-conceited boyfriend
- Catalina "Cataclismica" Bernabeu: A two-faced antagonist
- Sebastián "Sebas" Lorenzo: A popular boy who falls in love with Isa
- Cristina "Cristarantula" Ricalde: Principal Violeta's niece and the main antagonist of the previous series
- Violeta Marindo "La Tamarindo": The principal of Colegio Bravo
- Enrique "Kike" Toro: Alex' quirky roommate and best friend
- Natalia "Naty" Tarazona: Isa's roommate
- Jessica Chen ("Jess"): Catalina's roommate and sidekick
- Javier "Javi" Mooner: One of Alex' new friends and Rey's rival
- Sandra "Sandijuela" Centeno: Rey's acting classmate and friend
- Fabiana "Fabi" Medina: One of Isa's roommates and a friend of Sebas
- Agata "Monteblack" Montenegro: Violeta's chum and hall monitor of the girls' dormitory
- Alvaro Lorenzo: Sebas' father and owner of a rival record label
- Andy Roca: Creative principal of Colegio Bravo
- Abelardo Flores: The school's janitor and handyman, and a good friend of Isa and Alex

== Viewership ==
Isa TK+ led the ratings among viewers aged 12 to 17 in several Latin American countries. When it aired on Nickelodeon Brazil, it ranked first among children aged 7 to 12, second among children aged 4 to 11, and second among viewers aged 12 to 17 across all pay television channels. In 2010, it was also the second most-watched program on Brazilian pay television among viewers aged 7 to 12.

== See also ==
- Isa TKM
