= Freytes =

Freytes is a family name. Notable people with the surname include:

- Celeste Freytes (born 1950), Puerto Rican academic administrator
- David Freytes (born 1989), Venezuelan actor, director, screenwriter
- Juan Pablo Freytes (born 2000), Argentine footballer
- Manny Freytes (born 1974) New York, NY, Night Club DJ, Music Producer, House Music, Techno
