= Pacífico (film) =

2026 Sci-fi film directed by Gonzalo Gutierrez

- Official film poster
- Directed by: Gonzalo Gutierrez
- Written by: Natacha Caravia; Luis E. Langlemey; Constanza Cabrera; Lucila Podestá
- Story by: Andrés Gelós
- Produced by: Mauricio Brunetti; Guido Rud
- Starring: Claudio Cataño; María Gabriela de Faría; Manolo Cardona; Ricardo Abarca; Christopher von Uckermann; Patricia Castañeda
- Cinematography: Matías Nicolás
- Edited by: Martín Blousson; Guille Gatti
- Music by: Pablo Fuu
- Production companies: FilmSharks International; Government of Colombia; Patagonia Films
- Distributed by: Nashe Kino; Splendid Films
- Release date: July 8, 2026 (BiFan)
- Running time: 105 minutes
- Countries: Colombia; Argentina
- Language: Spanish
- Budget: $10 million

Pacífico (also known internationally as Pacific) is a 2026 Spanish-language sci-fi monster and adventure film directed by Argentine filmmaker and visual effects artist Gonzalo "G.G." Gutiérrez. Billed as one of the most expensive and ambitious Spanish-language science fiction films produced, the film is an international co-production primarily involving Argentina and Colombia.

== Cast ==
- Claudio Cataño as Azul
- María Gabriela de Faría as Erika
- Manolo Cardona as Eber
- Ricardo Abarca as Mateo
- Christopher von Uckermann as Tiago
- María Nela Sinisterra as Nazira
- Patricia Castañeda as Julia
- Diana Neira as Anita
- Francesca Luce Cardinale as Nina
- Sofía Blanchet as Lorelei

== Production ==
The film was developed as an elevated creature feature with a reported budget of approximately $10 million USD, utilizing a mix of practical creature effects and high-end digital visual effects. Director Gonzalo Gutiérrez transitioned into live-action genre filmmaking following his background in visual effects and animation.

Principal photography took place primarily in Colombia (including Bogotá and coastal regions). The screenplay was written by Natacha Caravia, Luis E. Langlemey, Constanza Cabrera, and Lucila Podestá, expanding on an original concept by Andrés Gelós. It was produced by Mauricio Brunetti through Patagonia Films and Guido Rud through FilmSharks, with María Florencia Lemoine serving as executive producer.

== Release ==
Pacífico was heavily promoted at the Cannes Film Market before securing its international festival debut. It premiered globally at South Korea's Bucheon International Fantastic Film Festival (BIFAN) on July 8, 2026.
