= Joseph Marcell =

British actor (born 1948)

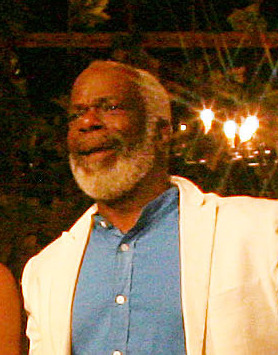
- Marcell in 2014
- Born: 18 August 1948 (age 78); Castries, Saint Lucia
- Education: University of Sheffield; Royal Central School of Speech and Drama
- Occupations: Actor, comedian
- Years active: 1969–present
- Spouse(s): Judith M. Midtby (m. 1975; div. 1980) Joyce T. Walsh (m. 1995)
- Children: 2

Joseph Marcell (born 18 August 1948) is a Saint Lucian-born British actor and comedian. He is best known for his role as Geoffrey Butler, the butler on the NBC sitcom The Fresh Prince of Bel-Air from September 1990 until the show ended in May 1996.

== Early life and education ==
Born in Saint Lucia, he moved to the United Kingdom when he was eight years old and grew up in Peckham, South London. Marcell currently lives in Banstead, Surrey.

He studied speech and dance at the Central School of Speech and Drama.

== Career ==
As a member of the Royal Shakespeare Company, he appeared in productions of Othello and A Midsummer Night's Dream. He has also appeared in feature films and on television in Britain. He serves on the board of the Shakespeare's Globe Theatre in London where he featured in a nationwide production of Shakespeare's Much Ado About Nothing and King Lear.

He played Gonzalo in Shakespeare’s play The Tempest at Sam Wanamaker Playhouse in May 2016. He also played Solly Two Kings in the play by August Wilson, Gem of the Ocean at the Tricycle Theatre, in London, in January 2016. Marcell began rehearsals as Titus Andronicus, in July 2017, for the La Grande Shakespeare Company, in La Grande, Oregon.

== Film and television ==
=== Film ===
Year	Title	Role	Notes
1974	Antony and Cleopatra	Eros	TV movie
1978	Real Live Audience	Second Man in Audience	TV movie
1987	Playing Away	Robbo	
1987	Cry Freedom	Moses	
1990	The Loser	Bartender	Short
1993	David Copperfield	Mr. Micawber (voice)	TV movie
1994	Sioux City	Dr. Darryl Reichert	
2004	A Beautiful Life	Juan	Short
2006	Diamond Real Estate	Mr. Rodeo	Short
2007	Rough Crossings	David George	TV movie
2007	That Samba Thing	Nelson	
2007	Man, Broken	George	Short
2010	The Santa Trap	Santa	Short
2012	Much Ado About Nothing	Leonato	
2013	Fedz	Eddie "Fast Eddie"	
2014	Return to Zero	Dr. Harrington	
2016	The Complete Walk: King Lear	King Lear	Short
2016	The Complete Walk: Henry V	Chorus (voice)	Short
2017	Wrapped up in Christmas	Jim Nash	TV movie
2018	Battledream Chronicles: A New Beginning	Zeus Thunderking	TV movie
2019	The Boy Who Harnessed the Wind	Chief Wembe	
2019	Hero: Inspired by the Extraordinary Life and Times of Mr. Ulric Cross	C. L. R. James	
2020	The Man in the Hat	The Old Man	
2021	The Exorcism of God	Father Michael Lewis	
2022	Folding	Errol	Short
2024	Hellboy: The Crooked Man	Reverend Nathaniel Armstrong Watts	
2025	The Thursday Murder Club	Father Mackie	
2026	Seahorse	Cyrus	

=== Television ===
Year	Title	Role	Notes
1978–79	Empire Road	Walter Isaacs	Main cast
1980	Fancy Wanders	Alastair	Episode: "With a Little Bit of Luck"
1981	Crown Court	-	Episode: "Cold Turkey: Part 1"
1983	The Professionals	Nero	Episode: "The Untouchables"
1983	Rumpole of the Bailey	Freddy Ruingo	Episode: "Rumpole and the Golden Thread"
1984	The Kit Curran Radio Show	Constantine	Recurring cast: season 1
1984	End of the Line	Harry	Main cast
1985	Juliet Bravo	Bold	Episode: "Hostage to Fortune"
1987	First Sight	Mik	Episode: "Some Day Man"
1988	Doctor Who	John	Episode: "Remembrance of the Daleks: Part Two"
1988	The Return of Shelley	Palmer	Episode: "Emergency Ward 9"
1989	CBS Summer Playhouse	Doc Holmes	Episode: "Outpost"
1989	Boon	Charlie Fowkes	Episode: "Arms and the Dog"
1989	The Bill	Wilmot	Episode: "Pressure"
1990	Desmond's	Matthew McFarlane	Episode: "Porkpies"
1990	Die Kinder	Joe	Episode: "Catastrophe Theory"
1990–96	The Fresh Prince of Bel-Air	Geoffrey Butler	Main cast
1992	EastEnders	Adrian Bell	Episode: 782 & 783
1993	Runaway Bay	Samuel	Episode: "The Robbery"
1997	Living Single	Reese	Episode: "Moonlight Savings Time"
1997	McLibel!	Robert Beavers	Episode: "Episode #1.1"
1998	Renford Rejects	Arthur Rodrigues	Episode: "Bowled Over"
1998	In the House	Minister	Episode: "My Pest Friend's Wedding"
1998	The Bill	Vernon Johnson	Episode: "One Man, Two Faces"
1998	Brothers and Sisters	Pastor Gittens	Episode: "Episode #1.1"
2003–04	The Bold and the Beautiful	Hudson	Regular cast
2005	Jericho	Clive Marlowe	Episode: "A Pair of Ragged Claws"
2006	EastEnders	Aubrey Valentine	Recurring Guest (8 episodes)
2008	A Touch of Frost	Joshua Ray	Episode: "Mind Games"
2008	Holby City	Professor Karl Webster	Episode: "You Do it to Yourself" & "Eighteen and a Half"
2014	Death in Paradise	Alexander Jackson	Episode: "The Man with the Golden Gun"
2020	The Sandman	African Grandfather (voice)	Recurring cast
2020	Ratched	Len Bronley	Episode: "Ice Pick" & "The Dance"
2021, 2024	Mammoth	Roger Buck	Main cast
2022	I Hate You	Ralph	Episode 1
2024	Queenie	Grandad Wilfred	Recurring cast
2024	Bel-Air	Roman	Season 3 Episode 6

== Stage ==
- King Lear, as King Lear
- A Midsummer Night's Dream, as Puck
- Gem of the Ocean (2016), as Solly Two Kings
- Lady Windermere's Fan (2018) as Lord Lorton, Vaudeville Theatre, London
- The Tempest (2016) as Gonzalo, Sam Wanamaker Playhouse, London
- Peter Pan (1982) as Nibs, the RSC at the Barbican
- Waiting for Godot (2000), Royal Festival Hall
