= Aisha Stambouli =

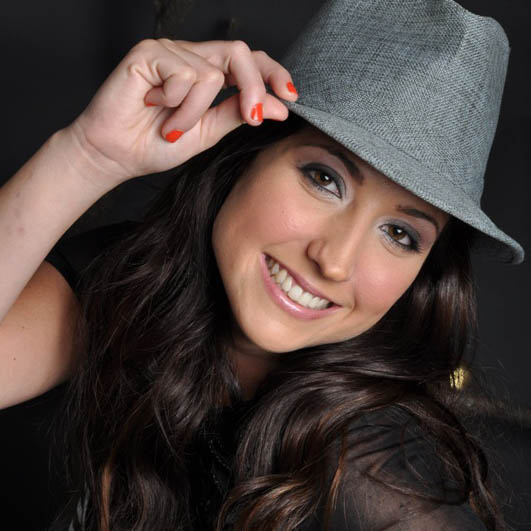

Background information
- Born: Irene Romina Stambouli Lazzereschi; April 11, 1984 (age 42); Caracas, Venezuela
- Genre: Latin pop
- Occupations: Singer-songwriter, actress
- Years active: 2009–present
- Label: Invencible Records

Aisha Stambouli is a Venezuelan actress, singer and songwriter.

== Biography ==
=== Early years ===
Stambouli was born in Caracas on April 11, 1984 as Irene Romina Stambouli Lazzereschi, to Víctor Stambouli Mattatia and Stefania Lazzereschi. She grew up in a Jewish family.

=== Artistic career ===
Her career began in 2009 with the main role in the juvenile telenovela ¡Qué clase de amor!; the telenovela also had a full album soundtrack, with Stambouli singing four of the 11 songs in it. In 2013, she participated in the historic telenovela Guerreras y Centauros, set in the 19th century during the days of the Battle of Carabobo, which was a central event in the Venezuelan War of Independence. Stambouli has also taken small roles in Venezuelan films such as Tamara and Des-autorizados.

In 2017, Stambouli released her album Tú la tienes que pagar, a cover of the French-Venezuelan singer Natusha, which reached the top of the Venezuelan Tropical Music charts, followed by her biggest success in the Venezuelan charts, Te quiero, a duet with Tito 10, her fellow co-star in ¡Qué clase de amor!.

On May 25, 2020, a second season of ¡Qué clase de amor!, now converted into a web-based format consisting of three episodes, was launched through the series' screenwriter Benjamin Cohen's Instagram account. The new season had to be recorded through video calls using different applications, such as WhatsApp, due to the COVID-19 pandemic and also because several of the actors were in different parts of the world.

== Personal life ==
Stambouli married her manager, the music producer Alberto Kauam on September 28, 2019. Kauam was found dead in his office on May 11, 2020, with a shot in his head. On May 30, 2020, Stambouli gave birth to a son, whom she named Eithan at the brit milah ceremony held in her house.

On April 1, 2021, Stambouli's father, Víctor, died of complications associated with COVID-19, and on April 27, 2021, her paternal uncle, the political analyst and university professor Andrés Stambouli, also died due to complications associated with COVID-19.

== Discography ==
=== Albums ===
- Más allá (2009)
- Tú la tienes que pagar (2017)

=== Singles ===
- ¡Qué clase de amor! (2016)
- Te quiero (2017)
- No te voy a olvidar (2018)
- Deseo (2020)
- Siempre te amaré (2021)

== Filmography ==
=== Telenovelas ===
Telenovela
Year	Title	Role	Notes
2009	¡Qué clase de amor!	Alejandra Martínez	
2013	Guerreras y Centauros	Barbarita	

=== Films ===
Telenovela
Year	Title	Role	Notes
2010	Des-Autorizados	Des 3 hada	
2016	Tamara	Receptionist	Directed by Elia Schneider
