= Gabriel Tarantini =

American actor

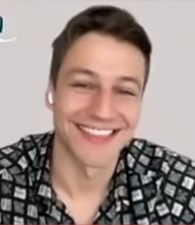
- Tarantini in 2023
- Born: Florida, United States
- Education: New York Film Academy
- Occupation: Actor
- Years active: 2008–present

Gabriel Tarantini is an American actor. He was born in Florida, United States but was raised in Venezuela and Italy. He graduated with a bachelor's degree in Fine Arts from the New York Film Academy in Los Angeles in 2014. He is best known for playing Andrés in the Venevisión telenovela Somos tú y yo, and played Benjamín González in Silvana sin lana, and Julián on Mi familia perfecta.

List of appearances in television series, specials and films
Year	Title	Roles	Notes
2008–2009	Somos tú y yo	Andrés	TV series
2016	Daisy	Danny	Short film
2016	Spark	Oscar	Short film
2016	Silvana sin lana	Benjamin González	TV series; 32 episodes
2017	Sheltered 1.0	Denver	Short film
2017	Vikki RPM	Federico "Fede" Toledo	TV series; 59 episodes
2018	Mi familia perfecta	Julián Guerrero	TV series; 68 episodes
2019	El Barón	Agent Justin Thompson	TV series; 38 episodes
2020	Decisiones: Unos ganan, otros pierden	Kike	Episode: "La guerra en casa"
2020–2021	100 días para enamorarnos	Benjamín Flores	TV series; 92 episodes
2023	@Gina Yei: WithAllMyHeartAndMore	Manuel	TV series; 12 episodes
