= List of 2025 box office number-one films in Argentina =

This is a list of films which placed number-one at the weekend box office in Argentina during 2025. Amounts are in American dollars.

== Number-one films ==
#	Weekend end date	Film	Box office	Openings in the top ten	Ref.
1	5 January 2025	Sonic the Hedgehog 3	$1,500,000	Nosferatu #3; Babygirl #5	
2	12 January 2025	Mufasa: The Lion King	$642,024		
3	19 January 2025	Mufasa: The Lion King	$650,444	Anora #5	
4	26 January 2025	Mufasa: The Lion King	$420,724	Wolf Man #3; A Real Pain #5	
5	2 February 2025	Mufasa: The Lion King	$302,437	A Complete Unknown #4	
6	9 February 2025	Mufasa: The Lion King	$256,669	Dog Man #2; The Brutalist #4; Flight Risk #5	
7	16 February 2025	Captain America: Brave New World	$1,669,918	Bridget Jones: Mad About the Boy #3	
8	23 February 2025	Captain America: Brave New World	$575,109	The Monkey #2; Conclave #5	
9	2 March 2025	Captain America: Brave New World	$458,737	September 5 #8	
10	9 March 2025	Captain America: Brave New World	$232,285	Small Things Like These #13	
11	16 March 2025	Captain America: Brave New World	$193,366		
12	23 March 2025	Snow White	$1,201,668		
13	30 March 2025	Snow White	$504,229	Black Bag #2	
14	6 April 2025	A Minecraft Movie	$3,700,000		
15	13 April 2025	The Amateur	$175,258		
16	20 April 2025	Snow White	$115,302	Drop #3	
17	27 April 2025	Star Wars: Episode III – Revenge of the Sith	$246,686		
18	4 May 2025	Thunderbolts*	$1,234,075		
19	11 May 2025	Thunderbolts*	$559,158		
20	18 May 2025	Final Destination: Bloodlines	$1,500,000		
21	25 May 2025	Lilo & Stitch	$5,421,212		
22	1 June 2025	Lilo & Stitch	$3,851,016		
23	8 June 2025	Lilo & Stitch	$2,642,594	Ballerina #2; The Phoenician Scheme #3	
24	15 June 2025	How to Train Your Dragon	$1,879,225		
25	22 June 2025	How to Train Your Dragon	$1,428,371	Elio #3	
26	29 June 2025	How to Train Your Dragon	$704,788	M3GAN 2.0 #4	
27	6 July 2025	Jurassic World: Rebirth	$2,173,705		
28	13 July 2025	Jurassic World: Rebirth	$1,284,398		
29	20 July 2025	Jurassic World: Rebirth	$900,454		
30	27 July 2025	The Fantastic Four: First Steps	$1,965,102	The Bad Guys 2 #3	
31	3 August 2025	The Fantastic Four: First Steps	$951,273		
32	10 August 2025	Freakier Friday	$838,392	Weapons #2	
33	17 August 2025	Freakier Friday	$676,847		
34	24 August 2025	Freakier Friday	$346,808	Nobody 2 #4; The Life of Chuck #5	
35	31 August 2025	Freakier Friday	$223,302	The Roses #2	
36	7 September 2025	The Conjuring: Last Rites	$4,400,000		
37	14 September 2025	Toy Story	$93,547		
38	21 September 2025	Toy Story	$72,280		
39	28 September 2025	Gabby's Dollhouse: The Movie	$121,317	Hamilton #2	
40	5 October 2025	Avatar: The Way of Water	$64,867	Dangerous Animals #3	
41	12 October 2025	Tron: Ares	$394,950	The Smashing Machine #3; Downton Abbey: The Grand Finale #4	
42	19 October 2025	Black Phone 2	$298,669		
43	26 October 2025	Black Phone 2	$262,895	Springsteen: Deliver Me from Nowhere #3	
44	2 November 2025	Black Phone 2	$170,559	Good Fortune #2	
45	9 November 2025	Predator: Badlands	$399,901	Roofman #3	
46	16 November 2025	Predator: Badlands	$213,474		
47	23 November 2025	Wicked: For Good	$451,824		
48	30 November 2025	Zootopia 2	$2,318,422		
49	7 December 2025	Five Nights at Freddy's 2	$1,232,525	The Threesome #5	
50	14 December 2025	Zootopia 2	$897,521	Bugonia #3	
51	21 December 2025	Avatar: Fire and Ash	$2,085,055		
52	28 December 2025	Avatar: Fire and Ash	$1,194,874		

== Highest-grossing films ==
Highest-grossing films of 2025 (In-year releases)
Rank	Title	Distributor	Domestic gross
1	Sonic the Hedgehog 3	Paramount Pictures International	$5,092,962
2	Captain America: Brave New World	Walt Disney Pictures	$1,797,754
3	Nosferatu	Universal Pictures	$1,385,334
4	Wolf Man	Universal Pictures	$276,141
5	Conclave	Sun Distribution	$220,529
7	A Complete Unknown	Walt Disney Pictures	$215,156
8	Babygirl	Sun Media	$202,723

== See also ==
- List of 2023 box office number-one films in Argentina
- List of Argentine films of 2025
- 2025 in Argentina

Preceded by 2024 Box office number-one films	Box office number-one films 2025	Succeeded by 2026 Box office number-one films
