= Don Quixote: The Ingenious Gentleman of La Mancha =

Don Quixote
- Directed by: David Beier; Dave Dorsey; Mahin Ibrahim; Austin Kolodney; Will Lowell; Drue Metz; Brandon Somerhalder; Alana Waksman; Jon YonKondy; Xu Zhang
- Screenplay by: Melanie Ansley; Elizabeth Eccher; Jonathan Maurer; Jamie Napoli; Amy Reedy; Michael Starr; Jordan Trippeer; Anthony Twarog
- Based on: Don Quixote by Miguel de Cervantes
- Produced by: Vanessa Pantley; Tarek Tohme
- Starring: Carmen Argenziano; Horatio Sanz; Luis Guzman; James Franco; Lin Shaye; Reinaldo Zavarce
- Cinematography: Carmen Emmi
- Edited by: Jordan Ledy
- Music by: Nathan Matthew David; Jeremy Lamb
- Release date: January 7, 2015 (Palm Springs)
- Running time: 83 minutes
- Country: United States
- Language: English

Don Quixote is a 2015 American adventure drama film starring Carmen Argenziano, Horatio Sanz, Luis Guzman, James Franco, Lin Shaye, and Reinaldo Zavarce. It is based on the novel of the same name by Miguel de Cervantes.

== Cast ==
- Carmen Argenziano as Don Quixote
- Horatio Sanz as Sancho Panza/Narrator
- Luis Guzmán as Farmer
- James Franco as Pasamonte
- Lin Shaye as The Grand Lady
- Vera Cherny as Dulcinea
- Lorena McGregor as Antonia
- Anthony Skordi as Father Nicolas
- Reinaldo Zavarce as Miguel
