= Sebastián Vega =

Colombian actor

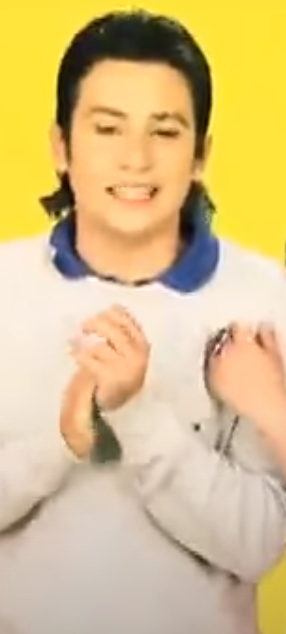
- Vega in 2012
- Born: June 18, 1987 (age 38); Bucaramanga, Colombia
- Occupation: Actor
- Spouse(s): Natalia Castillo (2011-2013); Valentina Ochoa Pardoux (2018–)

Sebastián Vega (Bucaramanga) is an actor from Colombia.

He is known for starring in the series A mano Limpia from RCN and being from the secondary distribution of Isa tk+ from Nickelodeon. In 2016 he starred in the Netflix series Narcos.

== Filmography ==
- 2005, Padres e hijos...Emilio
- 2008, Aqui no hay quien viva...Pablo Guerra
- 2008, El Cartel de los Sapos...Pepe cadena
- 2009, Tu voz estéreo...vários
- 2010, Isa tk+...Kike Toro
- 2010, A mano limpia...El Baby
- 2011, Popland!...Guga Mortols
- 2012/2013, A mano limpia 2...El baby
- 2013, Amo de casa...mauro
- 2013, Chica Vampiro...Nicolás De Black Mer Moon
- 2014, La Suegra...Luis Guillermo Burgos Valencia
- 2016, Narcos…Hugo Martinez Jr.
- 2021, El Cartel de los Sapos: el origen…Alonso Torres
- 2022, Pasión de Gavilanes…Félix Carreño
