= Alexandra Pomales =

American actress

- Born: July 4, 1995 (age 31); United States
- Occupation: Actress

Alexandra Pomales (born July 4, 1995, in United States), is an American actress and TV host.

She is known internationally for participating in telenovelas of Telemundo and Nickelodeon (Latin America). In 2014, she participated in the ABC TV series Killer Women as a series regular and was host of her own show called Turn IT On in 2013. She is of Puerto Rican descent.

== Filmography ==
Television
Year	Title	Role	Notes
2010	El fantasma de Elena	Lucía	Supporting role
2011	La casa de al lado	Andrea Ruiz	Supporting role
2011	Grachi	Betty	Supporting role
2014	Killer Women	Hailee Parker	Supporting role Season 1, episode 1: "La Sicaria"; Season 1, episode 2: "Some Men Need Killing"; Season 1, episode 4: "The Siren"; Season 1, episode 7: "Daughter of the Alamo"
2014	En otra piel	Valeria García	Supporting role
2016	Silvana sin lana	Lucia "Lucha" Gallardo	Supporting role
2017	Milagros de Navidad	Karen Diaz	Lead role

== Awards and nominations ==
Year	Award	Category	Telenovela	Result
2017	Miami Life Award	Best Supporting Actress	Silvana Sin Lana	Won
