= La virgen de la calle =

Television series

- Genre: Telenovela
- Created by: Basilio Álvarez
- Based on: Juana la virgen by Perla Farías
- Written by: Karin Valecillos; Daniel Dannery; Ilay Eskinazi; Basilio Álvarez
- Screenplay by: Basilio Álvarez
- Story by: Perla Farías
- Directed by: Felipe Aguilar; César Manzano
- Creative director: Mario Rinaldi
- Starring: María Gabriela de Faría; Juan Pablo Llano; Caridad Canelón; Marjorie Magri; Rosanna Zanetti
- Music by: Guido Melillo
- Opening theme: "Virgen de la calle" by Sujeid Mijares
- Original language: Spanish
- No. of episodes: 120

Production
- Executive producer: Rodolfo Hoyos
- Cinematography: José Rojas; Frank Toledo
- Editor: José Luis Varón
- Production companies: RTI Producciones; Televisa

Original release
- Network: Televen
- Release: March 3 – August 29, 2014

Related
- Jane the Virgin

La virgen de la calle is a telenovela premiered on Venezuelan broadcast channel Televen on March 3, 2014, and concluded on August 29, 2014, based on the Venezuelan drama produced by Radio Caracas Televisión, entitled Juana la virgen. Recorded in RCTV studios, the show is created Perla Farías and produced by RTI Producciones along with Televisa.

It stars María Gabriela de Faría as Juana Pérez — A young high school student who becomes pregnant by mistake and unknowingly, along with Juan Pablo Llano as Mauricio Vega, Caridad Canelón as Azucena Pérez, Marjorie Magri as Desirée Rojas and Rosanna Zanetti as Carlota Rivas.

== Plot ==
Mauricio Vega, director of the magazine La verdad, is desperate for a son and heir, and he and his wife decide to use the services of a surrogate mother. Unfortunately, in the hospital the name of the surrogate is confused with that of Juana, a young student. Juana is artificially inseminated with Mauricio's semen. Juana starts work at "La verdad" and the two fall in love.

== Cast ==
- María Gabriela de Faría as Juana Pérez
- Juan Pablo Llano as Mauricio Vega
- Eileen Abad as Ana María Pérez
- Dylan Abreu as Juanito
- Yuliana Addaf as Teresa
- Daniel Alvarado as Ernesto Molina
- Gioia Arismendi as Enriqueta Márquez
- Paula Bevilacqua as Lola
- César Román Bolívar as Piraña
- Luz Adriana Bustamante as Inés
- Armando Cabrera as Arsenio
- Caridad Canelón as Azucena Pérez
- Ángel Casallas as Gabriel
- Arán de las Casas as Willy
- Laura Chimaras as Jessica
- Silvana Continanza as Petra
- Gonzalo Cubero as Castillo
- Fernando da Silva as Charly
- Jhon De Agrela as Torres
- Miguel de León as Rogelio Rivas
- Diana Díaz as Rosa Andrade
- Stephanie Cardone Fulop as Susana
- Juan Carlos García as Alfredo Rivas
- Jerónimo Gil as Salvador
- Christian McGaffney as David Uzcategui
- Hector Mercado as Pedrito'
- Alexander Solórzano as Carlos
- Rosanna Zanetti as Carlota Rivas
- Julie Restifo as Lucía de Rivas
- Nacho Huett as Humberto Rivas
- Rossanny Lanza Malavé as Periodista de la revista La verdad
