= ¡Qué clase de amor! =

Venezuelan television series

- Genre: Telenovela
- Created by: Benjamín Cohen
- Written by: Benjamín Cohen; Ana Teresa Sosa; Verónica Álvarez; Gemys Pérez
- Directed by: Grazio D' Angelo; Manuel Díaz Casanova
- Creative director: Carmen García Vilar
- Starring: Andrés Gómez; Aisha Stambouli; Joan Manuel Larrad; Mayela Caldera; Georgina Palacios; Mark Colina; Rosalinda Serfaty
- Opening theme: "Qué clase de amor" by Manuel Larrad and Aisha Stambouli
- Country of origin: Venezuela
- Original language: Spanish
- No. of seasons: 1
- No. of episodes: 83

Production
- Executive producer: Carlos Ignacio García
- Producers: Orlando de Jesús Machado; Javier Rojas
- Production location: Venezuela
- Camera setup: Multi-camera
- Production company: BCC Producciones

Original release
- Network: Venevisión
- Release: April 20 – August 14, 2009

¡Qué clase de amor! (What Kind of Love!) is a 2009 Venezuelan juvenile telenovela produced by Venevisión and BCC Producciones in 2009. It stars Andrés Gómez and Aisha Stambouli as the main protagonists while Joan Manuel Larrad and Mayela Caldera star as the main antagonists. The telenovela premiered on Venevisión at the 6:00 pm timeslot.

== Plot ==
The story is set in an urban high school filled with adolescents who experience joys, sorrows, love and triumphs.

"Los Populares" is the name given to a group of the school's most popular and rebellious students. Its leader, Diego Padilla, is known as a casanova who attracts the attention of many girls. His girlfriend, Stefanie Mendoza, is considered the prettiest and most spoiled girl at the school. However, Diego eventually falls in love with Alejandra Martínez, a brilliant and intelligent student who is new to the school. Alejandra is very different from the type of girl Diego would normally be attracted to.

Diego approaches Alejandra and her nerd friends referred to as "Las Nerdas" with the sole purpose of seeking their assistance with his studies. However, with time, Alejandra will slowly conquer Diego's heart, and not even Stephanie, with her beauty, popularity and charms can stop Alejandra's and Diego's love. Alán Camacho, nicknamed "Alacrán", belongs to the group "Los Alacranes" which is composed of singers. For a long time, Alan has grown jealous of Diego's popularity, especially due to the fact that he is in love with Stephanie, though Stephanie rejected his love. Alan will set a trap for Alejandra to completely ruin Diego's image and reputation in the school.

== Cast ==
- Aisha Stambouli as Alejandra Martínez
- Andrés Gómez as Diego Padilla
- Joan Manuel Larrad as Alán Camacho "Alacrán"
- Mayela Caldera as Stefani Mendoza
- Georgina Palacios as Martha Pérez
- Mark Colina as Marcel Jiménez "El Destripador"
- Miguel Ángel Tovar as Manuel Colmenares "Manu"
- Giannina Alves as Milagros Pérez "Tita"'
- Andrés Sosa as Rafael Gómez "Rafa"
- Rosanna Zanetti as Andreína Figueroa
- Vanessa Hidalgo as Desiré Sánchez
- Juan Miguel Henriques as Félix Rodríguez
- María Eugenia d'Angelo as Romina Casanova
- Jaime Suárez as Samy Rodríguez
- Joaquín Araujo as Germán
- Rafael Gabeiras as Sebastián
- Jesús Alberto Vieira as Román
- Dayana Oliveros as Karla
- Wendy Bermejo as Magaly
- Carolina Muizzi as Sasha
- Rodolfo Salas as Leonardo
- Jessica Semeco as Leila
- Cesar Augusto Méndez as Abraham
- Anavir García as Cristinita
- Cesar D' La Torre as Caiman

=== Special Guests ===
- Rosalinda Serfaty as la Directora Ana María Sosa
- Ruddy Rodríguez as Aurora
- Samir Bazzi as Profesor Narciso o "El Papi Profe"
- Yulika Krausz as Pura

== Musical Themes ==
Nº "Que Clase de amor"	Title	Singer (s)	Comment
1	"Qué clase de amor"	Manuel Larrad y Aisha Stambouli / ¡Los Últimos de la Clase!	Tema principal de ¡Qué clase de amor!
2	"Quién diría"	Manuel Larrad / ¡Los Últimos de la Clase!	Canción de Alejandra y Diego
3	"Mi niña bonita"	Manuel Larrad / ¡Los Últimos de la Clase!	Canción de Tita y Manu
4	"Enamorarte de él"	Manuel Larrad / ¡Los Últimos de la Clase!	Canción de Andreina y Rafa
5	"Más allá"	Aisha Stambouli	Canción de Alejandra y Diego
6	"Esta Vez"	Aisha Stambouli	Canción de Alejandra
7	"Mi Centro"	Aisha Stambouli	Canción de Alejandra usada en el primer capitulo
8	"Como pa mi"	Manuel Larrad / ¡Los Últimos de la Clase!	Canción de Magaly y el "Papi" Profe
9	"Contigo Quiero"	Mark Colina	Canción de Martha y Marcel
10	"Loco por ti"	Manuel Larrad / ¡Los Últimos de la Clase!	Canción de Dessire y Félix
11	"Tu Recuerdo"	Jeanette Sarmiento	
