= Rosanna Zanetti =

Venezuelan actress

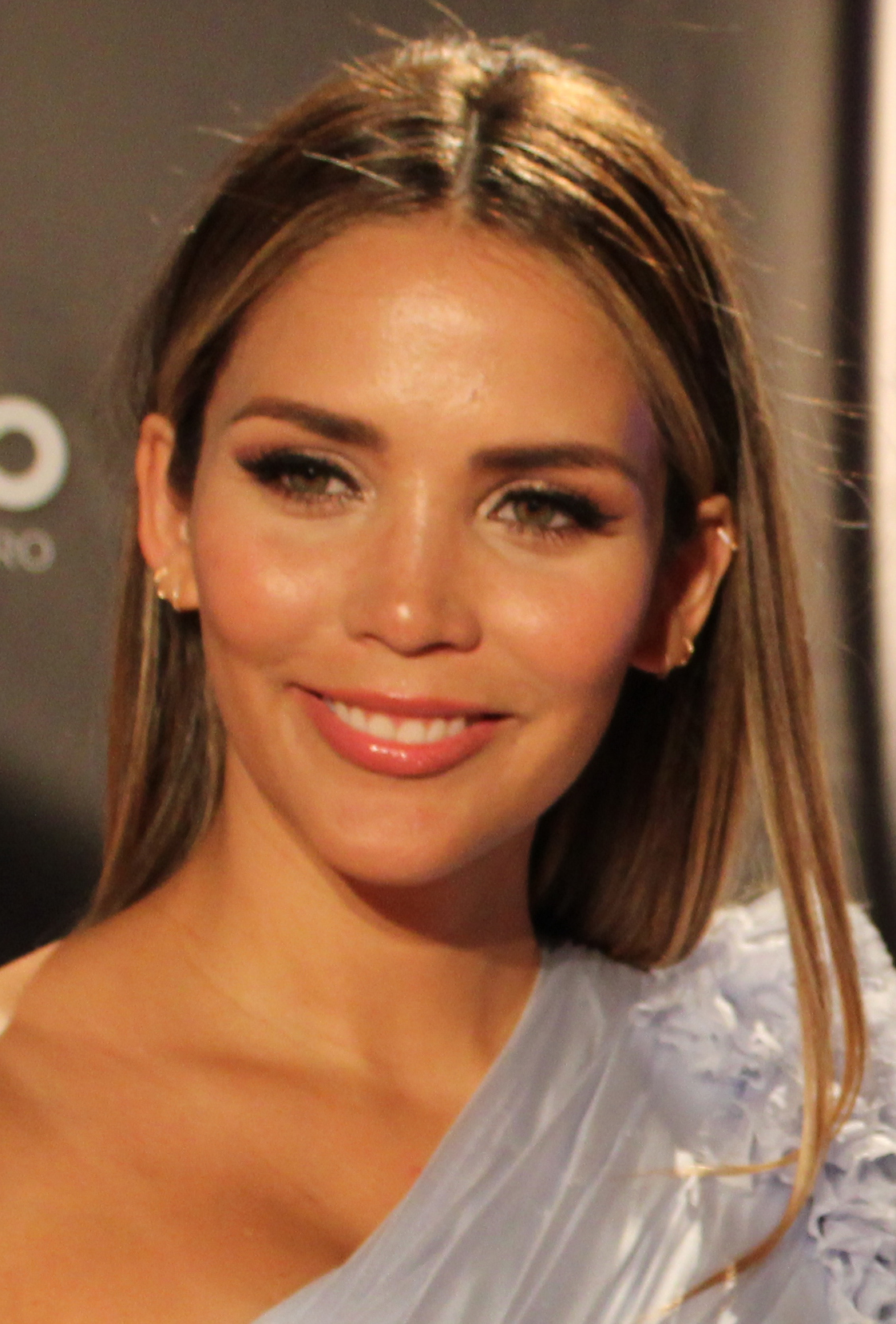
- Zanetti at the Starlite Gala in 2019
- Born: June 15, 1987 (age 37); Caracas, Venezuela
- Occupation: Actress
- Years active: 2006-present

Rosanna Zanetti (born on June 15, 1987, in Caracas, Venezuela), is a Venezuelan actress. She is best known for her roles in telenovelas ¡Qué clase de amor! where she landed her first starring role, Fanatikda where she was the protagonist, telenovela produced by TC Televisión, and Natalia del Mar where she was the youthful protagonist of the story.

== Career ==
Her first appearance in the world of acting was in the French film, 99 Francs, where she had a little special participation. In 2014, she landed her first role as a villain in the telenovela La virgen de la calle.

== Filmography ==
=== Film ===
Year	Title	Role	Notes
2006	99 Francs	Unknown role	Film debut

=== Television ===
Year	Title	Role	Notes
2009	¡Qué clase de amor!	Andreína	Television debut
2010	Fanatikda	Ailyn	
2011-2012	Natalia del mar	Patricia Uzcátegui	
2014	La virgen de la calle	Carlota Rivas Molina de Vega	
2015	Amor secreto	Altair	
