= List of Isa TKM episodes =

The following is an episode list for the MTV Tr3́s series Isa TKM.

No.	Title	Directed by	Written by	Original release date	Prod. code
1	"Who is Isa?"¿Quien es Isa?	Unknown	Unknown	September 29, 2008	101
2	"In the midst of the fight"En Medio de La Pelea	Unknown	Unknown	September 30, 2008	103
3	"The Invitation"La Invitación	Unknown	Unknown	October 1, 2008	105
4	"Romantic Lie"Mentira Romántica	Unknown	Unknown	October 2, 2008	108
5	"Good and Bad News"Buenas y Malas Noticias	Unknown	Unknown	October 3, 2008	102
6	"Lies with Short Legs"Mentiras con Patas Cortas	Unknown	Unknown	October 6, 2008	102
7	"Cocktail?"Coctel?	Unknown	Unknown	October 7, 2008	102
8	"Home Remedy"Remedio Casero	Unknown	Unknown	October 8, 2008	102
9	"Cristina's birthday gift"El Regalo de Cumpleaños De Cristina	Unknown	Unknown	October 9, 2008	102
10	"Chaos Within the Party"Caos Dentro de La Fiesta	Unknown	Unknown	October 10, 2008	102
11	"An Evening of Film"Una Tarde de Película	Unknown	Unknown	October 27, 2008	102
12	"Let's clean up"A limpiar se ha dicho	Unknown	Unknown	October 28, 2008	102
13	"On your marks, get set, go!"En sus marcas, listos, fuera!	Unknown	Unknown	October 29, 2008	103
14	"Secret Ingredients"Ingredientes secretos	Unknown	Unknown	October 30, 2008	104
