= Túkiti, crecí de una =

- Genre: Telenovela
- Created by: Ricardo Hernández Anzola
- Screenplay by: Carmen García Vilar; Giuliana Rodríguez; Rafael Elizalde; Sergio Espluga
- Directed by: Andrea Herrera Catalá; José Antonio Aguirre; Amado Dehesa
- Creative director: Carlos Medina
- Starring: Dexiree Bandes; María Gabriela de Faría; Gabriel Mantilla; Eugenio Keller; Laura Chimaras; José Ramón Barreto
- Opening theme: "Volar" by Dexiree Bandes
- Country of origin: Venezuela
- Original language: Spanish
- No. of episodes: 110

Production
- Executive producers: Laura Goldberg; Daniel Herrera
- Production company: Alter Producciones

Original release
- Network: RCTV
- Release: August 16, 2006 – January 23, 2007

Túkiti, crecí de una is a Venezuelan telenovela created by Ricardo Hernández Anzola for RCTV, and it that originally aired on Venezuelan broadcast channel RCTV from August 16, 2006 to January 23, 2007. It stars Dexiree Bandes, María Gabriela de Faría, Gabriel Mantilla, Eugenio Keller, Laura Chimaras, and José Ramón Barreto.

== Plot ==
Antonio (Eugenio Keller) is a 15-year-old boy who has problems at school and with girls his age, lives only with his mother Mildred (Dexiree Bandes) a single working woman and his little brother Pipo (Gabriel Mantilla) Who feels that his brother dominates him, his father had abandoned them for several years, when his brother's nanny can no longer take charge, his mother to punish him (for being rejected) decides that now he will be the one to watch every afternoon.

Wendy (María Gabriela de Faría) is one of Antonio's best friends, along with Jefferson (José Ramón Barreto), all three live in the same building, Wendy is deeply in love with Antonio but is unable to confess, Antonio only sees her As a 'friend' more and not as a couple.

Antonio and Jefferson are dazzled by the most beautiful girl of their school popular Amaranta (Laura Chimaras), but she already has a partner (Danny) so they will look for love in different places, but Antonio finally realizes that it is also In love with Wendy, with whom he finally ends up staying. Jefferson also manages to stay with Amaranta after breaking his relationship with Danny, who dropped out of school.

== Cast ==
=== Main ===
- Dexiree Bandes as Mildred
- María Gabriela de Faría as Wendy
- Gabriel Mantilla as Pipo
- Eugenio Keller as Antonio
- Laura Chimaras as Amaranta
- José Ramón Barreto as Jefferson

=== Recurring ===
- William Coss as Oscar
- Manuel Colmenares as Puro Cuento
- Francis Romero as Benigna
- Anastasia Stoliarova as Eva
- Karen Pita as Marité
- Mayra Méndez as Dubriska
- René Díaz as Dani
- Roberto de Blassi as Fernando
- Verónica Cortéz as Ivana
- Amado Zambrano as "Aceite de Motor"
- Vito Lonardo as Camacaro
- Jesús Seijas as Malanga
- Hernán Marcano as Cristóbal
- Armando Quintero as Don Pepe
- Liliana Chechile as Marjorie
- Roberto Montemarani as Arrozcoicoechea
- Ricardo Guerrero as El Violinista
