= Reinaldo Zavarce =

Venezuelan-American actor and singer (born 1984)

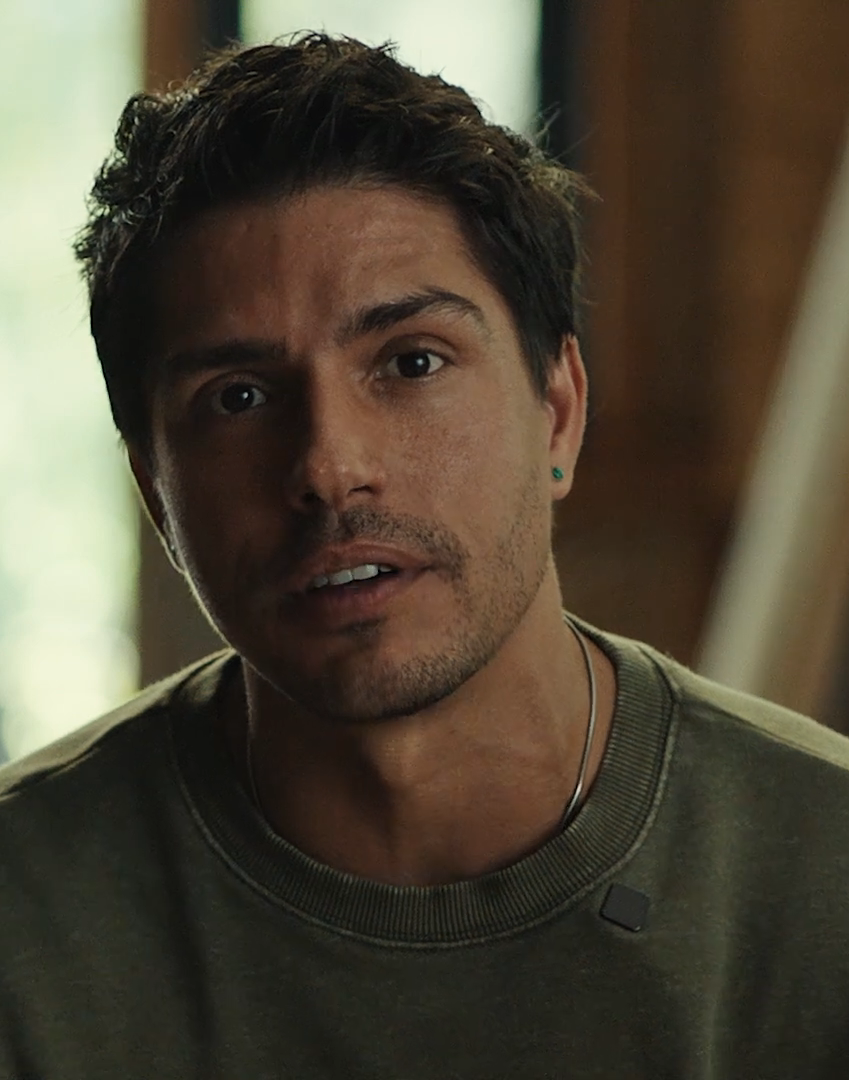
- Reinaldo Zavarce in 2024
- Born: Caracas, Venezuela
- Other names: Reinaldo Peche Zavarce, "Peche"
- Occupations: Actor and singer
- Known for: Isa TKM; Isa TK+

Reinaldo Zavarce Peche (known as PECHE) is a Venezuelan actor and singer born in Caracas, Venezuela, best known for his starring role as Alex in the Nickelodeon Latin America telenovela Isa TKM.

He hosted the orange carpet of the 2012 Kids’ Choice Awards for its Latin American broadcast.

== Music ==
He recorded several songs for the soundtrack of Isa TKM and Isa TK+.

Zavarce created the rock band “Panorama Express” which released its first EP "Directo a Shanghai" on April 3, 2012, its only single “Voy Donde Estés” (which also had a Brazilian Portuguese version called “Vou Por Voce”) debuted through Nickelodeon Latin America.

== Background ==
Reinaldo Zavarce (PECHE) was born in Caracas, Venezuela. He shares his first name with his father, Reinaldo, and his "Peche" with his mother, Laura Peche. He has two siblings, Andrea and Vicente.

An avid sports fan and talented athlete, Reinaldo played soccer on the professional youth team Venezuelan Venezuelan Deportivo Italia at the FIFA U-20 World Cup and won a scholarship to the Illinois Institute of Technology in Chicago to study administration and to play soccer. Zavarce returned to Venezuela after an injury, and resumed his studies at the Universidad Metropolitana in Caracas.

On May 5, 2022, he became a United States citizen.

== Career ==
In 2004, Zavarce attended a casting call for Venezuela television and subsequently participated in several popular telenovelas: Mujer con pantalones (Women Wearing Pants), Te tengo en salsa (I have you in Salsa), and Amante (Lovers).

In 2007 he participated (along with Maria Gabriela de Faria) on the telenovela Toda una dama (A Lady) for RCTV International playing the role of the son of a politician.

In 2008 he joined the cast of the Nickelodeon Latin America telenovela Isa TKM. The musical telenovela was written by Mariela Romero and debuted in Latin America on September 2008 and on MTV Tr3́s in June 2009. The series has given Zavarce recognition in several Latin American countries for his role as "Alex".

In 2008, he began work in Día naranja (Orange Day), directed by Venezuelan Alejandra Szeplaki. Zavarce starred as "Victor", a DJ affected by the probable pregnancy of his girlfriend. The film premiered in Venezuela on October 9, 2009.

== Filmography ==
=== Film ===
Year	Title	Role	Notes
2009	Día naranja	Víctor	
2014	Mateo	Mateo	Short film
2015	Don Quixote	Miguel	
2016	Last Resort	Rafa	Short film, also producer
2016	Ruta Madre	José Ibarra	

=== Television roles ===
Year	Title	Role	Notes
2005	Amantes	Alirio Bejarano	Recurring role
2006	Te tengo en salsa	Diego Sánchez	Starring
2007	Toda una dama	Guillermo "Guille" Galván	Starring
2008	Isa TKM	Alejandro "Alex" Ruiz	Starring
2009	Isa TK+	Alejandro "Alex" Ruiz	Starring
2012	Level Up	Hugo Vega	Episode: "A Leak Among Us"
2012	Julie and the Phantoms	Himself	Episode: "Festival"
2013	11-11: En mi cuadra nada cuadra	Juan José "Juanjo" Seminario	Main role; 75 episodes
2017	Jane the Virgin	Male Telenovela Star	Episode: "Chapter Sixty", "Chapter Seventy-Two"
2018	Brooklyn 99	Juan Ramirez-Xerpatico	Episode: "Honeymoon"

== Awards and nominations ==
- 2008: "Actor of the Year" (Meus Premios Nick)
- 2010: "Actor of the Year" (Kids’ Choice Awards Mexico)
