= List of 2026 box office number-one films in Argentina =

This is a list of films which placed number-one at the weekend box office in Argentina during 2026. Amounts are in American dollars.

== Number-one films ==
#	Weekend end date	Film	Box office	Openings in the top ten	Ref.
1	4 January 2026	Avatar: Fire and Ash	$993,134	-	
2	11 January 2026	Avatar: Fire and Ash	$989,494	Song Sung Blue #4	
3	18 January 2026	Avatar: Fire and Ash	$620,340	-	
4	25 January 2026	Avatar: Fire and Ash	$399,540	-	
5	1 February 2026	Avatar: Fire and Ash	$295,236	Send Help #2	
6	8 February 2026	Stray Kids: The dominATE Experience	$366,000	Greenland 2: Migration #4; Hamnet #5	
7	15 February 2026	Wuthering Heights	$628,594	-	
8	22 February 2026	Avatar: Fire and Ash	$167,325	-	
9	1 March 2026	Avatar: Fire and Ash	$60,901	EPiC: Elvis Presley in Concert #4	
10	8 March 2026	Hoppers	$896,728	Hoppers #1	
11	15 March 2026	Hoppers	$542,080	Reminders of Him #2 Shelter #3 The Testament of Ann Lee #7	
12	22 March 2026	Hoppers	$516,000	Ready or Not 2: Here I Come #2	
13	29 March 2026	Hoppers	$344,000	-	
14	5 April 2026	The Super Mario Galaxy Movie	$2,706,888	The Super Mario Galaxy Movie #1	
15	12 April 2026	The Super Mario Galaxy Movie	$1,106,000	The Drama #2	
16	19 April 2026	The Super Mario Galaxy Movie	$697,457	-	
17	26 April 2026	Michael	$1,488,100	Michael #1	
18	3 May 2026	The Devil Wears Prada 2	$3,398,000	The Devil Wears Prada 2 #1	
19	10 May 2026	The Devil Wears Prada 2	$1,761,000	Mortal Kombat II #2	
20	17 May 2026	The Devil Wears Prada 2	$1,013,000	You, Me and Tuscany #6	
21	24 May 2026	Star Wars: The Mandalorian and Grogu	$824,000	Star Wars: The Mandalorian and Grogu #1	
22	31 May 2026	Backrooms	$937,743	Backrooms #1	
23	7 June 2026	Scary Movie	$1,800,000	Scary Movie #1	
24	14 June 2026	Disclosure Day	$749,211	Disclosure Day #1	
25	21 June 2026	Toy Story 5	$5,392,000	Toy Story 5 #1	
26	28 June 2026	Toy Story 5	$3,148,000	-	
27	5 July 2026	The Devil Wears Prada 2	$2,190,000	Minions and Monsters #2 Tuner #5	
28	12 July 2026	Toy Story 5	$2,620,000	Moana #3	
29	19 July 2026	Toy Story 5	$1,164,000	The Odyssey #2	
30	26 July 2026	Toy Story 5	$1,768,000	-	
31	2 August 2026	Spider-Man: Brand New Day	$10,500,000	Spider-Man: Brand New Day #1	

== Highest-grossing films of 2026 in Argentina ==
Highest-grossing films of 2026 in Argentina (In-year releases)
Rank	Title	Distributor	Domestic gross
1	Toy Story 5	Walt Disney Pictures	$23,458,000
2	Spider-Man: Brand New Day	Sony Pictures Releasing	$10,500,000
3	The Devil Wears Prada 2	Walt Disney Pictures	$9,278,000
4	The Super Mario Galaxy Movie	Universal Pictures	$7,696,172
5	Michael	Universal Pictures	$6,183,844
6	Scary Movie	Paramount Pictures	$5,071,546
7	Hoppers	Walt Disney Pictures	$3,654,000
8	Minions & Monsters	Universal Pictures	$3,472,243
9	Backrooms	Imagem Films	$3,377,637
10	Moana	Walt Disney Pictures	$2,807,000

=== Records ===
- Toy Story 5 became the highest-grossing film in Argentina on June 28th 2026, which only took 10 days since its release. It is also the fifth highest-grossing film in all of Argentinian history.
- Spider-Man: Brand New Day has the biggest weekend box office opening in Argentinian history, with it only taking one weekend to reach $10,500,000.
- The Devil Wears Prada 2 is the only movie in this list to have a sudden surge at the box office on a weekend with an earning of $2,190,000, which could be contributed by the closing of the movie in nearly all cinemas on the same weekend.

== See also ==
- 2026 in Argentina

Preceded by 2025 Box office number-one films	Box office number-one films 2026	Succeeded by 2027 Box office number-one films
