= @Gina Yei: WithAllMyHeartAndMore =

Puerto Rican television series

@Gina Yei: #WithAllMyHeartAndMore
- Spanish: @Gina Yei: #ConTodoElCorazónYMás
- Genre: Comedy drama; Musical
- Composer: Daniel Espinoza
- Country of origin: Puerto Rico
- Original language: Spanish
- No. of seasons: 2
- No. of episodes: 24

Production
- Cinematography: Willie Berrios; Robert Peña
- Editors: Antonella Bosiak; Raúl García; Sarah De Jesús Rodriguez
- Running time: 38–51 minutes
- Production companies: Somos Productions; Piñolywood Studios

Original release
- Network: Disney+
- Release: 11 January 2023
- Network: FlixLatino
- Release: 31 January 2025

@Gina Yei: #WithAllMyHeartAndMore (Spanish: @Gina Yei: #ConTodoElCorazónYMás) is a Puerto Rican comedy-drama television series, produced by Somos Productions and Piñolywood Studios for Disney+. The series premiered worldwide on Disney+ on January 11, 2023. But it was removed from the service on May 26, 2023, as part of Disney's cost-cutting initiative from CEO Bob Iger. Now it exclusively streams on FlixLatino. This deal went into effect on September 30, 2023.(only in Puerto Rico and the US). Season 2 was released on August 4, 2025, in Portugal TV channel SIC K, and in Puerto Rico and the US on January 31, 2026 on FlixLatino.

== Plot ==
Songwriter Gina López, also known as "Gina Yei", has been awarded a scholarship to the renowned Instituto Musical del Caribe (IMC) for her extraordinary talent. This is located on the island nation of Puerto Rico, which is generally considered the cradle of reggaeton. The Instituto Musical del Caribe is considered the best address to expand and perfect one's knowledge in the field of Latin American music and skills in various musical and artistic directions. Gina is beside herself with joy that she gets this chance. She dreams of one day writing songs for aspiring and renowned artists, including Jayden, a highly talented up-and-coming musician as well as the son of the institute's director, and putting her thoughts as well as feelings into her lyrics. However, when she starts at the Instituto Musical del Caribe, she quickly discovers that not everything goes as smoothly as she had imagined. Gina witnesses the great pressure of competition as well as the divide between those who adhere to traditional musical forms and those who want to bring in new nuances. While Gina encounters some obstacles and has to deal with issues such as envy, competition and the pressure of fame, she meets Manu, an ambitious young man with whom she shares her passion for music and for whom she gradually develops more and more feelings. Gina still has a lot to learn, but if she trusts herself more and stays true to her principles, she can manage to realize the dream that has accompanied her for a long time.

== Cast ==
- Didi Romero as Gina López / "Gina Yei"
- Gabriel Tarantini as Manu
- Felipe Albors as Jayden
- Ana Wolfermann as Ruby Rubí
- Angely Serrano as Lucía
- Adriana Fontánez as Vero
- Juliana Rivera as Isa
- Krystal Xamairy as Cami
- Gabriela Santaliz as Miky
- Mía Blakeman Gómez as Amy
- Gerald Manso as El Ángel
- Gustavo Rosas as Dj Noah
- Jacnier Ríos as Luis Diego
- Abdiel Morales as Fabián
- Brian Dean Rittenhouse as Adrián
- José Cancel as Jairo
- José Brocco as Mr. One
- Alfonsina Molinari as Rocío
- Isel Rodríguez as Valentina
- Elí Cay as Salvador
- Wanda Sais as Laura
- Osvaldo Friger as Professor Hansel
- Krystle Ogando as Profesora Cassandra
- Ashley Rivers as Profesora Aurora
- Lumarie Landrau as Mystery D

== Episodes ==
No. overall	No. in season	Title	Directed by	Original release date
1	1	"@GinaYei" "@GinaYei"	Raúl García & Javier Solar	January 11, 2023
2	2	"Welcome to the CMI" "Bienvenida al IMC"	Raúl García & Javier Solar	January 11, 2023
3	3	"All the Heart" "Con todo el corazón"	Raúl García & Javier Solar	January 11, 2023
4	4	"The Great One Fights Back" "El grande contra ataca"	Raúl García & Javier Solar	January 11, 2023
5	5	"Mystery D" "Mystery D"	Raúl García & Javier Solar	January 11, 2023
6	6	"#Rubynumber1" "#Rubynumber1"	Raúl García & Javier Solar	January 11, 2023
7	7	"The Influencer's Show" "El show de los influencers"	Raúl García & Javier Solar	January 11, 2023
8	8	"New Style" "Los nueva onda"	Raúl García & Javier Solar	January 11, 2023
9	9	"The Return" "El regreso"	Raúl García & Javier Solar	January 11, 2023
10	10	"Taking Control" "Tomando el control"	Raúl García & Javier Solar	January 11, 2023
11	11	"We Want to Know" "Queremos saber"	Raúl García & Javier Solar	January 11, 2023
12	12	"I'm Back" "Volví"	Raúl García & Javier Solar	January 11, 2023
