= María Gabriela de Faría =

Venezuelan actress (born 1992)

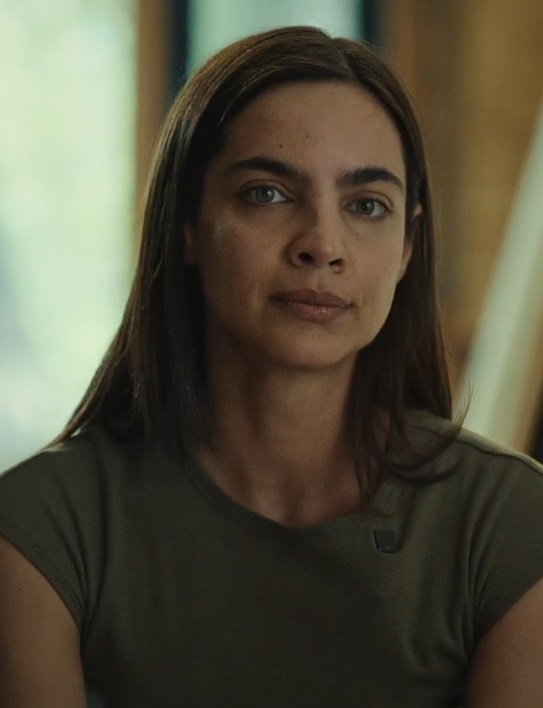
- De Faría in 2024
- Born: 11 September 1992 (age 34); Caracas, Venezuela
- Occupations: Actress, singer
- Years active: 2002–present
- Spouse: Christian McGaffney (m. 2020)
- Website: mariagabrieladefaria.com

María Gabriela de Faría Chacón (born 11 September 1992) is a Venezuelan actress known for her work in South American television series. Appearing most frequently in Nickelodeon shows, de Faria has starred as Isabela "Isa" Pasquali in Isa TKM, as Mia Novoa in Grachi, and as Franky Andrade in Yo soy Franky. In 2019, she starred in Deadly Class as Maria Salazar, and in A Very Moody Christmas as Cora.

In January 2020, de Faría married Venezuelan actor Christian McGaffney. In 2023, she was cast as Angela Spica / The Engineer in the DC Universe franchise.

== Career ==
De Faría began her acting career with the Venezuelan telenovela Ser bonita no basta, the teen drama Túkiti, crecí de una, and the soap opera Toda una dama. In 2007, she was a co-host of the children's program La merienda from RCTV. In 2009, at the age of 17, she became a teen idol for starring as Isabella "Isa" Pasquali in Nickelodeon Latin America's Isa TKM and its sequel Isa TK+, for which she also recorded music.

Her first major film, El paseo 2, with John Leguizamo, was released in December 2012. Her second film (and first in English), was Crossing Point. In 2012, de Faría participated on an album by P9, which was recorded in the United States. In 2013, she appeared in La virgen de la calle as Juana Pérez, with Juan Pablo Llano as Mauricio Vega.

In July 2025, de Faría appeared as Angela Spica / The Engineer, a member of the team The Authority, in the DC Studios film Superman from director James Gunn.

== Filmography ==
=== Film ===
Key
†	Denotes films that have not yet been released

Year	Title	Role	Notes
2003	La señora de Cárdenas	Maria Elena Cárdenas Rodriguez	Television film
2012	El paseo 2	Natalia Calvo	
2016	Crossing Point	Olivia Durán	
2018	Plan V	Fernanda	
2021	The Exorcism of God	Esperanza	
2021	R#J	Nancy	
2024	The Duel	Aphrodite	
2025	Superman	Angela Spica / The Engineer	
2026	Pacifico	Erika	
2027	Man of Tomorrow †	Angela Spica / The Engineer	Post-production

=== Television ===
Year	Title	Role	Notes
2002	Trapos íntimos	María Lobo Andueza	Recurring role
2005	Ser bonita no basta	Andreína Márquez	Recurring role
2006	Túkiti, crecí de una	Wendy	Lead role
2007	Toda una dama	Helena Trujillo Laya	Co-lead role
2008–2009	Isa TKM	Isabella "Isa" Pasquali	Lead role
2009–2010	Isa TK+	Isabella "Isa" Pasquali	Lead role
2011–2013	Grachi	Mia Novoa	Co-lead role
2014	La virgen de la calle	Juana Pérez	Lead role
2015–2016	Yo soy Franky	Franky Andrade	Lead role
2017	Vikki RPM	Francesca Ortíz	Recurring role
2018	Besieged	Zaita	Lead role
2019	Deadly Class	Maria Salazar	Main role
2019–2021	The Moodys	Cora	Guest Starring
2023	Animal Control	Camila	Guest

== Awards and nominations ==
Year	Award Entity	Award	Work	Status
2020	Nickelodeon Kids' Choice Awards USA	Inspiration of the Year	Herself	Nominated
2016	Nickelodeon Kids' Choice Awards USA	Favorite Latin Star	Herself	Nominated
2016	Nickelodeon Kids' Choice Awards Colombia	Favorite Actress	Yo soy Franky	Won
2016	Nickelodeon Kids' Choice Awards Colombia	Favorite Series	Yo soy Franky	Won
2015	Kids' Choice Awards Mexico	Favorite Star	Yo soy Franky	Nominated
2013	Kids' Choice Awards Mexico	Favorite Villain	Grachi	Won
2012	Kids' Choice Awards (Mexico & Arg)	Favorite Villain	Grachi	Nominated
