= Mi familia perfecta =

- Genre: Telenovela
- Created by: José Vicente Spataro
- Written by: Basilio Álvarez; Berenice Cárdenas; Manuel Mendonza; Daniel Rojas
- Directed by: Tony Rodríguez; Ricardo Schwarz; Otto Rodríguez
- Creative director: Evelyn Villegas
- Starring: Jorge Luis Moreno; Sabrina Seara; Gala Montes; Laura Flores; Mauricio Henao; Laura Chimaras; Gabriel Tarantini; Ainhoa Paz
- Theme music composer: Juan Carlos Rodríguez; Las Cafeteras
- Opening theme: "Mi sueño americano" by Las Cafeteras
- Country of origin: United States
- Original languages: Spanish; English
- No. of seasons: 1
- No. of episodes: 69

Production
- Executive producers: José Gerardo Guillén; Jairo Arcila
- Producers: Rafael Villasmil; Jeanette Gómez; Elizabeth Suárez; Orángel Lara
- Production location: Tamaulipas, Mexico
- Cinematography: Rolando Delabat
- Camera setup: Multi-camera
- Production company: Telemundo Global Studios

Original release
- Network: Telemundo
- Release: 9 April – 13 July 2018

Mi familia perfecta is an American Telenovela created by José Vicente Spataro that premiered on Telemundo on 9 April 2018 and concluded on 13 July 2018. The series revolves around of the Guerrero family, a family so united, as dysfunctional, formed by five siblings who were left alone when their father died and their mother was deported.

The series stars Jorge Luis Moreno, Sabrina Seara, and Gala Montes, returning to the network after leaving their mark in the hit Super Series El Señor de los Cielos.

== Plot ==
The series tells the story of Los Guerrero, five siblings struggling to achieve the American dream and get ahead after the death of their father and the deportation of their mother to Mexico. Los Guerrero must demonstrate that they are a very united family to face the different obstacles and situations faced by immigrants in the United States. Dysfunctional but always united, these siblings, El Patas (Jorge Luis Moreno), Rosa (Laura Chimaras), Marisol (Gala Montes), Julián (Gabriel Tarantini) and Lili (Ainhoa Paz), will live the difficult situation of seeing their mother, Irma (Laura Flores), take on the painful decision to leave them in Houston, United States to assure them a better future when she is deported to Mexico. From this moment, the Guerreros will have to support each other to overcome the obstacles of an immigrant family in the United States, achieve the American dream, and at the same time, remain united under one roof. In their struggle, they will have the support of Erika Ramírez (Sabrina Seara), a social worker who takes on the case of these five siblings, and Santiago Vélez (Mauricio Henao), a male soccer coach who discovers Marisol's talent playing soccer. Through her passion for this sport, Marisol will reactivate the faith in her family to continue fighting for her dreams regardless of the obstacles they have to face.

== Cast and characters ==
=== Starring ===
- Jorge Luis Moreno as José María Guerrero, better known as El Patas, a noble and loyal man whose main concern is to take care of his three sisters and younger brother. He always dreamed of being a professional footballer, but at 17 he had to abandon that dream.
  - Emmanuel Pérez as 17-year-old José María Guerrero.
- Sabrina Seara as Erika Ramírez, she is a very serious and correct social worker who seeks justice for unprotected minors.
- Gala Montes as Marisol Guerrero, she was forced to assume the maternal role of her brothers when she was barely 12 and her mother was deported to Mexico. Her main passion is soccer.
- Laura Flores as Irma Solís, she is the mother of the Guerrero siblings.
- Mauricio Henao as Santiago Vélez, he is the son of Amparo and a female soccer coach.
- Laura Chimaras as Rosa Guerrero, a young woman who after the death of her father and the deportation of her mother did not assume the responsibility of becoming the mother figure of her four siblings and grew up feeling that with her beauty she could get everything she wanted.
- Gabriel Tarantini as Julián Guerrero, a nice, roguish and very handsome young man who is a magnet for problems because of his impulsive and immature behavior.
- Ainhoa Paz as Lili Guerrero, she is the youngest of the Guerrero siblings. She is a loving and intelligent girl but in need of affection since she grew up in chaos and with the emotional deficiencies of a dysfunctional family marked by maternal absence.

=== Also starring ===
- Sonya Smith as Dakota Johnson, a woman of scarce resources and little education who feels proud that her family is "redneck". With a dominant and aggressive attitude, she has two daughters Ashley and Tiffany.
- Coraima Torres as Amparo De Vélez, she is the mother of Santiago and Miguel's wife. Amparo is a well-known psychiatrist in Colombia, author of many books.
- Karla Monroig as Camilia Pérez, she is the wife of Tito Pérez. Mother of Eddie and Génesis. Born in Puerto Rico and defender of her Latin roots. She wanted to take care of the Guerrero brothers, when they deported Irma; but this one did not accept it.
- Juan Pablo Shuk as Miguel Ángel Vélez, Santiago's father.
- Natasha Domínguez as Ashley Johnson, Dakota's daughter.
- Daniela Navarro as Antonia Cadenas, she owns a grocery store and Vicente's wife.
- Beatriz Monroy as Francisca Rojas, better known as Panchita, was born in Mexico and was the best friend of Irma's mother.
- Roberto Plantier as Vicente Cadenas, Antonia's husband.
- José Guillermo Cortines as Tito Pérez, he is married to Camila, is the father of Eddie and Génesis.
- Veronica Schneider as Alma Izaguirre the Guerrero's new social worker
- Francisco Rubio as Daniel Mendoza, Irma's lover.
- Rodrigo de la Rosa as Guillermo del Castillo
- Laura Vieira as Andrea Fox, she is the director of the women's soccer club in which Santiago works.
- Estefany Oliveira as Megan Summers, she plays as a defense in the club team that Marisol enters.
- Enrique Montaño as Marcos, Rosa's boyfriend.
- Paulina Matos as Penélope Díaz, she is the front of the football club where Marisol also plays.
- Michelle Taurel as Tiffany Johnson, Dakota's daughter.
- Michelle De Andrade as Génesis Pérez, she is the youngest daughter of Tito and Camila.
- Ana Wolfermann as Sandra Ryan, like Penélope, Sandy leads the team.
- Jerry Rivera Mendoza as Eddie Pérez, he is the eldest son of Tito and Camila.
- Diego Herrera as Maddox Guerrero, Ashley's son.
- Matheo Cruz as Danielito, Irma and Daniel's son

=== Recurring characters ===
- Eduardo Orozco as Felipe, Rosa's boyfriend.
- Ricardo Álamo as Rafael
- Beatriz Valdés as Mireya

== Ratings ==
Viewership and ratings per season of Mi familia perfecta
Season	Timeslot (ET)	Episodes	First aired		Last aired		Avg. viewers (millions)	18–49 rank
Season	Timeslot (ET)	Episodes	Date	Viewers (millions)	Date	Viewers (millions)	Avg. viewers (millions)	18–49 rank
1	Mon–Fri 8pm/7c	69	9 April 2018	1.03	13 July 2018	0.96	0.93	TBD

== Episodes ==
No.	Title	Original release date	US viewers (millions)
1	"El sueño de los Guerrero"	9 April 2018	1.03
The siblings' dream is to bring their mother back to the United States. El Patas, the eldest of the five siblings, works at a food stand to pay for the immigration lawyer.
2	"La mentira"	10 April 2018	0.85
Lili, Julián, and Marisol do not live with Panchita, their tutor and they lie to Erika, the social worker to hide that their older, undocumented brother and sister take care of them. Erika, suspects of them.
3	"Una oportunidad para Marisol"	11 April 2018	0.91
Santiago, convinced of Marisol's talent, is willing to lose his job, if she fails as a soccer player. Patas is forced to tell Erika about the legal status of his family.
4	"Estafan al Patas"	12 April 2018	0.86
José María finds his lawyer's office empty and realizes that the man stole $2000, like many immigrants. Marisol wins the scholarship and must sacrifice herself for her career.
5	"Irma busca a un coyote"	13 April 2018	0.83
Upon learning that her case was a hoax, Irma, desperate, is willing to break the law to meet their children in the United States. The Guerreros find the lawyer who cheated them.
6	"Justicia para los Guerrero"	16 April 2018	0.95
The Guerreros demonstrate with a video, the farce of the swindler and recover the money by their own means. Erika manages to arrest him and recommends El Patas a new lawyer.
7	"Lili cruza sola la frontera"	17 April 2018	1.00
Lili, the youngest of the Guerreros, takes a risk and goes to Mexico by bus. She hides in a car of strangers, to see her mother again. Marisol faints in a soccer practice.
8	"El Patas admira a Erika"	18 April 2018	0.99
El Patas no longer trusts Ashley, when she leaves her son, to get drunk. Instead, Erika offers her support and motivates him to move forward. Rosa does not know that Marcos, her boyfriend, is dangerous.
9	"Marisol y Santiago se gustan"	19 April 2018	0.99
Penelope, a member of the team, accuses Santiago of sexual abuse after trying to seduce him and be rejected. Marisol begins to like the coach and is willing to prove his innocence.
10	"Erika víctima de un escándalo"	20 April 2018	0.80
Ashley raises a scandal to Erika and accuses her of sleeping with her husband, after having seen them together in her car, in the middle of the night.
11	"Santiago se defiende"	23 April 2018	1.02
The coach defends himself before the disciplinary committee of the club, about the complaint of sexual abuse and his relationship with Marisol, beyond the professional. Lili returns with her siblings.
12	"Marisol salva a Santiago"	24 April 2018	0.97
The innocence of the coach is verified before the club committee, when Marisol demonstrates with the security video, that Penelope ripped her own clothes. Marcos forgives Rosa's life.
13	"Erika lucha por los Guerrero"	25 April 2018	0.88
Alma Izaguirre, the new social worker, appears with the Guerrero and recommends separating the family, due to so many irregularities. Erika begs her to reconsider the situation. Tito is killed.
14	"Marisol celosa por Santiago"	27 April 2018	0.84
Lina, the former lover of Santiago, comes to see him at the club. Marisol is intrigued to know who the mysterious woman is. Ashley learns that El Patas saw Erika again and explodes with fury.
15	"Ashley causa daño a Erika"	30 April 2018	0.91
Julian discovers that Ashley is the intellectual author of the attack; she threatens to denounce El Patas before immigration and take his son. Marisol faces Santiago because of Lina.
16	"Marisol gana su primer partido"	1 May 2018	0.86
The Guerrero celebrate the victory of Marisol, when she manages to score a goal, so that her team triumphs. Erika enjoys El Patas. Ashley takes drugs and does not remember where she left her son, Maddox.
17	"El Patas se queda con su hijo"	2 May 2018	1.03
José María infuriates and does not forgive Ashley, for leaving their son, Maddox in an alley with prostitutes and for messing with Erika. He gives her an ultimatum. Marisol dreams of a family with Santiago.
18	"La traición de Ashley"	3 May 2018	0.90
Julian and TJ are detained at the youth center, Ashley takes advantage of the situation and gives Alma enough reasons, to separate the Guerrero and take Erika out of their way. Marcos threatens Rosa.
19	"El Patas se refugia en Erika"	4 May 2018	0.81
The Social Service takes Marisol, Lili, and Julián to different care centers. José María, desperate, goes to Erika's house and both are carried away by their feelings.
20	"El Patas ya no ama a Ashley"	7 May 2018	0.90
El Patas kicks Ashley out of the house and his life, because she is the cause of the separation of his siblings. To save the relationship, she goes to a rehabilitation center. Santiago mediates by Marisol.
21	"José María comparece"	8 May 2018	0.91
Francisca does not appear at the first hearing about the Guerrero case. El Patas arrives at the court and faces for Marisol and Julián, before the judge.
22	"La valentía de Marisol"	9 May 2018	0.82
A guard at the youth center tries to rape Marisol and she defends herself with guts. She asks Erika for help, to prove her innocence. El Patas confesses that he feels something for Erika.
23	"Los gemelos regresan a casa"	10 May 2018	0.95
The guard who tried to rape Marisol is arrested, with the help of Erika and Alma. Julián and Marisol turn 18 and are legally free to leave the group home and return home.
24	"Ashley contra los Guerrero"	11 May 2018	0.85
Ashley decides to take the Guerrero's food truck business, convinced that it is hers, for being the mother of Maddox. Irma, with the approved visa, seeks permission for Danielito.
25	"Irma sorprende a sus hijos"	14 May 2018	0.87
After 6 years, Irma, the siblings mother legally returns to the United States, and surprises her children when she appears on their doorstep. Erika and Ashley have a strong confrontation.
26	"Los Guerrero sospechan de Irma"	15 May 2018	0.88
Because of Panchita, Russians kidnap Danielito and Irma must rescue him, without saying anything to her children. However, her sudden disappearance leaves them restless. Marisol faces Amparo, Santiago's mother.
27	"José María celoso por Erika"	16 May 2018	0.95
Reynaldo, Irma's lawyer invites Erika to eat, after winning custody of Lili. José María cannot bear to see her with another man and goes to her house. Marisol receives bad news.
28	"El Patas y Erika hacen el amor"	17 May 2018	0.94
José María and Erika declare their love and fall into temptation. Ashley senses that they spent the night together and is not willing to lose her man. The Guerrero receive an eviction order.
29	"El Patas decide dejar a Ashley"	18 May 2018	0.86
Ashley sends a photomontage to Erika. José María decides to leave the mother of his son and defend his new love. Marisol works in the club cafeteria, to pay part of her scholarship.
30	"Atropellan a Erika"	21 May 2018	0.91
José María breaks up with Ashley and she leaves the house threatening him, taking Maddox away. She convinces her friend Johnny to run over Erika with his car.
31	"El Patas quiere venganza"	22 May 2018	1.04
José María looks for Ashley to pay for running over Erika, when she realizes that her friend, Johnny, was the one who caused the tragedy. Megan offers Marisol steroids, to be more competitive.
32	"Acusan a Marisol"	23 May 2018	0.98
Andrea receives information that Marisol has prohibited substances hidden in her locker, and forces her to do an anti-doping test. Alma learns that El Patas wants to donate a kidney to Erika.
33	"El Patas da la vida por Erika"	24 May 2018	0.86
Erika is between life and death; her only outlet is a new kidney. José María decides to donate his, to save the woman he loves. They choose Marisol for the tournament, in Miami.
34	"Ashley desata una guerra"	25 May 2018	0.83
Jose Maria's surgery is complicated and Ashley's fury explodes, upon discovering that he donated a kidney to Erika. She promises to get revenge, and begins by claiming the food truck from the Guerreros.
35	"José María vive una pesadilla"	28 May 2018	0.94
Ashley takes revenge and takes the food truck from the Guerreros. With the money from the sale she takes with Maddox, leaving no trace behind. Marisol is injured in the first game of the tournament.
36	"Marisol y Santiago se aman"	29 May 2018	1.00
Santiago invites Marisol to spend a wonderful day, sailing in the sea and they are carried away by their feelings, without anyone judging them. Rosa discovers that her new love is married.
37	"Señalan a Irma de robo"	30 May 2018	0.98
Amparo points out Irma to be the only one who has the keys to her house in front of the police, after Julián and Eddie robbed the house of Santiago's parents. El Patas learns that his son has disappeared.
38	"Graban a Marisol y Santiago"	31 May 2018	1.00
At Andrea's request, Sandy spies on Marisol and records when Marisol and the coach kiss each other, putting their careers at risk. Patas has news of Ashley and hir son.
39	"José María exige respuestas"	1 June 2018	0.82
El Patas is restless, after Amparo sows more questions, about the relationship that Marisol has with Santiago. Irma's husband appears at the Guerrero's house .
40	"Rosa sufre por Miguel Ángel"	4 June 2018	1.00
Feeling humiliated again, Rosa makes the mistake and goes to bed with Vicente, after seeing Miguel Ángel in bed with his wife. Santiago and Marisol confess to El Patas that they love each other.
41	"El Patas da con Ashley"	5 June 2018	1.13
Erika and José María go to Kansas, to recover Maddox. They see Ashley next to a stranger, taking drugs and the man cannons, when they get into the house. Rosa and Miguel Ángel are discovered.
42	"Amenazan a la familia Guerrero"	6 June 2018	0.89
Upon learning that Maddox is at the Guerrero home, Dakota arrives with her friends from the biker gang, to demand that they return her grandson or pay the consequences.
43	"Irma da la cara a sus hijos"	7 June 2018	0.92
After Daniel appears in surprise, with Danielito, Irma is forced to confront her children and reveal that they have another little brother.
44	"Rosa se escapa con Mickey"	8 June 2018	0.92
A clash broke out between Santiago and Marisol's family, upon discovering that Rosa ran away with a married man, regardless of the damage they cause. José María has competition.
45	"Descubren a Marisol y Santiago"	11 June 2018	1.10
Andrea finds Marisol kissing with her coach in her office and pressures her to give up football. Jose Maria prevents Ashley from taking her son and puts a civil lawsuit against her.
46	"Rosa está embarazada"	12 June 2018	1.01
When enjoying life in Miami and losing track of time, Rosa gives the news to Miguel Ángel, that she is pregnant with his son, leaving him speechless. Marisol breaks her relationship with Santiago.
47	"Acusan a Rosa de farsante"	13 June 2018	0.88
A vasectomy rules out the possibility that Miguel Ángel is the father of the child Rosa waits for. The Guerrero celebrate Marisol's graduation. Guillermo provokes José María.
48	"El Patas pelea por su hijo"	14 June 2018	0.89
José María confronts Ashley in front of a judge and she loses control, when he exposes her, as a bad mother. Rosa thinks about aborting the baby. Guillermo shows his true face.
49	"Santiago descubre la verdad"	15 June 2018	0.81
Santiago learns that Marisol works in the street, because Andrea took her out of the club under threats and plans a plan, to reincorporate her. Rosa is offered as a belly for rent with Vicente.
50	"Erika bajo la lupa"	18 June 2018	1.01
Alma testifies that Erika manipulated information, to favor the family of José María, for being her lover and this unleashes a racial confrontation. Santiago achieves his goal.
51	"Erika se enfrenta con Ashley"	19 June 2018	0.97
Ashley, upset and under the influence of alcohol, arrives at Erika's apartment and finds José María with her son. Marisol rejoins the soccer team and Santiago is happy.
52	"Despiden a Erika del trabajo"	20 June 2018	0.96
El Patas explodes with jealousy, when Guillermo offers employment to Erika in Chicago. José María proposes that she lives with him. In court, it is clear that Maddox prefers to be with his father.
53	"El Patas gana la custodia"	21 June 2018	1.03
The judge grants custody of Maddox to El Patas, without denying rights to Ashley, as a mother. If she overcomes her addictions, she could ask for a review of the case. Santiago faces for Marisol.
54	"José María vuelve al fútbol"	22 June 2018	0.77
The board of directors accepts José María, as assistant in the children's team, on the recommendation of Santiago. Patas moves in with Erika. Dakota convinces Ashley, to kidnap Maddox.
55	"Marisol pelea por lo suyo"	25 June 2018	0.97
Santiago accepts that Lina, his ex, stays in his apartment. Marisol does not give up spaces. She decides to move with her boyfriend, putting conditions on her rival. Julian and TJ escape together.
56	"El Patas saca su lado oscuro"	26 June 2018	0.89
José María is carried away by jealousy and loses control, upon learning that Guillermo made another offer to Erika, as his assistant. Rosa is beaten, and Antonia insists that she live in her house.
57	"Secuestran a José María"	27 June 2018	0.98
Dakota and Derick kidnap José María and plan to disappear him, leaving no trace. Thus, custody of the child would pass to Ashley. Lina plans to ruin the relationship of Santiago and Marisol.
58	"Ashley cobra venganza"	28 June 2018	0.90
José María fights for his life and faces gunpoint with Dakota. In an oversight, he takes her hostage and Ashley arrives to pull the trigger. The Guerrero believe that El Patas fell prisoner.
59	"Ashley se pone en evidencia"	29 June 2018	0.89
Sure that José Maria will not return, Ashley goes to the house of the Guerrero, so that they return her son. She raises suspicion before everyone, to be so anxious to recover her son. Santiago is threaten.
60	"El Patas está en coma"	2 July 2018	0.89
They take José María to an emergency center. Due to lack of resources, they decide to transfer him to a hospital, where he runs the risk of being deported. The Guerrero discover Ashley and Dakota.
61	"Los Guerrero van por Maddox"	3 July 2018	0.92
Dakota takes Julián as hostage when he arrives at her house, with Marisol, Santiago and the police to recover Maddox and guarantee his safety. Erika finds José María, in recovery.
62	"Ashley da la vida por su hijo"	4 July 2018	0.78
Dakota forces her daughter to flee with Maddox, but Ashley, surprisingly, hides the boy and points to his mother. Seeing her threatened, they hit a deadly shot to the ex of El Patas.
63	"Despiden a Santiago del club"	5 July 2018	0.87
Andrea, tired of so much rejection, starts her revenge and agrees to ally with the man who destroyed the career of Santiago. José María watches the video that Ashley left him before her death.
64	"Marisol y Santiago dan la cara"	6 July 2018	0.90
Marisol and Santiago will no longer have to hide their love and defends their relationship when Andrea shows a recording of her cell phone, in which Santiago admits his relationship with Marisol. El Patas receives news.
65	"Arrestan a Julián por fraude"	9 July 2018	0.82
Julián uses a stolen card again, in a clothing store, but the owner recognizes him by a photograph and they take him prisoner. With the help of Lina and Amparo, Santiago manages to clear his name.
66	"Dakota va por los Guerrero"	10 July 2018	0.96
Daniel pays the consequences, for being part of the Guerrero family, when Dakota and two of her men, throw him off a bridge. Santiago returns to the club. Julian meets TJ and Ashley's father.
67	"Eddie traiciona a Marisol"	11 July 2018	1.02
Eddie, hooded, tries to break Marisol's legs, to prevent her from showing up for the club's tests; but she manages to defend herself and discovers him. TJ's father saves Julian.
68	"Dakota le dispara a José María"	12 July 2018	1.03
Before Dakota returns to kill in cold blood, José María and TJ collaborate with the authorities, to capture her. In an encounter with her, El Patas collapses, product of a bullet impact.
69	"Erika y José María se casan"	13 July 2018	0.96
After overcoming multiple obstacles, El Patas and Erika decide to continue their celebration, supporting Marisol in her first professional soccer game.

== Awards and nominations ==
Year	Award	Category	Nominated	Result
2019	GLAAD Media Award	Outstanding Scripted Television Series (Spanish-Language)	Mi familia perfecta	Nominated
