= List of 2023 box office number-one films in Argentina =

This is a list of films which placed number-one at the weekend box office in Argentina during 2023. Amounts are in American dollars.

== Number-one films ==
†	This implies the highest-grossing movie of the year.

#	Weekend end date	Film	Box office	Openings in the top ten	Ref.
1	8 January 2023	Avatar: The Way of Water	$1,651,290	Puss in Boots: The Last Wish #2	
2	15 January 2023	Avatar: The Way of Water	$1,311,182		
3	22 January 2023	Avatar: The Way of Water	$968,690	M3GAN #3	
4	29 January 2023	Puss in Boots: The Last Wish	$810,048	The Fabelmans #4	
5	5 February 2023	Puss in Boots: The Last Wish	$628,680	Knock at the Cabin #4; The Banshees of Inisherin #5	
6	12 February 2023	Puss in Boots: The Last Wish	$414,537	Titanic #3; Tár #6	
7	19 February 2023	Ant-Man and the Wasp: Quantumania	$1,669,985		
8	26 February 2023	Ant-Man and the Wasp: Quantumania	$528,420	Empire of Light #5	
9	5 March 2023	Ant-Man and the Wasp: Quantumania	$276,214		
10	12 March 2023	Scream VI	$385,000	Women Talking #6	
11	19 March 2023	The Whale	$184,568		
12	26 March 2023	John Wick: Chapter 4	$796,591	Cocaine Bear #3	
13	2 April 2023	John Wick: Chapter 4	$442,758		
14	9 April 2023	The Super Mario Bros. Movie	$3,323,320		
15	16 April 2023	The Super Mario Bros. Movie	$1,925,399		
16	23 April 2023	The Super Mario Bros. Movie	$1,468,764	Evil Dead Rise #2; Renfield #3	
17	30 April 2023	The Super Mario Bros. Movie	$1,260,782	Lifemark #5	
18	7 May 2023	Guardians of the Galaxy Vol. 3	$2,336,626		
19	14 May 2023	Guardians of the Galaxy Vol. 3	$1,408,020	Book Club: The Next Chapter #3	
20	21 May 2023	Fast X	$5,354,369		
21	28 May 2023	Fast X	$2,830,450	The Little Mermaid #2	
22	4 June 2023	The Little Mermaid	$1,102,591	The Boogeyman #4; About My Father #6	
23	11 June 2023	The Little Mermaid	$705,688		
24	18 June 2023	Elemental	$1,017,586		
25	25 June 2023	Elemental	$912,388		
26	2 July 2023	Elemental	$736,419	Indiana Jones and the Dial of Destiny #2; Ruby Gillman, Teenage Kraken #3	
27	9 July 2023	Elemental	$728,513		
28	16 July 2023	Elemental	$1,002,530		
29	23 July 2023	Barbie †	$4,600,000	Oppenheimer #3	
30	30 July 2023	Elemental	$987,436	Haunted Mansion #3; Joy Ride #9	
31	6 August 2023	Oppenheimer	$679,673		
32	13 August 2023	Oppenheimer	$448,032	Asteroid City #3	
33	20 August 2023	Oppenheimer	$276,396		
34	27 August 2023	Oppenheimer	$162,822	The Last Voyage of the Demeter #2	
35	3 September 2023	Oppenheimer	$110,952		
36	10 September 2023	The Nun II	$1,800,000		
37	17 September 2023	A Haunting in Venice	$170,614		
38	24 September 2023	A Haunting in Venice	$116,812		
39	1 October 2023	Saw X	$298,245	The Creator #2	
40	8 October 2023	The Exorcist: Believer	$531,310		
41	15 October 2023	The Exorcist: Believer	$341,615		
42	22 October 2023	The Exorcist: Believer	$191,254		
43	29 October 2023	Five Nights at Freddy's	$2,379,800	Trolls Band Together #2	
44	5 November 2023	Five Nights at Freddy's	$1,013,395		
45	12 November 2023	The Marvels	$664,732		
46	19 November 2023	The Hunger Games: The Ballad of Songbirds & Snakes	$849,225		
47	26 November 2023	Five Nights at Freddy's	$141,666		
48	3 December 2023	Five Nights at Freddy's	$116,678		
49	10 December 2023	The Hunger Games: The Ballad of Songbirds & Snakes	$98,008		
50	17 December 2023	Trolls Band Together	$10,672		
51	24 December 2023	Trolls Band Together	$3,016		
52	31 December 2023	Trolls Band Together	$5,387		

== Highest-grossing films ==
Highest-grossing films of 2023 (In-year releases)
Rank	Title	Distributor	Domestic gross
1	Barbie	Warner Bros.	$15,500,000
2	The Super Mario Bros. Movie	Universal Pictures	$14,204,293
3	Fast X	Universal Pictures	$12,728,101
4	Elemental	Walt Disney Pictures	$11,757,891
5	Puss in Boots: The Last Wish	Universal Pictures	$10,532,853
6	Guardians of the Galaxy Vol. 3	Walt Disney Pictures	$6,752,616
7	The Little Mermaid	Walt Disney Pictures	$6,457,801
8	Five Nights at Freddy's	Universal Pictures	$5,828,320
9	The Nun II	Warner Bros.	$5,300,000
10	Oppenheimer	Universal Pictures	$4,989,616

== See also ==
- 2023 in Argentina

Preceded by 2022 Box office number-one films	Box office number-one films 2023	Succeeded by 2024 Box office number-one films
