= Gonzalo (The Tempest) =

Character in The Tempest

Gonzalo (/ˈɡɒnzəloʊ/ GON-zə-loh) is a fictional character in William Shakespeare's The Tempest.

An honest and trusted adviser to King Alonso of Naples, he has a good heart and an optimistic outlook, and is described as noble. For example, when Prospero and his daughter, Miranda, were set adrift at sea, Gonzalo took pity on them, supplying them not only with the food and water necessary to survive but also with those things that make life easier. In addition, Gonzalo is the only character able to see Caliban as more than a demonic beast. Gonzalo first arrives on Prospero's island with Alonso, Ferdinand, Sebastian, Antonio, Stephano, and Trinculo during a storm while returning from the wedding of Alonso’s daughter. During their time on the island, Gonzalo repeatedly attempts to lighten the mood by discussing the beauty of the island. An old, honest lord, he speaks cheerfully of the miracle of the reconciliation of the lords. Some critics see Gonzalo as the mouthpiece of the play, who mirrors Shakespeare's relativist beliefs. The role has been played by many actors.

== Gonzalo, Prospero, and Miranda ==
Gonzalo was a nobleman from Naples. He had been chosen to carry out the plan to carry Prospero and Miranda to the sea and kill them there. However, instead of killing them, he gave them clothes, linen, and other necessities. Knowing how much Prospero cherished his books, he arranged for books from Prospero's library to be saved and available on the island.

=== Characters' Quotes about Gonzalo ===
PROSPERO: [Gonzalo] had given us out of the kindness of his heart.

MIRANDA: I wish I could see that man [Gonzalo] someday!.
