= Isa TKM =

2008–09 season of Venezuelan television series

- Also known as: Isa TK+ (season 2)
- Genre: Teen comedy telenovela
- Created by: Mariela Romero
- Starring: María Gabriela de Faría; Reinaldo Zavarce; Milena Torres; Micaela Castellotti; Willy Martin
- Opening theme: "Ven a Bailar" performed by Isa TKM
- Ending theme: "Ven a Bailar" performed by Isa TKM
- Country of origin: Venezuela
- Original language: Spanish
- No. of seasons: 1
- No. of episodes: 105

Production
- Executive producer: José Vicente Scheuren
- Producer: David Freytes
- Production locations: Caracas, Venezuela
- Running time: 42–43 minutes
- Production companies: Nickelodeon Latin America; Sony Pictures Television; Cinemateriales (Cinemat Inc.)

Original release
- Network: Nickelodeon Latin America
- Release: 29 September 2008 – 20 March 2009

Related
- Isa TK+ (season 2)

Isa TKM (Isa, te kiero mucho [sic]) is a Venezuelan teen comedy telenovela created by Mariela Romero, which aired on Nickelodeon Latin America from September 29, 2008 to March 20, 2009. It was co-produced in Caracas by Nickelodeon Latin America, Sony Pictures Television, and Cinemat. It was Nickelodeon Latin America's second original production in the region, following Skimo (Mexico). Its sequel, Isa TK+ (Isa, te kiero más [sic]), was filmed in Colombia.

The story follows Isabella "Isa" Pasquali (María Gabriela de Faría), a teenage girl who faces various challenges in her personal life, related to her first love, her first romantic kiss, school rivalries, and the late discovery of her true origins when she learns she is adopted. As the plot develops, Isa begins to pursue a music career, which leads her adventures to take place in a performing arts school during the second season.

Isa TKM achieved great popularity across Latin American countries and is considered Nickelodeon Latin America's first major original success, often compared to other international teen phenomena such as High School Musical.

== Plot ==
Isa TKM cast (from L:R) Willy Martin as Rey Galán, Micaela Castelotti as Linda Luna, Maria Gabriela de Faria as Isa Pasquali, Reinaldo Zavarce as Alex Ruiz and Milena Torres as Cristina Ricalde.

The show revolves around Isabella "Isa" Pasquali, a 15-year-old girl. Her dream is to gain the affection of Alejandro "Alex" Ruiz, but this proves to be a challenge, since her rival Cristina Ricalde has caught Alex's eye first.

Isa's best friend is Linda Luna, who has the same dilemma that Isa has: she's in love with a boy named Reinaldo "Rey" Galán, who also has a crush on Cristina. Alex and Rey are rivals, competing against each other in a band contest.

Rebeca Ricalde, Cristina's sister, is the rival of Marina Pasquali, Isa's sister. Marina is engaged to Cristóbal Silva, whom both Rebeca and Marina have fallen in love with. Rebecca has some advantage, since Cristóbal's mother, Lucrecia Portocarreros, supports her with selfish intentions. Cristóbal's brother Micky is Alex's best friend and plays the bass in Alex's band. His girlfriend Vanessa is a friend of Cristina.

Alex's mother, Estela, is in love with her boss Julio Silva, but he is still in love with Jennifer Contreras, with whom he had a daughter when they were both teenagers. Isa's parents, Antonio and Carmina Pasquali, are owners of a pizza shop that is located outside of the building where many of the characters live. Eventually, Isa becomes Alex's girlfriend. She discovers that she is adopted and that her biological parents are Julio and Jennifer. Initially, Isa does not accept her biological parents, but ends up loving them.

At the end of the series, Cristina becomes friendly with everyone and tries to reconcile with them. Linda and Rey become a couple, and Marina begins a romance with one of Isa's producers, Raul Clavati. Isa and Alex have their first kiss in the last episode, after several failed attempts throughout the series.

== Episodes ==
Season	Episodes	First Airdate	Last Airdate
1	105	Latin America: September 29, 2008; United States: June 22, 2009	Latin America: March 20, 2009; United States: November 13, 2009

== See also ==
- Isa TK+
- Skimo
- Sueña conmigo
