= Ricardo Abarca =

Mexican actor and singer

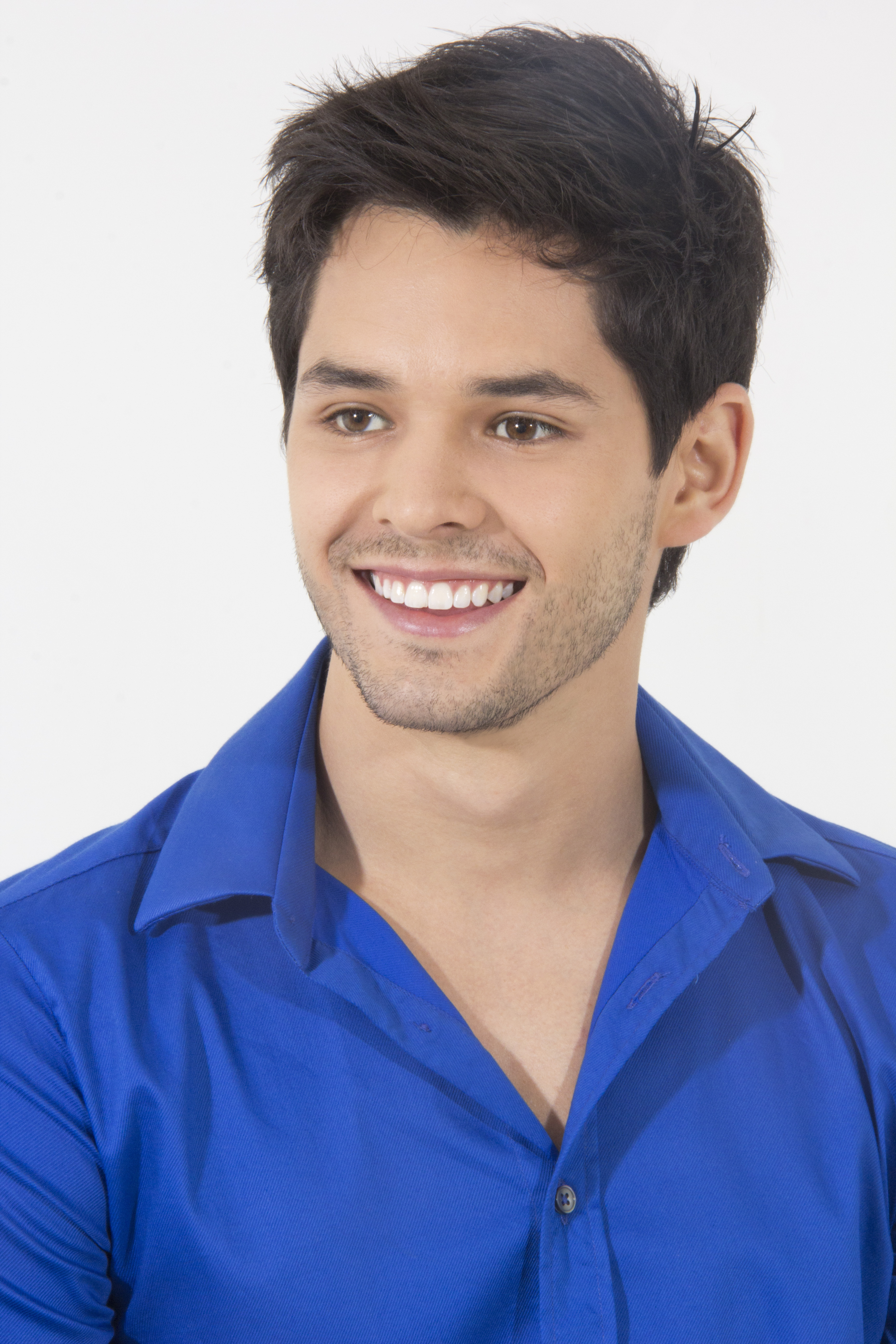
- Born: Ricardo Guillermo Abarca Lowman; June 1, 1986 (age 40); Morelia, Michoacán, Mexico
- Occupations: Actor, singer
- Years active: 2005-present
- Spouse: Diana Neira (m. 2011)
- Children: 1

Ricardo Guillermo Abarca Lowman (born June 1, 1986) is a Mexican actor and singer.

Born to Ricardo Abarca Medina of Mexico and Yasmine Cheyenne Lowman, a London-born Englishwoman, Ricardo Abarca began his career as a member of the teenage Mexican boy band M5 with whom he released five albums from 2002 through 2009. After a special appearance in the popular telenovela Rebelde, Abarca obtained his first character role in Amores de mercado.

== Early years ==
In 2002, Abarca suffered an accident when he exited a helicopter and waved good-bye to fans. Doctors spent 12 hours reattaching his fingers that had been cut off, thanks to fans who had voluntarily searched for and located them, throughout the field, where the accident had occurred.

== Filmography ==
=== Film ===
Year	Title	Role	Notes
2016	Pacífico	Mateo	Debut film
2016	¿Qué culpa tiene el niño?	Renato	
2019	Miss Bala	Pollo	
2019	Chicuarotes	Planchado	

=== Television ===
Year	Title	Role	Notes
2006	Amores de mercado	Adrián Leira	
2007	Victoria	Santiago Mendoza	
2007	Cane	Rick	2 episodes
2008–2009	Un gancho al corazón	Aldo Hernández	Recurring role; 13 episodes
2009–2010	Isa TK+	Sebastían Lorenzo	Recurring role
2010	Ojo por ojo	Gustavo	
2011	Popland!	Diego Mesan	Recurring role; 70 episodes
2013–2015	Cumbia Ninja	Hache / Sebastián Acuña	Lead role; 45 episodes
2016–2017	Silvana sin lana	Vicente Gallardo	Also starring; 113 episodes
2017	Run Coyote Run	Bombarderito	Episode: "Sin límite de tiempo"
2018	Sitiados	Diego	
2022	Repatriated	Leonel Reina	

== Awards and nominations ==
Year	Award	Category	Works	Result
2017	Your World Awards	Favorite Actor	Silvana sin lana	Nominated
