= Andrés Gómez (field hockey) =

Spanish field hockey player (born 1962)

Andrés Gómez (born 12 August 1962) is a Spanish former field hockey player who competed in the 1984 Summer Olympics and in the 1988 Summer Olympics.
