= The Exorcism of God =

- Theatrical release poster
- Directed by: Alexandra Hidalgo
- Written by: Alejandro Hidalgo; Santiago Fernández Calvete
- Produced by: Joel Seidl; Antonio Abdo; Alexander Da Silva; Santiago Fernández Calvete; Alvaro Gonzalez Kuhn; Srdjan Stakic
- Starring: Will Beinbrink; María Gabriela de Faría; Joseph Marcell
- Cinematography: Gerard Uzcategui
- Edited by: Dester Linares; Rodrigo Ríos
- Music by: Elik Alvarez; Yoncarlos Medina
- Production companies: Epica Pictures; Mouth of the Devil; Terminal
- Distributed by: Saban Films
- Release dates: September 27, 2021 (Fantastic Fest); March 11, 2022 (United States)
- Running time: 98 minutes
- Countries: United States; Mexico; Venezuela
- Language: English
- Budget: $1.3 million
- Box office: $6.1 million

The Exorcism of God is a 2021 supernatural horror film directed and co-written by Alejandro Hidalgo and starring Will Beinbrink, María Gabriela de Faría, and Joseph Marcell.

== Plot ==
In 2003, Father Peter Williams, an American priest serving in Mexico, is called to perform an exorcism on a young woman named Magali Velasquez. During the ritual, Peter appears to lose control, and the demon momentarily overpowers him. However, the full extent of what transpired is left ambiguous. Despite this, Peter continues his priesthood, dedicating himself to charitable work in a small Mexican town.

Eighteen years later, supernatural disturbances begin to unfold. A deadly illness spreads among the town's children, and a young woman named Esperanza, incarcerated in a local prison, begins exhibiting violent signs of demonic possession. Peter is called to perform an exorcism, but the encounter unsettles him. His past seems to be catching up with him. Shortly after, Magali informs Peter that Esperanza is her biological daughter, and she urges him to save her at all costs.

Recognizing that he cannot handle the situation alone, Peter seeks assistance from Father Michael Lewis, an experienced exorcist. As they prepare to perform the ritual, they discover that the demon's influence has already spread, possessing multiple inmates inside the prison. The priests are overpowered and forced to lock themselves in a room. During their desperate attempt to regain control, Father Lewis questions why Peter's prayers seem ineffective and whether he is harboring any sins. Peter confesses that during the failed exorcism eighteen years ago, he was not only possessed but was seduced by the demon inhabiting Magali. Under its influence, he engaged in intercourse with her, leading to Esperanza's birth. The realization shakes Father Lewis, who then admits his own dark secret—he never actually defeated the demon Balban in the past but instead made a deal with it.

Before Father Lewis can do more, he is fatally wounded by one of the possessed inmates. With his dying breath, he warns Peter to never make a deal with Balban. Determined to atone for his past sins, Peter records a video confession and sends it to the Church authorities, hoping to absolve himself. However, before he can act further, the possessed inmates attack him, knocking him unconscious.

Peter awakens to find himself restrained, surrounded by the possessed inmates and Esperanza, now fully under Balban's control. The demon and its followers begin a ritual intended to sever Peter's connection with God. As he attempts to exorcise the demon from Esperanza, Balban forces him to witness children in the church dying one by one as a consequence of his resistance. The demon then presents Peter with a devastating choice: he can either save the children, save his daughter, or relinquish his divine connection.

Peter ultimately chooses to renounce his faith, allowing himself to be possessed by Balban. As the demon takes full control, it declares victory. Now in a fully possessed state, Peter is last seen wearing a twisted, demonic grin, his soul seemingly lost.

== Cast ==
- Will Beinbrink as Father Peter Williams
- María Gabriela de Faría as Esperanza
- Joseph Marcell as Father Michael Lewis
- Irán Castillo as Magali
- Evelia Di Gennaro as Sister Camila
- Hector Kotsifakis as Dr. Nelson
- Alfredo Herrera as Possessed Jesus
- Nuria Gil as Reporter

== Release ==
The Exorcism of God premiered at Fantastic Fest on September 27, 2021. That same day, Saban Films finalized a deal to distribute the film in the United States, Australia, New Zealand, United Kingdom, Ireland, and South Africa. Saban Films released the film concurrently in theaters, on demand, and digital on March 11, 2022.

=== Critical response ===
On Rotten Tomatoes, the film has an approval rating of 57% based on 14 reviews, with an average rating of 5.10/10. On Metacritic, the film has a weighted average score of 41 out of 100, based on 5 critics, indicating "mixed or average" reviews.

Meagan Navarro of Bloody Disgusting praised some of the creative scares but felt that the film relies on the genre's tropes and that the lead character was flat with no growth. Tracy Palmer of Signal Horizon found herself "freaked out, grossed out, and laughing" after her screening. She praised the film's jump-scares, gleeful violence, and design and disturbing imagery of the film's demons, as well as the film's "thought-out and fast-paced" plot, concluding that the film is a "fun movie full of lasting imagery and just enough cheese with the gore to make it palatable."

Justine Smith of RogerEbert.com awarded the film two and a half stars out of four, also noting the "aesthetic and narrative" cliches of the genre, but praised the film's plot and characters as "thought-out and progress logically" and the film's sufficient originality to distinguish it from similar films. Phil Hoad of The Guardian awarded the film three stars out of five, stating that the film is "bombastic but occasionally surprising." He also noted the film falling back on tired tropes and "daft" horror mechanics and concluded by calling the film a "big, gaudy, overblown altarpiece of a horror movie."
