= List of 2021 box office number-one films in Argentina =

This is a list of films which placed number-one at the weekend box office in Argentina during 2021. Amounts are in American dollars.

== Number-one films ==
†	This implies the highest-grossing movie of the year.

#	Weekend end date	Film	Box office	Openings in the top ten
1	3 January 2021	The Invisible Man	$112	
2	10 January 2021	The Empty Man	$2,119	
3	17 January 2021	The Empty Man	$3,949	
4	24 January 2021	The Empty Man	$1,455	
5	31 January 2021	The Empty Man	$1,465	
6	7 February 2021	The Empty Man	$1,533	
7	14 February 2021	Trolls World Tour	$8,022	
8	21 February 2021	The Empty Man	$1,080	
9	28 February 2021	Trolls World Tour	$3,844	
10	7 March 2021	Raya and the Last Dragon	$35,808	
11	14 March 2021	Raya and the Last Dragon	$44,723	
12	21 March 2021	Raya and the Last Dragon	$52,033	
13	28 March 2021	Raya and the Last Dragon	$50,111	
14	4 April 2021	Raya and the Last Dragon	$47,973	The New Mutants (#2)
15	11 April 2021	Raya and the Last Dragon	$38,875	
16	18 April 2021	Raya and the Last Dragon	$13,597	
17	25 April 2021	Raya and the Last Dragon	$8,381	
18	2 May 2021	Raya and the Last Dragon	$4,557	
19	9 May 2021	Trolls World Tour	$327	
20	16 May 2021	Raya and the Last Dragon	$2,886	
21	23 May 2021	Raya and the Last Dragon	$1,770	
22	30 May 2021	Cruella	$7,294	
23	6 June 2021	Cruella	$19,972	
24	13 June 2021	Cruella	$16,616	
25	20 June 2021	Cruella	$60,343	
26	27 June 2021	F9	$137,000	
27	4 July 2021	The Croods: A New Age	$164,000	Nobody (#3)
28	11 July 2021	Black Widow †	$583,515	
29	18 July 2021	Space Jam: A New Legacy	$356,000	The Forever Purge (#2)

== Highest-grossing films ==
Highest-grossing films of 2021
Rank	Title	Distributor	Domestic gross
1	Black Widow	Disney	$583,515
2	Raya and the Last Dragon	Disney	$426,288
3	Cruella	Disney	$392,718
4	Space Jam: A New Legacy	Warner Bros.	$356,000
5	The Forever Purge	Universal	$197,000
6	The Croods: A New Age	Universal	$164,000
7	F9	Universal	$137,000
8	Trolls World Tour	United International	$119,135
9	The New Mutants	Disney	$107,735
10	The Empty Man	Disney	$62,335
