= David Freytes =

Venezuelan film actor and director

- Born: David Leonardo Freytes Gasperi; January 30, 1989 (age 37); Caracas, Venezuela
- Occupations: Actor, Film director, Screenwriter, Film producer
- Years active: 2011–present

David Leonardo Freytes Gasperi (Caracas, Venezuela, January 30, 1989) is a Venezuelan film director, screenwriter, producer and actor.

== Biography ==
He is a journalist, graduated in 2011 that also attended a Master in Cinema and Television Direction in Barcelona (Spain) at Ramon Llul university (A.y.2011-2012). During the master course, he produced and directed two independent short films.

In 2011 before starting his university studies in filmmaking, David made his first experimental short film almost twelve-minutes long, called UNCONSTANT VARIABLE, realized with Gonzalo Castillo Torres. It's a psychological thriller with surrealistic atmosphere, acted by David Freytes (Guy).

In February 2012, while coursing his studies in cinema direction, he realized his six-minutes second piece titled The White Lady, a psychological thriller acted by Adrian Moure, David Freytes and Eulalia Barceló.

David's last short film, called Human Nature was realized in March 2012, the piece takes ten minutes and twenty-six seconds; it's a drama placed in Barcelona, Spain, acted by Adrian Moure (Jordi) and Samantha Senn (Laura).

Acted in the Venezuelan film The Psychiatrist as Osorio, a police detective. Was also first assistant director in the mentioned film.

Actually, David has written two screenplays for feature films: "Metastasis", a psychological terror history located in Barcelona-Spain, and Regression, a black comedy set in Venezuela.

=== Short films ===
- 2014 - El Psiquiatra (Dir. Manuel Pífano) Osorio
- 2012 - Naturaleza Humana (Dir. David Freytes)
- 2012 - La Dama Blanca (Dir. David Freytes) Hombre misterioso
- 2011 - Variable Inconstante (Dir. David Freytes) Guy

=== Soap opera ===
- 2009 - Libres Como el Viento (RCTV) Dionisio (Adolescente)
- 2008 - Isa TKM (Nickelodeon) El Productor
