= Silvana sin lana =

- Genre: Telenovela
- Created by: Fiorella Urioste
- Based on: Pituca sin lucas by Rodrigo Bastidas & Elena Múñoz
- Written by: Luis Miguel Martínez; Sandra Velasco
- Directed by: Luis Manzo; Ricardo Schwarz
- Creative director: Pedro de Larrechea
- Starring: Maritza Rodríguez; Carlos Ponce; Marimar Vega; Adriana Barraza
- Theme music composer: Carlos Ponce; Joel Someillan
- Opening theme: "Qué bonito es lo bonito" performed by Carlos Ponce
- Country of origin: United States
- Original language: Spanish
- No. of episodes: 121

Production
- Executive producer: Carmen Cecilia Urbaneja
- Producer: Aimée Godínez
- Editor: Ellery Albarran
- Camera setup: Multi-camera

Original release
- Network: Telemundo
- Release: July 19, 2016 – January 16, 2017

Silvana sin lana (stylized as Silvana $in lana) is an American telenovela adapted by Sandra Velasco for Telemundo. It is based on the 2014 Chilean telenovela Pituca sin lucas, created by Rodrigo Bastidas and Elena Muñoz. The series is directed by Luis Manzo and Ricardo Schwarz, with Carmen Cecilia Urbaneja as executive producer. It premiered on July 19, 2016.

The series stars Maritza Rodríguez as Silvana, Carlos Ponce as Manuel, Marimar Vega as Stella and Adriana Barraza as Trinidad.

== Synopsis ==
Silvana "Chivis" (Maritza Rodríguez), is a wealthy socialite with three daughters. When her husband flees from police before he’s arrested for fraud, Chivis and her family are left broke and homeless. She is forced to move to a modest middle class neighborhood of working people. Here she meets her neighbor Manuel (Carlos Ponce), who owns a seafood business located in a large fish market. Manuel, his daughter and three sons are wary of everyone from high society and have issues with people who come from that social class. Once they meet, though, the attraction builds, but they do their utmost not to disrupt the balance of their lives and their families’ lives, regarding the difference in social status to be an obstacle to the love they feel.

== Cast ==
=== Main ===
- Maritza Rodríguez as Silvana "Chivis" Rivapalacios de Gallardo
- Carlos Ponce as Manuel Gallardo
- Marimar Vega as Stella Pérez
- Adriana Barraza as Trinidad "Trini" Altamirano de Rivapalacios

=== Recurring ===
- Marcela Guirado as María José Villaseñor
- Ricardo Abarca as Vicente Gallardo
- Thali García as María de los Ángeles Villaseñor
- Alexandra Pomales as Lucía Gallardo
- Briggitte Bozzo as María Guadalupe Villaseñor
- Santiago Torres as Pedrito Gallardo
- Patricio Gallardo as Jorge Gallardo
- Roberto Escobar as Antonio José Villaseñor
- Samantha Dagnino as Margarita Hernández
- Raury Rolander as Alfonso "Poncho" Archundia
- Vince Miranda as Andres Montenegro
- Javier Valcárcel Domingo "Dominique" Gomez
- Eduardo Ibarrola as Don Benito de Mendoza
- Aniluli Muñecas as Jennifer
- Martha Pabón as Laura de Montenegro
- Ana Carolina Grajales as Alejandra
- Andres Cortino as Juanito
- Estefany Oliveira as Genesis
- Gabriel Tarantini as Benjamin González
- Carl Mergenthaler as Rafael Linares
- Samantha Lopez as Juanita Gallardo
- Denise Novell as Fashionista

== Awards and nominations ==
Year	Award	Category	Nominated	Result
2017	Miami Life Awards	Best Female Lead in a Telenovela	Maritza Rodríguez	Nominated
2017	Miami Life Awards	Best Male Lead in a Telenovela	Carlos Ponce	Nominated
2017	Miami Life Awards	Best Supporting Actress	Alexandra Pomales	Won
2017	Miami Life Awards	Best Supporting Actress	Samantha Dagnino	Nominated
2017	Miami Life Awards	Best Supporting Actor	Javier Valcárcel	Nominated
2017	Miami Life Awards	Best Supporting Actor	Ricardo Abarca	Nominated
2017	Miami Life Awards	Young Actress	Mylena Barrios	Won
2017	Miami Life Awards	Young Actress	Ginna Rodríguez	Won
2017	Miami Life Awards	Best telenovela	Silvana sin lana	Nominated
2017	Your World Awards	Favorite Series	Silvana sin lana	Nominated
2017	Your World Awards	Favorite Lead Actor	Carlos Ponce	Nominated
2017	Your World Awards	Favorite Lead Actress	Maritza Rodríguez	Nominated
2017	Your World Awards	The Best Bad Girl	Marimar Vega	Nominated
2017	Your World Awards	Favorite Actor	Ricardo Abarca	Nominated
2017	Your World Awards	Favorite Actress	Adriana Barraza	Nominated
2017	Your World Awards	The Perfect Couple	Carlos Ponce and Maritza Rodríguez	Nominated
2017	Your World Awards	The Best Actor with Bad Luck	Carlos Ponce	Nominated
