= Andrés Gómez (actor) =

Venezuelan actor, model and singer

- Born: Andrés Tito Gómez; 27 November 1983 (age 41); Caracas, Venezuela
- Other names: Actor, model, singer

Andrés Gómez (born 27 November 1983 in Caracas, Venezuela), is a Venezuelan actor, model and singer.

== Filmography ==
Television
| Year | Title | Character | Notes |
|---|---|---|---|
| 2009 | Portada's | Himself | Animator |
| 2014 | Consentidos estrellas | Himself | Special Guest |

Telenovelas
| Year | Title | Character | Notes |
|---|---|---|---|
| 2008 | Te llegué a querer | | Recurring cast |
| 2009 | ¡Qué clase de amor! | Diego Padilla | Main protagonist |
| 2010–2011 | Fanatikda | Phillipe Blanche | Special Guest |
| 2011 | El combo amarillo | Ken | Special Guest |
| 2013 | De todas maneras Rosa | Enzo Rinaldy | Recurring cast |
