= Fighting Irish Media =

Sports production arm of University of Notre Dame

- Formerly: Fighting Irish Digital Media
- Type: Subsidiary
- Industry: Television production
- Founded: 2011 (as Fighting Irish Digital Media)
- Headquarters: Joyce Center, Notre Dame, Indiana, United States
- Key people: Aaron Horvath (Senior Associate Athletics Director, Media, Brand & Communications); Derek Coleman (Associate Athletics Director for Production); Emma Schneider (Associate Athletics Director for Design & Brand); Katy Lonergan (Associate Athletics Director for Strategic Communications)
- Owner: University of Notre Dame
- Parent: Notre Dame Athletic Department
- Subsidiaries: WatchND; Fighting Irish TV

Fighting Irish Media, founded in 2011 as Fighting Irish Digital Media, is a sports video production company on the campus of the University of Notre Dame that produces national and regional live broadcasts, social media videos, and live videoboard shows for Notre Dame Fighting Irish Athletics. Much of FIM's employees are current Notre Dame students who work cameras, replay, and sound, as well as are technical directors, announcers, production assistants, and directors for live events produced both for regional, such as NBC Sports Chicago, and national broadcasts, such as ESPN, NBC, and ACC Network.

== History ==
Founded in 2011 by small group headed by then Notre Dame Director of Digital Media, Dan Skendzel, FIM has greatly expanded the university's production ability and content quality. Fighting Irish Media runs the production days for all Fighting Irish Athletics teams, most of the non-live video seen on NBC during Notre Dame Football broadcasts. Until November 2018, much of FIM's videos were released under the WatchND moniker. Fighting Irish Media is the main producer for Notre Dame college athletics live broadcasts, social media videos, and videoboard productions. FIM works with ESPN, NBC Sports, and other national broadcasting companies in producing Notre Dame sporting events for national broadcast.

Since Fighting Irish Digital Media's start in a small room in the corner of Notre Dame Stadium in 2011, the production company has since expanded into the northwest corner of the Joyce Center, and the new Martin Media Center, inside the newly built Corbett Hall on the east side of Notre Dame Stadium, which also houses sister production companies, Grotto Network and Notre Dame Studios.

In 2017, Fighting Irish Media was instrumental in the success of the videoboard installed inside Notre Dame Stadium for the 2017 football season. Mike Bonner, former director of the Yankee Stadium and Mile High Stadium videoboards, was hired by Fighting Irish Media to launch Notre Dame's first football videoboard. Bonner who also has extensive experience as a videoboard director for the Summer Olympics, directed the videoboard for its first three-season before taking a job running the video board for the Carolina Panthers in 2020.

Since the installation of the football videoboard many major non-university events, including a friendly match between Liverpool FC and Borussia Dortmund, a Garth Brooks (which was the first concert in Notre Dame Stadium history), and the 2019 NHL Winter Classic between the Chicago Blackhawks and Boston Bruins. FIM was part of the production teams for each of these events.

FIM helped launch the ACC Network in August 2019. Fighting Irish Media also produced and directed the premiere of the Notre Dame Fan Feed on NBC Sports, for the final home game of the 2019 football season. The show included the radio play-by-play, a studio crew of Ahmed Fareed, Jessica Smetana, former Irish running back Darius Walker, and injured current linebacker Daelin Hayes, live looks at Notre Dame Stadium's traditions rarely seen on television, including the Fighting Irish Marching Band, fans in the stands, and different looks around the stadium.

Fighting Irish Media also produced a handful of podcasts including Podward Notre Dame, an Inside Look at Fighting Irish Media, and Stronger Scars, a Podcast created and hosted by current Notre Dame Women's Soccer player Bailey Cartwright.

In 2024, Fighting Irish Media is producing docuseries titled Here Come The Irish that follows the 2024 Notre Dame football team and will be released on Peacock between August 2024 and January 2025.

== Awards ==
In 2013, Fighting Irish Media won its first award, the inaugural Sports Video Group Technology Leadership Award. In 2014, FIM won three Bronze Telly Awards and the College Sports Media Awards' Most Outstanding Program Series Award. FIM won 5 Telly Awards, including its first Silver Telly, in 2015, as well as their first Chicago/Midwest Regional Emmy Award. In 2016, FIM won Outstanding Program Series in the Collegiate Athletics Category at the SVG College Sports Media Awards, as well as 9 more Telly Awards, including 4 Silver Tellys. FIM also won two Chicago/Midwest Regional Emmys in 2016. In 2017, FIM again won two Chicago/Midwest Regional Emmys and the award for Outstanding Live Non-Game Production at the SVG College Sports Media Awards. FIM again won six Regional Emmys in 2019. At the 2020 SVG College Sports Media Awards FIM won the award for Outstanding Special. FIM earned Hashtag Sports’ Best in Sports Communication Strategy award in 2022 for its work during the football coaching transition in late 2021.

As of September 2020, Fighting Irish Media has won 14 Chicago/Midwest Regional Emmy Awards, six SVG College Sports Media Awards, and 17 Telly Awards-five Silver and 12 Bronze.
