= 2026 in Argentina =

- Decades: 2000s; 2010s; 2020s; 2030s
- See also: Other events of 2026; List of years in Argentina

Events in the year 2026 in Argentina

== Incumbents ==
- President: Javier Milei
- Vice President: Victoria Villarruel

== Events ==
=== January ===
- 15 January – The government declares the Muslim Brotherhood and its associate chapters in Egypt, Jordan, and Lebanon as terrorist organizations. The organizations include the Muslim Brotherhood in Egypt, the Islamic Group, and the Islamic Action Front.
- 30 January – 2026 Argentina wildfires: The government declares a state of emergency in Chubut, Río Negro, Neuquén and La Pampa provinces due to wildfires.

=== February ===
- 5 February – Argentina and the United States sign a trade agreement reducing tariffs on most goods.
- 6–22 February – Argentina at the 2026 Winter Olympics
- 19 February – A general strike is held in protest against a labor reform bill proposed by the Milei government.
- 26 February – The Argentine Senate ratifies the EU–Mercosur Partnership Agreement.
- 28 February – Iran war: Argentina expresses support for the United States and Israel in the war against Iran.

=== March ===
- 17 March – Foreign minister Pablo Quirno announces the country's formal withdrawal from the World Health Organization.
- 30 March – A 15-year-old student fatally shoots another student and injures eight others at a school in San Cristóbal, Santa Fe, before being taken into custody.

=== April ===
- 2 April – Argentina expels Iranian chargé d'affaires Mohsen Soltani Tehrani after Iranian officials issue statements that Argentina describes as false and offensive. The move follows Argentina's designation of the Islamic Revolutionary Guard Corps as a terrorist organization.
- 23 April – President Milei orders the expulsion of the entire presidential press corps from the Casa Rosada, citing unauthorized filming inside the office.
- 26 April – Authorities at Ezeiza International Airport seize more than 700 living and dead marine animals trafficked from Kenya.

=== May ===
- 1 May – The EU–Mercosur Partnership Agreement comes into effect.
- 30 May – The body of 14-year old Agostina Vega is found sexually assaulted, dismembered and hanged in Córdoba, triggering nationwide protests.

=== June ===
- 11 June–19 July – Argentina participates at the 2026 FIFA World Cup.

=== July ===
- 24 July – The United States imposes a 10% tariff on Argentina, citing the presence of alleged forced labor in the supply chain.
- 19 July – Argentina finishes second at the 2026 FIFA World Cup after losing to Spain 1–0 at the final.

=== August ===
- 21 August – A federal judge is removed from office by the Jury of Impeachment over antisemitic social media posts for the first time in over a century.

=== September ===
- 4 September – A court rules that Argentina must return an 18th century painting stolen by Nazis from a Dutch Jewish art collector and missing for eighty years prior to being photographed in 2025 hanging in the house of the daughter of a senior SS officer, who had fled to Argentina after World War II, to the rightful owner's heir.
- 12–26 September – 2026 South American Games

=== October ===
- 15 October – Thousands of students, teachers, trade unionists, and opposition activists peacefully protest in Buenos Aires against President Milei's budget cuts to education spending, until groups of hooded demonstrators began throwing stones and other projectiles at police, who dispersed them with tear gas and water cannon.

=== November ===
- 8 November – Pope Leo XIV visits Argentina as part of a 12-day visit to Latin America.
- 11 November – Argentina's air force and navy are named "terrorist organizations" by Iran.

== Holidays ==
- 1 January – New Year's Day
- 16–17 February – Carnival
- 24 March – Day of Remembrance for Truth and Justice
- 2 April –
  - Malvinas Day
  - Good Friday
- 1 May – Labour Day
- 25 May – First National Government
- 15 June – Martín Miguel de Güemes Day
- 20 June – Flag Day
- 9 July – Independence Day
- 17 August – General José de San Martín Memorial Day
- 13 October – Day of Respect for Cultural Diversity
- 23 November – National Sovereignty Day
- 8 December – Immaculate Conception Day
- 25 December – Christmas Day

== Art and entertainment ==
- List of Argentine submissions for the Academy Award for Best International Feature Film
- List of 2026 box office number-one films in Argentina
- List of Argentine films of 2026

== Deaths ==
- January 4 – Horacio Usandizaga, 86, senator (1995–2003) and mayor of Rosario (1983–1989)
- January 17 – Guillermo Salatino, 80, sports journalist (Radio Continental).
- January 21 – Raúl Guglielminetti, 84, intelligence officer and convicted criminal (Batallón de Inteligencia 601).
- April 6 – Miguel Ángel De Marco, 86, military officer, academic and historian, member of the National Academy of History of Argentina.
- April 20 – Luis Brandoni, 86, actor (The Truce, State of Reality, Waiting for the Hearse) and politician, deputy (1997–2001).
- April 21 – Luis Puenzo, 80, film director and screenwriter (The Official Story), Oscar winner (1986).
- June 3 – Marita Monteleone, 68, radio broadcaster.
- June 5 – Indio Solari, 77, musician and singer, co-founder of Patricio Rey y sus Redonditos de Ricota.
- June 8 – María Rosa Fugazot, 83, actress.
- June 14 –
  - Taty Almeida, 95, human rights activist, founding member of Mothers of Plaza de Mayo.
  - Gaspi, 23, YouTuber and Internet personality.
  - Lucas A. Vignale, 27, film director (The River Train) and screenwriter.
- June 26 – Ernestina Pais, 54, journalist and television presenter.
- July 24 – Horacio Muratore, 74, president of the FIBA (2014–2019).
- August 8 – Jorge Messi, 68, businessman and sports agent (Lionel Messi).
- August 31 – Lilia Lardone, 84, writer and novelist
- September 5 – Alberto Iribarne, 76, minister of justice (2005–2007)
- September 9 – Samuel Gelblung, 82, journalist and television presenter
- September 17 – Blas Wilfredo Omar Jaime, 44, native speaker of the Chaná language.
- September 18 – Eugenio Zanetti, 79, production designer (Restoration, What Dreams May Come, Flatliners), Oscar winner (1996).
- September 29 – Juan Carlos Pagotto, 74, lawyer, senator (since 2023), member of the Legislature of La Rioja (1993–1997).
- October 7 – Piero, 81, Italian-born singer-songwriter.
- November 10 – Marcos Camino, 76, accordionist (Los Palmeras).
