= 2025 in Argentina =

- Decades: 2000s; 2010s; 2020s; 2030s
- See also: Other events of 2025; List of years in Argentina

Events in the year 2025 in Argentina

== Incumbents ==
- President: Javier Milei
- Vice President: Victoria Villarruel

== Events ==
=== February ===
- 4 February – One person is killed in a wildfire in Mariano I. Loza, Corrientes Province.
- 5 February –
- President Milei orders Argentina's withdrawal from the World Health Organization, citing “profound differences in health management", particularly during the COVID-19 pandemic.
- President Milei signs a decree banning gender-affirming care for people under the age of 18.
- 15 February – President Milei orders an investigation into improper conduct following the collapse of the cryptocurrency $LIBRA, which he had publicly promoted the previous day.
- 20 February – President Milei orders two days of national mourning for the Bibas family, abducted by Hamas during the 7 October attacks in 2023 and who died in captivity in the Gaza Strip.
- 25 February – President Milei appoints Ariel Lijo and Manuel García-Mansilla to the Supreme Court, bypassing the Congress during its summer recess.

=== March ===
- 5 March – A blackout caused by the failure of a high-voltage power line hits parts of Buenos Aires, leaving more than 622,000 customers without electricity.
- 9 March – Sixteen people are killed in Bahía Blanca following severe flooding.
- 21 March – The United States imposes sanctions on former president Cristina Fernández de Kirchner and former planning minister Julio de Vido for corruption.
- 24 March – The Milei administration announces the declassification of files from the Argentine Armed Forces relating to the 1976–1983 military dictatorship, along with all other documentation produced in different periods but related to the actions of the armed forces.
- 25 March – President Milei orders the release and declassification of all official records concerning German Nazis who sought refuge in refuge in Argentina after World War II.
- 31 March – Konstantin Rudnev, founder of the Russia-based Ashram Shambala sect, is arrested along with 13 followers in separate operations at Bariloche and Buenos Aires on human trafficking charges.

=== April ===
- 3 April – The Senate votes to reject the appointment by President Milei of Ariel Lijo and Manuel García-Mansilla to the Supreme Court.
- 6 April – A bus overturns in General La Madrid Partido, Buenos Aires Province, killing five people and injuring more than 20 others.
- 10 April – A general strike is held in protest against President Milei's austerity policies.
- 11 April – The International Monetary Fund approves a $20 billion loan to Argentina.

=== May ===
- 2 May – A magnitude 7.4 earthquake hits the Drake Passage off the coast of Ushuaia, prompting tsunami warnings and evacuations in Tierra del Fuego as well as in parts of Antarctica and southern Chile.
- 14 May – President Milei signs an executive order tightening citizenship requirements, including requiring immigrants to spend two straight years in Argentina or make a significant financial investment in the country.
- 16 May – A heavy downpour causes flooding throughout Greater Buenos Aires, killing four people and displacing thousands.
- 18 May – President Milei's La Libertad Avanza party places first in legislative elections in Buenos Aires with 30% of the vote, followed by the Justicialist Party and the ruling Republican Proposal.
- 29 May – A mistrial is declared in the case of seven medical professionals accused of negligence in the death of footballer Diego Maradona following allegations of misconduct by one of the judges hearing the case.

=== June ===
- 10 June – The Supreme Court of Argentina upholds the 2022 conviction and six-year prison sentence of former president Cristina Fernández de Kirchner for corruption.
- 12 June – President Milei is awarded the Genesis Prize by Israel.

=== July ===
- 21 July – Argentina announces that Chinese citizens holding valid U.S. entry visas will no longer require Argentine visas for tourism or business visits.
- 24 July – An Argentine appeals court orders Google to pay $12,500 in compensation to a man who was caught naked in his property on a Google Street View image published online.

=== August ===
- 4 August – President Milei vetoes bills that would have increased spending on pensions and expanded protections for the disabled, citing the country's fiscal deficit.
- 20 August – Clashes break out between spectators at a Copa Sudamericana football match between Independiente and Universidad de Chile at the Estadio Libertadores de América in Buenos Aires, resulting in 10 injuries, 90 arrests, and the suspension of the game. The incident leads to Independiente being disqualified from the 2025 Copa Sudamericana on 4 September.

=== September ===
- 2 September – A court places the daughter of Nazi adviser Friedrich Kadgien and her husband under house arrest in Mar del Plata and accuses them of stealing the painting Portrait of a Lady by Giuseppe Ghislandi, which had been missing since 1945. The painting is turned over by Kadgien's lawyer to authorities the next day.
- 3 September – FIFA issues a CHF120,000 ($149,000)-fine on the Argentine Football Association over racist chanting by fans in Buenos Aires during a 2026 FIFA World Cup qualification match between the national team and Colombia in June.
- 4 September – The Senate overrides President Milei's veto of a bill raising disability benefits following a 63-7 vote.
- 7 September – 2025 Buenos Aires provincial election: The Justicialist Party wins 47% of the vote, followed by President Milei's La Libertad Avanza at 34%.
- 10 September –
  - President Milei upgrades the Secretariat of the Interior into a ministry, which he had downgraded in 2023.
  - President vetoes a bill that would have increased funding for public universities.
- 16 September – Argentina, as a member of Mercosur, signs a free trade agreement with Iceland, Liechtenstein, Norway and Switzerland.
- 24 September – The bodies of three people who were tortured by drug gangs during an Instagram livestream are discovered outside Buenos Aires.

=== October ===
- 2 October – The Senate overrides President Milei's vetoes of bills raising funding for public universities and pediatric care.
- 8 October – Fernando Sabag Montiel is sentenced to 10 years' imprisonment for the attempted assassination of Cristina Fernández de Kirchner in 2022.
- 9 October – The United States enters into an agreement to buy Argentine pesos and undertake a $20-billion currency swap framework with the Central Bank of Argentina as part of efforts to support Argentina's finances.
- 14 October – During a White House meeting with Argentine President Javier Milei, US President Donald Trump conditioned the 2025 United States bailout of Argentina on the electoral success of Milei's party in the upcoming election. The next day, Bessent told reporters that an additional US$20 billion in financial aid could come for Argentina through sovereign funds and investments from private banks.
- 19 October – Argentina finishes in second place at the 2025 FIFA U-20 World Cup in Chile after losing to Morocco 2-0 at the final in Santiago.
- 26 October –
  - 2025 Argentine legislative election: President Milei's La Libertad Avanza party wins a majority of contested seats in both houses of the Argentine National Congress.
  - A bus collides with a car before plunging off of a bridge and into a stream in Puerto Iguazú, Misiones, killing 13 people and injuring 29 others.
- 31 October – Guillermo Francos and Lisandro Catalán resign from their respective positions in the Milei cabinet as Chief of the Cabinet of Ministers and Minister of the Interior.

=== November ===
- 11 November – Twenty people are injured when a train derails along the Domingo Faustino Sarmiento Railway in Liniers, Buenos Aires.
- 14 November – Twenty-five people are injured in an explosion and fire at an industrial park in Carlos Spegazzini, Buenos Aires Province.
- 18 November –
  - A special judicial panel removes Judge Julieta Makintach for ethical violations that resulted in the mistrial of the Diego Maradona death case.
  - A federal court orders the forfeiture of nearly $500 million in assets and properties from former president Cristina Fernández de Kirchner and several relatives and associates following her conviction for corruption.

=== December ===
- 9 December – Police raid the headquarters of the Argentine Football Association and several football clubs as part of an investigation into money-laundering.

== Holidays ==
- 1 January – New Year's Day
- 3–4 March – Carnival
- 24 March – Day of Remembrance for Truth and Justice
- 2 April – Malvinas Day
- 18 April – Good Friday
- 1 May – Labour Day
- 25 May – First National Government
- 16 June – Martín Miguel de Güemes Day
- 20 June – Flag Day
- 9 July – Independence Day
- 18 August – General José de San Martín Memorial Day
- 13 October – Day of Respect for Cultural Diversity
- 12 November – National Sovereignty Day
- 8 December – Immaculate Conception Day
- 25 December – Christmas Day

== Deaths ==
- 1 January – Leo Dan, 82, singer and composer.
- 21 April – Pope Francis (born Jorge Mario Bergoglio), 88, pope (since 2013), archbishop of Buenos Aires (1998–2013).
- 5 May – Luis Galván, 77, footballer (Talleres de Córdoba, national team), world champion (1978).
- 26 June – Lalo Schifrin, 93, composer.
- 30 June – Luis Pascual Dri, 98, Roman Catholic cardinal, cardinal-deacon of Sant'Angelo in Pescheria (since 2023).
- 19 July – Aldo Monges, 83, folk singer.
- 21 July – Jorge Aulicino, 75, poet and journalist.
- 7 August –
  - Osvaldo Piro, 88, bandoneonist and conductor.
  - Juan Chavetta, 55, illustrator.
- 8 August –
  - Tico Rodríguez Paz, 85, journalist.
  - León Balter, 97, journalist.
- 18 August – Jorge Maestro, 73, screenwriter and playwright.
- 20 August – Norma Nolan, 87, model and beauty pageant winner, Miss Universe (1962).
- 6 September – Rosa Tarlovsky de Roisinblit, 106, activist, co-founder of the Grandmothers of Plaza de Mayo.
- 8 October – Miguel Ángel Russo, 69, football player (Estudiantes, national team) and manager (Boca Juniors).
- 12 November – Dylan, 9, Rough Collie dog, presidential pet (Alberto Fernández).
- 14 December – Eva Giberti, 96, psychologist and academic.

== Art and entertainment ==
- List of Argentine submissions for the Academy Award for Best International Feature Film
- List of 2025 box office number-one films in Argentina
- List of Argentine films of 2025
