= 2022 in Argentina =

- Decades: 2000s; 2010s; 2020s; 2030s
- See also: Other events of 2022; List of years in Argentina

Events in the year 2022 in Argentina.

== Incumbents ==
- President: Alberto Fernández
- Vice President: Cristina Fernández de Kirchner

=== Governors ===
- Governor of Buenos Aires Province: Axel Kicillof
- Governor of Catamarca Province: Raúl Jalil
- Governor of Chaco Province: Jorge Capitanich
- Governor of Chubut Province: Mariano Arcioni
- Governor of Córdoba: Juan Schiaretti
- Governor of Corrientes Province: Gustavo Valdés
- Governor of Entre Ríos Province: Gustavo Bordet
- Governor of Formosa Province: Gildo Insfrán
- Governor of Jujuy Province: Gerardo Morales
- Governor of La Pampa Province: Sergio Ziliotto
- Governor of La Rioja Province: Ricardo Quintela
- Governor of Mendoza Province: Rodolfo Suárez
- Governor of Misiones Province: Oscar Herrera Ahuad
- Governor of Neuquén Province: Omar Gutiérrez
- Governor of Río Negro Province: Arabela Carreras
- Governor of Salta Province: Gustavo Sáenz
- Governor of San Juan Province: Sergio Uñac
- Governor of San Luis Province: Alberto Rodríguez Saá
- Governor of Santa Cruz Province: Alicia Kirchner
- Governor of Santa Fe Province: Omar Perotti
- Governor of Santiago del Estero: Gerardo Zamora
- Governor of Tierra del Fuego: Gustavo Melella
- Governor of Tucumán: Osvaldo jaldo

=== Vice Governors ===
- Vice Governor of Buenos Aires Province: Verónica Magario
- Vice Governor of Catamarca Province: Rubén Dusso
- Vice Governor of Chaco Province: Analía Rach Quiroga
- Vice Governor of Corrientes Province: Gustavo Canteros
- Vice Governor of Entre Rios Province: María Laura Stratta
- Vice Governor of Formosa Province: Eber Wilson Solís
- Vice Governor of Jujuy Province: Carlos Haquim
- Vice Governor of La Pampa Province: Mariano Fernández
- Vice Governor of La Rioja Province: Florencia López
- Vice Governor of Mendoza Province: Mario Abed
- Vice Governor of Misiones Province: Carlos Omar Arce
- Vice Governor of Neuquén Province: Marcos Koopmann
- Vice Governor of Rio Negro Province: Alejandro Palmieri
- Vice Governor of Salta Province: Antonio Marocco
- Vice Governor of San Juan Province: Roberto Gattoni
- Vice Governor of San Luis Province: Eduardo Mones Ruiz
- Vice Governor of Santa Cruz: Eugenio Quiroga
- Vice Governor of Santa Fe Province: Alejandra Rodenas
- Vice Governor of Santiago del Estero: Carlos Silva Neder
- Vice Governor of Tierra del Fuego: Mónica Urquiza

== Ongoing events ==
- COVID-19 pandemic in Argentina

== Events ==
- 21 January – Argentina formally requests Russia to arrest Iranian minister Mohsen Rezaee, who is on a trip to Russia, based on the accusation by Argentina of Rezai's involvement in the 1994 AMIA bombing. Russia did not immediately respond.
- June 2022 – the Ramón Castillo Neonatal Hospital in Córdoba is intervened at after a series of deaths of healthy babies, which culminated in the arrest of nurse Brenda Agüero on 19 August.
- 20 August – 2022 Tucumán legionellosis outbreak
- 1 September – Attempted assassination of Cristina Fernández de Kirchner
- 18 December – Argentina wins the FIFA World Cup in Qatar

== Deaths ==
- 13 January – Mario Cámpora, diplomat (b. 1930).
- 15 January – Aurora del Mar, actress (b. 1934).
- 19 January – Pedro Rubens David, magistrate (b. 1929).
- 20 January – Eduardo Flores, association football player (b. 1944).
- 1 July - Pedro Pablo García Caffi, musician and singer (b. 1944).
- 13 July - Carlos Quintana, trade unionist and politician (b. 1950).
