= 2021 in Argentina =

- Decades: 2000s; 2010s; 2020s; 2030s
- See also: Other events of 2021; List of years in Argentina

Events in the year 2021 in Argentina.

== Incumbents ==
- President: Alberto Fernández
- Vice President: Cristina Fernández de Kirchner

=== Governors ===
- Governor of Buenos Aires Province: Axel Kicillof
- Governor of Catamarca Province: Raúl Jalil
- Governor of Chaco Province: Jorge Capitanich
- Governor of Chubut Province: Mariano Arcioni
- Governor of Córdoba: Juan Schiaretti
- Governor of Corrientes Province: Gustavo Valdés
- Governor of Entre Ríos Province: Gustavo Bordet
- Governor of Formosa Province: Gildo Insfrán
- Governor of Jujuy Province: Gerardo Morales
- Governor of La Pampa Province: Sergio Ziliotto
- Governor of La Rioja Province: Ricardo Quintela
- Governor of Mendoza Province: Rodolfo Suárez
- Governor of Misiones Province: Oscar Herrera Ahuad
- Governor of Neuquén Province: Omar Gutiérrez
- Governor of Río Negro Province: Arabela Carreras
- Governor of Salta Province: Gustavo Sáenz
- Governor of San Juan Province: Sergio Uñac
- Governor of San Luis Province: Alberto Rodríguez Saá
- Governor of Santa Cruz Province: Alicia Kirchner
- Governor of Santa Fe Province: Omar Perotti
- Governor of Santiago del Estero: Gerardo Zamora
- Governor of Tierra del Fuego: Gustavo Melella
- Governor of Tucumán: Juan Luis Manzur

=== Vice Governors ===
- Vice Governor of Buenos Aires Province: Verónica Magario
- Vice Governor of Catamarca Province: Rubén Dusso
- Vice Governor of Chaco Province: Analía Rach Quiroga
- Vice Governor of Corrientes Province: Gustavo Canteros
- Vice Governor of Entre Rios Province: María Laura Stratta
- Vice Governor of Formosa Province: Eber Wilson Solís
- Vice Governor of Jujuy Province: Carlos Haquim
- Vice Governor of La Pampa Province: Mariano Fernández
- Vice Governor of La Rioja Province: Florencia López
- Vice Governor of Mendoza Province: Mario Abed
- Vice Governor of Misiones Province: Carlos Omar Arce
- Vice Governor of Neuquén Province: Marcos Koopmann
- Vice Governor of Rio Negro Province: Alejandro Palmieri
- Vice Governor of Salta Province: Antonio Marocco
- Vice Governor of San Juan Province: Roberto Gattoni
- Vice Governor of San Luis Province: Eduardo Mones Ruiz
- Vice Governor of Santa Cruz: Eugenio Quiroga
- Vice Governor of Santa Fe Province: Alejandra Rodenas
- Vice Governor of Santiago del Estero: Carlos Silva Neder
- Vice Governor of Tierra del Fuego: Mónica Urquiza

== Ongoing events ==
- COVID-19 pandemic in Argentina

== Events ==
- 22 January – Germany rejects a claim that a request by Lufthansa Airlines to fly over Argentina en route to the Malvinas implies a recognition of them as Argentine territory. Lufthansa needs a new route to support a polar research expedition because the normal route has been suspended due to the COVID-19 pandemic in South Africa.
- 10 February – Argentina passes 2,000,000 confirmed cases and nearly 50,000 deaths related to COVID-19.
- 18 February – Thousands demonstrate against gender violence following the murder of Ursula Bahillo, 18.
- 19 February
  - A federal court sentences eight sailors and police officers and a civilian in the trial of crimes against humanity perpetrated during the military dictatorship of 1976–1983 at the Navy Petty-Officers School (Esma). Among those convicted are former Navy officer Carlos Castellvi, police officer Raúl Cabral, and civilian Miguel Conde.
  - Ginés González García resigns as Health Minister after it is revealed he provided preferential treatment for COVID-19 vaccines to journalist Horacio Verbitsky. Argentina has received only 1.5 million doses of vaccine for its population of 45 million. Two million have been infected and 50,000 people have died.
- 24 March – Argentina leaves the Lima Group, criticizing the participation of Juan Guaido.
- April 1 – COVID-19 pandemic: The National Institute of Statistics reports a steep increase in the poverty rates in 31 large cities, affecting 12 million people.
- April 3 – President Alberto Fernandez, 62, tests positive for COVID-19 despite having received the Sputnik V COVID-19 vaccine in January.
- 28 May – Police officer Luis Chocobar is sentenced to a suspended two-year prison term for the killing of an 18-year-old man in December 2017 while the youth escaped from a crime scene.
- June 9 – President Alberto Fernandez sets off a Twitter storm after saying, "The Mexicans came from the Indians, the Brazilians came from the jungle, but we Argentines came from the ships." He later apologizes.
- June 11 – A study by the Cámara Argentina de Internet (Cabase) reveals that 32% of homes do not have fixed access to Internet. The figure falls to 50% in some provinces.
- July 10 – The Argentina national football team wins the Copa América at the mythical Maracanã Stadium against Brazil. It was their first one since 1993.
- November 22 – Buenos Aires – A group of 9 hooded individuals hurled several bombs at the headquarters of Clarín Argentine newspaper on Monday night. The attack was filmed by surveillance cameras, which captured the moment when the group arrived on foot, at 11:05 PM, and hurled at least 7 Molotov cocktails – a type of homemade bomb in which a flammable liquid is placed inside a glass bottle – against the building of one of the country's main media outlets. The bombs damaged the building's façade and started a fire in the entrance, but no one was injured.

== Deaths ==
=== January ===
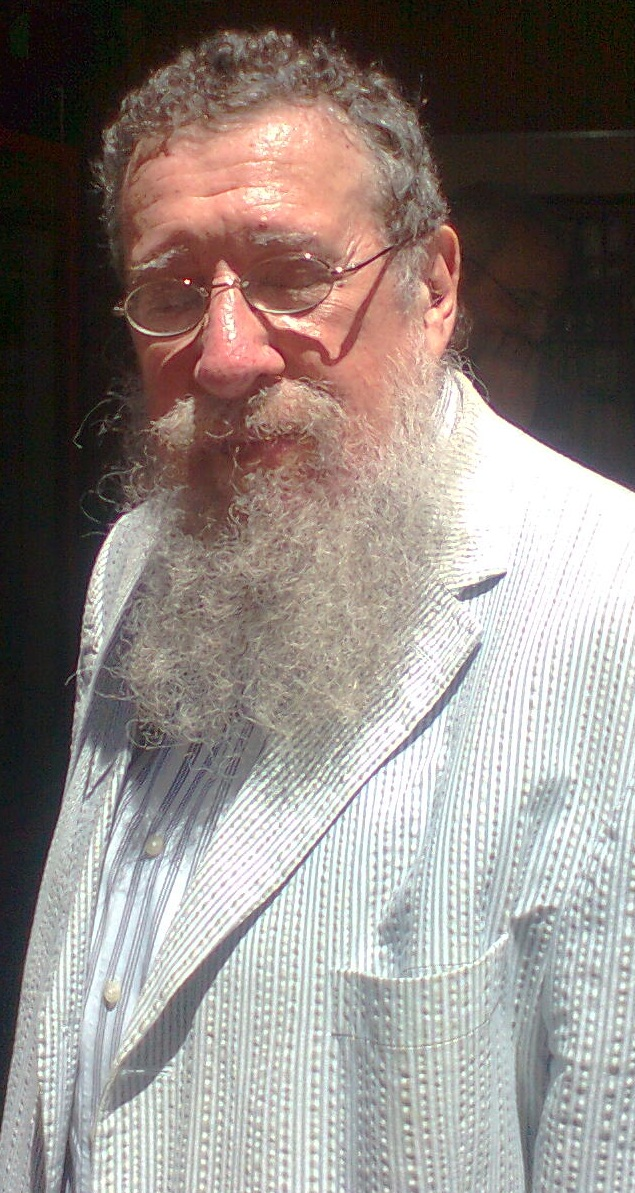
Carlos Escudé

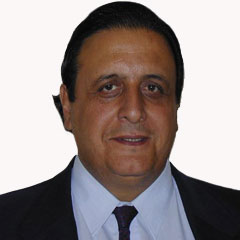
Raúl Baglini

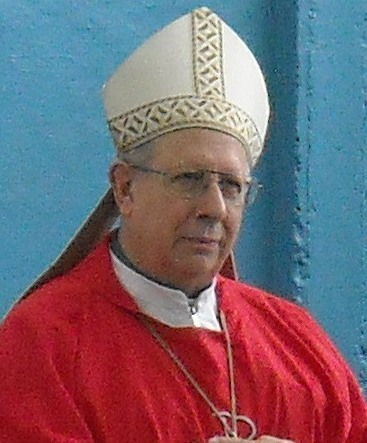
Guillermo Rodríguez Melgarejo

- 1 January – Carlos Escudé, political scientist and author (b. 1938).
- 3 January – Raúl Baglini, politician, MP (b. 1949).
- 4 January – Guillermo Rodríguez Melgarejo, Roman Catholic prelate, Bishop of San Martín (b 1943).
- 10 January – Jorge Cupeiro, 83, race car driver.
- 15 January – Vicente Cantatore, 85, football player (San Lorenzo, Tigre) and manager (Real Valladolid).
- 16 January – Juan Carlos Copes, Argentine tango dancer, choreographer, and performer (b. 1931).
- 21 January – José Pampuro, 71, politician, Minister of Defense (2003–2005), General Secretary of the Presidency (2002–2003) and Provisional President of the Senate (2006–2011).
- 23 January – Gabriel Ruiz Díaz, 45, bassist (Catupecu Machu).
- 28 January – César Isella, 82, singer-songwriter (Los Fronterizos).
- 30 January – Alberto Neuman, 87, classical pianist.

=== February ===
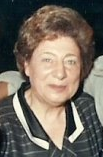
Ángela Sureda

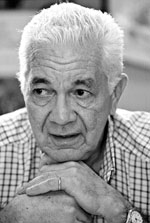
Ivan Izquierdo

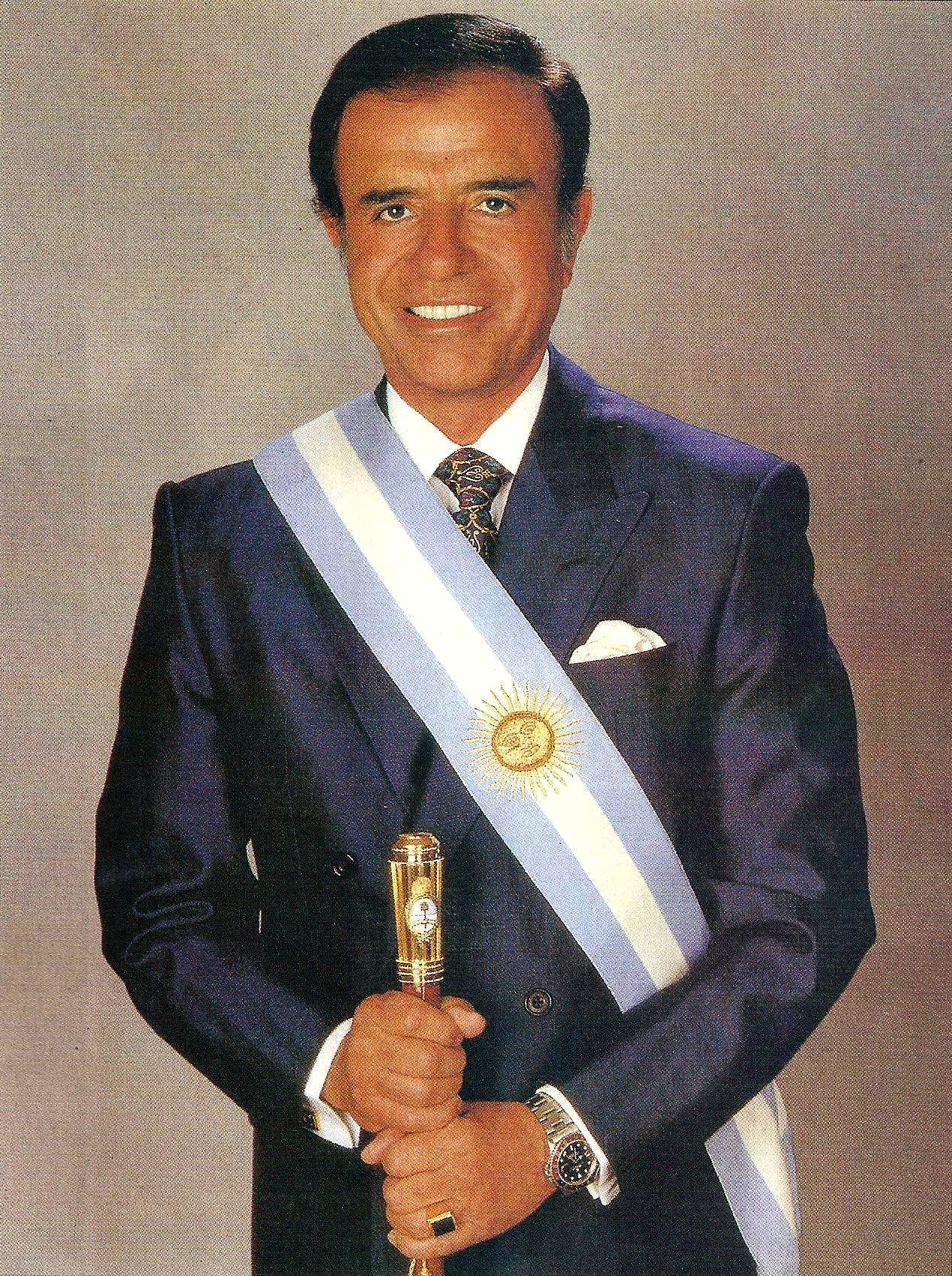
Carlos Menem

- 2 February – Julio Argentino Fernández, 75, agriculture production executive; heart disease.
- 5 February – Ángela Sureda, 99, lawyer, academic and politician, Deputy (1989–1993).
- 6 February – Osvaldo Mercuri, 76, politician, president of the Buenos Aires Province Chamber of Deputies (1989–1997, 2001–2005); COVID-19.
- 7 February – Adrián Di Blasi, 54, journalist and sports writer; COVID-19.
- 8 February – José Francisco Suárez, 80, referee, entrepreneur and gastronomic chef.
- 9 February – Ivan Izquierdo, 83, Argentine-born Brazilian neurobiologist; COVID-19.
- 10 February – Jorge Morel, 89, classical guitarist and composer.
- 12 February – Jorge Ricci, 74, actor and playwright.
- 14 February – Carlos Menem, 90, politician (Justicialist Party), President of Argentina (1989–1999), national senator (2005–2021).
- 15 February
  - Alberto Canapino, 57, racing car engineer; COVID-19.
  - Leopoldo Luque, 71, footballer (River Plate, Unión, national team), world champion (1978); COVID-19.
- 17 February – Omar Moreno Palacios, 82, folk singer-songwriter, guitarist and gaucho; encephalitis.
- 22 February – Élida Rasino, 65, politician; COVID-19.
- 26 February
  - José Guccione, 69, politician and physician, deputy (2011–2015); COVID-19.
  - Horacio Moráles, 77, Olympic footballer (1964).
- 27 February – Gipsy Bonafina, 63, actress (Amapola) and singer.

=== March to June ===
- 2 March – Carlos Sánchez, 68, humorist; cancer
- 9 March – Agustín Balbuena, 75, footballer (Colón de Santa Fe, Independiente).
- 12 March – Maximiliano Djerfy, 46, guitarist (Callejeros); cardiac arrest.
- 26 March – Horangel, 93, astrologist.
- 29 March – Carlos Busqued, 50, writer, radio producer, and engineer.
- 23 April – Mario Meoni, 56, politician, minister of transport (since 2019), mayor of Junín Partido (2003–2015) and Buenos Aires provincial deputy (1999–2003), traffic collision.
