= 2027 in Argentina =

- Decades: 2000s; 2010s; 2020s; 2030s
- See also: Other events of 2027; List of years in Argentina

Events in the year 2027 in Argentina

== Events ==
=== Predicted and scheduled ===
- 6 February – Solar eclipse of February 6, 2027 (total eclipse)
- 24 October – 2027 Argentine general election

== Holidays ==
- 1 January – New Year's Day
- 8–9 February – Carnival
- 24 March – Day of Remembrance for Truth and Justice
- 26 March – Good Friday
- 2 April – Malvinas Day
- 1 May – Labour Day
- 25 May – First National Government
- 20 June – Flag Day
- 21 June – Martín Miguel de Güemes Day
- 9 July – Independence Day
- 16 August – General José de San Martín Memorial Day
- 11 October – Day of Respect for Cultural Diversity
- 22 November – National Sovereignty Day
- 8 December – Immaculate Conception Day
- 25 December – Christmas Day

== Art and entertainment ==
- List of Argentine submissions for the Academy Award for Best International Feature Film
