= 2023 in Argentina =

- Decades: 2000s; 2010s; 2020s; 2030s
- See also: Other events of 2023; List of years in Argentina

Events in the year 2023 in Argentina.

== Incumbents ==
- President: Alberto Fernández (until December 10) – Javier Milei (starting December 10)
- Vice President: Cristina Fernández de Kirchner (until December 10) – Victoria Villarruel (starting December 10)

=== Governors ===
- Governor of Buenos Aires Province: Axel Kicillof
- Governor of Catamarca Province: Raúl Jalil
- Governor of Chaco Province: Jorge Capitanich
- Governor of Chubut Province: Mariano Arcioni
- Governor of Córdoba: Juan Schiaretti
- Governor of Corrientes Province: Gustavo Valdés
- Governor of Entre Ríos Province: Gustavo Bordet
- Governor of Formosa Province: Gildo Insfrán
- Governor of Jujuy Province: Gerardo Morales
- Governor of La Pampa Province: Sergio Ziliotto
- Governor of La Rioja Province: Ricardo Quintela
- Governor of Mendoza Province: Rodolfo Suárez
- Governor of Misiones Province: Oscar Herrera Ahuad
- Governor of Neuquén Province: Omar Gutiérrez
- Governor of Río Negro Province: Arabela Carreras
- Governor of Salta Province: Gustavo Sáenz
- Governor of San Juan Province: Sergio Uñac
- Governor of San Luis Province: Alberto Rodríguez Saá
- Governor of Santa Cruz Province: Alicia Kirchner
- Governor of Santa Fe Province: Omar Perotti
- Governor of Santiago del Estero: Gerardo Zamora
- Governor of Tierra del Fuego: Gustavo Melella
- Governor of Tucumán: Juan Luis Manzur

=== Vice Governors ===
- Vice Governor of Buenos Aires Province: Verónica Magario
- Vice Governor of Catamarca Province: Rubén Dusso
- Vice Governor of Chaco Province: Analía Rach Quiroga
- Vice Governor of Corrientes Province: Gustavo Canteros
- Vice Governor of Entre Rios Province: María Laura Stratta
- Vice Governor of Formosa Province: Eber Wilson Solís
- Vice Governor of Jujuy Province: Carlos Haquim
- Vice Governor of La Pampa Province: Mariano Fernández
- Vice Governor of La Rioja Province: Florencia López
- Vice Governor of Mendoza Province: Mario Abed
- Vice Governor of Misiones Province: Carlos Omar Arce
- Vice Governor of Neuquén Province: Marcos Koopmann
- Vice Governor of Rio Negro Province: Alejandro Palmieri
- Vice Governor of Salta Province: Antonio Marocco
- Vice Governor of San Juan Province: Roberto Gattoni
- Vice Governor of San Luis Province: Eduardo Mones Ruiz
- Vice Governor of Santa Cruz: Eugenio Quiroga
- Vice Governor of Santa Fe Province: Alejandra Rodenas
- Vice Governor of Santiago del Estero: Carlos Silva Neder
- Vice Governor of Tierra del Fuego: Mónica Urquiza

== Events ==
- Ongoing: COVID-19 pandemic in Argentina

=== February ===
- 22 February – Four senators leave the ruling Peronist coalition in the Senate to form a separate bloc, reducing the government’s support to 31 seats in the 72-seat chamber.

=== March ===
- 6 March: Argentine president Alberto Fernández announces the deployment of hundreds of federal security forces to the city of Rosario after an increase in violence between rival drug gangs.
- 22 March: Argentine mathematician Luis Caffarelli wins this year's Abel Prize "for his seminal contributions to regularity theory for nonlinear partial differential equations including free-boundary problems and the Monge–Ampère equation". He becomes the first Latin American to win this prize.

=== June ===
- 2 June: Disappearance of Cecilia Strzyzowksi.

=== August ===
- 13 August: Argentines vote in the primaries before the October general election: Javier Milei, a far-right libertarian outsider, unexpectedly wins the most votes with 30.5%, ahead of the main opposition coalition (28%) and the ruling Peronist coalition (27%).

=== October ===
- 22 October: Argentines vote for their new president.
- 23 October: Argentina has their first round of the two-round system, leaving Sergio Massa and Javier Milei for the second round with ~36% and ~30% of the votes respectively.
- 29 October: 2023 Argentine general election

=== November ===
- 19 November – 2023 Argentine general election: Javier Milei is elected president, defeating Sergio Massa with fifty-six percent of the vote to forty-four.

=== December ===
- 10 December: Inauguration of Javier Milei: Javier Milei is sworn in as the President of Argentina.
- 13 December – 2023 Copa Argentina final: Played at the Estadio Ciudad de Lanús – Néstor Díaz Pérez, Estudiantes de La Plata defeat Defensa y Justicia 1–0 to win their first Copa Argentina title; the winning goal is scored by Guido Carrillo.
- 16 December: At least 13 people are killed after a thunderstorm strikes Bahía Blanca.
- 20 December: Argentine monetary crisis: President Javier Milei announces and signs an emergency degree introducing a series of economic deregulation measures targeting more than 300 regulations, including property, export, and labor laws, to address the crisis.
- 21 December – Mass protest breaks out across Argentina, with demonstrations in Buenos Aires, Rosario, Mar del Plata, and Córdoba, opposing austerity measures and calling for social support.
- 26 December: The administration of Argentina's new President Javier Milei says the government will not renew contracts for more than 5,000 employees hired this year before he took office, as part of plans for cutbacks to the government.
- 27 December: Thousands of union members and activists in Argentina protest a decree from President Javier Milei imposing deregulation and austerity measures meant to revive the country's economy.
- 29 December: Argentine president Javier Milei sends a letter to BRICS, rejecting the bloc's invitation for Argentina to join.
