= Guglielminetti =

Guglielminetti is an Italian surname. Notable people with the surname include:

- Amalia Guglielminetti (1881–1941), Italian poet and writer
- Bruno Guglielminetti (1965-), Media personality related to new technology development
- Ernest Guglielminetti (1862–1943), Swiss medical doctor
- Raúl Guglielminetti (1941–2026), Argentine intelligence officer and convicted criminal
