= Guccione =

Guccione is an Italian language surname, which is derived from the given name Guccio. The name may refer to:

- Bob Guccione (1930–2010), American magazine publisher
- Bob Guccione, Jr. (born 1955), American magazine publisher
- Chris Guccione (tennis) (born 1985), Australian tennis player
- Chris Guccione (umpire) (born 1974), American baseball umpire
- José Guccione (1952–2021), Argentine politician and physician
- Juanita Guccione (née Anita Rice; 1904–1999), American painter and taxidermist
