= Salatino =

Salatino is a surname. Notable people with the surname include:

- Guillermo Salatino (1945–2026), Argentine sports journalist
- Kevin Salatino (fl. from 1991), American curator and museum director
