= Public holidays in Argentina =

The following are the national public holidays and other observances of Argentina.

Though holidays of many faiths are respected, public holidays usually include most Catholic based holidays. Historic holidays include the celebration of the May Revolution (25 May), Independence Day (9 July), Flag Day (20 June) and the death of José de San Martín (17 August).

The extended family gathers on Christmas Eve at around 9 p.m. for dinner, music, and often dancing. Candies are served just before midnight, when the fireworks begin. They also open gifts from Papá Noel (Father Christmas or "Santa Claus"). New Year's Day is also marked with fireworks. Other widely observed holidays include Good Friday, Easter, Labor Day (1 May) and Veterans Day (formerly Malvinas Day, 2 April).

== Public holidays ==
The "movable holidays" whose dates coincide with Tuesdays and Wednesdays will be moved to the previous Monday. Those that coincide with Thursday, Friday, Saturday and Sunday will be moved to the following Monday. Every employee is entitled to 15 paid public holidays and every year the government adds a few more holidays known as "bridge holidays" which means that a holiday lasts two days.

Day	English name	Spanish name	Type	Notes
January 1	New Year's Day	Año Nuevo	Immovable	Beginning of a new year.
Day 48 and 47 before Easter	Carnival Monday and Tuesday	Carnaval	Movable	Dates vary with Easter
March 24	Day of Remembrance for Truth and Justice	Día Nacional de la Memoria por la Verdad y la Justicia	Immovable	Anniversary of the coup d'état that started the 1976–1983 National Reorganization Process.
April 2	Day of the Veterans and Fallen of the Malvinas War	Día del Veterano y de los Caídos en la Guerra de Malvinas	Immovable	Tribute to the fallen in, and the veterans of, the 1982 Falklands War.
April 15	Good Friday	Viernes Santo	Movable	Christian holiday, date according to lunar calendar.
May 1	Labour Day	Día del Trabajador	Immovable	International holiday.
May 25	May Revolution	Día de la Revolución de Mayo	Immovable	Anniversary of the First National Government creation of the First National Government.
June 17	Anniversary of the Passing of General Martín Miguel de Güemes	Paso a la Inmortalidad del General Martín Miguel de Güemes	Movable	Anniversary of the death of Martín Miguel de Güemes, general of the Argentine War of Independence.
June 20	General Manuel Belgrano Memorial Day	Paso a la Inmortalidad del General Manuel Belgrano	Immovable	Anniversary of the death of Manuel Belgrano, creator of the Flag of Argentina.
July 9	Independence Day	Día de la Independencia	Immovable	Anniversary of the Declaration of Independence in 1816.
August 17	General José de San Martín Memorial Day	Paso a la Inmortalidad del General José de San Martín	Movable	Anniversary of the death of José de San Martín, liberator of Argentina, Chile and Peru.
October 12	Day of Respect for Cultural Diversity	Día del Respeto a la Diversidad Cultural	Movable	Día de la raza (English: Race day), anniversary of the arrival of Columbus to the Americas.
November 20	National Sovereignty Day	Día de la Soberanía Nacional	Movable	Anniversary of the 1845 Battle of Vuelta de Obligado against the Anglo-French blockade of the Río de la Plata.
December 8	Immaculate Conception Day	Día de la Inmaculada Concepción de María	Immovable	Christian holiday, conception of the Virgin Mary free from original sin.
December 25	Christmas Day	Navidad	Immovable	Christian holiday, Nativity of Jesus.

=== Non-working days ===
The following are federal non-working national or religious holidays, during which people of the following faiths are excused from work:

Day	English name	Spanish name	Religion	Notes
April 11, 12, 17 and 18	Passover	Pésaj	Judaism	Pesach. First two days and last two days. Date according to lunar calendar.
April 13	Holy Thursday	Jueves Santo	Catholicism	Date according to lunar calendar.
April 24	Day of Action for Tolerance and Respect among Peoples	Día de Acción por la Tolerancia y el Respeto entre los Pueblos	Armenians	Commemoration of the Armenian genocide.
June 25	Festival of Breaking of the Fast of the Holy Month of Ramadan	Fiesta de la Ruptura del Ayuno del Sagrado Mes de Ramadán	Islam	Eid al-Fitr. Date according to lunar calendar.
September 1	Festival of Sacrifice	Fiesta del Sacrificio	Islam	Eid al-Adha. Date according to lunar calendar.
September 21 and 22	Jewish New Year	Año Nuevo Judío	Judaism	Rosh Hashanah. Date according to lunar calendar.
September 30	Day of Atonement	Día del Perdón	Judaism	Yom Kippur. Date according to lunar calendar.
October 2	Islamic New Year	Año Nuevo Islámico	Islam	Date according to lunar calendar.

== Bicentennial holidays ==
As part of the celebration of the Independence Day Bicentennial, the following extraordinary and one-time holidays were arranged:

- February 27, 2012: Bicentenary of the creation of the Flag of Argentina and the first pledge to it.
- September 24, 2012: Bicentenary of the Battle of Tucumán.
- January 31, 2013: Bicentenary of the inaugural session of the Assembly of the Year XIII.
- February 20, 2013: Bicentenary of the Battle of Salta.
- July 9, 2016: Bicentennial of the Argentine Declaration of Independence.

== Other observances ==
- Argentine National Anthem Day (Día del Himno Nacional Argentino) on May 11. Not a holiday.
- Navy Day (Dia de la Armada Argentina) on May 17. Not a holiday.
- May Week (Semana de Mayo) on May 18-24. Not a holiday.
- Army Day (Dia del Ejercito Argentino) on May 29. Not a holiday (but working holiday in the Army).
- Father's Day (Día del Padre) on the third Sunday of June. Not a holiday.
- Friend's Day (Día del Amigo) on July 20. Not a holiday.
- Children's Day (Día de la Niñez) on the third Sunday of August. Not a holiday.
- Teacher's Day (Día del Maestro) on September 11. Anniversary of the death of Domingo Faustino Sarmiento in 1888. School holiday only for primary and high school students.
- Student's Day (Día del Estudiante) on September 21. Holiday only for high school and university students.
- Loyalty Day (Día de la Lealtad) on October 17, the anniversary of the 1945 Peronist-aligned grand rally in downtown Buenos Aires, also Television Day as the first Argentine TV broadcasts aired on this day in 1951. Not a public holiday but observed nationally as a working holiday.
- Mother's Day (Día de la Madre) on the third Sunday of October. Not a holiday.
- Tourist holidays (feriados turísticos) occur on various Mondays and Fridays, as established by the government.
- Tradition Day (Día de la Tradición) on November 10. Anniversary of the birth of José Hernández in 1834. Not a holiday.
