= Chamber of Deputies of Formosa =

Legislative body of Formosa Province, Argentina

Type
- Type: Unicameral

Leadership
- President (Vice Governor): Eber Solís (PJ) since 10 December 2019
- Provisional President: Armando Felipe Cabrera (PJ) since 10 December 2019
- First Vice President: Agustín Samaniego (FAF) since 10 December 2019

Structure
- Seats: 30 legislators
- Political groups: Government (20): Justicialist (20); Opposition (10): Radical Civic Union (7); Floro Eleuterio Bogado (3)
- Length of term: 4 years
- Authority: Constitution of Formosa

Elections
- Voting system: Limited voting Ley de lemas (D'Hondt method)
- Last election: 14 November 2021
- Next election: 2023

Meeting place
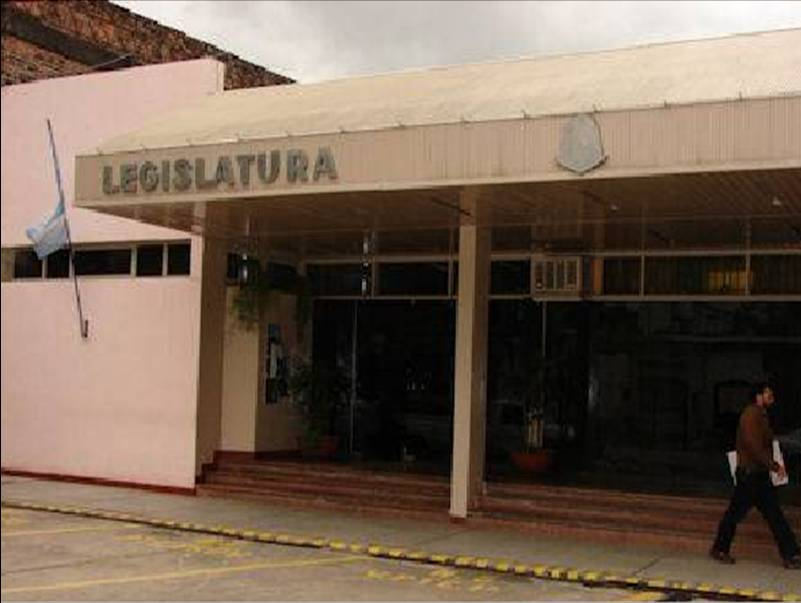
- Legislatura de la Provincia de Formosa, Formosa, Formosa Province

Website
- legislaturaformosa.gov.ar

The Chamber of Deputies of Formosa Province (Spanish: Cámara de Diputados de la Provincia de Formosa) is the unicameral legislative body of Formosa Province, in Argentina. It convenes in the provincial capital, the City of Formosa.

It comprises 30 legislators elected in a single multi-member province-wide district. Members are elected by halves in staggered elections for four-year terms every two years using the limited voting system (similar to that of the Argentine Senate), and using the ley de lemas for party lists, with seats being proportionally allocated to their different sublemas using the D'Hondt method. Under the limited voting system, the list (or lists, as per de ley de lemas) that win the most votes automatically get two thirds of the seats up for grabs, while the second-most voted list gets the remaining third of seats.

The Chamber of Deputies is presided by the vice governor of Formosa, who is elected alongside the governor every four years. Since 2019, the post has been occupied by Eber Solís, elected in the Justicialist Party ticket alongside Governor Gildo Insfrán.

== History ==
The legislative power of Formosa was established upon the adoption of the province's first constitution in 1957, two years after the National Territory of Formosa became a province of Argentina. This first legislature, by the name of Chamber of Deputies, comprised 30 legislators elected by halves every two years for four-year terms, with possibility of re-election.

== Seat ==
The Chamber of Deputies has its seat in the Legislature building, on José M. Uriburu 241, Formosa. An eight-story building by San Martín Square was originally planned during the 1980s, but was never finished.
