= Mario Cámpora =

Argentine diplomat (1930–2022)

Argentine Ambassador to Belgium
- In office 1995–1999

Ambassador of Argentina to the United Kingdom
- In office 1990–1994
- Preceded by: Carlos Ortiz de Rozas
- Succeeded by: Rogelio Pfirter

Secretary of Foreign Affairs
- In office 1989–1990
- Preceded by: Juan Archibaldo Lanús
- Succeeded by: Juan Carlos Olima

Personal details
- Born: Mario Alberto Cámpora; 3 August 1930; Mendoza, Argentina
- Died: 13 January 2022 (aged 91); Buenos Aires, Argentina

Mario Alberto Cámpora (3 August 1930 – 13 January 2022) was an Argentine diplomat. He served as Argentine Ambassador to the United Kingdom from 1990 to 1994 and to Belgium from 1995 to 1999. Cámpora died in Buenos Aires on 13 January 2022, at the age of 91.

He was a nephew of Héctor José Cámpora, a prominent Peronist leader who briefly served as president of Argentina in 1973.
