= 2024 in Argentina =

- Decades: 2000s; 2010s; 2020s; 2030s
- See also: Other events of 2024; List of years in Argentina

Events in the year 2024 in Argentina.

== Incumbents ==
- President: Javier Milei
- Vice President: Victoria Villarruel

== Health emergencies ==
- 2024 dengue epidemic in Argentina

== Events ==
=== January ===
- January 19: Argentina deports eight Ecuadorians, including relatives of gang leader José Adolfo Macías Villamar, who were arrested on 18 January amid the ongoing conflict in Ecuador.
- January 24: Workers go on a 12-hour strike led by Argentina's largest union, in protest of president Javier Milei's policies.
- January 29: 600 hectares of forest are destroyed by fire in Los Alerces National Park, a UNESCO World Heritage Site in Patagonia.

=== March ===
- March 4: State news agency Télam is closed after 80 years and police surround its offices in Buenos Aires a week after president Milei threatened to close the agency, alleging its use for propaganda by the Peronist opposition.
- March 7: President Milei orders the deployment of federal forces into Rosario to combat drug-related violence following a request from Santa Fe provincial governor Maximiliano Pullaro.
- March 20: Argentina announces a charge against Venezuela before the International Civil Aviation Organization for allegedly violating the Convention on International Civil Aviation after President Nicolás Maduro banned Argentine aircraft from its airspace earlier this month amid traded accusations with President Milei.
- March 27: Argentina orders the deployment of at least two gendarmerie to the Argentine embassy in Venezuela, where allies of opposition leader María Corina Machado take refuge amid more confrontation between the two countries.

=== April ===
- April 5 – The Venezuelan government announces that it will give safe passage to Argentina to six aides of opposition leader María Corina Machado who are taking refuge in the Argentine embassy in Caracas.
- April 16 – Argentina and Denmark sign a 2.1 billion kroner ($300 million) deal for the sale of 24 Royal Danish Air Force F-16 Fighting Falcons to Argentina. No date for the F-16s to be handed over to Argentina has been announced.
- April 24 –
  - Argentina issues an arrest warrant via Interpol for Iranian interior minister Ahmad Vahidi in connection with the 1994 AMIA bombing in Buenos Aires. Vahidi is currently believed to be in Sri Lanka.
  - Tens of thousands march in Buenos Aires against cuts in funding for public universities made by President Milei.

=== May ===
- May 7 – The Central Bank of Argentina releases the highest banknote of the Argentine peso, valued at 10,000 pesos but with a conversion rate of only $11.
- May 9 – Unions launch a general strike against President Milei's planned reforms and budget cuts.
- May 10 – At least 90 people are injured after a seven-car passenger train collides with a locomotive in Palermo, Buenos Aires.
- May 21 – Spain recalls its ambassador in Buenos Aires after President Milei makes disparaging remarks against Spanish Prime Minister Pedro Sánchez and his wife Begoña Gómez during Milei's visit to the country.

=== June ===
- June 12 – Riots break out in Buenos Aires as the Argentine Senate votes 37-36 to provisionally approve President Milei's economic reform package.
- June 28 – The Argentine Chamber of Deputies votes to approve President Milei's economic reform package.

=== July ===
- July 1 – Bolivia summons its ambassador to Argentina after President Milei calls the recent 2024 Bolivian coup attempt "fraudulent" and implies that it was staged.
- July 8 – French rugby players Oscar Jégou and Hugo Auradou are arrested in Buenos Aires on suspicion of raping a woman while the French national rugby team was on tour in Mendoza.
- July 12 – Argentina formally designates Hamas as a terrorist organisation.
- July 14 – Argentina wins its 16th Copa America title following a 1-0 match against Colombia at the 2024 Copa América final held in Miami.
- July 15 – An A-4AR Fightinghawk attack aircraft of the Argentine Air Force crashes in Villa Reynolds Airport, San Luis. The pilot dies after ejecting from the plane at a low altitude.

=== August ===
- 2 August – Argentina recognizes Edmundo González as President-elect of Venezuela, becoming the third country to do so after the United States and Peru.
- 14 August – Former President Alberto Fernández is indicted on charges of making threats and causing bodily harm to former first lady Fabiola Yáñez.
- 16 August - The Argentine Federal Police dismantles an alleged Islamist terrorist organization planning attacks against Jewish community centers in Mendoza.
- 20 August - A Liberia-flagged ship on the Paraná River near Rosario is quarantined after suspected cases of mpox are detected on the ship. The Argentine Health Ministry subsequently activates an emergency protocol against mpox.

=== September ===
- 2 September - President Milei vetoes a bill passed by the Congress to raise the minimum pension.
- 6 September – Venezuelan security forces surround the Argentine embassy in Caracas after several opposition members take refuge inside. Electricity is reportedly cut to the embassy with Vente Venezuela describing the situation as a siege.
- 23 September – A Venezuelan court issues arrest warrants against president Milei, his sister and adviser Karina Milei and Security Minister Patricia Bullrich over the seizure of a Venezuelan aircraft in Buenos Aires due to sanctions violations. The warrant is followed by an arrest order from a federal court in Buenos Aires against Venezuelan President Nicolas Maduro, Interior Minister Diosdado Cabello and several other officials for crimes against humanity.
- 24 September – President Milei proposes an "agenda of freedom" with economic, social, and foreign policies that directly contradict the United Nations' "Pact for the Future", which he calls a model to "repress, restrict and curtail" humanity's freedom and ineffective at preventing conflicts.
- 25 September – Extensive wildfires in Córdoba Province destroy 40,000 hectares (400 km^{2}) of forests and farmland, including several farm structures, and kill large numbers of cattle.

=== October ===
- 2 October –
  - A total solar eclipse occurs over the Argentine Patagonia.
  - Tens of thousands march in Buenos Aires for the second time against cuts in funding for public universities made by President Milei.
- 3 October – President Milei vetoes a bill providing for secure funding for public universities and salary increases for faculty and staff amid nationwide protests.
- 16 October – Singer and former One Direction member Liam Payne dies after falling from the third floor of his hotel room in Palermo, Buenos Aires.
- 17 October - At least 25 campuses of national universities remain took by students as a protest against the defunding of public universities.
- 29 October – The collapse of a 10-story hotel in Villa Gesell ultimately led to 9 deaths, the last one occurring a month later.
- 30 October –
  - President Milei dismisses Diana Mondino as Minister of Foreign Affairs, International Trade and Worship following the country's decision to vote against the United States embargo against Cuba in the United Nations. She is replaced by Argentine ambassador to the US Gerardo Werthein.
  - A nationwide transport strike disrupts services of Trenes Argentinos, the Buenos Aires Underground, and Aerolineas Argentinas among other sectors.

=== November ===
- 9 November – Andrés Bracamonte, the leader of the Rosario Central ultras, is shot dead along with his deputy near Estadio Gigante de Arroyito in Rosario.
- 13 November – President Milei recalls the Argentine delegation to the 2024 United Nations Climate Change Conference in Azerbaijan.
- 14 November – Argentina casts the sole dissenting vote against a nonbinding resolution in the United Nations condemning violence against women and girls.

=== December ===
- 4 December - Edgardo Kueider, member of the Argentine Senate, is arrested when entering Paraguay through the Friendship Bridge with at least USD 200,000 undeclared, prompting a scandal that causes his expulsion of the body days later.
- 8 December - A member of Argentina's National Gendarmerie is arrested when he enters Venezuela on charges of "conspiratorial actions". This sparks a conflict between Venezuela and Argentina's governments, with the Argentine Foreign Ministry rejecting Nahuel Gallo's “arbitrary and unjustified” detention and denouncing Venezuela before the International Criminal Court.
- 19 December – A private aircraft crashes into a residential area in San Fernando, Buenos Aires, killing its two pilots.

== Deaths ==
- January 14 - Enrique Roizner, 84, drummer.
- January 15 - Jorge Griffa, 88, footballer (Newell's Old Boys, Atlético Madrid, national team).
- January 16 - Ottavio Dazzan, 66, Argentine-born Italian Olympic cyclist (1980).
- January 19 - Héctor Bidonde, 86, actor (La Rabona, Alma mía, Chile 672) and stage director.
- February 5 - José Delbo, 90, comic book artist (Wonder Woman, The Transformers).
- February 6 - Cecilia Gentili, 52, Argentine-born American actress (Pose) and LGBTQ activist.
- May 5 - César Luis Menotti, 85, former football player and head coach.
- May 24 - Santiago Omar Riveros, 100, general and convicted criminal.
- October 18 - Ginés González García, 79, physician, diplomat and politician, minister of health (2002–2007, 2019–2021).
- November 23 - Roberto Dromi, 79, politician and lawyer, Minister of Public Works (1989–1991).
- December 9 - Héctor Recalde, 86, lawyer and politician, member of the Argentine Chamber of Deputies (2005–2017).
- December 17 - Beatriz Sarlo, 82, literary and cultural critic.
- December 30 - Jorge Lanata, 64, journalist.

== Art and entertainment ==
- List of 2024 box office number-one films in Argentina
- List of Argentine submissions for the Academy Award for Best International Feature Film
