= Juan Chavetta =

Argentine illustrator and writer (1970–2025)

Juan Chavetta (25 June 1970 – 7 August 2025) was an Argentine illustrator and writer.

== Life and career ==
Chavetta was born in Zárate on 25 June 1970. During his career, he published illustrations for a number of newspapers, including PIN, El Gourmet, Bacanal and Caras y Caretas. He focused on children's literature in the 2000s, including Quipu, Del Naranjo, AZ, Uranito and Olmo.

His most popular character was Puro Pelo, a character he created for a comic book series, inspired by the Japanese kokeshi doll.

== Death ==
Chavetta died of cancer in Zárate on 7 August 2025, at the age of 55.
