= Alberto Neuman =

Argentine pianist (1933–2021)

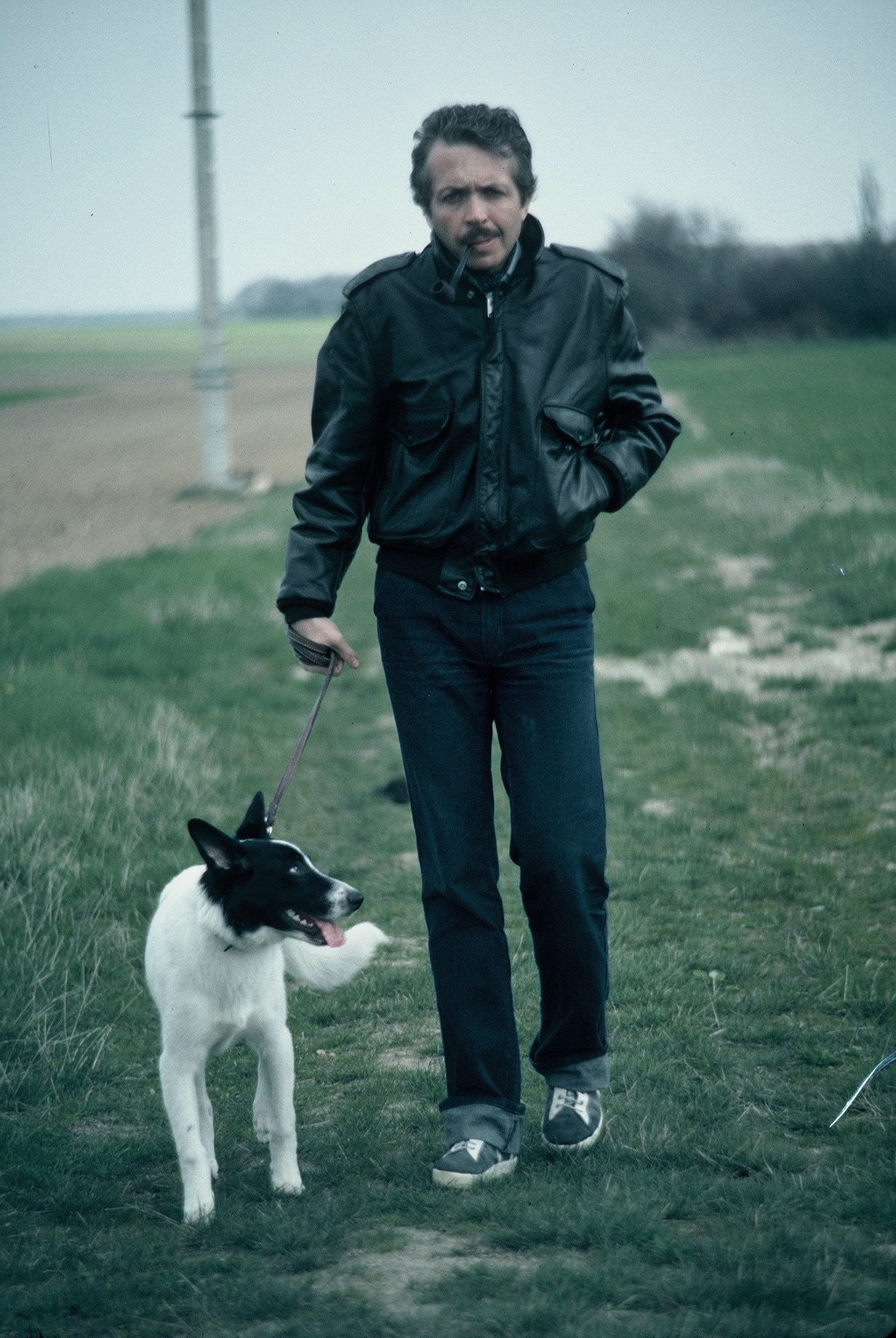
Alberto Neuman

Alberto Neuman (Buenos Aires, 24 November 1933 – Angoulême, 29 January 2021) was an Argentine pianist.

== Career ==
Neuman was born in Buenos Aires. A disciple of Arturo Benedetti Michelangeli, he began his career while a student at the Roma Conservatory. In 1961 he won the international Viotti Piano Competition in Vercelli. He studied also with Carlo Zecchi, Walter Gieseking, Vincenzo Scaramuzza, Galia Schalman and Wilhelm Kempff.

Neuman has been active as a concert pianist mainly in Europe, but has also performed regularly at Japan and Latin America. He was previously a professor at the Paris Conservatoire Supérieur and at the Conservatoire d'Angoulême. Alberto Neuman is often seen as a foremost representative of Argentinian culture in Europe : "Comment serait Paris aujourd'hui, s'il lui manquait les échos du bandonéon de Piazzolla, sans la voix d'Atahualpa Yupanqui, sans les pièces de Lavelli ou d'Arias, sans les claviers de Martha Argerich ou d'Alberto Neuman, sans les figures peintes par Le Parc, sans les portraits laissés par Cortazar, sans la présence constante dans l'air parisien de la prose et des vers de Borges, sans le tango ?"

== Discography ==
- Noblesse du Tango – Arion ARN 36 299 (1975) (LP) (France) – works by Igor Stravinski, Isaac Albéniz, Juan José Castro, Juan-Francisco Giacobbe, Darius Milhaud, Alberto Ginastera, Erik Satie, Astor Piazzolla, Alberto Neuman (1975)
- Tango Perpétuel – BUDA Musique BCD 92630-2 (1995) (CD) (France) – works by Ernesto Nazareth, Juan José Castro, Igor Stravinsky, Gerardo Hernán Matos-Rodríguez, Astor Piazzolla, Ernesto Baffa, Alberto Ginastera, Kurt Weill, Darius Milhaud, Jacob Gades, Alberto Neuman, Isaac Albéniz, Maurice Ohana, Giacomo Puccini, Erik Satie (1995)
- Tango Perpétuel II – BUDA Musique BCD 92651-2 (1996) (CD) (France) – works by Bohuslav Martinu, Gerardo Hernán Matos-Rodríguez, Astor Piazzolla, Ernesto Nazareth, Tom Johnson, Vladimir Cosma, Ernesto Baffa, Alberto Neuman, Scott Joplin, Juan Francisco Giacobbe, Alberto Ginastera (1996)
- Mario Bertoncini : Mario Bertoncini – Edition RZ LP-1002 (1989) (LP) (Germany) – works by Mario Bertoncini, Earle Brown et John Cage (Alberto Neuman avec Mario Bertoncini et Maura Cova, pour trois pianos préparés (1970)
- Mikis Theodorakis : Canto General
- Nagaokakyo Chamber Ensemble / Yuko Mori: Orient & Occident – HYBRID Disc SACD NF60104 (2003) (CD) (Japan)
