= Omar Moreno Palacios =

Argentine folk singer (1938–2021)

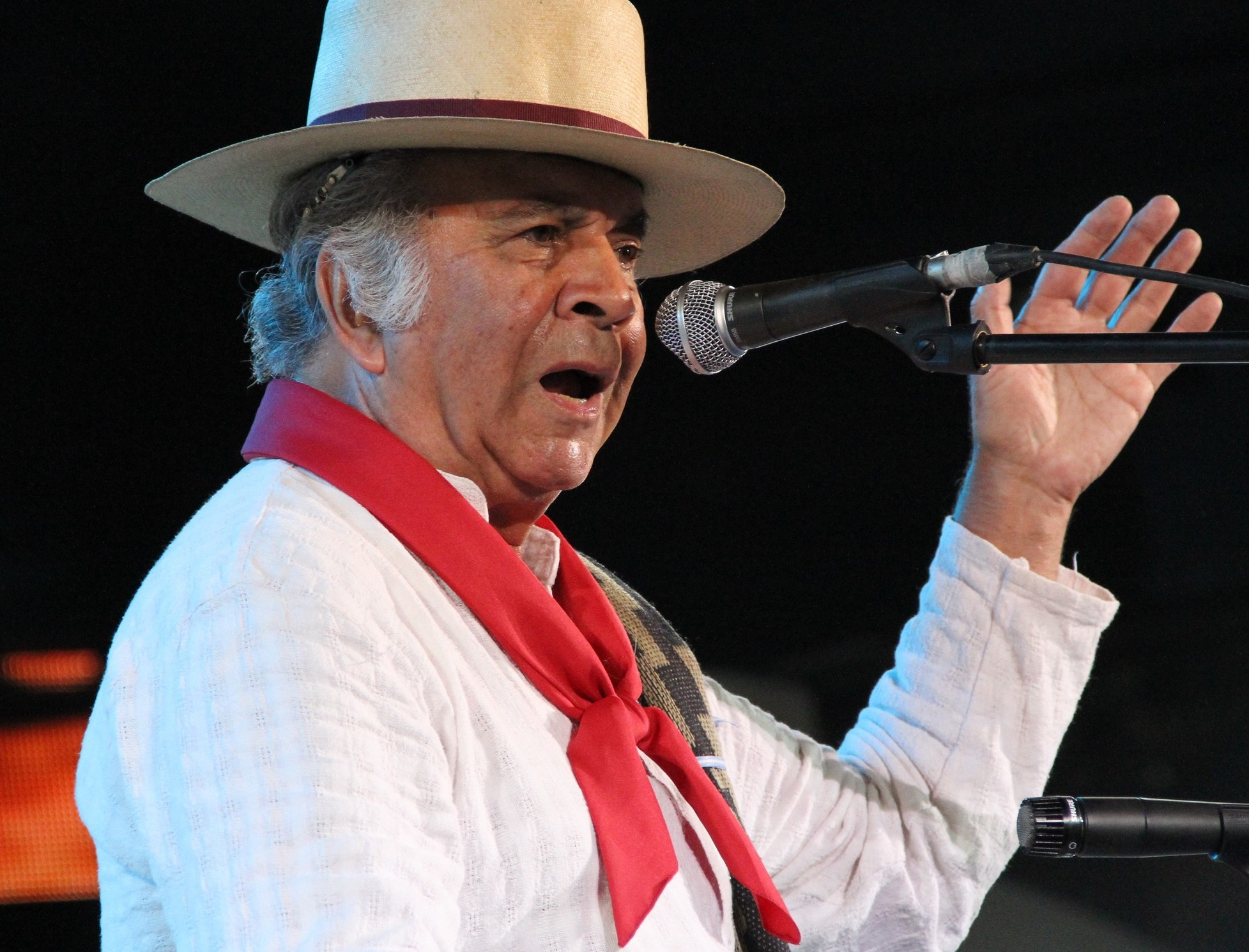
Omar Moreno Palacios, 2013

Omar Moreno Palacios (5 September 1938 Chascomús, Buenos Aires – 17 February 2021, Buenos Aires) was an Argentine folk singer-songwriter, guitarist, and gaucho. He died from an encephalitis.
