= Taty Almeida =

Argentine human rights activist (1930–2026)

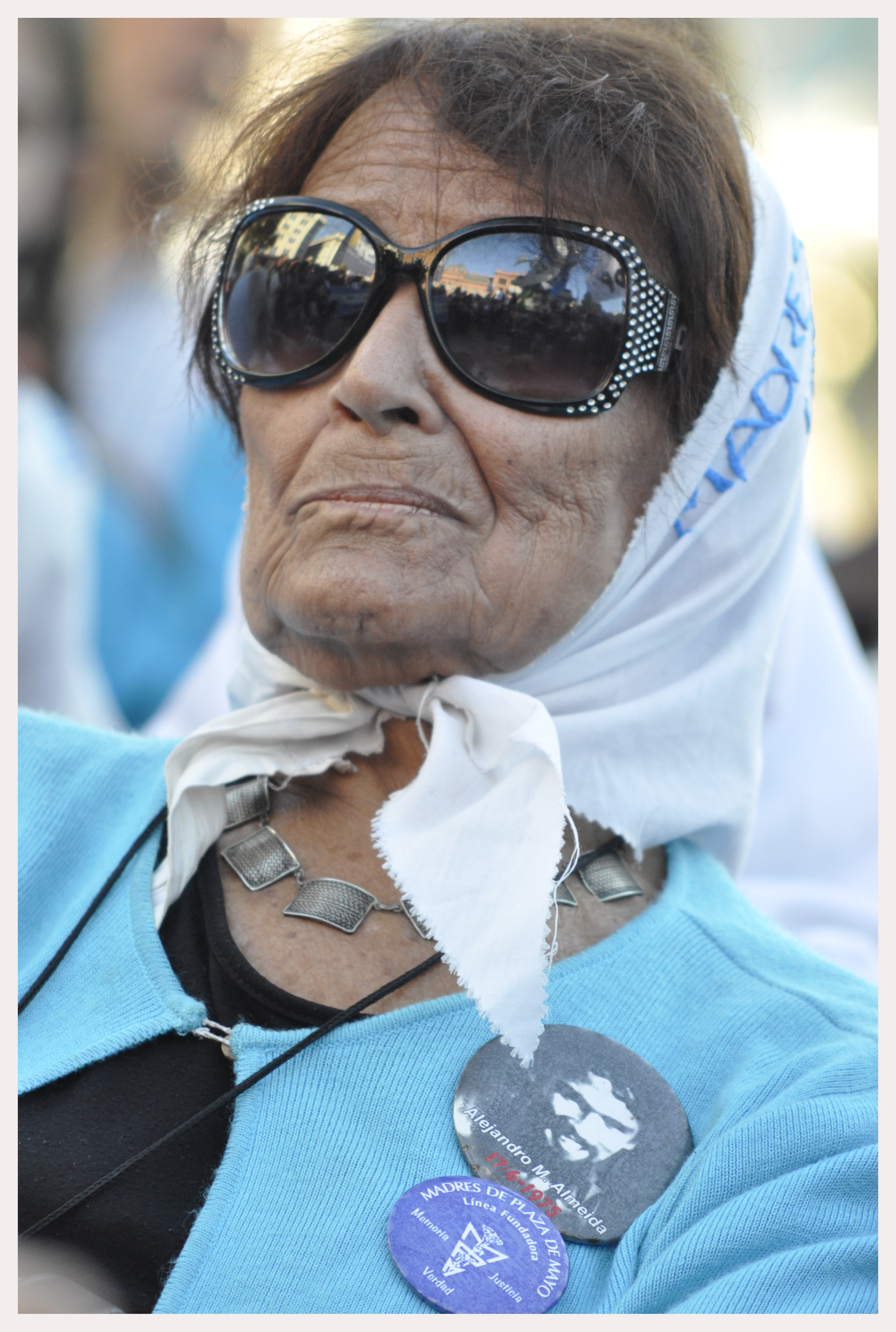
- Taty Almeida in 2013
- Born: Lidia Stella Mercedes Miy Uranga; 28 June 1930; Belgrano, Buenos Aires, Argentina
- Died: 14 June 2026 (aged 95); Buenos Aires, Argentina

Lidia Stella Mercedes Miy Uranga (28 June 1930 – 14 June 2026), better known as Taty Almeida, was an Argentine teacher and human rights activist. She was a member of Madres de Plaza de Mayo Línea Fundadora, the founding lineage of the Mothers of Plaza de Mayo.

== Background ==
Lidia Stella Mercedes Miy Uranga was born on 28 June 1930 in the Belgrano neighborhood of Buenos Aires to Alicia Uranga and cavalry officer Carlos Vidal Miy. Her uncle, Raúl Uranga, was governor of Entre Ríos during the presidency of Arturo Frondizi. She had three sisters and one brother: Her brother was a colonel, and her sisters married aeronautics officers.

Her childhood was spent in the province of Mendoza and Buenos Aires. She studied teaching at the Escuela Normal Superior N° 7 in the Buenos Aires neighborhood of Almagro. She taught for a few years.

She married a fellow teacher, Jorge Almeida, in 1953. The couple had three children: Jorge, Alejandro and Fabiana. Almeida died at a Buenos Aires hospital on 14 June 2026, at the age of 95.

== Activism ==
On 17 June 1975, her 20-year-old son, Alejandro Almeida, was kidnapped by the right-wing paramilitary organization Triple A. In 1979, she learned about the Mothers of Plaza de Mayo and decided to join them. She participated in countless protests at Plaza de Mayo. As part of the collective of Mothers of Plaza de Mayo Founding Line, she gave interviews and talks, and attended conferences and other events.

In 2008, she published Alejandro, por siempre… amor (English: Alejandro, forever… love), a book which compiles stories, memories, and 24 poems written by Alejandro.

In 2011, the Legislature of the City of Buenos Aires declared her an Outstanding Human Rights Personality.

In 2015, a portrait of her was installed in the permanent exhibition of the Bicentennial Museum located behind the Casa Rosada .
