= Aldo Monges =

Argentinian singer (1942–2025)

insert a caption here

Aldo Monges (Spanish: [ˈalðo ˈmoŋxes]; 17 January 1942 – 19 July 2025) was an Argentine folk singer, popularly known as El Trovador Romántico.

== Life and Career ==
Monges was born in Córdoba 17 January 1942.

He participated as a musical performer in two films: La carpa del amor and Los éxitos del amor, both from 1979. His song Canción para una mentira, from his first album, obtained considerable diffusion at that time, a success that was used for a long time as a musical curtain in the popular television program "Argentinísima" by Julio Mahárbiz.

Among his hits, mostly from the 1970s, one could mention Brindo por tu cumpleaños, Qué voy a hacer con este amor and Olvídame muchacha, among other songs.

== Death ==
Monges died in Buenos Aires on 19 July 2025, after going through a prolonged period of illness, at the age of 83.
