= Tico Rodríguez Paz =

Argentine journalist (1940–2025)

Jacinto "Tico" Rodríguez Paz (Spanish: [xaˈsinto ˈtiko roðˈɾiɣes ˈpas]; August 4, 1940 – August 8, 2025) was an Argentine radio announcer, television news anchor and journalist.

== Early life and career ==
Rodríguez was born on August 4, 1940. Throughout his career, he was linked to Channel 13 in Buenos Aires. He worked alongside a number of journalists including Mónica Cahen D'Anvers and César Mascetti and on several newscasts including "Buenas noches, Argentina" (1981). He also worked for Radio Splendid and TV Pública.

== Death ==
In July 2025, Rodríguez contracted pneumonia that, although overcome, was the basis for a complication due to a virus and urinary tract infection. He had also been suffering from Alzheimer's disease. He died on August 8, 2025, at the age of 85.
