= Brenda Agüero =

Argentine serial killer (born 1995)

- Born: Brenda Cecilia Agüero; 2 June 1995 (age 31); Buenos Aires, Argentina
- Occupation: Nurse
- Status: Incarcerated
- Convictions: Murder (5 counts), attempted murder (8 counts)
- Penalty: Life imprisonment

Details
- Span of crimes: 18 March 2022 – 6 June 2022
- Country: Argentina
- Date apprehended: 20 August 2022

Brenda Cecilia Agüero (born 2 June 1995) is an Argentine serial killer and former neonatal nurse convicted of the murder of five babies under her care.

Between March and June 2022, Agüero deliberately injected healthy babies with overdoses of potassium or insulin (or both), killing five and causing decompensations in eight others.

Agüero was charged with five counts of "aggravated murder for applying the insidious method of potassium incompatible with life". Agüero was later charged with eight other counts of attempted murder.

The trial against Agüero and 10 provincial officials began on 6 January 2025.

On 18 June 2025, Agüero was found guilty of all charges and sentenced to life in prison.

== Early life ==
On 20 August 2022, police announced the arrest of Brenda Cecilia Agüero (born 2 June 1995 in Buenos Aires); a nurse who worked in the neonatal unit and who had been among the suspended personnel during the initial investigation. Agüero lived with her mother and two sisters in the outskirts of Río Ceballos at the time of her arrest.

Agüero graduated as a nurse with excellent results in 2018 and moved to Córdoba, where she worked at a private hospital between 2019 and December 2020, when she resigned to keep her only job at the Ramón Castillo Neonatal Hospital. Agüero denied the accusations and abstained from testifying.

Days after her arrest, Agüero was formally charged with five counts of "aggravated murder for applying the insidious method of potassium incompatible with life" and eight counts of attempted murder. Agüero later accused a colleague of hers of the deaths, saying that this male nurse was present where the deaths occurred "all the time".

During the legal proceedings, Agüero was incarcerated at the Bouwer prison in inner Córdoba, where she was isolated from other inmates to protect her from harm.

=== Psychological profile ===
Prior to the trial, the court ordered further psychological assessment for Agüero. The evaluating professionals determined that Agüero has a "self-centered personality", and that she seeks "recognition, power, and admiration", plus "lack of empathy and affection, with expressions of satisfaction from close contact with another person's suffering".

The mental health professionals also found that Agüero has traits of a dissociative personality disorder, with one side of her personality being completely aware of reality, while the other side denies said reality and compensates for it with the production of her wishes. The same professionals stated that these traits are "typical mechanisms of a psychopathic personality".

During the trial, further testimony was presented by mental health professionals. Psychologist Martínez Goyena said that Agüero does not suffer from any active mental health disorder, and that she is capable of understanding reality. Further analysis showed narcissistic, self-referential, and psychopathic traits. Defense psychiatrist Quiroga said, in contrast, that there are no previous indicators that Agüero could have psychopathic features in her personality.

Multiple mental health professionals testified on 18 February that Agüero seeks "visibility" for her crimes, as well as repeating pre-trial examination findings that she lacks empathy, citing the total reluctance by Agüero to acknowledge the suffering of the families of the murdered babies. Professionals also testified on Agüero's unhealthy relationship with her mother, which the psychologists labeled as "not common". Other evidence was photos from her cell phone, which included images of animals treated like human babies, Agüero herself showing her belly, and images of hospitalized children.

== Investigation ==
Between March and June 2022, unusually high infant mortality rates occurred at a neonatal nursing unit in the Ramón Castillo Neonatal Hospital in Córdoba, Argentina. A series of investigations initially pointed to a hospital-acquired infection or malpractice.

The provincial government then intervened at the Ramón Castillo Neonatal Hospital after these reports of healthy babies dying without cause. Prosecutor Raúl Garzón labelled the case as "enormously grave" but initially insisted that they could have been either cases of malpractice or hospital-acquired infections, and no accusations were made. Nonetheless, Garzón ordered a search warrant on the hospital and relieved twenty employees from their duties.

Police and prosecutors began to suspect that there had been foul play when no more deaths occurred after the suspension of those twenty employees. On the same day that the hospital was searched, authorities suspended the head of the hospital. The investigation was prompted by a doctor who refused to sign the death certificates of two healthy babies who died on the same day in June 2022; allegedly the two last babies to die from an external cause (murder).

As the search warrant was served, the prosecution asked for the exhumation of the remains of the deceased babies, whose autopsies showed abnormal levels of potassium, which medical investigators attributed to being deliberately injected into the babies, as said levels of potassium are not normally produced by the body. Further investigations showed that the babies had not been injected with the potassium via IV method, but instead, that they had received the injections in their backs and with clothes on while they were in the resuscitation room.

On the same day that police announced the arrest of nurse Brenda Agüero, the minister of health of Córdoba, Diego Cardozo, resigned from his position after heavy criticism for his handling of the case. Cardozo said that he had presented his resignation with the goal of helping clarify and serve justice in the case. Governor Juan Schiaretti assigned the ministry to María Gabriela Barbás.

In February 2023, the head of the hospital, 70-year-old Liliana Asís, was arrested and accused of concealing the unnatural deaths of the babies from the authorities. She was granted house arrest in May 2023 due to her deteriorating health while in prison. Along with Asís, more officials and local politicians were indicted for either concealment or wrongdoing.

=== Hospital report ===
After the hospital was intervened, the nursing personnel decided to conduct their investigation, tracing clinical reports, inventory of pharmacological drugs, and the shifts taken by each nurse during the span of the deaths. Among the discoveries, the head of the pharmacy of the hospital found that there was a faulty report on 20 vials of potassium for the month of June, when three of the deaths occurred. Other nursing personnel reported that Brenda Agüero was raising suspicions among the nurses because of her odd behavior interacting with others, including that she volunteered to undress babies for their routine check-up. This task was assigned to another nurse, and not to Agüero. Her colleagues also reported to police that Agüero usually dressed in long sleeves, including on hot summer days, coinciding with the prosecution's accusation.

=== Criminological profile of the killer ===
In February 2025, a group of criminologists from the Judicial Police presented a report on the deaths of the babies, assuring that they were a part of "serial criminality", and not accidental or natural deaths. The report stated that the perpetrator had access to the restricted unit of the neonatal unit, where most of the attacks occurred. It also said that the killer had access to medications, with a professional and medical knowledge of the handling of these drugs, and whose presence in the restricted unit would not raise any suspicion, for which their presence was justified. The report concluded that the perpetrator selected "extremely vulnerable" victims who did not pose any resistance, for which they sought the perfect moment to inject an external agent into their bodies with the intent to cause harm and death.

Further profiling was presented on 16 February by a medical professor and a social worker. They indicated that the perpetrator would not have stopped killing if they would have been detained. The report further stated that there could have probably been a "cooling period", before undoubtedly continuing to kill.

== Pre-trial proceedings ==
The first evidence that the prosecution introduced against Agüero, was immediately after her arrest, alleging that Agüero was behind every case, both deaths and decompensations, and that Agüero herself was in the place of the incidents, further alleging that she was the one who notified the doctors and other medical personnel that an emergency with a newborn was underway. On the same day that the prosecution introduced their first accusation, the court in charge of the pre-trial procedures, ordered psychiatric and psychological evaluations of Agüero, to later dictate pre-trial detention.

In January 2023, the psychiatric evaluators determined that Agüero knows right from wrong and that she does not suffer from any mental disorder. The psychiatrists further argued that Agüero tried to "manipulate the interview" and that she has difficulties in regards to feeling what others do. After the evaluation, Agüero's indictment was confirmed.

The prosecution alleged that in November 2021, Agüero searched on Google "how to dose potassium and insulin injections in newborns." Agüero denied that she searched "how to apply potassium injections" on Google and alleged that she does not have the knowledge to perform such a procedure.

Another accusation argued that Agüero concealed the syringes with which she allegedly injected the babies with potassium, under her sleeves, with other medical personnel noting that she went to work with long-sleeved shirts even on hot summer days. According to prosecutor Garzón, Agüero did so as a modus operandi while she visited the resuscitation room with the newborns in her arms. In April 2023, the prosecution added the testimony of the mother of one of the babies who survived the assault. The woman personally accused Agüero and placed her at the side of her baby when the baby decompensated.

On 9 August 2023, prosecutor Garzón said that the investigation had entered "its final phase," adding that his office had received reports of two other suspicious deaths of babies. Garzón also said that before going to trial, the prosecution would add more testimonies and witness evidence.

On 23 August 2023, the prosecution released the results of the investigation of Agüero's cellphone, where investigators found nine PDF files. Among the nine files, the prosecution said that information was found on how to dose potassium, information related to cardiac arrests, numerous pages of neonatal medications, CPR manuals, and an article on how medical personnel should react to families grieving a newborn. Agüero's defense argued that these files were not downloaded by Agüero herself, but instead, sent to her via WhatsApp.

In September 2023, the prosecution added the analysis by a team of criminal profilers who determined that the killings were acts of serial murder and that a single perpetrator was behind them. Without mentioning Agüero, prosecutor Garzón said that the analysis will be a key to the case, because the profilers also pointed to a person with access to the babies and who did not initially raise any suspicion.

In late September 2023, prosecutor Raúl Garzón petitioned for the case to be taken to court for trial. The defense of Brenda Agüero announced that they would appeal the petition.

== Trial ==
On 9 May 2024, control Judge Juan Manuel Fernández López rejected Agüero's appeals against the prosecution's petition to take her to trial, and ordered that she stand trial on five counts of aggravated murder, as well as eight other counts of attempted murder. Along with Agüero, Judge Fernández López also ordered that 10 officials face trial at the same courtroom where Agüero will be tried.

The trial against Brenda Agüero and the other ten defendants commenced on 6 January 2025. Agüero denied committing the crimes during her first testimony, saying that there is "no possibility that harming another person crosses my mind; much less a child."

On 22 January, the mother of one of the babies who decompensated (a baby girl named Isabella) testified that she saw Agüero injecting her baby while the little girl was in the cradle. The woman said that the baby cried as Agüero injected her shortly before decompensating.

On 30 January, medical professionals testified at the trial, saying that the babies did not die from a natural cause, and confirmed that the levels of potassium or insulin in their bodies were injected deliberately.

On 4 February, a neonatal doctor testified that during her shift on 6 June 2022, when two healthy babies died without presumptive cause, she saw Brenda Agüero with a baby in her arms, and that Agüero told her that the baby "was not well". The baby later died from a serious case of bradycardia. The doctor also confirmed that the nature of the deaths of these healthy babies raised suspicions from the doctors who attempted to resuscitate them.

On 26 February, Agüero's sisters Natalia Agüero and Celeste Severín gave an impact testimony, saying that they do not believe their sister is a murderer, and asked for her acquittal. Natalia Agüero highlighted Brenda's upbringing with their parents and the impact that their divorce had on her. She also told of their time in Buenos Aires and then back in Río Ceballos and how Brenda allegedly dedicated herself to her job. Celeste Severín said that her sister is a perejil (lit. parsley) which is Argentinian slang for "fool", and was allowed to hug Brenda before exiting the courtroom.

On 10 March, the Homicides Division of Córdoba Police presented another report accusing Agüero of being the only person with an "active participation" in every case. The investigators highlighted that in the case of 1 May 2022 (baby G.H.), Agüero predicted that the baby would decompensate, even when the baby was healthy and without any complications.

On 11 March, the prosecution presented a series of photographs taken from Agüero's cell phone. The court chose three of those for evaluation by psychologists and psychiatrists: one photo of babies in incubators, another picture of a vial of vitamin K, and a third picture that showed the hand of a baby with three red spots on it. Said evaluators found that the pictures relate closely to Agüero's psychopathic personality, especially under the lack of empathy shown to the families of the victims.

On 15 April, Agüero began her final statement before the court, where she denied committing the murders. Agüero insisted that she "never harmed any person, much less a baby."

On 30 April, the prosecution formally requested the sentence of life imprisonment for Agüero, accusing her of deliberately injecting the babies with potassium and insulin to gain the attention of the medical staff when she attempted to resuscitate them.

On 8 May, Agüero's defense lawyer gave the final statement before the court, saying that Agüero is innocent and that she was framed by "the power" (in reference to the provincial government) to blame her for the negligence of providing expired medications and concealing systematic malpractice among the hospital's medical personnel. Agüero's defense counsel later concluded his statement formally requesting the jury to acquit Agüero of all charges.

In their final impact statement before the court, the mothers of the murdered babies accused Agüero and her lawyers of falsely implying that they "cried for money" (in relation to civil trials against the provincial government) and also demanded that Agüero be sentenced to life in prison.

Agüero gave her final statement on 12 June, with the verdict expected for 18 June. Agüero denied the charges again, and in a tense moment in court, accused the mothers of the babies of being "scripted", prompting emotional reactions from the gallery. Agüero, in part, said:

It hurt me a lot to see the mothers of the deceased babies with a little piece of paper. You say "your child died", I don't know where is the need to script them. I am sorry, but I found that shocking. This never happened to me and I hope that I will never have to live it again, but all the script... no, no. Whatever happens, I am absolutely in peace. I never did anything to those children. I don't know how to say this again, I don't know how many times. I am innocent of what I am being accused of. You don't have any serial killer here. I love children.

On 18 June, previous to the verdict, Agüero's parents released a statement calling for their daughter's acquittal, saying (against medical evidence) that the babies were "not healthy" and that they "died for other causes."

Hours later, the jury returned a verdict of guilty on all counts and sentenced her to life in prison.

=== Defendants ===
Aside from Agüero, who is being tried as the sole person responsible for the murders, provincial and hospital officials are on trial for their alleged failure to inform authorities of the deaths of healthy babies. Among the officials are the former Health Minister of Córdoba, Diego Cardozo, the former head of the hospital, Liliana Asís, as well as several hospital personnel, including the head of the nursing department, Blanca Alicia Ariza, the head of the neonatal unit, Marta Gómez, and other doctors and politicians.

== Incarceration ==
In January 2026, Agüero's lawyer Gustavo Nievas, submitted an emergency request to the courts asking for protective custody for Agüero. Nievas informed the judge, the penitentiary service and media, that Agüero was assaulted in September 2025 and who recently was threatened with a knife by prisoners convicted of bloodless crimes who do not share Agüero's criminal profile, with Nievas highlighting her as a "weak woman" and nonviolent. The request was accepted that same day.

== Victims ==
The following list is the cases of either deaths or decompensations for which Agüero was convicted.

Table of charges
Count	Baby	Charge	Date of death/collapse	Mechanism
1	V.U.M.	Attempted murder	18 March 2022	Potassium chloride poisoning
2	Francisco Calderón	Murder	18 March 2022	Potassium chloride poisoning
3	Benjamín Luna	Murder	23 April 2022	Undetermined method of poisoning. Probably potassium
4	F.A.B.	Attempted murder	24 April 2022	Potassium chloride poisoning
5	L.C.H.	Attempted murder	24 April 2022	Potassium chloride poisoning
6	I.V.F.	Attempted murder	26 April 2022	Potassium chloride poisoning
7	G.H.	Attempted murder	1 May 2022	Potassium chloride poisoning
8	J.E.L.	Attempted murder	11 May 2022	Insulin poisoning
9	Ibrahim B. Guardia	Murder	23 May 2022	Undetermined method. Probably insulin poisoning
10	Angeline C. Rojas	Murder	6 June 2022	Potassium chloride poisoning
11	Melody Luz Molina	Murder	6 June 2022	Potassium chloride poisoning
12	M.E.T.	Attempted murder	6 June 2022	Insulin and potassium chloride poisoning
13	D.P.M.	Attempted murder	6 June 2022	Potassium chloride poisoning
