= Miguel Ángel De Marco =

Argentine navy officer, historian and academic (1939–2026)

Miguel Ángel De Marco (1 December 1939 – 6 April 2026) was an Argentine military officer, academic and historian.

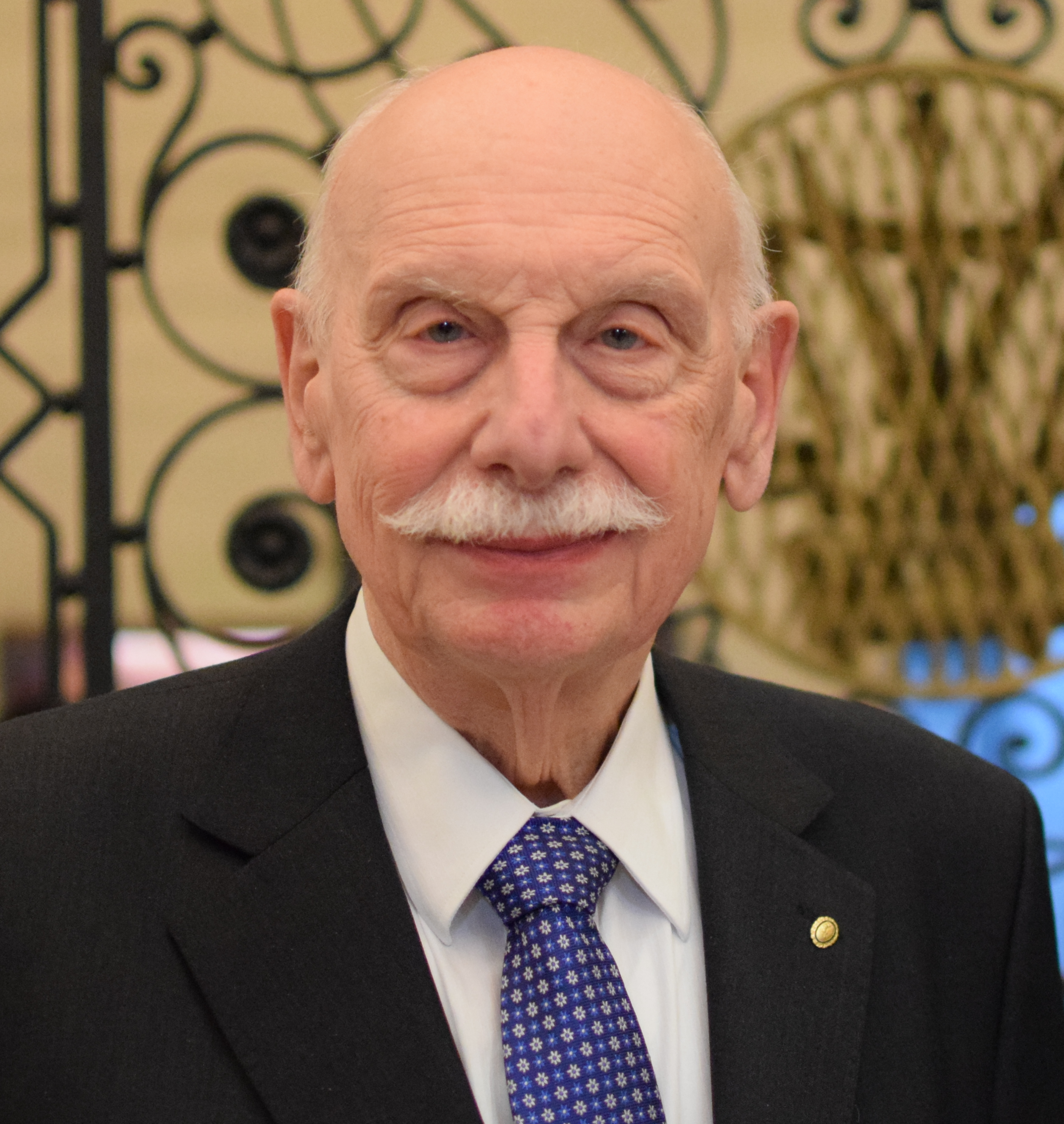
De Marco in 2019

== Life and career ==
Miguel Ángel De Marco was born in Rosario on 1 December 1939. He served in the Argentine Navy, reaching the rank of Comodoro.

He was an academic, and later president for three terms, of the National Academy of History of the Argentine Republic; he was also a member of the San Martin National Institute, and correspondent of the Royal Academy of History of Spain, the Royal Hispanic American Academy of Cadiz, the Portuguese Academy of History, the Academy of Marinha de Portugal and of almost all the national academies of Ibero-America. He was director of the Department of History and the Institute of Argentine and American History at the Pontifical Catholic University of Argentina, as well as a professor at the University of El Salvador, where he later became professor emeritus with a Doctorate in History.

Throughout his life, he produced a number of books related to Argentine history.

De Marco died on 6 April 2026, at the age of 86.

== Distinctions ==
- In 2014 he received the Konex Award.
- On 26 October 2017, he was distinguished with the honorary hierarchy of Comodoro de Marina by the deputy head of the Argentine Navy, Vice Admiral Miguel Ángel Máscolo.
