= Juan Archibaldo Lanús =

Argentine diplomat

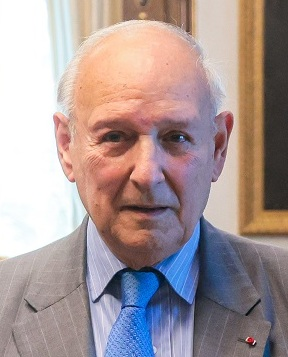

Argentine Ambassador to France
- In office 1995–2000
- In office 2002–2006

Secretary of Foreign Affairs
- In office 1989–1989

Personal details
- Born: Juan Archibaldo Lanús; 1938 (age 87–88)

Juan Archibaldo Lanús (born 1938) is an Argentine diplomat and professor. He served as Argentine Ambassador to France from 1994 to 2000 and again from 2002 to 2006. He also served of Argentina to representative to UNESCO from 2002 to 2003.

Also briefly served as Secretary of Foreign Affairs between July and September 1989 during the presidency of Carlos Menem. He was the author of many books about Foreign relations of Argentina, the most known De Chapultapec al Beagle published in 1984.

He was graduated at Law of the University of Buenos Aires, where he was professor, and then join the foreign Argentine service.

He is Commander of the Legion of Honour.
