= Pedro Rubens David =

Argentine magistrate (1929–2022)

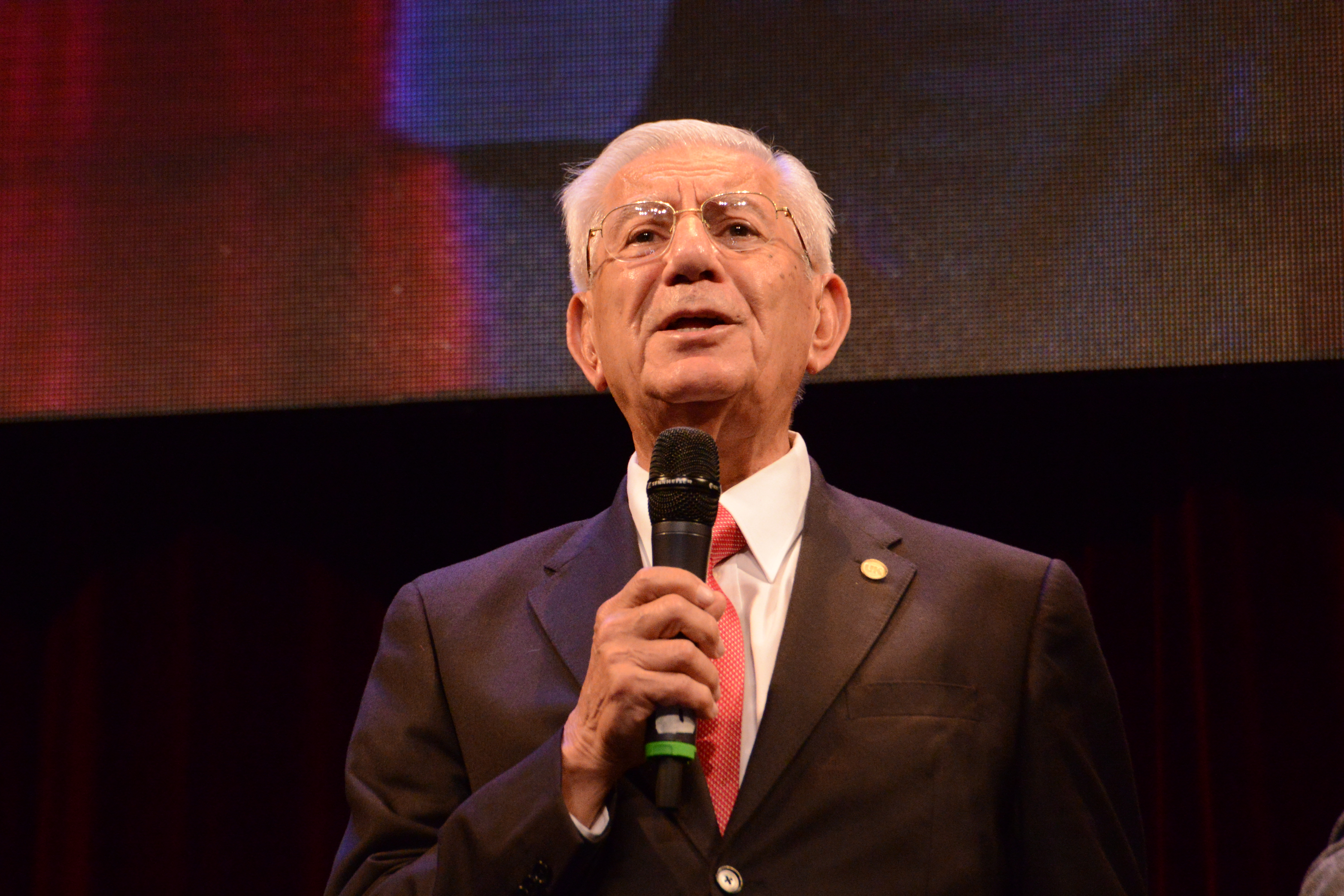
Portrait of Pedro R. David.

Pedro R. David (21 July 1929 – 19 January 2022) was an Argentine magistrate.

David was born in Villa Clodomiro Hileret, Tucumán, Argentina on 21 July 1929. He was first deputy-president of Courtroom II of the Federal Court of Criminal Appeals (Cámara de Casación). David is a lawyer (UNT – University of Tucumán), doctor in sociology (Indiana University Bloomington, USA), doctor in law and social sciences (UNT) and doctor in political sciences (UK –University John F. Kennedy). He was also a judge Ad-Litem at the United Nations International Criminal Tribunal for the former Yugoslavia, The Hague, The Netherlands, and he specialized in research areas, such as crime prevention, victimology and corruption. He founded the University John F. Kennedy and held positions in various universities here: Buenos Aires University, University John F. Kennedy, University of Morón, National University of Salta and National University of Tucumán, and abroad: The University of Hull (England), State University of New Mexico and the University of Zulia (Venezuela). David wrote 18 books and published almost 100 articles. He died on 19 January 2022, at the age of 92.

== Biography ==
Born in 1929 in the province of Tucumán, at age 20 David graduated magna cum laude from the School of Law of the university located in his birthplace. He did a postgraduate degree in Law at the National University of Tucumán, a doctorate in Sociology at Indiana University, and another in Political Science at the John F. Kennedy University.

David was one of the founders of University John F. Kennedy and held academic positions at the National University of Salta, the National University of Tucumán, the University of Buenos Aires, the University of Morón, the University of New Mexico, the State University of Mexico and Indiana University, United States.

== Background ==
Former assistant district attorney, advocate for minors, judge of the Labor Appeal Court and judge of the Honorable Supreme Court of Justice of Salta.2. In 1974 he was judge of the National Criminal and Correctional Court of Appeals of Buenos Aires.

From 2005 to 2011, he was judge at the United Nations International Criminal Tribunal for the former Yugoslavia, The Hague. He was an advisor at the UN to evaluate the work of the International Criminal Tribunal for Rwanda. 2 In 2012 he was appointed President of the Federal Court of Criminal Appeals (Casación). He has been judge of the Federal Court of Criminal Appeals (Casación) since its creation in 1992. He has wide experience in topics related to criminal law, victimology and corruption. He has been a judge in the trials of crimes against humanity during the Argentinian military dictatorship of 1976 . His work is quoted in bibliography of the matter as relevant. He is a member of the Crimes Against Humanity Initiative Advisory Council, a project of the Whitney R. Harris World Law Institute at Washington University School of Law in St. Louis to establish the world's first treaty on the prevention and punishment of crimes against humanity.

== Bibliography ==
1. Victims of Crime and Abuse of Power, Festschrift for Irene Melup, Edurdo Vetere y Pedro R. David (Eds.), Bangkok, 11th UN Congress on Crime Prevention and Criminal Justice, April 2005, 537 ps.
2. Suspensión del Juicio a Prueba, Perspectivas y Experiencias de la Probation en la Argentina y en el Mundo, Pedro R. David and Brian Fellowes, Lexis Nexis, Depalma, 254 pages, Buenos Aires, Argentina, October 2003
3. Globalization, Crime Prevention and Criminal Justice. Ed. De Zavalía., 1999. 804 pages, Buenos Aires, Argentina. Also presented in Italy as "Globalizzazione Prevenzione del Delito e Giustizia Penale"; the presentation took place in the Centre di Studi Latinoamericani, CNR - Università di Roma ´Tor Vergata´, with the collaboration of the Istituto Italo-Latino Americano (IILA) and with the Associazione di Studi Sociali Latino - Americani (ASSLA), April 10, 2000. Professors: Giovanni M. Flick, Guido Neppi Modona, Vincenzo Scordamaglia and Cesare Mirabelli. Ed. Giuffrè, in the collection Giustizia Penale e Problemi Internazionali, managed by Dr. Mario Pisani, Milano, 2001.
4. Compilación, organización e introducción. La sociología de Herrera Figueroa (with other authors: Castiglione, Julio César; Rivas, José A.; Ves Losada, Alfredo), Plus Ultra, Buenos Aires, Argentina, September 2000, 140 ps.
5. Crime and criminal policy, "Criminal Crime and policy", comp. and ed., volume honoring Prof. Dr. Manuel Lopez Rey, United Nations Social Research Institute (in English, Spanish, French and Italian), Franco Angeli, Rome, Italy, 1985, 947 ps
6. La iuspsicología de Herrera Figueroa, comp. and ed. with others, Ed. Leuka, Buenos Aires, Argentina, 1984, 203 ps.
7. Migración, desarrollo, delito, with A. Sánchez Galindo and Miguel Lucero Palma, Universidad de Ciudad Juárez, Mexico, 1982, 308 ps.
8. Sociología Jurídica, Astrea, Buenos Aires, Argentina, 1980, 280 ps.
9. Estructura social y criminología, Universidad del Zulia, Maracaibo, Venezuela, 1979, 189 ps.
10. Criminología y sociedad, Pensamiento Jurídico, Buenos Aires, Argentina, 1978, 250 ps.
11. El mundo del delincuente, 1ª ed., Astrea, Buenos Aires, Argentina, 1976, 255 ps.; in Spanish The World of the Burglar, Ed. Astrea, Buenos Aires, 1979, 255 pages. 2ª ed., Zavalía, Buenos Aires, Argentina, May 2000.
12. The World of the Burglar. 1974, University of New Mexico Press, Albuquerque, NM, 276 pages.
13. Sociologia Criminal Juvenil, Depalma Lexis Nexis, Buenos Aires, Sixth Edition, 2003
14. Radiografia de la Universidad en las Américas. Summer 1973. UNM Press (with M. Nason).
15. Conducta, Integrativismo Sociología Del Derecho, (Conduct and Legal Sociology). De Zavalia, 1970.
16. Co-editor "Studies in Sociology", Bilingual Magazine, in English and Spanish, of international circulation, 9 vols., Omeba, Buenos Aires, Argentina, 1961–1965.
