= Marita Monteleone =

Argentine radio broadcaster (1957–2026)

María de los Ángeles Araceli Monteleone (September 12, 1957 – June 3, 2026), better known as Marita Monteleone, was an Argentine radio broadcaster.

== Life and career ==
As a broadcaster she worked at a number of stations, including Radio La Red, Radio Del Plata, Radio Zónica, Radio Buenos Aires, Radio Splendid, Radio Nacional, Radio Mitre and Radio El Mundo.

Monteleone was the first woman in the world to record the phone book for the 110 phone number, by voice recognition, 214,000 Word files, in one year and nine months of work.

Monteleone died on June 3, 2026, at the age of 68.

== Awards ==
- Martín Fierro Award (2001 and 2011)
- Outstanding Personality of the Autonomous City of the City of Buenos Aires in the field of culture. December 2, 2022.
