= León Balter =

Argentine journalist (1928–2025)

León Balter (17 June 1928 – 8 August 2025) was an Argentine journalist.

== Life and career ==
Balter was born on 17 June 1928, in San Juan Province. Beginning his career in 1943, he was active in journalism for more than four decades.

Between 1955 and 1983, he resided in California and was nicknamed "The reporter of the stars" due to his numerous interviews with public figures including John Wayne, Clint Eastwood, Frank Sinatra, Marlon Brando, Cary Grant, Elvis Presley, among others. He was a correspondent of the Argentine magazines TV Guía (TV Guide) and Radiolandia 2000 in the US.

He was a member of the Hollywood Foreign Press Association, and was among the only Argentine journalists to be associated with The Beatles.

Balter died on 8 August 2025, at the age of 97.
