= Samuel Gelblung =

Argentine journalist (1944–2026)

- Born: 7 February 1944; Buenos Aires, Argentina
- Died: 9 September 2026 (aged 82); Buenos Aires, Argentina
- Other name: Chiche Gelblung
- Occupations: Journalist, television presenter, war correspondent
- Years active: 1965–2026

Samuel Gelblung (7 February 1944 – 9 September 2026), better known as Chiche Gelblung, was an Argentine journalist and television host. In 2022, he was awarded the main award at the Martín Fierro Awards. His last job was hosting a talk show on Crónica TV, where he interviewed guests such as presidential candidates. Gelblung died from respiratory failure on 9 September 2026, at the age of 82.
