= Ernestina Pais =

Argentine journalist and television presenter (1972–2026)

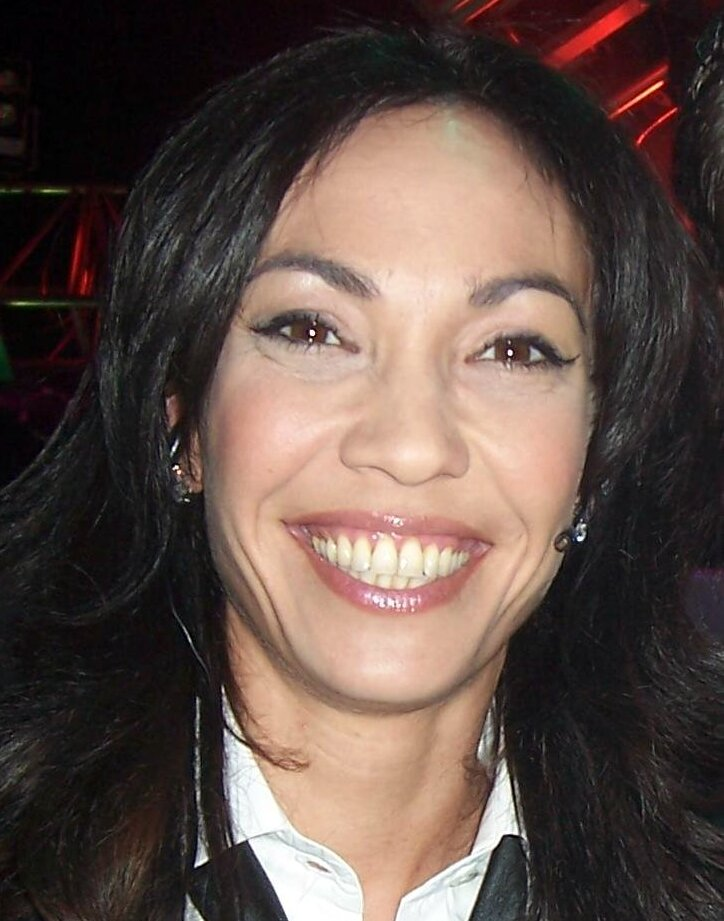
- Pais in 2009
- Born: 12 March 1972; Buenos Aires, Argentina
- Died: 26 June 2026 (aged 54); San Isidro, Argentina
- Occupations: Journalist, television presenter

Ernestina Pais (12 March 1972 – 26 June 2026) was an Argentine journalist and television presenter. She won two Martín Fierro Awards in 2006 and 2007 and was nominated for two more in 2009 and 2012.

Pais died when her car collided with a Tren de la Costa train in San Isidro, on 26 June 2026, at the age of 54.
