= Carlos Quintana (politician) =

Argentine trade unionist and politician (1950–2022)

Provincial Deputy of Buenos Aires
- In office 10 December 2005 – 10 December 2009
- Constituency: Capital Electoral Section

Personal details
- Born: Teodoro Carlos Quintana; 1950 La Plata, Argentina
- Died: 13 July 2022 (aged 71–72) Buenos Aires, Argentina
- Political party: PJ; FPV
- Occupation: Trade unionist

Teodoro Carlos Quintana (1950 – 13 July 2022) was an Argentine trade unionist and politician. A member of the Front for Victory within the Justicialist Party, he served in the Chamber of Deputies of Buenos Aires Province from 2005 to 2009, elected in the Capital Electoral Section.

Quintana died in Buenos Aires on 13 July 2022.
