= Guillermo Salatino =

Argentine sports journalist (1945–2026)

Guillermo Salatino (September 21, 1945 – January 17, 2026) was an Argentine sports journalist.

== Life and career ==
Salatino was born in Buenos Aires on September 21, 1945. Following graduation, he worked with several media companies, including Radio Continental, Mitre, Belgrano and La Red.

In 2007, he was awarded by the Konex Foundation.

== Death ==
Salatino died on January 17, 2026, at the age of 80.
