= Raúl Guglielminetti =

Argentine intelligence officer and convicted criminal (1941–2026)

Raúl Antonio Guglielminetti (November 2, 1941 – January 21, 2026) was an Argentine intelligence officer and convicted criminal.

== Life and career ==
Guglielminetti was born in Buenos Aires on November 2, 1941. During the 1960s he was incorporated as a civilian agent into the Army Intelligence Service, without having passed through any military institution, where he used the alias of Ángel Rogelio Guastavino and called himself "Major".

As a cover for his tasks as a spy he had a professional card from the publication Sur and worked at LU5, a radio station with a large audience in Neuquén, as a sports journalist. When Héctor José Cámpora became president in March 1973, leftist Peronist groups took over the radio and fired him.

On March 25, 1975, when he was hired by the National University of Comahue. During the Argentine military dictatorship (1976–1983) he belonged to the Task Force that was based in the clandestine detention center known as Automotores Orletti, related to operations of the Condor Plan, under the command of Aníbal Gordon. On the day of the coup, March 24, 1976, Guglielminetti arrested teacher Orlando Balbo, who was deaf due to the torture inflicted.

Starting in 1978, he led the Foreign Task Group (GTE) that organized the Argentine military regime's collaboration with the dirty war in Central America, known as Operation Charlie. He was a member of the "Aníbal Gordon gang", for which he was linked to the kidnapping and murder of businessman and banker Osvaldo Sivak in 1985.

== Arrests ==
In 1985, Guglielminetti was arrested as a result of complaints in the Conadep, indicated as a member of the Orletti Automotors gang; he was released after the enactment of the Due Obedience and Full Stop laws.

Guglielminetti arrived in Spain accompanied by two bodyguards and with a million dollars. Persecuted by the Argentine services, he rented a villa in the Madrid urbanization of Molino de la Hoz. Alfonsín asked for the collaboration of the CNI to arrest him. Arrested by the PN at the request of the CNI in Malaga, he was extradited after overcoming several legal procedures that prevented it.

He was arrested at Madrid's Barajas airport carrying a suitcase with money. At that time he was wanted for several common crimes. He was detained in Spain for six months, and was extradited to Argentina. In that year, weapons and explosives were discovered in his house in Mercedes; again he fled abroad. He returned in 1987; He was convicted of that cause and of a robbery, in a ruling that unified the sentence to six years in prison. In 1991 he regained his freedom. At that time, he was benefited by the law of due obedience in a case of torture in Bahía Blanca.

Guglielminetti was arrested again on November 27, 1991, in the case of the death of businessman Emilio Naum, killed while resisting an attempted kidnapping on June 22, 1984, the only crime of which he was accused and which he did not commit. The Justice later determined that Naum had been a victim of the Puccio Clan, with which Guglielminetti had no relationship. He was linked to arms and drug trafficking. On August 9, 2006, he was arrested to be prosecuted for crimes against humanity committed during the dictatorship, He was sentenced to 20 years in prison on March 30, 2011.

== Death ==
Guglielminetti died on January 21, 2026, at the age of 84.
