= José Guccione =

Argentine politician and physician (1952–2021)

José Daniel Guccione
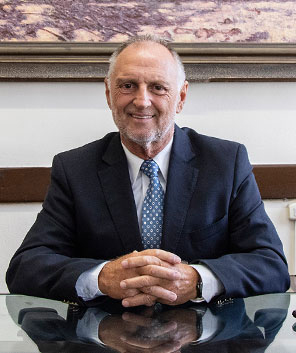

Undersecretary of the Ministry of Health
- In office 2019–2021

National Deputy for Misiones Province
- In office 2011–2015

Minister of Health for Misiones
- In office 2003–2011

Personal details
- Born: February 7, 1952
- Died: February 26, 2021 (aged 69)
- Cause of death: COVID-19
- Occupation: Physician

José Daniel Guccione (7 February 1952 – 26 February 2021) was an Argentine politician and physician.

== Biography ==
He served as a National Deputy for the province of Misiones from 2011 to 2015 and was Minister of Health for that province from 2003 to 2011. At the time of his death, he served as Undersecretary of Federal Coordination of the Ministry of Health of the Nation.

Prior to being a provincial minister, he held various positions, including director of Madariaga de Posadas Hospital and president of the Provincial Regulatory Entity for Water and Sewers.

He died from COVID-19 during the COVID-19 pandemic in Argentina, nineteen days after his 69th birthday.
