= Malvinas Day =

Holiday in Argentina

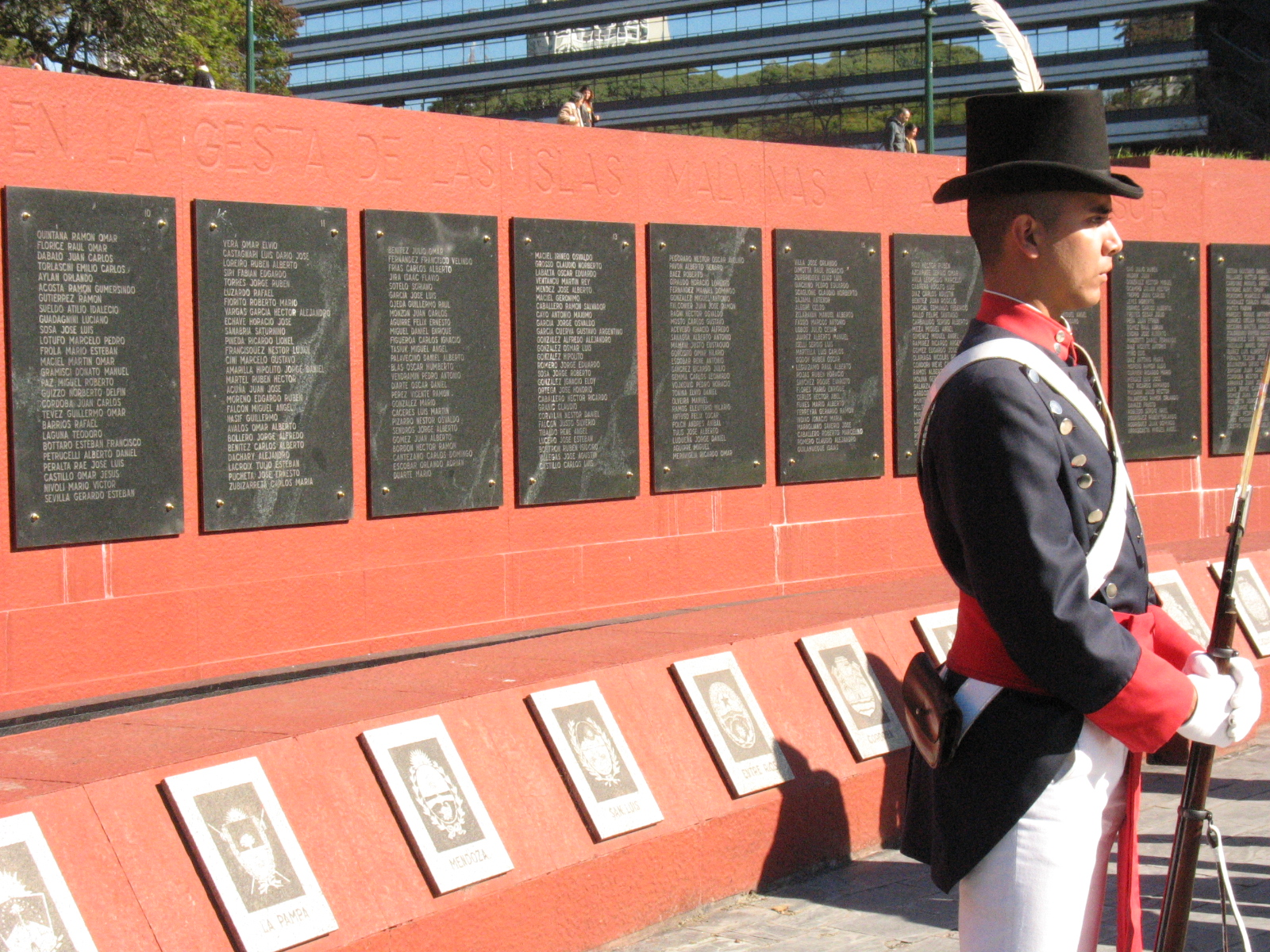
- Malvinas War Memorial in Buenos Aires, with permanent honour guard
- Observances: Argentina
- Date: 2 April
- Next time: 2 April 2026
- Frequency: Annual

Malvinas Day (Spanish: Día de las Malvinas), officially Day of the Veterans and Fallen of the Malvinas War (Día del Veterano y de los Caídos en la Guerra de las Malvinas), is a public holiday in Argentina, observed each year on 2 April. The name refers to the Falkland Islands, known in Argentina as the Islas Malvinas.

== Overview ==
The holiday is a tribute to Argentina's soldiers killed in the Falklands War, which began with the Argentine invasion of the islands on 2 April 1982. A total of 649 Argentines—633 military and 16 civilian—lost their lives during the 74-day occupation.

Malvinas Day was first introduced on 22 November 2000, and replaced the "Day of Argentine Sovereignty over the Malvinas, Sandwich and South Atlantic Islands" (Día de los Derechos Argentinos sobre las Islas Malvinas, Sandwich y del Atlántico Sur) observed on 10 June, which had until then commemorated the appointment by Buenos Aires of Luis Vernet as governor of the islands in 1829. Malvinas Day is not observed in the Falklands, although a related holiday called Liberation Day is celebrated on 14 June to mark the surrender of Argentine forces. There is also a celebratory day called Falklands Day on 14 August which celebrates the first recorded sighting of the islands by John Davis in 1592.

== See also ==
- Argentina–United Kingdom relations
