= First National Government =

Public holiday in Argentina

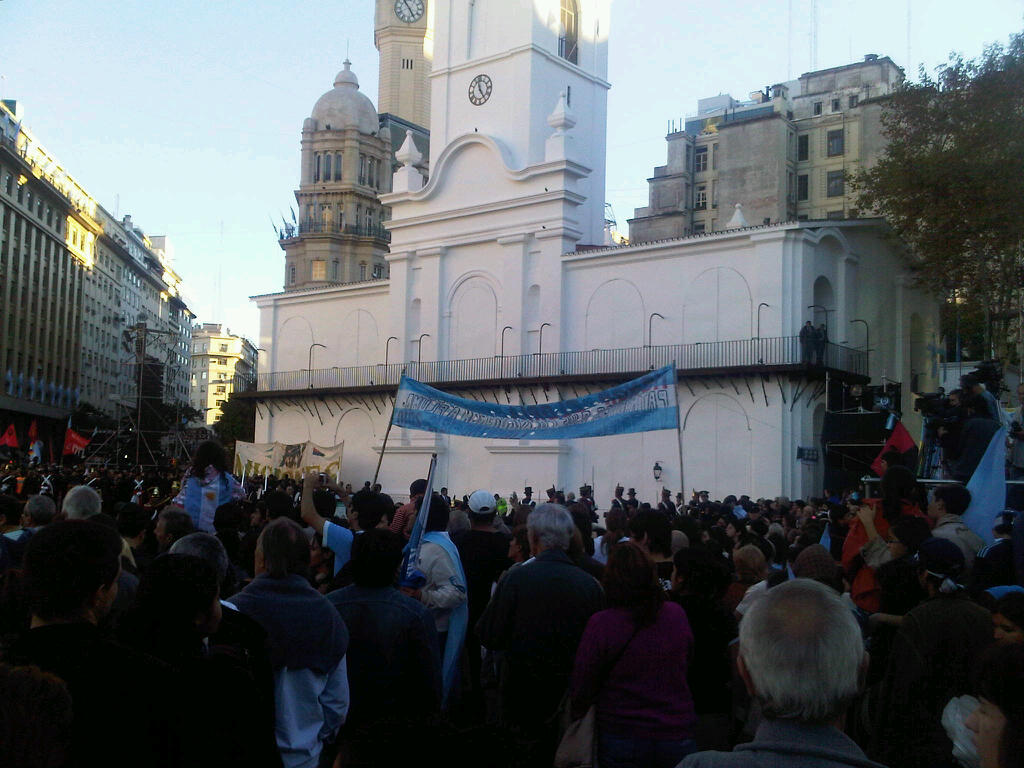
- People gathered around the Buenos Aires Cabildo, during the Argentina Bicentennial
- Also called: Spanish: Primer gobierno patrio
- Observed by: Argentina
- Date: 25 May
- Next time: 25 May 2026
- Frequency: annual

First National Government (Spanish: primer gobierno patrio) is a public holiday of Argentina, commemorating the May Revolution and the creation of the Primera Junta on 25 May 1810, which is considered the first patriotic government of Argentina. Along with 9 July, which commemorates the Declaration of Independence, it is considered a National Day of Argentina.

== History ==
Commemorations of the May Revolution have been held since 1811, the first anniversary: Cornelio Saavedra ruled so for Buenos Aires, and Manuel Belgrano and Juan José Castelli did the same during their military campaigns at the cities they had under control during the anniversaries. The day was officially declared a national day by the Assembly of Year XIII on May 5, 1813. The 1816 Argentine Declaration of Independence provided an alternative national day. In the beginning, this added to the conflicts between Buenos Aires and the provinces in the Argentine Civil War, with the date in May being related particularly to Buenos Aires and 9 July to the whole country. This led the unitarian Bernardino Rivadavia to cancel the celebration on July, and the federalist Juan Manuel de Rosas to re-allow it, but without giving up celebrations on May. The celebrations in 1857, when Buenos Aires had temporary seceded from the Argentine Confederation, were large and included the remodeling of the Plaza. By 1880, with the federalization of Buenos Aires, the local connotations were removed and the May Revolution was considered the birth of the nation.

Massive celebrations of the holiday have been a tradition during the 19th century and part of the 20th century, but were slowly forgotten by the end of it. However, the Argentina Bicentennial held in 2010 raised again the public interest in the holiday, becoming the most attended public event in the history of Buenos Aires.

== Legal status ==
25 May is considered a national and non-workable holiday by law 21.329. It is immovable, meaning it is celebrated on 25 May regardless of day of the week.
