= Raúl Jalil =

Argentine politician (born 1963)

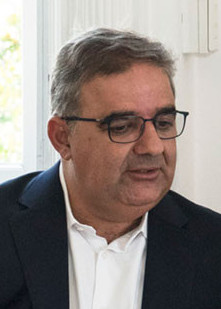

Governor of Catamarca
- Incumbent
- Assumed office 10 December 2019
- Vice Governor: Rubén Dusso
- Preceded by: Lucía Corpacci

Mayor of Catamarca
- In office 9 December 2011 – 6 December 2019
- Preceded by: Ricardo Guzmán
- Succeeded by: Gustavo Saadi

Provincial Legislator of Catamarca
- In office 10 December 2005 – 10 December 2009

Personal details
- Born: 25 August 1963 (age 63) San Fernando del Valle de Catamarca, Argentina
- Party: Justicialist Party
- Other political affiliations: Front for Victory (until 2019); Frente de Todos (since 2019)
- Education: University of Belgrano

Raúl Alejandro Jalil (born 25 August 1963) is an Argentine Justicialist Party politician who is currently governor of Catamarca Province, since 10 December 2019. Previously, from 2011 to 2019, he was intendente (mayor) of San Fernando del Valle de Catamarca, the capital city of Catamarca Province.

== Early life and education ==
Raúl Alejandro Jalil was born on 25 August 1963, son of José Guido Jalil, a physician and politician of Lebanese origin who was mayor of San Fernando del Valle de Catamarca from 1987 to 1991. He studied economics and administration at the University of Belgrano in Buenos Aires.

== Political career ==
In 2005 Jalil was elected to the provincial legislature of Catamarca on the Justicialist Party list. He ran for the mayoralty of San Fernando del Valle de Catamarca in 2011 in the Front for Victory ticket, succeeding Ricardo Guzmán; he won the election and took office on 9 December 2011. During his tenure as mayor he sponsored a number of initiatives aimed at improving the quality of life for the city's inhabitants, such as the renovation of the historical district of the city, the urbanization of the southern access, and the creation of a local police force (Guardia Urbana Municipal).

Jalil was re-elected in 2015 with 41.3% of the vote.

=== Governor of Catamarca ===
Ahead of the 2019 general election, Jalil was nominated as the Frente de Todos candidate for the governorship of Catamarca, succeeding Lucía Corpacci (who was, herself, running for a seat in the Chamber of Deputies). He won the election with 60.45% of the vote and over 133 thousand votes.

== Personal life ==
Jalil is a Roman Catholic. He is married to Silvana Ginocchio, who is a National Deputy representing Catamarca since 2017; Jalil and Ginocchio have two children. Jalil has expressed his opposition to the legalization of abortion in Argentina, but has said he supports keeping the discussion on the matter open.

Political offices
Preceded by Lucía Corpacci	Governor of Catamarca; 2019–present	Incumbent
