= Eber Solís =

Argentine politician

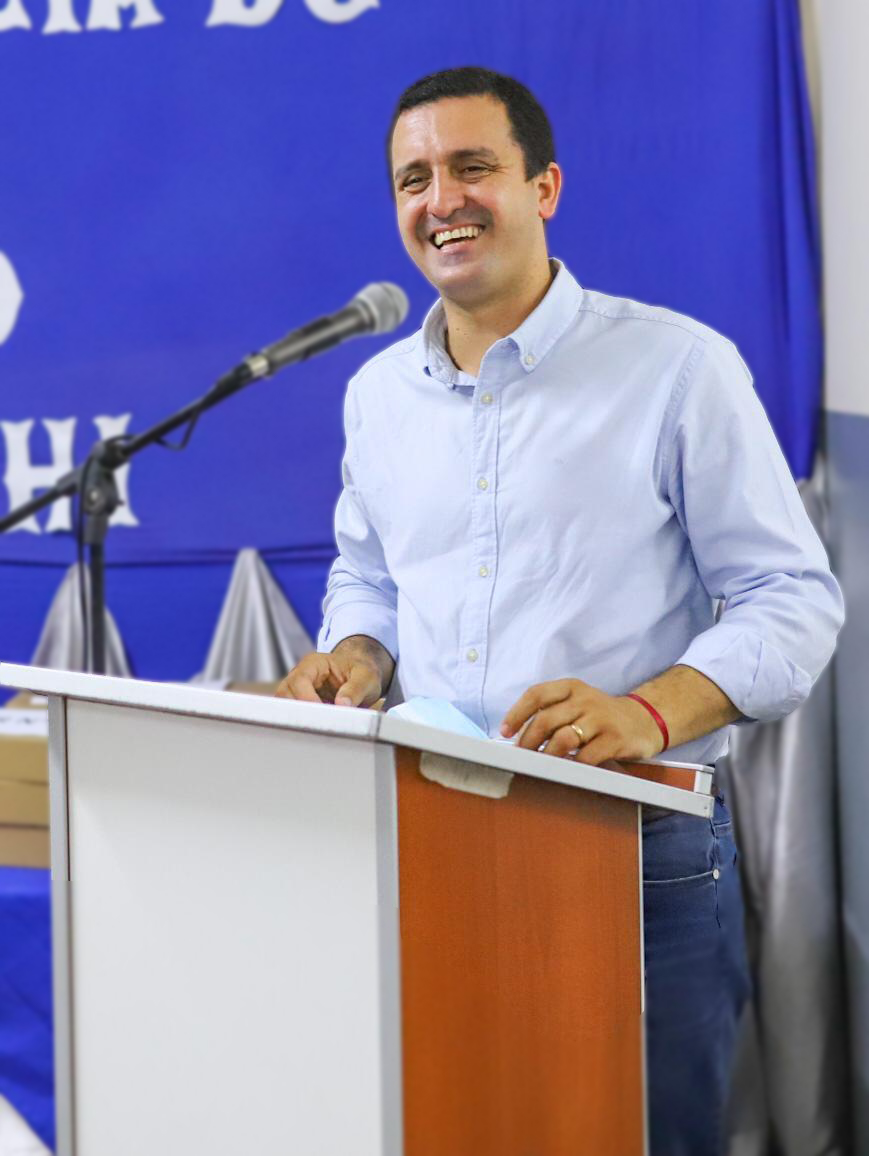

Vice Governor of Formosa
- Incumbent
- Assumed office 11 December 2019
- Governor: Gildo Insfrán
- Preceded by: Floro Bogado

Provincial Deputy of Formosa
- In office 10 December 2015 – 10 December 2019

Personal details
- Born: 21 April 1984 (age 42) Laguna Blanca, Formosa, Argentina
- Party: Justicialist Party
- Education: National University of the Northeast

Eber Wilson Solís (born 21 April 1984) is an Argentine politician who has been Vice Governor of Formosa since 2019, under Governor Gildo Insfrán. He previously served as a member of the provincial legislature from 2015 to 2019. Solís belongs to the Justicialist Party.

== Early life ==
Solís was born on 21 April 1984 in Laguna Blanca, Formosa he is the son of Rosa Elisa Shalamuck, a native of Entre Ríos, who worked as a teacher. He finished high school at the Escuela Provincial de Nivel Medio N° 22 “Malvinas Argentinas”, and then went on to earn a law degree from the National University of the Northeast (UNNE) in Corrientes.

== Political career ==
Solís began his political activism in "Formosa Unida y Solidaria", a group within the provincial Justicialist Party. In 2015, Solís was elected to the Chamber of Deputies of Formosa on the Justicialist Party list for the majority. Before being elected, he had served as Secretary of Planning for Public Investment.

Toward the end of his term as deputy, in 2019, Solís was selected to be the running mate of Governor Gildo Insfrán in the gubernatorial re-election ticket. Floro Bogado, who had served as Insfrán's vice governor ever since Insfrán was first elected in 1995, had died in 2017. The Insfrán–Solís ticket won the gubernatorial election with 70.64% of the vote. He was sworn in on 10 December 2019.

Political offices
| Preceded by Floro Bogado | Vice Governor of Formosa; 2019–present | Incumbent |
