= Flag Day (Argentina) =

Holiday dedicated to the Argentine flag

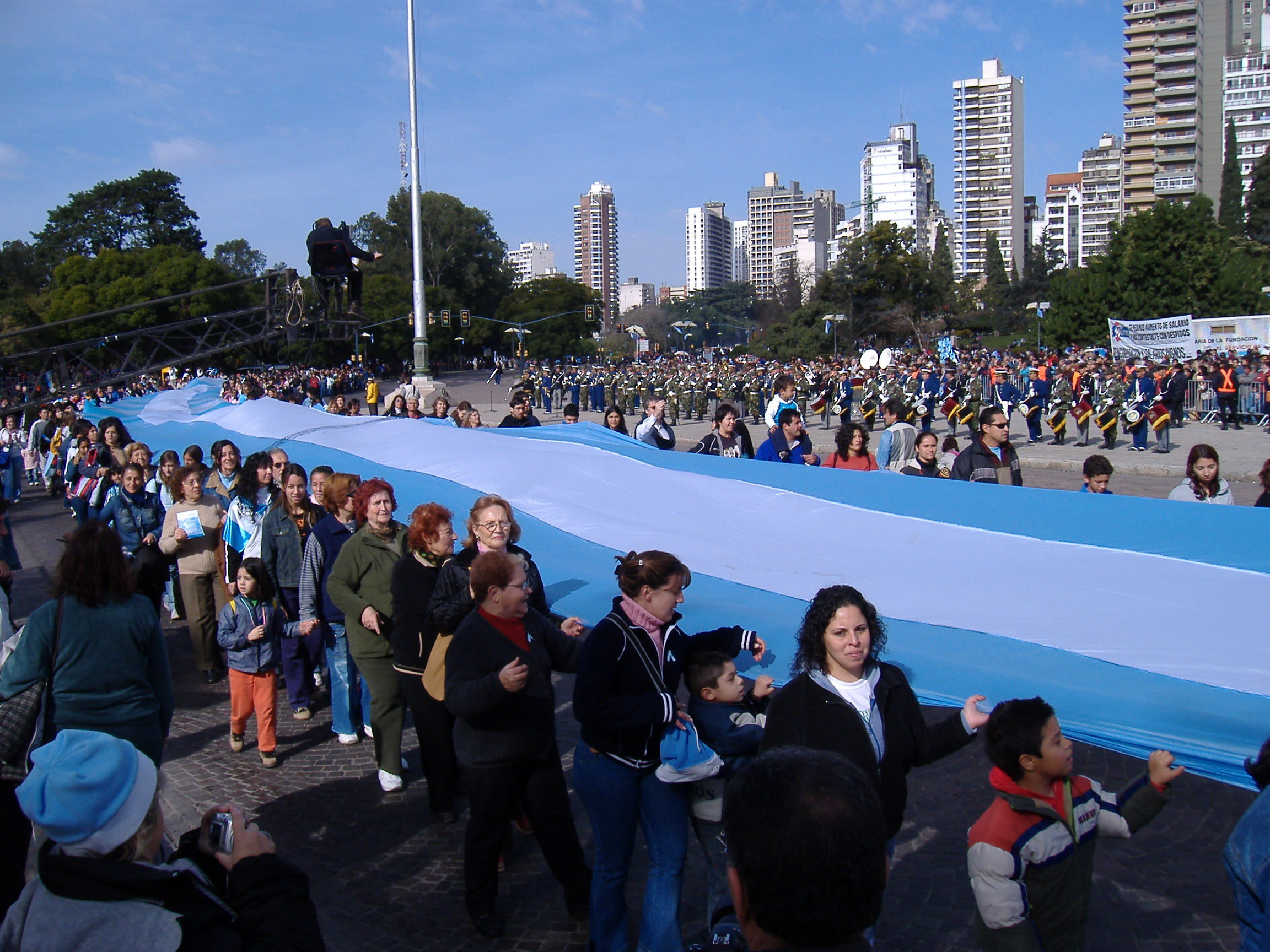
- Citizens carrying a long Argentine flag in Rosario during Flag Day 2006
- Observed by: Argentina
- Significance: Commemoration of the death of Manuel Belgrano, creator of the Flag of Argentina.
- Celebrations: Massive meetings at the National Flag Memorial
- Date: 20 June
- Next time: 20 June 2026
- Frequency: Annual

Flag Day (Spanish: Día de la Bandera Nacional) is the holiday dedicated to the Argentine flag and to the commemoration of its creator, Manuel Belgrano. It is celebrated on 20 June, the anniversary of Belgrano's death in 1820. This date was designated in 1938.

The main seat of the Flag Day commemorations is the National Flag Memorial, in the city of Rosario in Santa Fe Province, where the flag was first hoisted on two artillery batteries in opposite banks of the Paraná River. The flag was created on 27 February 1812, but that date is not officially commemorated in any way. The celebration consists of a public meeting, speeches by the municipal and provincial authorities, the attendance of the President, and a parade including members of the military, veterans of the Malvinas War, the police force, and a number of civilian organizations and associations.

== Commemoration ==
Flag Day was created by law Nº 12,361, on June 8, 1938. Initially, it was a celebration held in a fixed day, but law Nº 24,445 modified it to be commemorated on the third Monday of the month. This design creates long weekends and boosts tourism. Within the jurisdiction of Rosario, however, 20 June is always a non-working day for employees of the municipal and provincial administrations, and for all public and private schools. Hermes Binner made a project of law in 2006 to derogate this modification and restore both celebrations in fixed days, but the proposal expired because of not being treated by the Congress in a whole year. Nevertheless, Binner (governor of Santa Fe by then) and the mayor of Rosario, Miguel Lifschitz, insisted in the 2010 Flag Day that Congress should repeal the law and restore the commemoration to fixed days.
