= 1997 Argentine provincial elections =

Provincial elections were held in Argentina in 1997.

== Corrientes ==
=== Governor ===
Candidates		Party	First round		Second round	
Governor	Vice governor	Party	Votes	%	Votes	%
Pedro Braillard Poccard	Víctor Hugo Maidana	Frente Partido Nuevo	205,779	48.49	252,017	70.34
Carlos Lorenzo Tomasella Cima	María Isabel Brisco de Romero Feris	Autonomist–Liberal Pact	83,463	19.67	106,290	29.66
Rubén Pruyas	Daniel Ávalos	Justicialist Party	77,338	18.23		
Diego Brest	Humberto Barros	Frente de Todos	56.307	13,27		
Sergio Tomasella		Frente Pueblo Unido (PCA–CPL)	1,464	0.34		
Source: Ministry of the Interior

=== Deputies ===
Party	Votes	%	Seats
Frente Partido Nuevo	198.579	47.44	7
Autonomist–Liberal Pact	83.348	19.91	2
Justicialist Party	75.822	18.11	2
Frente de Todos	59.372	14.18	2
Frente Pueblo Unido (PCA–CPL)	1.487	0.36	0
Source: Ministry of the Interior

=== Senate ===
Party	Votes	%	Seats
Frente Partido Nuevo	199,953	47.69	2
Autonomist–Liberal Pact	83,477	19.91	1
Justicialist Party	75.752	18.07	1
Frente de Todos	58,618	13.98	0
Frente Pueblo Unido (PCA–CPL)	1,475	0.35	0
Source: Ministry of the Interior
