= Nancy Sand =

Argentine politician (born 1964)

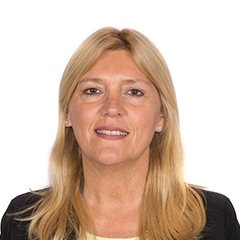

National Deputy
- Incumbent
- Assumed office 10 December 2019
- Constituency: Corrientes

Provincial Senator of Corrientes
- In office 10 December 2015 – 28 November 2019

Mayor of Bella Vista
- In office 10 December 2009 – 10 December 2013
- Preceded by: Mario Haberle
- Succeeded by: Walter Andrés Chávez

Personal details
- Born: 4 January 1964 (age 62) Corrientes, Argentina
- Party: Justicialist Party
- Other political affiliations: Front for Victory (2009–2017); Frente de Todos (2019–present)
- Education: Escuela Normal Superior de Saladas

Nancy Aracely Sand Giorasi (born 4 January 1964) is an Argentine teacher and politician, currently serving as National Deputy representing Corrientes Province. A member of the Justicialist Party, Sand was previously served as intendenta (mayor) of Bella Vista from 2009 to 2013, and as member of the Provincial Senate from 2015 to 2019.

== Early and personal life ==
Sand Giorasi was born on 4 January 1964 in Corrientes. She studied to be a teacher at the Escuela Normal Superior in Saladas, Corrientes.

Sand is the aunt of professional footballers José "Pepe" Sand and Darío Sand.

== Political career ==
Sand was a member of the Bella Vista City Council from 2001 to 2005, and later served as secretary of the Chamber of Senators of Corrientes Province from 2005 to 2009. She ran for the mayoralty of Bella Vista in 2009 under the "Frente de Todos por el Cambio" coalition; she won the election with 56.74% of the vote. Sand was the first member of the Justicialist Party to win a local election in Bella Vista in 36 years.

From 2013 to 2015, she was Secretary of Community Development of the Corrientes municipal government. In 2015, she was elected to the Chamber of Senators of Corrientes. She resigned from her seat in the Senate on 28 November 2019.

At the 2019 legislative election, Sand was the second candidate in the Frente de Todos coalition list, behind José Ruiz Aragón. The list received 50.98% of the vote, and both Ruiz Aragón and Sand were elected.

During her 2019–2023 term, Sand formed part of the parliamentary commissions on Population and Human Development, Education, Regional Economies and Development, Mercosur, and Municipal Affairs. She was an opponent of the legalization of abortion in Argentina, voting against the 2020 Voluntary Interruption of Pregnancy bill that passed the Chamber.
