= Front for Everyone =

Front for Everyone may refer to:

- Frente de Todos (1996 coalition), a political party alliance in Argentina, founded in 1996
- Frente de Todos (2019 coalition), a political party alliance in Argentina, founded in 2019
