= Barrio Esperanza =

- Town
- Location of Barrio Esperanza in Argentina
- Coordinates: 27°32′51″S 58°47′8″W
- Country: Argentina
- Province: Corrientes
- Department: Capital
- Municipality: Corrientes
- Time zone: UTC−3 (ART)

Barrio Esperanza is a barrio under the administration of the city of Corrientes in Corrientes Province, Argentina. It is essentially a village in far southern suburbs, northwest of the village of Riachuelo. According to the 2001 population census conducted by INDEC its population was 2236 inhabitants. The barrio was established in 1990. It is roughly 5 kilometres from the right bank of Arroyo Riachuelo and its mouth on the Paraná River and 3 km from National Route 12 (Ruta Nacional 12).
