= Pedro Braillard Poccard =

Argentine politician and lawyer

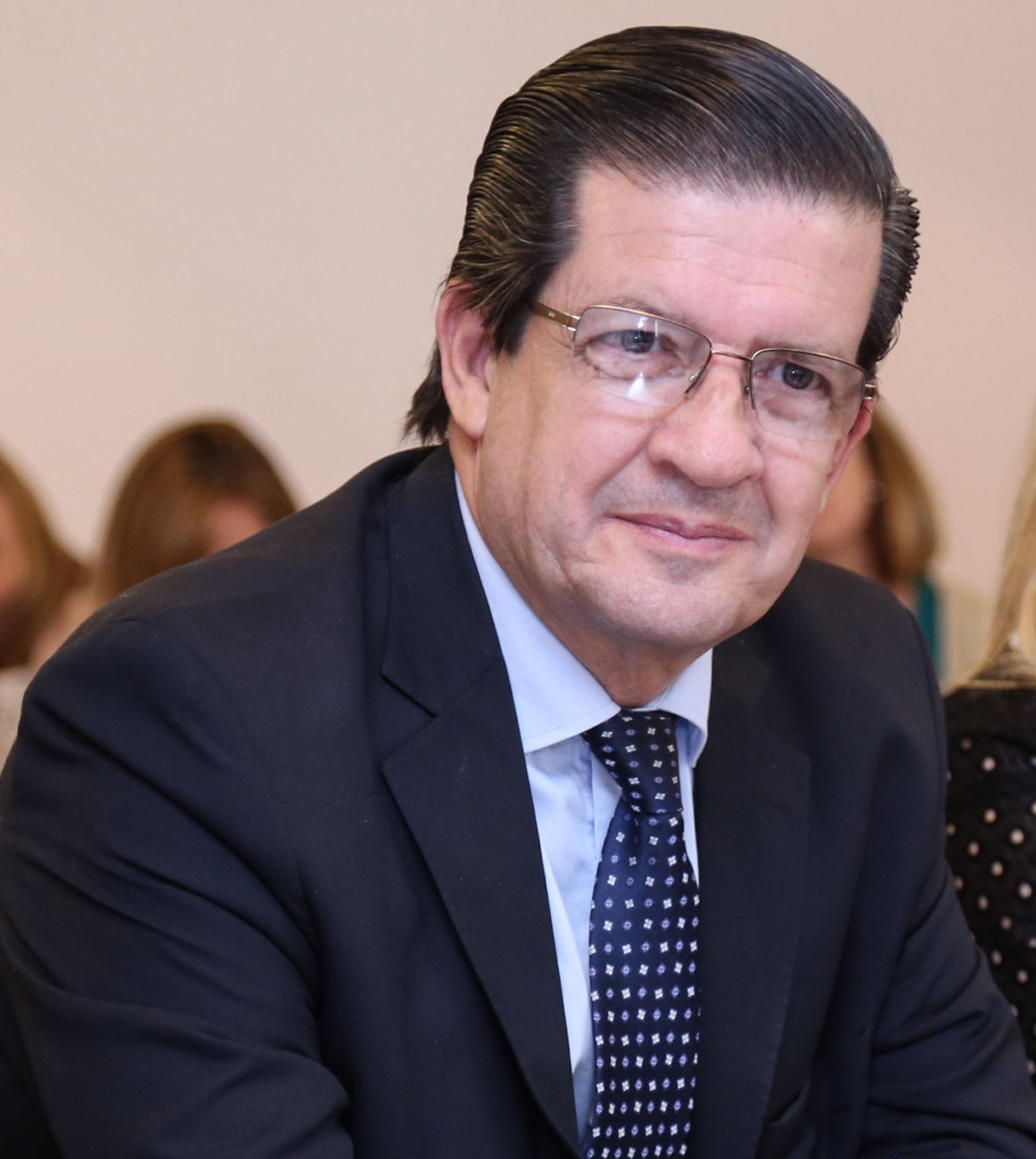

Vice Governor of Corrientes
- Incumbent
- Assumed office 10 December 2021
- Governor: Gustavo Valdés; Juan Pablo Valdés
- Preceded by: Gustavo Canteros
- In office 10 December 2009 – 10 December 2013
- Governor: Ricardo Colombi
- Preceded by: Tomás Rubén Pruyas
- Succeeded by: Gustavo Canteros

National Senator
- In office 10 December 2015 – 10 December 2021
- Constituency: Corrientes

Provincial Deputy of Corrientes
- In office 10 December 2005 – 10 December 2009

Governor of Corrientes
- In office 10 December 1997 – 19 June 1999
- Vice Governor: Víctor Hugo Maidana
- Preceded by: Raúl Rolando Romero Feris
- Succeeded by: Hugo Perié (interim)

Personal details
- Born: Néstor Pedro Braillard Poccard; 8 April 1954 (age 72) Corrientes, Argentina
- Party: Liberal Party of Corrientes (until 1997); New Party (1997–2003); People's Party of Corrientes (since 2003)
- Education: National University of the Northeast

Néstor Pedro Braillard Poccard (born 8 April 1954) is an Argentinian politician, who served as Governor of Corrientes Province between 1997 and 1999 when he was displaced by an impeachment. He also served as National Senator representing Corrientes between 2015 and 2021. Since 2021 he has served as Vice Governor of Corrientes.

He studied law at the National University of the Northeast, where he is now a professor in the Law Department.
