= Juan Pablo Valdés =

Argentine politician

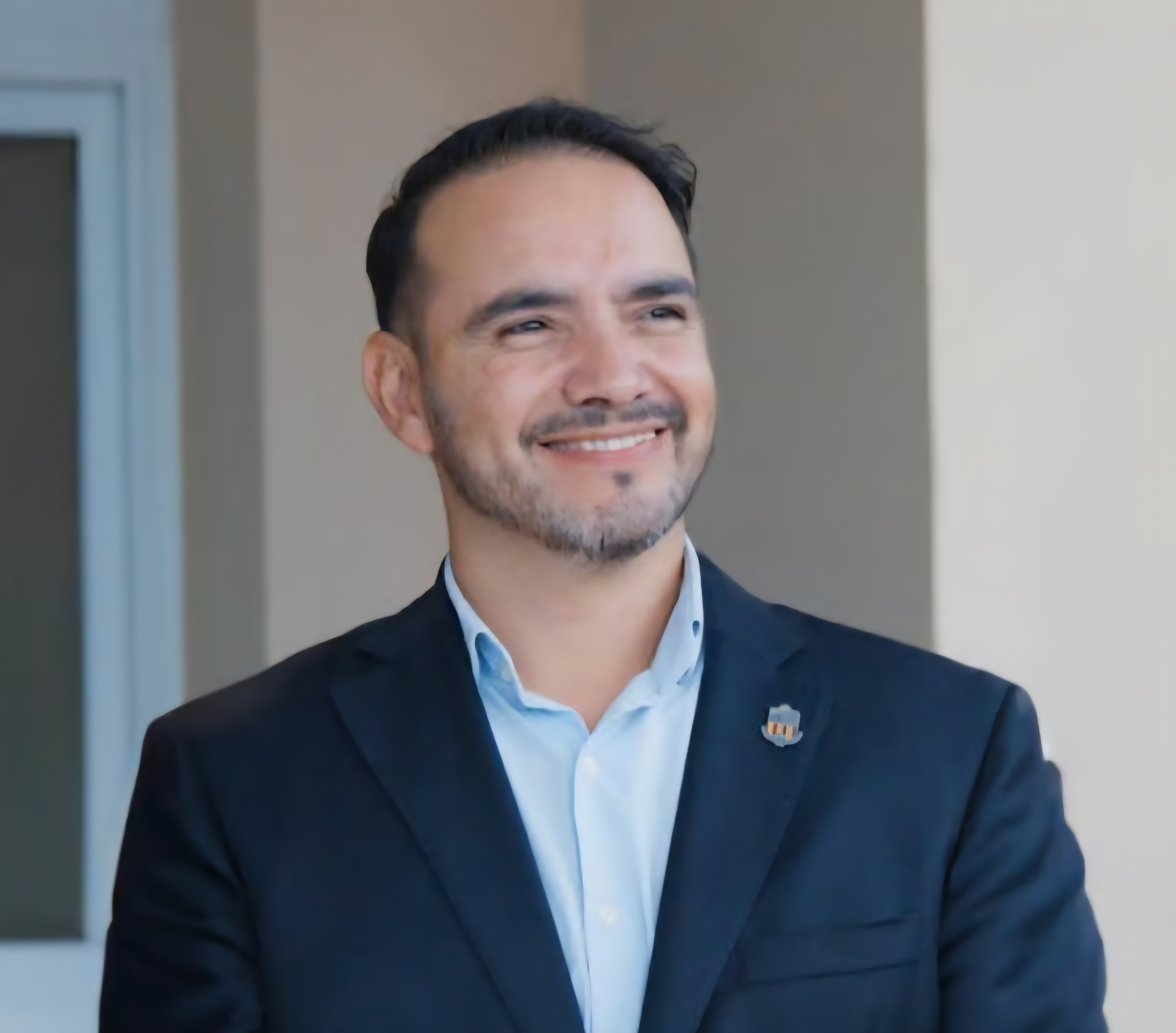

Governor of Corrientes
- Incumbent
- Assumed office 10 December 2025
- Vice Governor: Pedro Braillard Poccard
- Preceded by: Gustavo Valdés

Mayor of Ituzaingó
- In office 10 December 2021 – 10 December 2025
- Preceded by: Eduardo Burna
- Succeeded by: Emilio Nicolas

Personal details
- Born: 25 August 1983 (age 42) Ituzaingó, Corrientes, Argentina
- Party: Radical Civic Union
- Other political affiliations: Vamos Corrientes (2025–present)

Juan Pablo Valdés (born 25 August 1983) is an Argentine politician affiliated with the Radical Civic Union. He served as mayor of Ituzaingó, Corrientes Province, and was elected governor of Corrientes Province in 2025.

== Personal life ==
Valdés was born in Corrientes on 25 August 1983. He is the fourth and youngest child of Manuel Valdés and Juana Mosqueda, both of whom had political careers in Ituzaingó: his father served two terms as mayor for the Radical Civic Union, while his mother was a municipal councillor for the Justicialist Party. His brother, Gustavo Valdés, served two terms as governor of Corrientes.

He attended School No. 495 "Provincia de La Rioja" and trained as a reserve midshipman at the Liceo Militar Naval Almirante Storni in Posadas. He began studying law but did not complete the degree. He became active in the Radical Civic Union at a young age and was appointed president of its local committee in 2018.

== Political career ==
=== Mayor of Ituzaingó ===
After taking office as mayor in December 2021, his administration introduced a plan intended to improve infrastructure, promote tourism development, and generate employment.

The municipality implemented an urban infrastructure plan to pave streets and install LED lighting in residential neighbourhoods. As part of the initiative, it established a municipal concrete plant to reduce costs and employ local workers. As part of the plan, paving and lighting works were completed in several neighborhoods of the city.

The municipality began construction of the new Port of Ituzaingó, a strategic project financed by the provincial government. The nearly 300-metre-long port was designed to become the largest in the province, with an initial capacity of up to 2,000 containers and the potential to handle 4,000 in the future. Its location in deep water was intended to ensure that it would remain operational during periods of low river levels, making it an important piece of infrastructure for domestic and international trade.

During Valdés's term as mayor, negotiations were held with the Argentine national government and the Paraguayan government to reopen the Yacyretá International Border Crossing. The crossing, which had remained closed following the COVID-19 pandemic, facilitates passenger traffic between Argentina and Paraguay, particularly during events that produce large movements of people.

=== Governor of Corrientes ===
In July 2025, Valdés confirmed his candidacy in the 2025 provincial elections to succeed his brother, with incumbent vice governor Pedro Braillard Poccard as his running mate. In the election held on 31 August, the Valdés–Braillard Poccard ticket won in the first round with 51.91% of the vote.

== Electoral history ==
Electoral history of Juan Pablo Valdés
Election	Office	List	Votes			Result	Ref.
Election	Office	List	Total	%	P.	Result	Ref.
2025	Governor of Corrientes	ECO + Let's Go, Corrientes!	331,431	51.91%	1st	Elected	

Political offices
Preceded by Eduardo Burna	Mayor of Ituzaingó; 2021–2025	Succeeded by Emilio Nicolas
Preceded by Gustavo Valdés	Governor of Corrientes; 2025–present	Incumbent
