= Gustavo Valdés =

Argentine politician

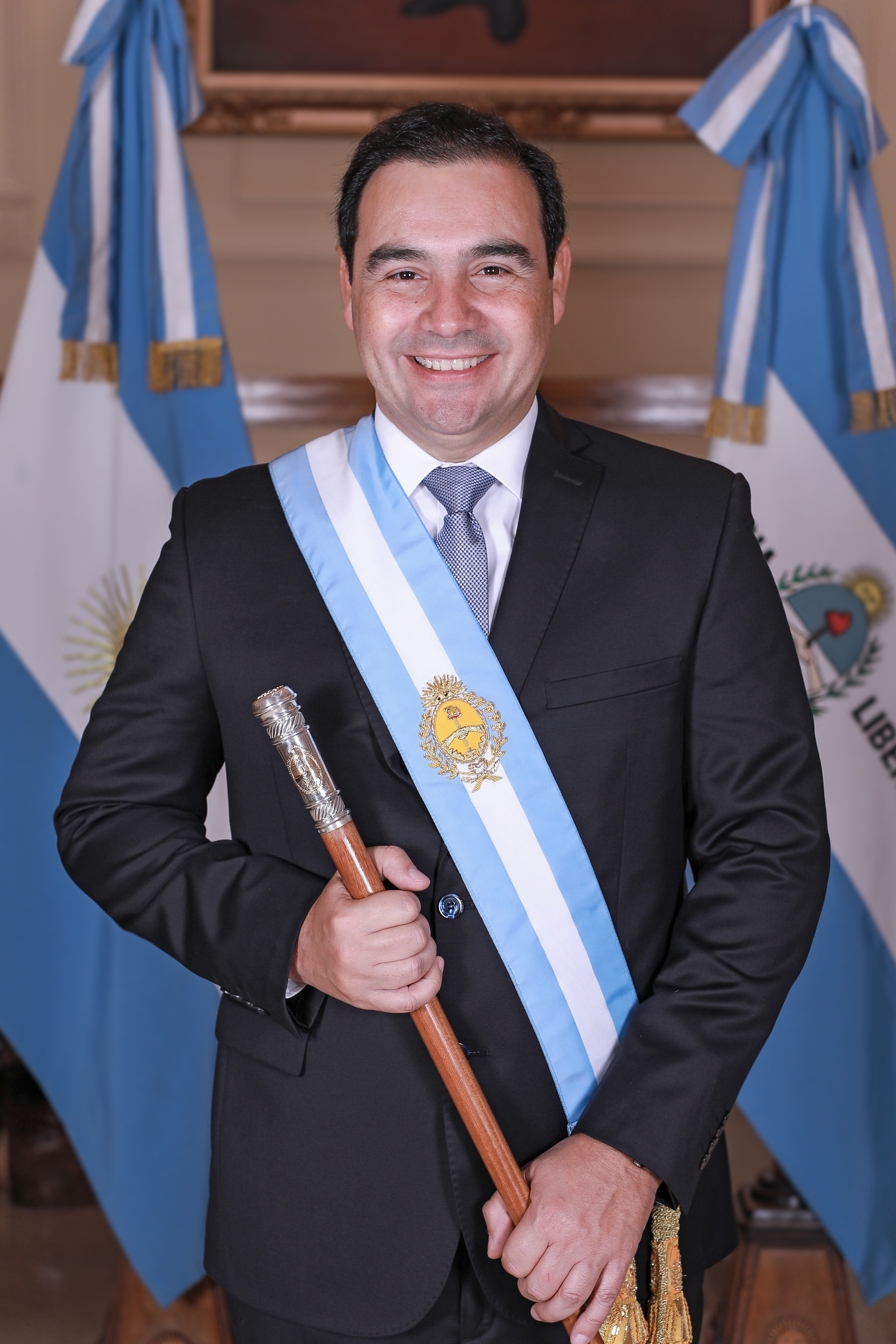

Provincial Senator of Corrientes
- Incumbent
- Assumed office 10 December 2025

Governor of Corrientes
- In office 10 December 2017 – 10 December 2025
- Vice Governor: Gustavo Canteros (2017–2021); Pedro Braillard Poccard (2021–2025)
- Preceded by: Ricardo Colombi
- Succeeded by: Juan Pablo Valdés

Councillor of Magistracy
- In office 18 November 2014 – 10 December 2017
- Appointed by: Chamber of Deputies

National Deputy
- In office 10 December 2013 – 10 December 2017
- Constituency: Corrientes

Minister of Government of Corrientes
- In office 10 December 2009 – 10 December 2013
- Governor: Ricardo Colombi
- Preceded by: Walter Insaurralde
- Succeeded by: Pedro Braillard Poccard

Personal details
- Born: 15 October 1968 (age 57) Corrientes, Argentina
- Party: Radical Civic Union
- Other political affiliations: Encounter for Corrientes (2013–present)
- Education: National University of the Northeast

Gustavo Adolfo Valdés (born 15 October 1968) is an Argentine Radical Civic Union politician. He was governor of Corrientes Province from 2017 to 2025. Previously, from 2013 to 2017, he was a National Deputy for Corrientes.

== Early life and education ==
Gustavo Adolfo Valdés was born on 15 October 1968 in Corrientes, into a political family: his father, Manuel Valdés, was twice mayor of Ituzaingó, while his mother, Juana Mosqueda, was a peronist councilwoman of the same city, where Valdés was raised. Valdés joined the Radical Civic Union (UCR) when he was 15, according to himself inspired by the figure of Raúl Alfonsín.

Valdés was active in the UCR's student wing, Franja Morada, and was president of his high school's student union. He studied law at the National University of the Northeast, earning his licenciatura in 1994.

== Political career ==
Valdés was appointed director of the Corrientes delegation of the National Directorate of Migration in 1997, a post he held until 2001. Under the governorship of Ricardo Colombi, he was appointed the province's Minister of Government.

He was elected to the Argentine Chamber of Deputies in 2013, as the first candidate in the Encuentro por Corrientes ("Encounter for Corrientes") list, which included the UCR; the list won with 46.9% of the vote. In 2014 he was appointed by the Chamber of Deputies to serve as one of the lower house's representatives in the Council of Magistracy, becoming only the second ever representative from Corrientes to serve in the council after José Antonio Romero Feris.

=== Governor of Corrientes ===
Ahead of the 2017 provincial election, incumbent governor Ricardo Colombi, who was term-limited, nominated Valdés to run for governor in the ECO list. He won the election with 54% of the vote. The election was widely highlighted by national media, as Valdés had counted with the explicit endorsement of then-president Mauricio Macri.

== Personal life ==
Valdés is married to Cristina Inés Garro, whom he met while studying law and married in 1994. The couple have three children: María Milagros, Manuel Enrique and Gustavo Joaquín. Valdés is a Roman Catholic and is against the legalization of abortion in Argentina.

Political offices
| Preceded by Ricardo Colombi | Governor of Corrientes; 2017–2025 | Succeeded by Juan Pablo Valdés |
