= Arturo Colombi =

Argentine politician (born 1958)

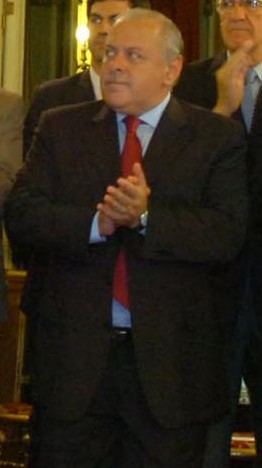
- Governor Arturo Colombi

Governor of Corrientes Province
- In office December 10, 2005 – December 10, 2009
- Lieutenant: Rubén Pruyas
- Preceded by: Ricardo Colombi
- Succeeded by: Ricardo Colombi

Personal details
- Born: January 6, 1958 (age 68) Mercedes
- Party: Radical Civic Union
- Profession: Engineer

Arturo Colombi (born January 6, 1958) is an Argentine Radical Civic Union (UCR) politician, and former governor of Corrientes Province.

Born in Mercedes, Corrientes, and educated at the National University of the Northeast with a degree in civil engineering, Colombi served as provincial Minister of Public Works in the administration of then-governor, his cousin Ricardo Colombi. He was elected governor of the province in 2005, when Ricardo Colombi resigned to stand for a seat in the Argentine Chamber of Deputies.

Colombi was a leading UCR supporter of Peronist President Néstor Kirchner, and led the Frente de Todos (1996 coalition) coalition between the UCR and justicialists in the October 2005 elections, supported by Kirchner. In 2007, he successfully led the Corrientes Province party list supported by presidential candidate Cristina Fernández de Kirchner in elections to congressional seats, but was opposed by his cousin and former ally, Ricardo Colombi.

Like his ally, Vice-President Julio Cobos, Colombi became estranged from the Kirchners during the 2008 Argentine government conflict with the agricultural sector. His bid to for re-election as governor in 2009 was in opposition to both Kirchnerism and to the UCR, which nominated Ricardo Colombi. Amid both family and political acrimony, the latter won the election in the second round, and Arturo Colombi left office without attending his successor's inauguration.

Political offices
Preceded by Ricardo Colombi	Governor of Corrientes; 2005–2009	Succeeded by Ricardo Colombi
