= Yiya Murano =

Argentine serial killer (1930–2014)

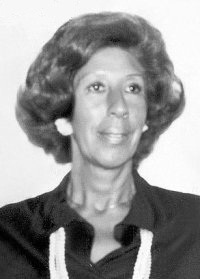
- Murano in 1979
- Born: María de las Mercedes Bernardina Bolla Aponte de Murano; 20 May 1930; Corrientes, Argentina
- Died: 26 April 2014 (aged 83)
- Other name: The Poisoner of Monserrat
- Criminal charges: Murder
- Penalty: 16 years

Details
- Victims: 3
- Span of crimes: February – March 1979
- Country: Argentina
- Killed: 3
- Weapon: Cyanide

María de las Mercedes Bernardina Bolla Aponte de Murano (20 May 1930 – 26 April 2014), better known as Yiya Murano, and also referred to as The Poisoner of Monserrat was an Argentine serial killer and swindler. Convicted of three murders, she was imprisoned for 16 years before being sent to an elderly care facility to serve out the remainder of her sentence, due to her advanced age.

== Murders ==
On March 24, 1979, Murano's cousin, Carmen Zulema "Mema" del Giorgio de Venturini, fell and died on the stairs of the building on Hipólito Yrigoyen Street where she lived. Zulema's death was initially attributed to cardiac arrest. Days later, one of her daughters found that a promissory note worth 20 million Argentine peso ley was missing from her mother's belongings. The building's doorman said that Murano arrived for a visit carrying a mysterious package (which was later discovered to contain petit fours), and had casually asked for a copy of the keys to Zulema's apartment, saying, "I need her phonebook to warn her relatives". Murano entered her cousin's apartment and left quickly, carrying papers and a little bottle. She complained loudly: "My God, it's the third friend of mine to die in a short time!". Zulema's daughter alerted the authorities and during the autopsy, examiners discovered large amounts of cyanide in Zulema's body.

The investigators soon discovered that Nilda Adelina Gamba, a neighbor and old friend of Murano's, had died under rather unclear circumstances on February 10, 1979. Murano owed her a significant amount of money and had offered to stay the night when Gamba went down with a stomachache the previous afternoon. No police investigation was launched due to Nilda's diabetes and her elderly age. A few days later, on February 22, another of Murano's friends, Lelia "Chicha" Formisano de Ayala, was found dead in her Belgrano Avenue apartment. Murano also owed her money and had been seen by neighbours and the doorman's wife entering and leaving Lelia's apartment three days earlier. Although disregarded by the authorities at the time, tea and petit fours were present at the crime scene again. Later on, both bodies showed signs of cyanide poisoning., although this was heavily disputed by Murano's legal team due to alleged inconsistencies in the samples taken for analysis.

== Arrest ==
On 27 April 1979, the police arrested Murano at her home on Mexico Street. In 1980, she was found unconscious in the prison where she was being held; later, Murano underwent surgery and had one of her lungs removed.

Murano was convicted in 1985, incidentally at the same time as the Trial of the Juntas. She insisted upon her innocence, saying: "I never invited anyone to eat."

Murano was released from prison after 16 years. It was learned that she sent the judges who released her a box of chocolates as a token of her appreciation.

== Media ==
Argentine writer Marisa Grinstein included Murano in her book Mujeres Asesinas (Killer Women). In 2006, an episode of the Canal 13 television series of the same name featured a recreation of Murano's crimes. At the end of the episode, the real Yiya Murano appeared and proclaimed her innocence, citing evidence.

The second season of Mujeres Asesinas, the Mexican adaptation of the series, featured an episode based on Murano entitled "Tita Garza, Swindler," starring Patricia Reyes Spindola.

Argenteinan documentary Yiya Murano: Muerte a la hora del té received an English dub and was released as Yiya Murano: Death at Tea Time on Netflix in America in April 2026.

== See also ==
- List of serial killers by country
