= José Ruiz Aragón =

Argentine politician (born 1987)

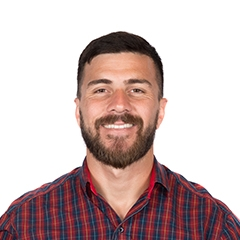

Provincial Senator of Corrientes
- Incumbent
- Assumed office 10 December 2021

National Deputy
- In office 10 December 2015 – 10 December 2021
- Constituency: Corrientes

Personal details
- Born: 14 January 1987 (age 39) Corrientes, Argentina
- Party: Justicialist Party
- Other political affiliations: Front for Victory (2009–2017); Frente de Todos (2019–present)

José Arnaldo "Pitín" Ruiz Aragón (born 14 January 1987) is an Argentine politician. A member of the Justicialist Party and La Cámpora, Ruiz Aragón was a National Deputy from 2015 to 2021, when he was elected to the provincial Senate of Corrientes

== Early and personal life ==
Ruiz Aragón was born on 14 January 1987 in Corrientes. He is married to Marlene Gauna and has two children.

== Political career ==
Ruiz Aragón began his political activism in La Cámpora, a Kirchnerist youth political organization. He became involved in peasant and rural workers' movements in his native Corrientes Province early on. From 2009 to 2011 he was director of the Corrientes government's Youth Directorate, during the governorship of Ricardo Colombi. Later, from 2012 to 2013, he worked in the Ministry of Justice and Human Rights of Argentina, under the administration of Julio Alak. From 2014 to 2015 he was regional director for the Argentine North-East (NEA) of the Ministry of Social Development, under Alicia Kirchner.

At the 2015 legislative election, Ruiz Aragón was the first candidate in the Front for Victory list to the Chamber of Deputies in Corrientes. The list was the most voted with 51.97% of the vote, and Ruiz Aragón was easily elected. He was re-elected in the 2019 legislative election, this time as the first candidate in the Frente de Todos coalition list, which received 50.98% of the vote.

During his 2019–2023 term, Ruiz Aragón presided the parliamentary commission on Agriculture and Livestock, and formed part of the commissions on Elderly People, Energy and Fuels, Maritime Interests, Small and Medium-sized Companies, Tourism, and National Defense. He was a supporter of the legalization of abortion in Argentina, voting in favour of the two Voluntary Interruption of Pregnancy bills that were debated by the Argentine Congress in 2018 and 2020.

Ahead of the 2021 primary election, Ruiz Aragón announced his candidacy to the Corrientes Provincial Senate as part of the Justicialist Party list.
