= Capital Department, Corrientes =

Capital Department Departamento Capital (Spanish) Tetãvore Tavusu (Guarani)
- Department
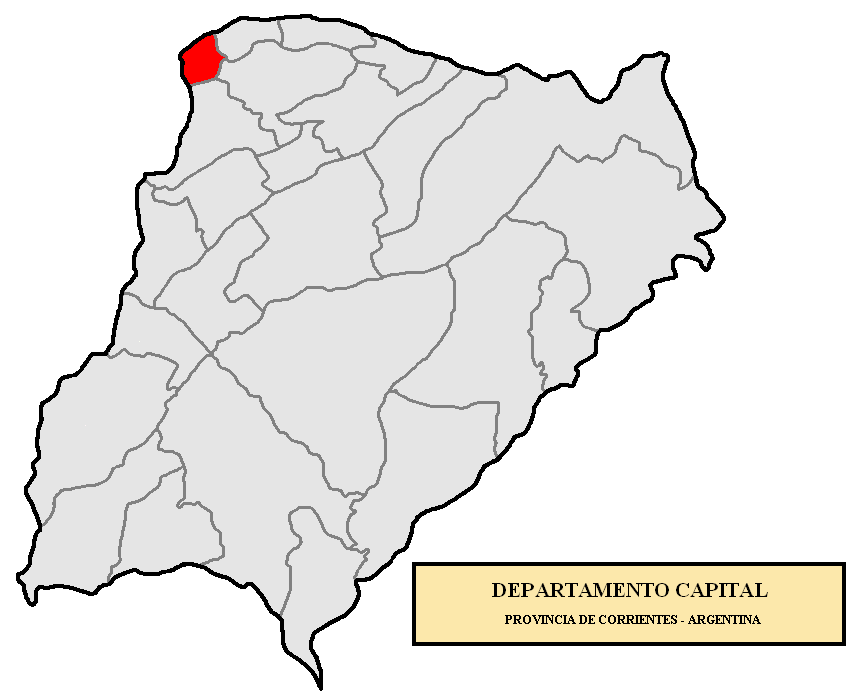
- location of Capital Department in Corrientes Province
- Coordinates: 27°30′S 58°48′W
- Country: Argentina
- Established: 3 Abril 1588
- Founder: Juan Torres de Vera y Aragón
- Seat: Corrientes

Area
  - Total: 522 km^{2} (202 sq mi)

Population (2001 census [INDEC])
  - Total: 328,868
  - Density: 630/km^{2} (1,630/sq mi)
- Demonym: correntino/a
- Postal Code: W3400
- Area Code: 03783

Capital Department is a department of Corrientes Province in Argentina.

The provincial subdivision has a population of about 329,000 inhabitants in an area of 522 km^{2} (202 sq mi), and its capital city is Corrientes, which is located around 1,060 km (660 mi) from Capital Federal.

== Settlements ==
- Corrientes
- Laguna Brava
- Riachuelo
