= Governor of Corrientes Province =

- Provincial coat of Arms

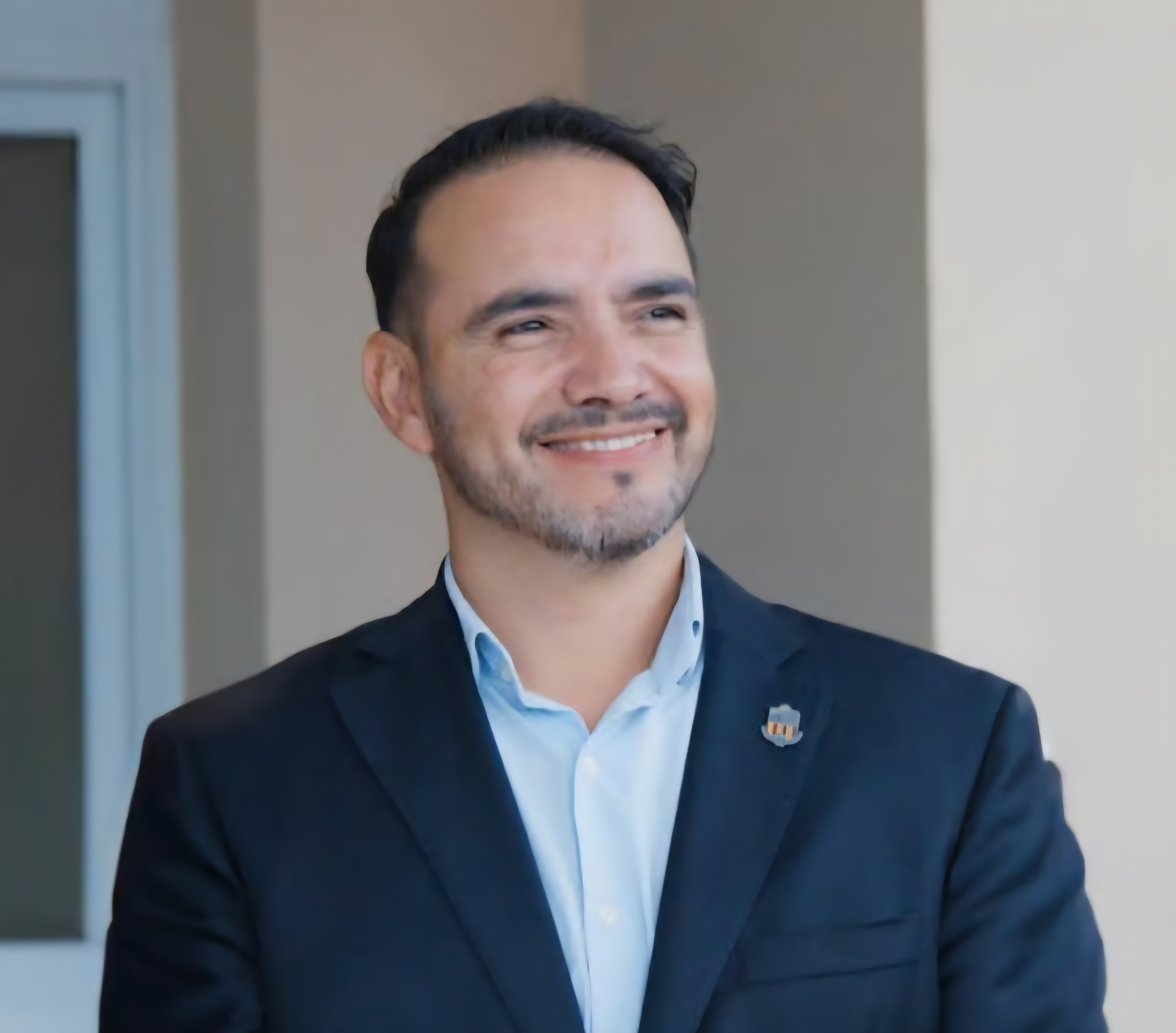
- Incumbent; Juan Pablo Valdés since 10 December 2025
- Appointer: Direct popular vote
- Term length: 4 years
- Inaugural holder: Elías Galván

The Governor of Corrientes (Spanish: Gobernador de la Provincia de Corrientes) is a citizen of Corrientes Province, in Argentina, holding the office of governor for the corresponding period. The governor is elected alongside a vice-governor. Currently the governor of Corrientes is Juan Pablo Valdés, of the Radical Civic Union.

== Governors since 1983 ==
Governor	Term in office	Party	Election	Vice Governor
José Antonio Romero Feris	10 December 1983 – 10 December 1987	PACo	1983	José María García Enciso
Ricardo Guillermo Leconte	10 December 1987 – 10 December 1991	PLCo	1987	Gabriel Feris
Hugo Mancini	10 December 1991 – 7 February 1992	PACo	—N/a	Vacant
Francisco de Durañona y Vedia (Federal Interventor)	7 February 1992 – 14 August 1992	UCEDE	—N/a	Vacant
Claudia Bello (Federal Interventor)	14 August 1992 – 6 February 1993	PJ	—N/a	Vacant
Ideler Tonelli (Federal Interventor)	6 February 1993 – 10 December 1993	UCR	—N/a	Vacant
Raúl Rolando Romero Feris	10 December 1993 – 10 December 1997	PACo	1993	Lázaro Chiappe
Pedro Braillard Poccard	10 December 1997 – 19 June 1999	PaNu	1997	Víctor Hugo Maidana
Hugo Perié	19 June 1999 – 17 December 1999	PJ	—N/a	Vacant
Ramón Mestre (Federal Interventor)	17 December 1999 – 20 March 2001	UCR	—N/a	Vacant
Oscar Aguad (Federal Interventor)	20 March 2001 – 10 December 2001	UCR	—N/a	Vacant
Ricardo Colombi	10 December 2001 – 10 December 2005	UCR	2001	Eduardo Leonel Galantini
Arturo Colombi	10 December 2005 – 10 December 2009	UCR	2005	Tomás Rubén Pruyas
Ricardo Colombi	10 December 2009 – 10 December 2017	UCR	2009	Pedro Braillard Poccard
Ricardo Colombi	10 December 2009 – 10 December 2017	UCR	2013	Gustavo Canteros
Gustavo Valdés	10 December 2017 – 10 December 2009	UCR	2017	Gustavo Canteros
Gustavo Valdés	10 December 2017 – 10 December 2009	UCR	2021	Pedro Braillard Poccard
Juan Pablo Valdés	10 December 2025 – Incumbent	UCR	2025	Pedro Braillard Poccard

== See also ==
- List of provincial legislatures in Argentina
