= Ricardo Colombi =

Argentine lawyer and politician

Governor of Corrientes Province
- In office December 10, 2009 – December 10, 2017
- Vice Governor: Pedro Braillard Poccard (2009-13); Gustavo Cantero (2013- )
- Preceded by: Arturo Colombi
- Succeeded by: Gustavo Valdés

Corrientes Senator
- In office December 10, 2007 – December 10, 2009

National Deputy
- In office December 10, 2005 – December 10, 2007

Governor of Corrientes
- In office December 10, 2001 – December 10, 2005
- Preceded by: Oscar Aguad
- Succeeded by: Arturo Colombi

Personal details
- Born: 30 August 1957 (age 68) Mercedes, Corrientes
- Party: Radical Civic Union
- Other political affiliations: Frente de Todos (1996- 2009) Encuentro por Corrientes (2009-present)
- Spouse: Graciela Barattini
- Profession: Lawyer

Ricardo Colombi (born August 30, 1957) is an Argentine lawyer and politician elected Governor of Corrientes Province in 2009.

== Life and times ==
Ricardo Horacio Colombi was born in Mercedes, a Corrientes Province agricultural and cattle ranching hub at the southern end of the Esteros del Iberá wetlands. He enrolled at the National University of the Northeast and became active in the Franja Morada, the collegiate chapter of the centrist Radical Civic Union (UCR), following which he earned a Law Degree and practiced in his native Mercedes. He married Graciela Barattini in 1988.

Colombi first campaigned for elected office in 1991, and was elected mayor of Mercedes that year. He earned a reputation as a highly-accessible mayor in subsequent years, and was reelected in 1995 and 1999. By 2001, had become the leading opposition figure to the powerful head of the PANU, Raúl Romero Feris. Romero Feris had been convicted of embezzlement, and his controversial 2001 candidacy unified his former allies, the Liberal Party of Corrientes, and a significant faction of the Justicialist Party in opposition to it.

They rallied behind Colombi, who ran on the UCR-led Front for Everyone alliance. Romero Feris narrowly won the first round on October 14, but a November 4 runoff election resulted in a victory for Colombi, who won with 51.2% of the vote. Governing during a national economic recovery, and enjoying President Néstor Kirchner's support, Colombi was prompted by term limits in 2005 to run for a seat in the Argentine Congress and advanced a cousin, Arturo Colombi, as the Front for All candidate for governor. The Corrientes UCR's continued support for the alliance (endorsed by Kirchner) led to a rebuke from the UCR National Committee itself, and this triggered a revolt from the Corrientes chapter of the party, as well as in four others' (notably in Mendoza Province). These differences led to the appearance that year of "K" Radicals (UCR governors and other lawmakers allied with President Kirchner).

Colombi broke with his cousin (the governor), however, and left the Front for All in 2007, when he ran for a seat in the Corrientes Senate on the UCR ticket, and was elected with the endorsement of third parties; as provincial senator, Colombi focused on educational and cultural issues.

Colombi again ran for governor on a UCR-led Corrientes Encounter party, ahead of the 2009 mid-term elections. Colombi's campaign was controversial not only for his choice of running mate (impeached former Governor Pedro Braillard Poccard), but also because it pitted him against his own cousin, who won the first round on September 13. Ricardo Colombi won the runoff on October 4, however, with over 62% of the vote. The runoff victory was clouded, however, by the untimely death that week of Hernán González Moreno, a local journalist who had filed charges of financial wrongdoing against the Colombis in a Paso de los Libres federal court.

Arturo and Ricardo Colombi renewed their former alliance after eight years of estrangement for the latter's 2013 campaign for re-election as governor; despite his affiliation with the UCR, Colombi also received the endorsement of prominent Federal Peronists such as Congressman Francisco de Narváez and Córdoba Province Governor José Manuel de la Sota. He ran against the Front for Victory nominee, Corrientes Mayor Carlos "Camau" Espínola; and a rival of Colombi within the UCR, Senator Nito Artaza. Colombi was reelected on September 15 by a 51-to-46% margin over Camau Espínola, and the UCR - which has governed Corrientes since 1999 - would retain its only governorship among the nation's 23 provinces.

Political offices
Preceded by Arturo Colombi	Governor of Corrientes; 2009–2017	Succeeded by Gustavo Valdés
Preceded by Oscar Raúl Aguad	Governor of Corrientes; 2001-2005	Succeeded by Arturo Colombi
