= Corrientes =

Corrientes Taragui
- City
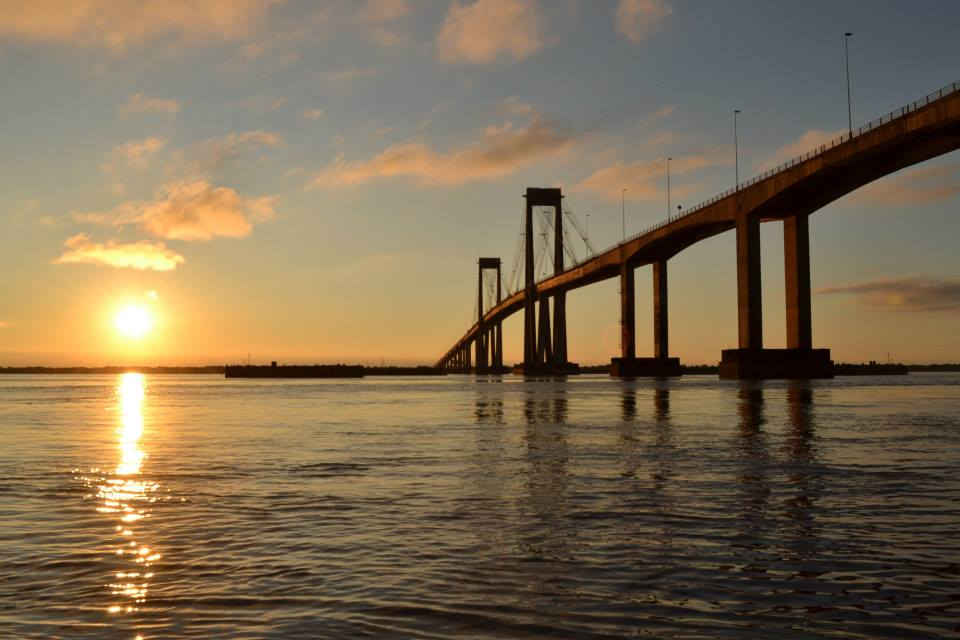
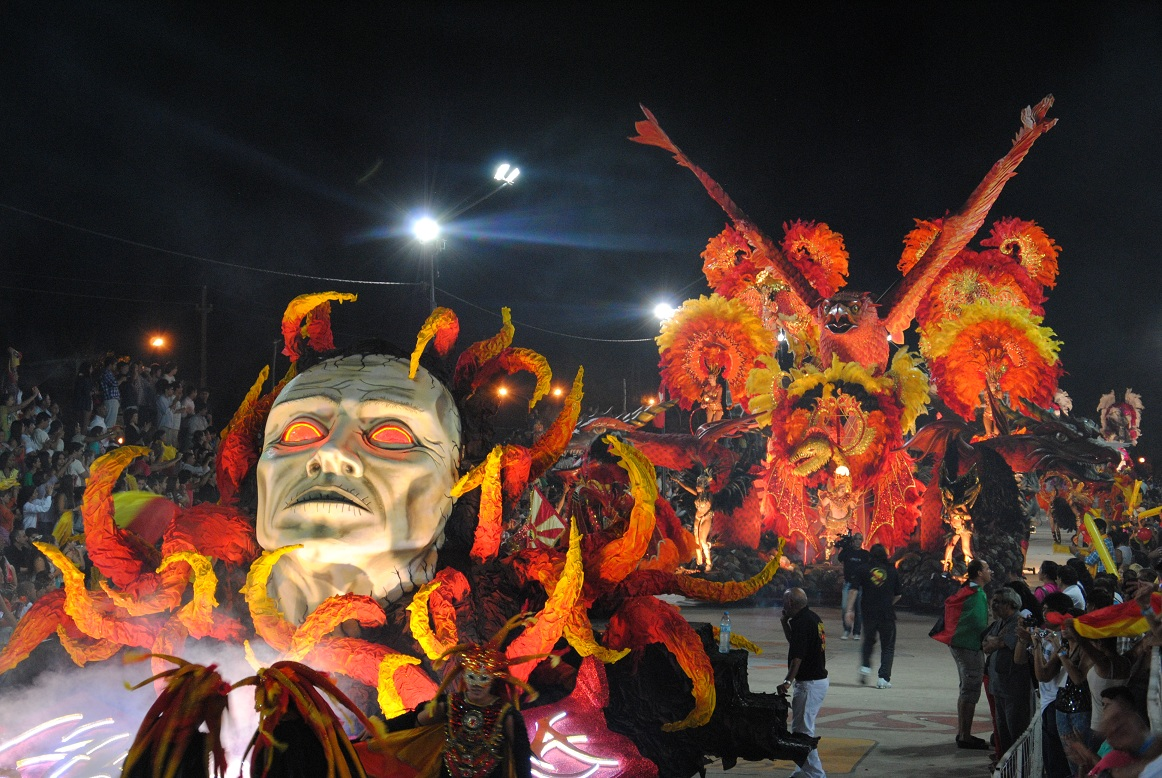
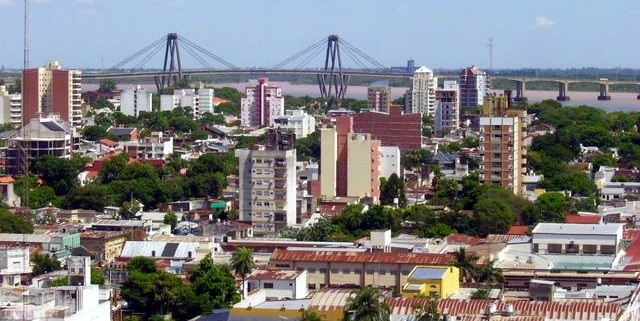
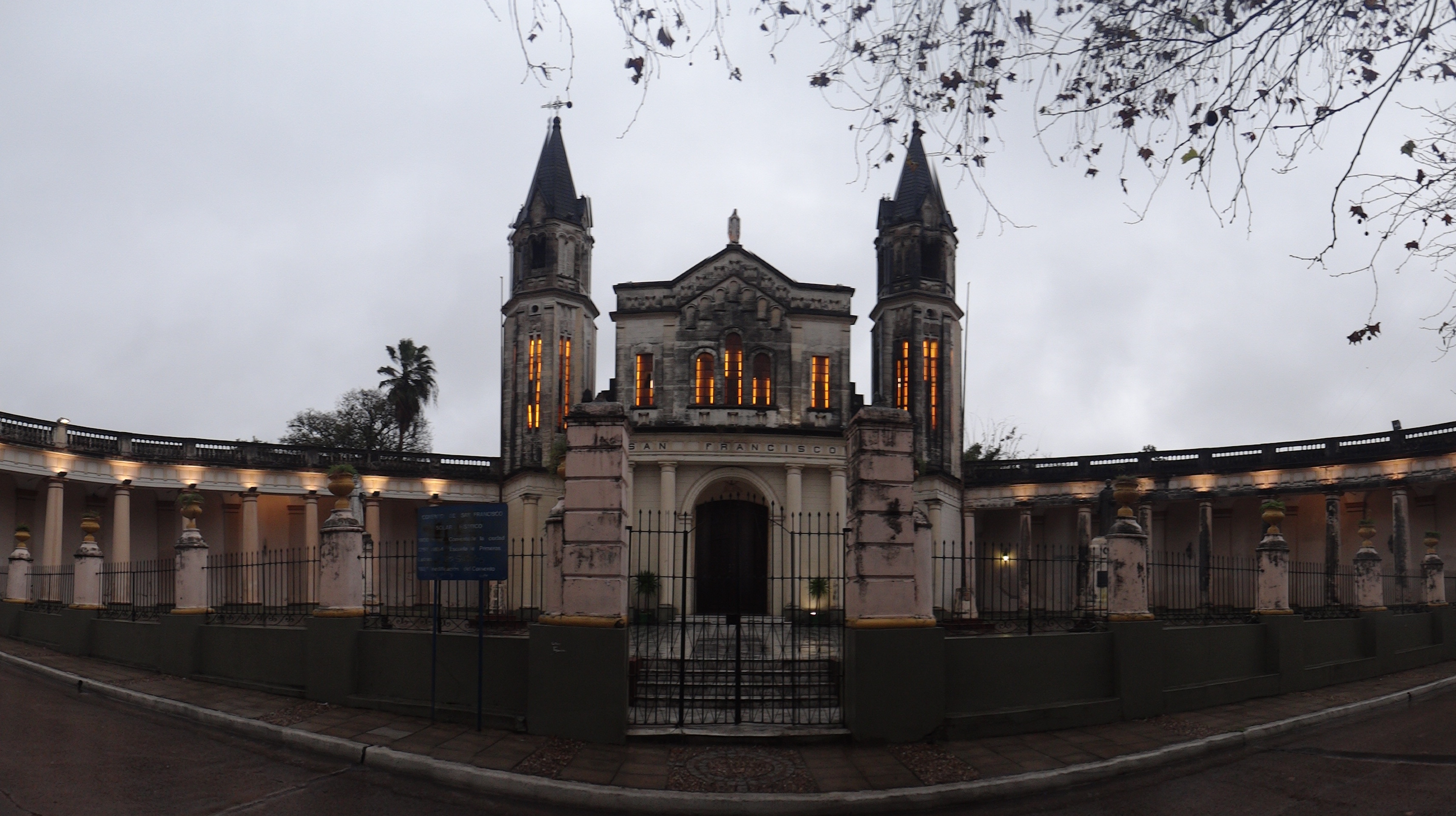
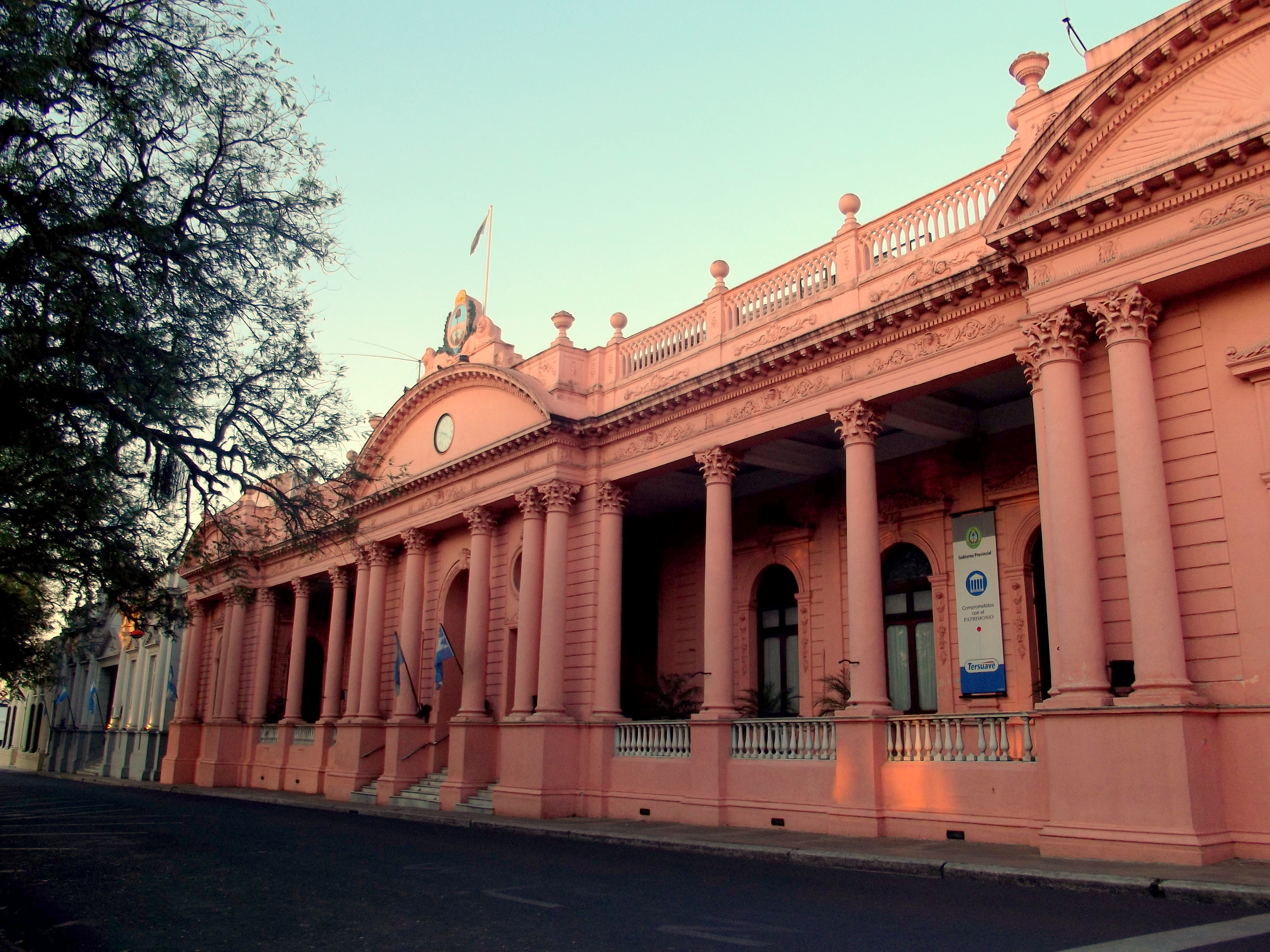
- Above: Panorama view of Manuel Belgano Bridge, Corrientes Carnival on every February Middle:The city of Corrientes with the General Belgano Bridge in the background Bottom: Corrientes Carthedral, Corrientes City Hall (All items were left to right)

- Flag Coat of arms

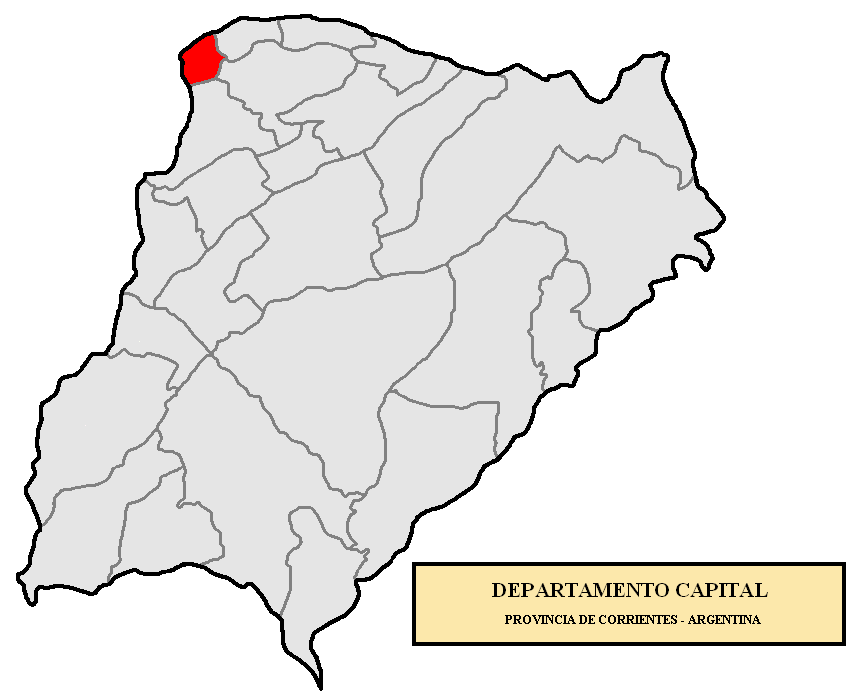

- Location of Corrientes in Argentina
- Coordinates: 27°29′S 58°49′W
- Country: Argentina
- Province: Corrientes
- Department: Capital

Government
  - Intendant: Roberto Fabían Ríos (Front for Victory)

Area
  - City: 500 km^{2} (190 sq mi)
- Elevation: 52 m (171 ft)

Population (2010 census)
  - Urban: 346,334
- Demonym(s): Correntine correntino/a (Spanish) taraguigua (Guarani)
- Time zone: UTC−3 (ART)
- CPA base: W3400
- Dialing code: +54 379
- Website: Official website

Corrientes (Spanish pronunciation: [koˈrjentes]; Guarani: Taragui, lit. 'Currents') is the capital city of the province of Corrientes, Argentina, on the eastern shore of the Paraná River, about 1,000 km (621 mi) from Buenos Aires and 300 km (186 mi) from Posadas, on National Route 12. It has a population of 346,334 according to the 2010 Census. It lies opposite its twin city, Resistencia, Chaco.

Corrientes has a mix of colonial and modern architecture, several churches and a number of lapacho, ceibo, jacaranda and orange trees. It is also home to one of Argentina's biggest carnival and chamamé celebrations.

The annual average temperature is 21.3 °C (70.3 °F). The annual rainfall is around 1,500 millimetres (59 in).

== Transportation ==
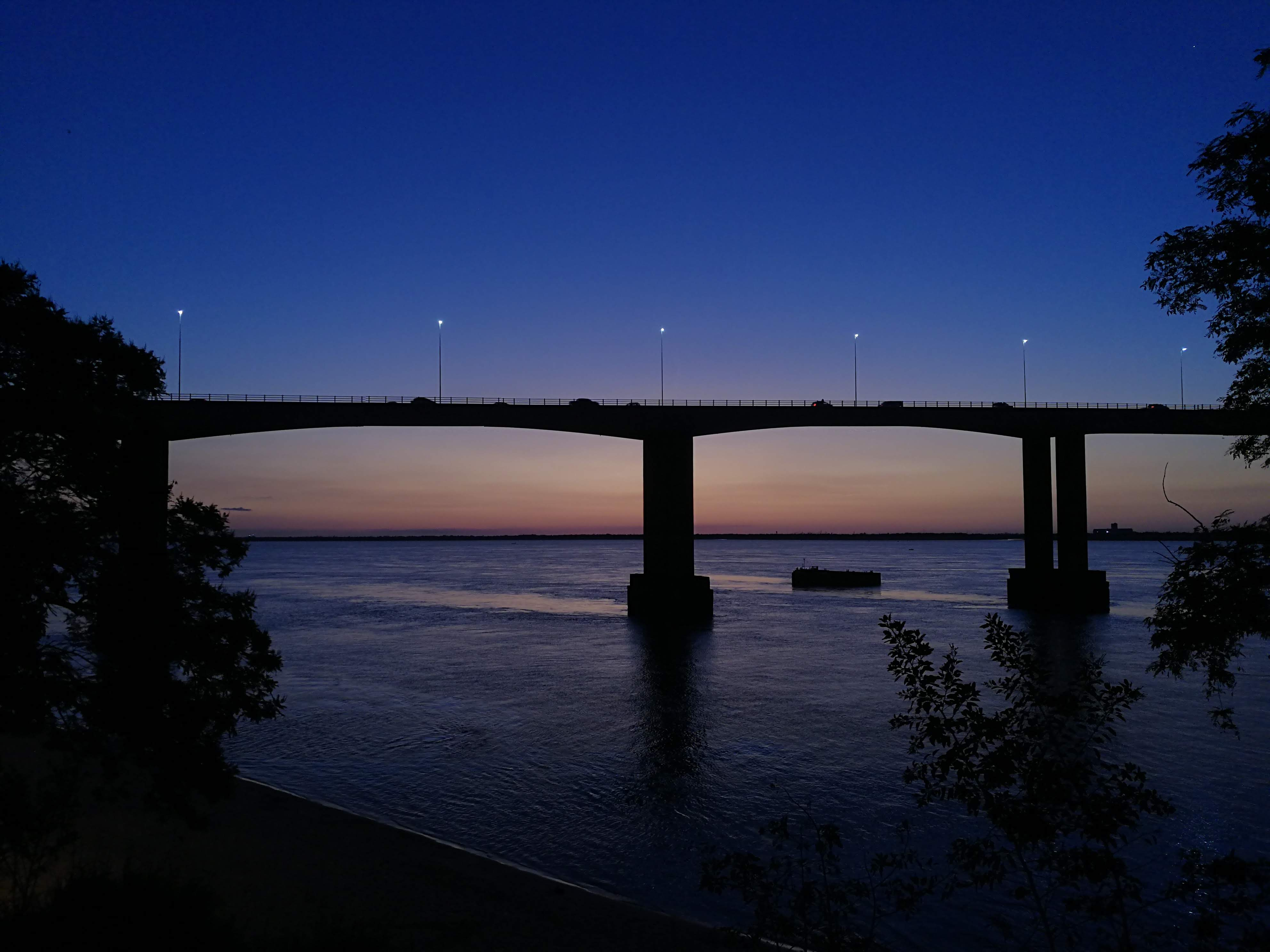
Belgrano Bridge during sunset, Corrientes, Argentina.

Located in the Argentine Littoral, near the Argentina–Paraguay border, the General Belgrano Bridge crosses the Paraná River which serves as the natural border with the neighbouring Chaco Province. On the other side of the bridge is Resistencia, capital of Chaco. To the west and up the Paraná, between Paraguay and Argentina, lies the Yaciretá dam, one of the largest hydroelectric power generators in the world.

The Doctor Fernando Piragine Niveyro International Airport (IATA: CNQ, ICAO: SARC) at coordinates 27°26′20″S 58°46′03″W, 5 km (3 mi) away from the city, serves the city.

The Ferrocarril Económico Correntino narrow gauge railway line to Mburucuyá operated from 1912 until 1927.

== History ==
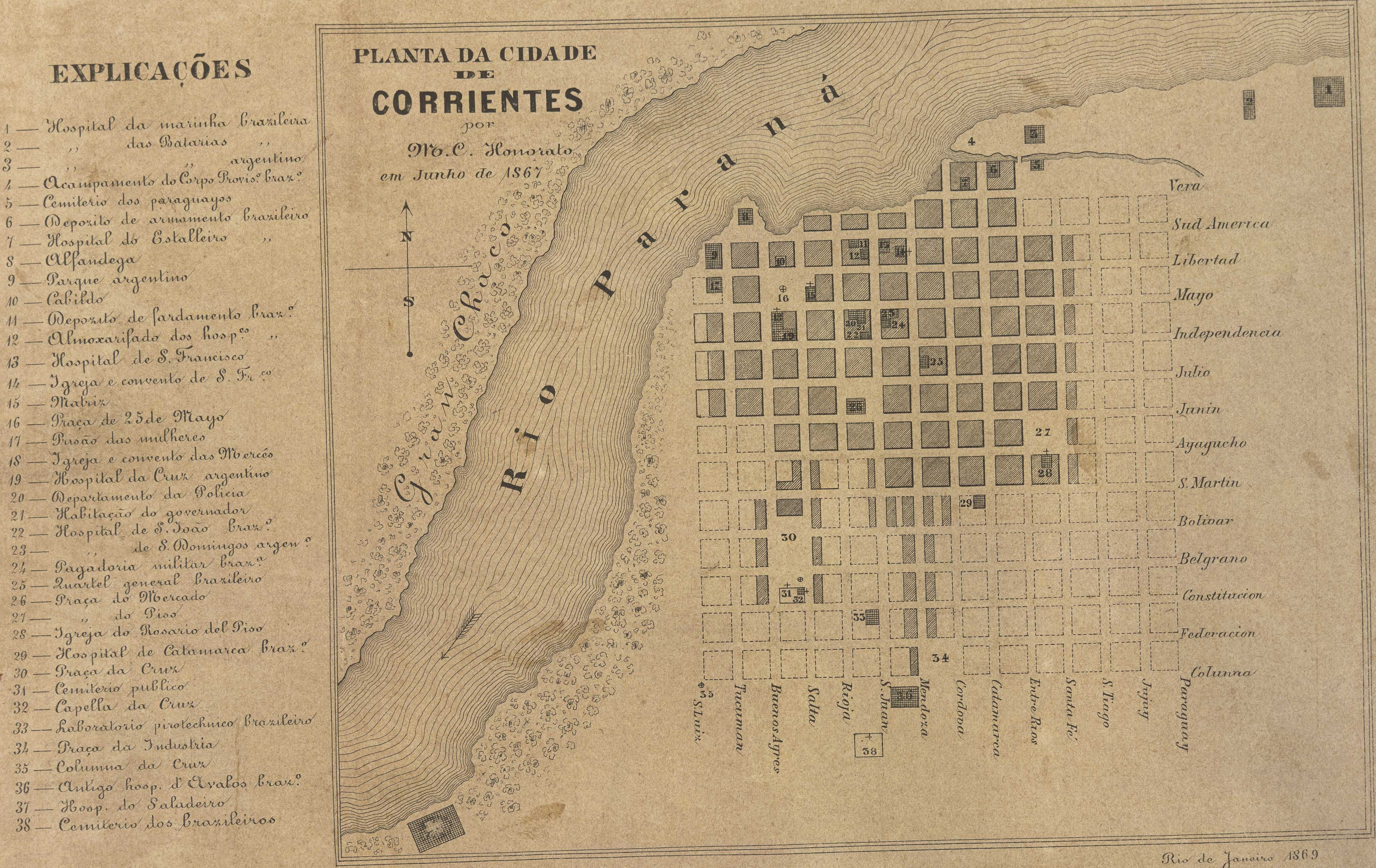
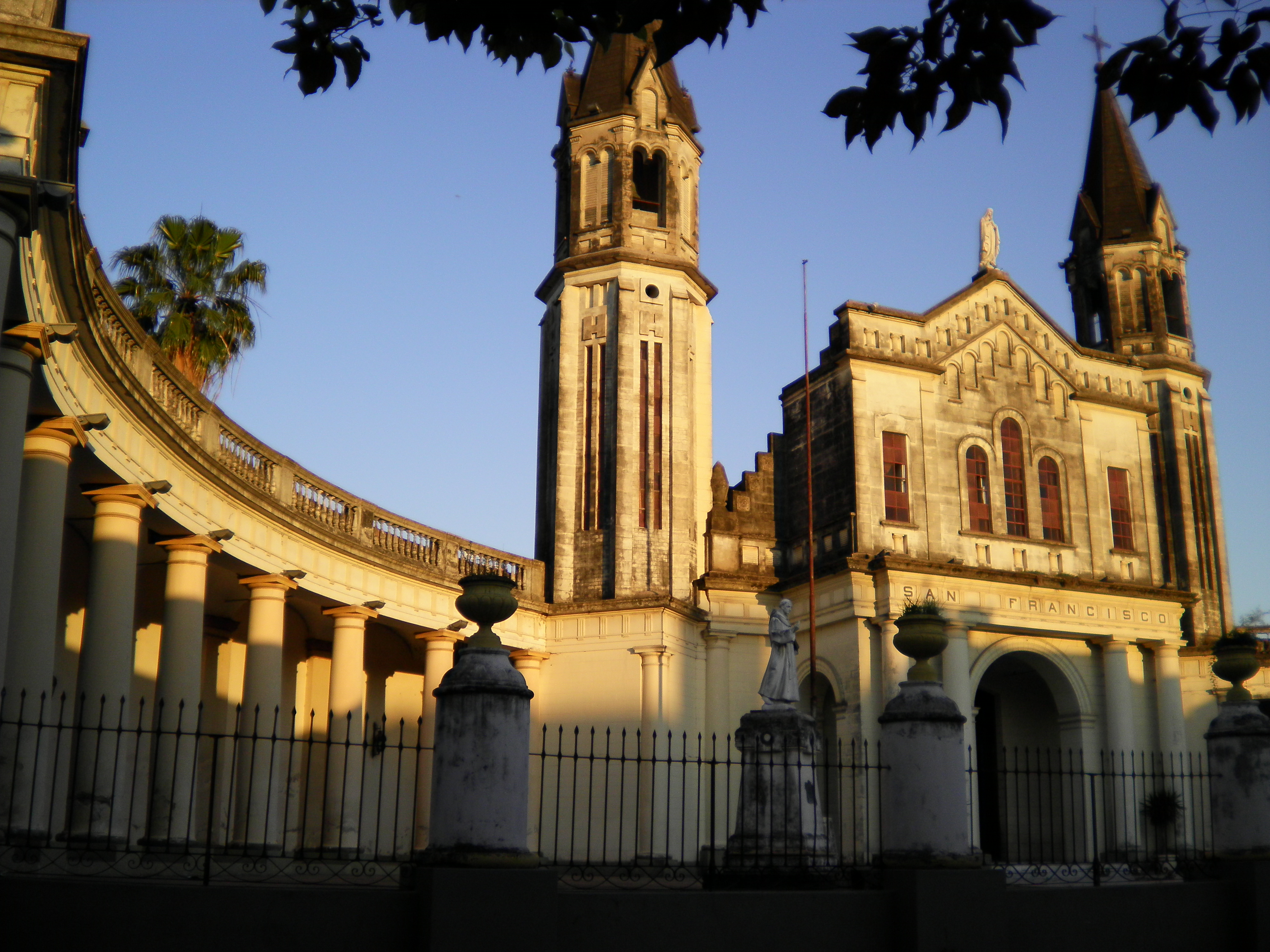
Plan of the city of Corrientes in June 1867 (left) and the church and convent of Saint Francis (right), in Corrientes, built in 1607.

Sebastian Cabot established in 1527 the Sancti Spiritu fort upstream of the Paraná River, and in 1536 Pedro de Mendoza reached further north into the basin of the river, searching for the Sierras of Silver.

Juan Torres de Vera y Aragón founded the city on April 3, 1588, and named it as San Juan de Vera de las Siete Corrientes ("Saint John of Vera of the Seven Currents"), which was later shortened to Corrientes. The "seven currents" refer to the seven peninsulas on the shore of the river at this place, that produced wild currents that made difficult the navigation of the river through this part.

Nevertheless, its position between Asunción - in present Paraguay - and Buenos Aires made it an important middle point, especially because of its 55-metre-high lands that prevent flooding when the water level rises.

In 1615 Jesuits settled near the Uruguay River. In 1807 the city resisted the British invasions. During the Argentine War of Independence it was in permanent conflict with the centralist government of Buenos Aires, but the Paraguayan War united them after the city was attacked by Paraguayan forces in 1865.

== Climate ==
The annual average temperature is 21.3 °C or 70.3 °F. The annual rainfall is around 1,500 millimetres (59 in). The Köppen climate classification subtype for this climate is Cfa (humid subtropical climate). Frosts are rare; with the dates of the first and last frost being July 5 and July 12 respectively, indicating that most of the year is frost-free. The highest temperature recorded was 43.3 °C (109.9 °F) on September 30, 2020, and the next day, the all-time record was broken again with 43.5 °C (110.3 °F). The lowest temperature ever recorded was −2.8 °C (27.0 °F) on June 15, 1979.

Climate data for Corrientes Airport (1991–2020, extremes 1962-present)
Month	Jan	Feb	Mar	Apr	May	Jun	Jul	Aug	Sep	Oct	Nov	Dec	Year
Record high °C (°F)	42.6 (108.7)	42.8 (109.0)	41.4 (106.5)	37.2 (99.0)	34.6 (94.3)	34.1 (93.4)	33.0 (91.4)	37.9 (100.2)	43.3 (109.9)	43.5 (110.3)	42.4 (108.3)	41.1 (106.0)	43.5 (110.3)
Mean daily maximum °C (°F)	33.0 (91.4)	32.0 (89.6)	30.5 (86.9)	27.3 (81.1)	23.4 (74.1)	21.4 (70.5)	21.2 (70.2)	23.8 (74.8)	25.8 (78.4)	28.1 (82.6)	29.7 (85.5)	31.9 (89.4)	27.3 (81.1)
Daily mean °C (°F)	26.9 (80.4)	26.1 (79.0)	24.5 (76.1)	21.6 (70.9)	18.0 (64.4)	16.1 (61.0)	15.2 (59.4)	17.1 (62.8)	19.1 (66.4)	22.1 (71.8)	23.8 (74.8)	26.0 (78.8)	21.4 (70.5)
Mean daily minimum °C (°F)	21.6 (70.9)	21.1 (70.0)	19.7 (67.5)	17.2 (63.0)	13.7 (56.7)	12.0 (53.6)	10.4 (50.7)	11.6 (52.9)	13.6 (56.5)	16.8 (62.2)	18.0 (64.4)	20.5 (68.9)	16.4 (61.5)
Record low °C (°F)	11.8 (53.2)	11.0 (51.8)	7.2 (45.0)	3.9 (39.0)	−0.4 (31.3)	−2.8 (27.0)	−2.0 (28.4)	−1.7 (28.9)	0.5 (32.9)	2.8 (37.0)	7.2 (45.0)	8.3 (46.9)	−2.8 (27.0)
Average precipitation mm (inches)	179.5 (7.07)	152.2 (5.99)	155.2 (6.11)	170.8 (6.72)	87.8 (3.46)	65.3 (2.57)	32.2 (1.27)	40.3 (1.59)	60.3 (2.37)	153.8 (6.06)	184.8 (7.28)	172.9 (6.81)	1,455.1 (57.29)
Average precipitation days (≥ 0.1 mm)	9.0	8.9	8.2	9.0	8.1	7.6	5.5	5.4	7.2	10.4	9.6	9.4	98.4
Average relative humidity (%)	71.6	74.1	76.6	78.8	80.3	80.4	75.2	70.0	68.5	72.1	70.7	71.2	74.1
Mean monthly sunshine hours	288.3	240.1	232.5	201.0	195.3	162.0	195.3	204.6	189.0	217.0	267.0	279.0	2,671.1
Mean daily sunshine hours	9.3	8.5	7.5	6.7	6.3	5.4	6.3	6.6	6.3	7.0	8.9	9.0	7.3
Percentage possible sunshine	66	67	61	59	60	54	57	55	54	62	65	67	61
Source 1: Servicio Meteorológico Nacional
Source 2: NOAA (percent sun 1961–1990)

== Education ==
- National University of the Northeast
- University of Cuenca del Plata

== Sister cities ==
Corrientes is twinned with:

- Encarnación, Paraguay
- Estepa, Spain

== In fiction ==
The Graham Greene spy novel The Honorary Consul (1973) takes place in Corrientes.

== Sports ==
The city's main football teams are the: Huracán Corrientes, Boca Unidos, and Deportivo Mandiyú.

== Notable people ==
- Augusto Aguirre, (born 1999), footballer
- José Ruiz Aragón, (born 1987), politician
- Aldo Araujo, (born 1992), footballer
- Rafael Barrios, (born 1993), footballer
- Jonathan Benítez, (born 1991), footballer
- Alejandro Bentos, (born 1978), footballer
- José Bilibio, (born 1975), Armenian footballer
- Sebastián Crismanich, (born 1986), Olympic taekwondo athlete
- Héctor Echagüe, (born 1988), footballer
- Héctor Echavarría, (born 1969), martial artist and actor
- Carlos Espínola, (born 1971), windsurfer and politician
- Silvio Fogel, (1949–2016), footballer
- Guillermo Franco, (born 1976), Argentine-Mexican footballer
- Ramona Galarza, (1940–2020), singer
- Juan Garat, (born 1973), tennis player
- Luciano Gómez, (born 1996), footballer
- Antonio Gonzaga, (born 1875), cook and author
- Ricardo González, (born 1969), golfer
- Marcelo Herrera, (born 1998), footballer
- Martina Iñíguez, (born 1939), writer
- Angelo Ibarra, (born 1999), footballer
- Leonardo Jara, (born 1991), footballer
- Manuel Lagraña, (1821–1882), politician
- May Simón Lifschitz, Danish-Argentinian actress
- Joaquín Madariaga, (1799–1848), politician
- Leonardo Mayer, (born 1987), tennis player
- Alberto Márcico, (born 1960), footballer and manager
- Júnior Mendieta, (born 1993), footballer
- Héctor Morales, (born 1989), footballer
- Yiya Murano, (1930–2014), serial killer
- Carlos Muzzio, (born 1984), rugby union player
- Hilario Navarro, (born 1980), footballer
- Marcelo Ortiz, (born 1994), footballer
- Teresa Parodi, (born 1947), singer and songwriter
- Fabián Ponce, (born 1971), footballer and manager
- Ramón Héctor Ponce, (1948–2019), footballer
- Gabriel Ramírez, (born 1995), footballer
- Pedro Braillard Poccard, (born 1954), politician and lawyer
- Gonzalo Rovira, (born 1988), footballer
- Nancy Sand, (born 1964), politician
- Raúl Scalabrini Ortiz, (1898–1959), writer, journalist, essayist, poet
- Juan Pablo Segovia, (born 1989), footballer
- Edgardo Simón, (born 1974), cyclist
- Gustavo Valdés, (born 1968), politician
- Julián Velázquez, (born 1990), footballer
- Agustín Velotti, (born 1992), tennis player
- Isabel Viudes, (born 1944), politician

== Gallery ==
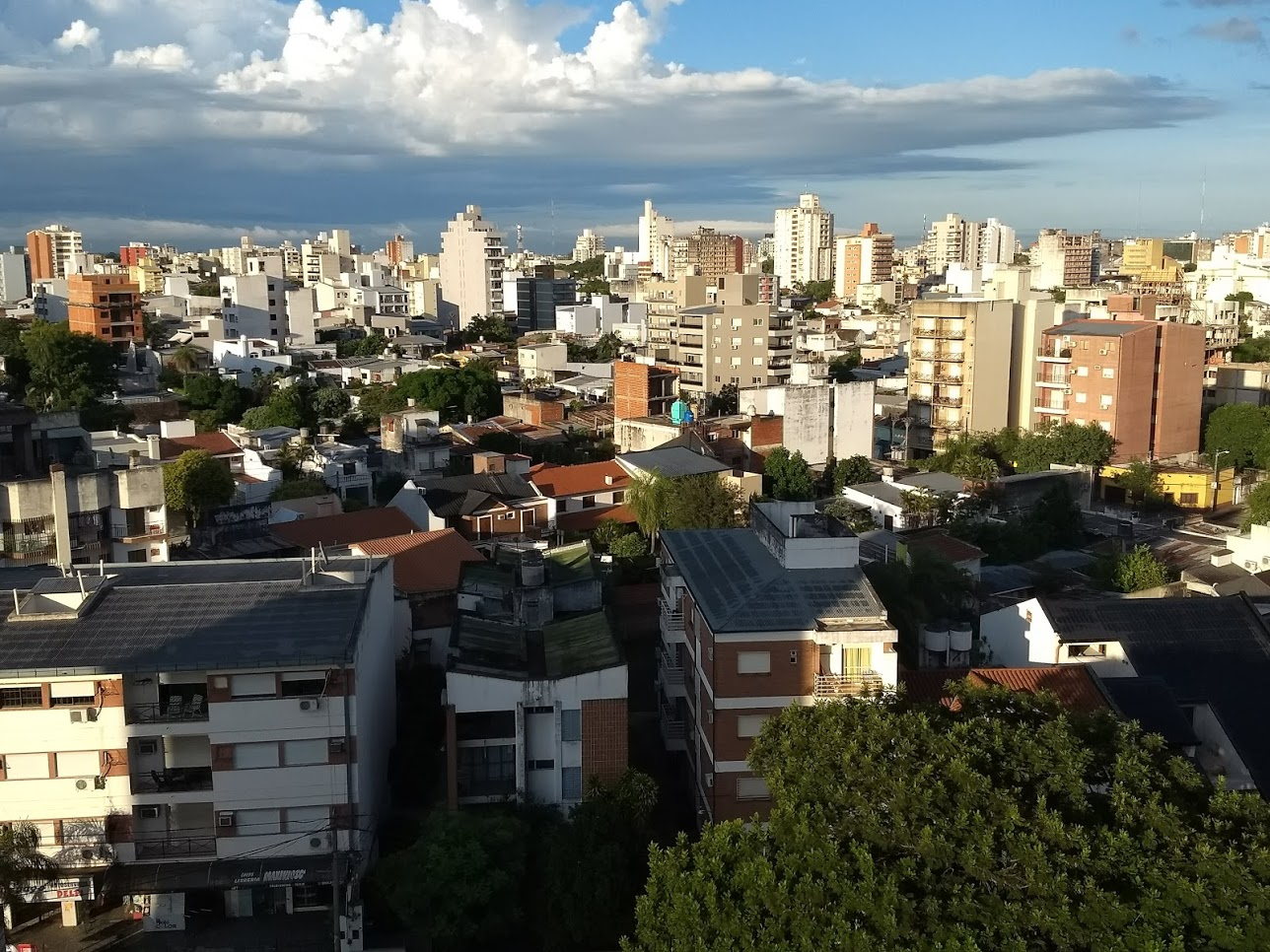
Corrientes, Argentina

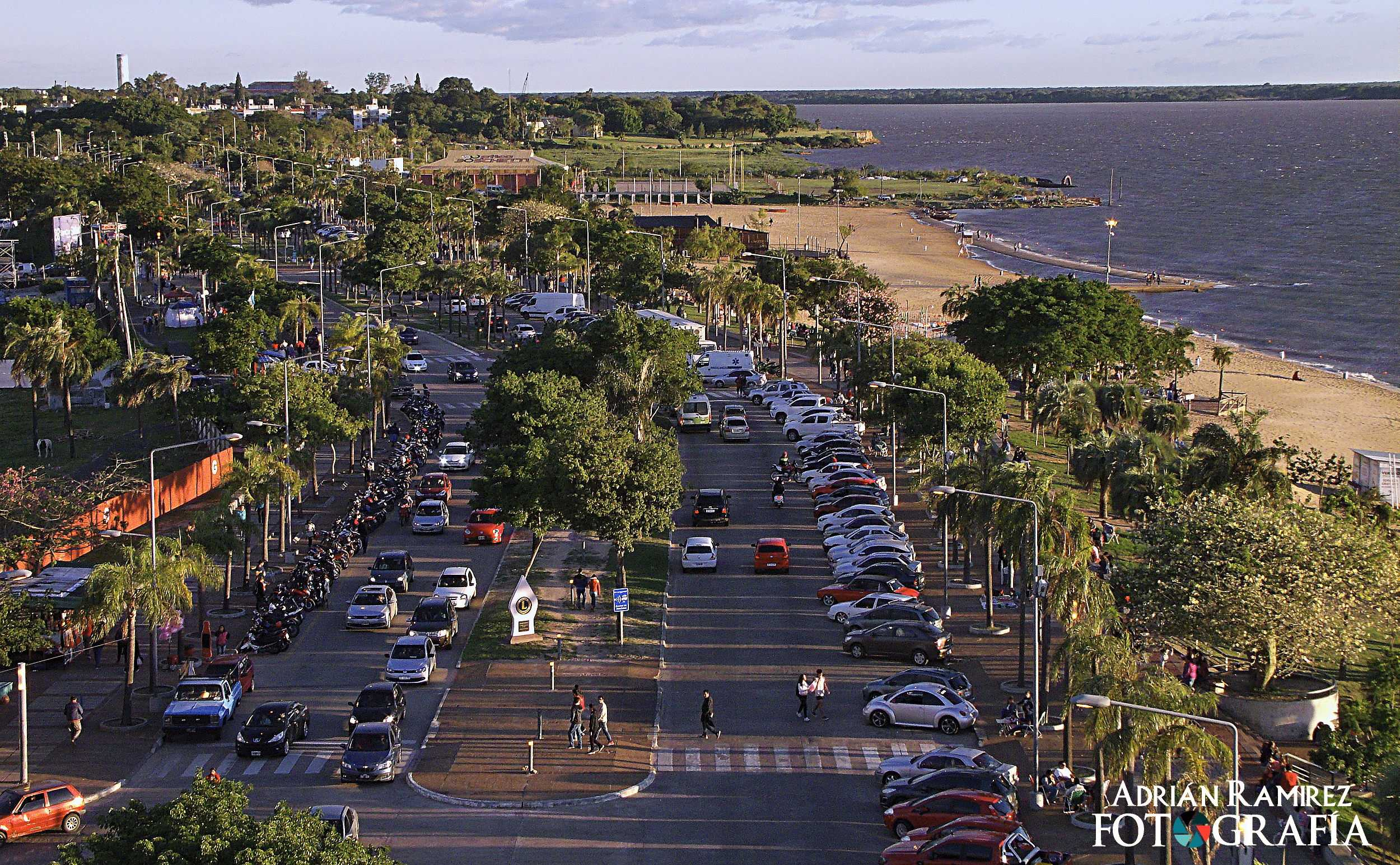
View of the Corrientes waterfront (Playa Arazaty)

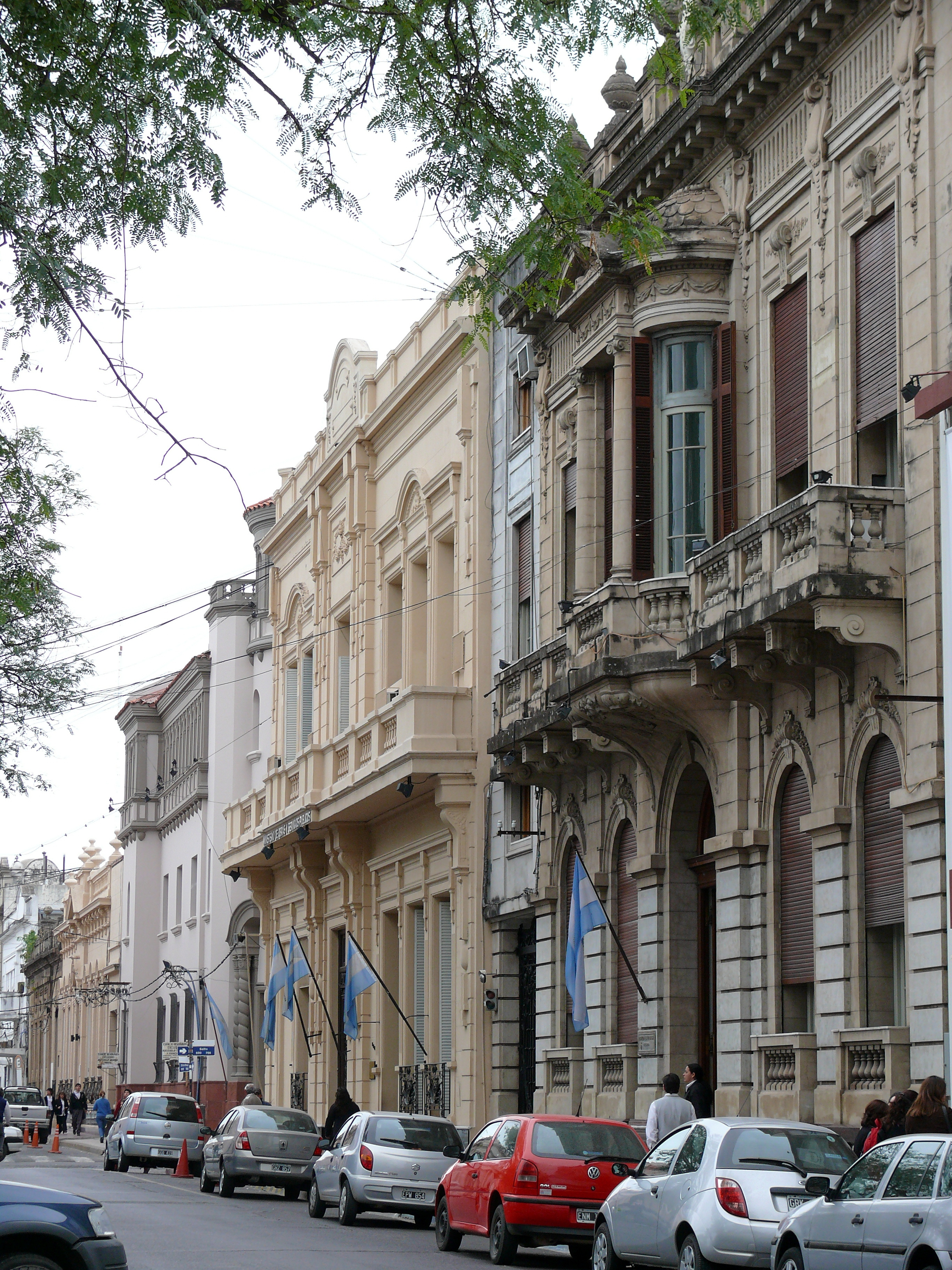
Downtown Corrientes, Argentina

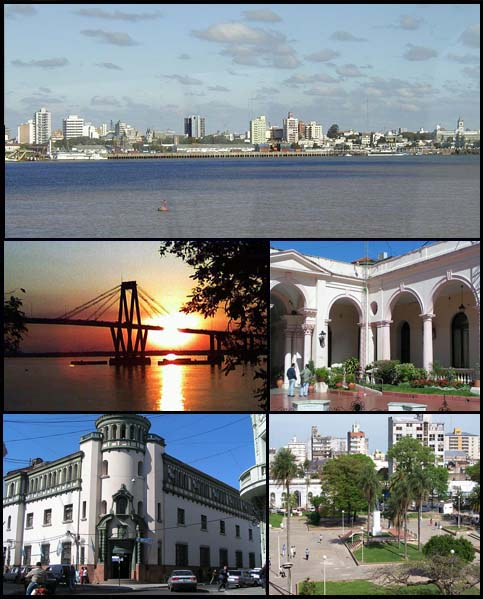
Corrientes, Argentina

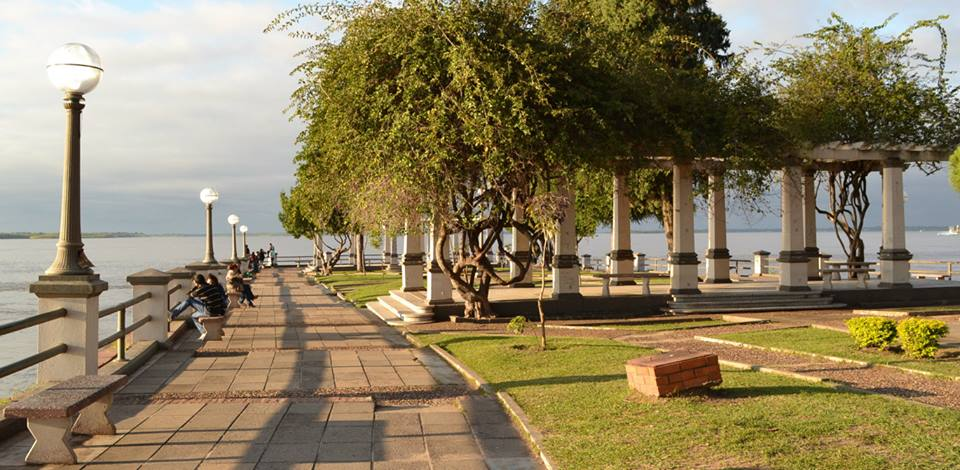
Saint Sebastian Point, Corrientes, Argentina

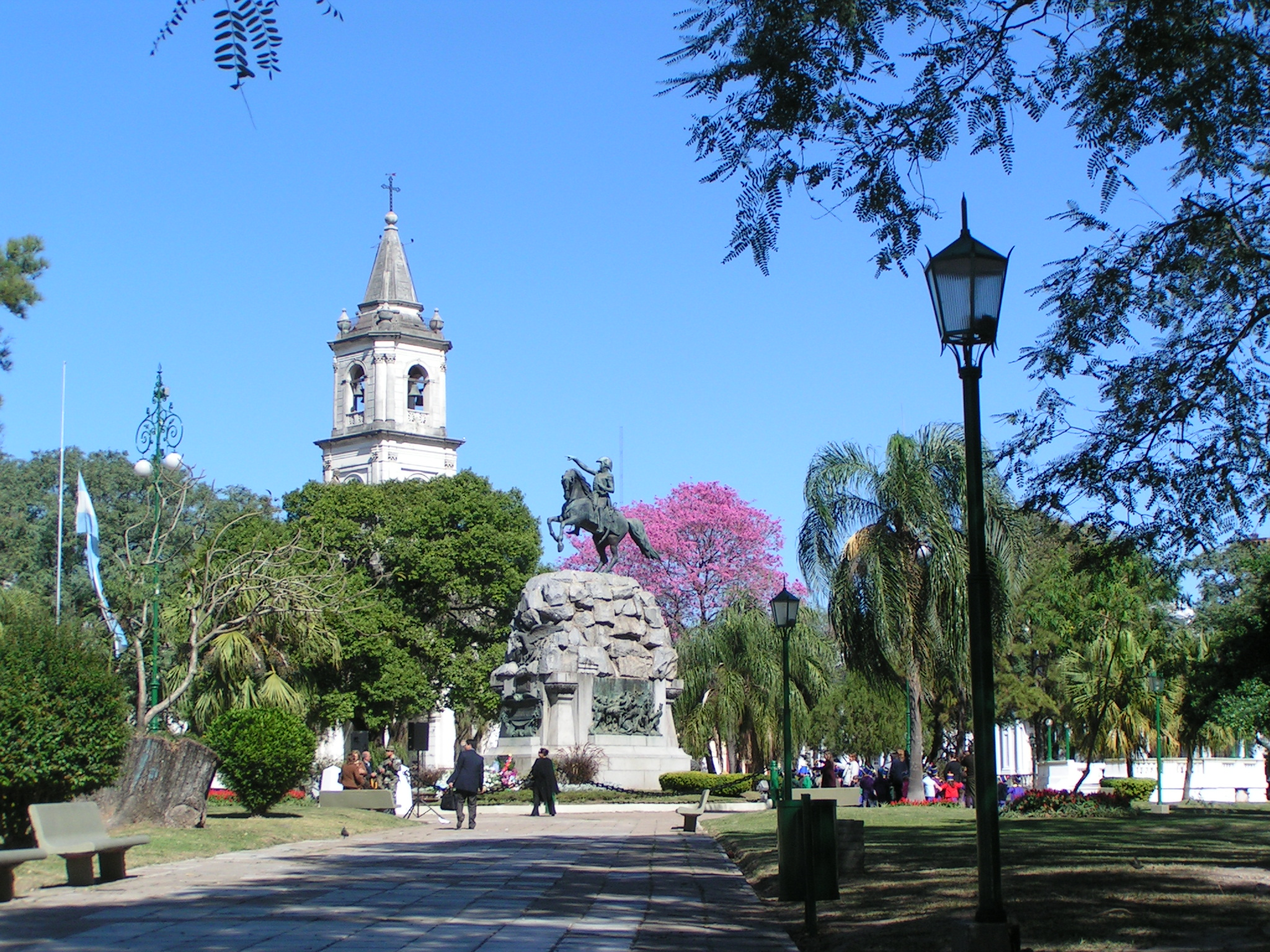
May 25 square, Corrientes

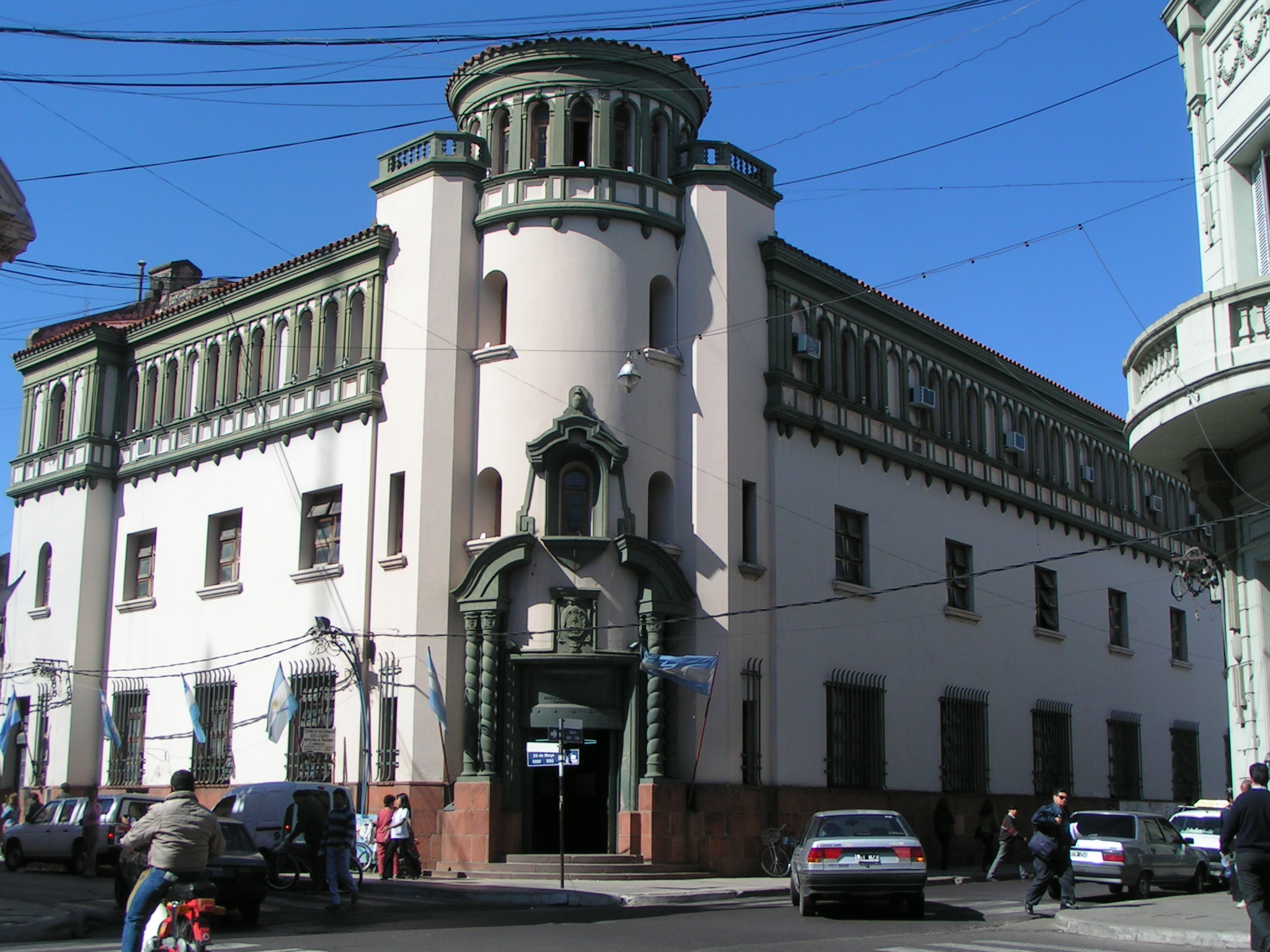
The Provincial Ministry of the Economy

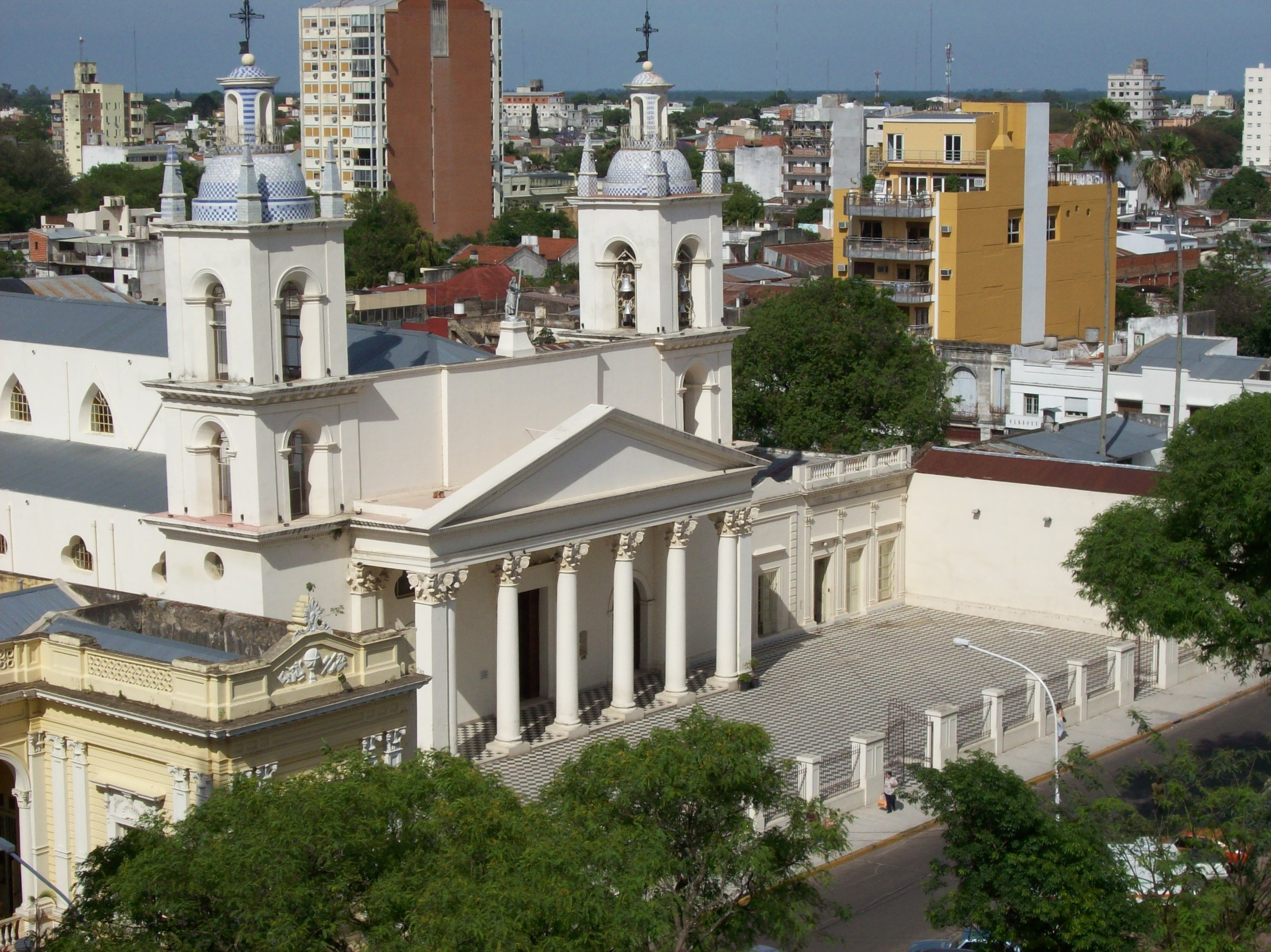
Corrientes Cathedral, Argentina

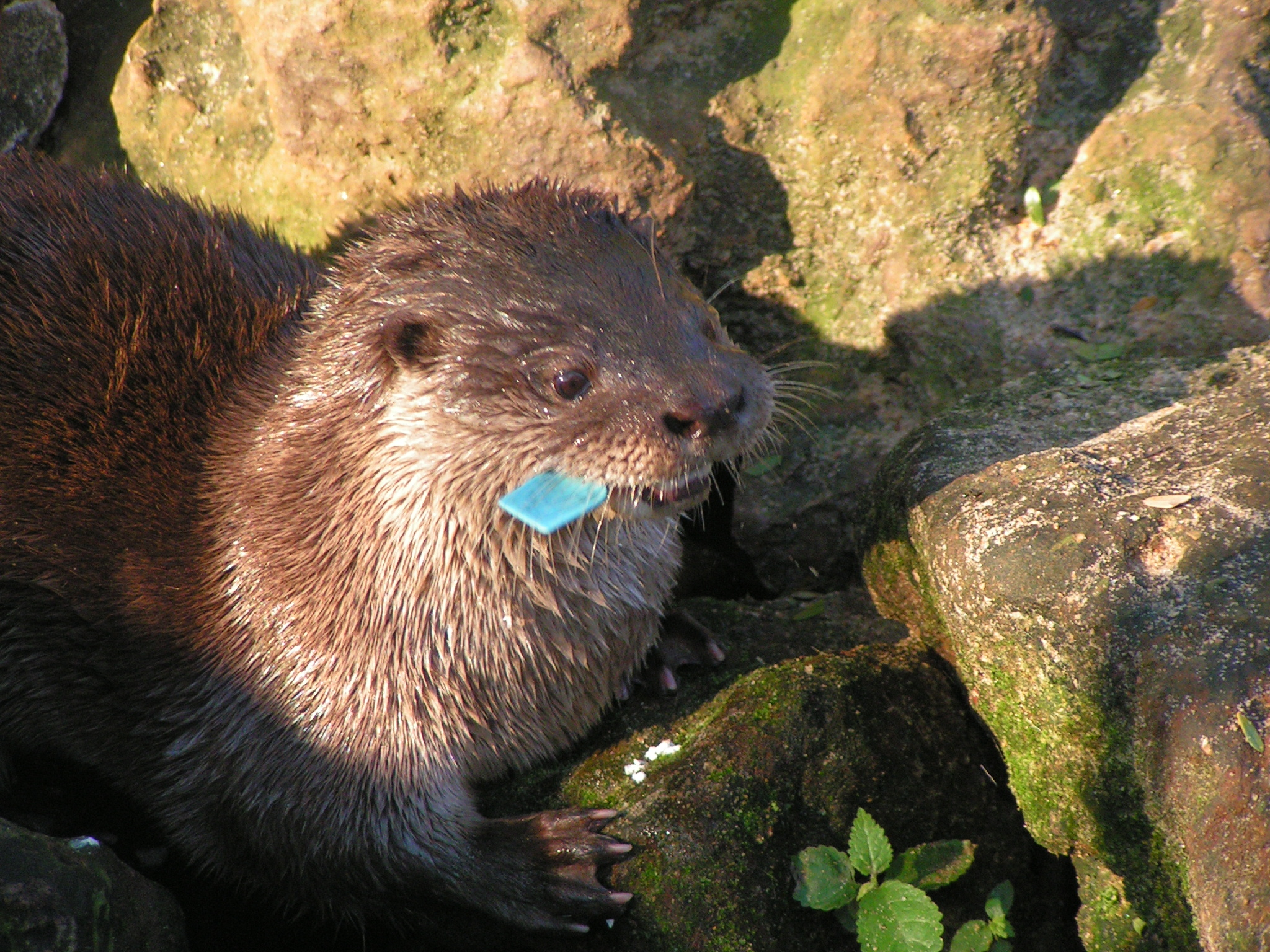
River otter and toy, Corrientes Zoo

== See also ==
- Barrio Esperanza
