= Frente de Todos (1996 coalition) =

Argentinian political party

The Frente de Todos (English: Everybody's Front) is a provincial political party alliance based in Chaco and Corrientes Provinces, Argentina.

The front is made up of members of the Radical Civic Union and most supporters of the Justicialist Party. It had the support of Peronist President Néstor Kirchner but is opposed by local conservative parties, the Eduardo Duhalde faction of the Justicialists and elements of the national leadership of the Radicals.

In 2003 Roy Nikisch was elected governor of Chaco at the head of the Front. At the legislative elections of 23 October 2005 the party won six of the 127 elected deputies (out of a 257 total), including Ricardo Colombi, the former governor of Corrientes Province. His cousin, Arturo Colombi, who heads the front in the province, won the election for governor of Corrientes.
